= Black Catholic Movement =

African-American religious movement

- Date: 1968–1995 (Note: Various other dates have been proposed as the date on which the movement began or ended.)
- Location: United States
- Caused by: Assassination of Martin Luther King Jr., Racism, segregation, Jim Crow laws, socioeconomic inequality, Second Vatican Council
- Result: Introduction of African American music and spirituality to Catholic liturgy and praxis; Redevelopment of many inner-city Catholic schools as independent schools run by Black nuns and religious sisters; Founding of new Black Catholic organizations; National Black Catholic Congress; National Black Sisters' Conference; National Black Catholic Clergy Caucus; National Black Catholic Seminarians Association; National Association of Black Catholic Deacons; National Association of Black Catholic Administrators; Appointment of first African-American bishops; First African-American archbishops; Increase in number of Black seminarians, brothers, priests, nuns, and religious sisters; Exploration of possibility for an African-American Catholic rite

The Black Catholic Movement (or Black Catholic Revolution) was a movement of African-American Catholics in the United States that developed and shaped modern Black Catholicism.

From roughly 1968 to the mid-1990s, Black Catholicism would transform from pre–Vatican II roots into a full member of the Black Church. It developed its own structure, identity, music, liturgy, thought, theology, and appearance within the larger Catholic Church. As a result, in the 21st century, Black Catholic Church traditions are seen in most Black parishes, institutions, schools, and organizations across the country.

== Background ==
=== Vatican II ===
In 1962, Pope John XXIII convened the most recent Catholic ecumenical council, Vatican II. It eliminated Latin as the required liturgical language of the Western portion of the Church.

This change opened the door for inculturation in both new and historic areas of practice. As early as the 1950s, under the creative eye of Black Catholics such as Fr Clarence Rivers, the fusion of Protestant-originated Black Gospel music with Catholic liturgy had been experimented with on a basic level. Rivers's music (and musical direction) was used at the first official English-language Mass in the United States in 1964, including his watershed work, "God Is Love".

=== Membership boom ===
Alongside this nascent inculturation came a second boom in Black Catholic numbers, as they increased by 220,000 (35%) during the 1960s, and more than half were converts. In 1966, Fr Harold R. Perry became the first known Black bishop to serve in the US when he was named auxiliary bishop of New Orleans.

Following the assassination of Martin Luther King and associated riots (including Mayor Daley's shoot-to-kill order in Chicago), Black Catholics inaugurated a number of powerful new organizations in early 1968. These included the National Black Catholic Clergy Caucus (NBCC), organized by Fr Herman Porter, and its sister organization, the National Black Sisters' Conference (NBSC), organized by Sr Martin de Porres Grey.

The larger movement (or "revolution") broke out thereafter as Black Catholics increasingly latched onto Black Power and Black Consciousness as appropriate means of expressing their right to be "authentically Black" in their expression of the Catholic faith.

== History ==
=== NBCC statement (1968) ===
At the inaugural NBCCC meeting in Detroit, caucus members declared in the opening line of their statement that "the Catholic Church in the United States is primarily a White, racist institution."

The statement made waves throughout the Church. It provided perspective on the riots that were so intensely discomforting White American (and White Catholic) sensibilities, and was part of the demands for change in the Catholic Church—including an active commitment to Black self-oversight, freedom, and vocations. More specifically, they demanded a Black vicariate, an episcopal vicar, a Black-led office for Black Catholics, Black diaconate, Black liturgical inculturation, inclusion of Black history and culture in seminary education, and diocesan programs for training those who intended to shepherd Black Catholics. Without such changes, the caucus claimed, the Catholic Church would soon become irrelevant to the Black community.

At least two of these requests were answered rather quickly. With the support of a White Josephite superior general, who advocated for it as early as 1967, the permanent diaconate was restored in the United States in October 1968, and the National Office for Black Catholics (NOBC) was established in 1970.

=== Growth (1969–1971) ===
The movement/revolution centered in Chicago, where numerous Black Catholics resided in the late 1960s, forming sizable Black parishes. But these were always under the leadership of White priests. Fr George Clements, one of the more radical(ized) members of the inaugural NBCCC meeting, entered into an extended row with Archbishop John Cody over this lack of Black pastors in Chicago and Black Catholic inculturation.

Unconventional alliances with local Black Protestant leaders and Black radical activists resulted in innovative (and defiant) liturgical celebrations known as the Black Unity Mass, trans-parochial events where Black priests donned Afrocentric vestments, decorated the altar similarly, and celebrated the Mass with a decidedly "Black" liturgical flair. One such Mass in 1969 included New York activist-priest Lawrence Lucas, an 80-voice gospel choir provided by the Rev. Jesse Jackson, and security provided by the Black Panthers.

One of the first parishes to engage in Black liturgical inculturation and establish a gospel choir was St. Francis de Sales Catholic Church in New Orleans, in 1969. (It is now known as St. Katharine Drexel Church). One of the first musicians to experiment similarly was Grayson Warren Brown, a Presbyterian convert who set the entire Mass to gospel-style music. Fr William Norvel, a Josephite, helped introduce gospel choirs to Black Catholic parishes nationwide (especially in Washington, D.C., and Los Angeles). This "Gospel Mass" trend quickly spread across the nation.

Even as these new changes swept through the emerging "Black Catholic Church", so too did the backlash and general unease with which many Black Catholics held their faith. As they embraced a more robust Black nationalism, it often clashed with all they knew Catholicism to represent. This sentiment was not limited to laypeople nor did was it contradicted by White reactions to the movement/revolution, as many dioceses, religious orders, parishes, and lay groups reacted negatively to both the Civil Rights and Black Power movements on the whole.

In 1970, the National Black Catholic Lay Caucus (NBCLC, or NBLCC) was founded. It partnered with the NBCCC, NBSC, NBCSA, and NOBC in combating the marginalization of African Americans. At their first meeting in August of that year, they drafted a resolution echoing the demands of the inaugural NBCCC meeting two years prior. In addition, they added new demands, such as four Black bishops, greater lay and youth decision-making power, and "hierarchical support in developing an African-American liturgy". The same year, the NOBC was allotted only 30% of their requested funding for 1970 by the United States Conference of Catholic Bishops (USCCB); they rejected the low funding.

The NOBC also accused the hierarchy of paternalism in their dealing with African Americans, while also proposing plans to support Black Catholic schools, Black Catholic students in white Catholic schools and blueprints for a Black Catholic seminary at the Interdenominational Theological Center in Atlanta. In the summer of 1971, the NBCLC staged a sit-in at the Josephites' headquarters, demanding similar changes as described by the Lay Caucus in 1970.

=== Education reform, Black offices and exodus (1971–1975) ===
After the NOBC rejected the low-ball USCCB funding and after Cardinal Patrick O'Boyle (a staunch supporter of Civil Rights) announced his retirement, a delegation of Black Catholics led by the NBCLC president brought their grievances to the Vatican in 1971. They informed Deputy Secretary of State, Archbishop Giovanni Benelli, that the American bishops had been "lying" to Rome about the state of Black Catholicism (which was bleeding members and "dying"). They demanded that a Black man be appointed as the next Archbishop of Washington, D.C., an African-American rite be created, and an African-American cardinal be named.

That same year, the NBSC, NOBC, and various Black Catholic laypeople spearheaded a national campaign to stop the mass closings of Catholic schools in urban and predominantly Black communities. In many cases, neglected and/or to-be-shuttered Black Catholic schools were adapted as community-led institutions. Much like the period some 125 years prior, Black nuns led a movement to educate Black children in a time when the American and Catholic White hierarchy did not seem to care to.

During this same period, Black Catholic ministries began to pop up in dioceses around the country, often in response to hostile conditions and with pushback from many Black Catholics themselves.

The unrest extended into seminaries as well. At the Josephites', tensions between the more race-conscious Black students/members and their White peers, as well as with teachers/elders (Black and White) boiled over into open hostility. Many students left the seminary and a number of Josephite priests resigned. By 1971, the seminary had closed for studies. To this day, Josephite seminarians study at nearby universities, and their vocations from Black Americans has never recovered.

A wave of resignations by priests occurred across Black Catholicism in the 1970s and coincided with a general nadir of American Catholicism overall (the latter being more or less unrelated to race issues). Catholics of all races began lapsing in droves. Between 1970 and 1975, hundreds of Black Catholic seminarians, dozens (~13%) of Black Catholic priests, and 125 Black nuns (~14%) left their posts, including NBCS foundress Sr. Martin de Porres Grey in 1974. Up to 20% of Black Catholics stopped practicing.

=== New organizations, major thinkers and USCCB letter (late 1970s) ===
Even with the decline in vocations and lay practice during the 1970s, various new national Black Catholic organizations emerged by the end of the decade.

During the early to mid-1970s, the various (and largely informal) Black Catholic diocesan offices/ministries began to gain official recognition and approval. In 1976 their leaders formed a consortium known as the National Association of Black Catholic Administrators. The next year, the NOBC became a member, and eventually the NABCA subsumed the NOBC altogether.

The Black Catholic Theological Symposium (BCTS), a yearly gathering dedicated to the promotion of Black Catholic theology, emerged in 1978 in Baltimore. From it has come some of the leading voices not only in Black Catholic theology, but in Womanist and Black theology as well: a founder of one of the watershed organizations of the latter movement (the National Council of Black Churchmen, or NCBC) was the aforementioned Fr Lucas. Writers such as Dr Diana L. Hayes, Dr M. Shawn Copeland, Sr Jamie T. Phelps, Fr Cyprian Davis, and Servant of God Thea Bowman have had an immeasurable influence in advancing the cause of Black Catholic history, theology, theory, and liturgy.

The next year in 1979, the Institute for Black Catholic Studies was founded at Xavier University of Louisiana. Every summer since, it has hosted a variety of accredited courses on Black Catholic theology, ministry, ethics, and history, offering a Continuing Education and Enrichment program, as well as a Master of Theology degree. It is "the only graduate theology program in the western hemisphere taught from a Black Catholic perspective".

That same year, the USCCB issued a pastoral letter dissecting and condemning racism, entitled "Brothers and Sisters to Us", for the first time addressing the issue in a group publication.

=== George Stallings and Black bishops (1980s–1987) ===
Fr George Stallings, a Black Catholic priest known for his fiery activism and no-holds-barred demands of the Church, pressed for a Black Catholic rite (complete with bishops and the associated episcopal structure) during the 70s and 80s; this bold request was intended to give Black Catholics the kind of independence many were calling for at the time.

In 1974 Eugene A. Marino was named auxiliary bishop of Washington, and Joseph L. Howze became the first recognized Black Catholic bishop of a diocese when he was named Bishop of Biloxi in 1977. Marino would become the first-ever Black Catholic archbishop in 1988, following an open demand made to the USCCB in 1985. Marino resigned from his archbishopric two years after his appointment, following a sex scandal related to his secret marriage (and impregnation) of a Church employee.

Between 1966 and 1988, the Holy See would name 13 Black bishops. In 1984 they would issue their own pastoral letter entitled "What We Have Seen and Heard", explaining the nature, value, and strength of Black Catholicism. The next year, the United States Catholic Conference (a predecessor organization to the USCCB), with the help of Servant of God Thea Bowman, issued a document titled "Families: Black and Catholic, Catholic and Black", encouraging Black Catholics to maintain Black cultural traditions.

In 1987, the National Black Catholic Congress (NBCC) emerged as a purported successor to Daniel Rudd's Colored Catholic Congress movement of the late 19th century. It was founded as a nonprofit in conjunction with the NABCA and under the name of Fr John Ricard, future bishop of Pensacola-Tallahassee and future Superior General of the Josephites.

=== Papal visit (1987) ===
In September 1987, Pope John Paul II visited the United States, notably making a stop in New Orleans, which is considered one of the genesis points of Black Catholicism. There he engaged a number of cultural groups, including during a Mass at the Superdome, where jazz and gospel stylings were featured (including a rendition of "Lord, I Want to Be a Christian" sung by Servant of God Thea Bowman).

The next day, the Pope held a private audience with a group of 2,000 Black Catholics from all over the country (including all the nation's Black bishops), speaking to many of their social concerns and praising their "cultural heritage". During this meeting, a Black Catholic gospel choir sang at least one tune from the previous day's Mass.

=== Liturgical developments (late 1980s) ===
Also in 1987, the first and only Black Catholic hymnal was published; entitled Lead Me, Guide Me, it integrates numerous traditional Black Gospel hymns alongside a number of traditional Catholic hymns. The preface was penned by noteworthy Black Catholic liturgists Bishop James P. Lyke, future Archbishop of Atlanta; and Fr Norvel, then-president of the NBCCC. The foreword was written by Servant of God Thea Bowman, covering the development and value of African-American Christian worship. Fr J-Glenn Murray, a Black Jesuit, wrote an introduction explaining the compatibility of said worship with the Roman Rite of the Mass.

Two years later in 1989, Unity Explosion was founded in Dallas as an annual conference celebrating Black Catholic liturgy and expression. As of 2020, it has developed as a more general Black Catholic advocacy conference sponsored by the USCCB, and is preceded annually by a pre-conference, the Roderick J. Bell Institute for African-American Sacred Music.

That same year, Bowman, by then a celebrity of sorts (having appeared on 60 Minutes as well as The 700 Club) but ailing from cancer, was invited to address the USCCB on Black Catholicism. Dressed in a dashiki, she addressed the bishops on the history, legitimacy, and ongoing struggle of the Black Christian patrimony (interspersing the speech with her renditions of a variety of historic Black hymns). She ended the event by having the assembly link arms and join her in singing "We Shall Overcome".

==== Black Catholic rite ====
Despite offers in 1989 from two Black bishops (namely Terry Steib and future Archbishop Wilton Gregory) to sponsor and oversee Stallings's plans for an independent Black Catholic rite, the proposals of the late 80s were not developed. In early August 1989 the Washington Post reported that the NOBC had endorsed the formation of an independent rite, but subsequent reports indicated that no such decision had been officially made.

Fr George Stallings established an independent church in 1989, and was declared in February 1990 by the Archbishop of Washington to have excommunicated himself by his actions. He started a quasi-Catholic denomination, called Imani Temple, at first with one location. In 1989–1990, the Washington Post reported allegations by youths of having had relationships with Stallings when they were underage. In 2009 the archdiocese reached a $125,000 settlement with Gamal Awad, who said he was sexually abused at 14 by Stallings and a seminarian.

=== Watershed moments, rite survey and conclusion (1990s) ===
Fr Cyprian Davis published his History of Black Catholics in the United States (1990), covering Black history from Esteban's expedition in the 16th century to the period of the late 1980s. It remains the primary text for the general history of Black Catholics. That same year in July, he and his fellow Clergy Caucus members established Black Catholic History Month, to be celebrated each year in November.

In 1991, the National Association of Black Catholic Deacons began operations, and that same year, Sr Dr Jamie Phelps helped to revive the annual meetings of the BCTS. The Interregional African American Catholic Evangelization Conference (IAACE), a ministry training conference, also began meeting during this period (co-sponsored by the NABCA).

St Joseph's Black Catholic Church in Norfolk, having been merged with St Mary of the Immaculate Conception (Towson) in 1961, was renamed as Basilica of Saint Mary of the Immaculate Conception (Norfolk, Virginia). It was added to the National Register of Historic Places in 1979. After being restored in 1989 (its 100th anniversary as an independent parish), it was named a minor basilica in 1991: the first "Black basilica" and first minor basilica in Virginia. This was technically the parish's 200th anniversary, as St Joseph's had split off from a segregated White parish (Saint Patrick's) founded in 1791.

Around the same time, twin Divine Word priests Charles and Chester Smith, with their fellow Verbites Anthony Clark and Ken Hamilton, established the Bowman-Francis Ministry. This is a Black Catholic youth outreach ministry that also holds an annual Sankofa Conference.

At the behest of the Black Catholic Joint Conference, the annual meeting of the NBCCC, NBSC, NBCSA and NABCD (including the deacons' wives), a survey was taken of Black Catholics in the early 1990s to gauge the need for and interest in an independent rite. The NBCCC formed an African American Catholic Rite Committee (AACRC) and in 1991 published a monograph entitled "Right Rites", offering a proposal for a study that would be presented at the next year's Black Catholic congress. Their plan was much like the one earlier proposed by Stallings. Black Catholic theologian (and future bishop) Edward Braxton proposed an alternative plan, but neither was developed.

Though the 1995 results of the lay survey were ambiguous about a desire for an independent rite, debate ensued. Activists were concerned that the respondents may not have understood that such a rite was intended to be in full and unmitigated union with the rest of the Catholic Church, and wondered if they had been accurately informed about the prospect in general. Some also wondered whether the nation- (and Church-) wide emphasis on multiculturalism during that era had soured the prospect of a Black-centered endeavor.

Since the plenary councils of Baltimore in the 1800s, the bishops had floated similar proposals, but no action had been taken. The NBCCC's AACRC disbanded after the results of the survey were released.

== Reactions ==
While its more radical factions and experiments (especially the various ordeals in Chicago) were met with plenty of opposition, the movement on the whole was received well by the Church, as seen in the rapid acceptance of Fr Rivers' Black liturgical innovation level after Vatican II. The broad ecumenical (and interfaith) support for even Chicago's most boundary-pushing Black Unity Masses also displayed how much support existed for Black liberation at the time.

That said, the association with Black liberation (and the Black Panthers) did attract the attention of the Chicago Police Department, who surveilled at least one Panther-secured Black Unity Mass in Chicago, noting its uniqueness relative to the average Catholic liturgy (and dismissing it as such). A few months after Clements was named pastor of Holy Angels, the CPD and FBI assassinated his close friend and spiritual mentee Fred Hampton. Clements would celebrate the Funeral Mass.

Hierarchical opinions about Black liturgy notwithstanding, demands from Black Catholics for parishes, pastors bishops, archbishops, and cardinals of their choosing certainly rankled higher-ups from local dioceses all the way to the Vatican. Ambivalence was the most common response.

While most of the requests were eventually granted in one way or another, the resulting pendulum-swing away from radical activism—mirroring the larger decline of Black radicalism toward the end of the 20th century—has left Black Catholicism in something of a holding pattern since.

== Legacy ==
While racism continues to be an issue in American Catholicism, the Black Catholic Movement's legacy of inculturation and institutions continues to provide a buffer of sorts, providing previously nonexistent outlets for advocacy, protection, preservation, and perseverance.

With the exception of the NBCLC (now arguably replaced by the NBCC), the major national Black Catholic organizations and conferences continue to meet regularly, 52 years after the movement began and a quarter-century since it informally ended. The NBCC continues to issue a "Pastoral Plan of Action" periodically, and the various organizations have issued a number of statements—together and independently—concerning various issues of importance in the Black (and Black Catholic) community.

Roughly a quarter of Black Catholics worship in historically-Black parishes, and these institutions almost without exception preserve the form of Black Catholic worship and spiritual life developed during the Black Catholic Movement, mostly from the model of the larger Black Church.

== In popular culture ==
In 1987, Black Catholic theologian, historian, and liturgist Thea Bowman was profiled on 60 Minutes by Mike Wallace, whom she at one point famously persuaded to utter the phrase "Black is beautiful." This appearance caught the eye of Harry Belafonte, who eventually bought the film rights to her life story and recruited Whoopi Goldberg to portray her in a biopic. Bowman died soon after in 1991 from cancer and the film never materialized.

A year later, however, Goldberg portrayed a gospel-singing Black nun in the 1992 American musical comedy Sister Act. Its 1993 sequel featured a similar story, with Goldberg's character helping an interracial group of urban Catholic high school students form a choir and perform various forms of African-American music (especially gospel). A sequel is currently in the works for Disney+.

== Notable institutions ==
=== Organizations ===
- National Black Catholic Clergy Caucus (NBCCC)
  - National Black Catholic Seminarians' Association (NBCSA)
- National Black Sisters' Conference (NBSC)
- National Association of Black Catholic Deacons (NABCD)
- National Association of Black Catholic Administrators (NABCA)
  - Interregional African American Catholic Evangelization Conference (IAACEC)

=== Conferences ===
- Black Catholic Joint Conference (annual meeting of the NBCC, NBSC, NBCSA, NABCD, and the deacons' wives)
- National Black Catholic Congress (NBCC)
- National Black Catholic Men's Conference
- National Black Catholic Women's Gathering
- Archbishop Lyke Conference
- Unity Explosion
- Bowman-Francis Ministry
  - Sankofa Conference

=== Academic ===
- Institute for Black Catholic Studies (IBCS)
- Black Catholic Theological Symposium (BCTS)

== Notable figures ==
- Bishop Joseph Francis
- Fr George Clements
- Sister Mary Antona Ebo
- Sister Jamie Phelps, OP
- Fr Clarence Rivers
- Servant of God Thea Bowman
- Fr Cyprian Davis, OSB
- Archbishop James Lyke
- Bishop Harold Perry
- Fr Lawrence Lucas
- Bishop John Ricard, SSJ
- Archbishop Wilton Gregory
- Bishop Terry Steib
- Fr George Stallings
- Bishop Joseph L. Howze
- Archbishop Eugene Marino

== See also ==
- Black Catholicism
- National Black Catholic Congress
- Institute for Black Catholic Studies
- Black Catholic Theological Symposium
