= Black Catholicism =

African-American religious group

Black Catholicism or African-American Catholicism comprises the African-American people, beliefs, and practices in the Catholic Church.

There are around three million Black Catholics in the United States, making up 6% of the total population of African Americans, who are mostly Protestant, and 4% of American Catholics. Black Catholics in America are a heavily immigrant population, with 68% being born in the United States, 12% born in Africa, 11% born in the Caribbean and 5% born in other parts of Central or South America. About a quarter of Black Catholics worship in historically black parishes, most of which were established during the Jim Crow era as a means of racial segregation. Others were established in black communities and merely reflected the surrounding population, while the most recent crop came about due to population displacement (White flight) during and after the Great Migration.

Prior to the Second Vatican Council, Black Catholics attended Mass in Latin, as did the rest of the Western Church, and did not display much difference in terms of liturgy or spiritual patrimony. During the 1950s innovators such as Clarence Rivers began to integrate Negro spirituals into settings of the Mass; this trend eventually blossomed into the Black Catholic Movement during the larger Black Power zeitgeist of the late 1960s and 1970s. Some have termed this period the "Black Catholic Revolution" or the "Black Catholic Revolt". As this newfound Black Consciousness swept up many black clergy, consecrated religious, and laypeople, Black Catholicism came of age. Entire disciplines of Black Catholic studies emerged, Gospel Mass became a staple of Black Catholic parishes, Black Christian spirituality (formerly seen as Protestant) was also claimed by Black Catholics, and the Black Catholic Church emerged as a significant player in the public and ecclesial life of the larger American Church.

A large exodus of African-American Catholics (alongside other Catholics in America) during the 1970s was followed by a continually shrinking population of African Americans within the Catholic Church in the 21st century. A 2021 Pew Research study noted that only just over half of Black American adults who were raised Catholic still remain in the Church. In 2025, Cardinal Robert Prevost—a descendant of Black Creole Catholics in New Orleans—was elected Pope Leo XIV.

== Terminology ==
=== Definition ===
While the term "black" is often used in reference to any (Sub-Saharan and/or dark-skinned) African-descended person, the term in apposition to "Catholicism" is usually used to refer to African-Americans. This became solidified during the black pride movement of the late 60s and 70s, when blackness as an expressive cultural element became more and more popular in the public discourse. As "black" became the most common descriptor for African-Americans (replacing "negro"), so "Black Catholic" became the most common moniker for their Catholic adherents.

Developments in the expression of Catholicism among Black Catholics (especially within their own Catholic institutions) eventually led to a more independent identity within the Church, such that terms like "Black Catholicism" and "the Black Catholic Church" became more and more commonplace.

== History ==
=== Background (pre-slavery) ===
==== Biblical and Patristic era (1st–5th century) ====
Catholic Christianity among African-descended people has its roots in the earliest converts to Christianity, including Mark the Evangelist, the unnamed Ethiopian eunuch, Simon of Cyrene, and Simeon Niger. Several of the early Church Fathers were also native to Africa, including Clement of Alexandria, Origen, Tertullian, Athanasius, Cyril of Alexandria, Cyprian, and Augustine. Saints Perpetua and Felicity and Saint Maurice (as well as his military regiment), early martyrs, were also African. There have also been three African popes: Victor I, Melchaides (also a martyr), and Gelasius I. The vast majority of these Patristic-era figures resided in North Africa, where various Christian communities thrived until the Muslim conquests of the region. The Muslim takeover of Southern Spain (Al-Andalus) forced a significant Catholic community from there into North Africa, specifically Morocco; these individuals constituted the Mozarabic tradition.

There were multiple early Christian kingdoms in Africa, the most notable of which emerged in Ethiopia (then Aksum). Around this same era, however, there were also three Nubian Christian kingdoms, all of which were conquered and left little trace of their former glory; scholars have since recovered some of their history. Due to the Chalcedonian Schism in the 5th century, however, most of this Eastern (African) Christianity became divorced from Catholicism very early on.

Immediately prior to the dawn of the Transatlantic Slave Trade, Catholic Christianity in West Africa—the region that would produce virtually all of the individuals ending up in America as slaves—was primarily limited to converts borne from early European missionary contact, especially in the Kongo region. Roughly a century before Europe made contact with what would become the United States, the Portuguese entered the Kongo and began to make converts and engage in trade; there was also some limited slave-trading between the European power and their new African colleagues.

=== Slavery era (1400s–1867) ===
==== Kingdoms of Kongo and Ndongo (14th–17th century) ====
The Portuguese appetite for African slaves quickly grew beyond the intentions or capacity of the Kongolese people, leading to one Kongo ruler going so far as to write the Portuguese king for assistance in stemming the tide of citizens being taken captive from his land. Many of these victims would eventually be brought to the Americas, and some scholars have suggested their common cultural heritage and shared faith led them to instigate at least one major rebellion in the colonial United States. John Pedro (fl. 1623–1650s), a free Black Catholic from either Kongo or Ndongo, moved from Elizabeth City, Virginia to Maryland, and was executed for his participation in a "Catholic dissident faction".

==== Europe in North America (1528–1803) ====
===== Spain =====
The first African Catholic slaves that arrived in what would eventually become the United States primarily came during the period of Spanish colonization. Esteban, an African Catholic enslaved by Spaniards, was among the first European groups to enter the region in 1528, via what would become Florida. He would go on to serve on various other North American expeditions. The Afro-Spanish conquistador Juan Garrido entered Puerto Rico in 1509, helping to conquer it for the white Spanish settlers.

African Catholics, slave and free, were also among the Spanish settlers who established the Mission Nombre de Dios in the mid-16th century in what is now St. Augustine, Florida. Soon after, the newly established Spanish Florida territory was attracting numerous fugitive slaves from the Thirteen Colonies. The Spanish freed slaves who reached their territory if they converted to Catholicism. Most such freedmen settled at Gracia Real de Santa Teresa de Mose (Fort Mose), the first settlement of freed slaves in North America.

Spain also settled the California region with a number of African and mulatto Catholics, including at least ten (and up to 26) of the recently re-discovered Los Pobladores, the 44 founders of Los Angeles in 1781.

===== France =====
As more European nations became involved in the transatlantic slave trade, multiple colonial powers would join the Spanish in bringing African slaves to their colonies in North America. The French involvement would result in various new African Catholic communities, including the most famous, in Louisiana (specifically New Orleans). Here, slaves, affranchi (former slaves) and free people of color (blacks born free) formed a unique hierarchy within the larger American caste system, in which free people of color enjoyed the most privilege (and some even passed for white) and slaves the least—though more phenotypically black individuals faced various prejudices whether they were slave or free. Even so, French Catholicism (and its influence after the French no longer ruled the area) became notable for its degree of interracialism, in which much of Church life showed little to no racial discrimination.

===== Britain =====
The same could not be said of the thirteen American colonies of British America, where Catholicism was less common and social strictures were more pronounced and harsh. There was little to no distinction made between free-born blacks (who were rare) and freedmen, and while Catholic slave owners in Colonial America were under the same mandate as any Catholics in that they were obligated to convert, baptize, and meet the spiritual needs of their slaves, they were not under any local government codes to the same effect (as were the French) and often neglected their duties in this regard. After the Revolutionary War and the exit of France and Spain from most of North America, Black Catholics in America faced an increasingly unique situation as African-Americans living in slavery and after emancipation, segregation in the United States.

==== Antebellum and Civil War era (1776–1867) ====
===== Pierre Toussaint =====
During this period a number of Black Catholics would make a name for themselves, including Venerable Pierre Toussaint, a Haitian-American born into slavery and brought to New York shortly after the founding of the United States. Freed by his owner in 1807, he would go on to become a famous hairdresser, as well as a notable philanthropist alongside his wife Juliette. He is the first layperson to be buried in the crypt below the main altar of Saint Patrick's Cathedral on Fifth Avenue, normally reserved for bishops of the Archdiocese of New York.

===== First religious orders and parishes =====
The Oblate Sisters of Providence were founded by Haitian-American nun Mother Mary Elizabeth Lange and Fr James Nicholas Joubert in 1828 in Baltimore, in a time when black women were not allowed to join existing orders (which were all-white). The Oblates founded the all-girls Saint Frances Academy in the same year as their founding, the first and oldest continually-operating Black Catholic school in the US.

The Sisters of the Holy Family, founded in New Orleans in 1837 by Mother Henriette Delille, was similar in origin and purpose to the Oblates, though founded by and made up of Creole free women of color (i.e., mixed-race women who were never enslaved). They too dedicated themselves to education and have operated St. Mary's Academy in New Orleans since its founding in 1867. They also founded the first and oldest Catholic nursing home in the United States, Lafon Nursing Facility, in 1841.

That same year and in the same city, St Augustine's Catholic Church, the nation's oldest Black Catholic church, was founded by free blacks in the nation's oldest black neighborhood (Treme).

In 1843, Haitian-American Catholics in Baltimore established the Society of the Holy Family, a 200-member devotional group dedicated to Bible study, prayer, and especially singing. It was the first Black Catholic lay group in the US. The group would disband after two years when the archdiocese refused to let them use their large meeting hall.

In 1845, one of the founding members of the Oblate sisters, Theresa Maxis Duchemin, helped found a predominantly-white order of sisters in Michigan, the IHM congregation. She had been the first US-born Black Catholic religious sister when she helped found the Oblates. Notably, due to racism her name and history was scrubbed from the IHM sisters' records for 160 years, until the early 1990s.

===== Father Claude Maistre =====
In 1857, French Catholic priest Claude Paschal Maistre obtained faculties from Archbishop of New Orleans Antoine Blanc to pastor the city's newly created interracial Francophone parish, St Rose of Lima. There he ministered to a French-speaking congregation, encouraging them to form mutual aid societies (not unlike the one in Baltimore), including La Société des Soeurs de la Providence.

After the breakout of the Civil War a few years later and the subsequent occupation of New Orleans, Maistre and his new bishop Jean-Marie Odin clashed over the race issue, as Odin supported the Confederacy and Maistre the Union. The pastor promoted increasingly radical positions (including abolitionism), fueled by the much-publicized progressivism of French Catholic clergy in his homeland, President Lincoln, and local Afro-Creole activists.

===== St Augustine (D.C.) =====
In 1858, a group of free Black Catholics in Washington, D.C. opted out of their segregated status at St Matthew's cathedral (where they were forced to worship in the basement) and founded St Augustine Catholic Church (originally called St. Martin de Porres Catholic Church), the first Black Catholic parish in D.C., which runs D.C.'s oldest black school and is considered the "Mother Church of Black Catholics".

===== Historic St. Francis Xavier (Baltimore) =====
In 1863, the Jesuits helped a black congregation (then meeting in the basement of their St. Ignatius Church) purchase a building, which would then become known as St. Francis Xavier Church—the "first Catholic church in the United States for the use of an all-colored congregation". (Other Catholic churches also lay claim to being the first Black parish in America, including the interracial but mostly Black congregations of St. Augustine Catholic Church in New Orleans and another by the same name founded in 1829 in Natchitoches Parish, Louisiana.)

===== First seminarians and priests =====
A Black Catholic, William Augustine Williams, would enter seminary in 1853, albeit in Rome due to the ongoing prohibition of black seminarians and priests in the United States. Near the end of his studies (and after a series of discouraging indications and comments from his superiors), he dropped out of seminary in 1862, claiming that he longer felt he had a priestly vocation.

At least three Black Catholics (the Healy brothers) were ordained priests prior to the Emancipation Proclamation, though all three passed for white throughout their lives. Their race was known only to select mentors of theirs in the Church. One of them, James, would become in 1854 the first known African-American Catholic priest and the first such bishop in 1875. Another, Patrick, would in 1864 become the first black American to join a clerical religious order and the first black American Jesuit, in 1865 the first black American to earn a PhD, and in 1874 the first black president of a white or Catholic university in the US (Georgetown University). Other than these three, there are not known to have been any other Black Catholic priests in America between the first African Catholic contact in 1509 (in Puerto Rico) and the ordination of the first openly-Black Catholic priest in 1886.

=== Post-Emancipation (late 19th century) ===
==== Louisiana ====
After the Emancipation Proclamation, African-American Catholics became a single class of free black people, though the degree to which that freedom could be actualized varied.

In places such as Louisiana, old habits of separation between blacks born free and those born into slavery remained, which functioned partially on the basis of colorism but also on grounds of class, privilege, wealth, and social status. When parishes in places like New Orleans began to transition from the French tradition of interracialism to the American habit of strict racial segregation, Creoles (who tended to descend from free people of color) often resisted the move so as not to lose their elevated status as the more privileged milieu of African-Americans.

Upon the official announcement of the Emancipation Proclamation in 1863, Fr Maistre immediately desegregated St Rose's sacramental records—defying archdiocesan policy. A few months later, he celebrated a Mass championing Lincoln's edict, effectively ejecting his racist white parishioners and drawing death threats (including one from a fellow priest).

Abp Odin scolded Maistre for inciting "the love of liberty and independence" among slaves—eventually suspending him from ministry and placing the parish under interdict (making it a mortal sin to continue associating with Maistre sacramentally). Maistre defied the order(s), officiating—among other services—the funeral of Black Catholic Union Army Cpt André Cailloux, defiantly attended by many of the priest's admirers.

Members of the mutual aid society Maistre helped found would thereafter petition the archbishop for a Black Catholic parish named after "St. Abraham Lincoln". This request naturally went unfulfilled, and white-friendly Unionist agendas eventually led to the military-led reacquisition of St Rose by Odin in early 1864. Maistre, unfazed, inaugurated an illicit Black Catholic parish called Holy Name of Jesus, whose supporters Odin came to despise. Maistre continued to publicly advocate for radical causes, including the commemoration of John Brown's rebellion, the freeing of the slaves, and Lincoln's assassination, while also advocating for black citizenship and voting rights (which were briefly granted in Louisiana, beginning in 1868).

After Odin's death in 1870, New Orleans' next prelate, Napoléon Perché, restored Maistre's faculties, closed Holy Name of Jesus, and reassigned him to St. Lawrence (in relatively remote Terrebonne Parish). He would serve there until 1874, when health issues forced a return to New Orleans, where he lived in the archbishop's residence, until his death the next year. He was buried in St. Louis Cemetery #2 with the Black Catholics.

==== Prominent black figures ====
In 1886, the Black Catholic Ohioan Daniel Rudd went national with a Black Catholic newspaper called the American Catholic Tribune (originally a local paper as the Ohio State Tribune), which ran until 1899 in Cincinnati.

Black Catholics continued to center primarily in what would become the Washington D.C. Metropolitan Area. One of these communities, in Norfolk, Virginia, founded St Joseph's Black Catholic Parish in 1889—later becoming known as the "Black basilica".

That same year, Mother Mathilda Beasley, the first African-American nun to serve in Georgia, started a short-lived order of black nuns in Savannah. She would also go on to start one of the first orphanages in the US for African-American girls.

Other areas also counted Black Catholics, including Missouri, which—also in 1889—produced the nation's first openly-Black Catholic priest, Augustus Tolton. Born a slave in Ralls County, he, his siblings and his mother found freedom in Illinois; he would later, with the help of supportive American bishops and Vatican officials, attend seminary and be ordained in Europe (not unlike the Healy brothers). He went on to minister in Illinois, was declared Venerable in 2019, and could be declared a saint soon.

Another Black Catholic from this era with an open cause for canonization, Servant of God Julia Greeley, was also born in Ralls County as a slave, before being taken to Denver in 1861. She converted to Catholicism in 1880, became a street evangelist and Secular Franciscan, and ministered to the poor for the rest of her life (always at night, to avoid embarrassing white people she served).

==== Organizing ====
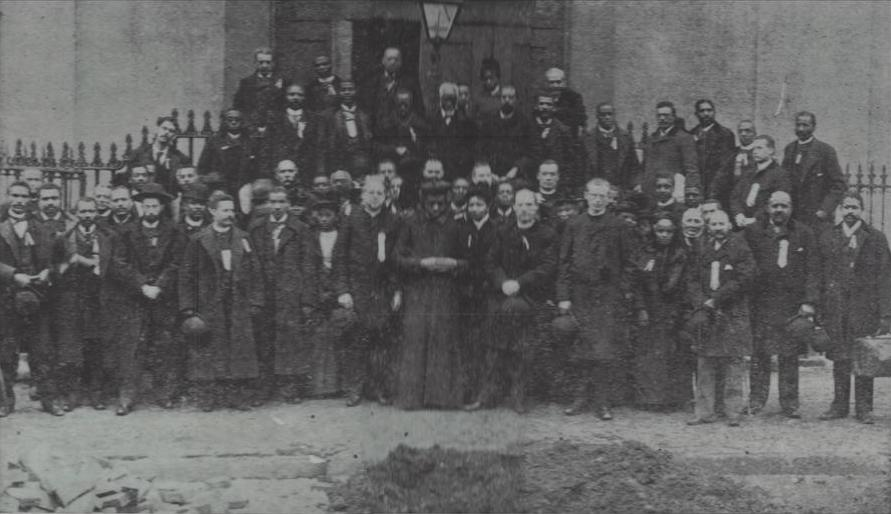
Portrait of the attendees at the 1892 Colored Catholic Congress. Front and center is Fr Augustus Tolton, the nation's first openly-Black Catholic priest.

Black Catholics would soon begin to organize at the national level as well, first as the Colored Catholic Congress in 1889 under the leadership of the aforementioned Daniel Rudd. Their inaugural gathering would include the audience of President Grover Cleveland and a Mass celebrated by Fr Tolton. This group would meet annually for five years before shuttering.

In 1891, Philadelphia heiress Saint Katharine Drexel founded the Sisters of the Blessed Sacrament, a religious order dedicated to serving the black and Native American communities, and went on to found and staff countless Black Catholic schools for that purpose. She was canonized in the year 2000.

=== Missions era (1890s–1950s) ===
==== The Josephites ====
From the period immediately preceding Emancipation, various Catholic missions organizations began to dedicate themselves to the task of converting and ministering to black Americans, who were then for the most part held in slavery. Upon their gaining freedom, they became even more of a target, as a group now more freely able to choose their religious persuasion and activities.

Chief among these missionaries were the Mill Hill Fathers, a British religious order that operated in America largely as a black missions organization. As part of their efforts, they recruited a number of candidates for the priesthood, including an African-American named Charles Uncles. He would go on to become, in 1891, the first Black Catholic priest ordained in the United States.

By 1893, the head of the Mill Hill society's American operations, Fr John R. Slattery, had convinced the Mill Hill superior to let the American wing spin off into its own religious society dedicated totally to African-American ministry. This would result in the founding of the Society of St. Joseph of the Sacred Heart, most commonly known today as the Josephites. Slattery was named the first Superior general and Fr Uncles was among the founding members, another first for a Black Catholic. Slattery founded the Josephite Harvest, the society's missions magazine, in 1888; it remains the longest-running such publication in the United States.

Racism within and outside of the society would sour the priestly experience for Fr Uncles, and he considered himself no longer a member of the order by the time of his death in 1933. For this and various other reasons, Fr Slattery would eventually resign from his post, the priesthood, and eventually apostatize from the Church altogether in 1906. Subsequent Josephite superiors would scarcely accept or ordain blacks, and this lasted for several decades.

==== Comité des Citoyens ====
In the late 19th century, Black Catholics in New Orleans began to join with Whites and other activists to oppose segregation, with the Crescent City being one of the few American locales to have previously experienced a much more interracial climate (this being while under French and Spanish rule).

In 1892, the Citizen's Committee of New Orleans (French: Comité des Citoyens) organized direct action against the streetcar companies in the city in an attempt to force the courts to take action. This involved Homer Plessy, a light-skinned biracial Black Catholic (and member of St. Augustine Church), boarding a Whites-only streetcar, informing the operator that he was Black, and being arrested. The Committee hoped that, as the resulting court case advanced, segregation laws would be overturned. Instead, the opposite occurred, and the US Supreme Court ruled in Plessy v. Ferguson that segregation was in fact legal nationwide. The decision would cast a dark shadow on the Black freedom struggle for the next 60 years.

==== New national organizations ====
At the same time, Black Catholics began to organize once again on the national level. Another Black Catholic newspaper, The Catholic Herald, operated during this period—though, unlike Rudd's earlier effort, TCH had the official endorsement of the Church (via Cardinal Gibbons). One extant issue exists from 1905.

With African Americans being barred from entry into the Knights of Columbus due to racism, Fr John Henry Dorsey (the second Black Catholic priest ordained in the US, and the second such Josephite) and six others from the Most Pure Heart of Mary parish in Mobile, Alabama, founded the Knights of Peter Claver in 1909; they remain the largest Black Catholic fraternal order.

In 1925, the Federated Colored Catholics formed under the leadership of NAACP co-founder Thomas Wyatt Turner, and would go on to address a variety of Black Catholic concerns, including the restrictive Josephite policies concerning black applicants. The federation did not see much success on this front, however, despite friends in high places (such as the Vatican), and would undergo a split in the 1930s after two of the most powerful leaders in the group (white Jesuits William Markoe and John LaFarge, Jr.) steered the group in a more interracial direction (against Turner's will). The splintering would result in LaFarge's Catholic Interracial Council of New York.

LaFarge also helped found the Cardinal Gibbons Institute in Maryland, a Catholic school established in 1924 for Black Catholics, but clashed with the school's administrators "over many of the same issues with which he disagreed with Turner", and the school closed in 1933.

Society of African Missions, St. Anthony's Mission House, and the Franciscan Handmaids of the Most Pure Heart of Mary

The Society of African Missions began ministry in the United States in 1906, being given authority over Black Catholic ministry in the whole of the Diocese of Savannah—nine years after Fr. Ignatius Lissner first arrived stateside to promote SMA activities and fundraising. The diocese then encompassed the whole of the state of Georgia, and as such Lissner and other SMA priests were responsible for founding some of the oldest Black parishes there (including Our Lady of Lourdes Catholic Church in Atlanta, and St. Peter Claver Catholic Church in Macon's Pleasant Hill Historic District).

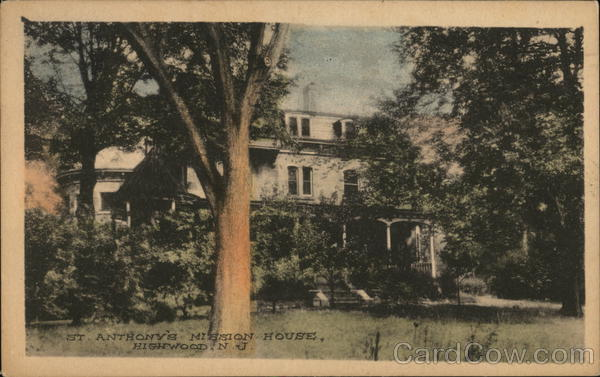
St. Anthony's Mission House, a racially integrated minor seminary founded by Fr Ignatius Lissner of the Society of African Missions in 1921. Originally located in Highwood, Bergen County, New Jersey.

During his time in Savannah, Lissner also helped found the Franciscan Handmaids of the Most Pure Heart of Mary, in response to a Georgia law banning White teachers from teaching Black students. Lissner enlisted the help of Mary Theodore Williams to found an order of Black nuns to teach there instead. The Handmaids were founded in 1917 and the group remained there in Georgia before following Lissner to New Jersey in the 1920s, and later moving to New York.

Lissner started in 1921 what was at the time the United States' only integrated seminary, St. Anthony's Mission House in Bergen County, New Jersey. Black men were otherwise barred from all but one US Catholic seminary, and Lissner envisioned St. Anthony's as a solution. Racism from the US bishops thwarted his goal, however, and only a few men are known to have been ordained from St. Anthony's. It closed in 1926.

The US province of the SMAs was established in 1941 with Lissner as its first provincial superior. His administration established Queen of Apostles Seminary near Boston, Massachusetts, which lasted from 1946 to the late 1960s.

==== Divine Word Society and St. Augustine Seminary ====
After World War I, various clerical orders other than the Josephites would begin to pursue black ministry and vocations, most notably the Society of the Divine Word. Partially due to the drought of black Josephite priests, the Divine Word missionaries opted to open a seminary in Mississippi specifically for African-Americans in 1920, so as to more fully open the door for them to holy orders. This venture, St. Augustine Seminary, was largely a success, and within a decade they had ordained a number of well-received black priests.

==== Xavier University of Louisiana and Claver College ====
In 1925, St Katharine Drexel used her fortune and connections to help found Xavier University of Louisiana (XULA) in New Orleans, the first and only Catholic HBCU. She also helped found a second, short-lived Black Catholic college in Guthrie, Oklahoma, known as Claver College; it folded 1944 after 11 years.

==== First Great Migration ====
Around the same time, blacks were beginning to migrate by the millions from the Jim Crow South to greener pastures north of the Mason-Dixon line and west of Mississippi and the Rockies. This resulted in mass exposure of traditionally-Protestant African-Americans to Catholic religion in places like Chicago, New York City, and Los Angeles. As black families moved in, white families often moved out, leaving entire parishes—and, more importantly, parochial schools—open to the new black residents. This, combined with a missionary impulse on the part of local white clerics and nuns, led to mass recruitment of black Protestants to these schools, and eventually the parishes as well. African-Americans converted in droves, perhaps most notably in Chicago.

===== Chicago =====
The boom in Black Catholics in the North created an immediate opportunity for organizing and activism, which quickly took place—and in a markedly interracial (and even interfaith) fashion. The Catholic Youth Organization (CYO) was founded in Chicago in 1930 and quickly became a hotspot for integrated Catholic activity. Dr. Arthur G. Falls, a major Black Catholic figure during this era, persuaded Servant of God Dorothy Day to open a Catholic Worker House there in 1935. Lafarge's Interracial Council movement arrived in the city in 1945.

Even so, White flight combined with Archbishop George Mundelein's "national parish" strategy to more or less sanctify racial segregation in Chicago, as Black Catholics—despite not technically constituting a nationality—were "consigned" to such a parish themselves.

===== Harlem Renaissance =====
Another effect of the Great Migration was an intersection with the Harlem Renaissance, wherein black intellectuals in NYC fomented an artistic revolution that made waves across the country. Mary Lou Williams, a prominent jazz artist in the movement, converted to Catholicism around this time, as did Billie Holiday and Claude McKay. A minor figure in the movement, Ellen Tarry, also became Catholic and wrote a number of religious works.

===== Integration of seminaries =====
In the South, the successes of the Divine Word society in ordaining black priests, as well as other propitious factors, led to the integration of other orders (an early example being the Benedictines in Collegeville and St. Meinrad Archabbey during the 1940s) as well as a number of dioceses. The Josephites would soon fully open their seminary, St. Joseph's, to blacks as well.

=== Civil Rights era (1950s–1960s) ===
This growth in Black Catholic laypeople as well as priests would soon coalesce with the growing Civil rights movement to create a desire for more authentic recognition of black freedom and self-oversight within the Church, as racism and prejudice continued to be a thorn in the side of the booming Black Catholic community (e.g., the Jesuit Bend Incident).

However, there would come a taste of the future in 1953, when the Dominican Divine Word priest Fr Joseph O. Bowers became the first openly-Black Catholic bishop consecrated in the United States (though for service in Accra, in Africa); before departing for the motherland, he would ordain two black Divine Word seminarians—a black-on-black first. At that time, there were just over a hundred Black Catholic priests—compared to about 50,000 white.

Bowers would attend an ecumenical council in 1962, Vatican II (1962–1965).

When the Civil Rights Movement first began, much of the Catholic Church, black and white, was uninterested. Many that were interested, given the potential for activist witness to Catholic social teaching, were met with scorn and derision, especially members of religious orders. The Josephites, for example, saw race consciousness as a threat—even a disqualifying character trait for blacks applying for their order. Many female religious orders did not allow their members, black or white, to march or protest for civil rights.

Black Catholics were involved early on in the Civil Rights Movement, and James Chaney—one of the three victims in the Freedom Summer Murders—was said to be devout. Diane Nash, a prominent lunch-counter demonstrator, Freedom Rider, voter registration advocate, and Student Nonviolent Coordinating Committee (SNCC) co-founder, was also Catholic. Later, Mary Louise Smith preceded Rosa Parks as one of the first people arrested in the runup to the Montgomery bus boycott.

Eventually, as the movement entered full-swing, Catholics of all stripes would begin to participate, with white and black laypeople, priests, religious brothers, sisters, and nuns joining the fray—with some even becoming notable as such. One Religious Sister, Mary Antona Ebo, F.S.M. was sent by the Archdiocese of St Louis to march in Selma with five other "Sisters of Selma", where she ended up being interviewed and hailed as a folk hero.

"Yes, I am a Negro, and I am very proud of it."

— Sr Antona Ebo, March 10, 1965 (following Turnaround Tuesday)

Ebo would go on to become the first African-American woman to administer a hospital in the United States (St. Clare Hospital in Baraboo, Wisconsin).

=== Black Catholic movement (late 1960s–1990s) ===
==== Beginnings ====
In 1962, Pope John XXIII convened the most recent Catholic ecumenical council, Vatican II. A major change emanating from the council was the elimination of Latin as the required liturgical language of the Western portion of the Church.

This change opened to the door for inculturation in places where it had not been dreamed of—but also in places where it had been. As early as the 1950s, under the creative eye of Black Catholics such as Fr Clarence Rivers, the fusion of black Gospel music with Catholic liturgy had been experimented with on a basic level. Rivers' music (and musical direction) was used at the first official English-language Mass in the United States in 1964, including his watershed work, "God Is Love".

Alongside this nascent inculturation came a second boom in Black Catholic numbers, as they increased by 220,000 (35%) during the 1960s—over half being converts. In 1966, Fr Harold R. Perry became the first openly-black bishop to serve in the US when he was named auxiliary bishop of New Orleans.

Following the assassination of Martin Luther King and its associated riots (including Mayor Daley's shoot-to-kill order in Chicago), Black Catholics inaugurated a number of powerful new organizations in early 1968, including the National Black Catholic Clergy Caucus (NBCC), organized by Fr Herman Porter, and its sister organization, the National Black Sisters' Conference (NBSC), organized by Sr Martin de Porres Grey.

The movement was headed off by the statement that came out of the inaugural NBCCC meeting in Detroit, in which the caucus members declared in the opening line that "the Catholic Church in the United States is primarily a white, racist institution."

At least two of the requests made in the statement were answered rather quickly, as—with the help of a white Josephite superior general who advocated for it as early as 1967—the permanent diaconate was restored in the United States in October 1968, and the National Office for Black Catholics (NOBC) was established in 1970.

==== Growth (1969–1971) ====
It could be said the movement/revolution centered in Chicago, where a large number of Black Catholics resided in the late 1960s, forming sizable black parishes—though always under the leadership of white priests. Fr George Clements, one of the more radical(ized) members of the inaugural NBCCC meeting, entered into an extended row with Archbishop John Cody over this lack of black pastors in Chicago and Black Catholic inculturation.

Unconventional alliances with local black Protestant leaders and black radical activists resulted in innovative (and defiant) liturgical celebrations known as Black Unity Mass, trans-parochial events where black priests donned Afrocentric vestments, decorated the altar similarly, and celebrated the Mass with a decidedly "black" liturgical flair. One such Mass in 1969 included an 80-voice gospel choir provided by the Rev. Jesse Jackson and security provided by the Black Panthers.

One of the first parishes to establish a gospel choir was St. Francis de Sales Catholic Church in New Orleans, in 1969 (now known as St. Katharine Drexel Catholic Church). One of the first musicians to experiment similarly was Grayson Warren Brown, a Presbyterian convert who set the entire Mass to gospel-style music. Fr William Norvel, a Josephite, helped introduce gospel choirs to Black Catholic parishes nationwide (especially in D.C. and Los Angeles). This "Gospel Mass" trend quickly spread across the nation.

==== Education reform and exodus (1971–1975) ====
After the NOBC was allotted only 30% of their requested funding for 1970 by the United States Conference of Catholic Bishops (USCCB) and after Cardinal O'Boyle (a staunch supporter of Civil Rights) announced his retirement, a delegation of Black Catholics led by the National Black Catholic Lay Caucus (NBCLC, or NBLCC) president brought their grievances all the way to the Vatican in 1971.

That same year, the NBSC, NOBC, and Black Catholic laypeople spearheaded a national campaign to stop the mass closings of Catholic schools in urban and predominantly-black communities.

The unrest extended into seminaries as well—including the Josephites', where tensions between the more race-conscious black students/members and their white peers as well as teachers/elders (black and white) boiled over into open hostility, leading to an emptying of much of the seminary and the resignation of a number of Josephite priests. By 1971, the seminary had closed for studies. To this day, Josephite seminarians study at nearby universities and their vocations from black Americans has never recovered.

This phenomenon of resignation was felt across Black Catholicism in the 1970s and coincided with a general nadir of American Catholicism overall (the latter being more or less unrelated to race issues). Catholics of all races began lapsing in droves, and between 1970 and 1975, hundreds of Black Catholic seminarians, dozens (~13%) of Black Catholic priests, and 125 black nuns (~14%) left their posts, including NBCS foundress Sr Martin de Porres Grey in 1974. Up to 20% of Black Catholics stopped practicing.

==== New organizations, major thinkers and USCCB letter (late 1970s) ====
Even with the decline in vocations and lay practice during the 1970s, various new national Black Catholic organizations emerged. In 1976, the National Association of Black Catholic Administrators (NABCA) was founded, a consortium of the diocesan Black Catholic offices/ministries from around the country. Eventually this organization effectively replaced the NOBC, after a major conflict between the Office and the NBSC involving leadership disputes.

The Black Catholic Theological Symposium (BCTS), a yearly gathering dedicated to the promotion of Black Catholic theology, emerged in 1978 in Baltimore. From it has emerged some of the leading voices not only in Black Catholic theology, but in Womanist and black theology as well: writers such as Dr. Diana L. Hayes, Dr. M. Shawn Copeland, Sr Jamie T. Phelps, OP, Fr Cyprian Davis, OSB, and Servant of God Thea Bowman have had an immeasurable impact in advancing the cause of Black Catholic history, theology, theory, and liturgy.

The next year, the Institute for Black Catholic Studies was founded at Xavier University of Louisiana. Every summer since, it has hosted a variety of accredited courses on Black Catholic theology, ministry, ethics, and history, offering a Continuing education & Enrichment program as well as a Master of Theology degree—"the only graduate theology program in the western hemisphere taught from a Black Catholic perspective".

That same year, the USCCB issued a pastoral letter dissecting and condemning racism, entitled "Brothers and Sisters to Us", for the first time addressing the issue in a group publication.

==== George Stallings, notable black bishops, and the Black Catholic rite (1980s – early 1990s) ====
The end of the Black Catholic Movement could be said to have been precipitated by one Fr George Stallings, a Black Catholic priest known for his fiery activism and no-holds-barred demands of the Church. He was a vocal leader in pressing for a Black Catholic rite (complete with bishops and the associated episcopal structure) during the 70s and 80s. He would later schism and establish the African-American Catholic Congregation.

Some of those calls were answered when Eugene A. Marino was named auxiliary bishop of Washington in 1974, and when Joseph L. Howze became the first openly-Black Catholic bishop of a diocese when he was named Bishop of Biloxi in 1977. Marino would become the first-ever Black Catholic archbishop in 1988, following an open demand made to the USCCB in 1985. Marino would resign from his archbishopric two years after his appointment, following a sex scandal involving his secret marriage (and impregnation) of a Church employee.

Between 1966 and 1988, the Holy See would name 13 black bishops, and in 1984 these bishops would issue their own pastoral letter entitled "What We Have Seen and Heard", explaining the nature, value, and strength of Black Catholicism.

(Also of note was one bishop, Raymond Caesar, SVD, who was a native of Eunice, Louisiana but was later appointed as a bishop in Papua New Guinea in 1978. He was the first and only African American to be made a bishop of a foreign diocese, and is typically not included in lists of US black bishops.)

===== Revived Congress movement and liturgical explorations =====
In 1987, the National Black Catholic Congress (NBCC) emerged as a purported successor to Daniel Rudd's Colored Catholic Congress movement of the late 19th century, this time founded as a nonprofit under the name of Fr John Ricard, future bishop of Pensacola-Tallahassee and future Superior General of the Josephites, in collaboration with the NABCA.

That same year, the first and only Black Catholic hymnal was published; entitled "Lead Me, Guide Me", it integrates a litany of traditional black Gospel hymns alongside a number of traditional Catholic hymns. The preface was penned by noteworthy Black Catholic liturgists, explaining the history and compatibility of black Christian worship with the Roman Rite of the Mass.

Two years later in 1989, Unity Explosion was founded in Dallas as an annual conference celebrating Black Catholic liturgy and expression. It would grow into a more general Black Catholic advocacy conference sponsored by the USCCB, and is preceded annually by a pre-conference, the Roderick J. Bell Institute for African-American Sacred Music.

==== Watershed moments (1990s) ====
In 1990, Benedictine Fr Cyprian Davis published "History of Black Catholics in the United States", a book that covered the history of Black Catholics from Esteban's expedition in the 16th century all the way to the period of the late 80s. It remains the primary text for the general history of Black Catholics. That same year in July, he and his fellow Clergy Caucus members established Black Catholic History Month, to be celebrated each year in November.

In 1991, the National Association of Black Catholic Deacons began operations, and that same year, Sr Jamie Phelps helped to restart the annual meetings of the BCTS.

The aforementioned St Joseph's Black Catholic Church in Norfolk, having been merged with St Mary of the Immaculate Conception (Towson) in 1961 and renamed as such, was named a minor basilica in 1991—allegedly the first "black basilica" (though preceded by Our Lady of Sorrows Basilica in Chicago) and the first minor basilica in Virginia.

Around the same time, twin Divine Word priests Charles and Chester Smith, with their fellow Verbites Anthony Clark and Ken Hamilton, established the Bowman-Francis Ministry, a Black Catholic youth outreach ministry, and its yearly Sankofa Conference.

At the behest of the Black Catholic Joint Conference—the annual meeting of the NBCCC, NBSC, NBCSA and NABCD (including the deacons' wives)—a survey was taken of Black Catholics in the early 1990s to gauge the need for and interest in an independent rite; the NBCCC formed an African American Catholic Rite Committee (AACRC) and in 1991 published a monograph entitled "Right Rites", offering a proposal for a study that would be presented at the next year's Black Catholic Congress. Their plan was much like Stallings'. Black Catholic theologian (and future bishop) Edward Braxton proposed an alternative plan, but neither would come to fruition.

Similar proposals had been floated by the bishops themselves as far back as the Plenary Councils of Baltimore in the 1800s, but the desire to do much for Black Catholics was incredibly sparse then and no action was taken. History repeated itself, and the AACRC disbanded after the results of the survey were released.

== 21st century ==
=== Firsts ===
In 2001, Bishop Wilton Gregory of Belleville was appointed president of the United States Conference of Catholic Bishops (USCCB), the first African American ever to head an episcopal conference.

=== African interplay and the Josephites ===
Native African priests have come to outnumber African-American priests in the United States, with the former often pastoring black parishes. The Josephites, the one clerical order ministering specifically to African-Americans, receives almost all of their seminarians, brothers and priests from Nigeria.

A documentary on the Josephites, Enduring Faith, was released on PBS in 2000, written, produced, and directed by Paul Lamont and narrated by Andre Braugher. It was nominated for an Emmy in 2001, and received Telly, Crystal Communicator, Proclaim, and US International Film and Video Festival awards.

The Josephites—having then for nearly 120 years been ministering specifically to African Americans—would make history in 2011, at long last appointing an African American, Fr Norvel, as their first black superior general. Norvel was instrumental in shifting the order's vocational focus to Africa.

=== Worship ===
A Black Catholic liturgical conference similar to Unity Explosion developed in New Orleans in 2004, the Archbishop Lyke Conference, named after the aforementioned Black Catholic liturgist. In 2012, a second edition of the "Lead Me, Guide" hymnal was released.

Following the Vatican's approval of the Zaire Use (a unique Congolese form of the Roman Rite) in 1988, various Black Catholic parishes in the U.S. began to implement at least some its rubrics. Two parishes in the San Francisco Bay Area, St Columba in Oakland and St Paul of the Shipwreck in the Bayview neighborhood of San Francisco, made such implementations with the help of Black Catholic professor and music minister M. Roger Holland II.

Fr Michael Pfleger, a white priest and activist pastoring Saint Sabina Church, a Black Catholic parish in Chicago, has helped introduce yet more modem black forms of worship to the Mass, including the use of a "praise team" (a smaller vocal ensemble that generally sings contemporary gospel rather than traditional) and other elements drawn from the more contemporary black Church (and even Pentecostal) tradition.

=== Documents ===
In 2015, the USCCB issued a series of documents in commemoration of the 50th anniversary of the Civil Rights Movement, including a "Black Catholic History Rosary" created by Dr. Kirk P. Gaddy.

As part of the NBCC Congress XII proceedings in 2017, representatives appointed by bishops from every diocese in the United States issued a "Pastoral Plan of Action" meant to address the needs of Black Catholics nationwide.

A year later, the USCCB issued its first pastoral letter against racism in 39 years, following the first wave of Black Lives Matter protests. Entitled "Open Wide Our Hearts: The Enduring Call to Love", it did not directly endorse (or mention) BLM, condemned, and was voted against by three bishops; one other bishop abstained.

USCCB President Abp José Gomez and Black Catholic Bishop Shelton J. Fabre (chairman of the USCCB Ad Hoc Committee Against Racism) would both issue anti-racism statements in 2020 after the murder of George Floyd, amidst the second round of BLM protests. The BLM movement was again not endorsed.

A joint statement in July 2020 from the NBSC, IBCS, NABCA, NBCCC, and the Bowman-Francis Ministry directly supported the BLM movement.

=== Hierarchy, numbers, and Pope Leo XIV ===
In early 2019, Bishop Roy Campbell took over leadership of the NBCC.

That same year, the Archbishop Wilton Gregory of Atlanta was named by Pope Francis as Archbishop of Washington, considered by many to be the most important diocese in the country. He was the first African American to hold the post. The appointment was also notable in that archbishops of that see are typically named cardinals, a position no African American has held.

On October 25, 2020, Pope Francis announced that he would indeed name Gregory a cardinal at a consistory scheduled for November 28, which made him the first African-American member of the College of Cardinals. Following his retirement in 2025, only two African-American Catholic bishops remained active in the United States.

Following the trend of Catholic disaffiliation in the late 20th century, 2021 Pew Research study noted that just over half of Black American adults who were raised Catholic still remain in the Church.

In 2025, Cardinal Robert Prevost was elected Pope Leo XIV, hours before it was revealed that he is maternally descended from Black Creole Catholics in New Orleans. The mixed-race family of Leo's mother migrated to Chicago in the early 20th century and thereafter began to identify as White on the census.

== Theology ==
=== General ===
Generally speaking, Black Catholics hold to mainstream Catholic theology, often supplemented and enriched in various ways by beliefs common to the black church. These usually include a palpable belief in the omnipresence and omnipotence of God in daily life struggles, a commitment to the justice of God in various social and political contexts, a strong sense of hope in the face of struggle, a spiritualization of various aspects of everyday experiences, the elevation of Christian faith as a bedrock of the community, and the conviction that worship unlocks the blessings of God.

=== Academic ===
The more formal academic classification known as Black Catholic theology formally emerged within the Black Catholic Movement of the late 1960s on through the 1990s. This new discipline coincided (and indeed collaborated) with the genesis of black theology, such that the former can be considered a subset of the latter. At least one Black Catholic priest, Fr Lawrence Lucas, was involved with the latter movement even from its earliest days.

Due to this kind of interplay, Black Catholic theology takes many cues from liberation theology and from the (predominantly Protestant) black (liberation) theology movement, especially the latter's emphasis on the African-American struggle and how it relates to the story and liberating message of the Bible and of Jesus Christ.

Womanism, the theological movement led by and focusing on the perspectives of black women, is also an important aspect of Black Catholic theology, as many or most of the formal Black Catholic theologians have been women associated with that movement and its theories, including Drs. M. Shawn Copeland, Diana L. Hayes, and C. Vanessa White.

A number of prominent Black Catholic theologians, including Drs. Hayes, Copeland, Craig A Ford Jr., and Fr Bryan Massingale have been accused of magisterial dissent (especially on topics related to the LGBT community), and there is evidence of such in some of their writings.

== Practices ==
=== Gospel Mass ===
==== Music ====
===== Black Gospel =====
Black Catholic worship consists of the Roman Rite Mass, like most any other Catholic group in America, but tends to use black Gospel hymns and/or style for the propers (Entrance, Responsorial, Alleluia, Offertory, Communion, Post-communion, and Recessional), ordinaries (Kyrie, Gloria, Sanctus, and Agnus Dei), and the Our Father. In some black parishes, the traditional form of a given hymn may be forgone altogether in favor of an equivalent gospel tune (e.g., "Hallelujah, Salvation And Glory" for the Alleluia, a gospel-ized "Holy, Holy, Holy" for the Sanctus, etc.).

While in most American parishes, Daily Mass (held on weekdays and before 4 pm on Saturdays) involves no singing, some black parishes use at least some singing (such as the Communion hymn) in such liturgies.

The late 1980s brought the release of "Lead Me, Guide Me", the first and only Black Catholic hymnal, including numerous songs from the black Christian tradition as well as some Catholic hymns. The second edition was published by GIA in 2012. (Many black parishes opt for non-hymnal gospel selections, however.)

===== Jazz =====
Some black parishes (e.g., St. Augustine and Our Lady of Guadalupe in New Orleans) celebrate "Gospel Jazz Mass" every Sunday, integrating not only gospel but also the other major form of indigenous (black) American music—which is in fact derived from gospel itself.

The Archdioceses of San Francisco celebrated an annual Gospel Jazz Mass at their cathedral (with music performed by a mass choir from multiple historically black parishes in the area). The Diocese of San Jose celebrates a similar liturgy at their cathedral during the city's annual jazz festival, as does Vacaville's St. Mary's Catholic Church during theirs.

==== Dance ====
Another black Protestant tradition now seen in many Black Catholic parishes is that of dance. This includes "praise dancing", an individual or group-based choreographed liturgical dance performed to the tune of popular gospel songs.

Some Black Catholic liturgies even feature "praise breaks"/"shouts", an unchoreographed form liturgical dance done in conjunction with fast-paced (and often improvised) instrumental gospel music; Historic St. Francis Xavier Church in Baltimore claims to be the first to have integrated this form of worship.

==== Preaching ====
While Catholic homilies are known for their brevity (relative to Protestant sermons), messages given at black parishes tend to be lengthier and even more emotive—not unlike their black Protestant equivalents, which are known to be the lengthiest among American Christian groups. This is often seen with Black Catholic ministers who were themselves raised in the black Christian tradition (be it Catholic or Protestant) or otherwise disposed to this style of preaching.

==== Rite ====
Gospel Mass is a de facto form of the Roman Rite Mass, but currently has no official canonical designation by the Church. As such, the Zaire Use—the only inculturated form of the Novus Ordo introduced since Vatican II—has gained popularity with some black parishes as a supplement to the extant Gospel Mass form (in lieu of an official African-American rite, a topic not broached since the early 90s).

=== Prayer ===
Also somewhat unique within American Catholicism is the emphasis on prayer among Black Catholics. While this often involves more traditional rote prayers such as the Rosary or other Catholic devotions, the Black Catholic Movement brought about the more common use of relatively lengthy extemporaneous prayers, both during and outside of liturgical celebrations.

The movement also brought about rote prayers specific to the black experience, including a number of prayer books.

== Population ==
There are about 1.76 million US- or Caribbean-born Black Catholics in America. They are largely centered in the major metro areas of the country. New York—the most populous US city—also has the most Black Catholics, followed (in no particular order) by Los Angeles, Chicago, Miami, Houston, Philadelphia, Detroit, Atlanta, New Orleans, Oakland, Baltimore, and the D.C. metro area.

The United States is said to have approximately 250 non-immigrant Black Catholic priests.

== Institutions ==
While there is no official hierarchy specific to Black Catholicism, the various organizations and conferences associated with it are seen as leadership outlets.

=== Religious orders with predominantly black membership and/or significant black ministry ===
- Oblate Sisters of Providence
- Sisters of the Holy Family
- Society of St. Joseph of the Sacred Heart (Josephites)
- Society of the Divine Word (Verbites)
- Sisters of the Blessed Sacrament
- Franciscan Handmaids of Mary
- Society of St. Edmund (Edmundites)
- Society of African Missions

=== Organizations ===
==== Associations ====
- National Black Catholic Clergy Caucus
  - National Black Catholic Seminarians' Association
- National Black Sisters' Conference

==== Conferences ====
- Black Catholic Joint Conference (annual meeting of the NBCC, NBSC, NBCSA, NABCD, and the deacons' wives)
- National Black Catholic Congress

==== Academic ====
- Institute for Black Catholic Studies
- Black Catholic Theological Symposium

== Notable figures ==
=== Black saints ===
Several Black Catholics have open causes for canonization:

- Venerable Pierre Toussaint
- Venerable Augustus Tolton
- Venerable Henriette DeLille
- Venerable Mary Lange
- Servant of God Julia Greeley
- Servant of God Thea Bowman
- Servant of God Martin de Porres Ward

=== Bishops (living) ===
==== Ordinaries ====
===== (active) =====
====== Archbishops ======
- Cardinal Wilton Cardinal Gregory (Washington, D.C.)
- Shelton J. Fabre (Louisville)

===== (retired) =====
- Edward K. Braxton (Belleville)
- Gordon D. Bennett, SJ (Mandeville)
- Curtis J. Guillory, SVD (Beaumont)
- Martin D. Holley (Memphis)
- James P. Lyke (Atlanta)
- John H. Ricard, SSJ (Pensacola-Tallahassee)
- J. Terry Steib, SVD (Memphis)

==== Auxiliaries ====
===== (active) =====
- Roy E. Campbell (Washington, D.C.)
- Ferdinand Cheri III, OFM (New Orleans)
- Joseph N. Perry (Chicago)

=== Activists ===
- Homer Plessy
- Daniel Rudd
- Thomas Wyatt Turner
- Mary Louise Smith
- A. P. Tureaud
- James Chaney
- Diane Nash
- Sr Mary Antona Ebo, FSM
- Fr George Clements

=== Artists ===
- Amanda Gorman
- Billie Holiday
- Claude McKay
- Fr Clarence Rivers
- Jelly Roll Morton
- Mary Lou Williams
- Toni Morrison
- The Notorious B.I.G.
- Aaron Neville
- Fr William Norvel
- Vanessa Williams
- Lil Wayne
- Keke Palmer
- Aaliyah
- Buckwheat Zydeco
- Ed Dwight
- Omari Hardwick

=== Educators ===
- Fr Patrick Healy, SJ
- Servant of God Mary Lange, OSP
- Venerable Henriette Delille, SSF
- Mother Mathilda Beasley, OSF
- Anne Marie Becraft
- Mother Mary Theodore Williams, FHM
- Servant of God Thea Bowman, FSPA
- Fr Cyprian Davis, OSB
- Sr Francesca Thompson, OSF
- Norman Francis
- Sr Jamie Phelps, OP
- M. Shawn Copeland
- Diana L. Hayes
- C. Vanessa White
- Bryan Massingale

=== Firsts ===
- Jean Baptiste Point du Sable
- William Augustine Williams
- Venerable Augustus Tolton
- Bishop Joseph L. Howze
- Archbishop Eugene Marino, SSJ
- Cardinal Wilton Gregory
- Fr Clarence Rivers
- Mary Fields

=== Jurists ===
- Clarence Thomas
- J. Michelle Childs

=== Philanthropists ===
- Venerable Pierre Toussaint
- Juliette Toussaint
- Julia Greeley
- Mary Ellen Pleasant

=== Athletes and coaches ===
- Kobe Bryant
- Dominique Dawes
- Simone Biles
- Herm Edwards
- Al Attles
- Victor Oladipo
- Isiah Thomas
- Kerry Kittles
- Kendrick Perkins
- John Thompson, Jr.
- Trayce Thompson
- Klay Thompson
- Frank Clarke (NFL)
- Byron Scott
- Joe Mazzulla
- Matisse Thybulle
- Derek Jeter
- Lenny Wilkens
- Hank Aaron

=== Politicians ===
- Muriel Bowser
- Donna Brazile
- Catherine Fleming Bruce
- LaToya Cantrell
- David Clarke (sheriff)
- William Lacy Clay Jr.
- William Lacy Clay Sr.
- Don Cravins, Jr.
- Amanda Edwards
- Jay Jones (politician)
- Alan Keyes
- David Paterson
- Michael Steele
- Ernest Morial

=== Media figures ===
- Chauncey Bailey
- David L. Gray
- Bryant Gumbel
- Greg Gumbel
- Cathy Hughes
- Tina Knowles
- Gloria Purvis
- Daniel Rudd
- James Earl Jones

== Pilgrimage sites ==
- Our Mother of Africa Chapel (located in the Basilica of the National Shrine of the Immaculate Conception)
- St. Martin de Porres National Shrine and Institute (Memphis, Tennessee)
- Grave of Venerable Augustus Tolton (St Peter Catholic Cemetery in Quincy, Illinois)
- Grave of Servant of God Julia Greeley (at the Cathedral Basilica of the Immaculate Conception in Denver)
- Tomb of Venerable Pierre Toussaint (in the crypt of St. Patrick's Cathedral in New York City)
- Venerable Henriette DeLille Prayer Chapel (inside St. Louis Cathedral in New Orleans)
- Former National Shrine of Saint Katharine Drexel (Now a chapel at the former St. Elizabeth's Convent)
- National Shrine of Saint Katharine Drexel (Now at the Cathedral Basilica of Saints Peter and Paul in Philadelphia)
- Grave of Daniel Rudd (St Joseph Cemetery in Bardstown, Kentucky)

== Ecumenism ==
There is a longstanding tradition of cooperation and coordination between Black Catholic and other black Christian traditions, at a variety of levels—especially during and since the Civil Rights and Black Power movements, which brought Black Catholic figures of note in direct contact and collaboration with the non-Catholic black leaders of said movements. Black Catholics of all stripes have, as members of the larger black community, participated in unifying moments of solidarity for the sake of black social uplift.

The Rev. Jesse Jackson has featured heavily in these interactions, and both he and Nation of Islam leader Louis Farrakhan have collaborated with Chicago's Black Catholics on a number of occasions—quite controversially in the case of Farrakhan.

== In popular media ==
=== Film ===
- Sister Act, a 1992 movie starring Whoopi Goldberg as a pseudo-nun, was inspired in part by Servant of God Thea Bowman—who was slated to be played by Goldberg in a biopic that never materialized. Sister Act would later become a franchise, with a sequel (1993), Broadway musical (2006), and third film in production as of 2022.
- Passing Glory, a movie based on the true story of St. Augustine High School's basketball team during desegregation, was released in 1999.
- The Courage to Love, a TV movie on the life of Venerable Mother Henriette Delille (played by Vanessa Williams) was released in the year 2000.
- A documentary on the Josephites, Enduring Faith, was released in 2000 as well. It was nominated for an Emmy.
- A live-action movie on Venerable Fr. Augustus Tolton, Across, was released in 2019.
- A documentary on Andre Cailloux was released in 2020, Cailloux – One Man's Fight for Freedom During the Civil War.
- A documentary on the six popularly venerated African Americans, titled A Place at the Table: African-Americans on the Path to Sainthood, was crowdfunded with over $18,000 in 2021. It was released in February 2022.
- A documentary on Thea Bowman was released in October 2022.

=== Theater ===
- Bowman was portrayed in a musical by her friend Mary Queen Donnelly, Thea's Turn, released in 2009.
  - Bowman was again portrayed on stage in a play by Nathan Yungberg, Thea, in 2019.
- A play concerning the life of Augustus Tolton, Tolton: From Slave to Priest, premiered in 2019.

== See also ==
- List of figures and institutions in Black Catholicism
- Black Catholic Movement
- Catholic Church and slavery in the United States
- Catholic Negro American Missions Board
- Healy family
- The Josephites
- Knights of Peter Claver
- National Black Catholic Congress
- Xavier University of Louisiana
