= Black church =

Predominantly African-American Christian congregations in the US

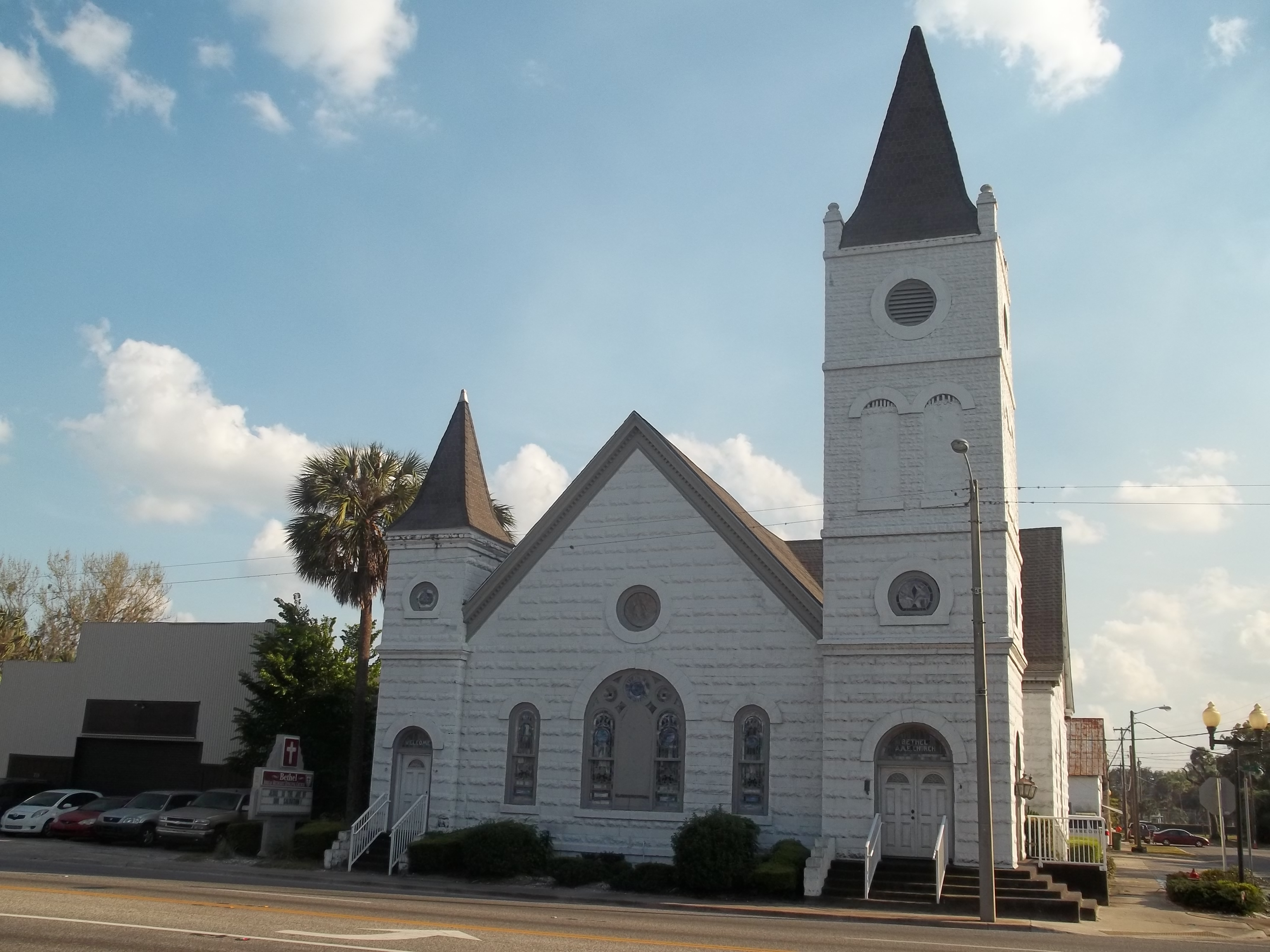
Bethel AME Church in Palatka, Florida

The Black church (sometimes termed Black Christianity or African American Christianity) is the faith and body of Christian denominations and congregations in the United States that predominantly minister to, and are led by, African Americans, as well as these churches' collective traditions and members.

Black churches primarily arose in the 19th century, during a time when race-based slavery and racial segregation were both commonly practiced in the United States. Black people generally searched for an area where they could independently express their faith, find leadership, and escape from inferior treatment in white-dominated churches.

Throughout many African American houses, churches reflect a deep cultural emphasis on community and shared spiritual experience providing an important cultural and historical significance that the African American community places on the act of gathering and the people themselves, rather than the location.

The number of Black churches in the United States is substantial. According to the Pew Research Center in 2005, there were approximately 25,000 Black churches across the country, encompassing a wide range of denominations and independent congregations.

A majority of African American congregations are affiliated with Protestant denominations, such as the African Methodist Episcopal Church (AME), the Church of God in Christ (COGIC), or the National Baptist Convention and related churches, some of them are affiliated with predominantly white Protestant denominations such as the United Church of Christ (which developed from the Congregational Church of New England), integrated denominations such as the Church of God, others are independent congregations. There are also Black Catholic churches.

In many major cities, Black and predominantly white churches often exist near each other; however, they remain segregated by race, a division which was shaped by deep historical, cultural, and social factors, including racism. During the eras of slavery and segregation, African Americans were largely excluded from white churches, which often upheld racial hierarchies and discrimination. This exclusion led to the creation of Black churches, which became vital spaces for community support, activism, and spiritual freedom.

Even after formal segregation ended, white churches frequently resisted integration, preferring to maintain homogenous congregations.

== Background ==
Most of the first Black congregations and churches which were formed before 1800 were founded by freedmen—for example, in Philadelphia, Pennsylvania; Springfield Baptist Church (Augusta, Georgia); Petersburg, Virginia; and Savannah, Georgia. The oldest black Baptist church in Kentucky, and third oldest Black Baptist church in the United States, the First African Baptist Church, was founded about 1790 by the slave Peter Durrett. The oldest Black Catholic church, St. Augustine in New Orleans, was founded by freedmen in 1841. However, Black religious orders such as the Oblate Sisters of Providence in Baltimore have existed since the 1820s.

After the American Civil War, many white Protestant ministers moved to the South to establish churches where both Black and white congregants could worship together. However, these efforts were often met with resistance, particularly from white Southerners who opposed racial integration. Despite these initial efforts toward inclusive worship, most integrated churches did not survive long due to racial tensions, societal segregation, and differing cultural and religious practices. Over time, the Black church emerged as a vital and independent institution for African Americans, offering not only spiritual sustenance but also a space for community organization and social activism, distinct from the predominantly white congregations.

In Wesleyan-Holiness denominations such as the Church of God, the belief that "interracial worship was a sign of the true Church" was taught, with both white people and black people ministering regularly in Church of God congregations, which invited people of all races to worship there. In some parts of the country, such as New Orleans, Black and white Catholics had worshiped together for almost 150 years before the American Civil War—albeit without full equality and primarily under French and Spanish rule.

== History ==
=== Slavery ===
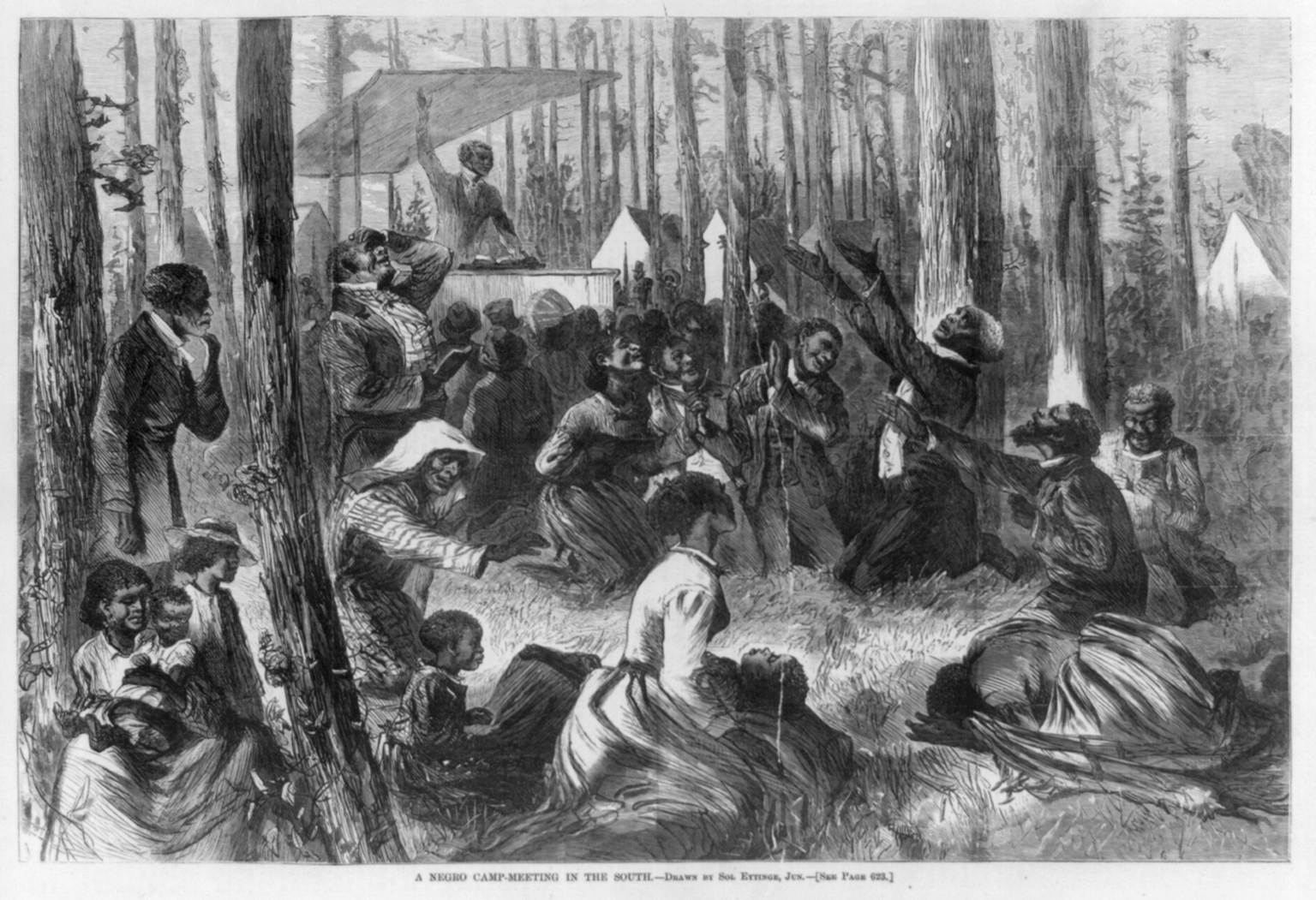
African American churches during slavery were held in secret locations called hush harbors.

While some slaves arrived with prior exposure to Christianity—particularly Catholicism from the Congo—or Islam, almost all first encountered Protestant Christianity in North America. Over time, African American Christianity became a distinctive form of Christian practice that combined evangelical teachings with African religious traditions, creating spiritual and communal spaces under conditions of slavery.

Early efforts at conversion were often led by Anglican missionaries and groups like the Society for the Propagation of the Gospel in Foreign Parts, with limited success. The First Great Awakening in the 18th century and the rise of Methodists and Baptists in the South brought evangelical preaching to slave communities, appealing to them through messages of spiritual equality and deliverance and offering some leadership roles although in some congregations black worshippers could face restrictions and segregation. Nevertheless, clandestine gatherings known as hush harbors and the formation of "invisible churches" allowed slaves to worship freely, and adapt Christian teachings to their own experiences, and incorporate African rhythms and traditions into worship.

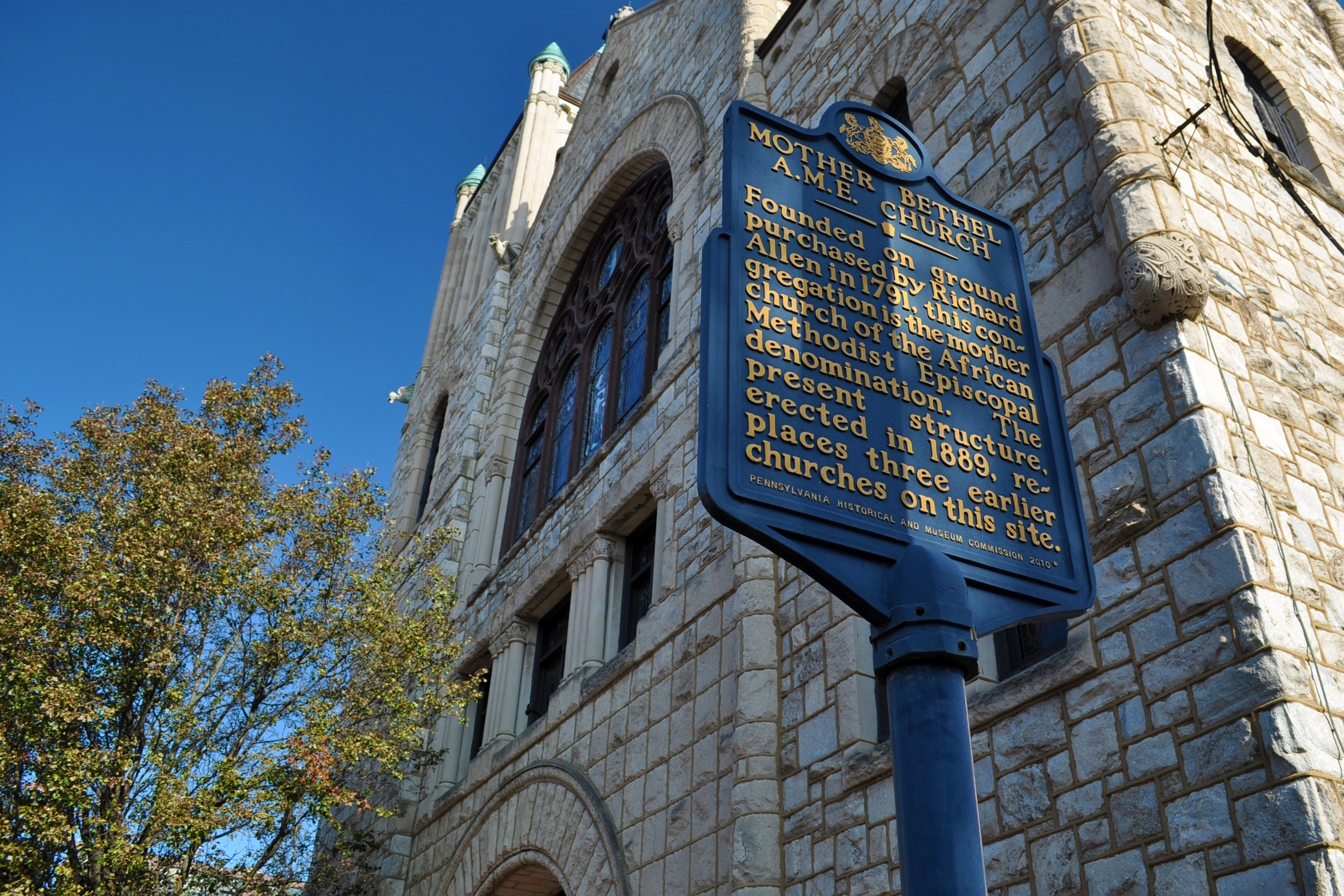
Mother Bethel A.M.E. Church, Philadelphia, Pennsylvania

By the early 19th century, African Americans established independent black churches and congregations, often led by freedmen, such as the African Methodist Episcopal Church founded by Richard Allen in 1816. These churches became centers of resistance and community support, including being active in the underground railroad.

Christianity also played a complex role in the ideology of slavery: slaveholders used biblical passages to justify enslavement and enforce obedience, while slave preachers and communities drew upon biblical narratives like the Exodus for inspiration in seeking freedom and equality.

=== Reconstruction ===
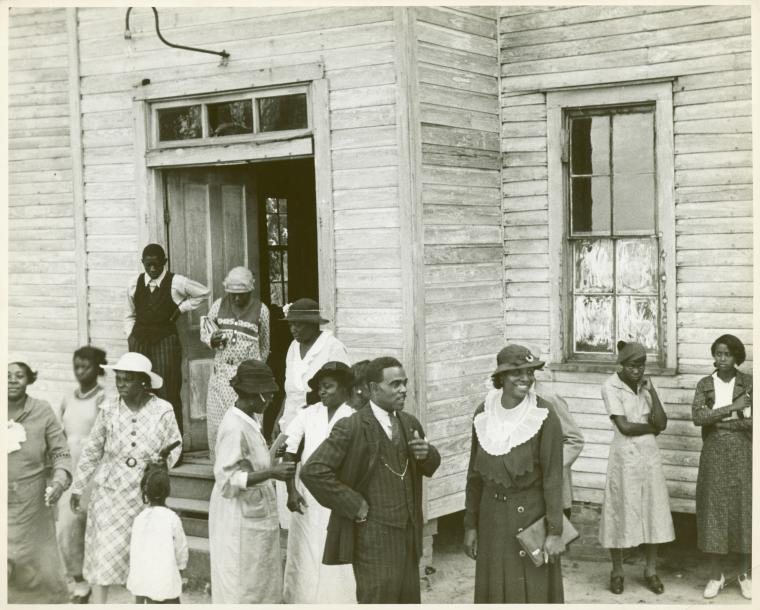
Outside of a black church in Little Rock, Arkansas, 1935

After the Emancipation Proclamation and the end of the Civil War, the Black church emerged as a central institution in African American communities during the Reconstruction era. Northern denominations and free Black churches sent missionaries to the South to minister to freed people, offering religious instruction as well as education in literacy and civic life. Leaders like Bishop Daniel Payne of the African Methodist Episcopal Church (AME) organized widespread efforts to establish schools and congregations across the South. Within a year of the war's end, the AME Church added 50,000 new members, eventually expanding to over 250,000 congregants from Florida to Texas by the close of Reconstruction.

This period also saw the rise of other independent Black denominations. The African Methodist Episcopal Zion Church gained tens of thousands of Southern members, and in 1870 Black ministers in Tennessee founded the Christian Methodist Episcopal Church (originally the Colored Methodist Episcopal Church), growing from 40,000 to over 67,000 members within three years. At the same time, Black Baptist churches flourished, culminating in the 1895 formation of the National Baptist Convention, USA, Inc., which unified three national African American conventions and became one of the largest Black religious organizations in the country. Some smaller groups, like the Church of God (Anderson, Indiana), emphasized interracial worship as a sign of spiritual unity, though they often faced hostility for their stance.

The Black church quickly became the cornerstone of African American public life, fostering leadership, mutual aid societies, and schools while providing a space for autonomy beyond white oversight. Churches served as hubs for political organizing and community building, reflecting the strength of "invisible churches" from the slavery era. Middle-class Black women, denied ordination, played vital roles through missionary societies that promoted education, social welfare, and racial uplift. These developments during Reconstruction cemented the Black church's role as a cultural, spiritual, and political anchor for African Americans in the post-emancipation United States.

=== Twentieth century ===
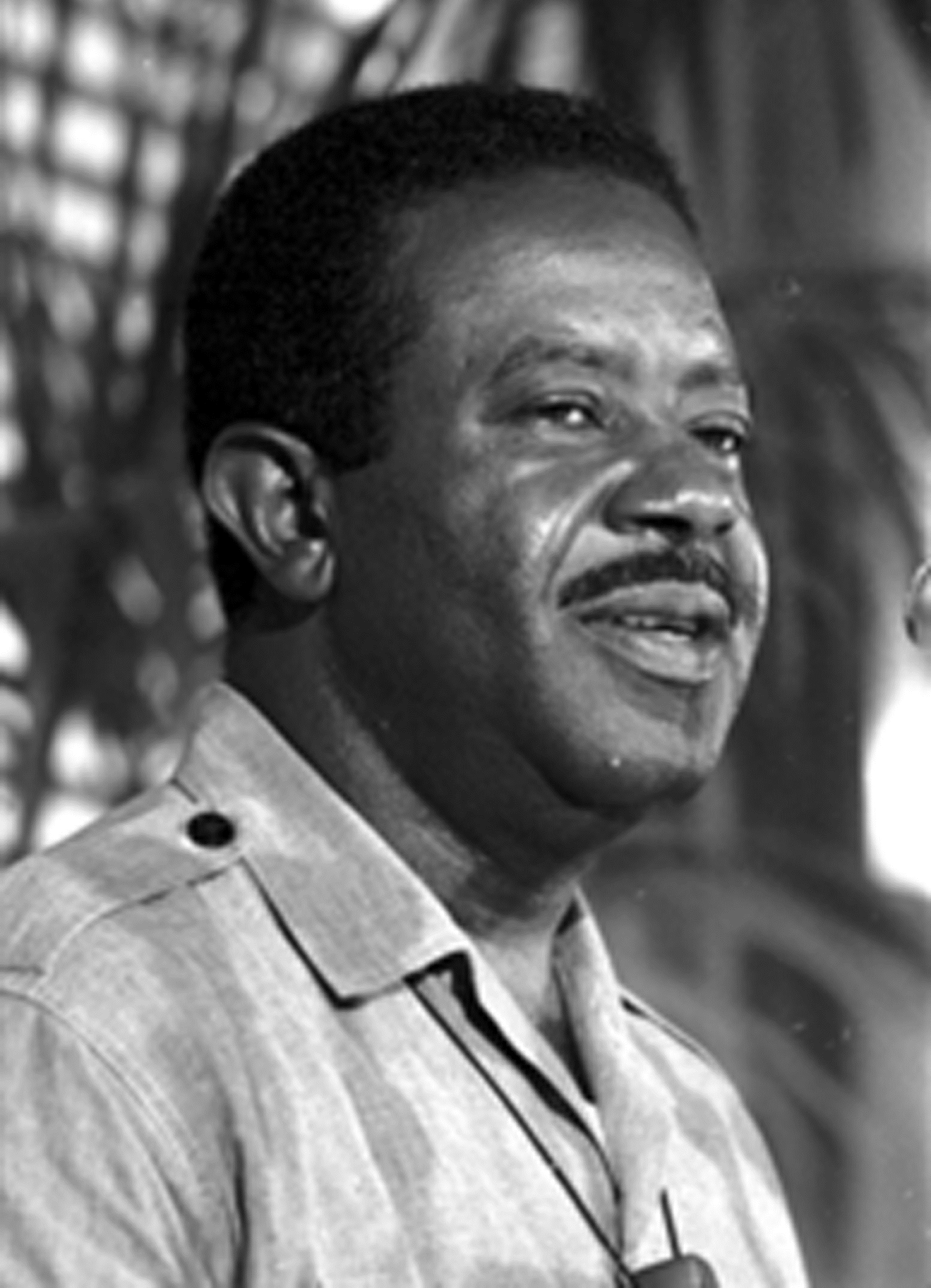
Ralph David Abernathy was a Baptist minister involved in the American Civil Rights Movement.

Black churches held a leadership role in the American civil rights movement. Their history as centers of strength for the black community made them natural leaders in this moral struggle. In addition they had often served as links between the black and white worlds. Notable minister-activists of the 1950s and 1960s included Martin Luther King Jr., Ralph David Abernathy, Bernard Lee, Fred Shuttlesworth, Wyatt Tee Walker, C. T. Vivian, and Fr. Ted Hesburgh, who would later be recruited by President Johnson to help craft the legislation that would later become the 1964 Civil Rights Act. During this movement, many African American Baptists split over using black churches as political centers alongside spiritual centers; this led to the formation of the Progressive National Baptist Convention.

After the assassination of Dr. King in 1968, by James Earl Ray, African American Catholics began organizing en masse, beginning with the clergy that April. A Black Catholic revolution soon broke out, fostering the integration of the traditions of the larger (Protestant) Black church into Black Catholic parishes. Soon there were organizations formed for Black religious sisters (1968), permanent deacons, seminarians, and a brand-new National Black Catholic Congress organization in 1987, reviving the late 19th-century iteration of the same. This era saw a massive increase in Black priests, and the first crop of Black bishops and archbishops.

== Black theology ==
One formalization of theology based on themes of black liberation is the black theology movement. Its origins can be traced to July 31, 1966, when an ad hoc group of 51 black pastors, calling themselves the National Committee of Negro Churchmen (NCNC), bought a full-page ad in The New York Times to publish their "Black Power Statement" which proposed a more aggressive approach to combating racism using the Bible for inspiration.

Black liberation theology was first systematized by James Cone and Dwight Hopkins. They are considered the leading theologians of this system of belief, although now there are many scholars who have contributed a great deal to the field. In 1969, Cone published the seminal work that laid the basis for black liberation theology, Black Theology and Black Power. In the book, Cone asserted that not only was black power not alien to the Gospel, it was, in fact, the Gospel message for all of 20th century America.

In 2008, approximately one quarter of African-American churches followed a liberation theology. The theology was thrust into the national spotlight after a controversy arose related to preaching by Rev. Jeremiah Wright, former pastor to then-Senator Barack Obama at Trinity United Church of Christ, Chicago. Wright had built Trinity into a successful megachurch following the theology developed by Cone, who has said that he would "point to [Trinity] first" as an example of a church's embodying his message.

Scholars have seen parallels between the Black church and the 21st century Black Girl Magic movement, with social media interactions involving the Black Girl Magic hashtag seen as a modern extension of "[t]he Black church traditions of testimony, exhortation, improvisation, call and response, and song," which Black women can use to form a "cyber congregation."

=== Womanist theology ===
From the Black theology movement also came a more feminine form, in reaction to both the male-dominated nature of the field and the White-dominated nature of Feminist theology. Major figures in this reaction included Afro-Latino thinkers as well as Black women. Black Catholic womanists also played a major role, including Sr Jamie Phelps, OP, M. Shawn Copeland, and Diana L. Hayes.

== Politics and social issues ==
The black church continues to be a source of support for members of the African American community, like encouragement to obtain immunizations. When compared to American churches as a whole, predominantly African American churches tend to focus more on social issues such as poverty, gang violence, drug use, prison ministries and racism. A study in 1996 found that African American Christians were more likely to have heard about health care reform from their pastors than were white Christians. As of 2024, the National Black Church initiative had 27.7 million members in the United States.

Most surveys indicate that while black people tend to vote Democratic in elections, members of traditionally African American churches are generally more socially conservative than white Protestants as a whole. Same-sex marriage and other LGBT issues have been among the leading causes for activism in some black churches; though a majority of black Protestants remained opposed to same-sex marriage as of 2015, support grew to a majority of both black Protestant and black Catholic respondents in later surveys. Nevertheless, some denominations have been discussing this issue. For example, the African Methodist Episcopal Church prohibits its ministers from officiating same-sex weddings, but it does not have a clear policy on ordination.

Some African American clergy have not accepted same-sex marriage. A group known as the Coalition of African American Pastors (CAAP), maintains their opposition to gay marriage. The CAAP president, Reverend William Owens Sr., asserts that the marriage equality act will cause corruption within the United States. The organization insists that a real union is between a man and a woman. They also believe that the law prohibiting gay marriage should have been upheld. Other African American religious leaders that echoed Owens' position were Bishop Janice Hollis, presiding prelate for Covenant International Fellowship of Churches in Philadelphia; Bishop Charles G. Nauden of Holyway Church of God in Christ of Southern California; and the Reverend Dean Nelson, vice chairman of the Frederick Douglass Foundation. The CAAP members agree that the Supreme Court had no right to overturn the constitutional ruling.

== As neighborhood institutions ==
Although black urban neighborhoods in cities that have deindustrialized may have suffered from civic disinvestment, with lower quality schools, less effective policing and fire protection, there are institutions that help to improve the physical and social capital of black neighborhoods. In black neighborhoods the churches may be important sources of social cohesion. For some African Americans the kind of spirituality learned through these churches works as a protective factor against the corrosive forces of poverty and racism.

Churches may also do work to improve the physical infrastructure of the neighborhood. Churches in Harlem have undertaken real estate ventures and renovated burnt-out and abandoned brownstones to create new housing for residents. Churches have fought for the right to operate their own schools in place of the often inadequate public schools found in many black neighborhoods.

== Traditions ==
Like many Christians, African American Christians sometimes participate in or attend a Christmas play. Black Nativity by Langston Hughes is a re-telling of the classic Nativity story with gospel music. Productions can be found at black theaters and churches all over the country. The Three Wise Men are typically played by prominent members of the black community.

The watchnight service held on New Year's Eve in many Christian denominations, especially those of the Methodist and Moravian traditions, is widely attended by African American Christians.

== Denominations ==
Throughout U.S. history, religious preferences and racial segregation have fostered development of separate black church denominations, as well as black churches within white denominations.

=== Methodism (inclusive of the holiness movement) ===
African Americans were drawn to Methodism due to the father of Methodism, John Wesley's "opposition to the whole system of slavery, his commitment to Jesus Christ, and the evangelical appeal to the suffering and the oppressed."

==== African Methodist Episcopal Church ====
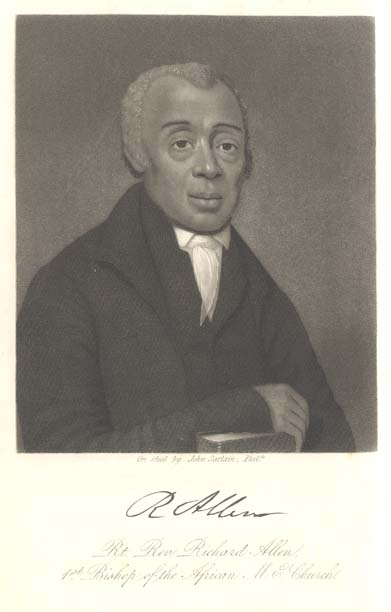
Richard Allen

The first of these churches was the African Methodist Episcopal Church. In the late 18th century, former slave Richard Allen, a Methodist preacher, was an influential deacon and elder at the integrated and affluent St. George's Methodist Church in Philadelphia. The charismatic Allen had attracted numerous new black members to St. George's. White members had become so uncomfortable that they relegated black worshipers to a segregated gallery. After white members of St. George's started to treat his people as second-class citizens, in 1787 Allen, Absalom Jones, also a preacher; and other black members left St. George's.

They first established the non-denominational Free African Society, which acted as a mutual aid society. Religious differences caused Jones to take numerous followers to create an Episcopal congregation. They established the African Episcopal Church of St. Thomas, which opened its doors in 1794. Absalom Jones was later ordained by the bishop of the Philadelphia diocese as the first African-American priest in the Episcopal Church.

Allen continued for some years within the Methodist denomination but organized a black congregation. By 1794 he and his followers opened the doors of the Mother Bethel AME Church.

Over time, Allen and others sought more independence from white supervision within the Methodist Church. In 1816 Allen gathered four other black congregations together in the mid-Atlantic region to establish the African Methodist Episcopal Church as an independent denomination, the first fully independent black denomination. The ministers consecrated Allen as their first bishop.

==== African Methodist Episcopal Zion Church ====
The African Methodist Episcopal Zion or AME Zion Church, like the AME Church, is an offshoot of the Methodist Episcopal Church. Black members of the John Street Methodist Church of New York City left to form their own church after several acts of overt discrimination by white members. In 1796, Black Methodists asked the permission of the bishop of the Methodist Episcopal Church to meet independently, though still to be part of that church and led by white preachers. This AME Church group built Zion chapel in 1800 and became incorporated in 1801, still subordinate to the Methodist Episcopal Church.

In 1820, AME Zion Church members began further separation from the Methodist Episcopal Church. By seeking to install black preachers and elders, they created a debate over whether black people could be ministers. This debate ended in 1822 with the ordination of Abraham Thompson, Leven Smith, and James Varick, the first superintendent (bishop) of the AME Zion Church. After the American Civil War, the denomination sent missionaries to the South and attracted thousands of new members, who shaped the church.

==== Other Methodist-Holiness connexions ====
- African Union First Colored Methodist Protestant Church and Connection
- Christian Methodist Episcopal Church
- Church of Christ (Holiness) U.S.A.
- Lumber River Conference of the Holiness Methodist Church

=== Baptists ===
==== National Baptist Convention, USA ====
The National Baptist Convention of the United States of America was first organized in 1880 as the Foreign Mission Baptist Convention in Montgomery, Alabama. Its founders, including Elias Camp Morris, stressed the preaching of the gospel as an answer to the shortcomings of a segregated church. In 1895, Morris moved to Atlanta, Georgia, and founded the National Baptist Convention, USA, Inc., as a merger of the Foreign Mission Convention, the American National Baptist Convention, and the Baptist National Education Convention.

==== Other Baptist denominations ====
- Full Gospel Baptist Church Fellowship
- Lott Carey Foreign Mission Convention
- National Baptist Convention of America International, Inc.
- National Missionary Baptist Convention of America
- Progressive National Baptist Convention

=== Pentecostalism ===
==== Church of God in Christ ====
In 1907, Charles Harrison Mason formed the Church of God in Christ after his Baptist church and the Mississippi Convention of the NBC USA expelled him. Mason was a member of the Holiness movement of the late 19th century. In 1906, he attended the Azusa Street Revival in Los Angeles. Upon his return to Tennessee, he began teaching the Holiness Pentecostal message. However, Charles Price Jones and J. A. Jeter of the Wesleyan Holiness movement disagreed with Mason's teachings on the Baptism of the Holy Spirit.

Jones changed the name of his COGIC church to the Church of Christ (Holiness) USA in 1915.

At a conference in Memphis, Tennessee, Mason reorganized the Church of God in Christ as a Holiness Pentecostal body. The headquarters of COGIC is Mason Temple in Memphis, Tennessee. It is the site of Martin Luther King's final sermon, "I've Been to the Mountaintop", delivered the day before he was assassinated.

==== Other Pentecostal denominations ====
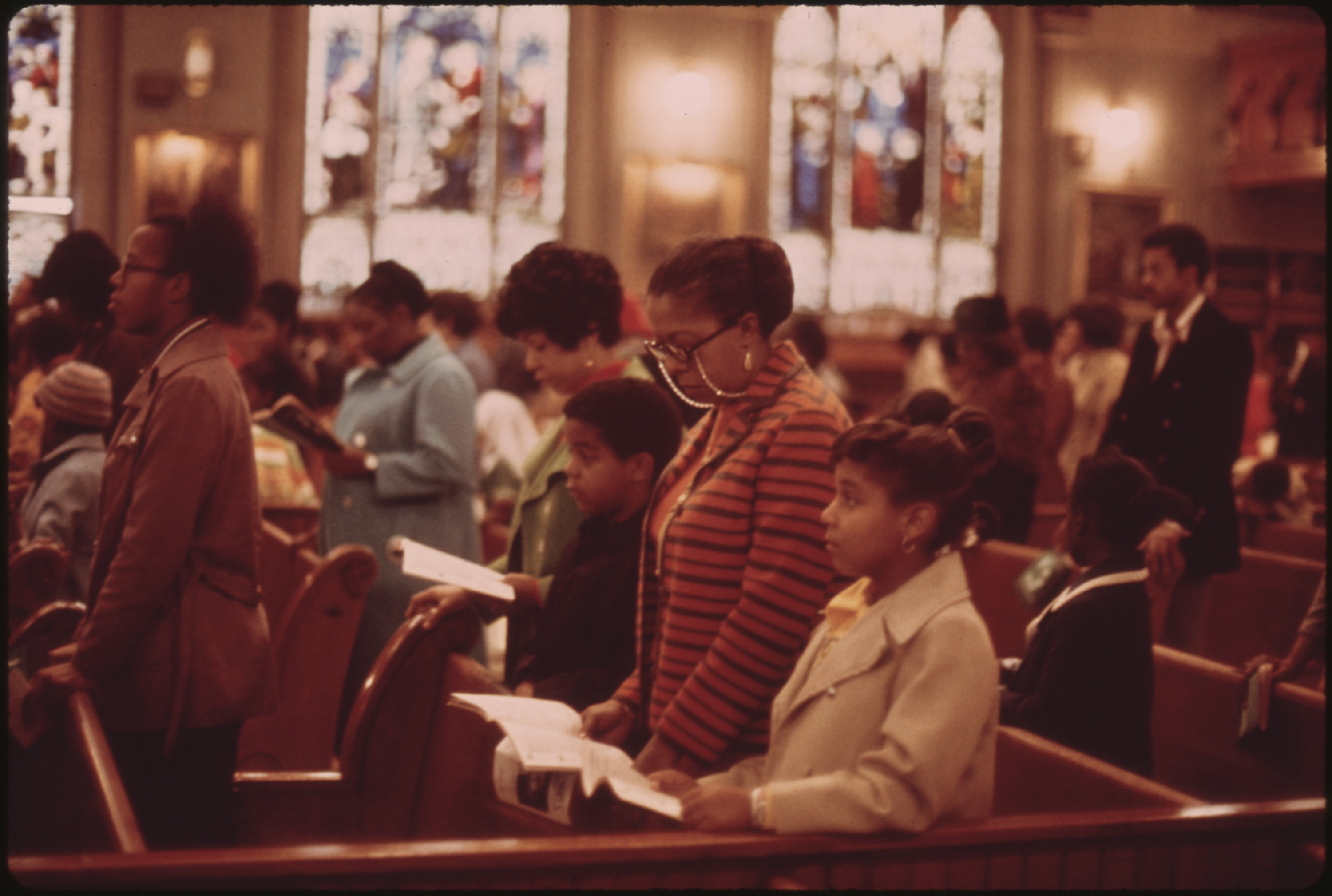
Worshippers at Holy Angels Catholic Church on the South Side of Chicago, Illinois, by John H. White, 1973

- United Holy Church of America
- Apostolic Faith Mission
- Apostolic Faith Mission Church of God
- Church of Our Lord Jesus Christ of the Apostolic Faith
- Fire Baptized Holiness Church of God of the Americas
- Mount Sinai Holy Church of America
- Pentecostal Assemblies of the World
- United House of Prayer for All People
- United Pentecostal Council of the Assemblies of God, Incorporated

=== Black Catholicism ===
Birthed from pre-U.S. communities in New Orleans, Baltimore, and Florida, among others, the presence of African American Catholics in the United States territories constitute some of the earliest Black communities on the entire continent. Beginning in the early 19th century, Black Catholic religious sisters began forming congregations to serve their communities, beginning with Mary Elizabeth Lange and Henriette DeLille, who founded the Oblate Sisters of Providence and Sisters of the Holy Family, respectively. They were soon followed by the emergence of openly Black priests, the first being Fr Augustus Tolton in 1886.

The Society of St Joseph of the Sacred Heart (aka the Josephites), a group of priests tasked with serving African-Americans specifically, were formed in 1893 and began ordaining Black men immediately—though in small numbers. They staffed and formed Black parishes throughout the country, and today continue to serve in the same way (as do the two aforementioned sisterhoods, as well as the Franciscan Handmaids of the Most Pure Heart of Mary).

After the Civil Rights Movement, various new Black Catholic organizations were founded for Black priests, sisters, deacons, and seminarians, and the National Black Catholic Congress arrived in 1987. African-American Catholic priests greatly increased in number and African-American bishops began being appointed, including archbishops.

Wilton Gregory, the first African American cardinal, was named in 2020.

== See also ==
- African diaspora religions
- Atheism in the African diaspora
- Black sermonic tradition
- Black theology
- Louisiana Black church fires
- Our Lady of Ferguson
- Our Mother of Africa Chapel
- Traditional Black gospel

General:

- Racial segregation of churches in the United States
- Religion in Black America
- Religious discrimination in the United States
