= Black Catholic Theological Symposium =

Catholic organization (e. 1978)

- Formation: 1978
- Type: Theological society
- Purpose: Promotion of Black Catholic theology
- Region served: United States
- Convener: Dr. Kimberly Lymore
- Associate Convener: Dr. timone davis
- Secretary: Dr. Nathaniel Samuel
- Treasurer: Dr. Kim Harris
- Website: blackcatholictheologicalsymposium.org

The Black Catholic Theological Symposium is a United States–based Catholic organization founded in 1978 to promote theological education and research concerning Black Catholics.

== History ==
In 1978, the first meeting of the Black Catholic Theological Symposium, organized by Thaddeus Posey, O.F.M. and sponsored by the National Black Catholic Clergy Caucus, was held in Baltimore, Maryland. It worked on defining black theology and clarifying its relationship with the black consciousness movement and related understandings of violence and separatism. Including theologians such as Thea Bowman, M. Shawn Copeland, Jamie T. Phelps, and Cyprian Davis, its proceedings were published as Theology: A Portrait in Black.

The second meeting of the Symposium was held in 1979 on the theme of "Nguba Saba". It would not hold another meeting until 1991, when convened by Sr Jamie T. Phelps, O.P., but has held meetings annually ever since.

== Conveners ==
1. Fr Thaddeus Posey, OFM
2. Sr Jamie T. Phelps, OP
3. Dr. M. Shawn Copeland
4. Dr. Kimberly Flint Hamilton
5. Fr Bryan Massingale
6. Dr. C. Vanessa White
7. Dr. Kathleen Dorsey Bellow
8. Fr Maurice J. Nutt, CSsR
9. Dr. Kimberly Lymore

== See also ==
- Black Catholicism
- Black Catholic Movement
- Black theology
