= Claver College =

Black Catholic college in Oklahoma, US

Claver College was a Black Catholic institution of higher education in Guthrie, Oklahoma, founded in 1933 by the Benedictine Sisters of St. Joseph's Monastery in Tulsa.

== History ==
Claver College was founded in 1933 by Sr Joseph O'Connor, a Benedictine religious sister from St. Joseph's Monastery in Tulsa, to serve the African American population of Guthrie, Oklahoma. The college was supported with funding from Katharine Drexel (who had founded Xavier University of Louisiana, the nation's only Catholic HBCU, in 1925). The college was named after Peter Claver, a Jesuit missionary and the patron saint of African-American ministry.

The college, a night school, operated out of a building that also hosted a grocery store. It ceased operations in 1944, and its former place of operation, the floodplain neighborhood of "Little Africa", was later destroyed. It has since experienced sustained restoration efforts.
