= Lawrence E. Lucas =

American Catholic priest (1933–2020)

The Reverend Lawrence E. Lucas
- Born: 1933; Harlem New York City, New York
- Died: 18 April 2020 (aged 86–87)
- Occupations: Roman Catholic Priest, human rights and civil rights activist

Ecclesiastical career
- Religion: Christianity
- Church: Roman Catholic Church
- Ordained: 1959
- Congregations: Chapel of the Resurrection, New York City; St. Charles Borromeo Church, New York City

Lawrence E. Lucas (1933 – 18 April 2020) was an American Catholic priest, activist, educator, and author. He was the author of Black Priest White Church: Catholics and Racism, and In the 1970s became the first African-American pastor of Resurrection Catholic Church in Harlem, New York City.

Lucas was also a co-founding member of the December 12th Movement (D12), a Black liberation theologian and an advocate for prison reform. He was a founding member of the National Black Catholic Clergy Caucus.

== Early life ==
Lucas was born at Harlem Hospital in 1933 and raised in Harlem. His early education was in Harlem at P.S. 39, All Saints School at All Saints Church (Manhattan), and St. Mark's. He is quoted as saying that his activism came from his mother, who fought against greedy landlords in their Harlem tenement.

== Career ==
=== Education ===
Lucas studied for the priesthood at St. Joseph's Seminary, before being ordained in 1959 by Cardinal Francis Spellman at St. Peter's Church in New York City.

=== Priesthood ===
At Resurrection parish in Manhattan, he served as parochial vicar from 1961 to 1964, and from 1964 to 1966 was parochial vicar at St. Charles Borromeo in Harlem. He then did postgraduate work at the University of Indianapolis from 1966 to 1968, and was also a communications consultant for the Archdiocese of New York from 1968 to 1969.

He co-founded the National Black Catholic Clergy Caucus in 1968, remaining active in the resulting Black Catholic Movement and advocating for Black priests to have decision-making power within Catholic dioceses and in the Black community.

==== Pastorate ====
In 1969, his advocacy paid off and he returned to Resurrection to become the first African-American pastor of the parish, holding the role for 24 years, from 1969 to 1992.

During his pastorate, in 1983, Lucas participated in "Police Misconduct: Hearings Before the Subcommittee on Criminal Justice of the Committee on the Judiciary," in the House of Representatives in Washington, D.C.

In 1987, Lucas along with Viola Plummer, Elombe Brath, Coltrane Chimurenga founded the December 12th Movement which was the outgrowth of the December 12 Coalition responding to violent attacks and murder of Black people in New York state.

Lucas was a character witness for Yusef Salaam during the Central Park trial in New York City, and was one of the community organizers for the 1990 Church Avenue boycott in Brooklyn.

==== Chaplaincy ====
He served as chaplain at North General Hospital in East Harlem from 1992 to 1994, at Rikers Island prison from 1994 to 2008, and at the New York City Department of Correction from 2008 to 2009.

Lucas also served on WBAI's Local Station Board.

==== Retirement ====
In 2010, Lucas retired as senior priest of Our Lady of Lourdes in New York City, after being in the role for a year.

=== Other work ===
Lucas was for many years a host on the Manhattan Neighborhood Network television show Community Cop in New York City.

Lucas was also President of Community Board 10 in Harlem for fifteen years, and was the first vice president of Community School Board No. 5.

=== Death ===
Lucas died in 2020.
