= Cyprian Davis =

African-American Catholic monk, priest, and historian

The Reverend Doctor Cyprian Davis O.S.B.
- Born: Clarence John Davis; September 9, 1930; Washington, D.C.
- Died: May 18, 2015 (aged 84); Jasper, IN
- Occupation: Church historian

Academic background
- Education: Catholic University of Louvain, Belgium

Academic work
- School or tradition: Catholic Church history
- Institutions: St. Meinrad Archabbey

Cyprian Davis, OSB (born Clarence John Davis; September 9, 1930 – May 18, 2015) was an African-American Benedictine monk, priest, and historian at Saint Meinrad Archabbey in Indiana. He is known for his work on the history of Black Catholicism.

== Biography ==
Davis was born in Washington, D.C., on September 9, 1930. He converted to Catholicism in his teenage years and became interested in joining the priesthood as well as becoming a monk. Though many monastic communities (and most Catholic religious institutes) did not accept African Americans at the time, after high school Davis joined the seminary of St. Meinrad Archabbey (1949–1956). He became a novice on July 31, 1950, took the monastic name Cyprian on August 1, 1951, and was ordained a priest on May 3, 1956. He was the first African American to join that monastic community.

Davis received a Licentiate of Sacred Theology from the Catholic University of America (1957), before going to the Catholic University of Louvain, Belgium to study Church history, obtaining his Doctoral en Sciences Historiques (D.Hist.Sci.) from Louvain, in 1963. While there, Davis focused his work on the Church during the Middle Ages to avoid American Church history and concerns of race and slavery. Upon his first return from Belgium in 1963, he taught church history at Saint Meinrad Seminary, and eventually became the school's first professor emeritus in 2012.

Having returned to the US in the midst of the civil rights movement, Davis attended the August 1963 March on Washington and heard Martin Luther King Jr. deliver his "I Have a Dream" speech. He would later march with Mary Antona Ebo and others in the Selma to Montgomery marches.

As a black Catholic professor, he began to be invited to speak in black parishes and was constantly asked about the place of African Americans in the Catholic church. He was involved in writing two pastoral letters on race, "Brothers and Sisters to Us" (1979) and "What We Have Seen and Heard" (1984), and later received a grant from the Lilly Endowment to the study the black Catholic church, resulting in the publication of his award-winning The History of Black Catholics in the United States (1990)

Davis died on May 18, 2015, in Memorial Hospital in Jasper, Indiana, at age 84.

== Works ==
- Davis, Cyprian (1989). Christ's image in Black: the Black Catholic community before the Civil War. University of Notre Dame. OCLC 22714523.
- Davis, Cyprian (1990). The history of Black Catholics in the United States. Crossroad. ISBN 9780824510107.
- Hayes, Diana L.; Davis, Cyprian (1998). Taking Down Our Harps: Black Catholics in the United States. Orbis Books. ISBN 9781570751745.
- Davis, Cyprian; Phelps, Jamie T. (2003). Stamped with the image of God: African Americans as God's image in Black. Orbis Books. ISBN 9781570755224.
- Davis, Cyprian (2004). Henriette Delille: Servant of Slaves, Witness to the Poor. Archives of the Archdiocese of New Orleans.
- Davis, Cyprian (2004). To Prefer Nothing to Christ: Saint Meinrad Archabbey, 1854-2004. Saint Meinrad Archabbey/Abbey Press. ISBN 9780870293832.
