= M. Shawn Copeland =

African American Catholic theologian

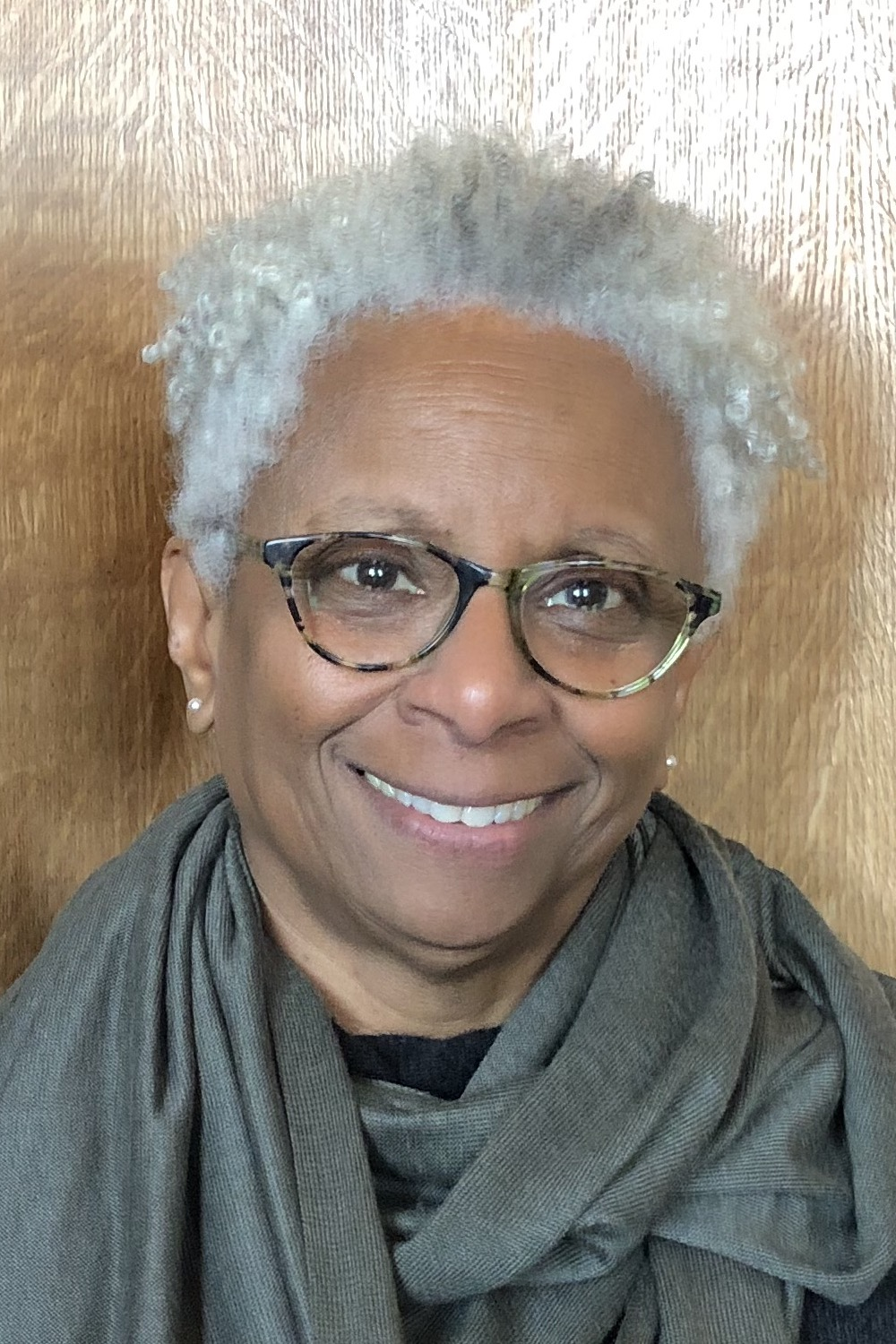
- Born: August 24, 1947 (age 79)
- Occupation: Theologian
- Title: Professor Emerita

Academic background
- Education: Madonna College; Boston College
- Influences: James Cone; Bernard Lonergan

Academic work
- Discipline: Systematic theology
- Sub-discipline: Theological anthropology; Political theology; Womanist theology; Black Catholic theology
- School or tradition: Catholic theology
- Institutions: Boston College; Xavier University of Louisiana; Yale Divinity School; Marquette University
- Influenced: Andrew L. Prevot Robert J. Rivera Michele Saracino

Mary Shawn Copeland (born August 24, 1947), known professionally as M. Shawn Copeland, is a retired American womanist and Black Catholic theologian, and a former religious sister. She is professor emerita of systematic theology at Boston College and is known for her work in theological anthropology, political theology, and African American Catholicism.

== Biography ==
An only child, Copeland grew up in Detroit, Michigan, where she attended parochial elementary and secondary schools. She received her B.A. in English in 1969 from Madonna College in Michigan before becoming a Felician religious sister and teaching in a high school. After she became involved in protests against the Archdiocese of Detroit's attempts to close Black Catholic schools, she felt pressure from within her order and transferred to the Adrian Dominican Sisters in 1971. After working for the National Black Sisters' Conference and then Theology in the Americas, she began a doctoral program at Boston College to study with Jesuit theologian Bernard Lonergan. She completed her PhD in systematic theology in 1991, with a dissertation titled "A Genetic Study of the Idea of the Human Good in the Thought of Bernard Lonergan," and she left religious life in 1994.

Copeland has held positions at Xavier University of Louisiana, Yale Divinity School, St. Norbert College, Harvard Divinity School, Marquette University, and Candler School of Theology at Emory University. She worked as an adjunct professor in the Department of Theology at Boston College for a number of years, and joined in 2003 as associate professor of Systematic Theology. She became a full professor at Boston College in 2013, retiring and becoming Professor Emerita of Systematic Theology in 2019.

From 2003 to 2004, Copeland served as the first African American president of the Catholic Theological Society of America (CTSA). From 2001 to 2005, Copeland was also the convenor of the Black Catholic Theological Symposium (BCTS).

In 2007, Copeland gave the Madeleva Lecture at St. Mary's College (Indiana).

In October 2019, she delivered the Cunningham Lectures in New College, University of Edinburgh, on the topic "Theology as Political: The Weight, the Yearning, the Urgency of Life." In 2020, she began a one-year term as the Alonzo L. McDonald Family Chair on the Life and Teachings of Jesus and Their Impact on Culture at Emory University. As part of her term, she delivered public lectures in fall 2020 and spring 2021.

== Scholarship ==
Copeland's work spans the fields of systematic theology, political theology, public theology, Christology, theological anthropology, and African American Catholicism. Her work centers the lived experiences of people experiencing oppression, violence, and injustice. Copeland has been active in struggles for justice. At the 2021 Black Catholic Theological Symposium at the University of Notre Dame, she delivered a lecture in which she argued, "Black Lives Matter is what theology looks like."

She delivered a plenary address entitled An Imperative to Act as part of the Plenary Panel The CTSA at 75: Looking Back, Around, and Forward at the CTSA gathering 2021.

== Honors ==
In 2018, Copeland became the first African American theologian honored with the prestigious John Courtney Murray Award, the Catholic Theological Society of America's highest honor. In the citation for this award, Copeland was described in the following way: "Our honoree is a prolific, profound and pioneering scholar whose work places suffering humanity at its center, particularly those suffering from the persistent racism, sexism and heterosexism pervasive in our church and society. For our honoree this experience of suffering leads to the cross of Jesus of Nazareth which is at the heart of her theology."

A festschrift was also produced that year in honor of Copeland, entitled Enfleshing Theology: Embodiment, Discipleship, and Politics in the Work of M. Shawn Copeland. Additionally, Copeland has received the Marianist Award, the Yves Congar Award, the Elizabeth Seton Award, and Villanova University's Civitas Dei Medal. Copeland has received six honorary degrees.

== Controversy ==
In 2017, a lecture of Copeland's at Madonna University was canceled after conservative Catholic media outlets (including Church Militant) published articles critiquing Copeland's stance on LGBT issues, which has at times been in conflict with official Church teachings. In her book Enfleshing Freedom, Copeland wrote: "On Easter, God made Jesus queer in His solidarity with us. In other words, Jesus ‘came out of the closet’ and became the ‘queer’ Christ."

== Books ==
- M. Shawn Copeland (2009). The Subversive Power of Love: The Vision of Henriette Delille. New York: Paulist Press. ISBN 978-0-8091-4489-1.
- M. Shawn Copeland (2010). Enfleshing Freedom: Body, Race, and Being. Minneapolis, MN: Fortress Press. ISBN 978-0-8006-6274-5.
- M. Shawn Copeland (2018). Knowing Christ Crucified: The Witness of African American Religious Experience. Maryknoll, NY: Orbis Books. ISBN 978-1-62698-298-7.
- M. Shawn Copeland (2023). Enfleshing Freedom: Body, Race, and Being (2 ed.). Minneapolis, MN: Fortress Press. ISBN 978-1506463254.
