= Black Catholic History Month =

Annual American Catholic observance

Black Catholic History Month is an annual declared month that highlights the contributions of Black (and especially African-American) Catholics to events in history and contemporary society. It is celebrated during November in the United States and elsewhere, coinciding with the feasts of All Saints' Day (November 1), All Souls' Day (2), St Martin de Porres (3); the birth of St Augustine (13); and the death of Zumbi of Palmares (20).

The commemoration began in 1990 at the behest of the National Black Catholic Clergy Caucus during their annual meeting held that year at Fordham University in New York City. They voted in favor of the proposal on July 24.
