= George Clements =

American Catholic priest (1932–2019)

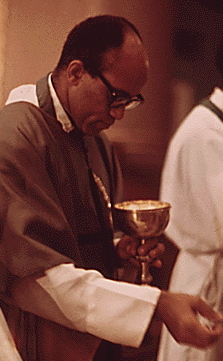
- Fr. George H. Clements giving Holy Communion, 1973. Photo by John H. White.
- Born: George Harold Clements; January 26, 1932; Chicago, Illinois, U.S.
- Died: November 25, 2019 (aged 87); Hammond, Indiana, U.S.
- Occupations: Roman Catholic priest, activist
- Years active: 1957–2019
- Children: 4 (adopted)

George Harold Clements (January 26, 1932 – November 25, 2019) was an African-American Catholic priest who in 1981 became the first Catholic priest in the Chicago area to adopt a child. He was also instrumental in the Black Catholic Movement, which sought to establish African-American culture in the liturgical and organizational life of the Catholic Church.

In June 1969, Clements became the second Black Catholic priest in Chicago, and was well known for his involvement in civil rights activities from that point onward. He was accused of sexual abuse in 2019, and was partially cleared that same year, shortly before his death. In April 2022, it was revealed that the Archdiocese of Chicago paid $100,000 for a claim settled posthumously against Clements concerning alleged abuse in the 1970s.

== Biography ==
=== Early life ===
George Clements was born George Harold Clements in Chicago on January 26, 1932, to Samuel George, a Chicago city auditor, and Aldonia (Peters) Clements. He attended Corpus Christi Elementary School in Chicago, and graduated from Chicago's Quigley Academy Seminary in 1945. He studied at St. Mary of the Lake Seminary, earning a Bachelor of Arts degree in Sacred Theology, and a Master of Arts degree in philosophy. Clements became an ordained priest of the Archdiocese of Chicago on May 3, 1957.

=== Timeline ===
- 1945: Became the first black graduate of Quigley Academy Seminary in Chicago, Illinois.
- May 3, 1957: Ordained a Roman Catholic priest in Chicago by Cardinal Samuel Stritch.
- 1960s: Marched with Reverend Martin Luther King Jr. in Alabama, Mississippi, and Chicago.
- 1969: Became priest of Holy Angels Church in Chicago, a position that he held until 1991.
- 1980: Originated the One Church-One Child program concept.
- 1981: Received approval from the Vatican to adopt the first of his four children, becoming the first Catholic priest in the Chicago area to do so.
- 1994: Started the One Church-One Addict program.
- 1999: Started the One Church-One Inmate program.
- May 4, 2007: Completed fiftieth year as a Roman Catholic priest.

=== Death ===
Clements suffered a stroke on October 12, 2019. He died on November 25, 2019, at a hospital in Hammond, Indiana, from a heart attack at the age of 87. His death was confirmed by his longtime colleague and St. Sabina priest Michael Pfleger and all of Clements' four adopted sons. Both Pfleger and eldest adopted son Joey released public statements on the matter, and the Archdiocese of Chicago also released a statement confirming his death.

== Sexual abuse investigations ==
=== 2019 ===
In August 2019, Cardinal Blase Cupich asked Clements to step aside from ministry while the Church investigated allegations that he sexually abused a minor in 1974. The Chicago Police Department referred the allegation to the Archdiocese of Chicago's Office for Child Abuse Investigations, which then reported the allegations to the Illinois Department of Children and Family Services and the Cook County State's Attorney.

The Illinois Department of Children and Family Services later determined that the allegations were "unfounded” (a designation meaning that the DCFS closed the investigation because it did not concern a current child victim). After an 11-month investigation, the Independent Review Board of the Archdiocese of Chicago determined that "'in light of the information presented, there is not reasonable cause to believe that Clements sexually abused' the accuser when he was a minor."

=== 2022 ===
In April 2022, it was revealed that the Archdiocese of Chicago had recently paid an $800,000 settlement involving the sexual abuse of children by local priests, including $100,000 for a claim settled posthumously against Clements concerning alleged abuse in the 1970s. The archdiocese refused to comment on the matter, and has not added Clements to the list of local priests credibly accused of sexual abuse.

== Programs ==
=== One Church-One Child ===
Clements started the One Church-One Child program locally in Chicago at Holy Angels Church in 1980. Though the program was started locally in Chicago, it became a national effort in 1988. The goal of the program was to use churches as a recruitment tool to find adoptive parents for African-American children, a demographic group that often has disproportionately long adoption waiting periods.

=== One Church-One Addict ===
After retiring from Holy Angels, Clements moved to Washington, D.C. In 1994, Clements started a program known as One Church-One Addict. The goal of the program was to assist churches nationwide in helping recovering drug addicts through job counseling, spiritual consolation, and professional treatment.

=== One Church-One Inmate ===
In 1999, Clements started a program called One Church-One Inmate, a collaborative effort to help prison inmates and their families. The program was designed to facilitate the transition of inmates from incarcerated life to a life as productive and "spiritually healed" law-abiding citizens.

== In popular media ==
The Father Clements Story was produced as a television movie in 1987 by NBC and starred actors Lou Gossett, Jr., Malcolm-Jamal Warner, and Carroll O'Connor. Gossett, Jr. played Father Clements, Warner played Clements' adopted son Joey, and O'Connor played Cardinal John Cody, the Archbishop of Chicago.

== Honors and legacy ==
- 1977: Named priest of the year by the Association of Chicago Priests.
- 1982: North American Council on Adoptable Children (NACAC) Award winner.
- 1987: Named an honorary chief by a Yoruba tribe in Nigeria.
- 1981: Received the Jason Award from Children's Square U.S.A. for his dedication to youth.
- April 11, 2002: The Kentucky State Legislature passed a resolution HR 117A, a "RESOLUTION honoring Father George Clements for his tireless devotion to the human race and adjourning in his honor".
- May 2007: Golden Jubilee marks Clements 50th year as a Roman Catholic priest. Celebrated at Hilton Chicago banquet and Jubilee Mass at Holy Angels Church Chicago.
