= National Black Sisters' Conference =

US Catholic nuns' organization

- Abbreviation: NBSC
- Formation: 1968
- Founder: Martin de Porres Grey
- Founded at: Pittsburgh, Pennsylvania
- Headquarters: Washington, D.C.
- Region served: United States
- President: Addie Lorraine Walker
- Subsidiaries: National Black Catholic Women's Gathering
- Affiliations: Black Catholic Joint Conference
- Website: www.nbsc68.org

The National Black Sisters' Conference (NBSC) is an association of Black Catholic religious sisters and nuns based in the United States.

== Founding ==
It was founded in Pittsburgh in 1968 by then-Mercy Sister M. Martin de Porres Grey, following her exclusion from the inaugural meeting of the National Black Catholic Clergy Caucus earlier that same year. Grey led the conference until her departure from religious life in 1974.

== Harriet Tubman Award ==
The Harriet Tubman Award is given to the women of NBSC. Harriet Tubman was called to be a Moses of her people. Each year, NBSC recognizes and honors one of its members who through her ministry is an advocate for Black people. She has a strong identity within the Black community. She is responding to the call to be a Moses to her people.

Awardees have included:

Award year	Recipient
1984	Joel B. Clarke
1985	Thea Bowman
1986	Elizabeth Harris
1987	Calista Robinson
1988	Delores Harrall
1989	Mary Antona Ebo
1990	Louis Marie Bryan
1991	Cora M. Billings
1992	Roland Lagarde
1993	Patricia Haley
1994	Beatrice Jeffries
1995	Loretta T. Richards
1996	Lucy Williams
1997	Patricia J. Chappell
1998	Anita Baird
1999	Jamie T. Phelps
2000	Roberta Fulton
2001	Eva Marie Martin
2002	Jane Nesmith
2003	Josita Colbert
2004	Juanita Shealey
2005	Barbara Spears
2006	Magdala Marie Gilbert
2007	Rosetta M. Brown
2008	Donna Banfield
2009	Maria G. Mannix
2010	Mary Ann Henegan
2011	Rosella Marie Holloman
2012	Patricia Lucas
2013	Gayle Lwanga Crumbley
2014	Barbara Croom
2015	Ronnie Grier
2016	Patricia Rogers
2017	Beulah Martin
2018	Thelma Mitchell
2019	Patricia Ralph
2020	No Award
2021	No Award
2022	Addie Lorraine Walker
2023	No Award
2024	Sr. Eva Marie Lumas, SSS
