= Diana L. Hayes =

American Catholic professor and theologian (born 1947)

- Born: 1947 (age 78–79)
- Occupations: Professor; theologian

Diana Lynn Hayes (born 1947) is an American Catholic theologian specializing in womanism and Black theology. The first African-American woman to earn a pontifical doctorate in theology, she is professor emerita of systematic theology at Georgetown University.

== Biography ==
Diana Lynn Hayes was born in 1947. Hayes did undergraduate study at the University at Buffalo before gaining a Juris Doctor degree at George Washington University National Law Center. She gained a baccalaureate degree and a licentiate in sacred theology from the Catholic University of America, writing a dissertation on the theology of James H. Cone. She went on to gain a doctoral degree in religious studies, and a pontifical doctorate at KU Leuven, where she wrote a dissertation on liberation theology.

In addition to teaching at Georgetown University, Hayes has also served on the faculty of the Oblate School of Theology and Xavier University of Louisiana's Institute for Black Catholic Studies. Hayes is a member of the Black Catholic Theological Symposium, and has contributed to National Catholic Reporter.

== Works ==
- Hagar's Daughters: Womanist Ways of Being in the World. New York: Paulist Press, 1995.
- Trouble Don't Last Always: Soul Prayers. Liturgical Press, 1995.
- And Still We Rise: An Introduction to Black Liberation Theology. New York: Paulist Press, 1996.
- Taking Down Our Harps: Black Catholics in the United States. Maryknoll, N.Y.: Orbis Books, 1998.
- Were You There?: Stations of the Cross. Maryknoll, N.Y.: Orbis Books, 2000.
- Many Faces, One Church: Cultural diversity and the Catholic Experience in the US, Sheed and Ward, 2004.
- (ed. with Peter C. Phan) Many faces, one church: cultural diversity and the American Catholic experience. Lanham: Rowman & Littlefield Publishers, Inc., 2005.
- Standing in the Shoes my Mother Made: a Womanist Theology. Lanham: Fortress Press, 2010.
- Forged in the Fiery Furnace; African American Spirituality. Maryknoll, N.Y.: Orbis Books, 2012.
- No Crystal Stair: Womanist Spirituality. Maryknoll, N.Y.: Orbis Books, 2016.
