= National Black Catholic Clergy Caucus =

Catholic African-American organization

- Abbreviation: NBCCC
- Formation: 1968
- Founder: Father Herman Porter
- Founded at: Detroit, Michigan
- Type: Non-governmental organization
- Region served: United States
- Members: Active and retired African American bishops, priests, deacons, religious brothers, and seminarians of the Catholic Church in the United States.
- President: Father Kareem Smith
- Affiliations: National Association of Black Catholic Deacons; National Black Seminarians Association; National Black Sisters Conference; Black Catholic Joint Conference
- Website: nbccc.cc

The National Black Catholic Clergy Caucus (NBCCC) is an organization of African-American clergy, religious, and seminarians within the Catholic Church in the United States of America.

== History ==
The group was founded in April 1968, shortly after the assassination of Martin Luther King Jr. The new group was convened in Detroit by Fr Herman A. Porter, who sent out a call to Black Catholic clergy nationwide. A religious brother, a religious sister (Sr. Martin De Porres Grey, RSM), and a White clergyman also attempted to attend, but were eventually rebuffed. (Grey went on to found the National Black Sisters Conference shortly thereafter.)

The group discussed the situation before them, and formulated a statement that, after being published, made waves within the Church, largely due to its opening line:

The Catholic Church in the United States, primarily a white racist institution, has addressed itself primarily to white society and is definitely a part of that society. On the contrary, we feel that her primary, though not exclusive work, should be in the area of institutional, attitudinal and societal change.

The statement also made a number of demands of the largely White hierarchy, most of which went unanswered.

The group has continued to meet annually since, including in a joint conference with the NBSC and the National Black Seminarians' Association (NBCSA), a constituent organization of the NBCCC.

In 2020, the NBCCC teamed with the NBSC, National Association of Black Catholic Administrators, and the Institute for Black Catholic Studies to make a statement in support of the Black Lives Matter movement.

== Joseph Davis Award ==
Each year during the Black Catholic Joint Conference with Black sisters, seminarians, deacons and their wives, the NBCCC bestows the Fr Joseph M. Davis Award for lifetime achievement, so named in honor of the NBCCC's first executive director.

Awardees have included:

- Brother Booker Ashe, OFM Cap.
- Father Joseph Brown, SJ
- Bishop Dominic Carmon, SVD
- Father George H. Clements
- Father Chris Coleman
- Deacon Dunn Cumby
- Father Cyprian Davis, OSB
- Brother Joseph Davis, SM
- Bishop Joseph Francis, SVD
- Brother Loyola Freightman, OFM
- Father Jim Goode, OFM
- Father Boniface Hardin, OSB
- Archbishop James P. Lyke, OFM
- Father Al McKnight, CSSP
- Deacon Arthur "Art" Miller
- Father William Norvel, SSJ
- Father Herman Porter, SCJ
- Father Thaddeus J. Posey, OFM Cap.
- Deacon Paul Richardson
- Father Clarence Rivers
- Father Cyprian Rowe
- Monsignor Leonard Scott
- Father Charles Smith, SVD
- Father Chester Smith, SVD
- Brother Roy Smith, CSC
- Father Benedict M Taylor, OFM
- Father Wilbur Thomas
- Father August L. Thompson
- Deacon Marvin Threatt
- Deacon Thomas White

== See also ==
- The National Office for Black Catholics
