= Jamie T. Phelps =

American Catholic theologian (1941–2025)

Sister Jamie T. Phelps OP
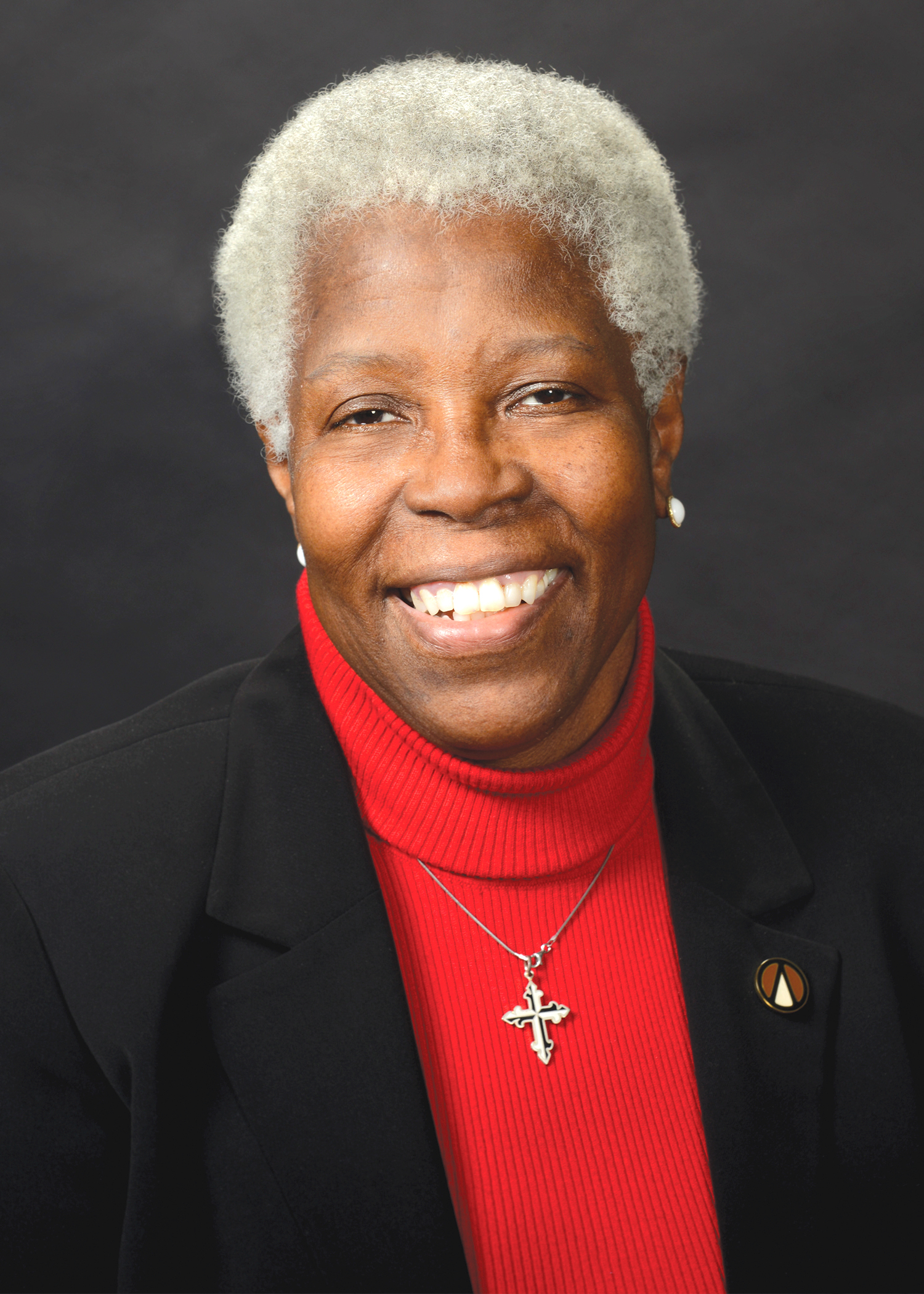
- Born: October 24, 1941; Alabama, U.S.
- Died: November 22, 2025 (aged 84); Adrian, Michigan, U.S.
- Occupation: Theologian

Academic background
- Education: Catholic University of America

Academic work
- Discipline: Systematic theology
- Sub-discipline: Christology; Ecclesiology; Womanist theology
- School or tradition: Catholic theology
- Institutions: Xavier University of Louisiana; Loyola University, Chicago; Seattle University

Jamie Theresa Phelps OP (October 24, 1941 – November 22, 2025) was an African-American Catholic theologian known for her contributions to womanist theology. She was the first Black member of the Adrian Dominican Sisters.

== Biography ==
Phelps was born in Alabama, the youngest of six children of a Catholic household. She became an Adrian Dominican Sister in 1959, desegregating the order from its all-White roots.

She earned a bachelor's degree in sociology, science, and mathematics from Sienna Heights University, an MSW from University of Illinois Chicago, and an MA in theology from Saint John's University, Collegeville, Minnesota. She subsequently pursued her PhD in systematic theology from Catholic University of America, publishing her dissertation in 1989 as The Mission Ecclesiology of John R. Slattery.

She was an associate pastor at Holy Cross School (Chicago) in Woodlawn, Catholic Theological Union at Chicago, Loyola University, Chicago and Seattle University, and for eight years as Director of the Institute for Black Catholic Studies and the Katharine Drexel Professor of Systematic Theology at Xavier University in New Orleans. Phelps helped to restart the annual meetings of Black Catholic Theological Symposium in 1991, after two first meetings in 1978 and 1979.

Phelps died on November 22, 2025, at the age of 84.

== Honors ==
In 1999, Phelps received the Harriet Tubman Award given in 1999 by the National Black Sisters’ Conference honoring a member who “through her ministry is an advocate for Black people.”

In 2010, Phelps received the Ann O'Hara Graff Memorial Award from the Women's Seminar in Constructive Theology of the Catholic Theological Society of America.

In 2016, Phelps received The “How Beautiful Are Their Feet” Award, given at the Samuel DeWitt Proctor Conference, a national network of progressive African American faith leaders and their congregations.

In 2016, Phelps received an honorary doctorate from Aquinas Institute of Theology in St. Louis, a graduate school in the Dominican tradition.

In March 2025, Phelps was honored during the Catholic Theological Union’s Harambee celebration, which supports the Augustus Tolton Pastoral Ministry Program.

== Works ==
- Phelps, Jamie T. (1989). The Mission Ecclesiology of John R. Slattery: A Study of an African-American Mission of the Catholic Church in the Nineteenth Century. Catholic University of America.
- Phelps, Jamie T., ed. (1997). Black and Catholic: The Challenge and Gift of Black Folk : Contributions of African American Experience and Thought to Catholic Theology. Marquette University Press. ISBN 978-0-87462-629-2.
