= List of plantations in Kentucky =

This is a list of plantations (including plantation houses) in the U.S. state of Kentucky, which are: National Historic Landmarks, listed on the National Register of Historic Places, listed on a heritage register, or are otherwise significant for their history, association with significant events or people, or their architecture and design.

Color key	Historic register listing
	National Historic Landmark
	National Register of Historic Places
	Contributing property to a National Register of Historic Places historic district
	Designated Kentucky landmark or Historic Marker
	Designated Kentucky Heritage Farm (Kentucky Heritage Council)
	Not listed on national or state register

NRHP reference number	Name	Image	Date designated	Locality	County	Notes
83002891	Alexander Plantation House		June 23, 1983	Midway	Woodford	Alexander Plantation house is a notable example of early Kentucky stone architecture
83002837	Anatok		February 17, 1983	Bardstown; 37.8081194°N 85.47147740000003°W	Nelson	Currently owned by the Diocese of Louisville. Daniel Rudd, a prominent African-American Catholic journalist, was born into slavery on the plantation in 1854.
123846957	Abell House		October 4, 1979	Middletown	Jefferson	Built in 1804 in the Federal style.
76000913	Arcadia		May 4, 1976	Shelby City	Lincoln	Arcadia is an excellent example of Greek Revival architecture. The house was built in 1836 by Isaac Shelby, Jr, a gentleman farmer, who was the fourth son of Isaac Shelby, the first Governor of Kentucky. Arcadia remained in the Shelby family until the early 1960s. It still contains many pieces of their original furniture.
66000357	Ashland		December 19, 1960	Lexington; 38.02861°N 84.48000°W	Fayette	
88003372	Aspen Hall		February 8, 1989	Harrodsburg	Mercer	
83002633	Beechland		July 12, 1983	Louisville	Jefferson	Site of the marriage of Jefferson Davis to Sarah Knox Taylor, daughter of President Zachary Taylor
83002889	Blossom Hill		July 21, 1983	Milton	Trimble	
98000325	Blue Wing Landing		April 27, 1998	Gratz	Owen	Modernly, the house is known as the Mason Brown House, and was home to the notable Brown family.
88003368	Sutfield House		February 9, 1989	Harrodsurg	Mercer	also known as Alexandria
78001375	The Cedars		1978	Stanford	Lincoln	Built in 1853. Also known as Shadowlands.
76000925	Clay Hill		November 7, 1976	Harrodsburg	Mercer	
93000045	Coleman-Desha Plantation			Cynthiana	Harrison	
76000926	Doricham		October 22, 1976	Harrodsburg	Mercer	
	Duncan Hall			Bloomfield	Nelson	Built by Confederate Major Green Duncan in 1854 and housed 61 slaves. Remained in the same family until the 21st century. Burned in 2009.
83002660	Edgewood		August 16, 1983	Brownsboro Farm	Jefferson	
	Elmwood		1972	Perryville	Boyle	Designated a Kentucky landmark. Served as a hospital during the Battle of Perryville
	Emmick Plantation			Lewisport	Hancock	
	Fairfax Plantation			Bloomfield	Nelson	Built by John Stone, a native of Fairfax County, Va. in 1791. Home was later expanded. Also known as Stoneland.
	Fairfield			Paris	Bourbon	
72000536	Farmington		October 18, 1972	Louisville	Jefferson	
	Fearn Hill			Hunters Bottom	Carroll	
83002668	Fishpool Plantation			Louisville		
	Federal Grove			Auburn	Logan	At its peak, Federal Grove consisted of more than 2,000 acres
71000354	Federal Hill		March 11, 1971	Bardstown	Nelson	
87002189	Forest Hill		December 30, 1987	Stanford	Lincoln	
	Gatliff Plantation				Knox	
	Giltner Plantation			Hunters Bottom	Carroll	In 1848, Francis Giltner was involved in a federal case Giltner vs. Gorham in Michigan, involving runaway slaves from his plantation.
73000786	The Grange		April 11, 1973	Paris	Bourbon	
77000614	Helm Place		August 3, 1978	Lexington	Fayette	Eventual home of Mary Todd Lincoln's sister, Emilie Todd Helm. Also known as Cedar Hall.
	Henry Duncan House			Bloomfield	Nelson	Built by Henry Duncan, a descendant of Christopher Newport and Thomas Bragg, in 1783. Home was enlarged in 1800 and 1815.
80001649	James W. Alcorn House		April 11, 1980	Stanford	Lincoln	Also known as the Hickories at St. Alsaph's.
83002828	Honeysuckle Hill		August 11, 1983	Harrodsburg	Mercer	
	Huston Plantation			Morganfield	Union	The oldest part of the house dates to 1820 with the main section constructed in 1843. The plantation was commandeered by Union forces as a campground during the American Civil War.
71000347	Locust Grove		June 23, 1986	Louisville; 38.28706°N 85.66192°W	Jefferson	
	Longview Farm			Glenview	Jefferson	The home was built in the 1840s, and is listed as it was once a part of Locust Grove Plantation
	Maple Hill Manor			Springfield	Washington	Served as Confederate encampment and Union Hospital. Childhood home of Phil Simms.
84000292	McCutcheon Meadows		November 24, 1984	Auburn	Logan	
	Maplewood Plantation			Walton	Boone	Maplewood was the home to fugitive slave Margaret Garner, and the inspiration for "Sweet Home," the fictional plantation in Toni Morrison's Beloved.
	Mount Brilliant			Lexington	Fayette	Built on 2,000 acres of land gifted by Thomas Jefferson to William Russell in recognition of his brother Henry’s outstanding military service in the French and Indian War.
	Mount Lebanon			Paris	Bourbon	Home to Kentucky's second governor
	Maplewood Plantation			Walton	Boone	Maplewood was the home to fugitive slave Margaret Garner, and the inspiration for "Sweet Home," the fictional plantation in Toni Morrison's Beloved.
00000269	Newell B. McClaskey House		March 24, 2000	Bloomfield	Nelson	
	Oaklawn Plantation			Bardstown	Nelson	Currently a bed and breakfast named Bourbon Manor.
83002855	Oldham Plantation			Falmouth	Pendleton	formerly listed on the National Register of Historic Places
76000907	Oxmoor		July 13, 1976	Louisville	Jefferson	
75000763	Pleasant Retreat		May 6, 1975	Lancaster	Garrard	Home of Kentucky Governor William Owsley and the replica slave cabin featured in Harriet Beecher Stowe's Uncle Tom's Cabin
83002887	Preston Plantation		July 21, 1983	Bedford	Trimble	The plantation consisted of 8,000 acres
76000862	Richwood Plantation		August 11, 1976	Milton	Trimble	
05001316	Ridgeway		November 25, 2005	Cynthiana	Harrison	Also known as Handy House and Chestnut Hall.
79003117	Riverside		April 20, 1979	Louisville	Jefferson	
	Rocky Hill Plantation			Smithland	Livingston	Home to Thomas Jefferson's sister, Lucy Jefferson Lewis. Site of infamous 1811 slave (Slave George) murder.
	Sanford Bishop House			Bloomfield	Nelson	
	Scarlett Berkley Duncan Plantation			Bloomfield	Nelson	
	Slead House			Shelbyville	Shelby	Historically, a 2,000-acre hemp plantation built in 1860 by the Slead Family.
73000814	Sportsman's Hill		April 11, 1973	Crab Orchard	Lincoln	
66000359	Springfield		July 4, 1961	Louisville; 38.27917°N 85.64722°W	Jefferson	The boyhood home of President Zachary Taylor
	Anoatop Plantation			Bloomfield	Nelson	Built by John Jones in the late 1850s. Currently houses a bed and breakfast and winery. Also known as Springhill
	Springrest Plantation			Bloomfield	Nelson	Built by Dr. Micajah Glasscock in 1854.
	Stillwell Heady Plantation			Bloomfield	Nelson	Built by the Heady family off of highway 458.
	Stone Hall Plantation			Bloomfield	Nelson	Built in 1835 by Isaac Davis Stone on land owned by his father since 1791.
	Villa Lawn			Bardstown	Nelson	
	W.J. Kendrick Plantation			Monticello	Wayne	
	Walnut Hill			Gethsemane	Lincoln	Walnut Hill was one of the first brick buildings built in Kentucky, but it was torn down in the 1940s. Only the meat cabin survives.
80001662	Walnut Groves Plantation		April 1, 1980	Bloomfield	Nelson	Also known as Walnut Groves Farm or Merrifield House. Built by Samuel Boone Merrifield around 1830. Owned by the Merrifield, then McClaskey families; then by the Merrfield family again. Now owned by Linda Bruckheimer and her movie producer husband, Jerry.
71000342	Waveland Plantation		August 12, 1971	Lexington	Fayette	
85001841	Ward Hall		August 23, 1985	Georgetown	Scott	Home to the family of famed Southern Belle Sallie Ward and Kentucky's Confederate Governor George Johnson.
71000352	White Hall		March 11, 1971	Richmond	Madison	
84001824	Anderson-Smith House		March 1, 1984	Paducah	McCracken	Serves as an official Kentucky Welcome Center and houses the furniture of Vice-President Alben Barkley. Also known as Whitehaven or "Bide-a-wee."
73000824	Wickland		February 16, 1973	Bardstown	Nelson	Has been the home of 3 governors: two from Kentucky and one from Louisiana
	William Gatewood Plantation			Bedford	Trimble	Author and abolitionist Henry Bibb was enslaved on this plantation. After seeing six of his younger brothers sold away to other slave owners, Bibb escaped from slavery in 1842 and went on to work as an abolitionist and set up the first black newspaper in Canada.
10000904	Woodstock Plantation		November 10, 2010	Trenton	Todd	Built in 1830, the home was once part of the 3,000 acres Woodstock Plantation.

== See also ==
- List of plantations in the United States
- Plantation Complexes in the Southern United States
- Plantations in the American South
