= NOBC (disambiguation) =

This page is intended to list all groups whose initials start with or contain the letters NOBC as a string, however capitalised

- NOBC – The National Office for Black Catholics, a US organisation
- NOBCChE – the National Organization for the Professional Advancement of Black Chemists and Chemical Engineers, a US organisation
