= Knights of Peter Claver =

African-American Catholic fraternal order

- Abbreviation: KPC
- Formation: November 7, 1909; 116 years ago
- Type: Catholic fraternal service organization
- Headquarters: 1825 Orleans Ave, New Orleans
- Members: Registered knights, ladies, junior knights, and junior daughters
- Supreme Knight: Dr. Christopher Pichon
- Supreme Lady: Hilda Wiltz
- Main organ: Councils (men) and courts (women)
- Affiliations: Saint Peter Claver Foundation
- Website: www.kofpc.org

The Knights of Peter Claver and Ladies Auxiliary is an international Catholic fraternal service order. Founded in 1909 by the Josephites and parishioners from Most Pure Heart of Mary Catholic Church in Mobile, Alabama, it is the largest and oldest Black Catholic lay-led organization still in existence.

The Knights of Peter Claver supports more than 700 subordinate units throughout the United States and in South America, as of 2019.

== History ==
=== Founding ===
The organization was founded in 1909 in Mobile, Alabama. The founders included Josephite father Conrad Friedrich Rebesher, a native of Kłodawa, Poland and pastor of Most Pure Heart of Mary Parish; 3 other Josephite priests: Father Samuel Joseph Kelly, Father Joseph Peter Van Baast, and Father John Henry Dorsey; and 3 Black laymen: Gilbert Faustina, Francis Xavier "Frank" Collins, and Francis "Frank" Trenier. Their initiation ceremony was attended by their bishop, Edward Patrick Allen.

The organization's model was based on other Catholic fraternal orders such as the Knights of Columbus, who at the time did not allow Black members in all of their councils. This reality illustrated the need for a Black Catholic fraternal order.

=== Early years ===
The Sublimed and Meritorious Fourth Degree was organized in 1917. This division is open to Knights who after two years of continual membership have proven themselves to be active workers in the Church, the community, and the Noble Order.

A program for Junior Knights existed from the Order's earliest days. The constitution of the Junior Knights Division was adopted in 1917 and the division formally recognized in 1935.

In 1922, a Ladies Auxiliary was formed to provide the same opportunities for Catholic action to African American lay women. The Auxiliary was officially recognized as a division of the Order in 1926. The Junior Daughters division was officially recognized in 1930.

==== Conflict ====
During the 1920s, Thomas Wyatt Turner's Federated Colored Catholics locked horns with the Knights of Peter Claver over their reticence to speak out on racism and segregation.

The conflict eventually resulted in the expulsion of Bro. Marcellus Dorsey, the brother of Knights of Peter Claver co-founder Fr Dorsey (a member of the Josephites, which then restricted Black applicants). This was mainly due to Marcellus criticizing the Josephites in the press.

The order would come to oppose segregation openly beginning in 1939.

=== Modern era ===
In more recent years, order has responded to the charitable appeals of many national and international organizations such as the NAACP, the UNCF, Catholic elementary and secondary schools, Xavier University of Louisiana, the National Urban League, the Sickle Cell Anemia Foundation, the Sister Thea Bowman Black Catholic Educational Foundation, the International Alliance of Catholic Knights, the National Black Catholic Congress, the National Black Catholic Clergy Caucus, the National Black Sisters Conference, and the National Council of Negro Women.

A Fourth Degree for the Auxiliary, the Ladies of Grace, was established for members of the Ladies Auxiliary in 1979.

In 2006, the U.S. Conference of Catholic Bishops renewed a grant to the organization to continue the National Environmental Health and Justice Literacy Project, a program designed to educate citizens of poor communities about environmental health hazards. Recently, the organization has provided disaster relief support on several occasions and has adopted numerous social justice causes as its mantra. Most notably, the Junior Division (youth) are promoting clean water initiatives and sufficient housing for the world's underserved in addition to their efforts to eradicate diabetes in the black community.

The order established their first and only collegiate units in 2018, at Xavier University of Louisiana.

== Name ==
The order is named after St. Peter Claver, a Jesuit priest from Spain who ministered to Africans enslaved in Cartagena, Colombia, in the 17th century. Peter Claver is said to have converted more than 300,000 of them to Catholicism.

== Organization ==
The organization is active in the United States and South America. It has over 400 Councils (men) and Courts (ladies) throughout the U.S. and on San Andres Island in Colombia; young people aged between the ages of 7 and 18 years old can join Junior Councils (young men) and Junior Courts (young ladies).

Members of the Fourth Degree Knights are addressed as "Sir Knight," and members of the Fourth Degree Ladies of Grace are addressed as "Gracious Lady."

The Knights are member of the worldwide International Alliance of Catholic Knights.

== Activities ==
=== Purposes ===
- To support a local pastor, parish and bishop.
- To become active, as a group, in a Knights respective community.
- To instill civic pride & action.
- To engage Knights in opportunities that will allow them to demonstrate their Catholicism.
- To allow for social interaction by creating gatherings that might foster a sense of community.
- To provide for the awarding of scholarships.
- To develop the character of youth.
- To provide social and intellectual stimulation for its members

=== Ethos ===
The Knights of Peter Claver and Ladies Auxiliary provides opportunities for all Catholics to be actively involved in their faith by living the Gospel message. The Knights of Peter Claver and Ladies Auxiliary engages in a variety of church and community service projects.

== Supreme Knights and Supreme Ladies ==
=== Supreme Knights ===
The following is a list of the Most Worthy Supreme Knights who have served as chief executive officers of the Knights of Peter Claver (and their terms of service):

1. Gilbert Faustina † (1909–1926)
2. Louis Israel † (1926–1940)
3. Alphonse Pierre Auguste † (1941)
4. John Henry Clouser † (1941–1946)
5. Joseph Roland Prejean † (1946–1952)
6. Beverly Victor Baranco Jr., KSG † (1952–1958)
7. Eugene Boone Perry † (1958–1964)
8. Shields Gilbert Gilmore † (1964–1970)
9. Ernest Granger Sr., KSG † (1970–1976)
10. Murry J. Frank † (1976–1982)
11. Chester J. Jones, KSG (1982–1988)
12. Paul Camille Condoll † (1988–1994)
13. Andrew Jackie Elly (1994–2000)
14. Arthur Cecil McFarland, Esq. (2000–2006)
15. Gene Anthony Phillips Sr., KC*HS † (2006–2010)
16. Dr. F(redron) DeKarlos Blackmon, OblSB, KCHS (2010–2016)
17. James Kenneth Ellis (2016–2022)
18. Dr. Christopher Pichon (2022-)

=== Supreme Ladies ===
The following is a list of the Most Esteemed Supreme Ladies who have served the Knights of Peter Claver Ladies Auxiliary (and their terms of service):

1. Mary Lula Figaro Lunnon † (1926–1928)
2. Alfaretta Ruth O'Ferrall Aubry † (1928–1952)
3. Lucy Elizabeth Huff Jones † (1952–1958)
4. Inez Young Bowman † (1958–1964)
5. Thelma Perrault Lombard † (1964–1970)
6. Florence Madeleine Woodfork Lee † (1970–1976)
7. Elise LeNoir Morris † (1976–1982)
8. Consuella Broussard † (1982–1988)
9. Dorothy B. Henderson † (1988–1994)
10. Leodia Gooch (1994–2000)
11. Mary Louise Briers (2000–2006)
12. Dr. Geralyn Carmouche Shelvin (2006–2012)
13. Vertelle Amos Kenion (2012–2018)
14. Micaela J. A. LeBlanc (2018–2024)
15. Hilda Wiltz (2024–)

== Buildings ==
- The Peter Claver Building, a historic building in New Orleans served as national headquarters of the organization during 1951 to 1974, when a new, adjacent building was constructed. The KPC headquarters also served as the office space for the attorney A. P. Tureaud, Sr. during his crusade against legalized segregation.

== Notable members ==
- Cardinal Wilton Gregory of Washington, first African-American cardinal
- Charles A. Coulombe Author and monarchist
- Cardinal Daniel DiNardo of Galveston-Houston
- Archbishop Shelton Fabre of Louisville, National Chaplain
- Bishop Martin Holley of Memphis, Past National Chaplain
- A. P. Tureaud, Sr, famed black attorney who helped desegregate US schools
- Bishop Harold R. Perry, one of the first black bishops in the US and the first Black clergyman to open Congress with a prayer
- Bishop J. Terry Steib, SVD of Memphis
- Auxiliary Bishop Joseph N. Perry of Chicago
- Ralph Metcalfe, Olympic athlete and politician
- Ernest "Dutch" Morial, first Black mayor of New Orleans
- Sylvester O. Rhem, Chicago politician
- Bishop Kevin Vann of Orange
- Bishop David Talley of Memphis
- Cardinal Raymond Burke
- Archbishop Allen Vigneron of Detroit
- Archbishop Joe S. Vásquez of Galveston-Houston
- Bishop Charles Michael Jarrell of Lafayette
- Auxiliary Bishop David G. O'Connell of Los Angeles
- Bishop Paul Loverde of Arlington
- Auxiliary Bishop Eduardo Nevares of Phoenix
- Bishop David Toups of Beaumont
- Bishop Curtis J. Guillory of Beaumont, Past National Chaplain
- Bishop Brendan J. Cahill of Victoria
