= Federated Colored Catholics =

African-American Catholic organization

The Federated Colored Catholics (FCC), originally the Committee against the Extension of Race Prejudice in the Church, then the Committee for the Advancement of Colored Catholics, was a Black Catholic organization founded in 1925 by Thomas Wyatt Turner. It was a kind of spiritual successor to Daniel Rudd's Colored Catholic Congress movement (1889–1904), providing an organized voice in an era of nearly unchecked anti-Blackness and systemic racism. After a hostile takeover, it folded in the 1950s.

== History ==
The FCC was originally founded in December 1925 as a small group advocating for Black uplift, and later expanded within the local area before becoming a federated group of chapters in various other cities.

They engaged in a number of social justice efforts, including a concerted push for more Black priests, who at the time were extremely few. (US seminaries had been entirely closed to Blacks until the late 19th century, and to a continuing extent thereafter.) The FCC's main target in this regard was the Society of St Joseph of the Sacred Heart, a mostly White order that ministered specifically to African-Americans. At the FCC's meeting in 1928 in Cincinnati, several of the first openly Black Catholic priests were mentioned in the program, including Frs Augustus Tolton, John Henry Dorsey, SSJ; Charles Uncles, SSJ; Stephen Theobald, Norman Dukette; Joseph A. John, SMA; and Augustine Derricks, OSST.

The clashes between the FCC and the Josephites would eventually lead to the expulsion of FCC firebrand Marcellus Dorsey (brother of Josephite priest John Dorsey) from the Knights of Peter Claver, a Black Catholic fraternal organization the Josephites helped found in 1909.

Two White Jesuit priests, John LaFarge Jr. and William Markoe, later became major backers of and leaders in the FCC, and helped publish the FCC's official publication, The Chronicle. LaFarge and Markoe eventually pushed the organization away from a Black advocacy group into a more interracial direction—against Turner's will. The group would eventually splinter over this conflict, with LaFarge establishing the short-lived Catholic Interracial Council of New York, which spawned several other chapters.

The FCC would itself die off in 1952, eventually succeeded by other national Black Catholic organizations such as the National Black Catholic Congress.
