= American Catholic Tribune =

American newspaper (1886–1897)

The American Catholic Tribune was an African-American newspaper published in Cincinnati, Ohio, from 1886 to 1894 and then in Detroit until 1897. Daniel Rudd was its co-founder and editor.

== History ==
Rudd, who had been enslaved in Bardstown, Kentucky, established ACT's predecessor, the Ohio State Tribune, in Springfield, Ohio. He moved to Cincinnati and renamed it in 1886, a reorganization to make it a national newspaper. ACT was initially a joint venture between Rudd and Dr. James Theodore Whiston, and the project received support from Archbishop William Henry Elder of Cincinnati.

Rudd also organized the Colored Catholic Congress, which met in 1889 and continued until 1894. The paper reached the 10,000 circulation mark and relocated to Detroit before an economic downturn took its toll and ACT ceased operation in 1897.

Historical markers commemorate Rudd's work and legacy in Bardstown, Kentucky, and Springfield, Ohio.

== See also ==
- African American newspapers
