= William Edgar Easton =

American playwright and journalist

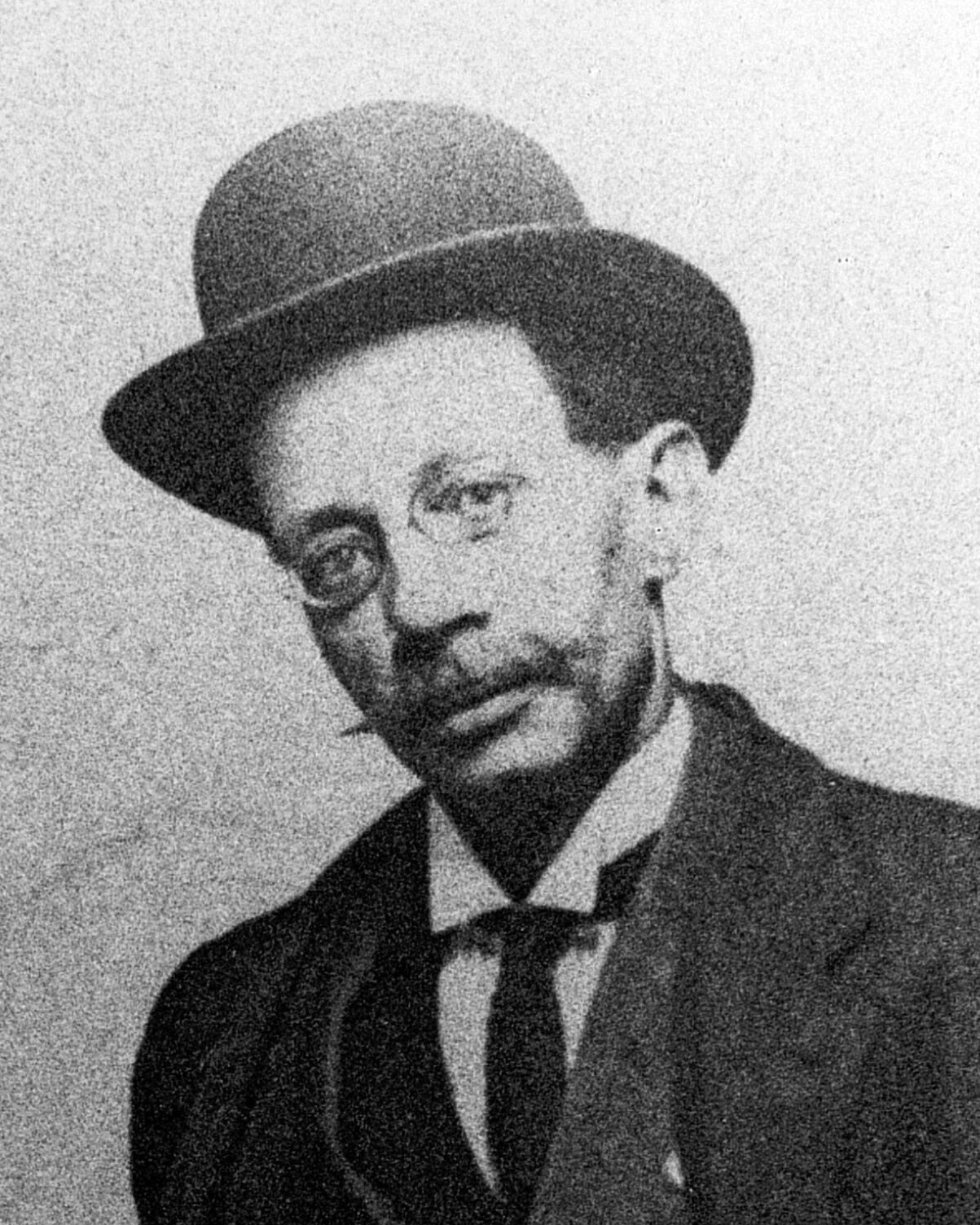
- Easton, late 1900s
- Born: March 19, 1861; New York City, New York
- Died: January 10, 1936 (aged 74); Los Angeles, California
- Spouse: Mary Elizabeth Easton (m. 1888)
- Writing career
- Notable works: Dessalines (1893); Christophe (1911)

William Edgar Easton (Note: Often, following the fashion of the day, "William" was abbreviated to "W." or "Wm." He was occasionally known as simply "Edgar Easton" and sometimes as "Bill Easton".) (March 19, 1861 – January 10, 1936) was an American playwright, journalist, and political activist. He wrote two plays about the Haitian Revolution and its aftermath: Dessalines (1893), a historical drama about Jean-Jacques Dessalines; and Christophe (1911), a drama about Henri Christophe, King of Haiti following the Revolution.

== Life ==
=== Early years (1861–1883) ===
Easton was born on March 19, 1861, in New York City, to Marie Antoinette Leggett-Easton and Charles F. Easton. His mother was a native French speaker whose family had immigrated to New Orleans from France; the Eastons spoke both English and French at home. Marie Antoinette Leggett-Easton was descended from a participant in the Haitian Revolution.

On his father's side, he was a descendant of Moses Easton, the brother of James Easton. James was a veteran of the Revolutionary War—he planned the fortification of Dorchester Heights—and a prominent figure in the Black community of Massachusetts in the early Republic.

Although born in New York, Easton grew up mainly in New Bedford, Massachusetts. His mother died when he was 13 years old. Following her death, he came under the care of his godmother, whom Beasley calls the "Baroness de Hoffman". The Baroness, in turn, put Easton under the care of an unnamed Catholic priest.

Thereafter, Easton attended school at a number of Catholic institutions: a seminary in Trois-Rivières, Quebec, likely the Séminaire Saint-Joseph de Trois-Rivières; La Salle Academy in Providence, Rhode Island; and in a "college of the Congregation of St Croix". Beasley does not record which college this was, but the use of the French term Sainte Croix for "Holy Cross" suggests that Easton attended one of the several schools in Quebec organized by the Congregation. Another source claims he attended "St. Caesar's College, Canada". This appears to be a reference to Collège Saint-Césaire, in Saint-Césaire, Quebec, which founded in 1869 by a member of the Congregation of Holy Cross.

=== Texas (1883–1901) ===
Easton moved to Texas at age 22. Price notes that was a momentous and somewhat unusual decision for Easton to have made, given that he was "a young man just out of a Canadian Catholic seminary".

He married Mary Elizabeth Easton in 1888 in Austin. He worked as a teacher from roughly 1882 to 1885.

While in Texas, Easton edited at least three newspapers: the Citizen, the Blade, and the Globe. (Note: As of the late 1880s, there were two Blade newspapers in Texas: one in Austin, and one in Galveston. Given that the one in Galveston is designated as a "colored" newspaper with a Republican affiliation, this is presumably the one Easton founded.) He later served as the inaugural president of the Colored State Press Association.

He also held a number of positions with the state Republican Party, beginning an activist career that would last long after he departed Texas.

=== California (1901–1936) ===
Easton appears to have moved to California sometime in 1901: in July 1924, he recorded in a biographical sketch he completed for the California State Library that he been in California for 23 years. At the time he completed that profile, he lived at 1764 West 35th Street, Los Angeles and had three daughters and one son.

While in California, he held various positions in journalism and politics. Among many other jobs, he worked for a time as a speechwriter for the Republican and Progressive parties.

In 1911, he published an editorial in the Los Angeles Herald, denouncing the assault of Booker T. Washington that year in New York City. He wrote: "[t]he ruthless murder of Dr. Washington (call it by its proper name, for that was what was intended) would not only have been the crowning misfortune of the colored race, but a dreadful menace to the state—to the whole nation, the nation that is at this time so seriously endeavoring to solve a most momentuous [sic] problem".

During World War I, he was picked by Emmett Jay Scott to serve as a member of the Speakers Bureau of the Department of War. After the war ended, he was "designated by the California Historical Survey Commission as chairman of a sub-committee of the California War History Committee to gather and preserve material and information regarding the activities of the colored race in California in connection with their part in helping to win the war".

Easton died on January 10, 1936, at his home in Los Angeles. He was buried at Calvary Cemetery.

=== Religious views ===
Easton was Catholic until "sometime after … 1893", when he joined the African Methodist Episcopal Church. He had previously been active in the Colored Catholic Congress, founded in the late 1880s by Daniel Rudd.

In 1893, he delivered a lecture on "The Catholic Church and the Negro Race" at St. Joseph's Hall in New Orleans.

== Works ==
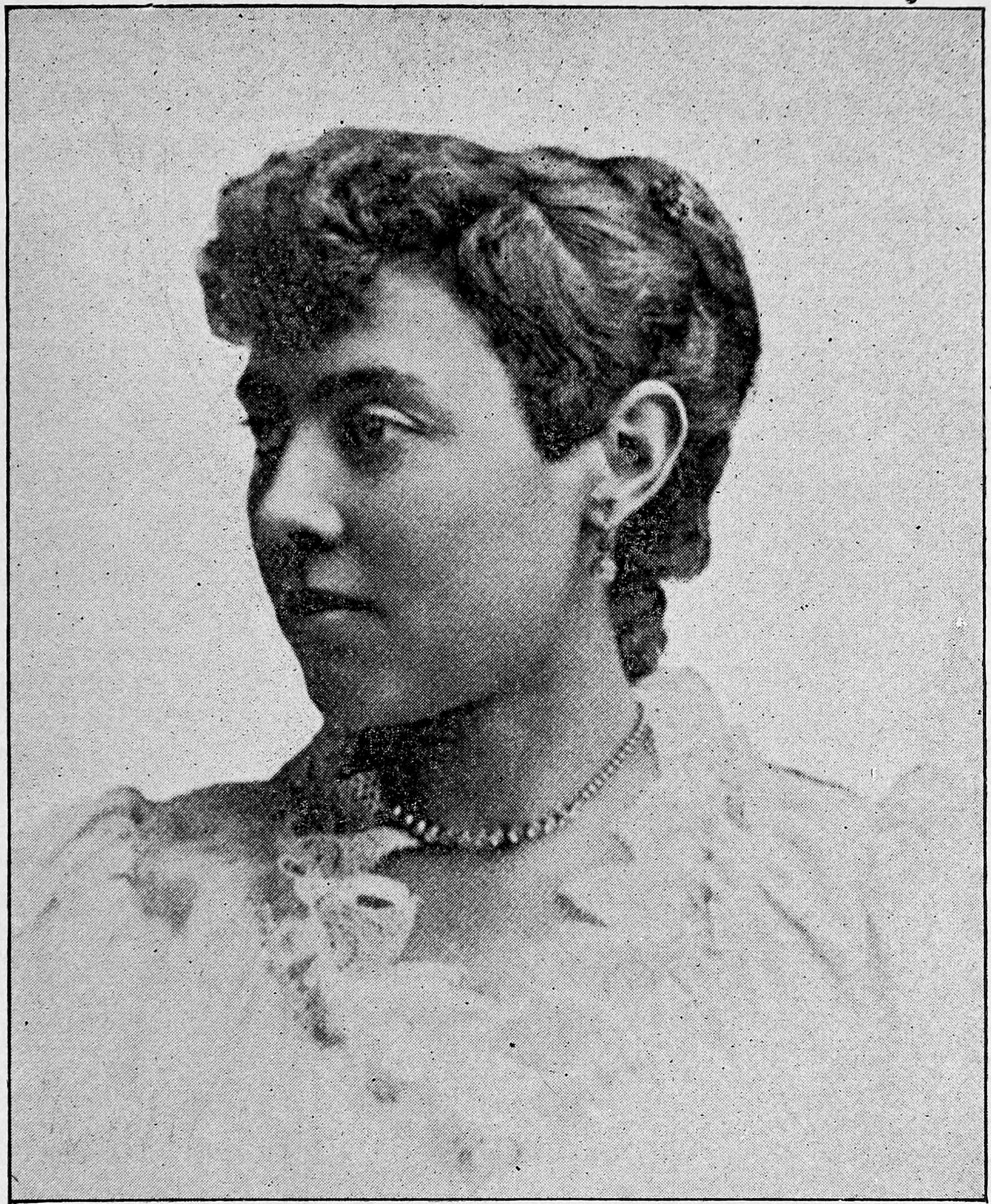
Henrietta Vinton Davis, star and producer of Dessalines and Christophe.

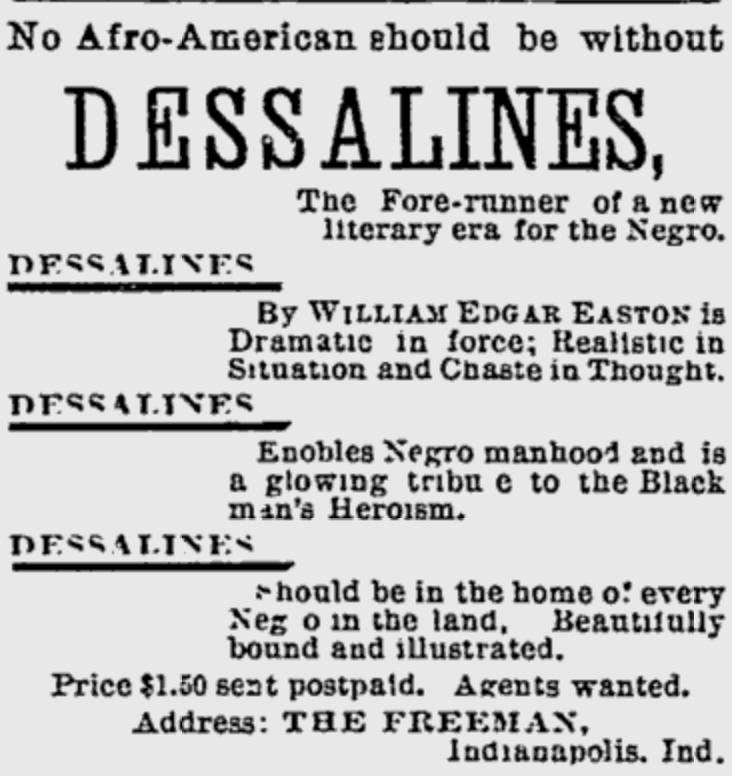
Advertisement for Dessalines in the Indianapolis Freeman, 1893.

Easton wrote two plays that received wide notice at the time, both about prominent figures in the Haitian Revolution: Dessalines (1893) and Christophe (1911). Henrietta Vinton Davis produced and starred in both. He also wrote two other short plays, Is She a Lady in the Underworld? and Misery in Bohemia, which do not seem to have been staged.

=== Dessalines ===
Hill and Hatch describe Dessalines as a "romantic melodrama written in blank verse". The titular character and male lead of Dessalines is Jean-Jacques Dessalines, a key figure in Haiti's early military and political history. The plot concerns Dessalines's exploits and his relationship with Clarisse, a (probably) mythical figure who converts him to Christianity. Byrd and Twa note that the play glosses over Dessalines's "massacres" and "despotism" in favor of a focus on religious and romantic themes.

Byrd argues that Dessalines should be interpreted in light of late 19th-century views of Black masculinity in America. The ideology of white supremacy painted Black people—and in, particular, Black men—as weak, uncivilized, and incapable of running their own affairs. In the view of a number of contemporary Black intellectuals, the example of Haiti and its revolution provided a counterpoint to this ideological fiction: Haiti was an independent republic, like the United States, which had expelled its colonial governors and created a new nation.

In his preface to Dessalines, Easton lamented what he saw as a failure to properly memorialize the heroic deeds of Black people:

The Negro alone fails to immortalize his distinguished dead, and leaves to the prejudiced pen of other races, the office, which, by a proper conception of duty to posterity, very properly becomes his duty. …

… the author of this work hopes to see a happier era inaugurated by the constant production of legitimate drama, written exclusively for Negro players and meeting, he hopes, with the full endorsement of the brother in white.

For the reasons, as above enumerated, has the author presumed to lay on the altar of race pride the dramatic tale of the heroic Dessalines.

The Chicago premiere of Dessalines was at Freiburg's Opera House, on 22nd Street, in September 1893. It featured "a complete cast of colored characters". Henrietta Vinton Davis played Clarisse.

The premiere was scheduled to coincide with the 1893 World's Columbian Exhibition, but was not billed officially as part of the Exhibition program. Rather, Twa observes that it was staged in "protest against the Exposition's exclusion of African Americans in its planning and the rejection of many proposals for exhibits to display the accomplishments of African Americans". Hill and Hatch count two other runs of Dessalines: one in Pittsburgh in 1909, which Davis directed and starred in; and one in Boston in 1930, in a company led by Maud Cuney Hare.

The play was reviewed in the Indianapolis Freeman in April 1893. The reviewer expressed some displeasure that Easton had not chosen a subject from American history, writing:

… we sincerely hope … the splendid inspiring example set by Mr. Easton being emulated, will yet give us from the pen of some one of our many brilliant and growing crop of race writers, a drama purely American …

The Freeman later offered its readers a copy of Dessalines as part of a holiday promotion.

Albion W. Tourgée reportedly stated at the time that Dessalines was "the highest evidence of literary culture thus far produced by an American negro".

=== Christophe ===
Christophe, reportedly written for Davis, was staged in New York and Los Angeles in spring 1912. In New York, it opened at the Lenox Casino in Harlem, at 102 West 116th Street and Lenox Avenue (now known as Malcolm X Boulevard).

Besides Davis, cast members included R. Henri Strange, Lawrence Chenault, Frederick Douglass Hogan, Otis Sherman, and Blanche DeForrest.

Proceeds from the New York staging went to a provisional Black regiment of the New York National Guard commanded by Charles W. Fillmore.

== Sources ==
- Beasley, Delilah Leontium (1919). The Negro Trail Blazers of California. Los Angeles. OCLC 1049895897.
- Byrd, Brandon R. (November 8, 2019). The Black Republic: African Americans and the Fate of Haiti. Philadelphia: University of Pennsylvania Press. doi:10.9783/9780812296549. ISBN 978-0-8122-5170-8. S2CID 219809224.
- Hill, Errol G.; Hatch, James V. (July 17, 2003). A History of African American Theatre. Cambridge: Cambridge University Press. p. 138. ISBN 978-0-521-62443-5.
- Price, George R. (July 2006). The Easton Family of Southeast Massachusetts: The Dynamics Surrounding Five Generations of Human Rights Activism, 1753–1935 (PhD thesis). University of Montana.
- Twa, Lindsay J. (July 5, 2017). Visualizing Haiti in U.S. Culture, 1910–1950. Abingdon, Oxfordshire, England: Routledge. ISBN 978-1-351-53740-7.
- World's Columbian Catholic Congresses and Educational Exhibit. Chicago: J. S. Hyland. 1893. p. 122.
