= John LaFarge Jr. =

American Jesuit Catholic priest (1880–1963)

John LaFarge Jr. SJ
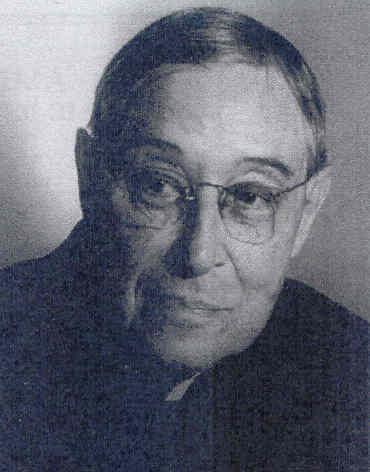

Personal life
- Born: February 13, 1880 Newport, Rhode Island, U.S.
- Died: November 24, 1963 (aged 83) New York City, U.S.
- Education: Harvard University; University of Innsbruck

Religious life
- Religion: Roman Catholic
- Ordination: July 26, 1905 (aged 25)

John LaFarge Jr. SJ (February 13, 1880 – November 24, 1963) was an American Jesuit Catholic priest known for his activism against racism and anti-semitism. Involved in the heyday (and eventual breakup) of Thomas Wyatt Turner's Federated Colored Catholics, LaFarge founded an offshoot, the Catholic Interracial Council in New York City. Branches also grew in Philadelphia and Chicago. In the run-up to World War II, he worked on a draft of a papal encyclical against racist and totalitarian ideologies for Pope Pius XI; entitled Humani generis unitas, though it was never promulgated due to the death of Pius XI on February 10, 1939.

== Early life and education ==
John LaFarge was born on February 13, 1880, in Newport, Rhode Island. He was the youngest son of the artist John La Farge (1835–1910), who was a descendant of French refugees, and his mother Margaret Mason Perry La Farge was a granddaughter of Commodore Oliver Hazard Perry and a great-great-granddaughter of Benjamin Franklin. His siblings included Christopher Grant (who became an architect and partner in the firm of Heins & LaFarge), Emily Marie, John Louis Bancel, Margaret Angela, Oliver Hazard Perry (who also became an architect), Frances, and Joseph Raymond (who did not survive infancy).

LaFarge was gifted at music and languages, eventually becoming fluent in both French and German. At the age of 10, he edited The Sunlight, a monthly magazine put out by a group of his friends, one of whom had access to a hand printing press. LaFarge wrote a serialized science fiction story for the magazine under the title "Trip to Mars". As a child he met a number of notable friends of the family, including Henry Adams, Edith Wharton, Theodore Roosevelt, and William and Henry James; he later became friendly at college with William and Henry's younger brother Robertson James.

In 1897, he entered Harvard University, graduating with the class of 1901. During his studies, he focused mainly on classical Latin and Greek. He also published several articles in The Harvard Monthly.

== Priesthood ==
LaFarge was drawn to the priesthood early, though he also considered careers in the navy or the professoriate. In the fall of 1901, he went to Austria to study theology at the University of Innsbruck. On July 26, 1905, he was ordained a priest in Innsbruck and joined the Society of Jesus. He returned to the United States, where, in the fall, the Jesuits sent him to St. Andrew-on-Hudson in Hyde Park, New York for his novitiate years in the society. In 1907, he was sent to Canisius College in Buffalo, New York to teach humanities to freshmen for a semester, and then to Loyola University Maryland for another semester of teaching. He afterwards spent two years at Woodstock College in Maryland, where he received his master's degree in philosophy.

LaFarge was plagued by ill health throughout his youth, and the completion of his M.A. degree left him severely exhausted. His superiors advised him that he probably couldn't support the rigors of life as a scholar. He moved into pastoral work, spending fifteen years (1911–26) ministering to mainly African-American and immigrant communities in rural St. Mary's County, Maryland, along Chesapeake Bay. His work there deeply shaped his attitude to race relations and to racism, which he considered a sin. He spoke out publicly against the conditions under which African-Americans lived and demonstrated special interest in furthering education for disadvantaged communities. In 1924, he founded a co-educational academic-industrial school in southern Maryland for African-Americans called the Cardinal Gibbons Institute.

== Writings on racism and anti-Semitism ==
In 1926, LaFarge left his pastoral work in Maryland to become assistant editor of America, a leading Jesuit weekly magazine in the United States. He went on to become its fifth editor-in-chief in 1944. Acknowledging that he was not a great administrator, he stepped down after four years and assumed the position of associate editor. All told, he worked on the magazine for 37 years and he is credited with establishing a progressive editorial tone that the magazine has largely retained. He described himself as a priest who was also a working journalist, someone whose main task it was to study the events of the day and to connect them with deep moral and theological questions. His writings and newspaper articles on racism attracted broad public attention in the United States and abroad. In addition to his work for America, he published his writing in such publications as Commonweal, The Saturday Review, Liturgical Arts, Sign, and Catholic World, as well as turning out several dozen book reviews each year for various magazines and newspapers.

In 1937, LaFarge published what would become his most important book on racism, Interracial Justice: A Study of the Catholic Doctrine of Race Relations. In it, he argued against then-prevalent ideas about the innate inferiority of African Americans and for the position that social disparities stemmed from the longstanding economic and cultural mistreatment of African Americans at the hands of America's ruling classes. He also argued vigorously against segregation and the 'separate but equal' doctrine. A revised and expanded edition was published in 1943 under the title The Race Question and the Negro.

One of the people impressed by LaFarge's arguments was Pope Pius XI, who invited him to secretly prepare an encyclical on "racialism", the topic he considered to be the "most burning". The superior general of the Jesuits subsequently assigned two other priests – Fathers Gustav Gundlach and Gustave Desbuquois – to join LaFarge. Entitled Humani generis unitas ("On The Unity of the Human Race") from its first three words, it was drafted during the summer of 1938 and given to Pius XI near the end of the year. It encompassed a general critique of modern ideas such as the state and race that have diminished human dignity and argued against the moral evils of racism and anti-semitism. It was not promulgated, however, because Pius XI died in early 1939 and his successor, Pope Pius XII, held it back, only taking a few extracts for use in some later encyclicals. For several decades, it remained in obscurity in the Vatican Archives until researchers Georges Passelecq and Bernard Suchecky brought the it to light in the 1990s.

In June 1934, LaFarge founded the Catholic Interracial Council of New York to combat racism, with Emanuel A. Romero as vice president. These councils proliferated across America over the next two decades and in 1959, they merged into the National Catholic Conference on Interracial Justice. As LaFarge's reputation grew, he was given other visible and important offices. At various times, he was chaplain of the Society of the Catholic Laity, an officer of the Catholic Association for International Peace, vice-president of the American Catholic Historical Association, and chaplain of the Liturgical Society of Arts.

In 1947, LaFarge was invited to give the prestigious Dudleian lecture at Harvard; he chose for his topic "juridic wholeness," arguing that human rights must apply universally and not just to select groups.

LaFarge's role as a champion of racial justice was sometimes marred by paternalistic attitudes and by his anti-communism. He did not play a major role in the civil rights movement of the late 1950s and early 1960s, in large part due to his age. However, just three months before his death, LaFarge walked in the 1963 March on Washington and stood on the steps of the Lincoln Memorial behind Martin Luther King Jr. for his famous "I Have a Dream" speech, a public acknowledgment of LaFarge's early role in a movement for racial equality that was now being led by others. At his eulogy, Boston's Cardinal Richard Cushing spoke of him as a pioneer in the field of interracial justice.

LaFarge was a member of the Citizens Committee for a Free Cuba, set up in 1963.

== Awards ==
According to an article published in The Catholic Advocate on 4 February 1960, LaFarge received a number of awards from groups who endorsed his activities; the Conference on Science, Philosophy and Religion, the Catholic Interracial Councils of New York, Chicago and St. Louis, the Liberty Medallion of the American Jewish Committee, the Social Justice Award of the National Religion and Labor Foundation, the World Brotherhood Award of the Jewish Theological Seminary of America and the 1955 Peace Award of the Catholic Association for International Peace.

== Publications ==
- Reflections on Growing Old (1963)
- A Report on American Jesuits (with photographs by Margaret Bourke-White) (1956)
- Race Relations (1956)
- The Manner is Ordinary (1953, a memoir)
- The Race Question and the Negro (1943)
- Interracial Justice: A Study of the Catholic Doctrine of Race Relations (1937), archive.org
