= Rhem =

Rhem is a surname. Notable people with the surname include:

- Flint Rhem (1901–1969), American baseball player
- Sylvester O. Rhem (1929–2007), African-American police officer and politician

== See also ==
- RHEM, video game
- Rhems, South Carolina
