= Anatok (Bardstown, Kentucky) =

Historic mansion in Kentucky

Coordinates: 37.8082°N 85.4717°W

- Location in Kentucky Location in the US
- Location: 309 W John Fitch Ave, Bardstown, Kentucky

History
- Built: 1847
- Built for: Charles Haydon
- Original use: plantation
- Demolished: 2022

Site notes
- Owner: Bethlehem High School (Archdiocese of Louisville)

Anatok was a historic mansion in central Bardstown, Kentucky. The two-story, double-pile, brick Greek Revival home was built in 1847 for Charles and Matilda Haydon.

The home had a limestone foundation, four brick interior end chimneys, and a standing seam hipped roof. It was named Anatok in the 1890s by then-owner James L. Druien.

In 1900, a one-story Colonial Revival wraparound porch, supported by Ionic columns, and a pedimented dormer were added.

The house was once home to Daniel Rudd, a prominent African-American Catholic journalist, was born into slavery on the plantation in 1854. In 1889, Rudd called together the first National Black Catholic Congress which was held at St. Augustine Catholic Church in Washington, D.C.

In the 21st century, as the property fell intro disrepair, preservationists sought to restore the property and avoid demolition. The Archdiocese of Louisville razed the property in February 2022.
