= Congregation of Divine Providence =

Several Roman Catholic religious institutes of women

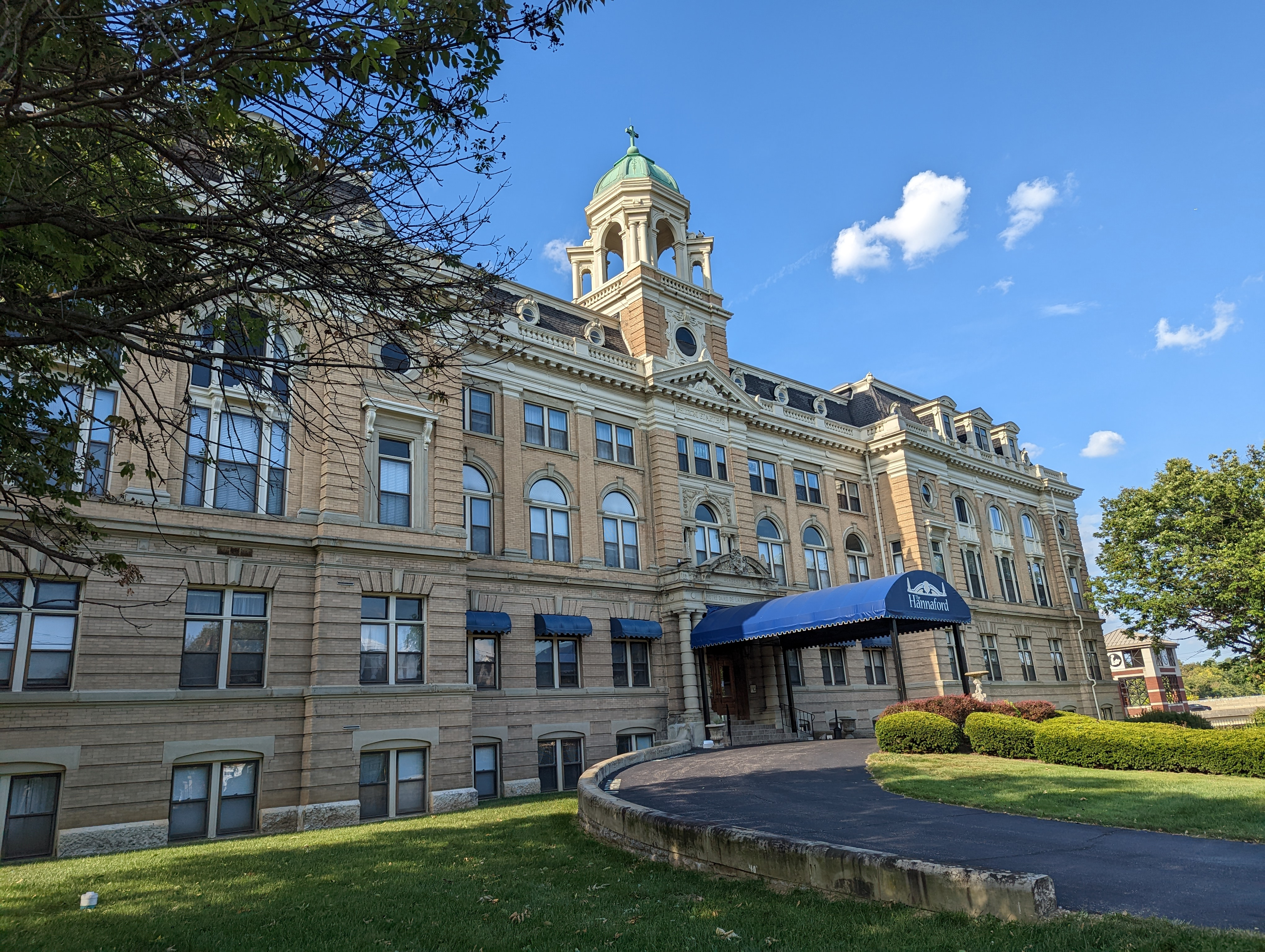
The Sisters of Divine Providence launched construction of this five-story brick Renaissance building on East Sixth Street in Newport, Kentucky, in 1890, opening in 1903, where the congregation taught a Christian-based curriculum. As of 2022, the building serves as a residential condominium complex.

The Congregation of Divine Providence (or Sisters of Divine Providence) is the name of several Roman Catholic religious institutes of women which have developed from the work of Jean-Martin Moye (1730-1793), a French Catholic priest. They are dedicated to the instruction and care of the neediest of the world. Started in 1762, it took its final form in 1852.

Moye saw the lack of educational opportunities for females in the rural sectors of his large parish in the Duchy of Lorraine, at that time an independent nation, speaking a form of the German language. The general motherhouse of the largest congregation is in Saint-Jean-de-Bassel, Moselle, France. The Sisters of this congregation serve on four continents. They all use the postnominal initials of C.D.P..

== History ==
=== Origins ===
Jean-Martin Moye was a parish priest in Lorraine, who was concerned about the lack of educational opportunities for young women and girls, and the general ignorance in the region about the faith, in the large parish for which he was responsible. He began to instruct several young women to combat this. On 14 January 1762, Moye sent out four literate women whom he had recruited, under the leadership of Marguerite LeComte, to teach in the remote hamlets of the region what was needed for the improvement of the peoples' lives, as well as for their practice of the Catholic faith. These women were to live alone and without provisions, like the first Christians, sharing in the daily labor of the local populace and trusting in God's divine providence to provide for their needs. Lecomte he stationed in the hamlet of Saint-Hubert where she served throughout the upheavals of the French Revolution.

Though pious, the women lacked any formal knowledge of teaching. Moye trained them in child psychology, in order to prepare them to teach effectively and in a Christian manner, instructing all those whom they met. They were instructed to provide special help to the less gifted and to the poor who had become distasteful to others from the situations of their lives. This innovative ministry by single women quickly came under criticism by some for this irregular behavior. In their first year of operation, the association was suppressed by the religious authorities. They did not, however, close the schools opened by the women, which immediately began to expand.

Moye initially gave the women the title of "Poor Sisters of the Child Jesus", but the villagers came to call them the "Poor Sisters of Providence".

Feeling called to preach the Gospel in the East, Moye joined the Paris Society for Foreign Missions and went to China to do missionary work in 1771, not returning to Lorraine until 1784 to oversee the new community. Before leaving, he put the care of the Sisters of Providence in the hands of two colleagues who were admirers of their work. He also appointed Marie Morel as their first Mother Superior. Driven into exile during the French Revolution, in 1793 he succumbed to typhus contracted while nursing fellow refugees. He was beatified by Pope Pius XII in 1954 and his feast day is celebrated on May 4.

=== Restoration and division ===
The French Revolution caused the closing of the schools of the congregation and scattered the Sisters. The loss of their founder and guide left them uncertain as to their future. When two priests returned to Lorraine from exile, they guided the surviving Sisters in re-forming the community in 1802. The German-speaking Sisters established a base in the town of Saint-Jean-de-Bassel in 1827, opening schools throughout Moselle and Alsace. The French-speaking Sisters were headquartered in Portieux, serving the Department of Vosges. The two groups separated into separate congregations in 1852.

=== Expansion ===
In 1866, the congregation expanded with a mission to the United States. In 1868 they sent a small group of Sisters to Algeria, who returned to France in 1871. During that period, they began to expand into new forms of service, opening a trade school for boys in Lixheim that same year, as well as ones to train girls in housekeeping. In 1879 Sisters began to serve in Belgium, and in 1889 a new mission was sent to the United States in Kentucky.

During World War II, Alsace was again made part of Germany, and the sisters faced the anti-Catholic regulations of the Nazi regime, under which their schools were closed. Many sisters fled to the part of the region under the government of Vichy France until the end of the war. A few, however, stayed and operated clandestine private schools at great personal risk.

After the war, a mission to Madagascar was established in 1950, in response to a request to staff a sanatorium there. The sisters began to serve in the French Department of Mayotte in the Pacific region, their first presence in a Muslim country. They served there until 1988. They expanded to Ecuador in 1982.

== Presence ==
At present, the Sisters of Divine Providence serve in Belgium, Comoros, Ecuador, France, Madagascar, Mali, Poland and the United States. They have served briefly in Algeria, Germany, Ghana and Romania.

The congregation was divided in 1999 into three provinces:

- The European Province, with its motherhouse in Saint Jean de Bassel, numbers about 400 sisters, serving in Belgium, France and Poland.
- The Madagascar Province currently numbers about 100 members, most of whom are native Malagasys.
- The American Province, established in 1889, is based in Melbourne, Kentucky, and has 115 sisters serving in the United States and Ecuador. It currently has 115 members.

== Legacy ==
Other congregations which trace their heritage to the work of Moye include:

=== Sisters of Providence of Portieux, France ===
The French-speaking Sisters of the original foundation, they continue to serve in that region as an autonomous congregation of diocesan right. To re-establish themselves after the turmoil of the Revolution, in 1802 these Sisters were able to open a novitiate in Portieux for new members. By 1824, they administered 24 institutions. Separating officially from the German-speaking branch in 1852, they received full ecclesiastical approval as an independent congregation in 1859.

By the 1870's, the congregation had expanded to 683 schools, including one in Rome, Italy. Mission schools began to be founded in Asia in 1874, first in China, then in modern-day Vietnam. During that period, they reached their height in membership, having 2,000 members of the congregation. In 1905, during the French Protectorate of Cambodia, these Sisters opened a mission in Battambang, where they operated a hospital and orphanage.

Today the Sisters of this congregation serve mainly in medical care and social service. They operate in Belgium, Cambodia, China, France, Italy, Ivory Coast, Japan, Philippines, Switzerland, Taiwan and Vietnam.

=== Sisters of Providence of Gap, France ===
The Sisters of Pontieux opened a school in 1823 in the Alpine village of Vitrolles in Southeastern France. There they found a large number of young women interested in joining their congregation. By 1838, the local Bishop of Gap determined that, given the distance of their region from the motherhouse of the congregation, he should have an independent community of Sisters teaching in the schools of his diocese and opened a novitiate in Gap to train candidates for a local community of Sisters of Providence who were to be under his authority.

The first group of Sisters in this new foundation took their vows in 1843, and the congregation received full ecclesiastical approval in 1855.

As of 2017, there were 570 Sisters serving on four continents.

=== Congregation of Divine Providence, Texas ===
The first overseas mission of the congregation was established in 1866 in the United States. The Sisters were recruited by Claude Dubuis, the Bishop of Galveston, Texas, to teach in the rural towns of his diocese. In answer to this call, Mother St. Andrew Feltin and Sister Alphonsa Boegler journeyed to Texas, landing in Galveston that year, arriving in San Antonio in December, where they opened their first school the following April. At the request of the bishop, they established a nearby city, Castroville as their headquarters. This was due to the large Alsatian population of that town. After much expansion, the motherhouse was later moved to San Antonio in 1895.

Under the leadership of Mother St. Andrew, the community opened dozens of schools, expanding their labors into Louisiana, where they opened schools which accepted black students, and on the Native American reservations.

This congregation has a province in Mexico. They operate Our Lady of the Lake University and Providence High School in San Antonio.

=== Missionary Catechists of Divine Providence ===
This community was founded in 1930 to meet the needs of the large Mexican-American population in Texas. They were founded by Sister Mary Benitia Vermeersch, C.D.P., who had recruited a small group of Hispanic young woman who wished to take this challenge. They determined that they wanted to live out this commitment as members of a religious institute. They received approval by the Holy See as a dependent congregation in 1946, becoming fully independent in 1989.

=== Sisters of Providence of Ruillé-sur-Loir, France ===
Another congregation which has a connection to this one is that of the Sisters of Providence of Ruillé-sur-Loir, France, founded in 1806, whose founder, Jacques-François Dujarié, adopted the Rule of Life and religious habit of this congregation.

An offshoot of the Ruillé-sur-Loir congregation is the American congregation of the Sisters of Providence of St. Mary of the Woods, based in Indiana, founded in 1840.

=== Sisters of Providence of the Institute of Charity ===
Similar to these two congregations, the Rule and habit of Providence were also adopted by the founder of the Sisters of Providence of the Institute of Charity, more commonly known as the Rosminian Sisters founded in Italy in 1832.

== Notable members ==
- Sister Mary Elaine Gentemann, an American composer.
- Sister Mary Benitia Vermeersch, C.D.P., foundress of the Missionary Catechists of Divine Providence.
