= James A. Spencer =

American politician (1850–1911)

James Alexander Spencer (October 23, 1850 – July 27, 1911) was an American state legislator and a leader in the Colored Catholic Congress. He represented Abbeville County, South Carolina in the South Carolina House of Representatives from 1874 to 1876.

== Biography ==
Spencer was born a free person on October 23, 1850, in Charleston, South Carolina, into a devout Catholic family. His father, James A. Spencer, was enslaved while his mother Ellen Blondeau was free.

Well educated, Spencer was a school teacher in Marion County. He was elected to the South Carolina House of Representatives representing Abbeyville County serving from 1874 to 1876. In 1877 he moved back to Charleston initially working as a porter until he became a messenger. He later worked as a clerk for the United States Lighthouse Engineers Office.

A member of St. Peter's Catholic Church in Charleston, a church created for black congregants in 1867, Spencer opposed segregation and believed the church should treat white and blacks equally. When he was denied membership in the Catholic Knights of America, he helped create a separate chapter for black church members. He also held several leadership positions in the Colored Catholic Congress and was chairman in 1893.

Spencer died on July 27, 1911 in Charleston.

== Personal life ==
Spencer married Ella Walton, with whom he had ten children.
