= Mary Elaine Gentemann =

American composer

Sister Mary Elaine Gentemann, CDP (October 4, 1909 – December 7, 2008) was an American religious sister and musical composer, a member of the religious order of the Sisters of Divine Providence. She is known for creating the first Mass integrating Negro Spirituals, "Mass in Honor of Blessed Martin de Porres" (1945).

== Personal life ==
Gentemann was born on October 4, 1909, in Fredericksburg, Texas. At age 19, she entered the religious order of the Sisters of Divine Providence becoming known as Sister Elaine. She received a Bachelor of Music from Our Lady of the Lake College in 1929 and a Master of Music from the American Conservatory of Music.

Later, she studied composition under Otto Luening, going on to study at the Juilliard School and the Teachers College, Columbia University. From 1929 to her retirement in 1999, she taught music courses at Our Lady of the Lake.

During this period, she composed a Mass integrating Negro Spirituals, entitled "Mass in Honor of Blessed Martin de Porres". Notably, this was 9 years before Our Lady of the Lake allowed Black students and 20 years before the Second Vatican Council would allow vernacular liturgy and modern music. She used the tune of "Nobody Knows the Trouble I've Seen" for the Kyrie. (The Mass would later play a major role in the development of Fr Clarence Rivers, a Black priest who would help popularize Black gospel music in the Catholic Church, especially Black parishes.)

Gentemann died on December 7, 2008, in San Antonio, Texas.

== Awards ==
In 1963 and 1968, Gentemann received the title of Composer of the Year by the Texas Music Teachers Association. In 1966 and 1968, she won two awards from the National Catholic Music Educators Association. The National Guild of Piano Teachers named her as a Composer of Distinction in 1967. Gentemann has entries in Who's Who in Music, Who's Who of American Women, Who's Who in the Southwest, Who's Who in Texas, and Who's Who in the International Dictionary of Biography.
