= Thomas Wyatt Turner =

American activist, botanist and educator (1877–1978)

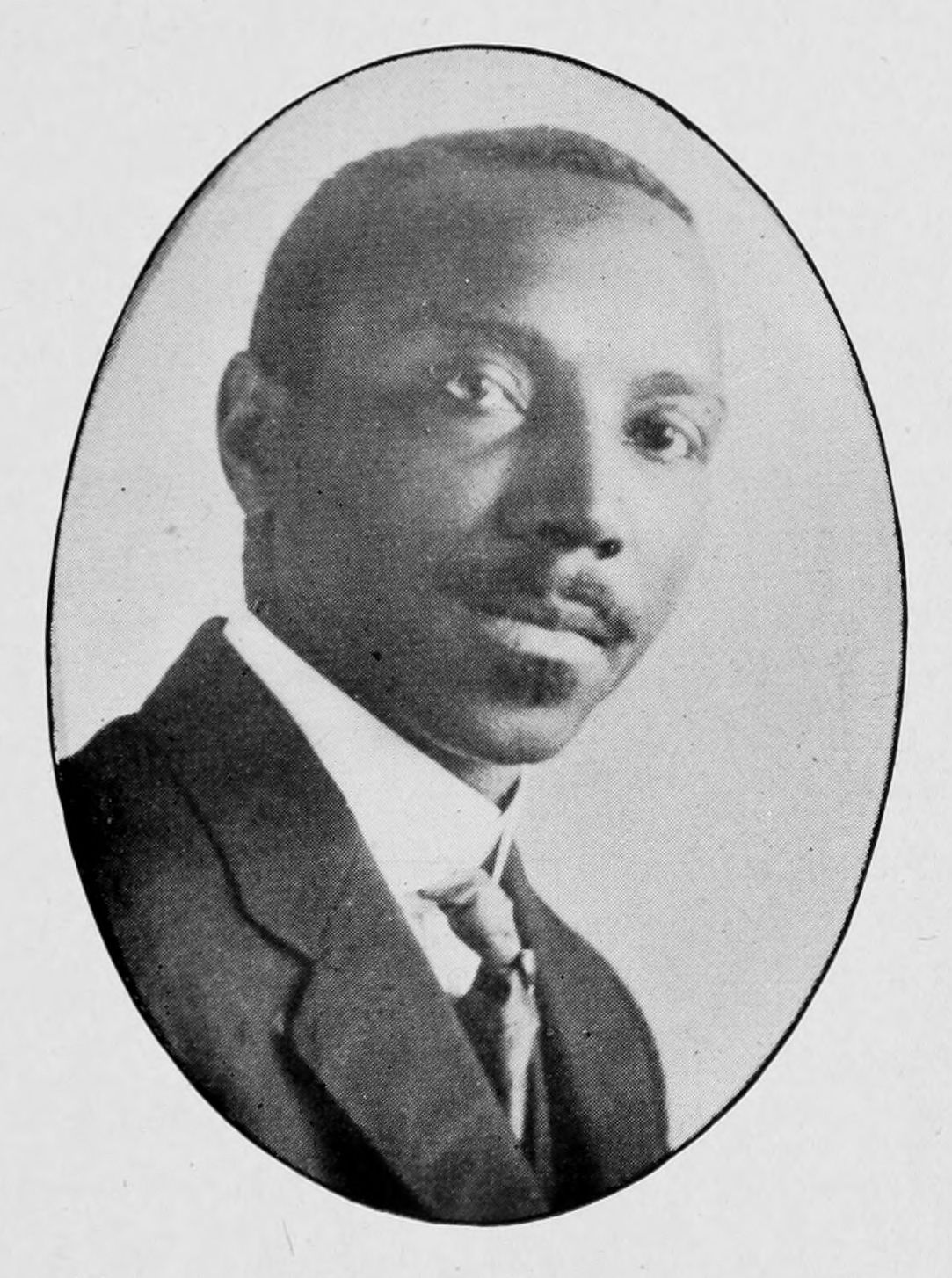
- Born: March 16, 1877; Hughesville, Maryland, United States
- Died: April 21, 1978 (aged 101)
- Education: Howard University (BS, MA); Cornell University (PhD)
- Occupation(s): College professor, botanist
- Known for: Founding member of NAACP; founding member and president of Federated Colored Catholics
- Spouse(s): Laura Miller Louise Wright (m. 1936)
- Parent(s): Eli Turner and Linnie Gross (Turner)

Thomas Wyatt Turner (March 16, 1877 – April 21, 1978) was an American civil rights activist, biologist, and educator. He was the first Black American to receive a Ph.D. in botany, and helped found both the NAACP and the Federated Colored Catholics.

== Biography ==
=== Early life and education ===
Turner was born in Hughesville, Maryland. His parents, Eli and Linnie (née Gross), were sharecroppers and he was the fifth of their nine children. When he was eight, his father died and he was sent to live with an aunt and uncle, James Henry and Rose Turner. Turner worked in the fields but also attended Episcopal local schools from 1892 onwards after Catholic schools refused to admit him because of his race. From 1895 to 1897, he attended the Howard University Preparatory School.

He studied at Howard University gaining B. S. (1901) and M. A. (1905) degrees. In 1901, he attended the Catholic University of America briefly to further improve his scientific knowledge but had to leave because it was too expensive. In 1921, he obtained a PhD in botany from Cornell University—becoming the first Black person to gain a doctorate from Cornell and the first to receive a doctorate in that field at any institution. His dissertation was entitled The physiological effects of salts in altering the ratio of top to root growth and came from work done with Otis Freeman Curtis during summer leaves-of-absence from his post as Dean at Howard University.

=== Career ===
After graduation, Turner headed to the Tuskegee Institute, Alabama at the request of Booker T. Washington, where he taught academics in biology for a year. From 1902 he gave service to various public schools in Baltimore, Maryland for a decade, except for a year (1910–1911) at the St Louis High School in St Louis, Missouri.

In 1909, he became a founding member of the National Association for the Advancement of Colored People (NAACP) as the first secretary of the Baltimore branch, and was also active in promoting the right of Blacks to vote. He continued this activism after his appointment to Howard University. In 1915 he organized a city–wide membership drive for the Washington NAACP. He was eventually honored with a lifetime membership in the NAACP.

From 1914 to 1924, he served as a Professor of Botany at Howard University in Washington, D.C., which had provided courses in botany since 1867. He was the founding head when the Department of Botany was established in 1922. He also served from 1914 to 1920 as Acting Dean at the Howard's School of Education. As well as biology he felt that the mentorship provided by teachers and faculty had a vital impact on student's careers. Turner was initiated as a member of Phi Beta Sigma fraternity in 1915.

In 1915, he began lobbying the Catholic University of America to admit Black students and for the Catholic church to provide high school education for Black Catholic children—as well as a route to the priesthood for young Black men who had a vocation (specifically via the Josephites). He would later become one of the Committee of Fifteen, which targeted such issues.

While working at Cornell University in 1918, Turner worked for the U.S. Department of Agriculture in Maine, where he examined potato fields. The American government consulted Turner throughout his career about agricultural problems. Under the auspices of the US Secretary of Agriculture, Turner worked as a collaborator on Virginia's plant diseases.

In 1924, Turner became a professor of botany and the department head at the Hampton Institute.

On December 29, 1924, Turner founded (and was elected president of) the Federated Colored Catholics, an organization that he said was "composed of Catholic Negroes who placed their services at the disposal of the Church for whatever good they were able to effect in the solution of the problems facing the group in Church and country". The FCC, founded to be a haven for Black Catholics and their goals/rights, would later disband due to two White co-leaders (and Jesuits) who sought a more interracial bent for the organization—against Turner's will.

In 1931, Turner organized the Virginia Conference of College Science Teachers in 1931, and served as president of that group for two terms. Turner also was an active member of the American Association for the Advancement of Science and of the American Society for Horticultural Science.

=== Later life and death ===
He retired in 1945 due to glaucoma.

In 1976, aged 99, Turner was awarded an honorary doctorate by The Catholic University of America.

He died in 1978, 36 days after turning 101.

== Personal life ==
His first wife was Laura Miller. In 1936, he married Louise Wright.

Turner was active in Catholic organizations and in societies for the advancement of African-Americans. He remained a loyal member of the Church despite suffering discrimination; he wrote of being asked to move to the back of the church when attending Mass in St. Louis in 1926.

== Legacy ==
His papers and unpublished autobiography were among the Turner Papers at the Moorland–Spingarn Research Center as of 1988. His memoir was published independently in 2018.

In 1976, the National Office for Black Catholics (NOBC) began awarding the annual Dr. Thomas Wyatt Turner Award for work towards equal rights.

In 1978, the Hampton Institute named its new natural sciences building Turner Hall.

The Cornell Graduate School created the Turner Kittrell Medal of Honor for alumni who have made significant national or international contributions to the advancement of diversity, inclusion and equity in academia, industry or the public sector. The first award was in 2017.

== Publications ==
- Turner, Thomas Wyatt (1922) Studies of the mechanism of the physiological effects of certain mineral salts in altering the ratio of top growth to root growth in seed plants. American Journal of Botany 9 (8) 415–445
- Turner, Thomas Wyatt (2018), edited Marilyn Nickels. From Sharecropper to Scientist: The Memoir of Thomas Wyatt Turner, Ph. D. (1877–1978). Independent posthumous publication. ISBN 9781717766212. 255 pages
