= Peter Claver Building =

Former hospital

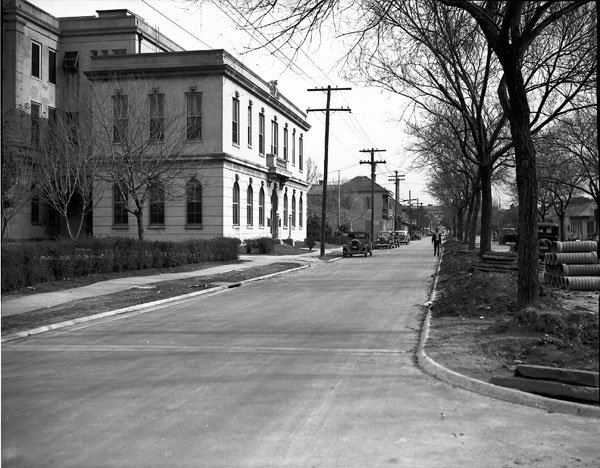
- The French Hospital on Orleans Avenue, 1937
- Location: 1818 Orleans Street; New Orleans, Louisiana
- Built: 1861
- Demolished: 1986

The Peter Claver Building, previously the French Hospital, was a historic building in New Orleans, Louisiana. It occupied the square bounded by Orleans, Derbigny, Ann Street, and Roman Streets, just back from Claiborne Avenue.

== History ==
=== Hospital ===
It was constructed in 1861 by La Société Française de Bienfaisance (French Benevolent and Mutual Aid Society of New Orleans), originally offering health care to the city's Francophone community. It became popularly known as "the French Hospital". The hospital closed on October 31, 1949. The building was subsequently rented out for offices.

It served as national headquarters of the Knights of Peter Claver organization during 1951 to 1974, when a new, adjacent building was constructed to serve as its headquarters instead.

The building was demolished in 1986.

== Architecture ==
The original building was constructed in the Greek Revival style in 1861, relatively late for applications of that style. It was further developed around 1883.

== Notable figures ==
- Lee Harvey Oswald, who assassinated U.S. President John F. Kennedy on November 22, 1963 in Dallas, Texas, was born at the French Hospital on October 18, 1939.
