= Sisters of Providence of the Institute of Charity =

Roman Catholic religious institute

The Sisters of Providence of the Institute of Charity, more commonly called the Rosminian Sisters of Providence, are a Roman Catholic religious institute for women founded in Italy in 1832.

== History ==
=== Foundation ===
The Sisters of Providence came into being through the work of the Blessed Antonio Rosmini-Serbati, a native of the County of Tyrol, and the Abbé Jean-Baptiste Löwenstein, a native of the region of Lorraine in France. Rosmini, who was ordained a Catholic priest in 1821, dedicated his life to submitting to the Divine Providence in undertaking any work he felt was presented which was a part of it. As part of this, he thought to form a religious community of men dedicated to this vision, which came to be called the Institute of Charity. He met Löwenbruck in June 1827, and was impressed by his desire to form a community of priests to evangelize the isolated communities of the mountains of that region. They set up a house in Domodossola, which they called Calvario (Calvary), from which Löwenbruck would travel through the Ossola valleys, preaching and teaching the people of the towns there.

In the course of his missionary travels, Löwenbruck encountered a large population of Walsers living in the Valley of Formazza, who spoke Walser German, a markedly different dialect from their neighbors, as a consequence of which they were unable to communicate easily with the local clergy for their spiritual needs. Due to his background, the French priest was able to, for which he was warmly welcomed by the people of the region. He then spent several months in providing them with the sacraments of the Church and educating them in their Catholic faith.

One thing which Löwenbruck found from his time among the people of that valley was a strong desire among many of its young women to offer themselves completely to the service of God. What they lacked was any means of education. In order to channel and direct this desire, he conceived of a plan to establish a religious institute to give them an outlet for their calling. He initially contacted some established religious institutes in that region. None would offer assistance in this project, however. Then he remembered that in his homeland of Lorraine he had known a flourishing group of Religious Sisters, called the Congregation of Divine Providence, founded by the Abbé Jean-Martin Moye in 1762, who were dedicated to the poor, especially through the education of their children. Wishing to find a place for all these young women as soon as possible, Loewenbruck turned to these French Sisters.

In 1830 Löwenbruck began corresponding with the Superior General of the congregation, the Abbé E. Feys, the pastor of the town of Portieux, where their motherhouse was located, requesting that some members of that congregation go to the Tyrol to initiate the work he envisioned. Feys initially demurred, suggesting that Löwenbruck set up his own structure locally. This, however, was beyond his authority and which went against his tendency to act out of obedience rather than initiating a work.

In November 1831, though, perhaps fearing another suppression of religious communities in France, Feys wrote to Löwenbruck to suggest that he send some Piedmontese girls to France to begin formation in the consecrated life from the established congregation. Löwenbruck responded enthusiastically, organizing a group of four girls to head to Portieux, who set out on 26 November. The journey lasted more than two weeks, as the women had to cross the Simplon Pass in the dead of winter, often walking barefoot for miles. Nevertheless, they arrived at the motherhouse and began training as postulants for the proposed community. After several months, Feys sent Löwenbruck glowing appraisals of these candidates.

=== First days ===
During 1832, while the Italian women were undergoing their formation in France, Löwenbruck set about securing a home for the new institute. In the course of the preaching tour, a local priest in Locarno, in Canton Ticino, suggested to him the availability of an abandoned hospital there, known as San Carlo, which he recommended that the local authorities transfer to him. Despite its wretched conditions, having no doors or windows, Löwensbruck accepted it and recruited another four women to start community life there.

The four women arrived in Locarno in March 1832 by ferry in the middle of a driving rain, but soon set up a routine of life similar to that of the Brothers of Charity, arising at 4:30 a.m. for prayers, followed by long days of work preparing the house to form their own novitiate, and of study in the rudiments of their faith, given to them by a local priest. They survived on donations collected by Löwenbruck in the course of his preaching tours. These were never sufficient to provide an adequate living, however, and they suffered from hunger and cold for months. On that 3 July 13 new candidates joined them, soon followed by the four women returning from France. They were accompanied by two French Sisters, not four as Löwenbruck as expected. These women had not been able to receive a religious habit and begin a canonical novitiate during their stay in France out of concern of stirring up problems with the French government authorities. Thus, as soon as the group crossed the border, they did so, receiving habits and religious names.

The Sisters then joined the community already organized at Locarno in Ticino, designed to be a novitiate as well as a school for the poor. The novitiate was formally opened on 31 July. Löwenbruck provided no funds, however, and though they opened a school, being but minimally educated they could get no salaries from the government as recognized teachers. Further complications was the isolation of the French Sisters, one of whom was still unable to speak Italian, and their consequent difficulty in preparing their Italian charges. Added to this was Löwenbruck's incompetence as a Director of the Sisters, making one mistake on his own after another, ignoring the advice of Rosmini. His mishandling of various matters even came to the attention of the local bishop. Rosmini tried to lead his disciple gently in taking these problems in hand, sending various priests to support him. Finally the French Sister Superior wrote to Rosmini to take action over the confusion of the house. By December 1832, even Löwenbruck acknowledged his inabilities and begged the founder of his own institute to assume responsibility.

This bad management finally induced Rosmini to intervene. He adapted the Rule written by a foundress with whom he worked, St. Maddalena di Canossa, to suit it to its new conditions, and thenceforward had to assume entire responsibility for the Sisters of Providence. He secured training programs for all the Sisters involved in education, so that, by the end of 1833, all teaching Sisters of the Institute were recognized by the local government. Thus they were from the first a distinct but integral part of the Institute of Charity, the "Rosminiane", as the Italians soon began to call them.

== Way of life ==
The Institute is mainly contemplative; but, when necessary, they undertake any charitable work suitable to women, especially the teaching of girls and young children, visiting the sick, and instructing in Christian doctrine. The central houses have smaller establishments emanating from and depending upon them. For each of these groups there is one Superior, elected by the professed Sisters for a term three years, and eligible for a second subsequent term. Aided by assistants, she appoints a procuratrix over each lesser establishment and assigns the grades and most of the offices.

In a custom begun in 1837, all the Sisters return to their central house every summer for a retreat and to hold a chapter for the election of officers.

The novitiate lasts three years; the usual three vows of poverty, chastity and obedience, are then taken, at first for three years, then either renewed or made perpetual.

== Expansion ==
Also by 1837, the Institute had expanded to establishing groups of Sisters in various cities throughout the region. Rosmini made the decision to move the motherhouse to Domodossola, occupying a former Ursuline monastery built around 1600. A novitiate and school for the education of teaching Sisters was then formed there. The Holy See, in its solemn approval of the Institute of Charity in 1839, gave an indirect recognition of the Sisters also, as adopted children of the Institute, at which time the first Sisters were allowed to make their religious profession on 3 November. From that time they have steadily increased.

In October 1843, two Rosminian Sisters were sent to England, to help at Our Lady's Convent School, a school established in Loughborough by Lady Mary Arundell (1787-1845), widow of James Arundell, 10th Baron Arundell of Wardour, and a convert to the Catholic Church, who had come to know the Fathers of Charity and its founder while traveling in Italy. Their first year was spent in prayer, the study of English and household duties. In this retired life they were joined by the first English postulants, who received their habits in 1844. That same year, on 25 March, they took charge of the first Catholic day school in England to be conducted by Religious Sisters.

In 1845, the Sisters began an evening school for the instruction of working girls. The Sisters in England did well, and, for a time, formed a separate institute from Italy, but later merged back with the mother group in Italy. Houses were also opened in Ireland and Wales.

The Sisters continued to grow in Italy as well. By the time of the death of the first Mother Superior, one of the young women to have gone to France, in 1879, the Institute numbered 500 living Sisters in 50 different communities around Europe. The Institute was established as a Congregation of Papal Right in 1946, at which time there were nearly 600 permanently professed Sisters, with another 200 candidates, in nearly 100 houses. In the mid-20th century, the Sisters began to establish communities outside of Europe. First was Tanzania (1955), followed by Venezuela (1966), Colombia (1989) and India (1991).
