= Missionary Catechists of Divine Providence =

The Missionary Catechists of Divine Providence are a religious institute of Catholic women founded in 1930 in the United States to serve the spiritual and social needs of the Mexican-American community there. They are engaged in religious ministry, in social service, and in diocesan and parish leadership positions in the Southwestern United States. They were the first religious congregation established to serve the needs of that population, and continue to do so through catechesis and social work among predominantly-Hispanic communities.

== History ==
During the course of the Mexican Revolution, soon followed by the Cristero War, thousands of citizens of that nation fled the violence of those conflicts in the United States, many settling in Texas. A local member of the Sisters of the Congregation of Divine Providence in Houston, Sister Mary Benitia Vermeersch, C.D.P. (1880–1975), saw the poverty of both the refugees and the long-established members of the Mexican-American population there. She organized a group of Hispanic girls in the 8th grade of the local parochial school where she was the principal, who were eager to teach catechism to public school children in their own language. She called them the Catechists of Divine Providence.

As the girls grew to an age where they could make a commitment to consecrated life, Vermeersch sought the approval of the group as a new religious community in the Catholic Church, committed to serving the Hispanic population where they were in most need. In 1934 the Bishop of Galveston, Christopher Edward Byrne, granted this approval. When her own congregation assigned her to San Antonio in 1938, Vermeersch continued her organization and recruitment for this community. She obtained a home to serve as the motherhouse of this new group.

Five of the Catechists entered the novitiate established for them there and the community was recognized as a religious congregation by the Holy See in 1946, dedicated to serving the Hispanic community, as a missionary branch of the Congregation of Divine Providence. As the Hispanic population of the nation expanded, the Sisters of this new congregation followed, serving in both the United States and Mexico.

The Missionary Catechists were approved as a fully autonomous religious congregation by Pope John Paul II on December 12, 1989.

== Current status ==
The Missionary Catechists continue their work primarily in Texas, California, Kansas, Nebraska and New Mexico.
