= Most Pure Heart of Mary Catholic Church =

Coordinates: 30.69598°N 88.05301°W

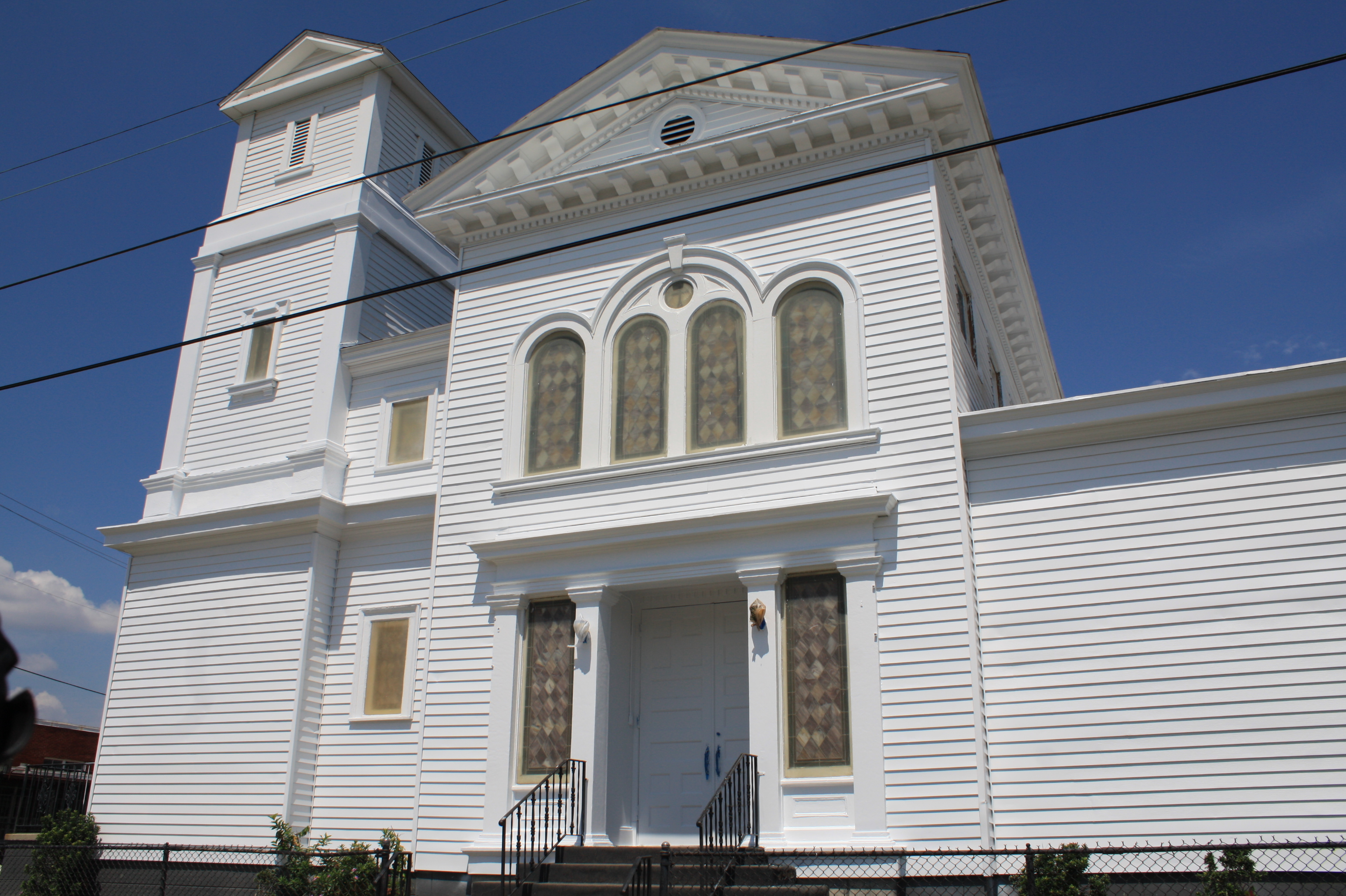
- The church in 2009
- Most Pure Heart of Mary Catholic Church
- Location: 304 Sengstak Street; Mobile, Alabama
- Country: United States
- Denomination: Roman Catholic
- Religious institute: Society of St. Joseph of the Sacred Heart
- Website: www.mobilearchdiocese.org

History
- Founded: 1899

Architecture
- Style: Neoclassical
- Years built: 1908

Administration
- Diocese: Roman Catholic Archdiocese of Mobile
- Parish: Most Pure Heart of Mary

Clergy
- Bishop: Archbishop Thomas John Rodi
- Pastor(s): Reverend Kenneth Ugwu, S.S.J.

Most Pure Heart of Mary Catholic Church is a historic Black Catholic church in Mobile, Alabama, administered by the Josephites. The Knights of Peter Claver, the largest and oldest Black Catholic organization in the United States, was founded by congregants and priests from the parish in 1909. Its clergy and congregation later took an active role in the Civil Rights Movement.

== History ==
Most Pure Heart of Mary Catholic Church was founded as a mission in 1899 by the Society of St. Joseph of the Sacred Heart to serve Mobile's Creoles of African descent. The first Josephite priests were Frs Joseph St. Laurent and Louis Pastorelli.

By 1901, a small school was established that continues into the present as Heart of Mary School. The school was first taught by the laity, until five Sisters of St. Francis arrived from Glen Riddle, Pennsylvania in October 1902 to take over. The church building was completed in 1908 and dedicated as Most Pure Heart of Mary in honor of the Blessed Virgin Mary.

The Knights of Peter Claver, the largest and oldest Black Catholic organization in the United States, was founded by congregants and priests from the parish in 1909.

During the Civil Rights era, priests and nuns from the parish participated in boycotts and demonstrations in support of the African-American community. The church served as a public meeting place for the Neighborhood Organized Workers (NOW) organization. NOW was established in Mobile in July 1966 with a mission focused on achieving equality for the African American community.

The church is listed on the African American Heritage Trail of Mobile.
