= Scott Winfield Bond =

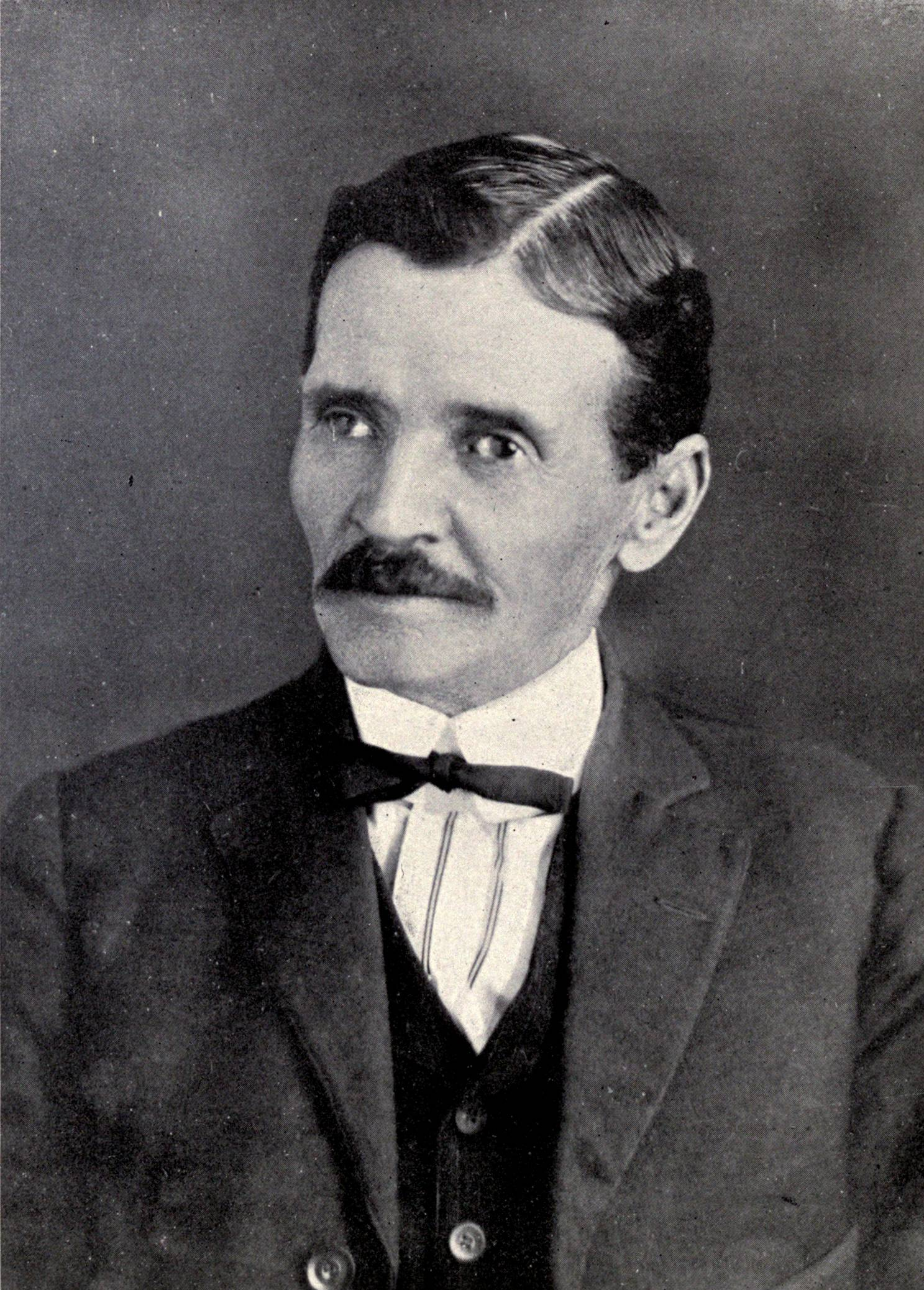
- Born: March 15, 1852; Livingston, Mississippi, US
- Died: March 24, 1933 (aged 81); Madison, Arkansas, US
- Burial place: Scott Bond Family Plot
- Occupation: Businessman

Scott Winfield Bond, also known as the "Black Rockefeller" (March 15, 1852 – March 24, 1933), was an African-American businessman in Arkansas known for his work in agricultural real estate, merchandising, and factory production in St. Francis County. Born into slavery, he eventually became the state's first Black millionaire, worth over $2M by the age of 60.

He was a member of Booker T. Washington's National Negro Business League, and his relationship with the Black Catholic journalist Daniel Rudd was also notable, as Rudd came to Arkansas to work for him later in life.

Bond died at the age of 81 in a farm accident, wherein he was gored to death by an ox.

== Personal life ==
He was married to Magnolia Nash and had 11 sons: Waverly, Theophilus, Raphe, Scott Jr., John, Herman, Buford, Cody, Odie, Ulysses, and Leander.

After Bond's death, Theophilus would team with Daniel Rudd to write his biography, From Slavery to Wealth.

== Scott Bond Burial Plot ==
Bond's family burial plot was listed on the National Register of Historic Places in 2002.
