= Humani generis unitas =

Encyclical drafted before the death of Pope Pius XI in 1939

Humani generis unitas (Latin; English translation: On the Unity of the Human Race) was a draft for an encyclical planned by Pope Pius XI before his death on February 10, 1939. The draft text condemned antisemitism, racism and the persecution of Jews. Because it was never issued, it is sometimes referred to as "The Hidden Encyclical" or "The Lost Encyclical". Humani generis unitas was written by three Jesuits under the leadership of John LaFarge. The draft text remained secret until published in 1995 in France (by Passelecq and Suchecky under the title L’Encyclique Cachée de Pie XI) and in 1997 in English as The Hidden Encyclical of Pius XI.

== History ==
In June 1938, Pius XI assigned American Jesuit John LaFarge to prepare a draft of Humani generis unitas. Jesuit Superior-General Wlodimir Ledóchowski assigned two other Jesuits, Gustav Gundlach and Gustave Desbuquois, to assist LaFarge. Working in Paris, they produced a draft of approximately 100 pages. Another Jesuit translated the draft into Latin and presented it to Ledóchowski. The draft was delivered to the Vatican in September 1938.

Some secondary sources, including Cardinal Tisserant, claim that the draft was on Pius XI's desk when he died of a heart attack on February 10, 1939.

Pius XI's successor, Pope Pius XII, did not promulgate the draft as an encyclical. Critics of Pius XII (notably John Cornwell in his controversial work Hitler's Pope) cited this decision as evidence of his alleged silence toward anti-Semitism and The Holocaust. He utilized parts of it in his own inaugural encyclical Summi Pontificatus on the unity of human society, in October 1939, the month after the outbreak of World War II, and analysis of the draft figures prominently in most comparisons of the policies of Pius XII and his predecessor.

In June 2006, Pope Benedict XVI ordered all documents from the reign of Pius XI in the Vatican Secret Archives to be opened, and on September 18, 2006 over 30,000 documents were made available to researchers.

== Content ==
The first 70 paragraphs, probably authored by Gundlach, are a critique of theological modernism, unorthodox re-interpretation of Sacred Scripture, ultra- nationalism, and racism; the remaining 108, likely authored by all three Jesuits, contextualized the first part of the text with the social role of Catholic educational institutions and anti-Semitism.

Although the draft clearly condemned racism and anti-Semitism, the document is deeply grounded in anti-Judaism. The draft criticizes the majority of post-Messianic Jews for not acknowledging Jesus Christ as the true Jewish Messiah.

=== Racism ===
Humani generis unitas clearly condemns American racial segregation and racism and Nazi German anti-Semitism, though without explicitly naming these countries. Racism is a denial of the unity of human society, a denial of the human personality, and a denial of the true values of religion. There is no relation between race and religion, because racism is destructive to any society. Racism is destructive not only for social relations within a society but also for international relations and relations between different races.

=== Persecution of Jews ===
The draft condemns the persecution of Jews: “persecutions everywhere carried out against the Jews since antiquity… have been censured by the Holy See on more than one occasion, but especially when they have worn the mantle of Christianity." It identifies specific ways Jews were being persecuted at the time of writing:

- millions of persons are deprived of the most elementary rights and privileges of citizens in the very land of their birth. Denied legal protection against violence and robbery, exposed to every form of insult and public degradation, innocent persons are treated as criminals though they have scrupulously obeyed the law of their native land. Even those who in time of war fought bravely for their country are treated as traitors, and the children of those who laid down their lives in their country's behalf are branded as outlaws by the very fact of their parentage… In the case of the Jews, this flagrant denial of human rights sends many thousands of helpless persons out over the face of the earth without any resources.

=== Anti-Judaic context ===
But the text hedges with an anti-Judaic theme. “This unjust and pitiless campaign against the Jews has at least this advantage”, according to the draft, "because the true nature, the authentic basis of the social separation of the Jews from the rest of humanity … is religious in character. Essentially, the so-called Jewish question … is a question of religion and, since the coming of Christ, a question of Christianity." The encyclical blames the Jews of the time of Christ for having brought their own Messiah Jesus Christ to death: "The very act by which the Jewish people put to death their Savior and King was, in the strong language of Saint Paul, the salvation of the world." The draft continues by accusing Jews of blind materialism.

- Blinded by a vision of material domination and gain, the Israelites lost what they themselves had sought. A few chosen souls, among whom were the disciples and followers of Our Lord, the early Jewish Christians, and, through the centuries, a few members of the Jewish people, were an exception to this general rule. By their acceptance of Christ's teaching and their incorporation into His Church, they shared in the inheritance of His glory, but they remained and still remain an exception. "What Israel was seeking after, that it has not obtained; but the chosen have obtained it, and the rest have been blinded" (Romans 11:7).
- By a mysterious Providence of God, this unhappy people, destroyers of their own nation, whose misguided leaders had called down upon their own heads a Divine malediction, doomed, as it were, to perpetually wander over the face of the earth, were nonetheless never allowed to perish, but have been preserved through the ages into our own time. No natural reason appears to be forthcoming to explain this age-long persistence, this indestructible coherence of the Jewish people.

== Reaction of Pope Pius XII ==
According to the authors, Pius XII was not aware of the text before the death of his predecessor. He chose not to publish its specific statements regarding Judaism and regarding persecution of Jews. However, his first encyclical Summi Pontificatus (On the Supreme Pontificate, October 12, 1939), published after the beginning of World War II, has an echo of the previous title in its title: On the Unity of Human Society and uses many of the general arguments of the text.

Summi Pontificatus sees Christianity as universalized and opposed to every form of racial hostility and every claim of racial superiority. There are no racial differences which destroys the unity of mankind: the human race forms a unity, because "God 'hath made of one [man], all mankind, to dwell upon the whole face of the earth.'"

- What a wonderful vision, which makes us contemplate the human race in the unity of its origin in God... in the unity of its nature, composed equally in all men of a material body and a spiritual soul; in the unity of its immediate end and its mission in the world; in the unity of its dwelling, the earth, whose benefits all men, by right of nature, may use to sustain and develop life; in the unity of its supernatural end: God himself, to whom all ought to tend; in the unity of the means for attaining this end... in the unity of the redemption wrought by Christ for all.

This law of solidarity and charity assures that all men are brethren, without excluding the variety of persons, cultures, and societies.
