= Scott Bond Family Plot =

Historic cemetery in Arkansas, United States

- U.S. National Register of Historic Places
- Location within Arkansas Location within the United States
- Location: 0.3 W of 5th St. on US 70, Madison, Arkansas
- Coordinates: 35°0′45″N 90°43′53″W
- Area: less than one acre
- Built: 1933
- Architectural style: Cemetery
- MPS: Ethnic and Racial Minority Settlement of the Arkansas Delta MPS
- NRHP reference No.: 02000603
- Added to NRHP: June 6, 2002

The Scott Bond Family Plot is a historic family burial plot in Madison, Arkansas, United States. It contains the burial site of Scott Bond, Arkansas' first Black millionaire.

Born into slavery, Bond became a major landowner and businessman in St. Francis County, and at age 60 his personal net worth was estimated to exceed $2 million. He died at age 81, gored to death by an ox on his farm.

== Description ==
It is located 0.3 miles (0.48 km) west of 5th Street on U.S. Highway 70. The plot measures 16 by 75 feet (4.9 m × 22.9 m), and consists of two markers surrounded by a low concrete border.

== NHRP listing ==
The site was listed on the National Register of Historic Places in 2002.

== See also ==
- National Register of Historic Places listings in St. Francis County, Arkansas
