= Emanuel A. Romero =

Jamaican-American writer for interracial justice (1887 – 1960)

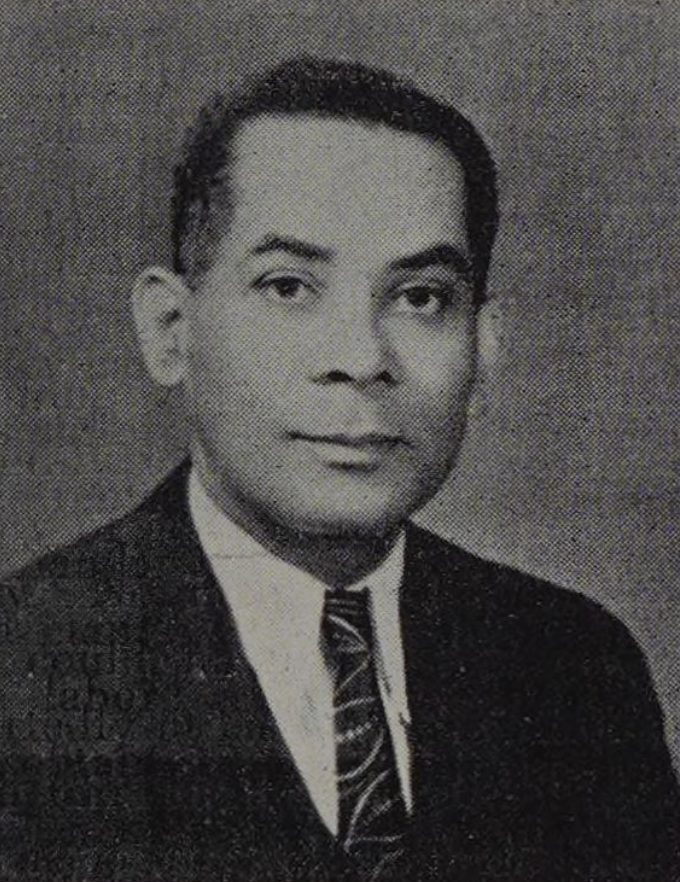
- Born: February 21, 1887; Kingston, Jamaica, B.W.I.
- Died: December 8, 1960 (aged 73)
- Occupations: Lecturer, writer, advocate for interracial justice in the Roman Catholic church
- Spouse: Minnett Ennever (m. 1919)
- Children: 4

Emanuel A. Romero Sr. (February 21, 1887 – December 8, 1960) was a Jamaican-American writer and speaker who was a prominent voice for racial justice from a Black Catholic perspective in the 1930s and 40s. He wrote for publications such as The Catholic Interracialist and The Interracial Review and he led both the Catholic Interracial Council and a majority-Black organization known as the Catholic Laymen's Union. He spent 47 years as an administrator at the ecumenical Protestant Union Theological Seminary, where he was remembered by students as having "a deeper understanding of our faith than most Protestant professionals."

== Early life and education ==
Emanuel Augustus Romero was born in Kingston, Jamaica when it was the British West Indies, on February 21, 1887, the son of a Haitian mother, Marie Hewitt Romero (? – 1924), and a Spanish father, Manuel Francisco Romero (1869 – 1893). He had a sister, Isadora. He attended parochial school in Kingston, and graduated from St. George's College before moving to New York in 1903 or 1906. Over the next years he attended business school at night in what was then known as the New York City Evening Schools (1825-1935), moving on to Columbia University's extension program, and then Fordham University, as well as studying law by correspondence course with Philadelphia's LaSalle University.

== Career ==
He began his career clerking at the American Consular Service. He then worked for the Lee & Fleischer law firm until it laid off much of its staff during a financial crisis known as the Panic of 1907. He then joined Union Theological Seminary later in 1907 at its Park Avenue location, running the Hastings Hall office, and working for 47 years until his retirement in May, 1954. He served in the Army during World War I, winning a commission at Camp Pike, rising to First Lieutenant, and afterward continuing in the Officers' Reserve Corps. In 1942 he registered for the World War II draft at age 55, but was not called up.

After WWI he was named "special organizer for colored troops" by the War Camp Community Service. There he organized activities for Black youth such as boys' clubs and Boy Scout troops. He also oversaw sports for Black adults such as tennis and swimming, in what was then a highly segregated society. In 1922 his name appears on the letterhead as adjutant for the Colonel Charles Young Post 398 of the American Legion of Harlem, named for the first Black man to achieve the rank of colonel in the Army.

== Catholic lay leadership ==
He was president of the Catholic Laymen's Union founded by John La Farge SJ in 1928, and vice president of the Catholic Interracial Council, also founded by La Farge in 1934. In 1950 at St. Patrick's Cathedral, Cardinal Spellman presented him with a papal award from Pope Pius XII, Pro Ecclesia Et Pontifice, for his work on interracial dialogue and justice. He was president of the Society of St. Vincent de Paul for his parish. He was also a recipient of the Silver Beaver, the highest award in scouting.

As a lecturer he spoke at universities and other organizations on equality in the Catholic church, and his work was covered frequently, especially by the Black press.

== Personal life ==
Romero married the Jamaican-born Minnett Esemine Ennever (1890-1969) in 1919. They had four children: two daughters, Consuelo and Regina, and two sons, Lloyd, and Emanuel Jr. (Manuel or Manny), who became a prominent figure in the Urban League. As of 1954 Romero had seven grandchildren. Emanuel A. Romero died at age 73 on December 8, 1960, at St. Luke's Hospital in New York.
