= Clarence Rivers =

American composer and Catholic priest (1931–2004)

The Reverend Father Clarence Rivers
- Church: Latin Church

Orders
- Ordination: 1956 by Karl Joseph Alter

Personal details
- Born: Clarence Rufus Rivers Jr. September 9, 1931 Selma, Alabama, U.S.
- Died: November 21, 2004 (aged 73)
- Denomination: Catholic Church
- Occupation: Liturgist; author
- Education: Xavier University; Yale University

Clarence Rufus Joseph Rivers Jr. (September 9, 1931 – November 21, 2004) was an American Black Catholic priest and well-known liturgist. His work combined Catholic worship with Black Gospel music, making him an integral part of the Black Catholic Movement. He also wrote several books on music and spirituality.

== Biography ==
=== Early life and education ===
Clarence Rufus Rivers Jr. was born in Selma, Alabama, to Clarence Rufus Rivers Sr. and Lorraine (Echols) Rivers, with his family moving to Cincinnati when he was young. He became Catholic as a young child in Catholic grade school, eventually taking "Joseph" as his confirmation name. It was in Cincinnati that he began study for priesthood, becoming the first black man to be ordained for the archdiocese. He did graduate work at Xavier and Yale universities, as well as the Catholic University of America and the Catholic University of Paris. He eventually earned a PhD in African-American culture and Catholic liturgy from the Union Institute in 1978.

=== Priesthood and artistic career ===
Rivers was ordained to the priesthood in 1956 by Archbishop Karl J. Alter. He was the first African American ordained in the Archdiocese of Cincinnati.

Early after his ordination, he worked at St. Joseph Church, a historically black parish in Cincinnati's West End neighborhood. He was also an English teacher at Purcell Marian High School in the East Walnut Hills neighborhood of Cincinnati.

He began to gain notoriety for his music during the Civil Rights Movement, beginning with his "An American Mass Program", which combined Gregorian Chant with the melodic patterns and rhythms of Negro Spirituals. (He was influenced in this tradition by Sister Mary Elaine Gentemann, who had composed such a Mass in 1945.)

Rivers' most beloved hymn was "God Is Love", which he first performed at the first official Mass in English in the United States after the Second Vatican Council (which had opened the door in canon law for vernacular Mass rather than Latin). The song was used as the Communion Hymn during the Mass, which was held during the 1964 National Liturgical Conference in St. Louis. It received a 10-minute standing ovation.

In 1965, Rivers formed a corporation named “Stimuli Incorporated” so that he could “share his gift of Blackness” with other Catholics. Cincinnati based designer David Camele was his primary partner in virtually every visual representation of Rivers' work. Camele designed very musical octavo, every book and journal, and original vestments, including Rivers' "Black Spirit Dove" that later became the basis for a set of episcopal pectoral crosses created for all the African American bishops in the 70s and 80s.

Rivers collaborated with many musicians to arrange his music like Edward Stanton Cottle, William Foster McDaniel, Henry Papale, Frank Porto, and Rawn Harbor. Harbor became a longtime collaborator and friend following in Rivers' footsteps as a full time pastoral liturgist. Rivers was responsible for backing young Grayson Warren Brown's musical career, by producing his first album under Stimuli, Inc. Much of Rivers' life's work culminated acting as chief liturgist for the Black Heritage Mass at the 1976 International Eucharistic Congress in Philadelphia, PA. Cardinal Maurice Otunga, Archbishop of Nairobi, Kenya presided and then Auxiliary Bishop Eugene A. Marino of Washington, DC preaching a ghostwritten homily written by Father Rivers.

He became the founding director of the National Office for Black Catholics' Office of Culture and Worship during the Black Catholic Movement, and there organized various conferences and workshops in addition to spearheading the NOBC's cultural journal, "Freeing the Spirit" (a motif Rivers would re-use in various other contexts, including as the title of a short memoir). During this time, he added to his team one Robert Ray, penman of the "Gospel Mass" choral setting sung by choirs worldwide ever since.

Rivers received the North American Academy of Liturgy's prestigious Berakah Award in 2002, an association of which he had been a founding member.

=== Death ===
He died unexpectedly at the age of 73 on Sunday, November 21, 2004, the Solemnity of Christ the King.

== Legacy ==
Rivers was passionate about the drama of public worship, as well as the music that was the "soul" of worship. He was equally devoted to African American culture and was known for his lavish vestments and distinctive jewelry.

He was a composer and a vocalist. It was his personal faith and belief in the liturgy as a place where one encountered God that motivated all of his work.
