= Catholic Association for International Peace =

Catholic peace organization

The Catholic Association for International Peace was founded in 1927 by John A. Ryan. It based its opposition to war on the traditional just war doctrine.

It joined other religious organizations in urging a halt to the bombing of North and South Vietnam.

== See also ==
- List of anti-war organizations
