= Mason Brown House =

- U.S. National Register of Historic Places
- Location within Kentucky Location within the United States
- Nearest city: Gratz, Kentucky
- Coordinates: 38°25′52″N 84°56′28″W
- Area: less than one acre
- Built: 1856
- Built by: Cook, Nathaniel Center
- Architectural style: Gothic Revival
- NRHP reference No.: 98000325
- Added to NRHP: April 27, 1998

The Mason Brown House, in Owen County, Kentucky, United States, was built in 1856. It was listed on the National Register of Historic Places in 1998.

It is located in a remote river bottom, 0.5 miles (0.80 km) east of the end of Brown's Bottom Road, within a loop of the Kentucky River.

It is a 46 by 32 feet (14.0 m × 9.8 m) plan two-and-a-half-story balloon frame house. It has "deeply scrolled" bargeboards which were cut from large planks of yellow poplar.
