= Colored Catholic Congress =

Defunct African-American Catholic organization

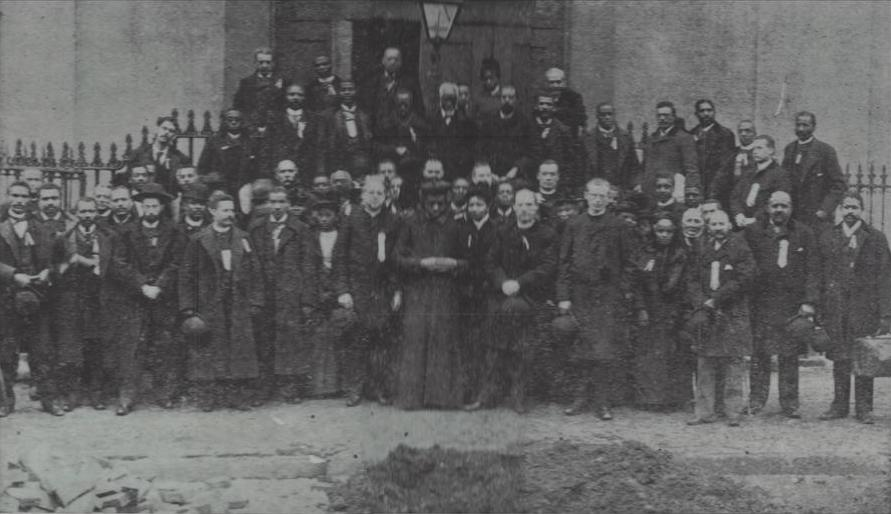
- Formation: 1889
- Founder: Daniel Rudd
- Dissolved: 1894
- Purpose: Advocacy
- Region served: United States
- Members: Black Catholic regional delegates
- Main organ: Conference

The Colored Catholic Congress movement was a series of meetings organized by Daniel Rudd in the late 19th and early 20th centuries for African-American Catholics to discuss issues affecting their communities, churches, and other institutions.

== History ==
Part of the Colored Conventions Movement, the congresses began in 1889 at the behest of Daniel Rudd, an observant activist and journalist who watched and interacted with various organizations, discussing matters unique to the respective organizations.

In particular, Rudd watched the workings of the German Roman Catholic Central Verein. In September 1887, Rudd attended a gathering in Chicago to address the group. Upon his return, he complained about the fact that the German and Irish were organized, but African Americans were not. He thought to gather Black Catholics to discuss various troubles in the Black community.

He built the idea of an English-speaking Catholic congress in the hope that all races would attend. Before the call, Rudd explained that those looking for freedom must first be the ones to “strike a blow”. He believed that the way to win the Black population to the Catholic church was to “find out how many Catholics we would have to start with and then put that force to work”.

In May 1888, Rudd called upon Black Catholics all over the country under the “Blessing of Holy Mother Church.” It was believed that this group could serve as a “leaven” of the race, lifting all African Americans both in the eyes of God and in humanity. It was well known that Rudd's advocacy reached farther than simple equality and justice but went beyond to national issues and problems such as legal segregation, equality for women, lynching, discrimination, employment, labor strife, and public-school segregation. He wanted to include all the injustices facing people of color everywhere, but specifically Africa and Latin America.

The Colored Catholic Congress held its first meeting in Washington, D.C., in January 1889, where Augustus Tolton, the nation's first openly-Black Catholic priest, celebrated Mass, and the 200-strong group met with President Grover Cleveland. The Congress met for five more years before disbanding for unknown reasons.

=== Revival ===
The movement was revived in the late 20th century as the National Black Catholic Congress, under the leadership of several national Black Catholic organizations and the first NBCC president, Bishop John Ricard, SSJ.

== Notable participants ==
- Daniel Rudd
- Fr Augustus Tolton
- Fr Charles Uncles, SSJ
- Fredrick McGhee
- William Edgar Easton
- Fr John R. Slattery, SSJ
- James A. Spencer
