= Sylvester O. Rhem =

American police officer and politician

Sylvester O'Neal Rhem (November 19, 1929 – June 14, 2007) was an African-American police officer and politician in Illinois.

Rhem was born in Chicago, Illinois and went to the Chicago public schools. He graduated from Englewood High School in 1948. He received his bachelor's degree in public administration from DePaul University.

He then worked as a police officer for the Chicago Police Department before serving in the Illinois House of Representatives from 1981 to 1985 as a Democrat.

== Personal life ==
Rhem was Catholic and a member of the Knights of Peter Claver.
