= James W. Alcorn House =

- U.S. National Register of Historic Places
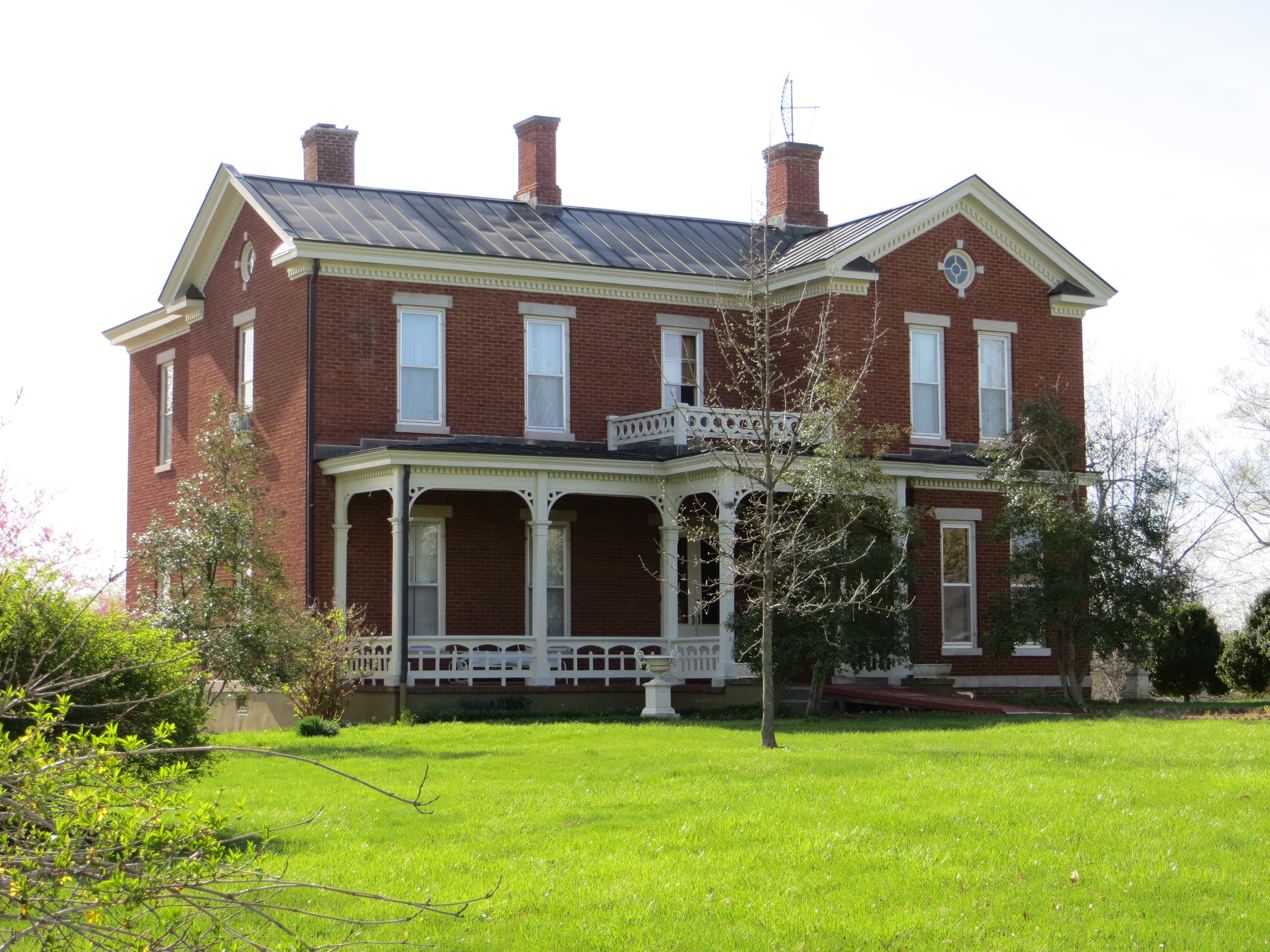

- Location within Kentucky Location within the United States
- Location: 409 Danville Ave., Stanford, Kentucky
- Coordinates: 37°31′58″N 84°40′09″W
- Area: 2 acres (0.81 ha)
- Built: 1885
- NRHP reference No.: 80001649
- Added to NRHP: April 22, 1980

The James W. Alcorn House, in Stanford, Kentucky, was built in 1885. It was listed on the National Register of Historic Places in 1980.

It is located at 409 Danville Ave. in Stanford. The listing included six contributing buildings.

It is a two-story, brick T-plan house. Five frame outbuildings are included in the listing. It has also been known as The Hickories at St. Asaph's.

The house was home of James W. Alcorn, who served as a Confederate officer in the American Civil War and who later "gained regional recognition as a successful attorney during the latter half of the 1800s."
