= Ridgeway, Kentucky =

Unincorporated community in Kentucky, United States

Coordinates: 36°53′51″N 83°07′32″W

Ridgeway is an unincorporated community in Harlan County, in the U.S. state of Kentucky.

== History ==
A post office called Ridgeway was established in 1925, and remained in operation until 1932. The community took its name from the Ridgeway Coal Company.
