= National Office for Black Catholics =

US organization of Black Catholics

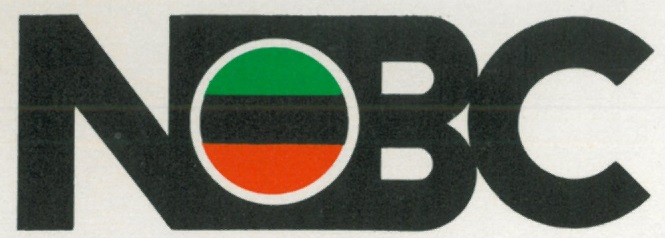
- Abbreviation: NOBC
- Formation: 1970; 56 years ago
- Founder: Joseph M. Davis, SM (among others)
- Dissolved: 1987; 39 years ago

The National Office for Black Catholics (NOBC) was an organization of Black Catholics in the United States, founded in 1970 and headquartered in Washington, DC. Its mission was "to make the Church relevant to the needs of the black community; to assist generally in the black liberation movement; to assist black Catholics in their efforts to become self-determining; and to become an effective voice in the whole of Church government."

It was officially dissolved in 1987, but certain leaders claim to have continued the work until at least 2007.

== History ==
The NOBC was founded in 1970, as an umbrella group for the National Black Catholic Clergy Caucus (NBCCC), the National Black Sisters Conference (NBSC), and the National Black Lay Catholic Caucus (NBLCC). Funding for the NOBC came primarily from an annual collection taken at Catholic churches around the country, called "Black Catholics Concerned."

NOBC undertook a variety of programs in the 1970s and 1980s. Its major departments included the Office of Culture and Worship, Office of Evangelization, Department of Church Vocations, and Education Department.

The organization's work included promoting black clerical leadership, supporting the development of African-rooted liturgy and ministries, contributing to the revitalization of black parishes, and strengthening black Catholic education. The organization also worked with the American Catholic hierarchy to bring issues around race to the forefront and participated in the 1976 "Call to Action" conference held by the U.S. bishops.

NOBC sponsored many conferences and events throughout the 1970s and 1980s. Among its most successful events was a regular conference on African American Culture and Worship (AACW) led by Fr Clarence Rivers.

Beginning in 1980, it also hosted a biennial conference for the organization's members. 2,000 delegates attended the first gathering, developing a plan to petition the Vatican to allow for married Black clergy and a national Black seminary.

In 1988 and 1989, NOBC and NBLCC hosted two Lay Leadership symposiums in Belleville, Illinois. The Office of Evangelization also sponsored revival events throughout the country.

Tension over the mission and organizational structure of the organization led to the formal withdrawal of the NBSC and NBCCC from NOBC in the early 1980s. (One incident is said to have involved a fistfight between members of the lay caucus and NBSC, over the former's unwillingness to cede leadership positions.)

The NOBC's publications included its newsletter, Impact!, as well as Freeing the Spirit, a journal of the Office of Culture and Worship (headed by Fr Clarence Rivers). Freeing the Spirit ceased publication in 1983, but Impact! continued sporadic publication through the 1980s. A professional concert and album, also called Freeing the Spirit, was produced in Detroit in 1971, with acclaimed gospel musician Edwin Hawkins, the Hawkins Family, and many other nationally respected black musicians.

Although NOBC leaders like Walter Hubbard claim to have continued its activity through the 1990s and early 2000s, other sources say it ceased operations in 1987 in favor of the National Black Catholic Congress, founded that year, and/or the National Association of Black Catholic Administrators.

== Executive directors ==
- Br. Joseph Davis, SM (1970–1977)
- Fr. Cyprian Lamar Rowe, SSF (1978–1980)
- James Henderson (1981–1987)
- Penelope Taylor Powell (1978 [acting director], 1987–1988)
- Walter Hubbard (1988 – c. 2000)

== See also ==
- Federated Colored Catholics
- National Black Catholic Congress
