= National Black Catholic Congress =

Black Catholic advocacy group

- Abbreviation: NBCC
- Formation: 1987
- Legal status: nonprofit
- Headquarters: Baltimore, Maryland
- Region served: United States
- Members: Black Catholic regional delegates
- President: Bishop Roy Edward Campbell
- Executive Director: Valerie Washington, OCDS
- Executive Assistant: Kimberley Hefner
- Board of directors: Sr Josita Colbert, SNDdeN; Bro Cursey Calais, SSJ; Bishop Fernand J. Cheri III, OFM; Pam Harris (others)
- Main organ: Quinquennial conference
- Affiliations: National Association of Black Catholic Administrators National Association of Black Catholic Deacons National Black Seminarians Association National Black Sisters' Conference National Black Catholic Clergy Caucus
- Website: nbccongress.org

The National Black Catholic Congress (NBCC) is a Black Catholic advocacy group and quinquennial conference in the United States. It is a spiritual successor to Daniel Rudd's Colored Catholic Congress movement of the late 19th and early 20th century.

It was founded in 1987 by the National Association of Black Catholic Administrators (NABCA), the National Black Catholic Clergy Caucus (NBCCC), and the National Black Sisters Conference (NBSC). Bishop John Ricard, SSJ served as NBCC president from its founding until 2017.

Its mission is to improve and enrich the lives of African-American Catholics, operating in close cooperation and coordination with the Black Bishops of the United States Conference of Catholic Bishops (USCCB) and receiving funding from the Black and Indian Mission Collection.

Six NBCC congresses have been held as of 2021, occurring every five years (though delayed one year recently, to 2023, due to the COVID-19 pandemic).

== History ==
=== Background ===
The historical precedent for the Congress emerged from the Colored Catholic Congress that took place on January 1–4, 1889. The National Black Catholic Congress was founded by Daniel Rudd, a Black Catholic journalist and activist from Kentucky (though based elsewhere throughout his life). His movement lasted only a few years before folding for unknown reasons.

During the Black Catholic Movement of the late 60s to early 90s, the National Office for Black Catholics (NOBC) emerged. Leadership disputes foiled the lay caucus, however, and the NOBC eventually folded as well, giving way to NABCA, an organization made up of all the African-American diocesan front office professionals in the US.

=== Founding ===
NABCA proposed a revived Congress in the late 80s, after which they brought in the NBCCC and NBSC for further planning.

The first meeting was held in 1987, and featured a series of inculturated "Gospel Masses", an African-American form of the Catholic Mass that had emerged in recent decades as part of the Black Catholic Movement. They also developed a pastoral plan, which was to inform and govern Black ministry in dioceses around the country.

=== Subsequent gatherings ===
The Congress convened every five years after the inaugural gathering, and in the 1990s funded the construction of the Our Mother of Africa Chapel in the Basilica of the National Shrine of the Immaculate Conception in Washington, DC.

==== 21st century ====
In 2017, Bishop Roy E. Campbell was elected president of the NBCC, succeeding Ricard.

In March 2021, the NBCC announced that due to the COVID-19 pandemic, the 2022 gathering would be pushed to 2023.

== Pastoral Plan ==
One of the main purposes of the inaugural gathering was to discuss and finalize a Pastoral Plan for the Black Catholic community, to be distributed to the country's dioceses and implemented by parishes, priests and bishops nationwide.

Similar documents have been developed at each successive meeting of the Congress. The latest was formulated at the gathering in 2017.

== Notable participants ==
- Servant of God Thea Bowman, who provided various liturgical programs for the first Congress. She died in 1990, two years before the second gathering.
- Sister Francesca Thompson, who gave an address at the 1987 gathering, parts of which have appeared in multiple NBCC documentaries since.
- The initial crop of Black bishops in the United States, including—among others—NBCC president John Ricard, SSJ, now-Cardinal Wilton Gregory, Joseph Francis, SVD, Eugene Marino, SSJ, Emerson Moore, and James Lyke, OFM.

== Programs ==
- The National Black Catholic Congress Convocation – an event providing guidance to black clergy on how to best preach and minister to the African-American community.
- Lay Leaders Training Workshops – providing understanding on how to reach Black lapsed Catholics on a regional scale.
- Catholic High School Consortium Program – in which leaders create plans to help member Catholic schools with a significant (75%) Black population best serve their constituency and the larger communities.
- NBCC Newsletter – an email newsletter published quarterly, with noteworthy information impacting the Black Catholic community.
- Webinars – the Congress regularly hosts webinars on various topics of concern to the Black community.

== In popular media ==
The inaugural Congress was covered in a documentary produced by the Congress, as were subsequent gatherings in a later piece.

== See also ==
- Black Catholicism
- Federated Colored Catholics
- Black church
- Knights of Peter Claver
