= German Roman Catholic Central Verein of North America =

Catholic organization in North America

The German Roman Catholic Central Verein of North America, now known as the Catholic Central Verein (Union) of America, is a central body of various German Roman Catholic organizations in North America.

The organization was founded on April 15, 1855, as a federation of parish mutual aid societies. Although the German Catholic community had a strong reputation for conservatism, the Verein had taken the lead, by 1900, as the most reform-oriented of American Catholic societies, under the leadership of Nicholas Gonner of Milwaukee (1890–1903) and Frederick P. Kenkel (1908–1952).

Today, its headquarters are located in St. Louis, Missouri, and its primary mission is the publication of the Social Justice Review, a journal founded in 1908 to promote Christian humanism with respect for the dignity and rights of all human beings. The current president is Michael J. Cross, a native of St. Louis, who obtained his M.A. in Theology and Religious Studies at the Catholic University of Louvain in Belgium.

== Founding ==
The Catholic Central Verein of America was founded in 1855 as the German Roman Catholic Central Society of North America (Deutscher Römisch-Katholischer Central-Verein von Nord-Amerika). It began as a central alliance of German Catholic organizations from all over the United States that was established at a founding Convention in Baltimore, Maryland. Annual conventions have been held in cities around the country since 1855. It is the oldest association of Catholic men's societies in the United States and the first Catholic organization in the United States to acknowledge the existence of the Social Question and a pioneer in its study and the promotion of Catholic Social Action. It is also the first Catholic organization to take part in the struggle for Catholic private schools.

== Publications ==
In 1908, the Central Bureau was established in St. Louis, Missouri, to co-ordinate the activities of the Central Verein.

The same year, a monthly magazine, the Central-Blatt and Social Justice, began to be published in St. Louis. Its first editor was Dr. Frederick Philip Kenkel, who had been editor of the German-language Amerika in St. Louis. The journal was intended to promote Christian humanism, with respect for the dignity and rights of all human beings. The Social Justice Review was published bimonthly until 2016, under the editorship of the directors of the Central Bureau with Fr. John H. Miller, C.S.C. bringing the publication to over 10,000 readers.

The philosophical roots of the journal and its parent organization are to be located in the German Romantic tradition of such thinkers as Johann Josef von Görres (1776–1848), as well as in the solidarist economics of the Jesuit Heinrich Pesch (1854–1926). Pesch's ideas were highly influential in the background of Pope Pius XI's famous social encyclical, Quadragesimo Anno, and in later papal documents. GK Chesterton and Hilaire Belloc's distributist economic theories have also been well received by the writers who appear in Social Justice Review.

== Central Bureau ==
Since 1908, the Central Bureau is the headquarters of the Catholic Central Verein of America and is located at 3835 Westminster Place near Saint Louis University. Under its first director, Dr. Frederik Philip Kenkel (1908–1952), the St Elizabeth Settlement and Day Nursery was founded. Rev. Msgr. Victor T. Suren (1952–1962), the Bureau's second director, established the microfilming apostolate which today has up to 1,100,000 frames of microfilm. Harvey Johnson was the third director of the Central Bureau. The Rev. John H. Miller, C.S.C., author of several books, including "Curing World Poverty", served as the fourth director until his death in 2006. The Bureau's fourth director was Fr. Edward Krause, C.S.C. The current director is Michael Cross of St Louis, Missouri.

== Activities ==
The purpose of the Central Verein has always been the promotion of Catholic practice, Christian virtue, and works of charity; spreading the knowledge and love of God; and helping to effect a Christian reconstruction of society that is based on the principles of the great papal social encyclicals of the 19th century and later. Among the noteworthy achievements of the Central Verein have been its successful support of laws enabling credit unions, establishing workmen's compensation, and permitting public school buses to transport Catholic schoolchildren.

During and after the Second World War, the Central Bureau of the Central Verein served until the 1950s as the official agency of the Archdiocese of St. Louis for resettling refugees and displaced persons from Europe and other places. In more recent years, the Central Bureau has conducted humanitarian aid work in Central America.

No longer a specifically-German society, the Central Verein and its Central Bureau have adapted their outlook and activities for the good of people of all ethnic backgrounds. The decline in membership of German ethnic organizations in the United States has left the publication of the Social Justice Review as the Central Bureau's main activity.

It also maintains a library at its headquarters in St. Louis, mainly devoted to the social sciences and German-Americana, publications in German in the United States. In the 21st century, most of the annual meetings of the Central Verein have been held at the Central Bureau.

== Presidents ==
- Anton Blattau (1855–1856)
- Franz Haeffner (1856–1857)
- J. P. Buch (1857–1858)
- Christian Wieckmann (1858–1860)
- John Amend (1860–1868)
- Joseph Philipps (1868–1872)
- George Baldus (1872–1873)
- H. J. Spaunhorst (1873–1891)
- Adolph Weber (1891–1895)
- Nikolaus E Gonner (1895–1903)
- John B. Oelkers (1903–1911)
- Joseph Frey (1911–1919)
- Michael F. Girten, Esq (1919–1921)
- Charles Korz (1921–1928)
- Willibald Eibner (1928–1933)
- John Eibeck (1933–1936)
- Frank C. Blied (1936–1938)
- William H. Siefen (1938–1944)
- J. M. Aretz (1944–1946)
- Albert J. Sattler (1946–1955)
- Frank C. Gittinger (1955–1960)
- Richard F. Hemmerlein (1960–1971)
- Joseph H. Gervais (1971–1975)
- Timothy A. Mitchell (1975–2002)
- Peter J. McNulty (2002–2011)
- Michael J. Cross (2011–present)

== Directors of the Central Bureau of the CCVA ==
- Dr. Frederik Philip Kenkel (1908–1952)
- Rev. Msgr. Victor T. Suren (1952–1962)
- Harvey Johnson (1962–1986)
- Fr. John H. Miller, C.S.C. (1986–2006)
- Fr. Edward Krause, C.S.C. (2006–2025)
- Michael J. Cross (2025–present)

== Sources ==
- Brophy, Mary Liguori. The Social Thought of the German Roman Catholic Central Verein (Washington, DC, 1941)
- Gleason, Philip. The conservative reformers: German-American Catholics and the social order (1968).
- Gleason, Philip. "An Immigrant Group's Interest in Progressive Reform: The Case of the German-American Catholics," American Historical Review (1967) 73#2 pp. 367–379 in JSTOR
- "Catholic Central Union". New Catholic Encyclopedia, (Washington, D. C.: Catholic University of America, 1967), Vol. III, pp. 265–7.
- Sister Mary Liguori Brophy, B.V.M., A.M., LL.B., The Social Thought of the German Roman Catholic Central Verein [Ph.D. dissertation, Catholic University of America](Washington, D. C.: Catholic University of America Press, 1941), p. 70 n.
