= Daniel Rudd =

Black Catholic journalist and activist

Daniel Arthur Rudd
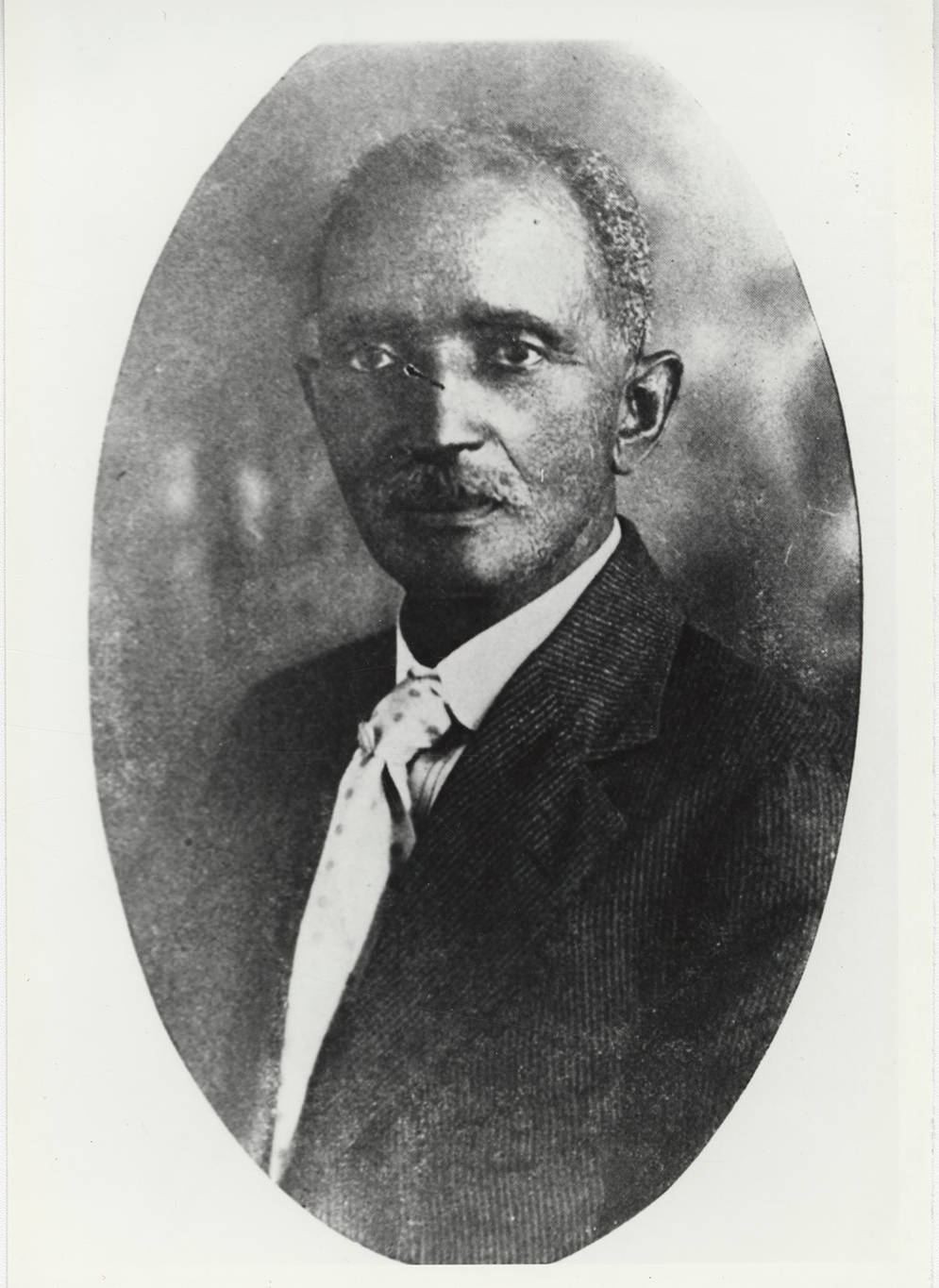
- Born: August 7, 1854; Bardstown, Kentucky
- Died: December 3, 1933 (aged 79); Bardstown, Kentucky
- Burial place: St. Joseph Cemetery, Bardstown, Kentucky
- Monuments: Historical markers at St. Joseph Cemetery in Bardstown and St. Raphael's Catholic Church in Springfield, Ohio
- Occupations: Journalist, activist
- Employer: Scott Bond
- Organization(s): American Catholic Tribune, Colored Catholic Congress
- Movement: Colored Conventions Movement, proto-Black Catholic Movement
- Parent(s): Robert and Elizabeth Rudd

Daniel Arthur Rudd (August 7, 1854—December 3, 1933) was a Black Catholic journalist and early Civil Rights leader.

He is known for starting in 1885 what has been called "the first newspaper printed by and for Black Americans", the Ohio Tribune—which he later expanded into the American Catholic Tribune, purported to be the first Black-owned national newspaper. The paper folded in 1897.

He also founded the Colored Catholic Congress in 1889, which held five meetings total and lasted until 1894.

== Biography ==
=== Early life ===
Daniel Rudd was born on August 7, 1854, on Anatok Plantation in Bardstown, Kentucky to enslaved parents Robert and Elizabeth Rudd. Daniel and all 11 of his siblings were baptized in the Catholic Church.

Rudd was very religious, but it is unknown at what point in his life he decided to make the promotion of Catholicism his life's work. He was eventually emancipated from slavery and moved to Springfield, Ohio while still a young adult, sometime before 1876.

At the time, anti-Catholicism and political nativism were rampant, causing American Catholics to be physically threatened by Protestants with acts such as the burning of churches and convents. This led Rudd to decide to speak out on public schools in Springfield, as his fellow Catholics did not agree with the Protestant methods that were being used in them—which Catholics believed were insufficient to deal with the “materialism and formal unbelief” facing American youth.

In addition, Rudd helped desegregate Springfield public schools, advocating alongside the city's Black community beginning in 1881.

=== Career ===
Rudd's journalism career started at the Sunday News. While there, he was a printer, reporter, and editor who was interested in following a Frederick Douglass-like advocacy that was aimed at protecting the civil rights of African Americans. He believed that the press played a large role in Black advancement. Rudd also thought that editors and journalists had the ability to persuade and educate Catholic, business and civic leaders.

==== Newspaper owner ====
In 1885 Rudd began his first Catholic newspaper called the Ohio Tribune, the first Black paper printed by and for the Black community. The fledgling, local weekly—with a limited scope—did not do well.

After only a year, Daniel moved the company to Cincinnati, where he started featuring articles that spoke out on Black issues such as segregation and discrimination. This new iteration, the American Catholic Tribune; this was the first Black-owned and operated national Catholic newspaper.

Rudd believed that the newspaper was important in promoting the church as a transformational institution that was capable of bringing equality and social justice for African Americans.

“The Catholic Church alone can break the color line. Our people should help her to do it.” (American Catholic Tribune)

Cardinal Gibbons, archbishop of Baltimore (the preeminent episcopal see in the nation at the time), the archbishops of Cincinnati and Philadelphia, and the bishops of Covington, Columbus, Richmond, Vincennes, and Wilmington, were all listed on the masthead of the Tribune as endorsers.

Rudd was also a skilled businessman who knew how to reach out and teach those who were like-minded and wanted to push for the same changes in civil rights that he did, such as Black Catholics and Protestants. In order for Rudd to make the changes he wanted, he needed income, which he gained by using the Tribune to promote his own printing school. This allowed him to expand his own business with printing, and start creating custom cards, letterheads, envelopes, invoices, pamphlets, books, legal documents, and advertisements.

That wasn't the only source of his income though; he also had newspaper subscriptions from Catholic and Protestant readers in Northern and Midwestern states. African Americans saw his will to make a change and fight for something they've believed in for quite some time, and as a result many bishops, monsignors, laypersons, and even more Protestants gave him financial aid.

In 1891, he collaborated with Ida B. Wells and her Memphis Free Speech, alongside the Detroit Plaindealer, in hiring a correspondent to investigate the conditions of African Americans in the former Confederacy.

Rudd was successful for quite some time in his printing business, and by 1892, Rudd's newspaper was printing 10,000 copies. His successes led the Afro-American Press League (a consortium of the roughly two hundred Black newspapers being published in the country at the time) to ask Rudd to serve as its president. The enterprising Rudd served in this capacity even as he worked to keep his Queen City printing business and printing school afloat.

==== Colored Catholic Congress ====
Rudd was very observant activist, watching and interacting with various organizations, discussing matters unique to the respective organizations. In particular, Rudd watched the workings of the German Roman Catholic Central Verein. In September 1887, Rudd attended a gathering in Chicago to address the group. Upon his return, he complained about the fact that the German and Irish were organized, but African Americans were not. He thought to gather Black Catholics to discuss various troubles in the Black community.

He built the idea of an English-speaking Catholic congress in the hope that all races would attend. Before the call, Rudd explained that those looking for freedom must first be the ones to “strike a blow”. He believed that the way to win the Black population to the Catholic church was to “find out how many Catholics we would have to start with and then put that force to work”.

In May 1888, Rudd called upon Black Catholics all over the country under the “Blessing of Holy Mother Church.” It was believed that this group could serve as a “leaven” of the race, lifting all African Americans both in the eyes of God and in humanity. It was well known that Rudd's advocacy reached farther than simple equality and justice but went beyond to national issues and problems such as legal segregation, equality for women, lynching, discrimination, employment, labor strife, and public-school segregation. He wanted to include all the injustices facing people of color everywhere, but specifically Africa and Latin America.

The Colored Catholic Congress held its first meeting in Washington, D.C. in January 1889, where Venerable Father Augustus Tolton, the nation's first openly-Black priest, celebrated Mass, and the 200-strong group met with President Grover Cleveland. The Congress met for five more years before disbanding. (An organization with a similar name and focus was founded in 1987.)

==== Collapse of the Tribune ====
In 1897, there was a collapse of the Tribune due to the economic recession and increased competition from other businesses in the newspaper industry in Cincinnati and Philadelphia, as well as new Black Catholic papers in other parts of the country.

==== Later career ====
By the end of his journalism career, Rudd had gone through many personal changes and found it best if he moved to the South and sought work in Mississippi and Arkansas. Rudd also may have been attracted to the South because of the economic opportunities that had opened up, allowing Black people to get cheap land. He worked in Bolivar County, Mississippi, as a lumber mill manager, and eventually he went to work for Scott Bond, Arkansas' first Black millionaire.

Rudd later found himself working as a business manager, accountant, inventor, and teacher. After a while, Rudd started to notice that the movement toward equality for African Americans was moving at a very slow pace, prompting him to accept Booker T. Washington’s self-help philosophy. That philosophy emphasized creating and building up businesses instead of the faith and churches, to achieve maximum economic advancement toward growth and change. That philosophy of self-help did not last very long after Rudd was invited to and participated at the NAACP convention in Cleveland in 1919.

=== Death ===
In 1932 Rudd suffered a stroke, after which his family brought him back to his childhood home. He died there on December 3, 1933, at the age of 79.

He is buried in St. Joseph's Cemetery, adjacent to Rudd's childhood parish of the same name (now the Basilica of Saint Joseph Proto-Cathedral).

== Personal life ==
Many Catholic clergy and Rudd's close friends always described him as highly intelligent, a great businessman, and fluent in several languages, but one key thing that apparently stuck out about Rudd was his unbreakable faith in his Catholic upbringing and roots.

== Legacy and honors ==
Rudd remains a vaunted figure in the history of Black Catholicism, and is highly honored among its adherents as well as in the larger American Church.

In Fall 2020, Rudd's childhood parish—in conjunction with the Archdiocese of Louisville—announced plans to unveil a memorial historical marker at his gravesite on All Saints' Day of that same year, commemorating his impact on American Catholicism and the larger United States.

== Bibliography ==
- Agee, Gary. A Cry for Justice: Daniel Rudd and his Life in Black Catholicism, Journalism and Activism, 1854-1933. Fayetteville: University of Arkansas Press, 2011.
- Agee, Gary. Daniel Rudd: Calling a Church to Justice. Collegeville, Minnesota: Liturgical Press, 2017.
- Davis, Cyprian. The History of Black Catholics in the United States. New York: Crossroads Publication Co., 1990.
- Rudd, Daniel. Three Catholic Afro-American Congresses.(New York: Arno Press, Inc., 1978)
- “Daniel Rudd: A Pioneering Leader in Black Catholic Journalism.” Crux, 23 Feb. 2019, cruxnow.com/church-in-the-usa/2019/02/23/daniel-rudd-a-pioneering-leader-in-Black-catholic-journalism/.
- Agee, Gary B. (2017). Daniel Rudd: Calling a Church to Justice. Liturgical Press. ISBN 978-0-8146-4698-4. Project MUSE 56076.
- Green, Paul E. (1 October 2014). "Gary B. Agee, A Cry for Justice: Daniel Rudd and His Life in Black Catholicism, Journalism, and Activism, 1854–1933 . Fayetteville: The University of Arkansas Press, 2011. Pp. 236. Cloth $39.95". The Journal of African American History. 99 (4): 462–464. doi:10.5323/jafriamerhist.99.4.0462.
- BGSU Libraries: EBSCO (Daniel Rudd)
