= Charles Uncles =

American Catholic priest (1859–1933)

The Reverend Charles Uncles SSJ
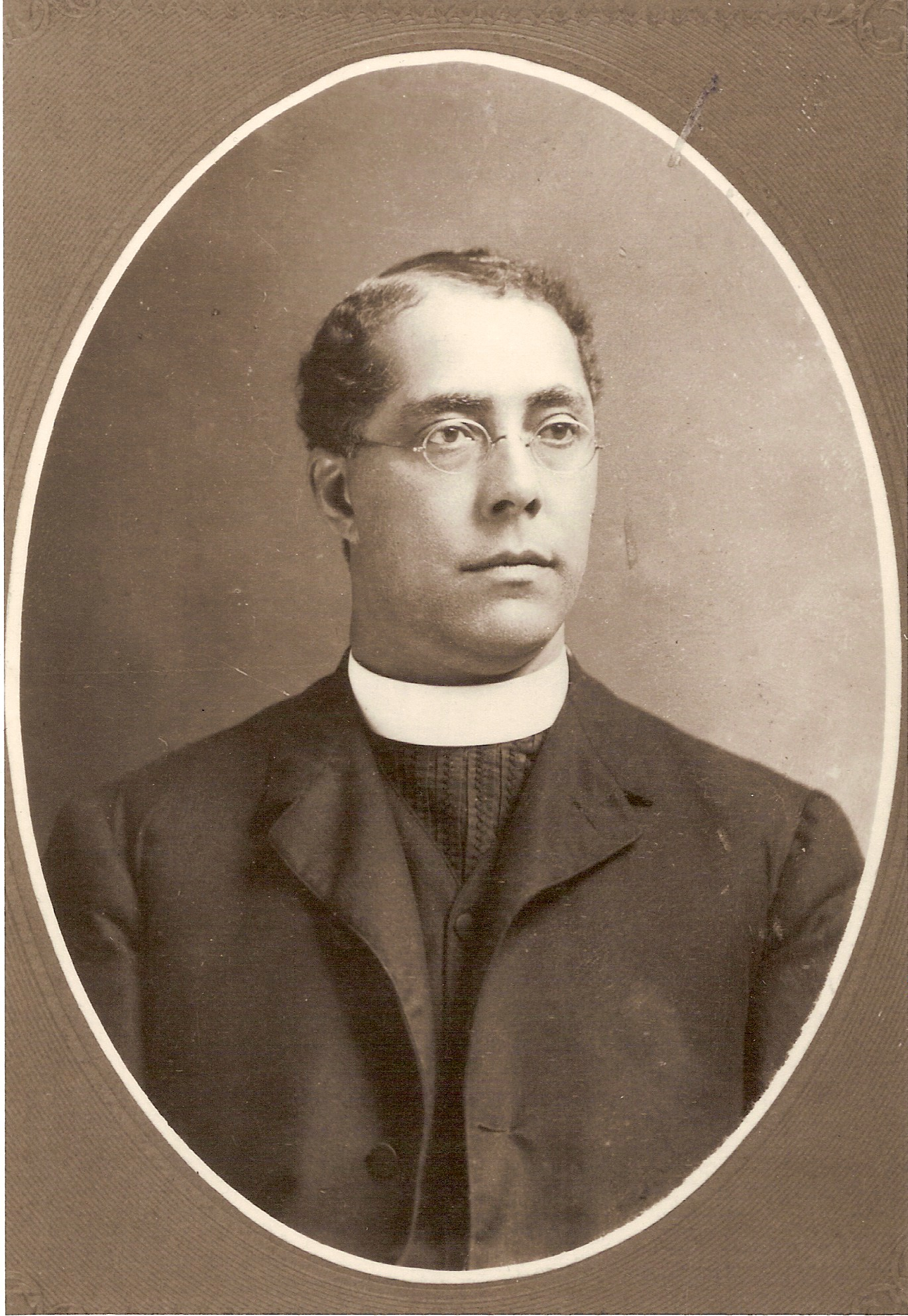
- Church: Catholic Church

Orders
- Ordination: December 19, 1891 by James Gibbons

Personal details
- Born: November 6, 1859 Baltimore, Maryland, U.S.
- Died: July 21, 1933 (aged 73) New Windsor, New York, U.S.

Charles Randolph Uncles SSJ (November 6, 1859 – July 21, 1933) was the first Black Catholic priest ordained in the United States. Born in Baltimore to free parents, he was ordained in 1891 and co-founded the Society of Saint Joseph of the Sacred Heart, also known as the Josephites. He spent his entire priestly career as a professor at Epiphany Apostolic College.

== Early life ==
Charles Randolph Uncles was born on November 6, 1859, in Baltimore, Maryland. He was the son of Lorenzo and Anna Marie (née Buchanan) Uncles, both of whom had been born free. His father worked for the Baltimore and Ohio Railroad and his mother was a dressmaker. His family were parishioners at St. Francis Xavier Church, the first Black Catholic parish in the United States, where Charles was baptized in 1875 and confirmed in 1878.

Uncles received his early education at a private school in Baltimore conducted by William Augustine Williams, a former seminarian. He later attended the Baltimore Normal School for Colored Teachers, while working as a journalist and a typesetter at a printing house to pay for his education. From 1880 to 1883, he taught at public schools in Baltimore County.

As a member of St. Francis Xavier Church, Uncles became acquainted with the Mill Hill Missionaries, who ran the church. One of the Mill Hill Fathers, Rev. John R. Slattery, helped Uncles discern a call to the priesthood and personally paid for his education at Saint-Hyacinthe Seminary in Quebec, which Uncles entered in 1883. His decision to study for the priesthood was strongly opposed by his parents, who relied on Charles for financial support. In 1886, Slattery asked Rev. Denis J. O'Connell, the rector of the Pontifical North American College in Rome, to see if the Pontifical Urban College would allow Uncles to complete his studies there. However, seminarians at the Urban College needed to be sponsored by a bishop and Uncles had been unable to find a sponsor. Thus, Uncles remained at Saint-Hyacinthe for two more years.

In 1888, Uncles returned to Baltimore, where Slattery had established St. Joseph's Seminary. Prior to the opening of the seminary, Slattery asked Rev. Alphonse Magnien, president of the nearby St. Mary's Seminary, if Uncles could attend classes at St. Mary's until St. Joseph's was completed. Magnien submitted the matter to the student body of St. Mary's, who unanimously voted to accept Uncles. When St. Joseph's opened in September 1888, Uncles was one of the first four students.

== Priesthood ==
On December 19, 1891, Uncles was ordained a priest by Cardinal James Gibbons at the Baltimore Cathedral. He thus became the first Black Catholic priest ordained in the United States. All previous Black Catholic priests, such as James Augustine Healy and Augustus Tolton, had been ordained in Europe.

Uncles celebrated his first Mass on the following Christmas Day at his home parish of St. Francis Xavier Church. Reporting on the Mass, the Baltimore Afro-American wrote, "Never before at such an hour had such a crowd been out in the street with Catholics mustering in force; and perhaps never before such music and such a blaze of light and such lavish ornamentation of the altars surround the tall, handsome, fair, young Afro-American priest." Slattery, Uncles's mentor, commented, "To the whites it was a surprising innovation; to the colored, an evidence of the universality of the Church."

Following his ordination, Slattery initially wanted Uncles to go on speaking tours across the country, but Uncles refused to be "trotted out before the public gaze" and become "a show priest." He was instead appointed professor of Latin and Greek at the newly opened Epiphany Apostolic College in Baltimore, a minor seminary which Slattery had established as a feeder for St. Joseph's Seminary. He remained in this position for over 40 years, until his death in 1933. He was very popular among the students at Epiphany, who referred to him as "Daddy Uncles." He continued his academic duties when the college moved to New Windsor, New York, in 1925.

=== Josephites ===
In 1893, Rev. Slattery petitioned for the separation of the American branch of the Mill Hill Fathers from their headquarters in the United Kingdom. The petition was approved, and the Society of Saint Joseph of the Sacred Heart was formed—with Slattery as its first superior general and Uncles, John DeRuyter, Dominic Manley, and Lambert Welbers as its first members.

== Death and legacy ==
Uncles died at Epiphany Apostolic College on July 21, 1933, at the age of 73. He is buried at Calvary Cemetery in New Windsor.

Charles R. Uncles Senior Plaza, a residence for low-income senior citizens in Baltimore, is named in his honor. In June 2011, the 600 block of Baltimore's Pennsylvania Avenue (where the Senior Plaza is located) was renamed "Fr. Charles R. Uncles Way."

== See also ==
- James Augustine Healy
- Augustus Tolton

== Sources ==
- Ochs, Stephen J. (1990). Desegregating the Altar: The Josephites and the Struggle for Black Priests, 1871-1960. Louisiana State University Press.
- Foley, Albert Sidney (1969). God's Men of Color. Arno Press.
