= Joseph Anciaux =

Belgian-American Catholic priest and anti-racist (1860–1931)

Joseph B. Anciaux, SSJ (1858 or 1860–23 February 1931), was a Belgian Catholic priest who ministered in the United States during the early 20th century until his return to Belgium. Anciaux worked among largely African American populations and was a member of the Josephites, a society of apostolic life founded to work among African Americans.

After witnessing racism among the American episcopate, Anciaux heavily criticized the hierarchy and his priestly faculties were eventually suspended in the Diocese of Richmond. However, his protestations spurred Pope Leo XIII to establish the Catholic Board for Mission Work Among the Colored People in 1907. His work also influenced the later-canonized Katharine Drexel's missionary work with Native Americans and African Americans, as well as Archbishop Sebastiano Martinelli's inquiries into the American Catholic hierarchy.

== Biography ==
Joseph Anciaux was born in Namur, Belgium, in either 1858 or 1860. Anciaux was proud of the wealthy noble family he descended from. He was ordained in 1884 and spent the first decade of his priesthood as a parochial vicar in Belgium, primarily among the Walloon minority. He also contributed large portions of his wealth–including a sizable inheritance from his mother–to missionary efforts in Africa and Asia. Interested in becoming a missionary in the United States, Anciaux contacted the American College at Leuven.

While the dates of Anciaux's trips and assignments are not known with certainty, he arrived in Louisiana in or shortly after 1895. He spent time as a missionary among Native Americans and African Americans in the Oklahoma Territory in 1897. During his ministry in Oklahoma, Anciaux developed an affinity for ministering to African Americans and soon came into contact with John R. Slattery, the superior of the Josephites. The Josephites, a society of apostolic life founded to work among African Americans, offered Anciaux a missionary assignment to the Diocese of Richmond in Virginia. Accepting in September 1900, Anciaux helped found a successful parish in Lynchburg.

Anciaux was assigned to the largely African American population of Langston, Oklahoma in 1902. During his time there, Anciaux was uncharacteristically fond of the local bishop, Theophile Meerschaert.

In 1904, Anciaux wrote a 46-page pamphlet published in Namur. Entitled De Miserabile Conditione Catholicorum Nigrorum in America (The Miserable Condition of Black Catholics in America, sometimes known as the "Red Book"), the pamphlet described segregation within the Catholic Church in the United States, the humiliation and exclusion of Blacks in Catholic schooling, and the unwillingness among American bishops to defend African Americans for fear of raising backlash among whites.

During his time in the Archdiocese of New Orleans, Anciaux–a French speaker–shared the opinion of the archdiocese's French clergy in disliking the unpopular and often-absent archbishop, Placide-Louis Chapelle. Anciaux personally disliked Chapelle's "aloofness", writing that "the best [Chapelle] can do is go to Cuba."

Due to illness, Anciaux returned to Belgium. Anciaux lived off a small Josephite pension until he died on February 23, 1931.
