= Marlon Green =

American aviator (1929–2009)

Marlon Dewitt Green (June 6, 1929 – July 6, 2009) was an African-American pilot whose landmark United States Supreme Court decision in 1963 helped dismantle racial discrimination in the American passenger airline industry.

The decision led to David E. Harris's hiring as the first African-American pilot for a major airline the following year. Green was subsequently hired by Continental Airlines, for whom he flew from 1965 to 1978.

== Biography ==
Marlon Green is born in El Dorado, Arkansas. His father, Mckinley Green, was born in 1900, and married Green's mother, Lucy, on April 10, 1921.

In 1936 or 1937, the family moved to Lansing, Michigan, where he found work at the Drop Forge Company. He later joined the household staff of dentist J. Shelton Rushing as what his son called the major domo. Green converted to Catholicism in the 11th grade and attended Xavier University Preparatory School in New Orleans before studying to become a priest with the Josephites at Epiphany Apostolic College. He was eventually dismissed.

Marlon Green joined the United States Air Force, where his last posting was flying the SA-16 Albatross with the 36th Air Rescue Squadron at Johnson Air Base in Tokyo, Japan. While on leave in 1957, he applied for a pilot position with Continental Airlines, and was invited to be interviewed after having left blank the racial-identity question on the application. He also omitted pasting into the small square block provided in the upper right hand corner of the first page of the application, a picture of himself. Five other white applicants, less qualified, were hired. Per varying sources, he either was rejected then, or was hired as what would have been the nation's first African-American pilot for a major commercial airline, but was rejected after reporting for orientation. On April 22, 1963, following oral arguments on March 28, 1963, the United States Supreme Court ruled in "Colorado Anti-Discrimination Commission v. Continental Airlines, Inc. 372 U.S. 714 no. 146" that Green had been unlawfully discriminated against. (Note: Per the court decision, Green had not been formally hired: "His application was submitted at Continental's headquarters in Denver, Colorado, and was later considered and rejected there.") In 1964, American Airlines hired David E. Harris as the first African-American pilot for major US passenger airline.

Following his Supreme Court victory, Green flew for Continental from 1965 to 1978, initially piloting Vickers Viscounts out of Denver. He became a captain in 1966.

Green died aged 80 in Denver, Colorado.

== Personal life ==
He was divorced at the time of his death and was survived by his six children, one of whom is the historian Monica Green.

== Legacy ==
On February 16, 2010, at George Bush Intercontinental Airport in Houston, Texas, Continental Airlines named a Boeing 737-824 (N77518, cn 31605) after him.

During his lifetime, Green was inducted into the Arkansas Aviation Hall of Fame.

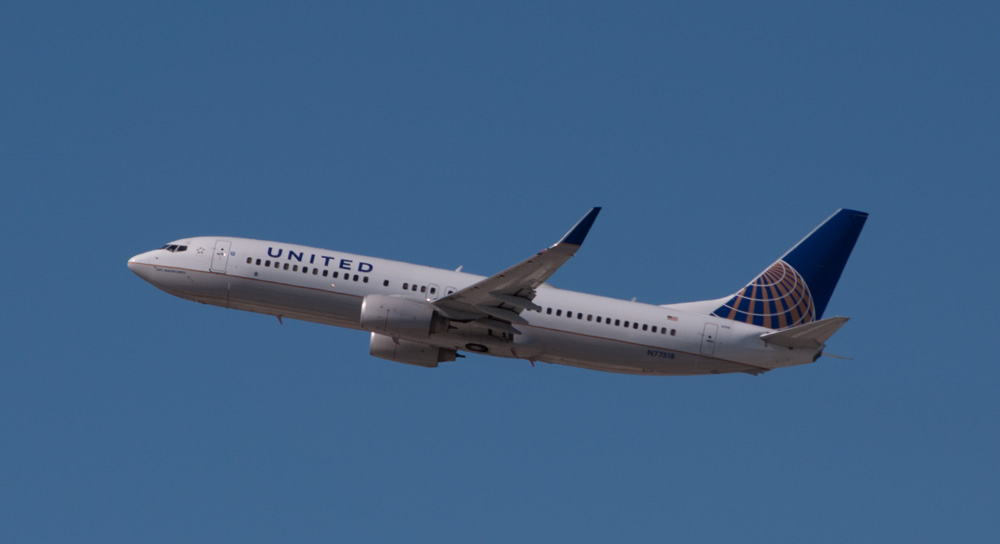
N77518, the 737-800 named in honour to Marlon Green
