= Kingsblood Royal =

1947 novel by Sinclair Lewis

- Cover of the first edition
- Author: Sinclair Lewis
- Language: English
- Subject: Racial discrimination
- Genre: Satire
- Publisher: Random House
- Publication date: 1947
- Publication place: United States

Kingsblood Royal is a 1947 novel by American writer Sinclair Lewis.

== Synopsis ==
The protagonist, Neil Kingsblood, a white middle-class man, discovers while researching his family background that he is directly descended from an African adventurer on the American frontier. (His ancestor is loosely modeled after Pierre Bonga, an African American who worked as a fur trader for the North West Company.)

Through various machinations, Kingsblood loses his banking job and takes a lesser one. He begins to be treated differently by former acquaintances, despite the lack of visible black African ancestry. He is forced to choose between continuing what he has come to see as a hollow existence in the white community and taking on the oppressed minority status of the black community.

After Kingsblood tells several white friends about his newfound ancestry, the news quickly spreads, and he finds that acquaintances change their behavior toward him. He engages in a quixotic struggle against the racism newly apparent but widespread in his community.

Because Kingsblood is now black, it is illegal for him and his family to live in their home, which is in a whites-only neighborhood. In the climactic scene, which is based on the real life Ossian Sweet incident which occurred in Detroit in 1925, a mob of their former neighbors comes to force the Kingsbloods out. The sense of helplessness against massive injustice is broken only by the final line of the work, which offers hope for the future.

"Keep moving," said a policeman.
"We're moving," said Vestal.

== Background ==
Earlier on in his career, Lewis had reconnected with a childhood friend, Edward Francis Murphy, a priest who was a member of the Josephites (a Catholic society that specifically works with African Americans). Via this connection, Lewis learned of the intricacies of the black community in the United States, leading directly to his creation of the novel.

Additionally, Lewis met Walter Francis White, president of the NAACP and a man of majority European ancestry, and many of his professional circles. A number among them were clearly persons of mixed ancestry, composing the educated elites of black society. Given their visible and in some cases majority European ancestry, some had relatives or friends who had chosen to live as white. Lewis consulted with White on the novel.

== Reception ==
While some white critics found the novel contrived, Ebony, a prominent African-American magazine, ranked it as the most important novel of the year. "The white establishment tended to view the novel as wildly implausible. Black people viewed it as profoundly perceptive."

That same year, Rev. Kenneth L. Patton of the First Unitarian Church in Madison, Wisconsin, having read the novel, formally "renounced" the white race and declared himself "colored," saying he was one sixty-fourth Native American. Unlike Lewis's novel, however, Patton was met with general approval, including from his congregation and his family. The NAACP even heartily welcomed him into "the colored race."

Shortly after the publication of Kingsblood Royal, a group of white supremacists sent a letter to J. Edgar Hoover encouraging the FBI to seize all copies of the book and declare Lewis' novel an act of sedition.

== Sources ==
- Robert Fleming, "Kingsblood Royal and the Black 'Passing' Novel" in Critical Essays on Sinclair Lewis, editor Martin Bucco (Boston: G. K. Hall & Company, 1986)
- Richard Lingeman, Sinclair Lewis: Rebel from Main Street (New York: Random House, 2002)
- Mark Schorer, Sinclair Lewis: An American Life (New York: McGraw-Hill, 1961)
