= Carl Anthony Fisher =

African-American Catholic prelate

His Excellency, The Most Reverend Carl Anthony Fisher SSJ
- Auxiliary Bishop of Los Angeles
- Church: Catholic Church
- Archdiocese: Los Angeles
- Appointed: December 23, 1986
- Term ended: September 3, 1993
- Other post: Titular Bishop of Tlos

Orders
- Ordination: June 2, 1973 by Joseph Bernard Brunini
- Consecration: February 23, 1987 by Roger Michael Mahony, John James Ward, Juan Alfredo Arzube

Personal details
- Born: November 24, 1945 Pascagoula, Mississippi, US
- Died: September 3, 1993 (aged 47) Los Angeles, California, US
- Buried: Cathedral of Our Lady of the Angels
- Education: Epiphany Apostolic College; St. Joseph's Seminary
- Motto: Teach all I have commanded

Carl Anthony Fisher, SSJ (November 24, 1945 – September 2, 1993) was an African-American prelate of the Roman Catholic Church in the United States. He served as an auxiliary bishop of the Archdiocese of Los Angeles from 1987 to 1993. He was the first Black Catholic bishop on the West Coast.

Fisher was a member of the Society of St. Joseph of the Sacred Heart. He was the third Josephite to be made a bishop. During the 2000s, multiple individuals reported that Fisher had sexually abused them as children in both Baltimore and Los Angeles.

== Biography ==
=== Early life ===
Carl Fisher was born on November 24, 1945, in Pascagoula, Mississippi. He attended Epiphany Apostolic College in Baltimore, Maryland, and St. Joseph's Seminary in Washington, D.C.

=== Priesthood ===
Fisher was ordained to the priesthood for the Josephites at St. Peter Church in Pascagoula by Bishop Joseph Bernard Brunini on June 2, 1973. He then served in Baltimore for some time, including at St Francis Xavier Parish beginning in 1982.

=== Auxiliary Bishop of Los Angeles ===
On December 23, 1986, Pope John Paul II named Fisher as titular bishop of Tlos and as an auxiliary bishop of Los Angeles. He was consecrated on February 23, 1987. He was the first African-American Catholic bishop west of Texas.

=== Retirement and legacy ===
Fisher retired as auxiliary bishop of Los Angeles on January 24, 1993. He died on September 2, 1993, in Los Angeles of colon cancer at age 47.
