= Antoine Garibaldi =

Antoine Michael Garibaldi

6th President of Gannon University
- In office June 2001 – June 2010
- Succeeded by: Keith Taylor

25th President of University of Detroit Mercy
- In office June 2011 – June 2022
- Succeeded by: Donald B. Taylor

Personal details
- Born: September 26, 1950 (age 75) New Orleans, Louisiana
- Spouse: Carol Jupiter Garibaldi

Antoine Michael Garibaldi is president emeritus and distinguished university professor of University of Detroit Mercy. He was the 25th and first lay president of the University of Detroit Mercy in Detroit, Michigan. He was the school's first African-American president and the first openly African American president of any Jesuit university.

== Early life and education ==
Garibaldi attended St. Joan of Arc Grammar School and St. Augustine High School for eighth grade in New Orleans, Louisiana, his hometown. He then entered seminary with the Josephites at Epiphany Apostolic College in Newburgh, New York, in 1964. After leaving the Josephites, he graduated with a bachelor's degree in sociology and a minor in philosophy from Howard University in 1973. He obtained his PhD in Educational Psychology in 1976 from the University of Minnesota and was the third African American to do.

== Career ==
Garibaldi’s early career included service as an elementary teacher in Washington, D.C., and as principal of the St. Paul Urban League Street Academy in Minnesota. Between 1982 and 1996, he served successively as professor and chairman of the Education Department, dean of the College of Arts and Sciences, and as the first lay vice president for academic affairs at Xavier University of Louisiana.

Garibaldi was selected as the first Provost and Chief Academic Officer of Howard University in 1996. He then served as the 6th president of Gannon University in Erie, Pennsylvania from 2001 to 2010.

Garibaldi was appointed as the 25th president of University of Detroit Mercy in June 2011. He was the school's first African-American president and the first openly African American president of any Jesuit university. He announced his decision to transition to president emeritus and distinguished university professor in August 2021, to go into effect the following July.

== Personal life ==
Garibaldi is a Catholic, and was formerly a seminarian with the Josephites. Garibaldi is a member of Sigma Pi Phi.
