= Institute of Mission Helpers of the Sacred Heart =

The Institute of Mission Helpers of the Sacred Heart is a Catholic religious congregation for women, founded in 1890 in Baltimore, Maryland. Initially established to provide religious education for Black children, their apostolate developed to address the needs of the neglected poor in general. Their emphasis is on catechetical and social work.

== History ==
=== Founding ===
Around 1888, widowed Catholic convert Anna Frances Hartwell moved from Chicago to Baltimore to do social work and conduct catechism classes for the city's black population, at the request of John R. Slattery, superior general of the Josephites. She and four other women formed a religious community under the name of Mission Helpers, Daughters of the Holy Ghost, dedicated to providing religious education for black people. The convent was on Biddle Street in Baltimore. They were known as "the Tan Sisters" for their tan habits. In 1893 Hartwell assumed the title Mother Joseph.

Baltimore native Mary Frances Cunningham discovered that the black children in her southwest neighborhood were excluded from religious education classes at St. Martin's Church. She began to teach the children, first on the church steps, and then in the basement. Cunningham joined the Mission Helpers in 1891, taking the name Sister Mary Demetrias. One of the group's first efforts was to open an industrial school for girls to teach workplace skills so that they could help support their families. They also established a professional laundry that provided employment for local women.

In 1895, the name of the institute was changed to 'Mission Helpers of the Sacred Heart'. Their ministry was expanded to assisting the neglected poor regardless of race. Hence, their field of missionary and catechetical labour was greatly broadened.

Slattery, whose apostolate was focused on the black population, was unenthusiastic about this change in direction. The Mission Helpers consulted James Gibbons, Archbishop of Baltimore, and in 1896 he assigned Fr Peter Tarro to replace Slattery as spiritual director.

They established daycare centers for the children of working mothers, and in 1896 provided catechism classes to Italian immigrants. In 1897, at the request of Cardinal Gibbons, St. Francis Xavier's school for the deaf. This was the first such Catholic institution in the ecclesiastical province of Baltimore.

=== Expansion ===
In 1902 the sisters established a foundation in Puerto Rico and opened a school for the deaf there also. This was a heavy undertaking, as the demands on the sisters for missionary and catechetical work in Porto Rico were very great, and the need urgent. They were the first community of Catholic sisters in the Marianas and Micronesia, arriving on Guam in 1905. The Government welcomed the presence of American sisters who could teach English and assist in the public health efforts of the government. However, much of the work was not the ministry for which their community was founded, and some of the sisters had not adapted well to the tropical climate. They were recalled to Baltimore in 1908.

At the first general chapter of the institute, which was held on 5 November 1906. A constitution was adopted, and a superior general and her assistants elected. At this first election Mother M. Demetrias was chosen as mother general. The community was then officially declared canonically organized. On account of their missionary labours the sisters were unable to keep up the work of perpetual adoration, consequently it was decided to schedule it to the First Fridays.

In 1922, they purchased the Boyce mansion from the Deford family in West Towson, Maryland. A portion of the land was sold in on 1981 to the Blakehurst senior community, and a new motherhouse built next door.

In New York, the Sisters ran St. Pascal Day Nursery in Manhattan, and the Mount Mongola summer camp in Ellenville. They established a house in Venezuela in 1962.

Sister Rosalia Walsh developed the "Adaptive Way", a method to teach religion in a way appropriate to a child's age. The program has been adopted by catechists in a number of dioceses.

== Present day ==
The Mission Helpers are based in West Towson, Maryland. Their annual crab feast at the Towson American Legion has become a local tradition. They also host an annual flea market at the Mission Helpers Center. The Center is home to the Asylee Women's Enterprise, a support group for women waiting to apply for asylum. The sisters continue to work in parishes, hospitals, nursing homes, senior communities and college campuses in the United States, Puerto Rico, and Venezuela. The sisters are active in the Diocese of Orlando.

== Sources ==
- Herbermann, Charles, ed. (1913). "Institute of Mission Helpers of the Sacred Heart". Catholic Encyclopedia. New York: Robert Appleton Company.
- "Religious Orders of Women in the United States", (Elinor Tong Dehey, ed.) (Indiana: W.B. Conkey, 1913), 295-298
