= Shadow and Substance =

1937 play

1938 Playbill cover

Shadow and Substance is a four-act play written in 1937 by Paul Vincent Carroll. In 1938 it won the New York Drama Critics' Circle award for Best Foreign Play.

== Description ==
Set in Ireland, the play has a cast of six men and four women. According to George Jean Nathan:

"[It] deals with the Catholic Church in Ireland. Its theme lies in the ramifications of faith as practiced by the Church's various constituents…faith that, for all its sincerity, has drifted from its deepest moorings, and the manner in which a true, steadfast, innocent, and unselfish believer, a young girl, brings the contentious others, through the uncorrupted purity and simplicity of her own faith, back to first principles. And the role of the young girl, a little caretaker in the house of the canon, though built out of materials that in cruder hands would quickly betray their spirit and such a restrained gentility of writing ink that, if it is cast at all appropriately, it can hardly fail to dig into an audience's emotions. The straw out of which Carroll has fabricated his bricks and built his play is of a superior quality, and his dramatic structure, as a consequence, mounts aloft with eloquence and power."

== Cast ==
- Julie Haydon - Brigid (Canon Skerritt's Servant)
- Lloyd Gough - Dermot Francis O'Flingsley (the local schoolmaster)
- Valerie Cossart - Thomasina Concannon (Canon Skerritt's niece)
- Harry Sothern - Father Corr
- Len Doyle - Father Kirwan
- Sir Cedric Hardwicke - Very Rev. Thomas Skerritt
- Sara Allgood -Miss Jemima Cooney (a local spinster)
- Gerald Buckley - Francis Ignatius O'Connor (her nephew)
- John L. Kearney - Martin Mullahone (the local publican)
- Almira Sessions - Rosey Violet (his wife)

== History ==
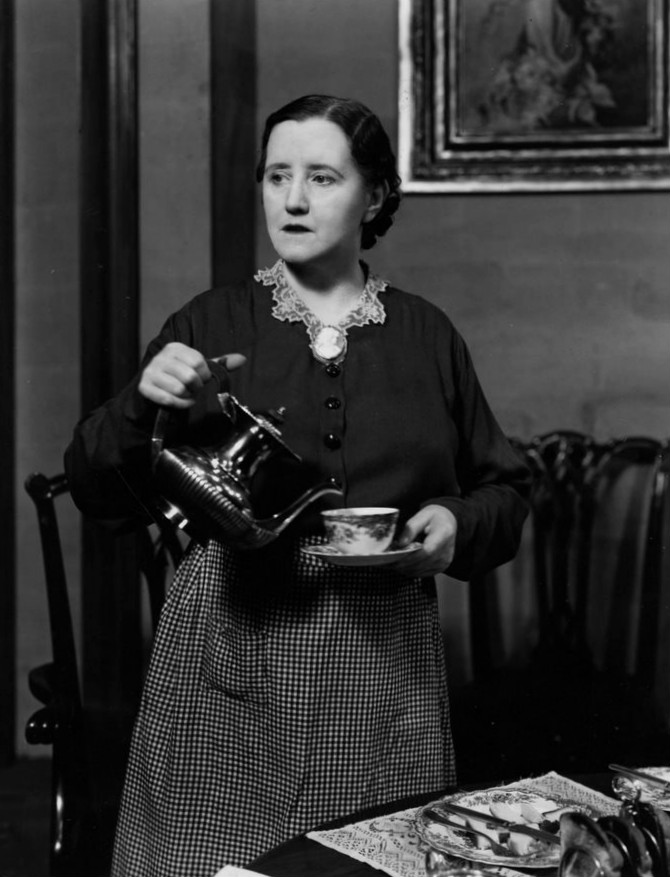
Sara Allgood in the original Broadway production of Shadow and Substance (1938)

The play was originally produced by Eddie Dowling at the John Golden Theatre on January 26, 1938. Directed by Peter Godfrey, settings by David M. Twachtman, costumes by Helene Pons, and the art director was James C. Scully.

Soon after, Dowling gave the rights to a Josephite priest in New Orleans named Edward Francis Murphy, who worked with theater students at Xavier University of Louisiana. Murphy himself would later pass on the rights to a local company which produced a version starring Sinclair Lewis.

== Adaptations ==
It was adapted for Australian radio in 1941 starring Grant Taylor.

Charlie Chaplin purchased the film rights in 1942 and wrote a script, intending to cast Joan Barry in the lead. Their subsequent relationship led to legal troubles and a public downturn in Chaplin's popularity, so the project was never begun, and the script remains in the Chaplin archives.

It was first published by Samuel French in 1944.
