= St. Joseph's Seminary (Washington, D.C.) =

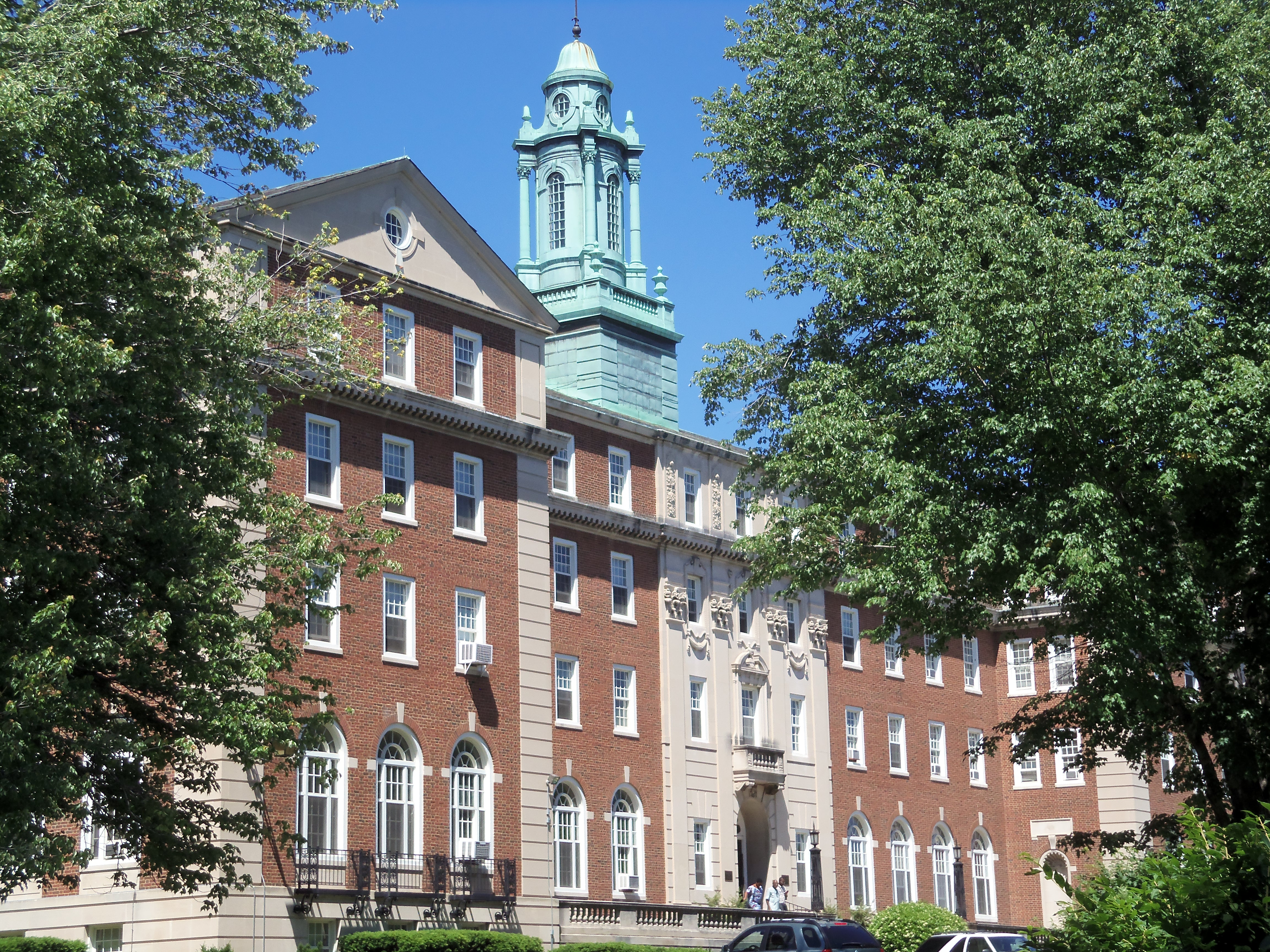
- St Joseph Seminary, DC

Religion
- Affiliation: Catholic Church
- Rite: Latin Church
- Ecclesiastical or organisational status: Active
- Ownership: Society of St Joseph of the Sacred Heart
- Leadership: Fr Leo Udeagu, SSJ (vice rector); Fr Anthony Bozeman, SSJ (academic dean)
- Patron: St Joseph
- Year consecrated: 1930

Location
- Country: United States
- Interactive map of St. Joseph's Seminary
- Coordinates: 38°56′37″N 76°59′21″W

Architecture
- Architect: Maginnis & Walsh
- Style: Colonial Revival architecture
- Established: 1888 (Baltimore)
- Groundbreaking: 1929

- St Joseph's Seminary
- U.S. National Register of Historic Places
- Location: Washington, D.C.
- Built: 1930
- Architect: Maginnis & Walsh
- Architectural style: Colonial Revival architecture
- NRHP reference No.: 100008232
- Added to NRHP: September 28, 2022

St. Joseph's Seminary is a former Catholic major seminary and current house of formation in Washington, D.C. for the Society of St. Joseph of the Sacred Heart (also known as the Josephites), a Catholic society of apostolic life that serves African Americans. The seminary was the first in the United States to accept Black men into formation for the Catholic priesthood and religious life.

St Joseph's was originally founded in Baltimore, Maryland in 1888 by Fr John R. Slattery for the Mill Hill Missionaries, from which the Josephites became independent 5 years later. The Josephite iteration of the seminary was relocated to DC in 1930.

The seminary property was listed in the National Register of Historic Places in September 2022.

== History ==
St. Joseph's Seminary was founded in Baltimore, Maryland by John R. Slattery in 1888 as a major seminary for the Mill Hill Missionaries, an English Catholic religious community that came to the United States to minister to newly emancipated former slaves following the American Civil War. The seminary became independent of Mill Hill along with the Josephites in 1893, and moved to Washington, DC in 1930.

The building is located on the Brookland neighborhood of DC, also known as "Little Rome", known for the various Catholic institutions established in the area following the revelation of plans for the Basilica of the National Shrine of the Immaculate Conception in 1914.

The seminary has served as the place of formation for several significant Catholic religious figures, including Charles Uncles, the first African-American Catholic priest trained and ordained in the United States, and the notable priest-activist Philip Berrigan. For several decades in the early to late 20th century, however, racial politics led to the seminary being closed to most African Americans.

Constructed in a Neo-Georgian style, the building received a new chapel wing in 1958.

For several decades, the seminary operated as an academic institution, possessing its own faculty as a degree-granting institution for men studying to become Josephites. The seminary closed for studies in the early 1970s, following conflicts related to the Black power movement and the resultant exodus of most of the society's seminarians, Black and White.

In recent decades, the seminary has functioned as the residence for the society's seminarians, most of whom hail from Nigeria and study at the nearby Catholic University of America. The building also houses several retired Josephites, the Paulist formation community, and a community of Franciscan religious sisters from Mexico who perform domestic duties.

Due to the society's financial difficulties, the property's significant backyard green space was sold in 2017, later developed into a set of townhouses opened in 2022. An adjoining park was also built along with the new development, near the existing Josephite Seminary Park.

The building was listed on the National Register of Historic Places in September 2022.

== Notable alumni ==
- Charles Uncles
- William "Bill" Norvel
- Philip Berrigan
- Bishop John H. Ricard
- Bishop Carl A. Fisher
- Archbishop Eugene A. Marino
- Edward Francis Murphy

== See also ==
- Josephites (Maryland)
- Epiphany Apostolic College
- John R. Slattery
- Black Catholicism
- Brookland (Washington, D.C.)
