= William Norvel =

American Catholic priest (1935/1936–2026)

The Reverend Bill Norvel SSJ
- Superior general
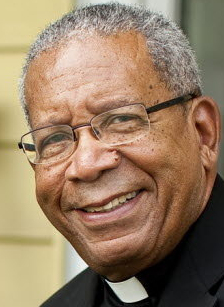
- Installed: 2011
- Term ended: 2014
- Predecessor: Fr Edward J. Chiffriller, SSJ
- Successor: Fr Michael Thompson, SSJ

Orders
- Ordination: 1965

Personal details
- Born: October 1, 1935 Pascagoula, Mississippi, U.S.
- Died: March 8, 2026 (aged 90)
- Parents: Velma and William Norvel Sr.
- Occupation: Administrator, pastor, liturgist, author
- Education: St. Joseph's Seminary (Washington, DC); Epiphany Apostolic College

William Leonard Norvel Jr., SSJ (October 1, 1935– March 8, 2026) was an American Catholic priest who served as the 13th and first Black superior general of the Society of St. Joseph of the Sacred Heart, also known as the Josephites. The society was founded to serve African Americans in 1893. Norvel, ordained to the priesthood in 1965, became superior in 2011; the first Black man to head a Catholic religious community in the United States.

Norvel is also known for his work during the Black Catholic Movement, in which he helped spread the use of Black Gospel music and other elements of Black spirituality in African-American Catholic parishes throughout the country. He is said to have established the first Catholic gospel choirs in history.

== Biography ==
Born in Pascagoula, Mississippi on October 1, 1935 to William Sr. and Velma Norvel. The younger William was raised in Pascagoula at St. Peter the Apostle Catholic Church; he attended St. Peter's Elementary and Our Mother of Sorrows High School in Biloxi, Mississippi. He initially sought to become a priest while a teenager, but was dissuaded by the Diocese of Jackson, representatives of which told him that there was "no place in the Church" for him as an African-American priest. Since the introduction of Catholicism to North America in the 16th century, Black men had been largely barred from Catholic seminaries in the New World, and especially the United States.

Norvel was eventually encouraged by his Josephite pastor to pursue membership in that religious community, which serves African Americans specifically. He entered Epiphany Apostolic College in New York and later matriculated to St Joseph's Seminary in Washington, D.C., where he received his Master of Divinity.

He was ordained in 1965 at the Cathedral Basilica of St. Louis in New Orleans, Louisiana and was first assigned to Holy Family Catholic Church in Natchez, Mississippi. There, he faced opposition from the Ku Klux Klan and other elements of anti-Black racism. A particular flashpoint was a dance for teenagers.

He later served in parishes in Washington, D.C.; Mobile, Alabama; Baltimore, Maryland; Baton Rouge, Louisiana; Los Angeles, California; and Pascagoula. He also taught at St. Augustine High School, the Josephites' all-boys Black Catholic institution in New Orleans, the University of Notre Dame, and Loyola Marymount University.

Norvel is perhaps best known for his efforts to establish Black liturgical patrimony in the Catholic Church, wherein he traveled the country establishing gospel choirs at African-American Catholic parishes. While serving as the Josephites' consultor general and president of the National Black Catholic Clergy Caucus, Norvel also served as a contributor to Lead Me, Guide Me: The African American Catholic Hymnal, released in 1987 by GIA Publications as the first of its kind.

His liturgical work came during the Black Catholic Movement, first launched in 1968 by the National Black Catholic Clergy Caucus in the wake of the assassination of Martin Luther King Jr. Norvel was one of the many priests, religious, and laypeople who sought to combat racism in the US Catholic Church and solidify a uniquely Black Catholic expression of Christianity.

Later in his priesthood, Norvel spearheaded the Josephites' efforts to establish a vocations hub in Nigeria, where desire for the priesthood was stronger than in the United States; the society had struggled to attract new members following a mass exodus of the society's seminarians in the early 1970s due to conflicts related to the Black power movement. Norvel's efforts overseas were successful, attracting various applicants while Norvel himself resided in the country for five years, introducing African-American liturgy to Nigerian Catholics and opening a house of formation.

Following his work in Nigeria, Norvel became pastor of Our Lady of Perpetual Help in Washington, DC. While there, he was tapped to become the Josephites' superior general, after 118 years of White leadership in that position. Norvel, 75 years old at the time, had been planning to retire before receiving the request. He accepted and became superior in 2011. He served one term and retired in 2015, the 50th year of his priesthood.

Norvel died on March 8, 2026, at the age of 90.

== Memberships ==
Norvel was a member of the Knights of Peter Claver, the Knights of Columbus and the National Association of Superiors General.

== Published works ==
- A Hallelujah Song!: Memoir of a Black Catholic Priest from the Jim Crow South

== See also ==
- Josephites (Maryland)
- Black Catholicism
- St. Joseph's Seminary (Washington, DC)
- Epiphany Apostolic College
