= Josephite Harvest =

The Josephite Harvest
- Cover of the Autumn 2020 issue
- Editorial Team: Fr Donald Fest, SSJ; Fr Nixon Mullah, SSJ
- Categories: Catholic missions magazine
- Frequency: Quarterly
- Format: Physical and digital
- Publisher: Josephites, Bishop John Ricard, SSJ
- Founder: Fr John R. Slattery, SSJ
- Founded: 1888
- Country: United States
- Website: https://www.josephites.org/harvest-magazine/

The Josephite Harvest, originally named The Colored Harvest, is a Catholic periodical published by the Society of St Joseph of the Sacred Heart (also known as the Josephites). Founded in 1888, it is the oldest continually published Catholic missions magazine in the United States.

The Josephites serve African Americans and the magazine chronicles their work in Black Catholic parishes and apostolates across the country. It also covers other news of interest from that community and from the wider US and global Church.
