= Augustus Tolton =

American Catholic priest (1854–1897)

Venerable Augustus Tolton
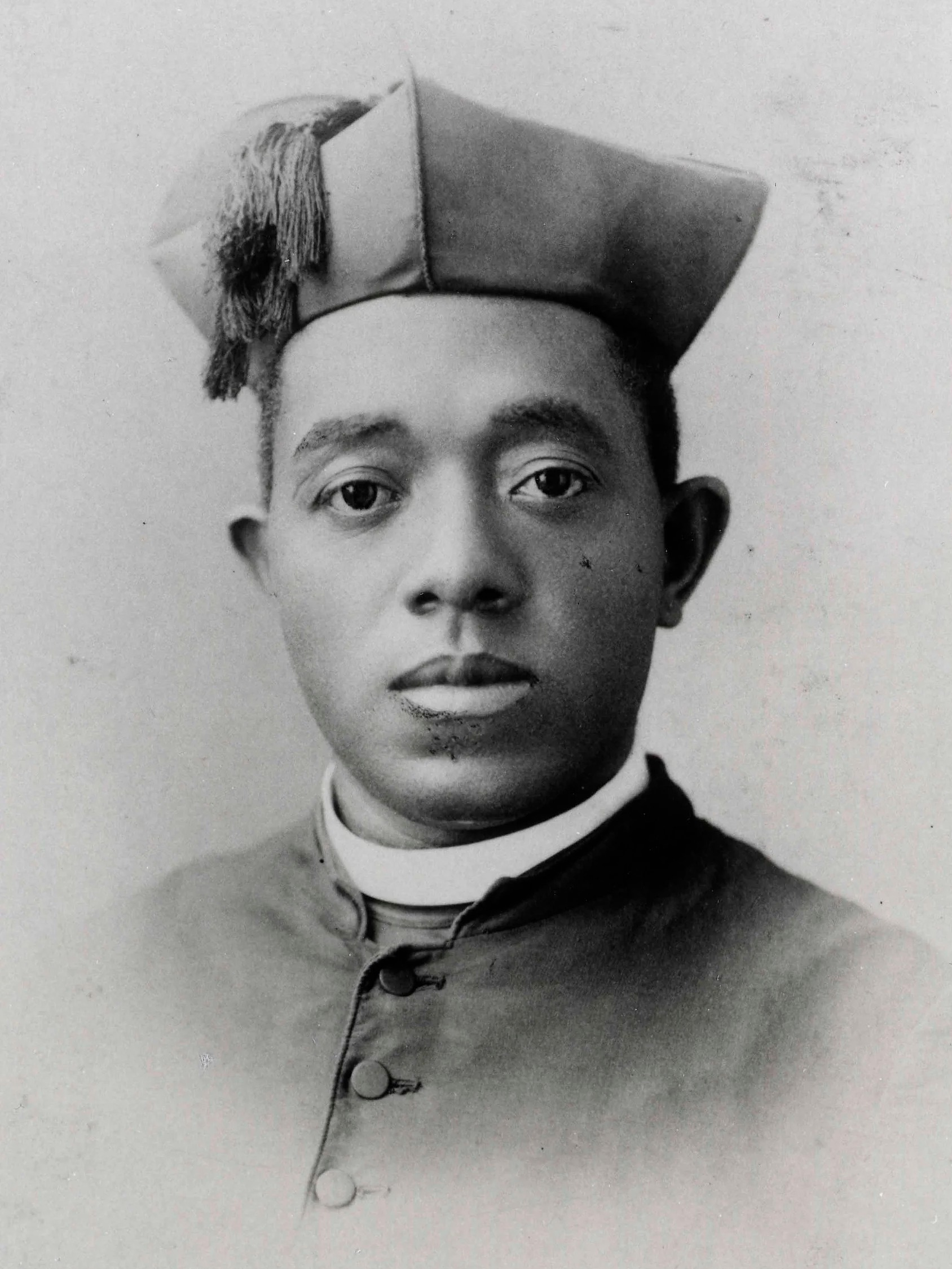
- Portrait of Tolton
- Born: John Augustus Tolton; April 1, 1854; Ralls County, Missouri, U.S.
- Died: July 9, 1897 (aged 43); Chicago, Illinois, U.S.

John Augustus Tolton (baptized Augustine; April 1, 1854 – July 9, 1897) was an African American Catholic who served as the first Black Catholic priest in the United States, having been ordained in Rome in 1886. He was preceded by the Healy brothers, Catholic priests who passed as White.

Born into slavery in Missouri, Tolton and his family escaped in 1863 and settled in Quincy, Illinois. Despite being very well-educated, multilingual, and fully supported by local Irish- and German-American priests and by Bishop Peter Joseph Baltes, all of whom believed in his priestly vocation, Tolton was rejected by every American major seminary to which he applied, as well as by the Mill Hill Missionaries in London. Unmoved, the bishop arranged for his reception into the Pontifical Urban University in Rome, where Tolton was ordained in 1886. Originally expecting to serve as a missionary in Africa, Tolton was instead reassigned by Cardinal Giovanni Simeoni to the United States as a missionary to his fellow African Americans.

Assigned to the Diocese of Alton, Tolton first ministered at his home parish in Quincy, despite considerable opposition from both the German-American dean of the parish and local African-American Protestant ministers. Reassigned at his own request to the Archdiocese of Chicago, Tolton, in a highly important move for African-American Catholicism, spearheaded the development and construction of St. Monica's Church as an African-American "national parish" on Chicago's South Side.

With the assistance of philanthropist Katharine Drexel, St Monica's was completed in 1893 at 36th and Dearborn Streets. "Good Father Gus", as he was called by his parishioners, died unexpectedly at 43 of heatstroke during the 1897 Chicago heatwave. Tolton's cause for beatification was announced by Cardinal Francis George in 2010. Tolton was declared venerable by Pope Francis in June 2019.

== Early life ==
=== Parents and birth ===
Tolton's mother, Martha Jane Chisley, was the daughter of Augustus and Matilda (née Hurd) Chisley (d. 1836), and grew up as the slave of John Henry Manning in Meade County, Kentucky. Martha Jane Chisley was also a cradle Catholic who had grown up attending St. Theresa's Catholic Church in Rhodelia. After the death of Manning in 1835, the Chisley children were forcibly separated from their parents and divided up among his different heirs. Martha Jane Chisley was inherited by her owner's daughter, Ann or Susan (née Manning) Elliott, as part of a wedding dowry.

Tolton was born illegitimately and in slavery on April 1, 1854 in Ralls County, Missouri or Brush Creek, Missouri to Martha Jane Chisley. He was baptized into the Catholic Church as "a slave child" owned by Stephen Elliott on May 29, 1854 at St. Peter's Catholic Church located in Rensselaer, near Hannibal, Missouri. His master's daughter, Savilla Elliott, was Tolton's godmother and taught her parents' slaves Catholic religion classes. Savilla Elliott's classes, however, did not extend beyond memorisation of the Ten Commandments, which Martha Jane Chisley often prayed by reciting them aloud at deeply emotional and fearful moments, but without understanding their meaning.

According to Joyce Duriga:

"In 1859 -- five years after Augustus was born -- their respective owners gave Martha Jane and a man named Peter Paul permission to marry. Peter Paul was a fellow slave who worked on the neighboring Hagar plantation in the distillery. Given the years between Augustus' birth and the marriage, it is unlikely that Peter was Augustus' biological father but would have been the only father he knew. Later in life, Augustus never referred to Peter Paul as his father."

=== Freedom ===
How the Tolton family gained their freedom remains a subject of debate. According to the Elliott family's descendants, Stephen Elliott freed all of his slaves at the outbreak of the American Civil War and allowed them to move North. Their estate papers, however, tell a very different story.

In July 1863, Tolton's master, Stephen Elliott, died and left his estate considerably burdened by debt. In response, his widow, Ann Elliott, ordered all their property appraised, including the slaves. Martha was appraised at $59, her eldest son Charles at $100, her daughter Ann at $75, and youngest son Augustus at $25.

Tolton's stepfather Peter Paul Hagar escaped from slavery first. According to United States military records, he enlisted on September 20, 1863 in the 3rd Arkansas Infantry Regiment of Colored Troops at Hannibal, Missouri as "Peter Paul Lefevre", a nome de guerre derived from the surname of the priest who had baptized him. He was intending to fight in the Union Army during the American Civil War, but Peter died of dysentery on January 12, 1864 in a military hospital in Helena, Arkansas.

According to the Elliott estate papers, at sometime between July and September 1863 Martha Jane Chisley and her children went missing. In response, Ann Elliot hired slave catchers with a $10 down payment to apprehend the Chisley family under the Fugitive Slave Act of 1850. In his later lectures and in print, Tolton alleged that Ann Elliott promised a bounty of $600 for the recapture of his whole family, dead or alive.

At the time, Union Army Regiments assigned to Missouri and other border States were under strict orders not to interfere with slavery as long as individual masters took an oath of loyalty to the Union. However, as the case of the 38 "Liberators" from the 9th Minnesota Infantry Regiment, whose November 1863 train robbery at Otterville, Missouri successfully rescued a runaway slave's wife and children from being sold out of the State demonstrates, Union soldiers, even at the risk of court-martial, routinely ignored these orders and defied them outright.

This is why, after making it to Hannibal on foot, Martha and her children were protected from efforts to arrest them by the local Union Army garrison. After Union soldiers in Hannibal provided Martha and her children with a rowboat, she successfully rowed her family one mile across the Mississippi River and into the Free State of Illinois.

=== Education and seminary ===
After settling in the shanty town known as "The Negro Quarter" in Quincy, Illinois, which then included an estimated 300 fellow Free Negroes, Martha, Augustus, and Charley began working at the Harris Tobacco Company, where they made cigars.

Martha enrolled her son in a local segregated public school named after Abraham Lincoln, where Tolton was placed in a class with much younger children and is believed to have been bullied by the older students. His first attempt to enter Catholic school, at St. Boniface downtown, was met with racist opposition, and he withdrew within a month.

After Charley's death at the age of ten, Tolton met Peter McGirr, a Catholic priest from Fintona, County Tyrone who had grown up in a nearby Irish-American farming community. McGirr took Tolton under his wing and arranged for him to attend St. Lawrence's (later known as St. Peter's) Catholic School during the winter months when the tobacco factory was closed. The priest's decision was controversial in the parish. Despite being treated well by the priests and the nuns, many of McGirr's parishioners objected to a Black student attending their children's school. McGirr held fast and allowed Tolton to continue studying there. Tolton received his First Communion and confirmation from Bishop Peter Joseph Baltes of the Diocese of Alton at St. Peter's Church on June 12, 1870, which is when the Chisley family's first use of their new surname Tolton appears in existing records. Even though runaway slaves routinely adopted new surnames to protect themselves from possible recapture, exactly why the Chisley family selected the last name Tolton remains unknown. Tolton graduated from St. Peter's school in 1872.

In 1874, a 20-year old Tolton was recruited to assist two local German-American priests in an effort to found a tuition free Catholic school for the children of Quincy's Black community. The school became so popular that the School Sisters of Notre Dame sent a professed nun and a postulant from Milwaukee to help teach at the school. One of the Sisters wrote at the time, "The older pupils studied the Catechism so diligently that the Holy Sacraments could be administered to them -- surely the new school's sweetest and most beneficial fruit..."

Even though African-American Baptist and Methodist ministers objected after seven students were baptized into the Catholic Church during the first year and succeeded by 1880 in forcing the Diocese to close the school down, Tolton always recalled this time in his life fondly. He later wrote, "I was a poor slave boy but the priests of the Church did not disdain me ... It was through one of them that I stand before you this day ... it was through the direction of a Sister of Notre Dame, Sister Herlinda, that I learned to interpret the Ten Commandments, and then I saw for the first time the glimmering light of truth and the majesty of the Church."

In 1875, Tolton briefly returned to his native Missouri, then rid of slavery after the Civil War.

While still teaching his fellow African Americans at the Catholic school, Tolton gained admission into St. Francis Solanus College (now Quincy University), which he attended from 1878-1880. No evidence now survives that he was required to pay tuition. At first, White students from Missouri threatened to leave the college if Tolton stayed, but the Franciscan Order replied that the Church would not discriminate based on skin color and the White students were free to leave if they wished. In 1880, Tolton graduated as the valedictorian of his class.

According to the Chicago Journal of History, Bishop Balthes reportedly instructed McGirr, "Find a seminary which will accept a Negro candidate. The Diocese will assume the expense." In his own letters to seminaries, Bishop Balthes repeatedly praised Tolton as, "more than ordinary."

Despite the bishop and McGirr's best efforts, Tolton was rejected by every American seminary to which he applied. Meanwhile, diocesan priests continue to tutor Tolton in Ecclesiastical Latin, Koine Greek, German, ancient and modern history, philosophy, and geography.

In a letter to the Mill Hill Missionaries, a religious order founded by Cardinal Herbert Vaughan to minister to the Black population of the British Empire from their headquarters in Mill Hill, North London, Theodore Wegmann, the assistant pastor of St. Boniface Church in Quincy, wrote:

"I make bold to apply to you on behalf of a young man of the African race, who is very desirous of becoming a missionary for the people of his race, and to whom I have been giving instruction for about a year and a half, having been requested by his Pastor, Reverend Peter McGirr of St. Peter's Church of this city. The young man in question is about 20 years of age, of an excellent character, and of good talents. Studying Latin for over a year, he reads Nepos and Caesar -- and some weeks ago I have begun Greek with him. I am very willing to direct his studies yet for some time, if I see a prospect for him of attaining the end he aims at, i.e. the sacred priesthood, if I know of a college that is prepared to admit him afterwards."

The Mill Hill Missionaries, whose American branch later became known as the Josephites, declined Wegmann's request and refused to admit Augustus Tolton. Joyce Duriga, commenting on the same religious community's later missionary work among African Americans throughout the United States, stated that Tolton's request for seminary admission came a mere ten years too early.

Refusing to give up, the Franciscans at St Francis Solanus College finally arranged for Tolton to study at the Pontifical Urban University in Rome. On 21 February 1880, Tolton boarded the ship Der Westlicher and sailed from Hoboken, New Jersey, to Le Havre, France. He arrived in Rome on 10 March, 1880, and reported to the Pontifical Urban University on 12 March 1880. There, he became as fluent in the Italian language as he had already become in Ecclesiastical Latin, German, and Greek.

== Priesthood ==
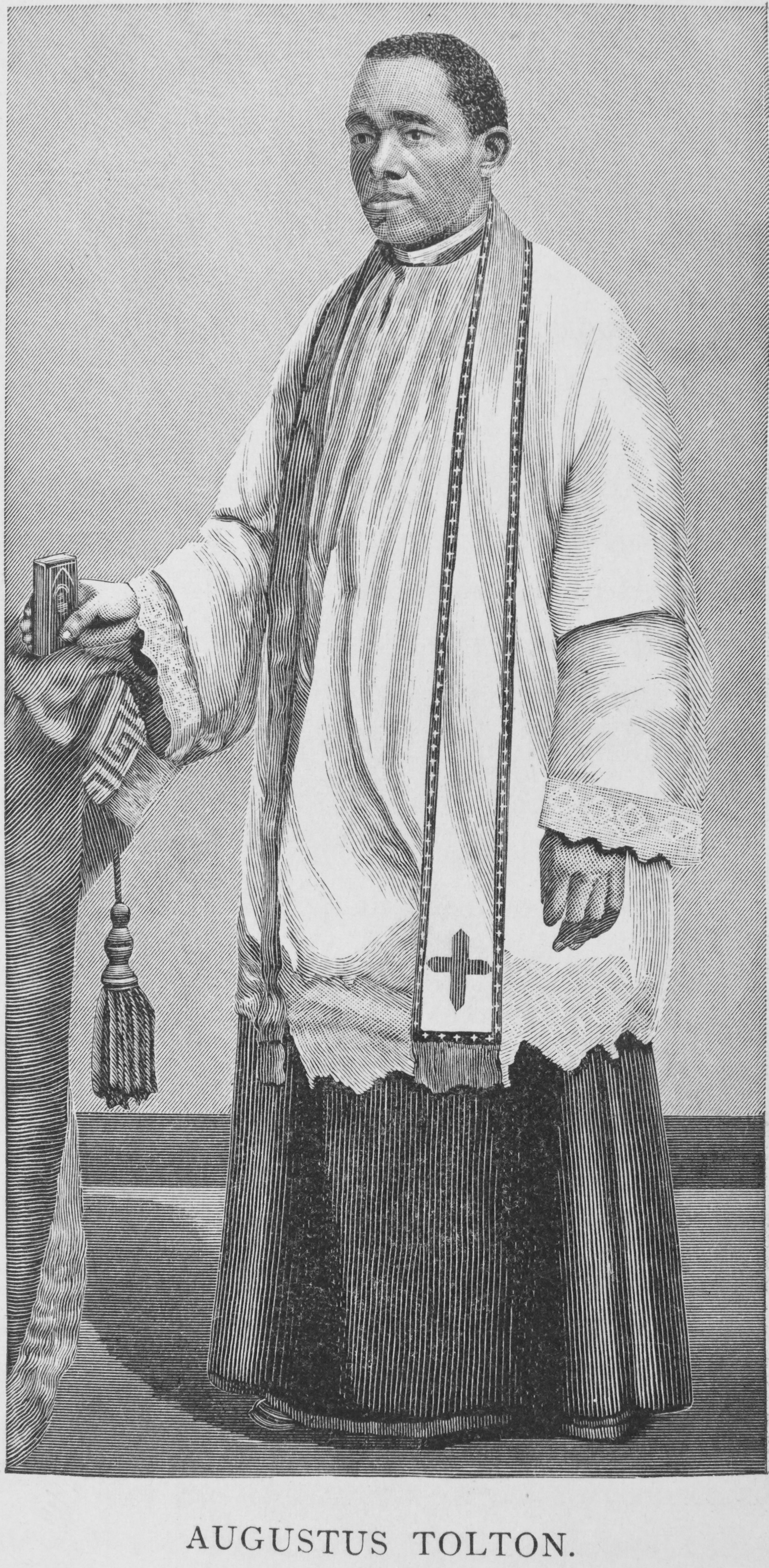
Tolton in 1887

Tolton was ordained to the priesthood in Rome on April 24, 1886 at age 31 in the Archbasilica of Saint John Lateran. His first public Mass was inside St. Peter's Basilica on Easter Sunday, 1886. Expecting to serve as a missionary priest in the midst of the ongoing Scramble for Africa, Tolton had carefully studied his ancestral continent's regional cultures and languages.

Tolton's plans, however, ran into an unexpected roadblock in the person of Cardinal Giovanni Simeoni, the Prefect of the Congregation for the Propagation of the Faith. As early as November 1883, Cardinal Simeoni, as the head of the Catholic Church's global missionary network, had summoned all the bishops of the Catholic Church in the United States, which was still considered a mission territory, to Rome. During their meeting with him, the Cardinal had shared a list of twelve concerns he wished the American Bishops to address. In particular, Simeoni, "noted that little had been done for emancipated slaves since the last Council. [He] also proposed a special collection in parishes that would benefit missions to Blacks in America."

This is why, when a newly ordained Tolton was redirected to return to the United States to serve as a Catholic missionary to the Black community, Cardinal Simeoni quipped, while, issuing the order in a document that still survives in the Vatican archives, "America has been called the most enlightened nation. We will see if it deserves the honor. If America has never seen a Negro priest, it will see one now."

Tolton offered his first Mass on American soil at St. Mary's Hospital in Hoboken, New Jersey on July 7, 1886. He then offered a Solemn High Mass at St. Benedict the Moor Catholic Church in Hell's Kitchen, Manhattan, New York City on 11 July 1886.

His first Mass in Quincy was on July 18, 1886 at St. Boniface. He attempted to organize an African-American parish in the city, but over the years, met with resistance from both White ethnic Catholics (many of whom were German-Americans) as well as African American Protestant ministers, who feared members of their congregations defecting to Catholicism. The pastor at St. Boniface, Fr Michael Weiss, was among Tolton's main detractors. He organized St. Joseph Catholic Church and school in Quincy but ran into opposition from the new dean of the parish, who wanted white worshipers turned away from his Masses.

After successfully requesting a transfer to the Archdiocese of Chicago in 1889, Tolton led a mission society, St. Augustine's, which met in the basement of St. Mary's Church. He also led the development and administration of the Negro "national parish" of St. Monica's Catholic Church, built between 1893 and 1894 at 36th and Dearborn Streets on the South Side. The church seated 850 parishioners and was built with money from philanthropists Mrs. Anne O'Neill and Katharine Drexel. St. Monica's Parish grew from 30 parishioners to 600 with the construction of the new church building. Tolton's success at ministering to Black Catholics quickly earned him national attention within the Catholic hierarchy. "Good Father Gus," as he was called by many, was known for his "eloquent sermons, his beautiful singing voice, and his talent for playing the accordion."

Several contemporaneous news articles describe his personal qualities and importance. An 1893 article in the Lewiston Daily Sun, written while he worked to establish St. Monica's for African American Catholics in Chicago, said:

"Father Tolton ... is a fluent and graceful talker and has a singing voice of exceptional sweetness, which shows to good advantage in the chants of the high Mass. It is no unusual thing for many white people to be seen among his congregation."

Among Chicago’s Catholics, Tolton found a warm welcome from the Jesuits of Holy Family Church and St. Ignatius College (now St. Ignatius College Prep). They invited him to stay in the Jesuit residence in the 1869 school building and to preach at the High Mass at Holy Family on January 29, 1893. Holy Family was then the largest English-speaking parish in Chicago, composed primarily of South Side Irish, who were also struggling to establish a home in the sometimes unwelcoming city. Tolton appealed “at all the masses” and collected $500 ($14,000 in 2020) for St. Monica Church, which was dedicated on January 14, 1894. The True Witness and Catholic Chronicle in 1894 described him as "indefatigable" in his efforts to establish the new parish. Daniel Rudd, who organized the initial Colored Catholic Congress in 1889, was quoted in the November 8, 1888, edition of The Irish Canadian as commenting about the Congress by saying:

"For a long time the idea prevailed that the negro was not wanted beyond the altar rail, and for that reason, no doubt, hundreds of young colored men who would otherwise be officiating at the altar rail today have entered other walks. Now that this mistaken idea has been dispelled by the advent of one full-blooded negro priest, the Rev. Augustus Tolton, many more have entered the seminaries in this country and Europe."

Tolton would go on to say Mass at the Congress itself, held in Washington, D.C. Another indication of the prominence given Tolton by parts of the American Catholic hierarchy was his participation, a few months later, on the altar at an international celebration of the centenary of the first Catholic Diocese in the United States. Writing about it in the New York Times edition of November 11, 1889, the correspondent noted:

"As Cardinal Gibbons retired to his dais [on the altar at the Mass], the reporters in the improvised press gallery noticed for the first time, not six feet away from him in the sanctuary among the abbots and other special dignitaries, the Black face of Father Tolton of Chicago, the first African American Catholic priest ordained in America."

== Death ==
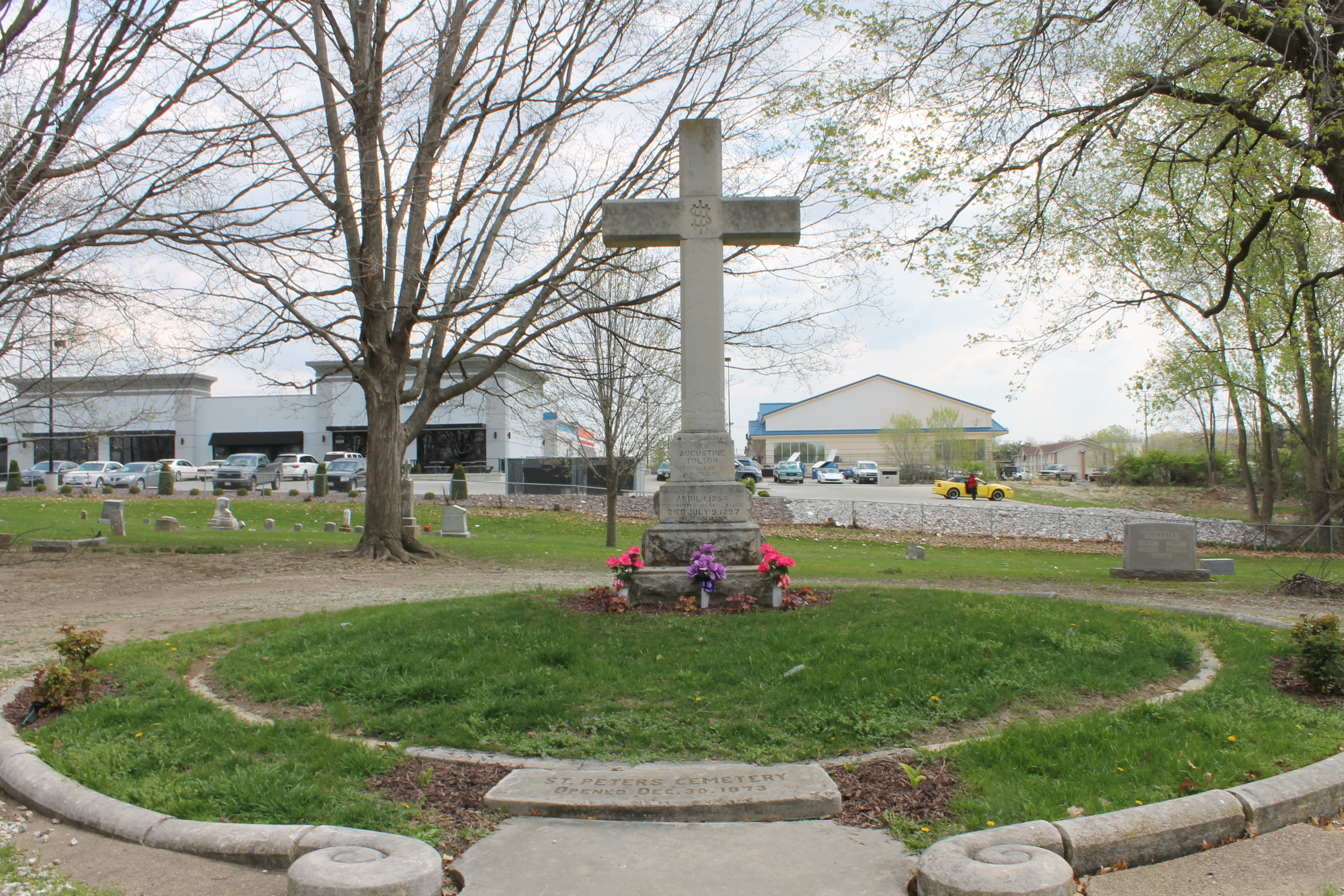
Tolton's grave in Quincy, Illinois.

Tolton began to be plagued by "spells of illness" in 1893. Because of them, he was forced to take a temporary leave of absence from his duties at St. Monica's Parish in 1895.

At the age of 43, on July 8, 1897, he collapsed and died the following day at Mercy Hospital as a result of the heat wave in Chicago in 1897. After a funeral which included 100 priests, Tolton was buried in the priests' lot in St. Peter's Cemetery in Quincy, which had been his expressed wish.

After Tolton's death, St. Monica's was made a mission of St. Elizabeth's Church. In 1924 it was closed as a national parish, as Black Catholics chose to attend parish churches in their neighborhoods.

== Legacy and honors ==
- Tolton is the subject of the 1973 biography From Slave to Priest by Sister Caroline Hemesath. The book was reissued by Ignatius Press in 2006. According to more recent Tolton biographer Joyce Duriga, "Even though Sister Hemesath used creative license in creating dialogue between Tolton and others that doesn't actually exist, I am grateful for her popular history that introduced me and thousands of others to this powerful story."
- In 1990, Sister Jamie T. Phelps, O.P., an Adrian Dominican Sister and then-faculty member of the Theology Department at Catholic Theological Union, initiated the Augustus Tolton Pastoral Ministry Program in consultation with Don Senior, President of CTU, the theology faculty, and representatives of the Archdiocese of Chicago, to prepare, educate, and form Black Catholic laity for ministerial leadership in the Archdiocese of Chicago.
- The Father Tolton Regional Catholic High School opened in Columbia, Missouri, in 2011.
- Augustus Tolton Catholic Academy opened in the fall of 2015 in Chicago, Illinois. Tolton Academy is the first STREAM school in the Archdiocese of Chicago. A focus on science, technology, religion, engineering, arts, and math sets it apart as a premier elementary school in Chicago. Tolton Academy is located at St. Columbanus Church.
- The Diocese of Springfield in Illinois announced in 2026 that a national shrine to honor Tolton will be built in Quincy.

== Cause for beatification and canonization ==
On March 1, 2010, Cardinal Francis George of Chicago announced that he was beginning an official investigation into Tolton's life and virtues with a view to opening the cause for his canonization. This cause for sainthood is also being advanced by the Diocese of Springfield in Illinois, where Tolton first served as priest, as well as the Diocese of Jefferson City, where his family was enslaved.

February 24, 2011, marked the formal introduction of the cause for Tolton's sainthood, and he received the title Servant of God. Historical and theological commissions were established at this time to investigate his life, along with the Father Tolton Guild, which is responsible for the promotion of his cause through spiritual and financial endeavors. Cardinal George assigned Joseph Perry, Auxiliary Bishop of Chicago, to be the diocesan postulator for the cause of Tolton's canonization.

On September 29, 2014, Cardinal George formally closed the investigation into the life and virtues of Tolton. The dossier of research into Tolton's life went to the Vatican, where the documents collected to support his cause were analyzed, bound into a book called a positio or official position paper, evaluated by theologians, and then passed to the pope.

On December 10, 2016, Tolton's remains were exhumed and verified as part of the beatification process. Following procedures laid out in canon law, a forensic pathologist verified that the remains (which included a skull, femurs, ribs, vertebrae, pelvis, and portions of arm bones) belong to Tolton. Also found were the corpus from a crucifix, part of a Roman collar, the corpus from Tolton's rosary, and glass shards indicating his coffin had a glass top. After verification, the remains were dressed in a new chasuble and reburied.

On March 8, 2018, historians who consult the Congregation for the Causes of Saints unanimously issued their assent to Tolton's cause after receiving and favorably reviewing the positio presented to them. On February 5, 2019, the nine-member theological commission unanimously voted to approve the cause. It then went to the cardinal and bishop members of the Congregation for approval before being passed to the pope for his final confirmation.

On June 12, 2019, Pope Francis authorized the promulgation of a Decree of Heroic Virtue, advancing Tolton's cause. With the promulgation of the decree of heroic virtue, Tolton was granted the title Venerable. If the cause progresses, the next stage will be beatification, followed by canonization.

== See also ==
- List of enslaved people
