= William Augustine Williams =

African-American linguist, librarian, and seminarian

William A. Williams
- Born: William Williams; May 26, 1836
- Died: May 21, 1901 (aged 64); New York City
- Burial place: Calvary Cemetery (Queens)
- Other names: Gullielmus Williams; William Augustine Willyams/Willyms
- Education: Pontifical Urban University
- Occupations: Barber, educator, sacristan, and librarian
- Known for: First openly Black Catholic seminarian from the United States

William Augustine Williams (also William Augustine Willyams/Willyms or Gullielmus Williams; May 26, 1836 – May 21, 1901) was an African-American linguist, librarian, Catholic seminarian, and public figure. He was the first openly African-American Catholic seminarian—preceding Augustus Tolton—but was never ordained, having left Rome's Pontifical Urban University in 1862 after facing racist opposition to his prospective ministry in the United States.

Born in 1836, Williams became a barber, a Catholic, and a seminarian in quick succession, moving to Rome for priesthood studies in 1855. He remained there for the better part of a decade before returning to Baltimore in 1862, where he briefly attempted a number of religious projects (including a continued aspiration for the priesthood) before turning to secular work.

He would become a teacher, writer, speaker on the subject Black librarianship at Enoch Pratt Free Library and the Catholic University of America, and was at one point recommended to President Ulysses S. Grant as the US ambassador to Liberia.

Later in life he moved to New York City (in 1899), where he served as sacristan at the historic St. Benedict the Moor Church. He was published in the New York Times shortly before his death in 1901 at the age of 65. In an obituary, he was termed "the best-known Negro in New York".

== Biography ==
=== Early life ===
Williams was born on May 26, 1836, in the DC area, though records differ on exactly where (some sources say Virginia, whereas others say DC itself).

Sources also differ on the nature of his upbringing, with some saying his father was a slave on the Mount Vernon plantation belonging to the family of George Washington, while another says his father was the owner.

Williams was raised Baptist, but at some point became connected to the Catholic religion and the local priests—Fr. Thaddeus Anwander, CSsR, in particular—who took an interest in him for his keen schoolwork and interest in the priesthood.

During this time, Williams worked as a barber and is thought to have been involved with the Oblate Sisters of Providence, who were also associated with Fr. Anwander; Williams received the sacrament of Confirmation in Baltimore at the Oblates' chapel on May 28, 1852.

=== Seminary ===
In 1853, on the recommendation of Fr. Anwander, Williams obtained sponsorship for the seminary from Bishops Louis Rappe of Cleveland and Peter Richard Kenrick of Baltimore, himself a slaveholder.

Even as early as this point Williams faced opposition, with Archbishop John Hughes of New York speaking against Williams being sent to seminary if it meant he might end up actually serving as a priest in the United States. (Hughes felt the racist dictums of the day were not worth combating in this fashion, as White Catholics stateside would likely take umbrage to the idea of a Black priest.)

Nevertheless, the Vatican's Propaganda office accepted Williams for studies—U.S. seminaries did not admit Blacks at this time—and Williams arrived in Rome in 1855 (having been refused lodging at the Redemptorist seminary in Paris along the way). He spent eight years in Rome at the Urban College, and two in France, England, and Ireland. He became known during this time as "the pope's little Black". His classmates included the future archbishop Michael Corrigan and Fr. Edward McGlynn.

While overseas, Williams was repeatedly coached by his stateside sponsors to not give any indication that he wished to be a priest in the U.S.; instead, they instructed, he was to volunteer suggestions such as Haiti (the bishops themselves were directly recommending similar options to the Propaganda, one being Liberia).

By August 1862, shortly after the outbreak of the Civil War, Williams had submitted a letter of resignation to the Propaganda, saying that he had decided "after mature deliberation and on the advice of his teachers" that he had no calling to the priesthood and would return home. His obituary would cite the war itself as the reason for his decision to drop out, implying that the prevailing tensions would have hindered his ability to minister in the South.

=== Baltimore ===
Upon his return to Baltimore, Williams requested citizenship in the Papal States and informed the Propaganda that he still intended to someday become a priest. This idea had faded by 1867, the beginning of Reconstruction.

While there, Williams took on a number of businesses and ministries, including two Black schools and a freedmen's newspaper called Clear Communicator, one of the first of its kind. After giving up on the priesthood, he attempted unsuccessfully in 1868 to start a religious order for Black males. During this time, he was associated with historic St. Francis Xavier Church in Baltimore.

While teaching, Williams began receiving a number of accolades, and was in 1876 recommended to President Ulysses S. Grant by Bishop Alexander Walker Wayman (of the African Methodist Episcopal Church) to—ironically enough—serve as U.S. ambassador to Liberia.

Williams also received an award from a literary association in January 1878 (at an event attended by Senator Ambrose Burnside) for an essay he wrote, "The Future of the Negro in America", that included a proposal for a monument to Benjamin Banneker.

Having gained a unique amount of education for African Americans in his era, Williams also took on a number of other jobs, including as a foreign language tutor (being fluent in Latin, Italian, and French). He taught French to David Dickson, a janitor-turned-lawyer associated with the Enoch Pratt Free Library—where Williams would later become the second Black employee (as a librarian) in the early- to mid-1880s.

Williams would later become sacristan and librarian at the Catholic University of America, where he also was once referred to in The New York Age as a professor.

=== New York ===
In 1886, Venerable Fr. Augustus Tolton had been ordained in Rome, becoming the first openly African-American Catholic priest in history; his first Mass in the US was celebrated that July at St. Benedict the Moor Church in New York City. Having a devotion to St Benedict, Williams would visit the church, conversing with the sacristan in Italian.

Williams moved from DC to Manhattan in 1899, joining the parish and becoming sacristan himself. There he would reunite geographically with his former classmate Archbishop Corrigan, who had headed the New York archdiocese since 1885.

Williams was a prolific writer by this time, and had an essay entitled "The Polite West Indian Negro" published in The New York Times in the year of his arrival to the city. He also began a translation of the biography of St. Benedict into English from Italian.

=== Death ===
Williams died on May 21, 1901, five days shy of his 66th birthday. His funeral was held at St Benedict the Moor and he was buried on June 2 in Section 4, Range 14, Plot W, Grave 12, at Calvary Cemetery in Queens.

== Personal life ==
Williams is not known to have ever married, and the only family listed at the time of his death was a sister in Cleveland.

== See also ==
- Black Catholicism
- Healy family
- Augustus Tolton
- Oblate Sisters of Providence
