= St. Benedict the Moor Church (New York City) =

19th-century Catholic church in New York City

Coordinates: 40°45′52.81″N 73°59′11.61″W

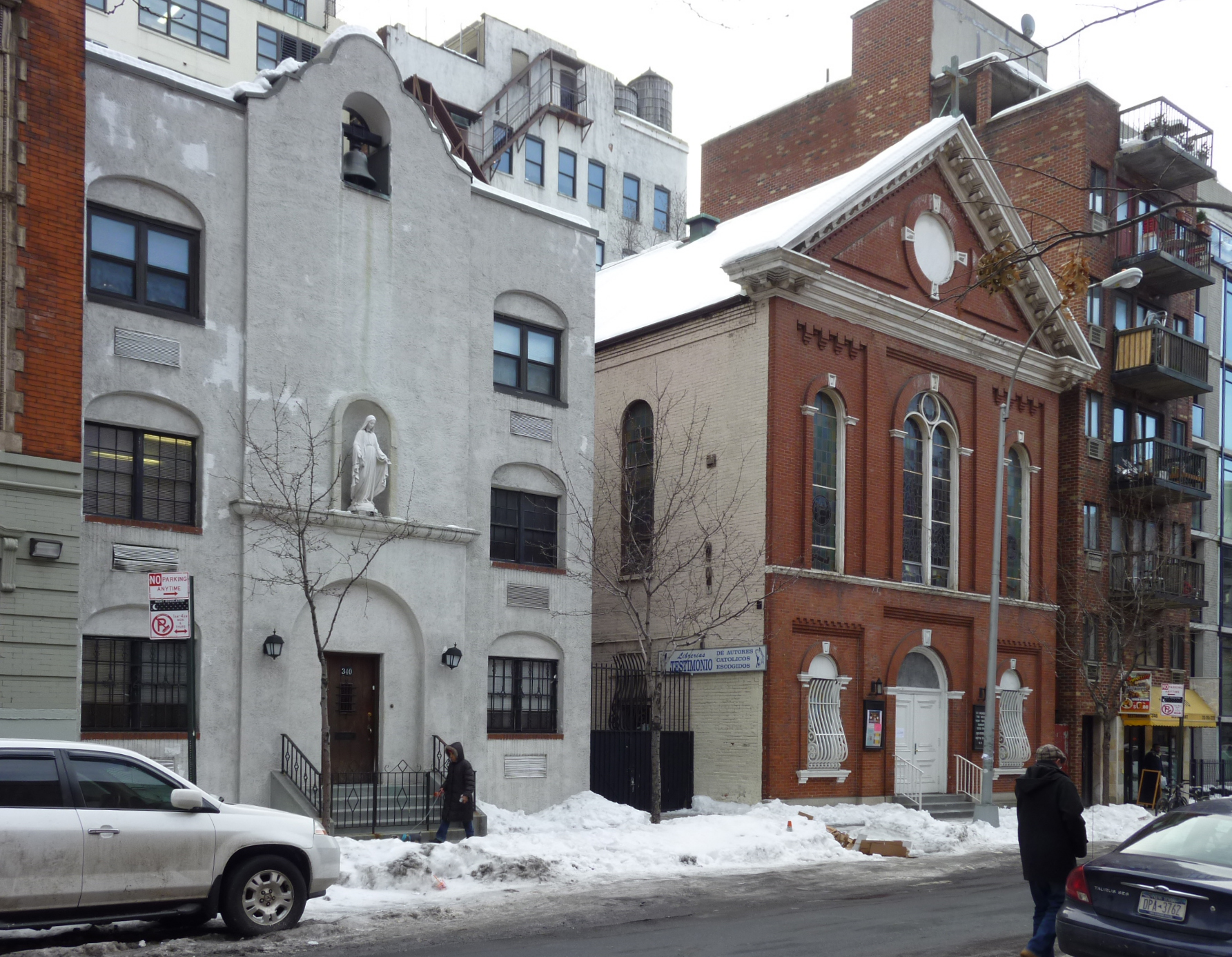
- St. Benedict the Moor Church at 342 West 53rd Street (to right) and the rectory at 338–342 West 53rd Street (to left), which was built in 1965 to the designs of architect Joseph Mitchell
- Interactive map of the St. Benedict the Moor Church area

General information
- Architectural style: Italianate (church)
- Location: 342 W 53rd Street, Hell's Kitchen / Clinton, Manhattan, New York City, United States
- Completed: 1869 (church); 1965 (for rectory)
- Cost: $220,000 (for 1965 rectory)
- Client: Archdiocese of New York

Design and construction
- Architects: 1965 rectory: Joseph Mitchell

St. Benedict the Moor Church was a Black Catholic parish church in the Archdiocese of New York, located at 342 West 53rd Street, Hell's Kitchen, Manhattan (Clinton), New York City. The property was sold to a developer in 2023.

== Parish ==
In 1883 a Black Catholic mission parish named after St. Benedict the Moor was established, based on a $5,000 bequest by Fr Thomas Farrell to serve the African-American community in Lower Manhattan; his will and testament specified that if the Catholic Church was unable to spend funds for this purpose, it would instead go to the Protestant Colored Orphan Asylum. It was the first church in the city for black Catholics and the first north of the Mason–Dixon line.

In 1892, the parish took over the former Third Universalist Church at 210 Bleecker Street, at a time when many African Americans lived in southern Manhattan. It renamed that church for its parish. Upon leaving the church on Bleecker Street, the building became occupied by Our Lady of Pompeii Church.

Fr Augustus Tolton, the first openly-Black Catholic priest in the United States, celebrated his first Mass in America at this parish in 1886. A little over a decade later, the first openly-Black Catholic seminarian, William Augustine Williams (who entered the seminary in Rome in 1853 and departed in 1862), became the parish sacristan.

As the black population moved north, in 1898 the parish took over the former Second German Church of the Evangelical Association at 342 W. 53rd Street in Hell's Kitchen, renaming it as St. Benedict the Moor Church. More change came by the end of the next two decades. In the 1920s, many of the parishioners moved with other African Americans to Harlem, which became a center of African-American life.

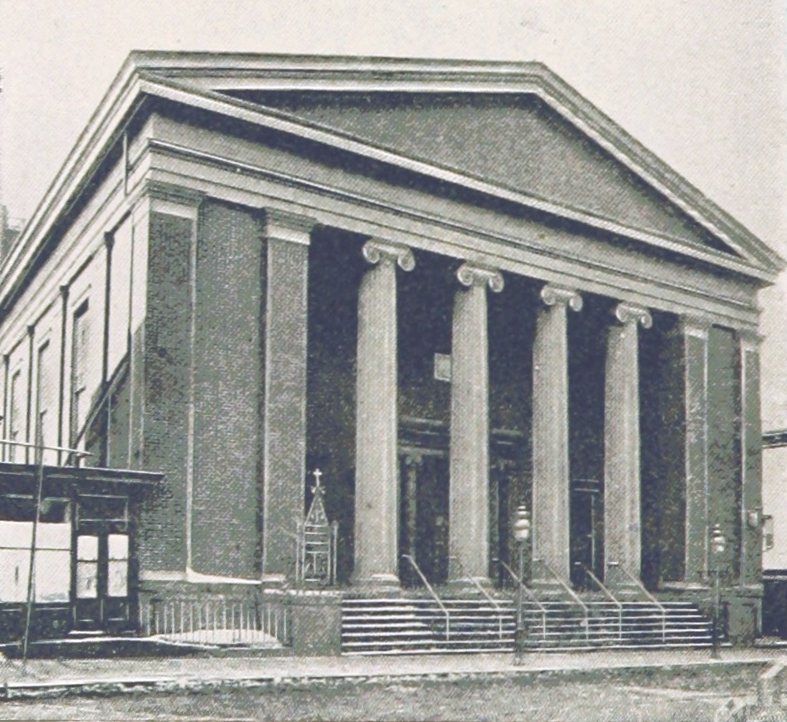
Church of St. Benedict the Moor, 210 Bleecker Street, in 1893

After 1953, the church was staffed by Spanish friars of the Third Order of Saint Francis and was rededicated in 1954. The parish was later reduced to mission status, and is maintained by members of the new Lumen Christi congregation. Although recommended for closure during an initial review, the Archdiocese announced on January 19, 2007, that the church would retain its parish status.

On June 30, 2017, the church was deconsecrated. It was sold to a developer in 2023.

== Buildings ==
The Italianate-style red brick pedimented church was built in 1869, designed by R.C. McLane & Sons for the Second German Church of the Evangelical Association. A three-storey rectory at 338–342 West 53rd Street was built in 1965 to the designs of Joseph Mitchell, of 355 West 54th Street, for $220,000. That rectory reused the statue of the Virgin Mary with outstretched arms from the church.
