= St. Peter's Catholic Church (Rensselaer, Missouri) =

Historic church in Missouri, United States

- U.S. National Register of Historic Places
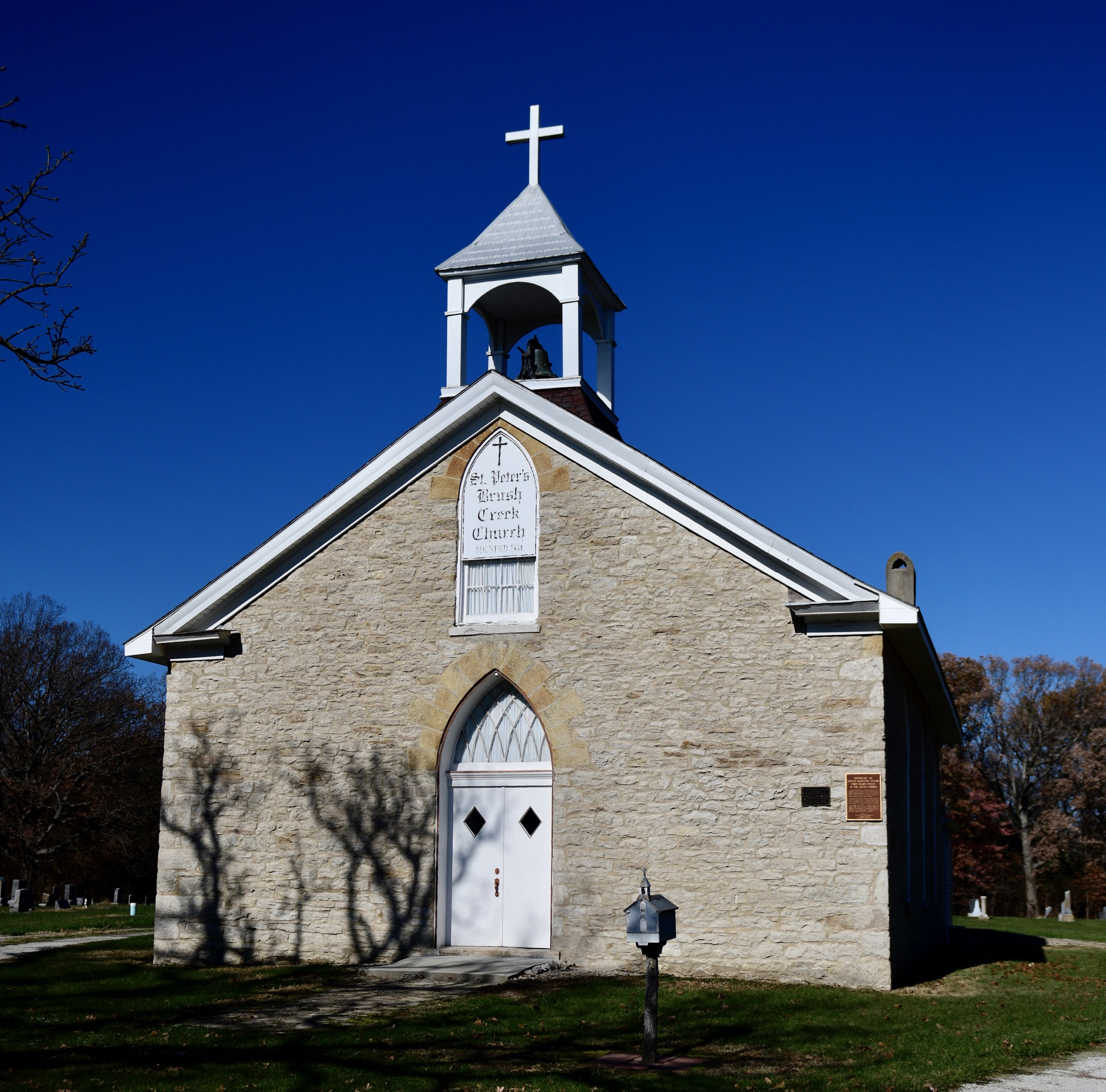

- Location within Missouri Location within the United States
- Location: Southwest of Rensselaer on Route 2, near Rensselaer, Missouri
- Coordinates: 39°37′11″N 91°36′14″W
- Area: 2.5 acres (1.0 ha)
- Built: 1862
- Built by: Kielty, Rev. Francis M.; Hogan, Martin
- NRHP reference No.: 80002392
- Added to NRHP: November 14, 1980

St. Peter's Catholic Church, also known as Brush Creek Church, is a historic Catholic church near Rensselaer, Ralls County, Missouri.

After an original building constructed in 1845, the current church was built about 1862, and is a one-story, rectangular limestone building with limestone and sandstone ornamentation. It is topped by a gable roof with belfry.It features lancet windows and has a frame two-room addition sheathed in weatherboard.

The church is where Augustus Tolton, the first openly African-American Catholic priest, was baptized; he has since been put on the path to sainthood. The church was closed in 1968, reduced to the status of a chapel, and listed on the National Register of Historic Places in 1980. A memorial to the enslaved buried in the church's cemetery was blessed in 2025.
