= John Huston Ricard =

Black American Catholic prelate (1940–2026)

His Excellency, The Most Reverend John Huston Ricard SSJ
- Bishop Emeritus of Pensacola–Tallahassee
- Diocese: Pensacola–Tallahassee
- Appointed: January 20, 1997
- Installed: March 13, 1997
- Retired: March 11, 2011
- Predecessor: John Mortimer Smith
- Successor: Gregory Parkes
- Other posts: Superior General, Society of St. Joseph of the Sacred Heart (2019–2026)
- Previous posts: Auxiliary Bishop of Baltimore and Titular Bishop of Rucuma (1984–1997)

Orders
- Ordination: May 25, 1968 by Robert Emmet Tracy
- Consecration: July 2, 1984 by William Donald Borders, Thomas Austin Murphy, and Eugene Antonio Marino

Personal details
- Born: February 29, 1940 New Roads, Louisiana, U.S.
- Died: May 20, 2026 (aged 86) Washington, D.C., U.S.
- Education: St. Vincent Seminary; St. Joseph's Seminary; Tulane University; Catholic University of America
- Motto: God is gracious

Styles of John Huston Ricard
- Reference style: His Excellency; The Most Reverend
- Spoken style: Your Excellency
- Religious style: Bishop

John Huston Ricard (February 29, 1940 – May 20, 2026) was an American Catholic prelate who served as superior general of the Society of St. Joseph of the Sacred Heart from 2019 until his death in 2026. He previously served as Bishop of Pensacola-Tallahassee from 1997 to 2011, and as an auxiliary bishop for the Archdiocese of Baltimore from 1984 to 1997.

== Biography ==
=== Early life and education ===
Born on February 29, 1940, in New Roads, Louisiana, Ricard was of Creole descent. Ricard is a cousin of Archbishop Shelton Fabre of Louisville. After graduating from Xavier University Preparatory School in New Orleans in 1958, he joined the Josephites, entering the Mary Immaculate Novitiate in Walden, New York. Ricard then attended Epiphany Apostolic College in Newburgh, New York. He completed his theological studies at St. Joseph's Seminary in Washington, D.C.

=== Priestly ministry ===
On May 25, 1968. Ricard was ordained to the priesthood by Bishop Robert Tracy for the Josephites. After his ordination, the Josephites assigned Ricard as an associate pastor at St. Peter Claver Parish in New Orleans. In 1970, he earned a master's degree from Tulane University in New Orleans.

In 1972, the Josephites sent Ricard to Washington to serve as pastor of Holy Redeemer Parish. He was moved in 1975 to become pastor at Holy Comforter-St. Cyprian Parish in Washington. In 1976, Ricard was also appointed an instructor at the National Catholic School of Social Service at The Catholic University of America in Washington, serving there until 1978.

In 1979, Ricard was appointed pastor of Our Lady of Perpetual Help Parish in Washington. He was awarded a doctorate from Catholic University in 1983. He also studied at the Washington School for Psychotherapy and worked as a psychotherapist in Southeast Washington, D.C.

==== Auxiliary Bishop of Baltimore ====
On May 25, 1984, Pope John Paul II appointed Ricard as an auxiliary bishop of Baltimore and Titular Bishop of Rucuma. He was consecrated on July 2, 1984, at the Cathedral of Mary Our Queen in Baltimore by Archbishop William Borders.

In 1987, Ricard was instrumental in the revival of the Colored Catholic Congress movement, being the legal representative for the National Black Catholic Congress (NBCC) upon its incorporation. He served as NBCC president from that time until 2019.

=== Bishop of Pensacola-Tallahassee ===
On January 20, 1997, John Paul II appointed Ricard as bishop of Pensacola-Tallahassee. He was installed on March 13, 1997.On May 14, 2004, Ricard issued a statement denouncing what he termed the "abuse and torture" by US military forces of Iraqi combatants captured during the Iraqi insurgency.

=== Committees ===
During his time as bishop, Ricard served as chair of Catholic Relief Services from 1995 to 2002, as a member of Pontifical Council Cor Unum in Rome, and as chair of the USCCB's Committee on Social Development and World Peace from 1992 to 1995. He was also a member of the USCCB's Secretariat of Black Catholics.

=== Health and retirement ===
On December 22, 2009, Ricard suffered a stroke and was treated at Ascension Sacred Heart Hospital of Pensacola.

Ricard tendered his letter of resignation as bishop of Pensacola-Tallahassee to Pope Benedict XVI in February 2011, citing poor health. The pope accepted Ricard's resignation on March 11, 2011.

=== Josephite administration ===
In June 2011, Ricard was appointed rector of his alma mater, St. Joseph's Seminary. In June 2019, Ricard was elected as superior general of the Josephites. On November 24, 2021, Ricard issued a statement with Archbishop Wilton Gregory calling for justice following the 2020 murder of Ahmaud Arbery by three men in a suburb of Brunswick, Georgia. Ricard was reelected as superior general of the Josephites in 2023.

=== Death ===
Ricard died in Washington, DC, on May 20, 2026, at the age of 86.

== See also ==
- Catholic Church hierarchy
- Catholic Church in the United States
- Historical list of the Catholic bishops of the United States
- List of Catholic bishops of the United States
- Lists of patriarchs, archbishops, and bishops

== Episcopal succession ==
Catholic Church titles
Preceded by John Mortimer Smith	Bishop of Pensacola-Tallahassee; 1997–2011	Succeeded by Gregory Lawrence Parkes
Preceded by Patrick Fani Chakaipa	Titular Bishop of Rucuma; 1984–1997	Succeeded by Thomas Maria Renz
Preceded by -	Auxiliary Bishop of Baltimore; 1984–1997	Succeeded by -
