= Eugene Antonio Marino =

American prelate

His Excellency, The Most Reverend Eugene Antonio Marino SSJ
- Archbishop of Atlanta
- See: Atlanta
- Installed: May 5, 1988
- Term ended: July 10, 1990
- Predecessor: Thomas Andrew Donnellan
- Successor: James Patterson Lyke, OFM
- Previous post: Auxiliary Bishop of Washington (1974–88)

Orders
- Ordination: June 9, 1962 by Philip Hannan
- Consecration: September 12, 1974 by William Wakefield Baum

Personal details
- Born: May 29, 1934 Biloxi, Mississippi, US
- Died: November 12, 2000 (aged 66) Manhasset, New York, US
- Education: Epiphany Apostolic College; St. Joseph's Seminary; Fordham University
- Motto: Feed my lambs

Styles of Eugene Antonio Marino
- Reference style: His Excellency; The Most Reverend
- Spoken style: Your Excellency
- Religious style: Bishop

Eugene Antonio Marino, SSJ (May 29, 1934 – November 12, 2000) was an American Catholic prelate who served as Archbishop of Atlanta from 1988 until 1990. He previously served as an auxiliary bishop of the Archdiocese of Washington from 1974 to 1988. He was the first African-American Catholic archbishop in history and the first African-American bishop in Washington. Marino was a member of the Josephites.

Marino resigned as archbishop of Atlanta in 1990, under accusations of having a sexual relationship with a female lay minister. He later worked as a chaplain and counselor in New York until his death in 2000.

== Biography ==
=== Early life and education ===
Marino was born on May 29, 1934, in Biloxi, Mississippi, the sixth of eight children to Jesús María Marino, a baker, and Lottie Irene Bradford Marino, a maid. He attended parochial schools in Biloxi before joining the Josephites.

Marino attended Epiphany Apostolic College in Baltimore, Maryland, and later earned his master's degree from St. Joseph's Seminary in Washington, D.C.. He also completed a master's degree in religious education at Fordham University in the Bronx.

=== Priesthood ===
Marino was ordained a priest for the Josephites at the Basilica of the National Shrine of the Immaculate Conception in Washington, D.C. on June 9, 1962, by Bishop Philip Hannan.

After his ordination, Marino taught religion and physical science at Epiphany College in Newburgh, New York, for seven years. He served as the spiritual director at St. Joseph's Seminary in Washington, D.C., from 1968 until 1971, when he was appointed vicar general of the Josephites.

=== Auxiliary Bishop of Washington ===
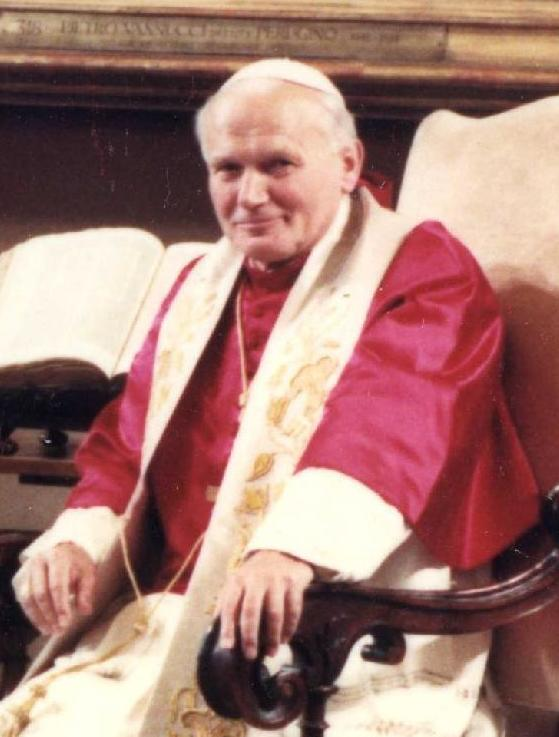
Pope John Paul II (1984)

On July 12, 1974, Marino was named an auxiliary bishop of Washington by Pope Paul VI. He was consecrated at the Basilica of the National Shrine of the Immaculate Conception by Cardinal William Baum on September 12, 1974, with Bishops Harold Perry and Edward John Herrmann serving as co-consecrators.

In 1984, Marino authored a pastoral letter on evangelization by the African-American bishops. Marino was named the secretary of the National Conference of Catholic Bishops in 1985, the first African-American to hold that position. Fordham University in 1986 awarded Marino an honorary Doctor of Laws degree.

In 1987, Marino organized a trip for African-American Catholics to see Pope John Paul II. During a talk with these men and women, he stated:

Up as a young boy in Mississippi, with the double—I was going to say handicap, but I'll say blessing—of being black and Catholic, I never thought I would see the day when I would be standing here preaching God's holy word in this place, as a priest, indeed as a bishop. Generations of black Catholics never lived to see a black priest or sister, let alone ever dream that their son or daughter might become one.

=== Archbishop of Atlanta ===
John Paul II appointed Marino as the archbishop of Atlanta on March 14, 1988. He was installed on May 5, 1988, becoming the first African-American archbishop. He would later be involved in efforts to address the sexual misconduct of priests.

=== Resignation and legacy ===
In May 1990, Marino suffered chest pains while visiting New York. His doctors prescribed rest and seclusion. Marino resigned as archbishop on July 10, 1990, citing the need for "spiritual renewal, psychological therapy and medical supervision". He then underwent a six-week-long period of counseling. Over 25,000 Catholics sent him letters of support in a campaign orchestrated by African-American Catholic leaders.

In August 1990, Vicki Long, a female lay minister, claimed that she and Marino had been engaged in a personal relationship while he was an auxiliary bishop in Washington. She had originally sought counseling with Marino after having a sexual relationship with a priest in Savannah, Georgia. Long said she and Marino exchanged rings in a secret ceremony in 1988.

After finishing his treatment following the scandal, Marino quietly moved to Alma, Michigan, to serve as chaplain for the Sisters of Mercy. In 1995, he moved to Harrison, New York, to work at St. Vincent's Hospital Westchester, counseling patients on sexual behavior and substance abuse. He was also employed as a counselor and confidant for fellow priests and nuns at Salesian High School in New Rochelle, New York. In 1999, Cardinal John O'Connor honored Marino in a small ceremony at St. Patrick's Cathedral in New York City on the 25th anniversary of his appointment as bishop.

On November 12, 2000, Marino died at age 66 in the St. Ignatius Retreat House in Manhasset, New York, of a heart attack. He was buried in Biloxi, Mississippi. Of his eight siblings, one brother and four sisters survived him.

Catholic Church titles
Preceded by Thomas Andrew Donnellan	Archbishop of Atlanta; 1988–1990	Succeeded by James Patterson Lyke
