= Epiphany Apostolic College =

Catholic seminary in Baltimore

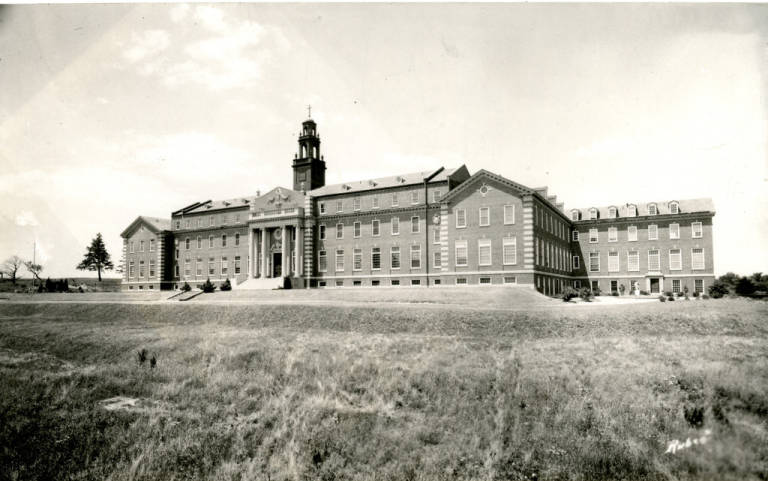
- Epiphany Apostolic College's second and final location, in New York.

Religion
- Affiliation: Catholic Church
- Rite: Latin Church
- Ecclesiastical or organisational status: defunct
- Patron: Epiphany

Location
- Location: New Windsor, New York (formerly Baltimore)
- Country: United States

Architecture
- Established: 1889 (Baltimore)

Epiphany Apostolic College, formerly known as the Josephite Collegiate Seminary, was a Catholic minor seminary founded in Baltimore, Maryland in 1889.

== History ==
The seminary was founded in 1889 by Fr John R. Slattery of the Mill Hill Missionaries, an English Catholic society of apostolic life. The seminary soon came under the service of the Josephites, an American offshoot of the Mill Hills serving African Americans, cofounded by Slattery. Charles Uncles, the first African-American Catholic priest trained and ordained in the United States, and a cofounder of the Josephites, studied at Epiphany.

After Uncles, the young priest Dominic James Manley, also a Josephite cofounder, served as president of Epiphany from 1889 to October 1893. Born in Ireland and raised in Scranton, Pennsylvania, Manley died in office at the age of 39. He had been a diocesan priest before joining the Josephites.

Fr Lambert A. Welbers, another Josephite cofounder, served as Epiphany president from 1901 to March 1903. He later became pastor of St. Peter Claver Mission in Tyler, Texas. At Epiphany, he was succeeded by Fr Robert J. Carse, who went on to become pastor of St. Patrick Parish in St. Charles, Illinois, for 41 years and died in 1950. Another early president was Fr Thomas B. Donovan, and Fr Thomas J. Duffy around 1909.

The seminary later moved to New Windsor, New York, in 1925. For several decades in the early to late 20th century, racial politics led to the seminary being closed to most African Americans.

Epiphany was merged into the former Our Lady of Hope Seminary in Newburgh in 1970. It later became Epiphany Apostolic High School, which closed in 1975. It is now the site of a public middle school, Heritage Middle School, of the Newburgh Enlarged City School District.

== Notable alumni ==
- Antoine Garibaldi
- Archbishop Eugene A. Marino
- Bishop John H. Ricard
- Bishop Carl A. Fisher
- Bishop Joseph L. Howze
- Marlon Green
- Edward Francis Murphy

== See also ==
- Josephites (Maryland)
- St. Joseph's Seminary (Washington, DC)
- Black Catholicism
