= David E. Harris =

American commercial airline pilot (1934–2024)

- Born: David Ellsworth Harris; December 22, 1934; Columbus, Ohio, U.S.
- Died: March 8, 2024 (aged 89); Marietta, Georgia, U.S.
- Military career
- Branch: United States Air Force
- Service years: 1958–1964
- Rank: Captain

David Ellsworth Harris (December 22, 1934 – March 8, 2024) was an American commercial airline pilot. Harris was the first African-American commercial pilot and the first to achieve the rank of captain for a major American commercial airline.

== Early life and education ==
Harris was born on December 22, 1934, in Columbus, Ohio. His father was Wilbur Rothchild Harris Sr. (June 4, 1900 – July 31, 1989) and his mother was Ruth A. Estis Harris (March 19, 1903 – September 22, 1961). He had one brother, Wilbur Rothchild "Wil" Harris Jr. (November 1, 1932 – January 7, 2020), who served as a U.S. Army Honor Guard at Arlington National Cemetery's Tomb of the Unknown Soldier. Harris's grandfather was Reverend Henry Estis (January 5, 1863 – May 20, 1948), a formerly enslaved black American from Lunenburg County, Virginia, and founder and pastor of Zion Baptist Church in Chillicothe, Ohio.

Harris grew up in an integrated neighborhood in Columbus, where he attended University School, a private high school.

In 1957, Harris graduated from Ohio State University, with a B.S. degree in education. While a university student there, he was rejected twice for Ohio State's advanced Air Force ROTC program on racial grounds. He was eventually granted admission, and once in the program, rose to the rank of cadet colonel.

== U.S. military career ==
In 1958, Harris joined the U.S. Air Force (USAF), following the receipt of a Reserve Officers Training Corps commission as a 2nd lieutenant.

Following his completion of basic flight training in Orlando, Florida, Harris graduated from advanced flight training at Big Spring, Texas, flying Boeing B-47 Stratojets there. He was then assigned to a number of bases across the U.S., including New York, Florida, Maine, and Texas, He was also assigned to an airbase in England, where the U.S. Air Force maintained vigilance against the Soviet Union. During the Cold War, Harris piloted B-47s that were armed with nuclear weapons, and the B-52 for the Strategic Air Command (SAC).

After struggling with race-based housing discrimination during his assignments, Harris left the military on December 1, 1964, to better support his wife and two children. He was discharged with the rank of captain.

== Commercial airline career ==
Before entering civilian life, Harris interviewed with several major U.S. commercial airlines for a pilot's job without success, largely denied a position on racial grounds. Although Harris was a light-complexioned African American who could pass as white, Harris closed all of his application letters with the declarative statement "I'm married, I have two children and I'm black." In 1964, Harris interviewed with American Airlines. To avoid what Harris deemed to be an inevitable denial based on his race, Harris informed the interviewer that he was African American. The chief pilot conducting the interview responded: "This is American Airlines and we don't care if you're black, white or chartreuse, we only want to know, can you fly the plane?"

On December 3, 1964, two days after leaving the USAF, Harris became the first African American hired as a commercial airline pilot for a major U.S. commercial airline, American Airlines. Following the completion of nine-week training, Harris became an American Airlines co-pilot. Three years later, in 1967 Harris became the first African-American male to achieve the rank of Pilot Captain for a major U.S. commercial airline.

Harris piloted a number of different types of commercial aircraft while flying at American Airlines, including their largest at the time of his retirement, the Boeing 747, plus the Boeing 727, Boeing 767, the Airbus A300, the Douglas DC-6, the Douglas DC-7, the Lockheed L-188 Electra aircraft, the BAC One-Eleven and the McDonnell Douglas MD-11.

Harris retired in 1994, after flying for American Airlines for a total of 30 years.

Harris was considered a pioneer African-American commercial airline pilot. A year after Harris was hired by American, Western Airlines hired African-American pilot Fred Pitcher; United Airlines hired African-American pilot Bill Norwood. Eventually, other major U.S. commercial airlines would hire their inaugural slate of African-American pilots, including Eastern Airlines' Les Morris, TWA's John Gordon, Delta Air Lines' Sam Grady, Northwest Airlines' Woodie Fountain, DHL's Irvory Carter and Pan Am's M. Perry Jones.

== Friendship with Whitney Young ==
In 1967, Harris met civil rights leader and National Urban League executive director Whitney Young on one of Harris' flights in Indianapolis, Indiana. Exiting his cockpit, Harris introduced himself to Young, and thanked him for helping African Americans get jobs in various fields, including aviation.

Young drowned in Lagos, Nigeria four years later, while attending an international conference. Young's wife, Margaret, asked American Airlines to locate the African-American pilot Young met years earlier. Margaret wanted the American Airlines pilot in question to fly her husband's remains back to the United States. When American Airlines offered an all-African-American flight and cabin crew, Margaret balked: "That's not the way of the Urban League. It should be black and white together." Honoring Margaret's wishes, Harris flew Young's body from Lagos, Nigeria, to LaGuardia Airport in New York City, New York, and from LaGuardia Airport to Louisville, Kentucky.

== Personal life and death ==
Harris' wife was Lynne Purdy Harris, and the couple had two children.

From his retirement, Harris resided in Beverly, Massachusetts and in Country Haven, an Airpark/fly-in community near Trenton, South Carolina. He flew a single-engine Socata Trinidad at Country Haven.

David E. Harris died on March 8, 2024, in Marietta, Georgia, at the age of 89.

== Memberships ==
Harris served as the president of the Organization of Black Airline Pilots (OBAP), and also retained his membership with the Negro Airmen International (NAI).

== Honors ==
- The Smithsonian National Air & Space Museum features Harris and his uniform, hat and other memorabilia in its "Black Wings in Aviation" exhibit.
- The American Airlines C.R. Smith Museum in Fort Worth, Texas features Harris in its permanent exhibit.
- During a ceremony honoring Harris as the first African-American commercial airline pilot, Harris remarked: "I'm honored and humbled by this award ... but the reality is that there were 500 pilots Tuskegee Airmen who were qualified for airline jobs when they left the service. None of them received an opportunity to sit in a cockpit. There is no way I should be the first; it should've happened long before 1964."
