= Rensselaer, Missouri =

- Village
- Location of Rensselaer, Missouri
- Coordinates: 39°40′09″N 91°32′19″W
- Country: United States
- State: Missouri
- County: Ralls

Area
  - Total: 2.01 sq mi (5.20 km^{2})
  - Land: 1.95 sq mi (5.06 km^{2})
  - Water: 0.054 sq mi (0.14 km^{2})
- Elevation: 692 ft (211 m)

Population (2020)
  - Total: 253
  - Density: 129.4/sq mi (49.96/km^{2})
- Time zone: UTC-6 (Central (CST))
  - Summer (DST): UTC-5 (CDT)
- FIPS code: 29-61184
- GNIS feature ID: 2399058

Rensselaer (/ˈrɛnsələr/ REN-səl-ər) is a village in Ralls County, Missouri, United States. The population was 253 at the 2020 census. It is part of the Hannibal Micropolitan Statistical Area.

== History ==
Rensselaer was laid out in 1876. The community took its name from nearby Rensselaer Academy. A post office called Rensselaer was established in 1871, and remained in operation until 1953.

St. Peter's Catholic Church was listed on the National Register of Historic Places in 1980.

== Geography ==
According to the United States Census Bureau, the village has a total area of 2.01 square miles (5.21 km^{2}), of which 1.96 square miles (5.08 km^{2}) is land and 0.05 square miles (0.13 km^{2}) is water.

== Demographics ==
Historical population
Census	Pop.	Note	%±
2000	145		—
2010	228		57.2%
2020	253		11.0%
U.S. Decennial Census

=== 2010 census ===
As of the census of 2010, there were 228 people, 78 households, and 61 families living in the village. The population density was 116.3 inhabitants per square mile (44.9/km^{2}). There were 87 housing units at an average density of 44.4 per square mile (17.1/km^{2}). The racial makeup of the village was 100.0% White. Hispanic or Latino of any race were 0.4% of the population.

There were 78 households, of which 42.3% had children under the age of 18 living with them, 69.2% were married couples living together, 2.6% had a female householder with no husband present, 6.4% had a male householder with no wife present, and 21.8% were non-families. 17.9% of all households were made up of individuals, and 3.8% had someone living alone who was 65 years of age or older. The average household size was 2.73 and the average family size was 3.15.

The median age in the village was 34.5 years. 28.9% of residents were under the age of 18; 5.4% were between the ages of 18 and 24; 30.3% were from 25 to 44; 26.3% were from 45 to 64; and 9.2% were 65 years of age or older. The gender makeup of the village was 49.6% male and 50.4% female.

=== 2000 census ===
As of the census of 2000, there were 145 people, 48 households, and 40 families living in the village. The population density was 73.8 inhabitants per square mile (28.5/km^{2}). There were 53 housing units at an average density of 27.0 per square mile (10.4/km^{2}). The racial makeup of the village was 100.00% White. Hispanic or Latino of any race were 3.45% of the population.

There were 48 households, out of which 43.8% had children under the age of 18 living with them, 72.9% were married couples living together, 6.3% had a female householder with no husband present, and 14.6% were non-families. 12.5% of all households were made up of individuals, and 4.2% had someone living alone who was 65 years of age or older. The average household size was 2.79 and the average family size was 3.00.

In the village, the population was spread out, with 26.2% under the age of 18, 6.9% from 18 to 24, 31.7% from 25 to 44, 26.9% from 45 to 64, and 8.3% who were 65 years of age or older. The median age was 35 years. For every 100 females, there were 107.1 males. For every 100 females age 18 and over, there were 105.8 males.

The median income for a household in the village was $55,179, and the median income for a family was $56,806. Males had a median income of $30,938 versus $19,375 for females. The per capita income for the village was $18,103. None of the families and 4.4% of the population lived below the poverty line, including those under eighteen and those over 64.
