= Edward Francis Murphy =

American playwright, novelist, educator and Catholic priest

Edward Francis Murphy, SSJ (July 21, 1892 – August 2, 1967) was an American playwright, novelist, educator, and Catholic priest known for creating the "first Catholic best-seller", the novel The Scarlet Lily. He was also a close friend of Sinclair Lewis and introduced him to the Black community, inspiring his novel Kingsblood Royal. He was a member of the Josephites.

== Biography ==
Murphy was born July 2, 1892 in Salem, Massachusetts. His family was Irish Catholic, he grew up on Derby Street, and attended St Mary's parish and school.

As a teenager, he was mentored by the philanthropist Caroline Emmerton, who had founded The House of the Seven Gables Settlement Association and sought to bring Murphy under her artistic patronage.

=== Priesthood ===
Instead, Murphy followed his brother Will's footsteps to become a Catholic priest, enrolling at Baltimore's Epiphany Apostolic College, the minor seminary of the Society of St Joseph of the Sacred Heart (aka the Josephites). The society, founded in 1893, dedicates itself to serving African Americans.

Murphy was ordained in 1918, and celebrated his first Mass at Immaculate conception Catholic Church in his hometown of Salem, before returning to the DC metro to attend Catholic University of America, where he attained a doctorate in philosophy.

After ordination, Murphy served near New York City, where he ran into a childhood friend who had by then become known as Eddie Dowling. They would maintain their friendship thereafter.

In 1932, Murphy was reassigned to New Orleans, where he served at a Josephite parish and also as dean of religion and philosophy at Xavier University of Louisiana, an HBCU founded by Katharine Drexel less than a decade before.

==== Theater ====
During his time at the school, Murphy continued to cultivate his artistic ventures via the students, helping them to stage plays and other works to raise the profile of the university. The Black Press took interest in their work, and prominent African Americans in the city also supported, helping them to gain more prominent venues for their productions.

Murphy also kept busy with personal projects, including a play based on the life of Mary Magdalene, understood to be a converted prostitute who was mentioned in the gospel narratives.

During his XULA tenure, Murphy received from Dowling the rights to the latter's hit 1938 play Shadow and Substance, free of charge, which Murphy eventually passed on to a local company in the Crescent City. They would stage an adaptation starring Sinclair Lewis as a priest himself, who became a lifelong friend to Murphy (and received inroads from him to the Black community, inspiring his novel Kingsblood Royal).

Murphy adapted his Mary Magdalene play into a 1944 novel The Scarlet Lily. Hollywood filmmaker David Selznick obtained the right to adapt the novel for the screen after it became known as "the first Catholic best-seller". Selznick planned to have Ingrid Bergman star as the Magdalene, but the project eventually fell through.

=== Death ===
Murphy died August 2, 1967.

== Works ==
- The Tenth Man (1937)
- The Scarlet Lily (1944)
- Mademoiselle Lavalliere (1948)
- Yankee Priest (1952)
