= St. Francis Xavier Church (Baltimore) =

Coordinates: 39.307128°N 76.597947°W

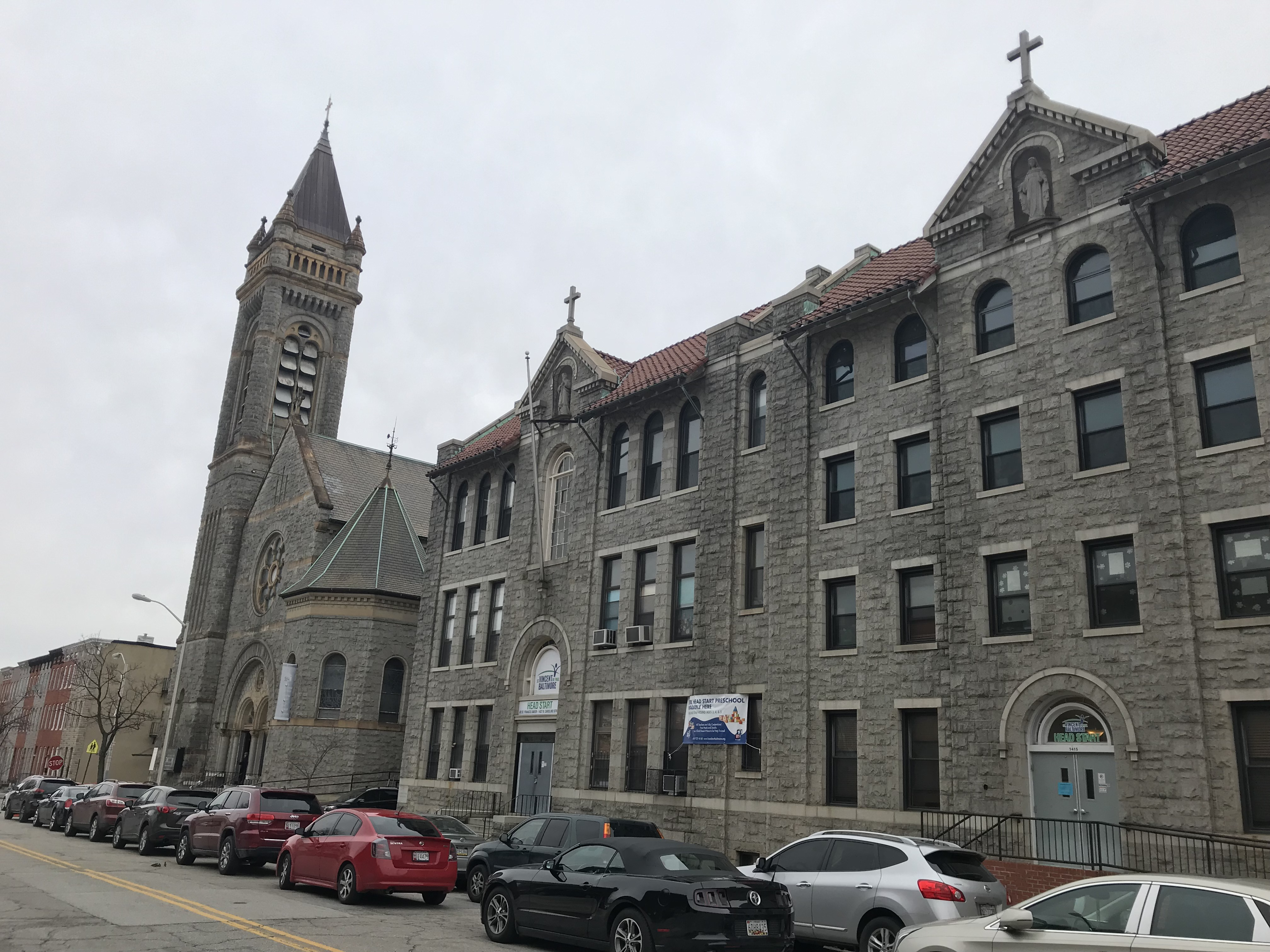

- Location: 1501 E. Oliver Street, Baltimore, Maryland
- Country: United States
- Denomination: Catholic
- Religious institute: Spiritans

History
- Founded: 1863
- Founder(s): Black San Domingo refugees and the Sulpician Fathers
- Dedication: Francis Xavier
- Dedicated: February 21, 1864

Architecture
- Functional status: Active
- Heritage designation: For African-American Catholics
- Architectural type: Church

Clergy
- Archbishop: William Lori

Historic St. Francis Xavier Church is a Black Catholic parish in Baltimore, Maryland. It is said to be the first exclusively Black parish in America, having been established in 1863 (with roots in the late 18th century).

== History ==
=== Background ===
On July 11, 1791, six ships from the French fleet arrived at Fell's Point, Baltimore, bringing a large number of Black Catholic refugees from Cape Francois in the French colony of San Domingo. There were between 500 and 1,000 Black refugees, both enslaved and free. The Sulpician Fathers had fled France in 1790 as refugees of the French Revolution and were affiliated with St. Mary's Seminary, in whose basements the Haitians began to meet. Both the Sulpicians and the Haitian refugees spoke French.

The majority of the free Black refugees were educated and wealthy, and the church became popular with the elite class of African-Americans in Baltimore thereafter.

In 1828, one of the parish priests, Fr James Joubert, teamed with Servant of God Mary Lange to found the Oblate Sisters of Providence, the first order of Catholic nuns of African descent in the United States, and started St Frances Academy, the first and oldest Black Catholic school in the United States. When the Oblates moved to a new location in 1836, the parish moved with them.

==== First move ====
In the 1850s, local Jesuits invited the congregation to begin meeting at St. Ignatius Church, where the group again met in a basement chapel, this time under the name of Blessed Peter Claver.

Present at this time were Fr Peter Louis Miller, SJ and the retired Bishop Michael O'Connor, both of whom would later work with the country's first Black (though by then former) seminarian William Augustine Williams to minister to the Black community at St Ignatius/Peter Claver.

=== Independent parish ===
In 1863, with St. Ignatius Church under Fr Anthony Ciampi, the Jesuits helped the Black congregation purchase a building, which was dedicated the next year under the current name.

In 1871, the Mill Hill Fathers arrived from England at the request of the local bishop, to minister to African-Americans. They were given charge of the parish that same year. Within the few decades, the Mill Hill operations in the US were spun off into a new religious society, the Society of St Joseph of the Sacred Heart (also known as the Josephites). They administer the parish to this day.

The parish would move to a new location in 1932, and again in 1968 to its present location at the intersection of Caroline and Oliver streets. The (now-coeducational) Oblates school and convent are still located within walking distance.

==== Inculturation ====
During the Black Catholic Movement of the late 1960s to 1990s, the parish would become the first to allow and practice shouting, a distinct form of Black Christian liturgical dance (which Black Catholics adopted from Black Protestantism).

=== Spiritans ===
Following the closure of numerous Black Catholic parishes in Baltimore in 2024, administration of St. Francis Xavier was transferred from the Josephites to the Spiritans.

== See also ==
- Josephite Fathers
- Society of Saint-Sulpice
