= John R. Slattery =

American priest, activist, missionary, writer, and lawyer

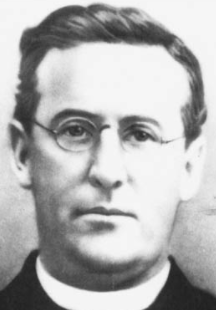

Personal details
- Born: July 16, 1851 New York City
- Died: March 6, 1926 (aged 74) New York City
- Occupation: Activist, author, and former missionary

John Richard Slattery (July 16, 1851 – March 6, 1926) was an American former Catholic priest, activist, missionary, writer and lawyer. He was first a member of the Mill Hill Missionaries, later becoming in 1893 a co-founder and the first superior general of the Society of St. Joseph of the Sacred Heart (also known as the Josephites). He later left the society and the Church, becoming an anti-Catholic polemicist.

== Biography ==
Born on July 16, 1851 to a wealthy Irish-American family in New York City, Slattery was ordained in 1877. His work in both religious communities was with African Americans in the aftermath of the Civil War and Reconstruction, a mission first inaugurated by the Mill Hill founder, Cardinal Herbert Vaughan, in 1871.

Slattery worked for years in the mission field, establishing parishes, schools, and other ministries on behalf of the society. Among these were St. Joseph's Seminary for graduate students studying to become Josephites, and Epiphany Apostolic College, a minor seminary for the order. Both schools educated several of the first African-American Catholic priests in history, including Charles Uncles. Slattery also founded the Josephite Harvest, as of 2022 the longest-running Catholic missions magazine in the United States.

Among his various pursuits, Slattery also collaborated with prominent lay Black Catholics. Among these were Daniel Rudd, the founder of the nation's first Black Catholic newspaper, the American Catholic Tribune, and the Colored Catholic Congress. Slattery was heavily involved in both pursuits, before a falling out led to his withdrawal of support.

After years of struggle against racism both in and outside the Catholic Church, including vehement opposition to his goal of ordaining African Americans to the Catholic priesthood, Slattery left the Josephites and the Church in 1906 before marrying and becoming outspokenly anti-Catholic.

A lawyer by trade from then until his death on March 6, 1926, his fortune and papers were left to the New York Public Library.

== See also ==
- Josephites (Maryland)
- Black Catholicism
- St. Joseph's Seminary (Washington, DC)
- Epiphany Apostolic College
