= Josephites (Maryland) =

Roman Catholic society of apostolic life

Society of Saint Joseph of the Sacred Heart
- Societas Sodalium Sancti Joseph a Sacra Corde
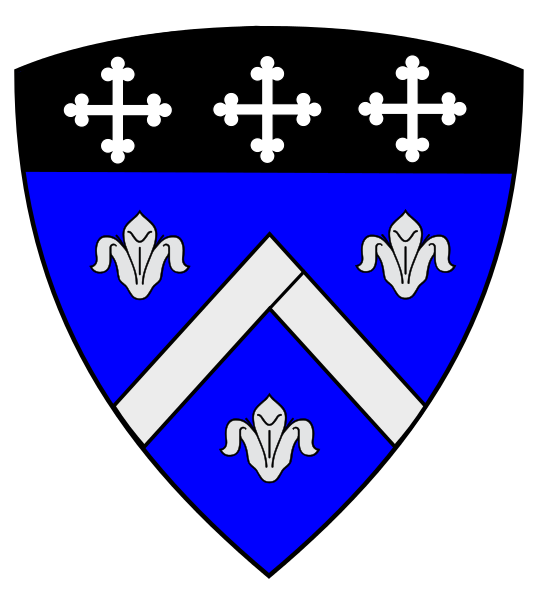
- Abbreviation: SSJ
- Nickname: Josephites
- Formation: May 30, 1893; 133 years ago
- Founders: John R. Slattery; Charles Uncles; John A. Deruyter; Dominic Manley; Lambert Welbers
- Founded at: Baltimore, United States
- Type: Society of apostolic life of pontifical right for men
- Headquarters: 1130 N. Calvert Street, Baltimore, Maryland, United States
- Members: 68 members (58 priests) as of 2020
- Superior General: John Huston Ricard, SSJ
- Ministry: Sacramental, educational and pastoral
- Parent organization: Catholic Church
- Website: josephites.org

The Society of Saint Joseph of the Sacred Heart (Latin: Societas Sodalium Sancti Joseph a Sacra Corde), also known as the Josephites, is a society of apostolic life of pontifical right for men, headquartered in Baltimore, Maryland. Members work specifically among African Americans, and take the postnominals SSJ.

The Josephites were formed in 1893 by a group of Mill Hill priests working with newly freed Black people emancipated during the American Civil War. The founders included Fr John R. Slattery, who led the group and became the first Josephite superior general; and one of the nation's first black priests, Fr Charles Uncles. With permission from the Mill Hill leaders in England and the Archbishop of Baltimore, Cardinal James Gibbons, the group established the Josephites as an independent mission society based in America and dedicated totally to the African-American cause.

The Josephites have served in Black Catholic parishes, schools, and other ministries around the country. They also played a major role in the Black Catholic Movement of the late 20th century, in which Black Catholicism became a more prominent part of the larger Black church, liturgically and otherwise. The Josephites were instrumental in the restoration of the permanent diaconate in the United States following the Second Vatican Council, and the Josephite bishop John Ricard helped found the National Black Catholic Congress in 1987.

In 2011, the society elected its first African-American superior general, Fr William "Bill" Norvel, who established a vocations hub for the society in Nigeria. The next two superiors have also been African Americans, the latest being Ricard. As of September 2021, the rest of the society's leadership and its new seminarians and priests are almost all Nigerians.

== History ==
=== Background (1865–1869) ===
1865 ushered in the period of Southern Reconstruction, during which time, the Thirteenth Amendment to the United States Constitution, outlawing slavery, was passed. Ten former Confederate states were divided into five military districts. As a condition of readmission to the Union, the former Confederate states were required to ratify the Fourteenth Amendment to the Constitution, which granted citizenship to all people born in the U.S. regardless of race.

It was against this backdrop that the U.S. Catholic bishops met for their tenth provincial council in Baltimore, Maryland in 1869. The fifth decree of this council exhorted the Council Fathers to provide missions and schools for all black Americans in their dioceses, as education was seen as a critical need by the community.

Subsequently, the Council Fathers wrote a letter requesting clergy for that purpose to Father Herbert Vaughan, superior general of the Saint Joseph's Society for Foreign Missions in Mill Hill, London. He had founded the society in 1866, and in 1869 opened St Joseph's Foreign Missionary College in that area of London. Vaughan later became Archbishop of Westminster and a cardinal.

=== American beginnings and independence (1870–1893) ===
Vaughan, with an additional commission for the work from Pope Pius IX, brought a group of his priests to Baltimore in 1871 to serve the freedmen. Bishops around the U.S. had varying constituencies of Black Catholics during this period, and often too few priests, parishes, and programs to serve them. While this didn't necessarily concern individual bishops, the larger bishops' group for the country did take up the cause, establishing a system of missionary work to the black apostolate that was most often filled by groups like the Mill Hill Fathers. As the need arose in a given diocese for black-focused ministry, they would be called in to pastor parishes, staff schools, and establish missionary posts to gain converts.

In 1893, Fr John R. Slattery (a leader within the North American branch of the Mill Hill Fathers) petitioned that the Mill Hill priests in the U.S. reorganize to create a U.S.-based institution. The commitment to the African-American apostolate by the new society was to be the same as before: to teach the faith of the Catholic Church and to promote the Church's teachings on social justice. The plan was approved, and a small number of the US Mill Hill priests agreed to transfer and were received by Baltimore archbishop James Gibbons to form what would begin as a diocesan institute.

=== Initial struggles and Fr Uncles (1893–1933) ===
Among the small founding group of Josephite priests in 1893 was Fr Charles R. Uncles, the first African-American priest ordained on US soil, and the first trained in the United States, though his initial studies were at a seminary in Quebec.

Fr Uncles faced unremitting opposition both within and outside the order, as ordaining a black priest and placing one were two entirely different matters. Racist laypeople, priests, and bishops alike soured the new venture, ensuring that black priests were not welcome in local parishes and communities—stifling Slattery's dreams of a booming black priestly class. Instead, black priests like Uncles were relegated to preaching tours in the Deep South, subservient parochial roles, and teaching posts at the Josephite seminary in DC. Meanwhile, the white Josephite priests pressed on, expanding their work across the country.

John Henry Dorsey, SSJ, was ordained in the society on June 21, 1902, becoming just the second black priest ordained in America (after Uncles). He helped found the Knights of Peter Claver in 1909 at Most Pure Heart of Mary Catholic Church in Mobile, Alabama. However, in 1923, he was murdered by a student's father.

Epiphany Apostolic College was opened in 1925 near Newburgh, New York and servedd as the society's minor seminary, educating students through high school and for two years of college studies. That same year, the Josephites helped found Xavier University of Louisiana, then the nation's only Black Catholic university. Fr Edward Brunner, SSJ served as the institution's first and only priest president. The Josephites were elevated to the status of a society of apostolic life of pontifical right in 1932.

On his part (and mostly due to the unrelenting racism he saw in the US Catholic Church), Slattery eventually lost hope in the mission, in Catholicism, and in Christianity overall—leaving his post, the priesthood and eventually the faith. He then married and became a successful lawyer, leaving his fortune and papers to the New York Public Library upon his death the same year as Dorsey.

Fr Uncles died an outcast within the order in 1933, frustrated by racist circumstances to the point that he no longer considered himself a Josephite at all.

=== Growth and continued racism (1933–1950) ===
After the initial experiences with Uncles and a scant few others, subsequent Josephite superiors general were hesitant to accept black candidates to the order at all; they accepted a mulatto here and there, but largely stayed away from the question of black priests even as they continued to work with blacks.

This reticence (and vocational dearth) was noticed by Black Catholics themselves, most notably Thomas Wyatt Turner and his Federated Colored Catholics organization. This pressure did not have much effect for many years, but the issue remained on the table as the Josephites continued to grow in both membership and parochial administration.

Louis Pastorelli, the Josephite's longest-serving superior general, throughout the Interwar Period continued the society's policy of restricting black candidates, but cautiously supported other orders' black priesthood efforts—specifically the Divine Word order's plans for a black seminary in Mississippi, which quickly produced four new, well-received black priests.

As more dioceses and orders began to accept black candidates into their priestly formation programs, the Josephites slowly became more open to receiving black candidates without restriction. During the 1940s, Josephite superior general Edward V Casserly instituted official policies allowing more freely for black applicants. During the same period, the order also added 20 parishes and 20 schools—including the all-black (and all-male) St Augustine High in New Orleans, formerly a diocesan school.

=== Civil rights and Black Power (1950–1971) ===
As the door flew open to black priests in the lead-up to the Civil Rights Movement, the Josephite order faced the possibility of changing color, causing consternation among not a few members. One higher-up from the old guard went so far as to institute an explicitly racist policy to prevent black applications from being assessed at all; Casserly quickly called a meeting of the leadership and quashed the overreach. Even so, Casserly's heavy-handed management style made for an abrupt end in 1948 to his tenure as superior general. His successor, Thomas P. McNamara (and McNamara's right-hand man, future superior general George F. O'Dea), continued the expansion of Josephite activity and black vocations.

After a few decades of positive signs and progress (including the notable saga of oft-arrested Josephite activist Philip Berrigan), the bloody end to the Civil Rights Movement proper presented a new challenge: black radicalism. The assassination of Martin Luther King Jr brought issues of racism to a head and fostered a newfound commitment to social justice and Black Power among many black clergy and religious. This began in earnest with the convening of the inaugural National Black Catholic Clergy Caucus (NBCCC), held in Detroit in April 1968, shortly after King's assassination and the resultant riots. It was the first-ever meeting of the nation's Black Catholic clergy and produced a statement that in its opening line called the Catholic Church in America "primarily a White, racist institution."

This helped produce calls for more authentic black freedom and expression, as well as black oversight of black parishes and schools, causing tension across the Church—including at St Joseph's Seminary (the Josephite house) in Washington, D.C. Epiphany, the minor seminary in New York, rapidly lost numbers around the same time, and was merged with another society's minor seminary program in 1970; it soon closed altogether. Black laypeople protested at St Joseph's in summer 1971, and eventually a good number of seminarians left or were asked to leave, causing the school to close for studies that same year. (Josephite seminarians, retired Josephites and other priests, and outside renters continue to use the building for lodging, and it also houses the Josephite archives, Pastoral Center, library, and other publicly accessible spaces.)

Some of the demands made by laypeople during the period of rupture were in fact met, including the reestablishment of the permanent diaconate, an act which came largely at the behest of a Josephite priest and with a focus on the African-American community.

After the Black Power crisis, Josephite seminarians began to study at the now-closed Washington Theological Union. The society later utilized Xavier University of Louisiana—which the Josephites helped to found—as a sort of minor seminary. The society eventually began sending its students successively to the Washington Theological Union, the Dominican House of Studies, Howard University, Catholic University of America, and/or other DC institutions.

=== Modern era ===
During the 1980s, Fr William Norvel served as consultor general for the Josephites and as president of the NBCCC. He is credited with starting the Catholic gospel choir movement in Washington, D.C., and Los Angeles, implementing in a liturgical way some of the calls for black expression that came out of the Detroit meeting. In 1987, the Josephites' Bishop John Ricard founded the National Black Catholic Congress, a revival of the Colored Catholic Congress movement of the late 19th century.

In June 2011, some 130 years after their founding, the Josephites elected Norvel as their first black superior general. Both of the following superiors general have also been black, including the sitting, Bishop Ricard.

==== Nigeria ====
Norvel also established a Josephite house of spiritual formation in Nigeria, where he served for five years and which now produces most of the Josephite's vocations; the society's new seminarians and priests have been almost entirely Nigerian for some time. The society currently operates a minor seminary there, and in 2021 received roughly a dozen new students for the school. Their Nigerian students earn their undergraduate degrees at Dominican University Ibadan before matriculating to the Catholic University of America in the United States for their Master of Divinity.

==== Relocation of headquarters ====
St Joseph's Manor, which had been the residence of the superior general and other administrators, was sold in January 2019. They now reside nearby in a shared residential and office space, which has functioned as the Josephites headquarters since around 2016.

== Organization and membership ==
The society operates 34 parishes across 12 (arch)dioceses, as well as St. Augustine High School in New Orleans, Louisiana, a historically black high school, established by the society with the Archdiocese of New Orleans in 1951.

The headquarters is located in northern Baltimore and their seminarian and retiree residence, St. Joseph Seminary, is in Washington, D.C.

In 2012, the society had 40 houses and 88 members, including 76 priests.

In late 2020, Vicar General Fr Thomas Frank reported that the order had 60 members.

== The Josephite Harvest (magazine) ==
The Josephite Harvest is the official magazine of the society, and is the oldest extant Catholic missions magazine in the US. It first began in 1888, published under the name The Colored Harvest, before changing its name in 1960. During the 20th century, The Harvest chronicled the Josephites' efforts to build parishes and schools for African-Americans throughout the nation.

Today, the magazine publishes quarterly in a physical format, with a digital version also available.

== St Joseph's Seminary ==
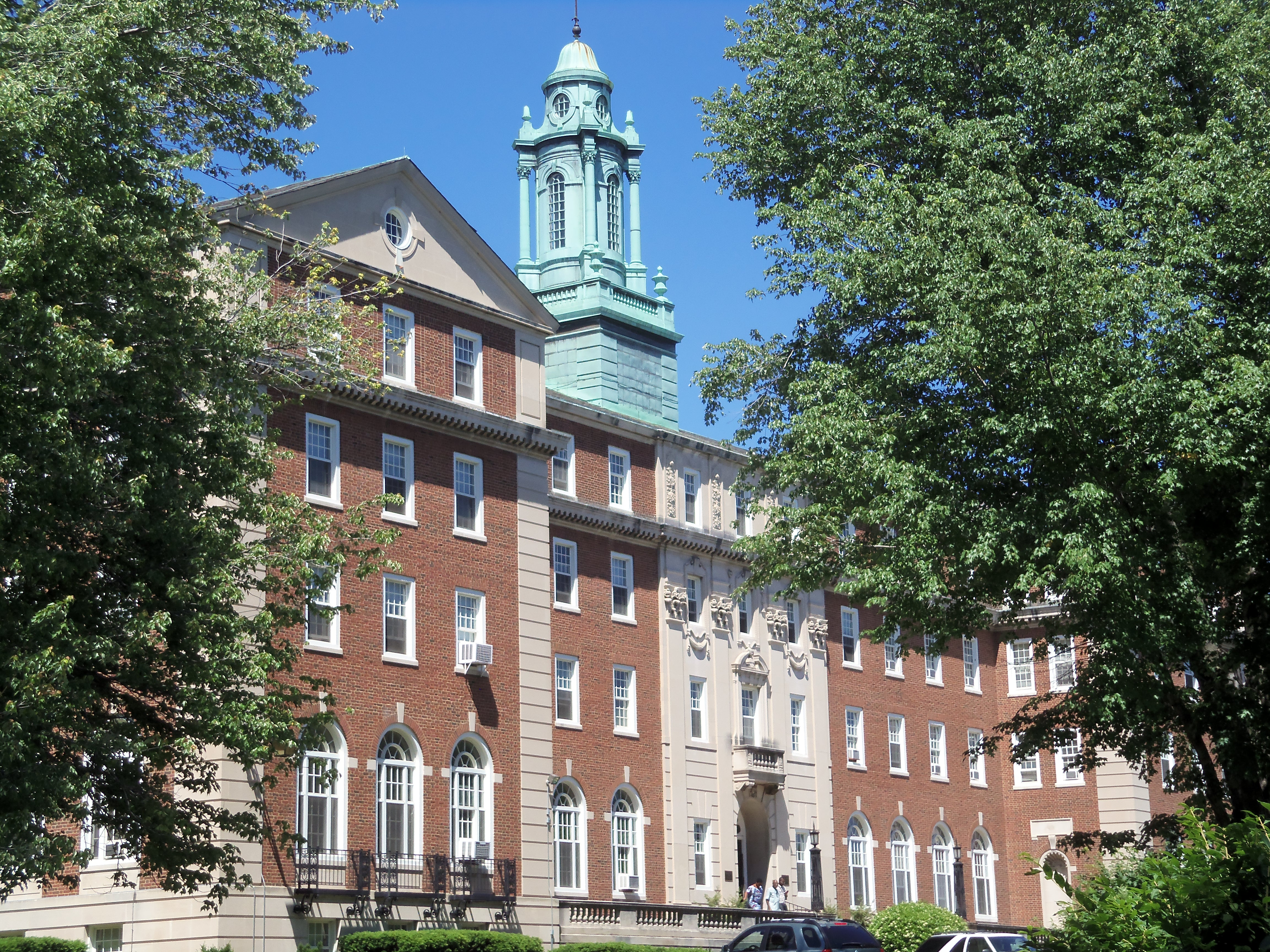
St. Joseph Seminary in Washington, D.C.

St Joseph's, the Josephite seminary, is located in Brookland, Washington, D.C. It is one of the many vaunted Catholic institutions in the area, known today for its significant Church influence and presence.

While the seminary closed for academic studies in 1971, it continues to house the Josephite seminarians during the school year, as well as retired Josephites (and other) priests and unaffiliated residents year-round.

The seminary was added to the National Register of Historic Places in 2022.

=== Archives ===
Also found in this building are the Josephite archives, widely regarded as some of the most extensive records of African-American history in the entire country. They were most recently managed by Josephite priest, but after his passing were passed on to a lay archivist (who heavily updated their organization and availability for researchers).

=== Pastoral Center ===
The Josephite Pastoral Center (JPC), also located in the seminary, remains one of the few providers of materials meant specifically for African-American Catholic ministry. The shop is open to the public and sells items ranging from calendars (including the annual Josephite African American history calendar) to artwork to books to music. The JPC was also once the main outpost for the distribution of the "Jesus Mafa" art series, which was originally licensed to the Josephites by its creator. The JPC also manages an online store for its merchandise.

=== Library ===
The St Joseph Seminary Library is also significant, housing a number of important artifacts and documents related to both African American and African-American Catholic history. Some of these exhibits are open to the public, while others are undeveloped and largely untouched.

== Notable members ==
- Charles Uncles, first African-American Catholic priest ordained on US soil
- Edward Murphy, famous playwright
- Philip Berrigan, anti-war activist
- Eugene Marino, first African-American Catholic archbishop
- Carl Fisher, first and only African-American Catholic bishop west of Texas
- William Norvel, elected superior general in 2011; first Black man to head a Catholic religious community in the United States
- John Ricard, retired bishop and superior general elected in 2019

== Superiors general ==
No.	Name	Took office	Left office	Birthplace
1	John R. Slattery	1893	1904	New York City
2	Thomas B. Donovan	1904	1908	Kentucky
3	Justin McCarthy	1908	1918	Ireland
4	Louis B. Pastorelli	1918	July 1942	Boston, Massachusetts
5	Edward V. Casserly	1942	1948	Ireland
6	Thomas P. McNamara	1948	1960	Philadelphia, Pennsylvania
7	George F. O'Dea	July 1960	October 1970	Brooklyn, New York City
8	Matthew J. O'Rourke	July 1971		Bronx, New York City
9	Eugene Patrick McManus	1988	1995	
10	Robert Michael Kearns	1995	June 17, 2003	Boston, Massachusetts
11	Edward J. Chiffriller	June 17, 2003	June 15, 2011	
12	William L. Norvel	June 15, 2011	June 19, 2015	Pascagoula, Mississippi
13	Michael Thompson	June 19, 2015	August 1, 2019	Port Arthur, Texas
14	Bishop John Ricard	August 1, 2019	present	Baton Rouge, Louisiana

== Prelates from their ranks ==
Living

- John Huston Ricard, Bishop emeritus of Pensacola–Tallahassee (US)

Deceased (by year of death)

- 1993: Carl Anthony Fisher, Auxiliary Bishop of Los Angeles (US)
- 2000: Eugene Antonio Marino, Archbishop of Atlanta (US)

== See also ==
- Black Catholicism
- Black Catholic Movement
- Oblate Sisters of Providence
- Sisters of the Holy Family (Louisiana)
- Society of the Divine Word
- Institute of Mission Helpers of the Sacred Heart
