= Education during the slave period in the United States =

During the era of chattel slavery in the United States, the proper education of enslaved African Americans (with exception made for religious instruction) was highly discouraged, and eventually made illegal in most of the Southern states.

After 1831, the prohibition against educating enslaved persons was extended in some states to free blacks as well. Regardless of the legality of educating people of color, people in this demographic ultimately received limited access to education in both the north and south.

== History ==
Slave owners saw literacy as a threat to the institution of slavery and their financial investment in it; as a North Carolina statute stated: "Teaching slaves to read and write, tends to excite dissatisfaction in their minds, and to produce insurrection and rebellion."

Literacy (the ability to read) enabled the enslaved to read the writings of people that were advocating for an end to slavery, (abolitionists). They openly spoke and wrote about the abolition of slavery and described the slave revolution in Haiti of 1791–1804 and the end of slavery in the British Empire in 1833.

Learning to read also allowed slaves to learn that thousands of enslaved individuals had escaped, often with the assistance of the Underground Railroad, to safe refuges in the Northern states and Canada. Literacy also was believed to make the enslaved unhappy at best, insolent and sullen at worst. As stated by prominent Washington lawyer Elias B. Caldwell: Enslavers often feared that educating enslaved African Americans would encourage them to question slavery, seek independence, and fight for their freedom. By restricting access to reading and writing, slaveholders attempted to maintain control over enslaved people and prevent them from gaining knowledge that could challenge the system of slavery.

The more you improve the condition of these people, the more you cultivate their minds, the more miserable you make them, in their present state. You give them a higher relish for those privileges which they can never attain, and turn what we intend for a blessing [slavery] into a curse. No, if they must remain in their present situation, keep them in the lowest state of degradation and ignorance. The nearer you bring them to the condition of brutes, the better chance do you give them of possessing their apathy.

Nonetheless, both free and enslaved African Americans continued to learn to read as a result of the sometimes clandestine efforts of free African Americans, sympathetic whites, and informal schools that operated furtively during this period. In addition, slaves used storytelling, music, and crafts to pass along cultural traditions and other information.

In the Northern states, African Americans sometimes had access to formal schooling, and were more likely to have basic reading and writing skills. The Quakers were important in establishing education programs in the North in the years before and after the Revolutionary War.

During the U.S. colonial period, several prominent religious groups both saw the conversion of slaves as a spiritual obligation, and the ability to read scriptures was seen as part of this process for Protestants. The Great Awakening served as a catalyst for encouraging education for all members of society.

Catholics saw the spiritual aspect differently, but black nuns decisively took up the charge of educating slaves and free persons in various regions, especially Louisiana (Henriette DeLille and her Sisters of the Holy Family), Georgia (Mother Mathilda Beasley), and the Washington DC area (Mary Lange and her Oblate Sisters of Providence, including Anne Marie Becraft).

While reading was encouraged in religious instruction, writing often was not. Writing was seen as a mark of status, unnecessary for many members of society, including slaves. This is due to the fact that many had to learn how to read to be able to write. Runaway Wallace Turnage "learnt" how to read and write "during that time [of his enslavement] and since [he] escaped the clutches of those who held [him] in slavery." It is believed that he learned with the help of the slaves who helped him escape to different sites: for example, someone may have taught him how to read directions to get to the next town. Memorization, catechisms, and Scripture formed the basis of what education was available.

Despite the lack of importance generally given to writing instruction, there were some notable exceptions; perhaps the most famous of these was Phillis Wheatley, whose poetry won admiration on both sides of the Atlantic.

The end of slavery and, with it, the legal prohibition of slave education did not mean that education for former slaves or their descendants became widely available. Racial segregation in schools, de jure and then de facto, and inadequate funding of schools for African Americans, if they existed at all, continued into the twenty-first century (2022).

Some current advocates for Public School Reform, cite the comparison between the goals of prohibiting education to maintain slavery, compared to the modern phenomenon of fighting school reform and upholding the current system, of underfunding and miseducation in an effort to uphold the school to prison pipeline.

== Legislation and prohibitions ==
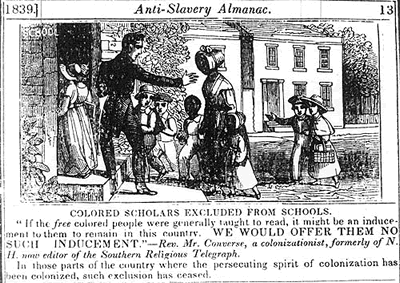
Illustration of black students excluded from school, 1839

South Carolina was established in 1670 by English colonists. The colony's economy was heavily reliant on the cultivation of rice, indigo, and other cash crops, which depended on the labor of enslaved Africans. Educating enslaved people was seen as disruptive to this economic model because it threatened to undermine the strict control that slaveholders exerted over their labor force.

Literate enslaved individuals could potentially gain access to abolitionist ideas, communicate more effectively with one another, or even forge passes, all of which posed significant risks to the stability and profitability of the plantation system. For planters in South Carolina, maintaining ignorance among the enslaved people was crucial to preserving their personal economic interests and ensuring that their workforce remained compliant and manageable. The primary methods leveraged to maintain ignorance among enslaved people were lack of education and indoctrination of religion with a highly edited version of the Bible, known as the Slave Bible.

In 1739 a group of enslaved people, collaborated to form an uprising later called the Stono Rebellion. The Stono Rebellion was led by an enslaved African named Jemmy, also known as Cato in some historical accounts. Jemmy and his fellow rebels were part of a group of about 20 enslaved Africans who began the uprising. South Carolina passed a series of laws the following year including prohibiting the education of enslaved people.

This legislation was a response to growing fears among plantation owners concerning the spread of abolitionist materials, forged passes, and other writings that might encourage enslaved people to think about the idea of freedom. The South Carolina State General Assembly drafted legislation that reads as follows: "Be it therefore Enacted by the Authority aforesaid, That all and every Person and Persons whatsoever, who shall hereafter teach or cause any Slave to be taught to write, or shall use to employ any slave as a Scribe in any Manner of Writing whatsoever, hereafter taught to write, every such offense forfeit the Sum of One Hundred Pounds current Money."

In 1759, Georgia modeled its own ban on teaching slaves to write after South Carolina's earlier legislation. Again, reading was not prohibited. Throughout the colonial era, reading instruction was tied to the spread of Christianity, so it did not suffer from restrictive legislation until much later. "Georgia, in 1829, made it unlawful for whites, slaves and free blacks to teach a slave or free black 'to read or write, either written or printed characters.'"

The most oppressive limits on slave education were a reaction to Nat Turner's Revolt in Southampton County, Virginia, during the summer of 1831. This event not only caused shock waves across the slave-holding South, but it had a particularly far-reaching impact on education over the next three decades. The fears of slave insurrections and the spread of abolitionist material and ideology led to radical restrictions on gatherings, travel, and—of course—literacy. The ignorance of the slaves was considered necessary to the security of the slaveholders. Not only did owners fear the spread of specifically abolitionist materials, they did not want slaves to question their authority; thus, reading and reflection were to be prevented at any cost.

Virginians "immediately, as an act of retaliation or vengeance, abolished every colored school within their borders; and having dispersed the pupils, ordered the teachers to leave the State forthwith, and never more to return."

While Mississippi already had laws designed to prevent slave literacy, in 1841 the state legislature passed a law that required all free African Americans to leave the state so that they would not be able to educate or incite the slave population. Other states, such as South Carolina, followed suit. The same legislation required that any black preacher would have to be given permission to speak before appearing in front of a congregation. Delaware passed in 1831 a law that prevented the meeting of a dozen or more blacks late at night; additionally, black preachers were to petition a judge or justice of the peace before speaking before any assembly. "South Carolina law enhanced the penalties for teaching slaves to read - writing had long been banned - in 1834."

In 1833, Alabama enacted a law that fined anyone who undertook a slave's education between $250 and $550; the law also prohibited any assembly of African Americans—slave or free—unless five slave owners were present or an African-American preacher had previously been licensed by an approved denomination.

Even North Carolina, which had previously allowed free African-American children to attend schools alongside whites, eventually responded to fears of insurrection. In 1830, North Carolina passed a criminal law that said that "[i]f any slave shall teach or attempt to teach, any other slave to read or write," that slave shall be punished by up to thirty-nine lashes. By 1836, the public education of all African Americans was strictly prohibited.

The dramatic increase in repression after 1830 had its desired effect, thereafter. “On plantations of hundreds of slaves it was common to discover that not one of them had the mere rudiments of education. In some large districts it was considered almost a phenomenon to find a Negro who could read the Bible or sign his name.” In Georgia, a study concluded that “outside of Savannah, Augusta and Columbus there were, it is said, not a dozen colored people able to read and write, and in the country places, perhaps not one.”

A Virginia politician in 1832 said publicly: "'We have as far as possible closed every avenue by which light may enter their [the slaves'] minds. If we could extinguish the capacity to see the light, our work would be completed; they would then be on a level with the beasts of the field and we should be safe!'"

The situation was not much better in the North. African Americans were frequently barred from public schools. Schools like the African Free School were few and far between.

== Education and subversion in the Antebellum (Pre-Civil War) Era ==
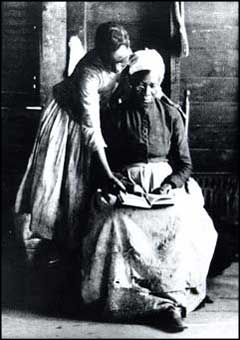
Enslaved people taught each other how to read and write.

As early as the 1710s slaves were receiving Biblical literacy from their masters. Enslaved writer Phillis Wheatley was taught in the home of her master. She ended up using her skills to write poetry and address leaders of government on her feelings about slavery (although she died in abject poverty and obscurity). Not everyone was lucky enough to have the opportunities Wheatley had. Many slaves did learn to read through Christian instruction, but only those whose owners allowed them to attend. Some slave owners would only encourage literacy for slaves because they needed someone to run errands for them and other small reasons. They did not encourage slaves to learn to write. Slave owners saw writing as something that only educated white men should know. African-American preachers would often attempt to teach some of the slaves to read in secret, but there were very few opportunities for concentrated periods of instruction. Through spirituals, stories, and other forms of oral literacy, preachers, abolitionists, and other community leaders imparted valuable political, cultural, and religious information.

Evidence suggests that enslaved people practiced reading and writing in secret. Slates with carved writings were discovered near George Washington's estate at Mount Vernon, indicating that enslaved individuals engaged in literacy activities despite the prohibitions against it.

Bly noted that "237 unidentified slates, 27 pencil leads, 2 pencil slates, and 18 writing slates were uncovered in houses once occupied by Jefferson's black bond servants." This shows that slaves were secretly practicing their reading and writing skills when they had time alone, most likely at night. They also believe slaves practiced their letters in the dirt because it was much easier to hide than writing on slates. Slaves then passed on their newly learned skills to others.

Even though mistresses were more likely than masters to ignore the law and teach slaves to read, children were by far the most likely to flout what they saw as unfair and unnecessary restrictions. While peer tutelage was limited in scope, it was common for slave children to carry the white children's books to school. Once there, they would sit outside and try to follow the lessons through the open windows.

The regular practice of hiring out slaves also helped spread literacy. As seen in Frederick Douglass's own narrative, it was common for the literate to share their learning. As a result of the constant flux, few if any plantations would fail to have at least a few literate slaves.

Douglass states in his biography that he understood the "pathway from slavery to freedom" and it was to have the power to read and write. In contrast, Schiller wrote: "After all, most educated slaves did not find that the acquisition of literacy led inexorably and inevitably to physical freedom and the idea that they needed an education to achieve and experience existential freedoms is surely problematic."

== Free black schools ==
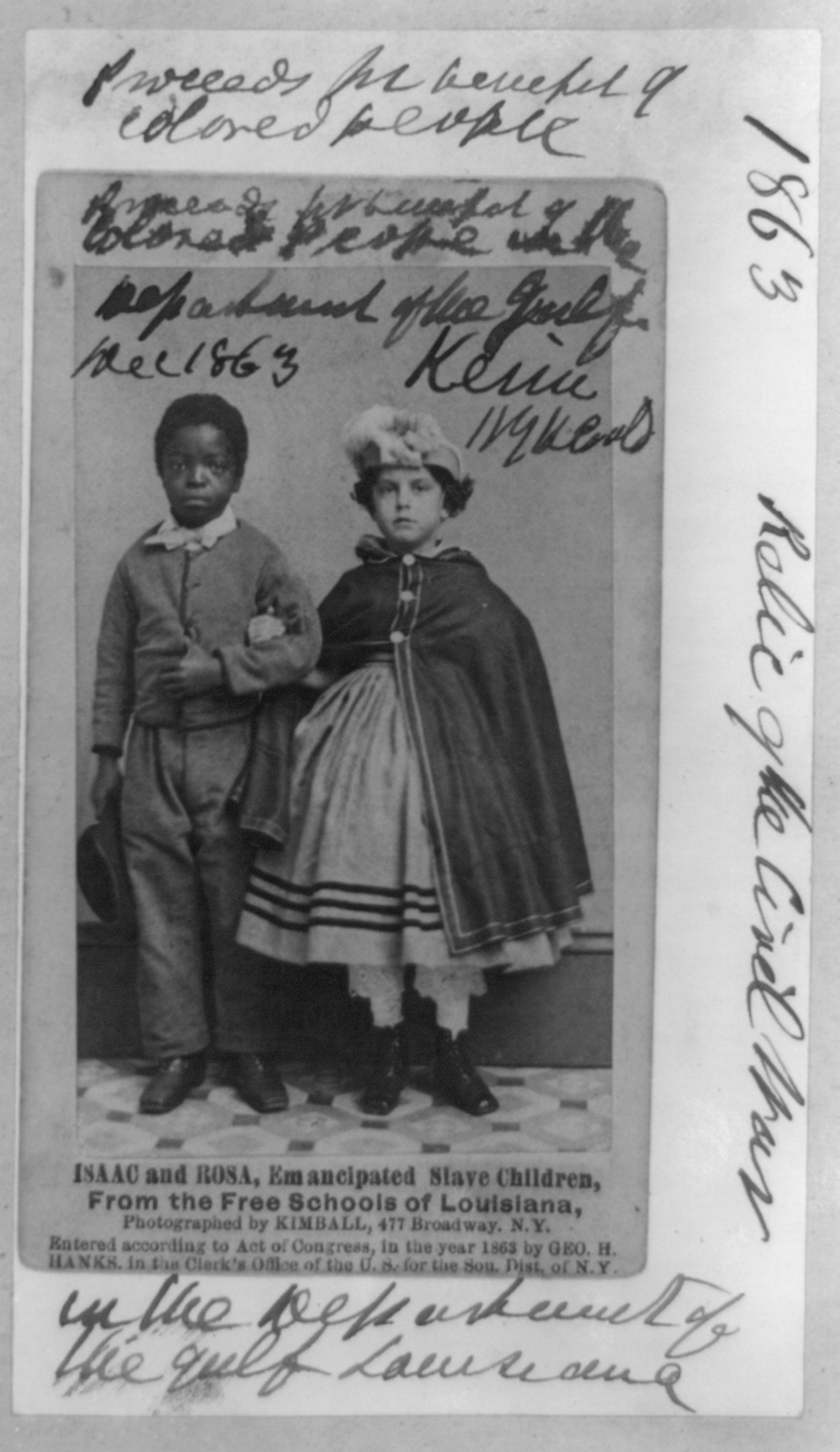
Isaac and Rosa, formerly enslaved students at the Louisiana Free School

In the 1780s a group called the Pennsylvania Society for Promoting the Abolition of Slavery (PAS) took on anti-slavery tasks. They helped former slaves with educational and economic aid. They also helped with legal obligations, like making sure they did not get sold back into slavery. Another anti-slavery group, called the New York Manumission Society (NYMS), did many things towards the abolition of slavery; one important thing they did was establish a school for free blacks, who were usually barred from white children's schools throughout the U.S. “The NYMS established the African Free School in 1787 that, during its first two decades of existence, enrolled between 100 and 200 students annually, registering a total of eight hundred pupils by 1822.” The PAS also instituted a few schools for free blacks and ran them with freed slaves.

They were taught reading, writing, grammar, math, and geography. The schools would have an annual examination day to show the public, parents, and donors the knowledge the students had gained. It mainly was to show the white population that African Americans could function in society. There are some surviving records of what they learned in the free schools. Some of the work showed that they were preparing the students for a middle-class standing in society. Founded in 1787, the African Free School provided education for blacks in New York City for more than six decades.

In 1863, an image of two emancipated slave children, Isaac and Rosa, who were studying at the Free School of Louisiana, was widely circulated in abolitionist campaigns.

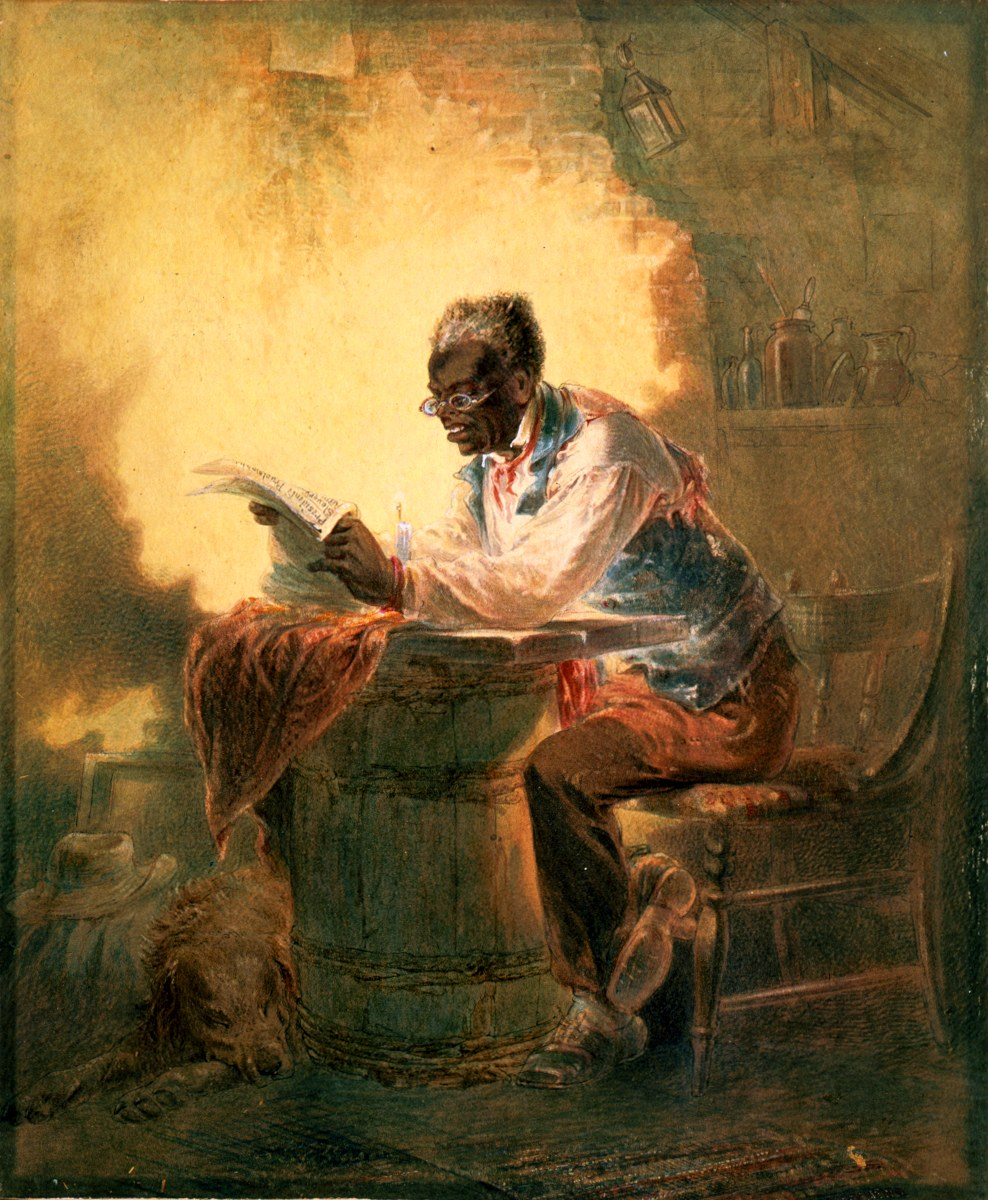
Reading the Emancipation Proclamation

In examining the educational practices of the period, it is difficult to ascertain absolute figures or numbers. W. E. B. Du Bois and other contemporaries estimated that by 1865 as many as 9% of slaves attained at least a marginal degree of literacy. Genovese comments: "this is entirely plausible and may even be too low". Especially in cities and sizable towns, many free blacks and literate slaves had greater opportunities to teach others, and both white and black activists operated illegal schools in cities such as Baton Rouge, New Orleans, Charleston, Richmond, and Atlanta.

== Notable educators ==
- John Berry Meachum, a black pastor, who created a Floating Freedom School in 1847 on the Mississippi River to circumvent anti-literacy laws. James Milton Turner attended his school.
- Margaret Crittendon Douglass, a white woman who published a memoir after she was imprisoned in Virginia in 1853 for teaching free black children to read.
- Catherine and Jane Deveaux, a black mother and daughter who, with the Catholic nun Mathilda Beasley, ran underground schools in Savannah, Georgia in the early- to mid-1800s.
- Mother Mary Lange, who with her Oblate Sisters of Providence founded St. Frances Academy in 1828.
- Mother Henriette DeLille, who with her Sisters of the Holy Family founded schools in New Orleans in the mid- to late-1800s, including St. Mary's Academy.
