= Anti-literacy laws in the United States =

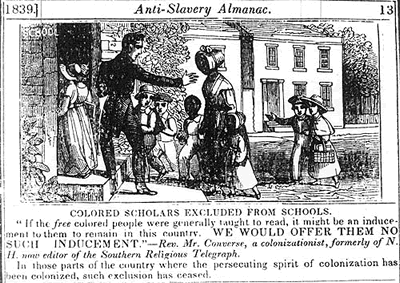
1839 illustration in the Anti-Slavery Almanac of Black students excluded from school, with quote from Reverend Mr. Converse: "If the free colored people were taught to read, it would be an inducement for them to stay in the country. We would offer them no such inducement."

Anti-literacy laws affected enslaved persons, freedmen, and, in some cases, all people of color in many slave states before and during the American Civil War. Some laws arose from concerns that literate enslaved persons could forge the documents required to escape to a free state. According to William M. Banks, "Many slaves who learned to write did indeed achieve freedom by this method. The wanted posters for runaways often mentioned whether the escapee could write." Anti-literacy laws also arose from fears of insurrection by enslaved persons, particularly around the time of abolitionist David Walker's 1829 publication of Appeal to the Colored Citizens of the World, which openly advocated rebellion, and Nat Turner's Rebellion of 1831.

The first anti-literacy law was passed by the legislature of the colony of South Carolina in 1740. Enacted in response to the 1739 Stono Rebellion, it prohibited enslaved people from learning to write and restricted their ability to read to prevent an organized slave rebellion. Southern slave states enacted anti-literacy laws between 1740 and 1834. The United States is the only country known to have had anti-literacy laws.

== State anti-literacy laws ==
Between 1740 and 1834, Alabama, Georgia, Louisiana, Mississippi, North and South Carolina, and Virginia all passed anti-literacy laws. South Carolina passed the first law which prohibited teaching enslaved persons to read and write, punishable by a fine of £100 and six months in prison, via an amendment to its 1740 Negro Act.

Some enslavers blamed abolitionists for the supposed need for anti-literacy laws. For example, South Carolina's James H. Hammond, an ardent pro-slavery ideologue, wrote in a letter written in 1845 to the British abolitionist Thomas Clarkson: "I can tell you. It was the abolition agitation. If the slave is not allowed to read his bible, the sin rests upon the abolitionists; for they stand prepared to furnish him with a key to it, which would make it, not a book of hope, and love, and peace, but of despair, hatred and blood; which would convert the reader, not into a Christian, but a demon. [...] Allow our slaves to read your writings, stimulating them to cut our throats! Can you believe us to be such unspeakable fools?"

Significant anti-black laws include:

- 1829, Georgia: Prohibited teaching black people to read, punished by fine and imprisonment
- 1830, Louisiana: passed laws punishing anyone teaching black people to read with fines, imprisonment or floggings
- 1830, North Carolina: passed laws punishing anyone teaching enslaved persons reading or writing with fines or flogging
- 1832, Alabama and Virginia: Prohibited white people from teaching black people to read or write, punished by fines and floggings
- 1833, Georgia: Prohibited black people from working in reading or writing jobs (via an employment law), and prohibited teaching black people, punished by fines and whippings (via an anti-literacy law)
- 1847, Missouri: Prohibited assembling or teaching enslaved persons to read or write

Mississippi state law required a white person to serve up to a year in prison as "penalty for teaching a slave to read".

A 19th-century Virginia law specified: "[E]very assemblage of negroes for the purpose of instruction in reading or writing, or in the night time for any purpose, shall be an unlawful assembly. Any justice may issue his warrant to any office or other person, requiring him to enter any place where such assemblage may be, and seize any negro therein; and he, or any other justice, may order such negro to be punished with stripes."

In North Carolina, black people who disobeyed the law were sentenced to whipping, while white people received a fine, jail time, or both.

AME Bishop William Henry Heard remembered from his enslaved childhood in Georgia that any enslaved person caught writing "suffered the penalty of having his forefinger cut from his right hand". Other formerly enslaved people had similar memories of disfigurement and severe punishments for reading and writing.

Arkansas, Kentucky, Maryland and Tennessee were the only slave states that did not enact a legal prohibition on educating enslaved persons.

It is estimated that only 5% to 10% of enslaved African Americans became literate, to some degree, before the American Civil War.

Restrictions on the education of black students were not limited to the South. While teaching black people in the North was not illegal, many Northern states, counties, and cities barred black students from public schools. Until 1869, only white people could attend public schools in Indiana and Illinois. Ohio excluded black children from public schools until 1849, when it allowed separate schools for black students. Public schools were also almost entirely segregated in Michigan, Minnesota, New Jersey, Pennsylvania, and New York. Only Massachusetts had de-segregated public schools before the Civil War (it barred segregation in public schools in 1855). An attempt in 1831 to open a college for black students in New Haven, Connecticut was met with such overwhelming local resistance that the project was almost immediately abandoned (see Simeon Jocelyn). Private schools that attempted to educate black and white students together, often opened by abolitionists, were destroyed by mobs, as in the case of Noyes Academy in Canaan, New Hampshire and the Quaker Prudence Crandall's Female Boarding School in Canterbury, Connecticut. After the Civil War, most Northern states legally prohibited segregation in public schools, although it often continued in practice, including through racially gerrymandered boundaries of school districts, until the Supreme Court in Brown v. Board of Education found this unconstitutional.

Once, finding us all three busily writing, Violet stood for some moments silently watching the mysterious motion of our pens, and then, in a tone of deepest sadness, said: "O! dat be great comfort, Missis. You can write to your friends all 'bout ebery ting, and so hab dem write to you. Our people can't do so. Wheder dey be 'live or dead, we can't neber know—only sometimes we hears dey be dead."

— A Key to Uncle Tom's Cabin, p. 375

== Resistance ==
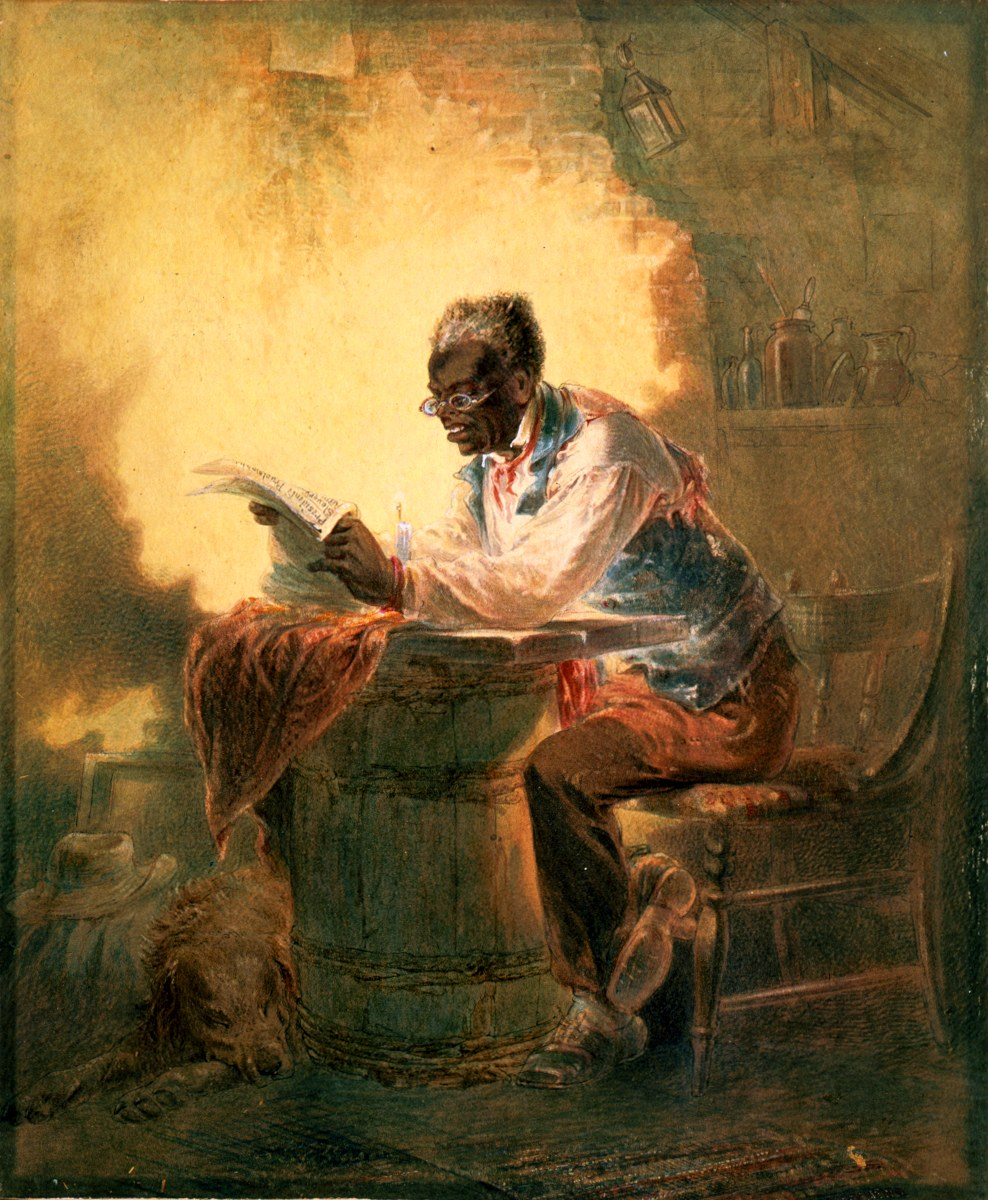
1863 painting of a man reading the Emancipation Proclamation.

Educators and enslaved persons in the South found ways to both circumvent and challenge the law. John Berry Meachum, for example, moved his school out of St. Louis, Missouri when that state passed an anti-literacy law in 1847, and re-established it as the Floating Freedom School on a steamship on the Mississippi River, which was beyond the reach of Missouri state law. After she was arrested, tried, and served a month in prison for educating free black children in Norfolk, Virginia, Margaret Crittendon Douglas wrote a book on her experiences, which helped draw national attention to the anti-literacy laws. Frederick Douglass taught himself to read while he was enslaved. A runaway slave ad published in Tuscaloosa, Alabama in 1845 complained, "[Fanny] can read and write, and so forge passes for herself." In Tennessee, "Any slave who forged a pass or certificate was to be whipped with not exceeding thirty-nine lashes; any person giving, or causing to be given ... any other instrument of writing intended to aid the slave in escape from his master was to suffer imprisonment for not less than three nor more than ten years."

Despite the risks, literacy was seen by enslaved persons as a means of advancement and liberation, and they secretly learned from and taught one another. One historian noted that 20% of the self-emancipated persons in antebellum Kentucky were able to read, and 10% were able to write. Enslaved children would trade items like marbles and oranges to white children in exchange for reading lessons, and adults sometimes learned from other adults, black and white. One enslaved man, Lucius Holsey, acquired a library of five books by selling rags: two spelling books, a dictionary, John Milton's Paradise Lost, and the Bible. With these five books, he painstakingly taught himself to read by memorizing single words.

John Hope Franklin says that despite the laws, schools for enslaved Black students existed throughout the South, including in Georgia, the Carolinas, Kentucky, Louisiana, Florida, Tennessee, and Virginia. In 1838, Virginia's free black population petitioned the state, as a group, to send their children to school outside of Virginia to bypass its anti-literacy law. They were refused.

In some cases, enslavers ignored the laws. They looked the other way when their children played school and taught enslaved children how to read and write. Some enslavers saw economic benefit in having literate enslaved persons who could undertake the enslaver's business transactions and keep their accounts. Others believed that enslaved persons should be sufficiently literate to read the Bible.

In Norfolk, Virginia, the anti-literacy law was not abolished until after the Civil War, in 1867, as a result of black residents petitioning the federal government to end it.

== See also ==
- Yumin zhengce
