= Sisters of the Holy Family (Louisiana) =

Female Black Catholic religious order

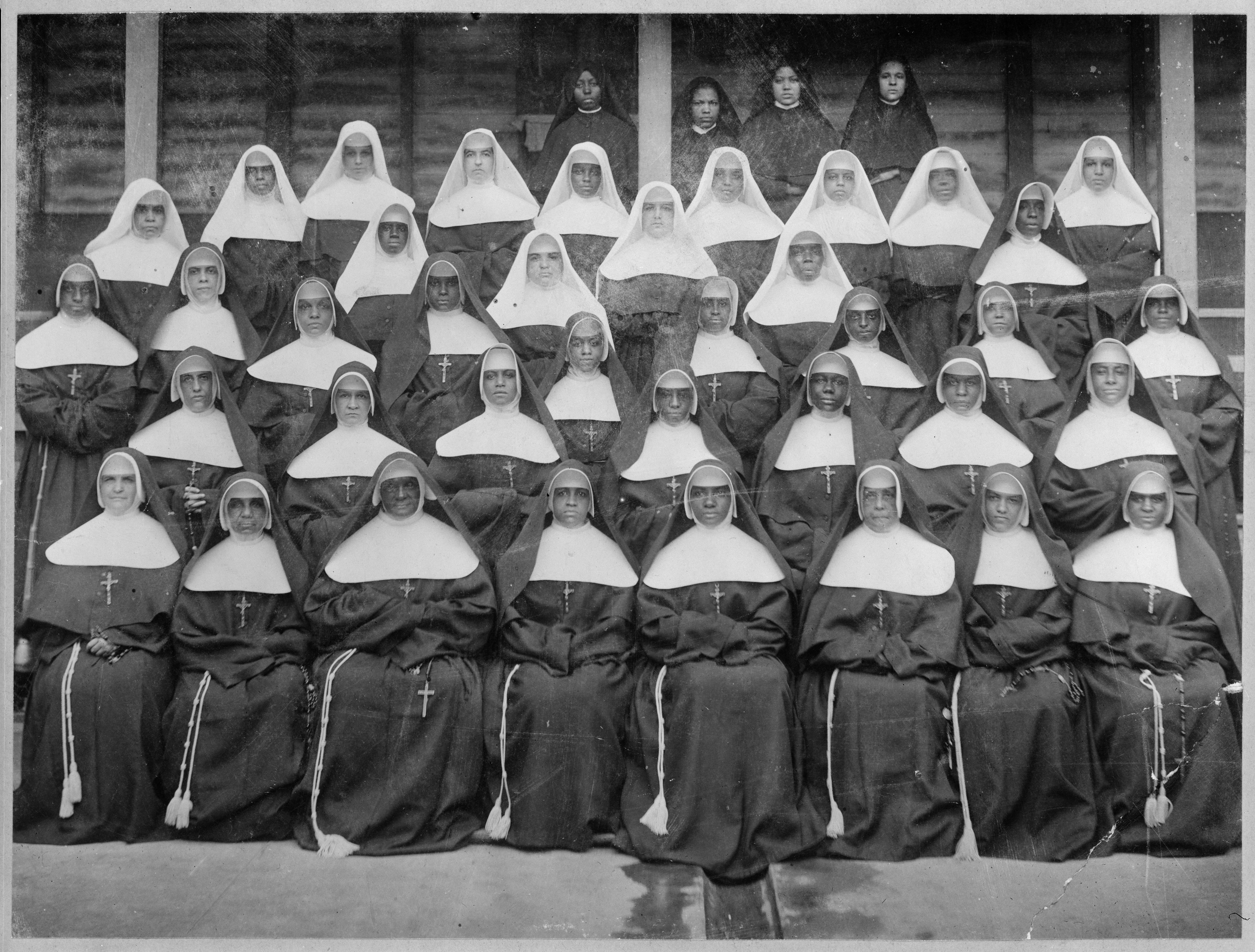
- Sisters of the Holy Family, 1899
- Abbreviation: SSF
- Formation: 1837
- Founder: Henriette DeLille
- Type: Religious institute
- Location: New Orleans, Louisiana
- Website: SistersOfTheHolyFamily.com

The Sisters of the Holy Family (SSF; French: Soeurs de la Sainte Famille) are a Catholic religious order of African-American nuns based in New Orleans, Louisiana. They were founded in 1837 as the Congregation of the Sisters of the Presentation of the Blessed Virgin Mary by Henriette DeLille. They adopted the current name in 1842.

They were the second Black religious order founded in the United States. The first was Mother Mary Lange's Oblate Sisters of Providence in Baltimore, Maryland.

== History ==
Around 1829, Henriette DeLille joined Juliette Gaudin, a Haitian, and Josephine Charles, and began efforts to evangelize enslaved persons and free persons of color in New Orleans. Around 1836, they formed the Congregation of the Sisters of the Presentation of the Blessed Virgin Mary, New Orleans' first confraternity of women of color.

Their unofficial habit was a plain blue dress. Bishop Antoine Blanc did not allow them to wear traditional habits because they were women of color.

The congregation was established under the current name in 1842. They began as a diocesan congregation and were assisted by Marie Jeanne Aliquot. She was a white French woman and was prevented by segregation law from joining a congregation of women of color. The Religious of the Sacred Heart provided Henriette, Juliette and Josephine spiritual formation and experience in formal religious community living.

The Association of the Holy Family, a lay group of free persons of color, contributed financially. They helped found the Hospice of the Holy Family, for the elderly sick and poor. Now called the Lafon Nursing Facility, it served as a long-term care facility and is the first and oldest Catholic nursing home in the United States. The sisters would take in sick and elderly women, providing care at their house on St. Bernard Avenue.

After the devastation of Hurricane Katrina in 2005, the Lafon Nursing Facility was restored and reopened in 2010. It continues to provide nursing care.

In 1850 the order founded a school for girls. The sisters also provided a home for orphans and taught enslaved persons, although Louisiana law then prohibited educating slaves.

The three women took private vows on November 21, 1852, as Bishop Antoine Blanc would not allow women of color to make public vows.

Father Etienne Rousselou, the congregation's advisor, named DeLille as mother superior. She took the name Sister Mary Theresa; however, everyone called her Mother Henriette.

Their school, St. Mary's Academy (SMA), opened on Chartres Street in December 1867.

In 1876, the sisters were finally allowed to wear their habits publicly. In 1887, their formal rule was approved by the bishop.

The academy moved to the Quadroon Ballroom on Orleans Avenue in 1881. In 1921 the sisters assumed responsibility for a school for children of color from St. Francis de Sales Church; that school had been run previously by the Sisters of the Most Holy Sacrament.

In 1965 SMA moved to a site on Chef Menteur Boulevard in New Orleans East.

The congregation has maintained their original ministries of educating youth and caring for the aged, and the poor. They have missions in Louisiana, Texas, California, Washington, D.C., and Belize. The sisters remain active in pastoral care and education ministry in Opelousas, Lafayette, and Ville Platte in the Diocese of Lafayette.

== Organization and membership ==
The Sisters of the Holy Family is a congregation of pontifical right. The motherhouse is in New Orleans, and as of 2015 its members numbered 96 sisters.

The order is headquartered a block away from the school. Their mission statement says:

“We exemplify and share the spirituality and charism of Henriette Delille with the people of God. We bring healing comfort to children, the elderly, the poor, and the powerless, especially those of African descent. As we embrace the third millennium, our love for God compels us to confront racism, all forms of injustice, discrimination, and economic oppression through evangelization and education.”

== Legacy ==
The National Museum of African American History and Culture includes historic items from black Catholic communities, including Sisters of the Holy Family.

Due to some Sisters attending Xavier University of Louisiana, and working alongside the Sisters of the Blessed Sacrament, Xavier University Archives & Special Collections also holds a small collection on the history of the Sisters of the Holy Family.

== In popular media ==
The actress Vanessa Williams produced a 2000 television movie, The Courage to Love, about Henriette Delille, in which she herself starred in the lead role.
