= Education of freed people during the Civil War =

The American Civil War led to enormous cultural changes throughout the United States. No group experienced a more radical shift than slaves who were freed as the Union Army swept through the South. While there was no initial plan for addressing the specific needs of the slave population, Union generals quickly recognized their impoverishment and suffering, and sought to provide education and material support both for civilians and for former slaves who enlisted with Union forces.

As slaves were liberated by advancing forces, education quickly became one of their highest priorities. They saw literacy as a means of empowerment and social advancement. However, economic necessities, ongoing warfare, outbreaks of cholera and dysentery, and their overwhelming numbers made education both a dangerous and difficult endeavor. Throughout the South, generals and their staffs sought to establish and maintain order by providing basic education and training.

For schools after the war see Black school. For schooling before the war see Education during the slave period in the United States.

== Education of Civilians ==
While the War Department made no initial provision for the slaves, many generals, most notably General William Tecumseh Sherman, advocated providing immediate aid and appealed to various philanthropic agencies to send teachers to provide religious and vocational instruction.

General Ulysses S. Grant was the first to deliberately and formally respond to the plight of the African-American community when he appointed General John Eaton as Superintendent for Negro Affairs in the Department of Tennessee. Eaton's authority ranged over an area that included not only Tennessee, but portions of Kentucky and Mississippi, as well. He worked to provide teachers with lodging, funding, transportation, and protection. He later divided the region into districts, developed standard curricula, and attempted to obtain standard textbooks. His efforts met with success. By 1864, the Department of Tennessee had established 74 schools in the region, serving more than 6200 pupils (Blassingame, p. 153).

== Virginia and North Carolina ==
General Benjamin Franklin Butler, who was responsible for Virginia and North Carolina, was also proactive. He appointed Lt. Col. J. B. Kinsman as chief of a Department of Negro Affairs and directed him to ensure that blacks would receive both secular and religious instruction. Philanthropic agencies provided teachers and supplies; the army provided funding, transportation, and lodging. Kinsman emphasized vocational training as well as literacy instruction. Former slaves learned carpentry, weaving, shoemaking, and other trades, as well as how to read and write. By 1864, North Carolina had more than 60 teachers and 3000 students in Kinsman's program (Blassingame, p. 153).

== The Gulf Region ==
The Department of the Gulf, which encompassed Louisiana, Mississippi, Texas, and Alabama, was overseen by Major General Nathaniel P. Banks, who established a Board of Education and sought to provide basic literacy and job training. The Board received a mandate to: establish schools in each parish, appoint teachers and require them to attend Board-sponsored annual training, develop a standard curriculum, levy taxes to provide funding, and provide books to students, at cost.

In this region, however, there was widespread opposition to African-American education, and whites often refused to help teachers; some attacked the teachers and their schools directly. When planters refused to lodge teachers, banks threatened to remove their laborers, so the planters finally crumbled under the economic pressure. Despite these tensions, by the end of 1864, the Board had successfully established 95 schools, providing instruction to more than 9500 children and 2000 adults (Blasingame, p. 154).

== Education in the Union Army ==
While the education of civilian populations was an admirable and necessary aim of the Union forces, a more pressing need was the instruction of former slaves who actually enlisted. Almost immediately, officers recognized the problems that resulted from illiteracy: verbal instructions and explanations cost valuable time, and despite the courage of these new troops, advancement without some degree of education was impossible, and this led to a loss of morale. Numerous regiments, including the 33rd, 55th, 67th, 73rd, 76th, 78th, 83rd, 88th, 89th, and the 128th received instruction from chaplains and Northern teachers. Not only was this training designed to improve the soldiers’ wartime efficacy, but by learning trades like bricklaying and carpentry, they felt more secure about their long-term stability.

Just as General Benjamin Franklin Butler had taken an active role in civilian education in North Carolina and Virginia, when he united 37 regiments to form the Twenty-Fifth Corps in December 1864, he ordered that chaplains oversee schools in each regiment: “thus, with a stroke of his pen, Butler guaranteed that 29,875 Negro soldiers would receive systematic instruction” (p. 157). Under his orders, taxes were levied to fund these schools and officers were threatened with dishonorable discharges if their soldiers did not improve in terms of discipline and education. Further, soldiers were offered tangible rewards for attending classes. Not only did learning and literacy predicate promotion, but soldiers could receive popular books, especially the Bible, exemption from certain duties, and day passes through these programs.

Thousands of freedmen received their first formal instruction through the involvement of the Union Army. These programs laid the groundwork for agencies such as the Freedmen’s Bureau and encouraged the intellectual and professional development of civilians and soldiers alike.

== See also ==
- Freedmen's Bureau
