= Bread and circuses =

Figure of speech referring to a superficial means of appeasement

"Bread and circuses" (or "bread and games"; from Latin: panem et circenses) is a metonymic phrase referring to superficial appeasement. It is attributed to Juvenal (Satires, Satire X), a Roman poet active in the late first and early second century AD, and is used commonly in cultural, particularly political, contexts.

In a political context, the phrase means to generate public approval, not by excellence in public service or public policy, but by diversion, distraction, or by satisfying the most immediate or base requirements of a populace, by offering a palliative: for example food (bread) or entertainment (circuses). Juvenal originally used it to decry the "selfishness" of common people and their neglect of wider concerns. The phrase implies a population's erosion or ignorance of civic duty as a priority.

== Ancient Rome ==
This phrase originates from Rome in Satire X of the Roman satirical poet Juvenal (c. 100 CE), who saw "bread and circuses" (panem et circenses) as emblematic of the loss of republican political liberty:

[...] iam pridem, ex quo suffragia nulli / vendimus, effudit curas; nam qui dabat olim / imperium, fasces, legiones, omnia, nunc se / continet atque duas tantum res anxius optat, / panem et circenses. [...]

— Juvenal, Satire 10.77–81
Translation:

... Already long ago, from when we sold our vote to no man, the People have abdicated our duties; for the People who once upon a time handed out military command, high civil office, legions — everything, now restrains itself and anxiously hopes for just two things: bread and circuses.

Juvenal refers to the Roman practice of providing free wheat to Roman citizens (the Annona) as well as costly circus games and other forms of entertainment as a means of gaining political power. In much modern literature, this represents the Annona as a "briberous and corrupting attempt of the Roman emperors to cover up the fact that they were selfish and incompetent tyrants". Yet Augustus disapproved even the idea of a grain dole on moral grounds, even though he and every emperor after him took the responsibility and credit for ensuring the supply to citizens who qualified for it.

== See also ==
- "Bread and Circuses" (Star Trek: The Original Series), a 1968 episode of Star Trek
- Bread and roses – Political slogan
- Colosseum – Ancient Roman amphitheater in Rome
- Instrumentum regni – Latin phase for using religion as a political tool
- List of Latin phrases
- Panem, the setting of the young adult book series The Hunger Games and its film adaptations
- Prolefeed, a word similar to "circuses," in the fictional language Newspeak of the novel Nineteen Eighty-Four
- Sportswashing – use of sporting events to distract from civil and human rights abuses.
- Theatre state - ritual entertainment as the pre-eminent element in a political system, exemplified by the ritual of Carousel in the 1967 dystopian novel Logan's Run and its 1976 film adaptation
- Yumin zhengce – Chinese political science concept

== Sources ==
- Potter, D. and D. Mattingly, Life, Death, and Entertainment in the Roman Empire. Ann Arbor (1999).
- Rickman, G., The Corn Supply of Ancient Rome, Oxford (1980).
