= Catholic Academy of Sunnyvale =

Catholic school in California, United States

Coordinates: 37.3806°N 122.0497°W

Catholic Academy of Sunnyvale is a Roman Catholic elementary school in the Diocese of San Jose San Jose, California. It has approximately 200 + students, from kindergarten to eighth grade. The last principal was Diane Rabago, but is now being managed by Susan Morissey since 2015. The school consolidated St. Cyprian School with St. Martin School in Sunnyvale, CA to form the Catholic Academy of Sunnyvale.

== History ==
In 1966, the Sisters, Servants of the Immaculate Heart of Mary, from Pennsylvania, came to St. Cyprian Parish at the request of Rev. John Gallagher. The IHM community provided the pastor with three sisters to open the school in September 1968, with an enrollment of sixty-two students in Grades 1–3.

Adding a new grade each year, the first graduation was held in 1974. In 1985, a multi-purpose hall was constructed and, in 1986, a library was added to this facility and the Church sacristy was converted for use as a Kindergarten.

The Extended Care program was begun in 1990 and in the fall of 1991, the outdoor eating area for the students had concrete padding installed. Art classes with specialists were also begun.

A major facilities expansion was completed in 2002, including a new kindergarten room, library, science lab, computer lab, counseling and tutoring rooms, and extended care facility. In addition, a new parish center and a renovated gymnasium complete the major overhaul of the school.

== Curriculum ==
The school provides a comprehensive curriculum for grades K-8 with an emphasis on core subjects including Religion, Mathematics, Language Arts, Social Studies, and Science. In addition, enrichment courses include Computer Education, Art, Music, Band, and Physical Educations. Students in upper grades experience departmentalized teaching with an emphasis on high school preparation. This includes studying a foreign language and learning how to take lecture notes.
