= James Nicholas Joubert =

French Catholic priest in the United States

James Mary Hector Nicholas Joubert de la Muraille, PSS (September 6, 1777, France – 1843, Baltimore) was a French Catholic priest in the United States. A teacher at St. Mary's Seminary in Baltimore, he co-founded the Oblate Sisters of Providence along with Mary Lange. He was a member of the Sulpicians.

== Biography ==
=== Early life ===
Joubert was born at Saint Jean d'Angely on the west coast of France on September 6, 1777. His parents were John Joseph Mary Joubert, and the former Suzanne Claire Cathering Guimbaut. His father was a lawyer.

When he was twelve years old, he was enrolled in the military school at Rebois-en-Brie. Upon graduation young Joubert entered the military until after a few years he went to work in the tax office. In 1800, at the age of twenty-three, he was posted to Saint-Domingue. When the Haitian Revolution broke out in 1803 and a number of his relatives were killed, Joubert and his uncle, C. Joubert de Maine, fled first to Cuba and then to the United States.

=== Baltimore ===
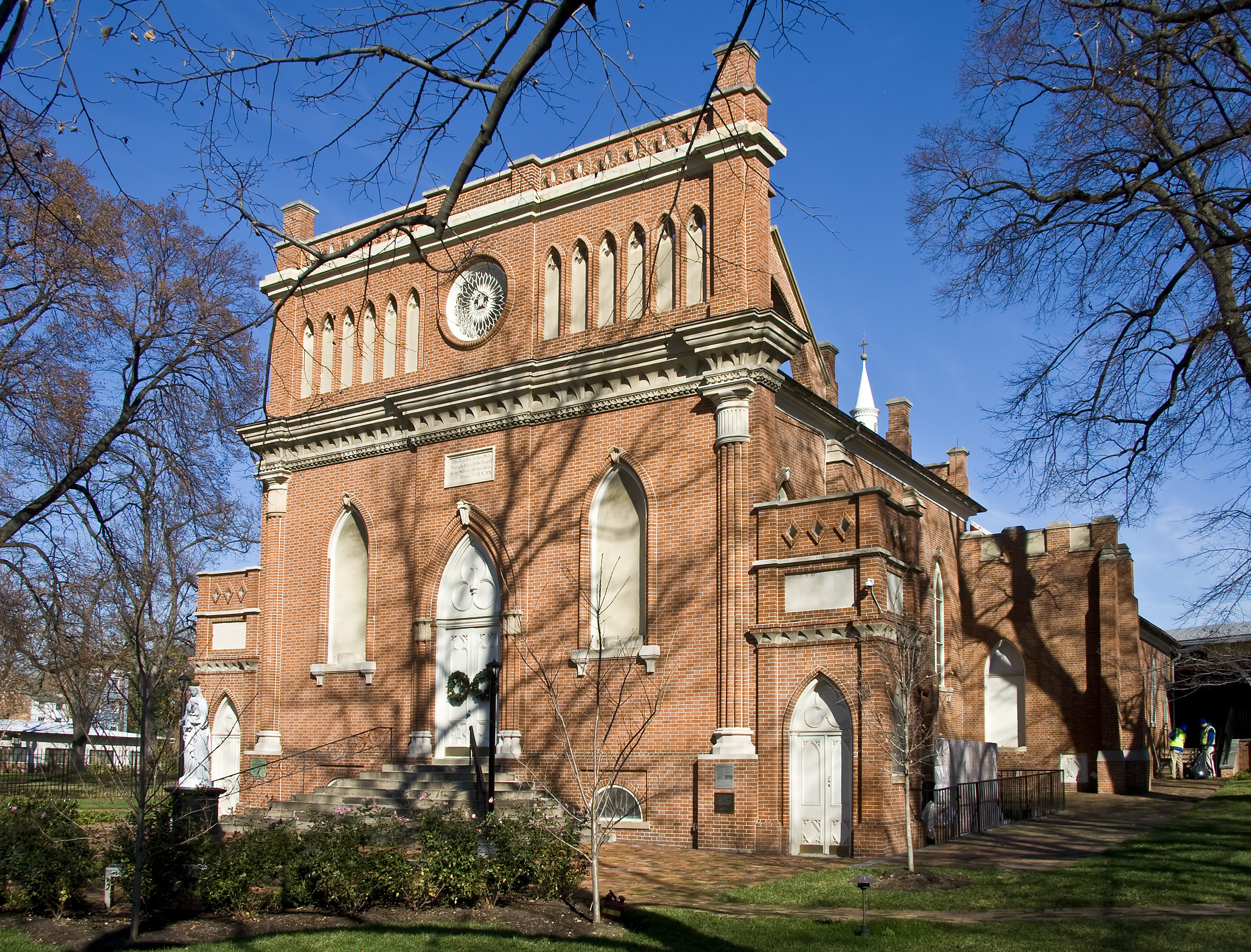
St. Mary's Seminary Chapel

He eventually found his way to Baltimore, Maryland, where obtained work teaching geography in Madame LeCombe’s fashionable school for girls. In 1805 he entered St. Mary's Seminary and was ordained a priest in 1810. Shortly after, he became a Sulpician. He taught French and geography at the college.

On August 22, 1827, while at St. Mary's Seminary, Joubert was assigned to teach Sunday school classes to African-American members of St. Mary's Lower Chapel. While English was used in the upper chapel, the language favored in the lower chapel was French, as many of the congregation were refugees from Saint-Domingue. Joubert was introduced to two African American women who were members of the Lower Chapel, Elizabeth Clarisse Lange and Marie Magdelaine Balas, who and had run a small, private school for San Domingan children, but been forced to close for lack of funds.

To further this effort, Eliza Anna Chatard, wife of a prominent Baltimore physician, agreed to solicit donations from her acquaintances. Mrs. Chatard's father-in-law, also a physician, had emigrated from Saint-Domingue. (She was also the grandmother of Silas Chatard, future Bishop of Indianapolis.) The ladies opened their school at St. Mary's Court on June 13, 1828.

Encouraged by the Archbishop of Baltimore, James Whitfield, Joubert asked Elizabeth Lange if she would consider starting a school for girls of color. They told him that they were interested in establishing a community of African-American Catholic nuns. They eventually succeeded and became the Oblate Sisters of Providence. Joubert wrote the community's first rule, incorporating the Sulpician ideal of following the rule and giving good example. He persuaded Whitfield to approve the order.

Joubert would provide direction, be chaplain, solicit financial assistance, and encourage other "women of color” to become members of this, the first religious congregation of women of color in the history of the US Catholic Church. Joubert records in his diary, that after learning that a mob of Know-Nothings had burned a convent in Charlestown, Massachusetts, he and two other priests spent the night of October 8, 1834 sleeping in the parlor of the Oblates' convent. While Mother Lange continued to manage the order's flagship St. Frances Academy, Joubert devoted his efforts to finding the funds to keep it going.

Joubert resided at St. Mary's Seminary until his death in late 1843.
