= Henriette DeLille =

American nun

Venerable Henriette Díaz DeLille SSF
- Born: March 11, 1813; New Orleans, Louisiana, United States
- Died: November 17, 1862 (aged 49); New Orleans, Louisiana, United States

Henriette Díaz DeLille, SSF (March 11, 1813 – November 17, 1862) was a Louisiana Creole of color and Catholic religious sister from New Orleans. She founded the Sisters of the Holy Family in 1836 and served as their first Mother Superior. The sisters are the second-oldest surviving congregation of African-American religious.

In 1988, the congregation formally opened the beatification process for DeLille with the Holy See. She was of mixed race: her father was a white man from France, her mother was a quadroon, and her maternal grandfather was a white man from Spain.

== Biography ==
=== Early life ===
Henriette DeLille was born in New Orleans, Louisiana, on March 11, 1813. Her mother, Marie-Josèphe "Pouponne" Díaz, was a free woman of color of New Orleans. Her father Jean-Baptiste Lille Sarpy (var. de Lille) was born about 1758 in Fumel, Lot-et-Garonne, France. Their union was a common-law marriage typical of the contemporary plaçage system. She had a brother, Jean DeLille, and other siblings.

Their maternal grandparents were Juan José (var. Jean-Joseph) Díaz, a Spanish merchant, and Henriette (Dubreuil) Laveau, a Créole of color. Their paternal grandparents were Charles Sarpy and Susanne Trenty, both natives of Fumel, France. Her maternal great-grandmother is said to be Cécile Marthe Basile Dubreuil, a woman of color considered to be a daughter of Claude Villars Dubreuil, born in 1716, who immigrated to Louisiana from France. Henriette and her family lived in the French Quarter, not far from St. Louis Cathedral.

Trained by her mother in French literature, music, and dancing, Henriette was groomed to find a white, wealthy male partner in the plaçage system, which was a type of common-law marriage. Her mother also taught her nursing skills and how to prepare medicines from herbs. As a young mixed-race woman, under her mother's watchful eye, Henriette attended many quadroon balls, a chief element of their social world. The balls were attended by creole, free women of color, and creole white men looking for young women as plaçage partners.

Raised Catholic in the French tradition, DeLille was drawn instead to a strong religious belief in the Catholic Church's teaching and resisted the life her mother suggested. She became an outspoken opponent of plaçage, in which generally young, white French or American men had extended relationships or common-law marriages with free women of color. The men often later married white, American women after they were established financially. The men entered into contracts with the mothers of the young women of color, promising support and sometimes education of their mixed-race children, as well as financial settlements. In cases where a young woman was enslaved, the man might free her and their children. Some men maintained a relationship with a woman of color after marriage, while others remained bachelors. DeLille believed the system was a violation of the Catholic sacrament of marriage.

Henriette was influenced by Sister Marthe Fontier, who had opened a school in New Orleans for girls of color. In 1827, at the age of 14, the well-educated Henriette began teaching at the local Catholic school. Over the next several years, her devotion to caring for and educating the poor grew, causing conflict with her mother.

DeLille received the sacrament of confirmation in 1834. During documentation of the beatification process for DeLille, the congregation found funeral records from the 1820s "that suggested that as a teenager, she may have given birth to two sons, each named Henry Bocno. Both boys died at a young age". (It was customary to name the first son after the father. If the child died, the next male born would be given the father's name.) The archdiocesan archivist Charles Nolan said in 2005 that, even if DeLille "had given birth to two children out of wedlock, it happened two years before her confirmation in 1834". Her biographer, Benedictine priest Cyprian Davis, said that her confirmation showed her increased commitment to God, as did her life in the following years.

=== Sisters of the Holy Family ===
==== Founding ====
In 1835, DeLille's mother Marie-Josèphe suffered a nervous breakdown. Later that year, the court declared her incompetent and granted DeLille control of her mother's assets. After providing for her mother's care, DeLille sold all her remaining property.

In 1836 she used the sale proceeds to found a small unrecognized congregation of religious sisters, which she named as the Sisters of the Presentation. The original members consisted of DeLille, seven other young Créole women, and a young French woman. They cared for the sick, helped the poor, and instructed free and enslaved children and adults. They took into their home some older women who needed more than visitation and thereby opened America's first Catholic home for the elderly.

==== Opposition ====
Her brother Jean was strongly opposed to her activities. Like other family members, he could pass for white (the DeLille children were octoroons, or one-eighth Black). He felt that his sister's activities within the Créole community could expose his partial African ancestry to his white associates. Estranged from Henriette, he moved with his wife and children to a small Créole of color community in Iberia Parish, Louisiana.

DeLille also faced opposition from the public and from many in the church, as at the time racism ruled the day and Black women were not seen as worthy of religious life (or the religious habit). Henriette had not been able to join an existing congregation due to these prejudices, and when she formed her own congregation, they were not allowed by Bishop Antoine Blanc to wear a habit. They were also made by him to take private rather than public vows, such that there is debate as to whether DeLille was ever a fully recognized religious sister during her life. She would never be able to publicly wear the congregation's habit.

==== Recognition ====
In 1837, the congregation's advisor Etienne Rousselon secured formal recognition from the Holy See. DeLille took the position of superior general in the congregation. She was the second African-American to ever serve in such a position, after Mary Lange of the Oblate Sisters of Providence.

DeLille took the religious name Mary Theresa; however, everyone called her "Mother Henriette". In 1842, the congregation changed its name to the Sisters of the Holy Family.

=== Death ===
DeLille died on Sunday, November 16, 1862, at the age of 49, during the American Civil War, when the city was occupied by Union troops. Friends attributed her death to a life of service, poverty, and hard work. In her will, she freed a slave that she owned named Betsy.

== Legacy ==
At the time of DeLille's death, the congregation had 12 members. The sisters were noteworthy for their care of the sick and the dying during the yellow fever epidemics that struck New Orleans in 1853 and 1897.

By 1909, the Holy Family Sisters had grown to 150 members; it operated parochial schools in New Orleans that served 1,300 students. In this period, Louisiana had disenfranchised most African Americans by raising barriers to voter registration, and it imposed legal segregation of public facilities, including schools. By 1950, membership in the congregation peaked at 400.

In modern times, its members serve the poor by operating free schools for children, nursing homes, and retirement homes in New Orleans and Shreveport, Louisiana; Washington, D.C; Galveston, Texas; Little Rock, Arkansas; and California in the United States; and a mission in Belize.

The city of New Orleans named a street after her in 2011, the same year New Orleans Archbishop Gregory Aymond instituted a "family prayer" ending with an intercessory call in her name, to be said at every Sunday Mass held in the archdiocese.

== Veneration ==
In 1988, her congregation opened the cause for her beatification with the Holy See (a first for an African American) and DeLille was given the title of Servant of God by the pope. Her cause was endorsed "unanimously" in 1997 by the United States Catholic bishops.

Pope Benedict XVI approved her heroic virtue and named her venerable on March 27, 2010. The Congregation for the Causes of Saints gave its formal assent on June 22, 2010, for the commencement of the cause of beatification with the declaration of "nihil obstat" (nothing against). In order for the beatification process to proceed, a miracle is needed. A claimed miracle was being investigated in 2005, and by 2017 other miracles attributed to her were under medical scrutiny. In 2021, it was reported that the most recent alleged miracle could not be confirmed, but another was under investigation. In 2023, Waldery Hilgeman joined the cause as postulator in Rome.

== In popular media ==
- In 2001, the Lifetime television channel premiered a movie based on the life of Henriette DeLille, The Courage to Love, starring Vanessa L. Williams and Gil Bellows.
