= Instrumentum regni =

Latin phase for using religion as a political tool

Instrumentum regni (literally, "instrument of monarchy", therefore "of government") is a Latin phrase perhaps inspired by Tacitus, used to express the exploitation of religion by State or ecclesiastical polity as a means of controlling the masses, or in particular to achieve political and mundane ends.

== History ==
The concept expressed by the phrase has undergone various forms and has been taken up by several writers and philosophers throughout history. Among these Polybius, Lucretius, Machiavelli, Montesquieu, Vittorio Alfieri and Giacomo Leopardi.

Among the oldest and most important there was undoubtedly the Greek historian Polybius, who in his Histories says:

I believe that it is the very thing which among other peoples is an object of reproach, I mean superstition, which maintains the cohesion of the Roman State. These matters are clothed in such pomp and introduced to such an extent into their public and private life that nothing could exceed it, a fact which will surprise many. My own opinion at least is that they have adopted this course for the sake of the common people. It is a course which perhaps would not have been necessary had it been possible to form a state composed of wise men, but as every multitude is fickle, full of lawless desires, unreasoned passion, and violent anger, the multitude must be held in by invisible terrors and suchlike pageantry. For this reason I think, not that the ancients acted rashly and at haphazard in introducing among the people notions concerning the gods and beliefs in the terrors of hell, but that the moderns are most rash and foolish in banishing such beliefs.

— Polybius

Before Polybius, a similar thesis was expressed in the fifth century BC. from the Athenian politician and writer Critias, disciple of Socrates, in a satirical drama called Sisyphus, of which a long fragment has been handed down to us.

In the Renaissance the concept was taken up by Niccolò Machiavelli in his The Prince.

== See also ==
- Bread and circuses, also known as Panem et circenses – Figure of speech referring to a superficial means of appeasement
- Opium of the people – Metaphorical term for religion
- Separation of church and state – Principle to separate religious and civil institutions
