= Sisters, Servants of the Immaculate Heart of Mary =

Catholic religious institute of sisters founded in 1845

- Established: November 10, 1845; 180 years ago
- Founders: Theresa Maxis Duchemin, IHM; Louis Florent Gillet, CSsR
- Type: Centralized Religious Institute of Consecrated Life of Pontifical Right (for Women)
- Purpose: Committed to proclaiming the Gospel message in the spirit of Jesus the Redeemer
- Location: 2300 Adams Ave, Scranton PA 610 West Elm Avenue, Monroe, Michigan. USA
- Members: 300 (2017)
- Superior General: Sr. Ellen Maroney, IHM
- Post-nominal initials: IHM
- Affiliations: Roman Catholic
- Website: www.ihmsisters.org

The Sisters, Servants of the Immaculate Heart of Mary (I.H.M.) is a Catholic religious institute of sisters, founded in 1845 by Fr. Louis Florent Gillet, CSsR, and Mother Theresa Maxis Duchemin, a co-founder of the Oblate Sister of Providence.

Via their first Superior, Mother Duchemin, they were the first predominantly White order founded by a Black Catholic (though the order hid this fact for 160 years).

Founded (and still headquartered) in Monroe, Michigan, the sisters originally began as teachers. They have since added ministries of: pastoral care in hospitals, long-term care facilities and other health care settings; parish ministry and outreach to poor communities and individuals in need; social services; working with those with AIDS; providing spiritual direction and retreats; advocacy efforts; programs and services for older adults in a variety of settings; and working to improve the environment.

The IHM is divided among three separate congregations. The Motherhouse currently houses more than 200 sisters, more than 100 of whom are aging and require supportive care.

== History ==
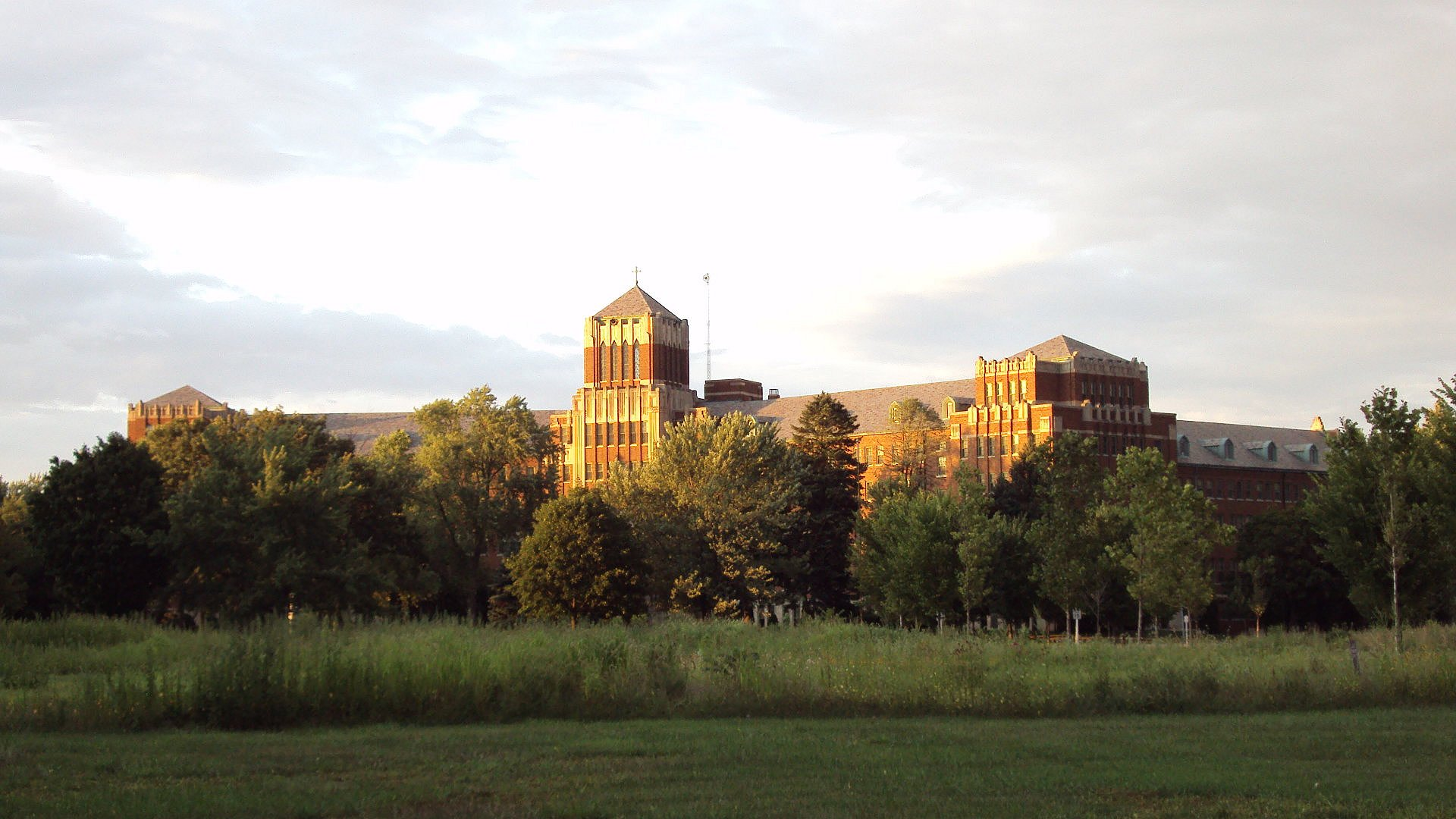
The now vacant St. Mary Academy seen from West Elm Avenue in Monroe

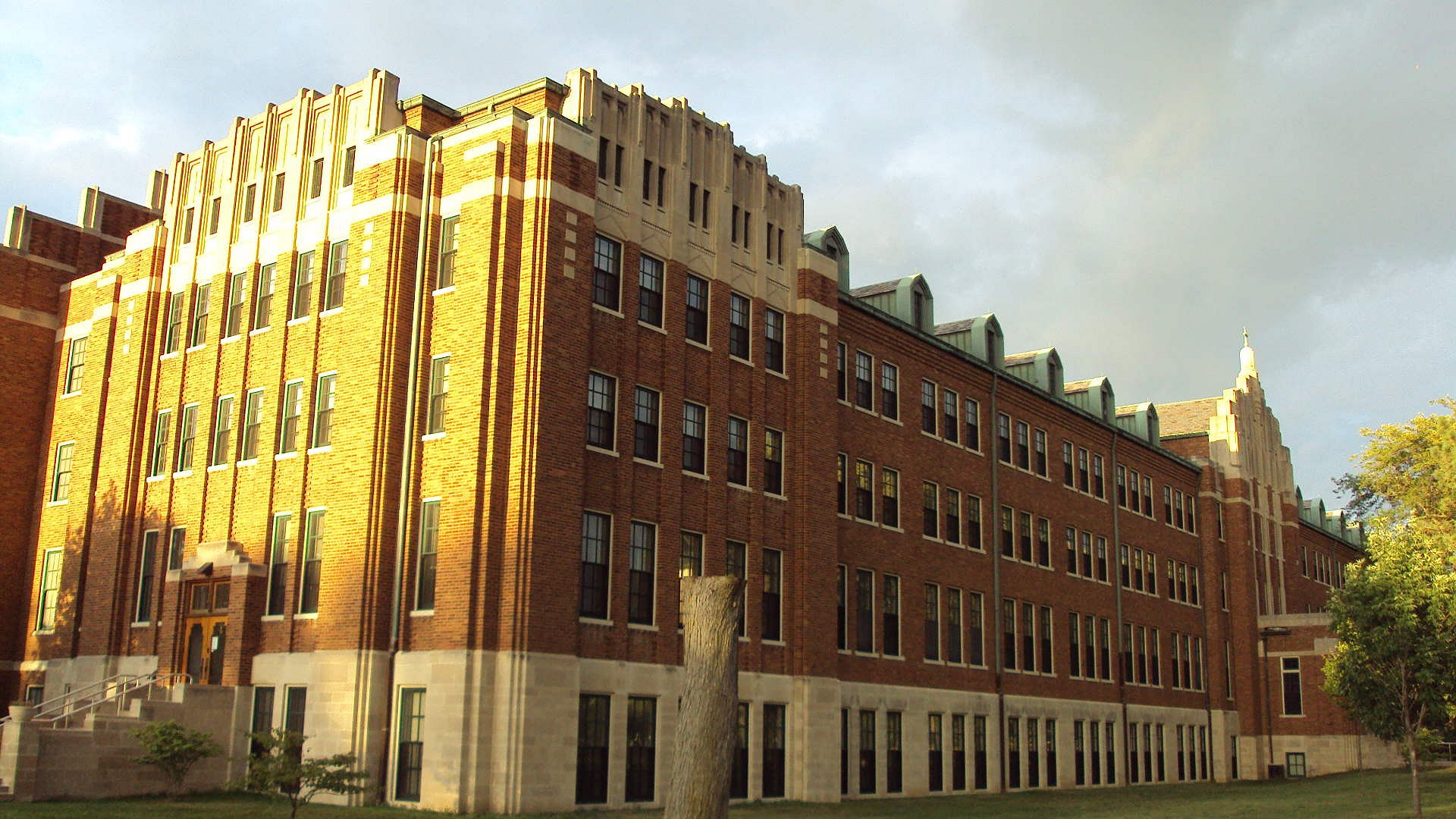
The Mother House on the IHM campus as seen up close

The beginnings of the institute came about in 1845 shortly after Father Louis Florent Gillet, C.Ss.R., arrived in Monroe, Michigan, to become the pastor of St. Mary Parish. On November 10, Gillet and Theresa Maxis Duchemin, a biracial member of the Oblate Sisters of Providence in Baltimore, established the institute in Monroe.

Father Gillet found that Monroe had no school for the daughters of French Canadians and their descendants, most of whom were Catholic. He petitioned the local bishop, Peter Paul Lefevere, coadjutor bishop of Detroit, for a religious institute to assume teaching duties. The bishop declined, so Gillet invited three women to form a new religious congregation. It would become known as the Sisters, Servants of the Immaculate Heart of Mary.

The co-foundress and first religious superior of the Monroe community was Mother Theresa Maxis Duchemin, one of the first members of Oblate Sisters of Providence of Baltimore the first religious congregation established in the country for women of African descent.

On January 15, 1846, the first St. Mary Academy in Monroe opened with 40 students.In 1858, the sisters established a mission to serve the German-speaking Catholic children of Pennsylvania, at the request of the Bishop of Philadelphia, the now-sainted John Neumann.

As a result of this mission, a dispute broke out between the bishops of Detroit and Philadelphia regarding their jurisdiction over the Sisters. Mother Theresa was faulted by Bishop Lefevre for this and was removed from her office of Superior General. She was sent to the mission in Pennsylvania. Shortly after this, in 1859, the Sisters in that state separated from the community in Michigan and were established as an independent congregation under the Bishop of Philadelphia.

This congregation later further split into two more, one based in Scranton, Pennsylvania (founded in 1871), and the other in Chester County, Pennsylvania.

In 1920, St. Mary Academy and College had outgrown its facilities in Monroe. The institute made plans to construct a new college facility. The Sisters initially planned to build the new campus in Monroe, but Bishop Michael Gallagher invited them to build in nearby Detroit. There the college would have a larger field of influence and could offer a Catholic higher education to thousands of young women who might otherwise not have such an opportunity. The Sisters built their new college in Detroit and named it Marygrove College.

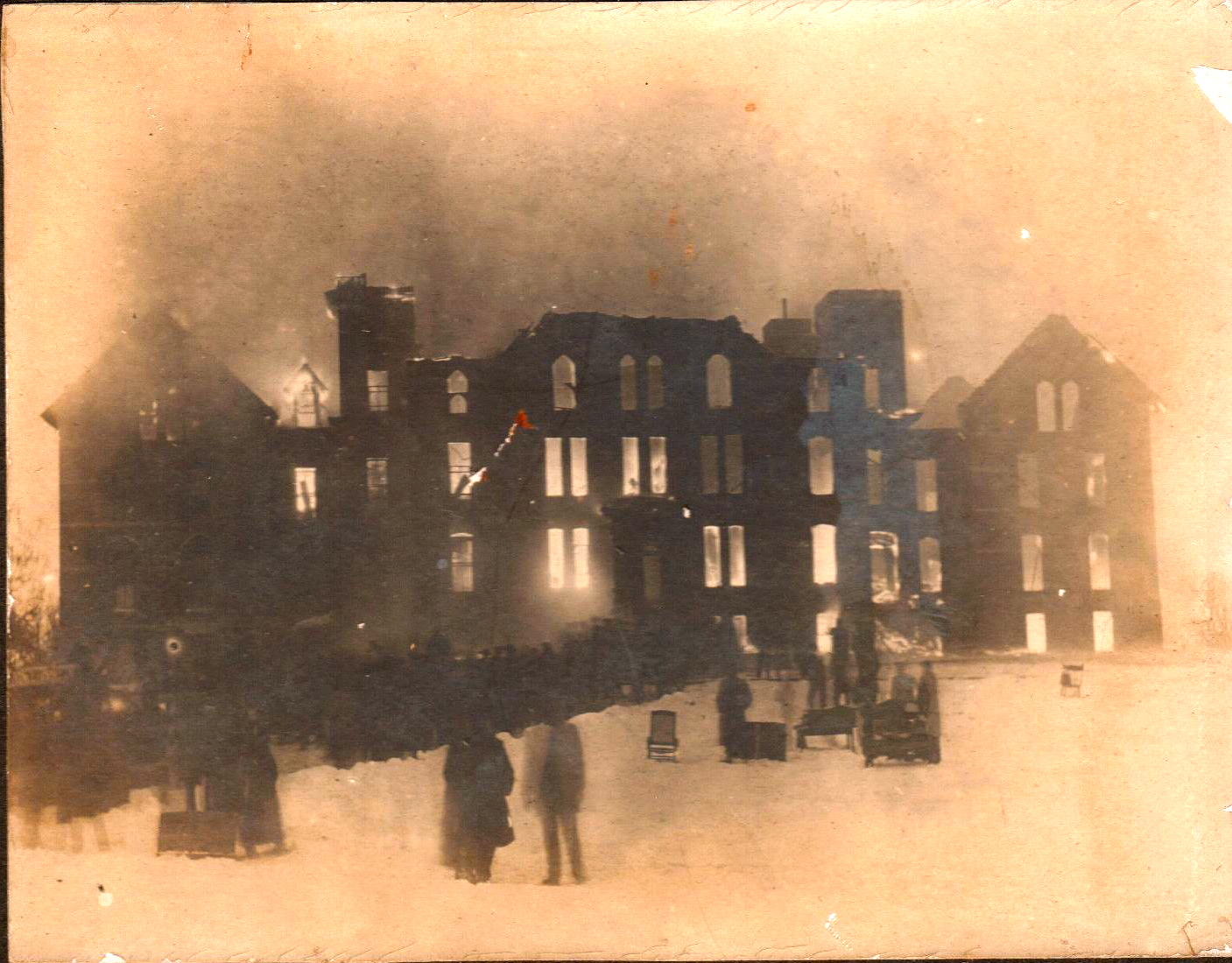
Photograph of the late stages of the fire

On June 3, 1929, St. Mary Academy in Monroe was destroyed by fire. This caused extreme difficulties for the IHM institute, as they were burdened with heavy debts from the building of Marygrove College. The cost of rebuilding the motherhouse and academy in Monroe was prohibitive.

With the onset soon afterward of the Great Depression of 1929, their financial woes increased. Nevertheless, the institute finished the reconstruction and moved into their new facilities in 1932. The congregation established Marian and Immaculata high schools in the Detroit area, and Immaculate Heart of Mary High School in Westchester, Illinois.

In 1948, the Michigan congregation began its first missionary work outside the continental United States when the Sisters opened a mission in Cayey, Puerto Rico.

In 2008, the Sisters opened Detroit Cristo Rey High School; they co-sponsor it with the Congregation of St. Basil.

Struggling with enrollment and financial issues, Marygrove College ceased operations in 2019.

== Acknowledgement of foundress Duchemin ==
Their co-founder, Mother Duchemin, was the first African American to found a predominantly White order. She was one of the earliest Black Mother Superiors in the nation. She was also the first US-born Black Catholic to become a religious sister.

The IHM sisters, however, scrubbed their records of Duchemin for 160 years.

"[They] did not want to be associated with a black sister. It was "embarrassing" and "unpleasant," as sisters wrote in various letters. It would scare white people away from their ministries... before the 1980s, novices didn't even learn about Duchemin in formation... At one point, they even enlisted a cardinal to intervene in the publication of a book that might have outed them as having been co-founded by a black woman."

In 1992, an IHM sister, Margaret Gannon, published letters acknowledging Duchemin and her significance; this began a period of collaboration between the IHM and Oblate sisters (the latter of whom had always acknowledged Duchemin as their own co-founder), as well as a more general acknowledgement of Duchemin within the IHM community.

== Educational institutions ==
=== Schools ===
- Our Lady of Lourdes Regional School, Coal Township, Pennsylvania
- Detroit Cristo Rey High School, Detroit, Michigan (co-sponsored)
- Our Lady of Guadalupe Middle School, Detroit, Michigan (co-sponsored)
- Our Lady of Lourdes Academy, Miami, Florida
- Villa Maria Academy, Immaculata (Lower School) & Malvern, Pennsylvania (high school)
- Colegio Villa Maria Miraflores, Lima, Peru
- Colegio Villa Maria La Planicie, Lima, Peru
- Colegio Inmaculado Corazón, Lima, Peru
- Villa Maria Academy (founded in 1940), Santiago, Chile
- Marian High School, Bloomfield Hills, Michigan
- Colegio San Antonio, Bellavista, Peru, (founded on 1928)
- Epiphany Catholic School, Miami, Florida
- St. Francis de Sales Roman Catholic Church, West Philadelphia
- St. Ephrem School, Bensalem, Pennsylvania

Defunct

- Girls Catholic Central High School, Detroit, Michigan
- Hall of the Divine Child, Monroe, Michigan
- Immaculata High School, Detroit, Michigan
- Immaculate Heart of Mary High School, Westchester, Illinois (absorbed by St. Joseph High)
- St. Mary's Academy, Monroe, Michigan (merged with Monroe Catholic Central High to form St. Mary Catholic Central High School)

=== Colleges and universities ===
- Immaculata University, near Philadelphia, Pennsylvania
- Marywood University, Scranton, Pennsylvania

Defunct

- Marygrove College, Detroit, Michigan

== In the arts ==
In 2012, the Monroe campus was used for filming numerous scenes of Arnaud Desplechin's movie Jimmy P: Psychotherapy of a Plains Indian (2013), which was entered in the 2013 Cannes Film Festival, depicting the now vanished Winter Veteran Hospital of Topeka, Kansas.
