= Marygrove College =

Catholic graduate college in Detroit, Michigan, US (1905–2019)

Coordinates: 42°24′56.2″N 83°9′20.5″W

- Former name: St. Mary's College
- Type: Private graduate college
- Active: 1905–December 17, 2019
- Affiliations: Roman Catholic (Sisters, Servants of the Immaculate Heart of Mary)
- Academic affiliations: NAICU; ACCU; CIC
- President: Elizabeth A. Burns, MD
- Postgraduates: 1,713
- Location: Detroit, Michigan, U.S.
- Campus: 1,250 acres (5.1 km^{2}); Urban/city
- Colors: Gold & green
- Website: marygrove.edu
- Marygrove College
- U.S. National Register of Historic Places
- Interactive map
- Built: 1925
- Architect: Oscar D. Bohlen
- NRHP reference No.: 100007930
- Added to NRHP: July 11, 2022

Marygrove College was a private Catholic graduate college from 1905 to 2019 in Detroit, Michigan, United States. It was affiliated with the Sisters, Servants of the Immaculate Heart of Mary.

== History ==
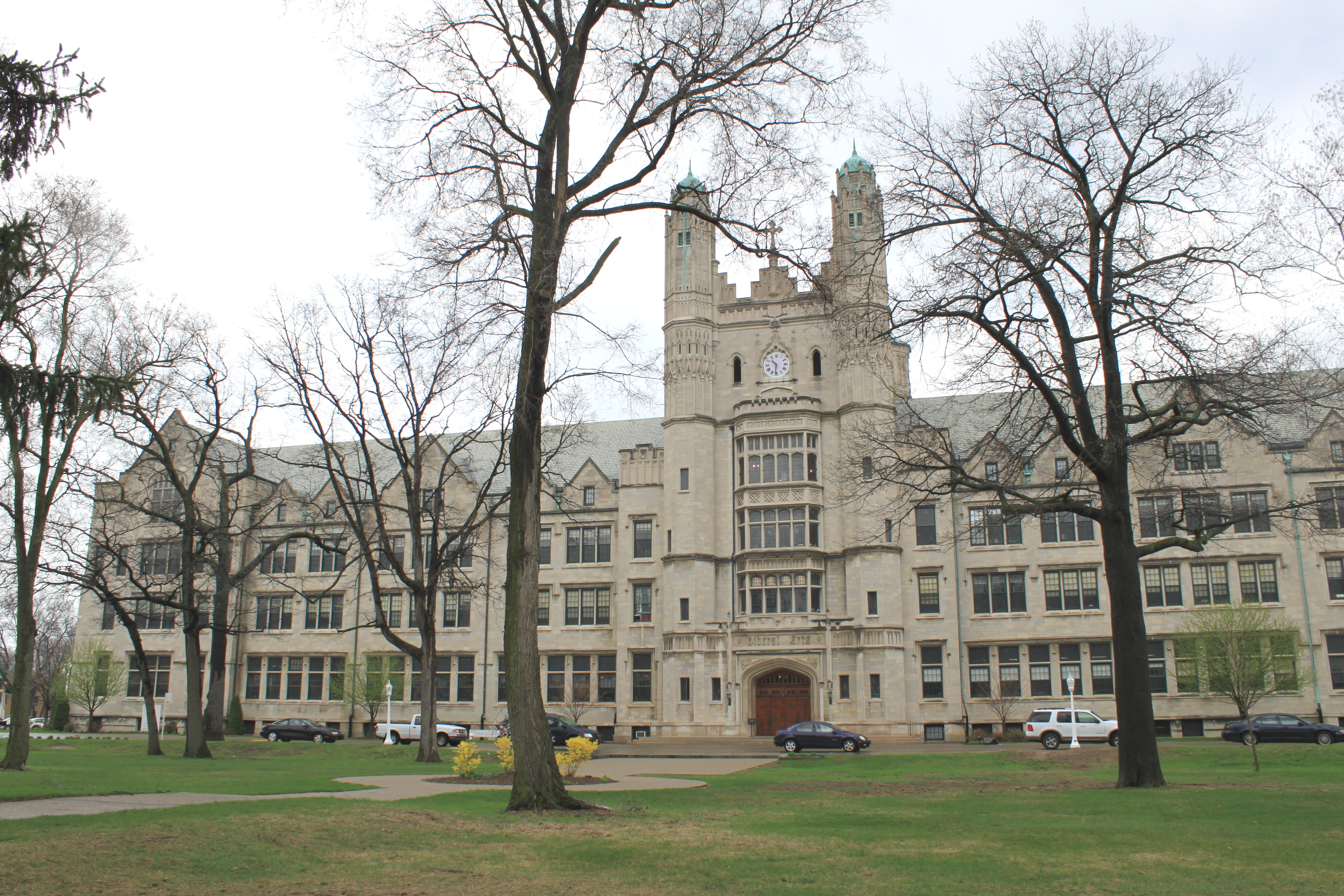
Liberal Arts Building

The college grew out of a postgraduate tutorial offered to one young woman graduate of St. Mary's Academy in Monroe, Michigan, in 1899. By 1905 it had grown to a two-year college for women and in 1910, it became a four-year college chartered to grant degrees. It was then known as St. Mary's College. The college moved to its current location in Detroit in 1927, and at that time became known as Marygrove College. When it moved to Detroit, its president was George Hermann Derry, who was the first lay person to serve as a president of a Catholic women's college in the United States.

In the decades after World War I, Marygrove College was an important local center of Catholic social action. Faculty members were chosen for their education, character, and faith, and President Derry encouraged each student to look beyond the prospect of eventual marriage and to become capable of "doing her part in the world's work in whatever sphere of life she may be placed". By 1936, the college catalog spoke in far more emphatic terms of female independence. In 1937, Sister Honora Jack became the college's first woman president. In 1938, the college accepted its first black student.

Marygrove College was originally a women's college. It became co-educational in about 1970. Glenda D. Price was appointed as the college's first African-American woman president in 1988. Price retired in 2006, but she continued to be active in Detroit's community revival, including her appointment to the city's financial advisory board.

Several controversial events occurred on campus in its final years, including protests over the use of college facilities by the LGBT group, DignityUSA, and the opening of a Muslim prayer room.

In 2016, Elizabeth Burns, a Marygrove alumna, became the final president of the college.

The college closed all undergraduate programs at the end of the Fall 2017 semester ostensibly to focus exclusively on graduate programs with a reduced staff and faculty. It had around 1,000 undergraduates in the college at the time. On June 7, 2019, the school administration announced it would cease operation the Fall 2019 semester.

The contents of the library were transferred to the Internet Archive, which imported the catalog into Open Library and had over 50,000 scanned books online by March 2020.

The school's chapel was used by St. Peter Claver Catholic Church, a nearby parish, when its roof collapsed in 2018.

== Campus ==
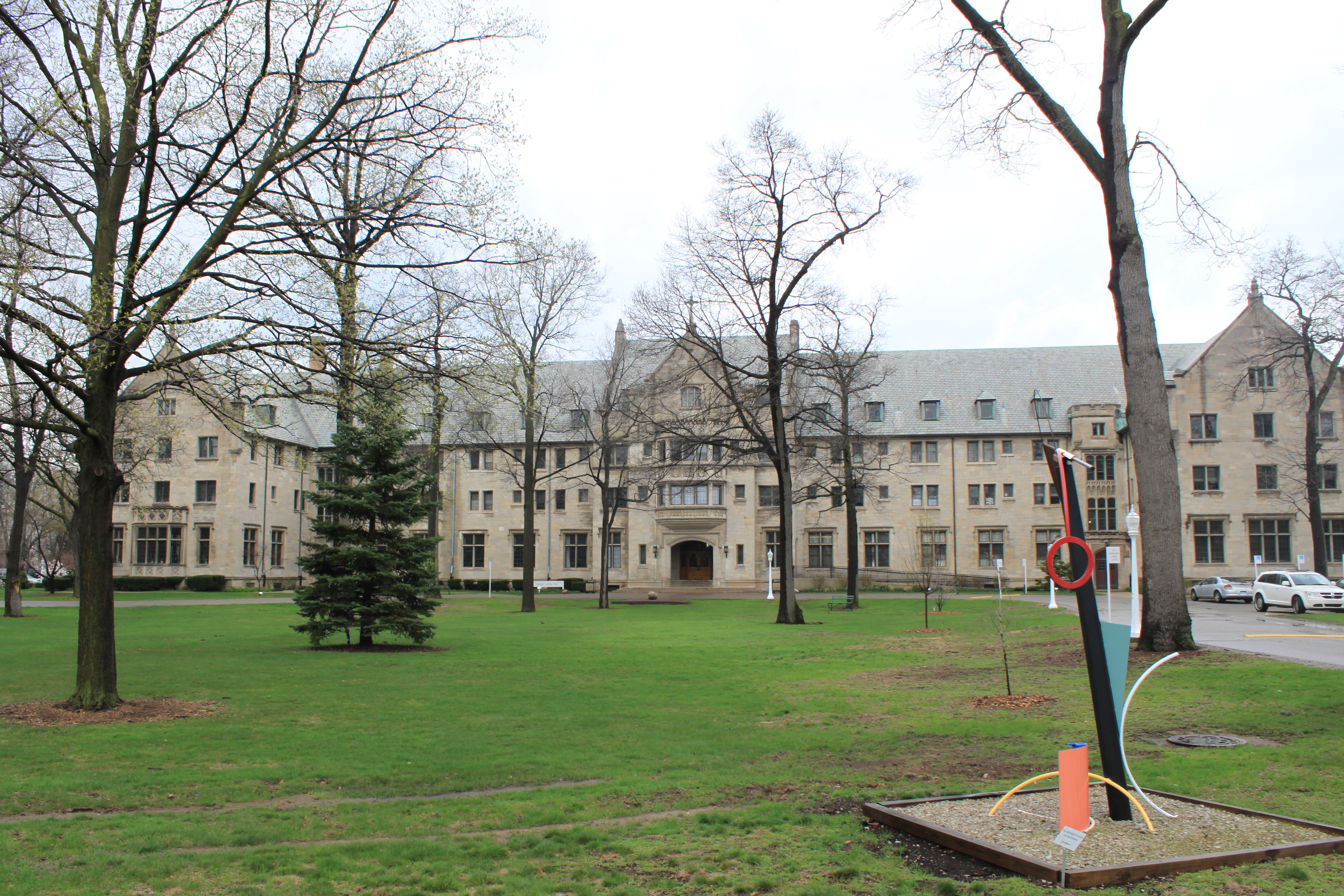
Madame Cadillac Hall

The college encompassed a 53-acre (21 ha) campus that included large lawns and mature trees. The Madame Cadillac and Liberal Arts buildings, by architect D.A. Bohlen & Son, were Tudor and Gothic structures with stained glass windows, wrought iron gates, carved wood decorations, high ceilings, arched doorways, and carved stonework. The campus was listed on the National Register of Historic Places in 2022.

== Athletics ==
The Marygrove athletic teams were called the Mustangs. The college was a member of the National Association of Intercollegiate Athletics (NAIA), primarily competing in the Wolverine–Hoosier Athletic Conference (WHAC) from 2012–13 to the fall of the 2017–18 academic year. They were also a member of the United States Collegiate Athletic Association (USCAA) from 2002–03 to the fall of the 2017–18 academic year. The Mustangs previously competed as an NAIA Independent within the Association of Independent Institutions (AII) from 2008–09 to 2011–12.

Marygrove competed in 15 intercollegiate varsity sports: Men's sports included basketball, cross country, golf, lacrosse, soccer, baseball, and track & field (indoor and outdoor); while women's sports included basketball, cross country, golf, soccer, track & field (indoor and outdoor) and volleyball.

The college added golf to its list of athletic programs with the installation of a new golf practice facility in the fall of 2010. Marygrove's golf practice facility, designed by world-renowned golf course architect Tom Doak, offered an urban land use plan, incorporating golf practice and other athletic facilities on a small urban land tract. In addition to the unique use of urban land for golf, the Golf Practice Facility incorporated environment-friendly land use and techniques, including minimal disruption to current trees, and used recycled water for irrigation and natural pesticides.

With the August 2017 announcement of the closing of the school's undergraduate programs, the school also announced that all athletics would cease after the 2017 fall season.

== Accreditation ==
Marygrove was first accredited by the North Central Association of Colleges and Secondary Schools in 1926.

Marygrove was accredited by NCA's (North Central Association) Higher Learning Commission, the Michigan State Department of Education, and the Council of Social Work and Education.
