= St. Mary's Academy (New Orleans) =

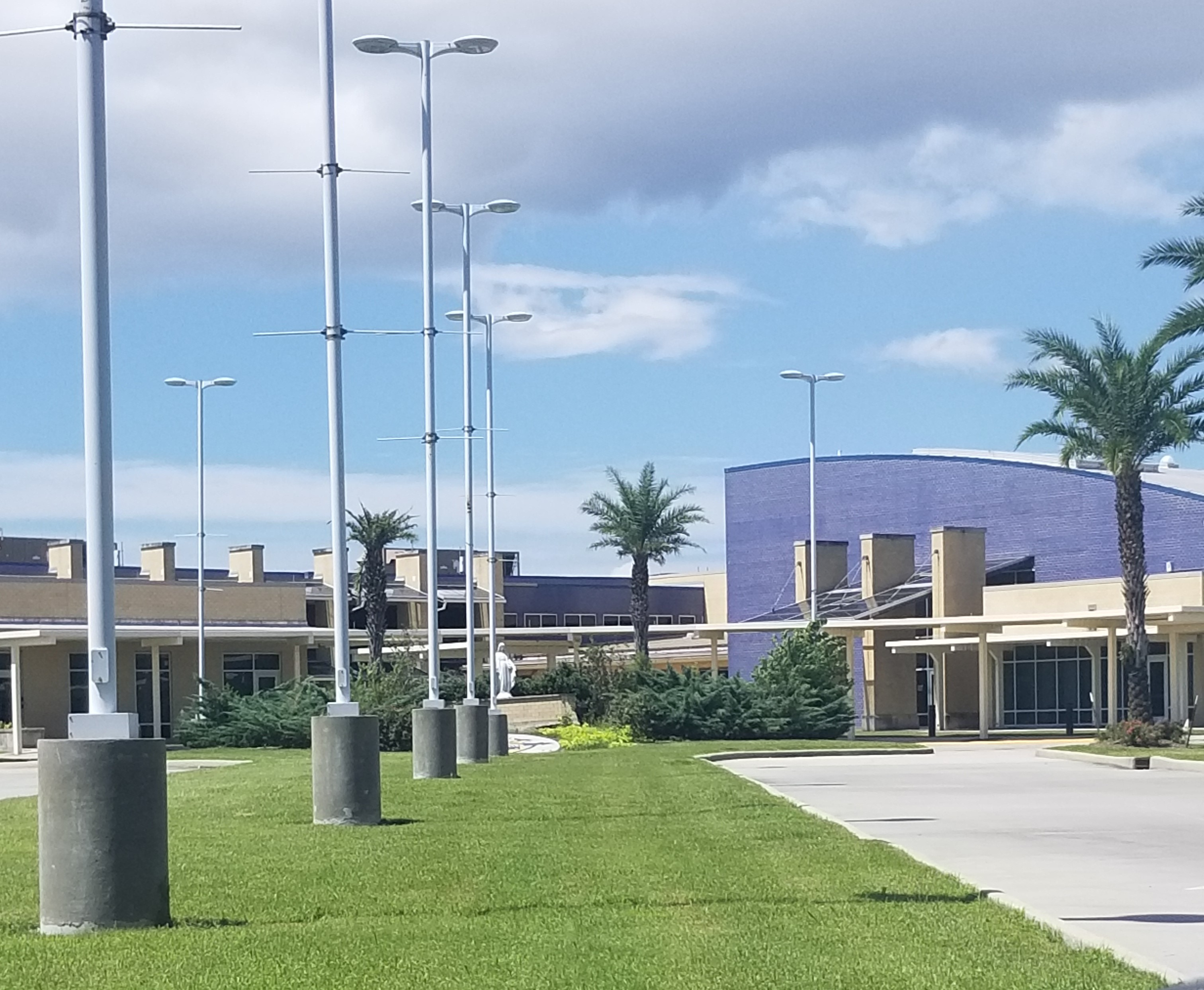

Location
- 6905 Chef Menteur Boulevard; New Orleans, Louisiana 70126; United States; 30°0′49″N 90°0′27″W

Information
- Type: Private, All-Girls
- Motto: “No Excellence Without Hard Labor”
- Religious affiliation: Catholic Church
- Founded: 1867
- Founder: Sisters of the Holy Family (Louisiana)
- President: Pamela M. Rogers
- Dean: Mrs. Pamela Greenwood
- Teaching staff: 46.3 (FTE) (2019–20)
- Grades: PK–12
- Gender: Girls and boys (up to 7th grade)
- Student to teacher ratio: 8.7 (2019–20)
- Language: English
- Colors: Royal Blue and Gold
- Sports: Softball, Volleyball, Track, and Basketball
- Mascot: Cougar
- Nickname: Maryites
- Team name: Cougars
- Accreditation: Southern Association of Colleges and Schools
- School fees: $990 (2023-24, high school)
- Tuition: $9,300 (2023-24, high school); year uncertain: $5,000 Pre-K $6,000 K-2 $6,700 3-7
- Alumni: SMA Alumnae Association
- Athletic Director: Ernest Watson
- Website: http://www.smaneworleans.com

St. Mary's Academy is a private Catholic K-12 school in New Orleans, Louisiana run by the Sisters of the Holy Family. Founded in 1867, it is one of the oldest Black Catholic schools in the country, and is the sister school for St. Augustine High School located in New Orleans, Louisiana.

It admits girls and boys until grade 7, and admits only girls for grades 8-12. The academy has a long tradition as a private Catholic college preparatory co-educational elementary and a middle/high school for young women.

== History ==
The school was founded in 1867 by the Sisters of the Holy Family, the second Black Catholic religious order in the United States, as a place where Black children could be educated during segregation. The order's founder, Venerable Henriette DeLille, was a Creole of color who has since become venerated within the Church.

The school has undergone two moves in its history, having started closer to the heart of the city (in the French Quarter), next to the sisters' convent at 350 Chartres Street. It moved within the neighborhood after 14 years, and came to its present location in New Orleans East in 1965.

The school built a brand-new facility following Hurricane Katrina, which heavily damaged the previous structure. The new building, which began serving male students in the lower school, was completed in 2011.

In September 2022, the school announced the hiring of its first-ever lay president, Pamela M. Rogers.

=== Pythagorean theorem proofs ===
In 2023, students Calcea Johnson and Ne'Kiya Jackson each independently created new proofs for the Pythagorean theorem using trigonometry. It had previously been thought to be impossible for 2,000 years. The students were featured on multiple news outlets including 60 Minutes, and their proofs were subsequently published in The American Mathematical Monthly.

== Athletics ==
St. Mary's Academy athletics competes in the LHSAA.

== Notable alumni ==
- Leah Chase, Louisiana Creole chef
- Dana Douglas, United States circuit judge of the United States Court of Appeals for the Fifth Circuit, former United States magistrate judge of the United States District Court for the Eastern District of Louisiana
