= Margaret Crittendon Douglass =

American educator

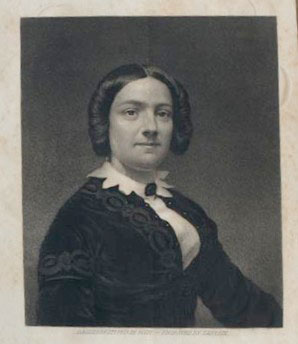
Photo of Margaret Crittendon Douglass, author of Education Laws of Virginia: The Personal Narrative of Mrs. Margaret Douglass

Margaret Crittendon Douglass (born c. 1822; year of death unknown) was a Southern white woman who served one month in jail in 1854 for teaching free black children to read in Norfolk, Virginia. Refusing to hire a defense attorney, she defended herself in court and later published a book about her experiences. The case drew public attention to the highly restrictive laws against black literacy in the pre-Civil War American South.

== Early life ==
Douglass was born in 1822 in Washington, D.C., but moved in her childhood to Charleston, South Carolina, where she married. By age fourteen, she had given birth to a daughter, Hannah Rosa. She also birthed a son, who died. Nothing is known about her husband. In 1845, she and her daughter relocated to Norfolk, Virginia, where she established herself in a modest apartment in a tenement neighborhood and made ends meet by running her own business as a seamstress and vest maker. She chose not to participate in social activities with her white neighbors in the nearby tenements, who she felt were "not of the most refined class". She notes in her memoir that this made her unpopular in the neighborhood. She described her life as "frugal and retiring", and that it was "necessary for me to labor incessantly".

== The school ==
In 1853 she paid a business visit to the barber shop of a free black man named Robinson. He was a man of influence in the community of more than 1500 free people of color who lived in Norfolk at that time. His two young sons were busy studying a reading primer, so Douglass asked Robinson if there was a school in town where free black children could learn to read. Robinson said that there was only the Sunday school at Christ Church where, he said, "they didn't learn much." Douglass returned home and asked her teenaged daughter, Hannah Rosa, if she would like to tutor the boys. Hannah Rosa said she would, and the boys began to receive free reading lessons at the Douglass home, using the books they received at church. Eventually, Robinson took his sons back to the barber shop where he needed their help, and sent his two daughters instead. In her memoir, Douglass states that the two girls were intelligent, attentive, made rapid progress, and were "a source of pleasure to us."

A month later, Margaret and Hannah Rosa decided to open a small school for free black children in their home, and charge three dollars per student per quarter. Robinson spread word to the free black community, and the school was deluged with applications. For 11 months, they taught 25 children, whom Douglass described as "well-behaved" and "anxious to be taught". When one of her female students grew ill, Douglass made regular visits to her home, and arranged for and participated in the girl's funeral when she died. This, according to Douglass, was not approved of by other whites in the community.

== Arrest ==
On the morning of May 9, 1853, while Hannah Rosa and the children were assembled at their desks, two police officers stationed themselves at the front and back door of her house. They informed Margaret and Hannah Rosa that teaching free black children was illegal under Virginia law, then took the two women and the twenty-five terrified children on foot to the mayor's office. This 1849 law, like similar ones throughout the South, was the result of Southern white panic following Nat Turner's Rebellion in 1831. Under this law, it was an 'unlawful assembly' for black people to gather together to learn to read and write, punishable by whipping, and for any white person to instruct them, punishable by up to 100 dollars and six months in jail.

"You have a very large family", Mayor Stubbs commented when she and the 25 children arrived at his office. He then asked her if she was aware of the law. Douglass responded that she didn't know teaching free black children was illegal, but that if it were illegal for her to teach the children it should also be illegal for the church to do it, since she was using the same books. The mayor dismissed the matter and sent everyone home, after assuring Douglass that nothing would happen to the black children or their families.

Outside the courtroom, Douglass noted that she was met by a group of free black adults, parents of the children and their friends, waiting to hear the decision and offering to pay for any penalties or bail she might incur. She gathered the children back at the school, gave them back their books and slates, and said goodbye. "It was a sad parting", she wrote in her memoir.

After her daughter Hannah Rosa left Norfolk for New York on June 29, Douglass was left alone, receiving however frequent gifts of flowers from her former students who stopped by to see her.

Of the outpouring of support she received from the black community. Douglass writes, "In my opinion, those who call the Southern Negroes ungrateful are only those who never do anything to call forth that emotion....May I ask what gratitude they owe to those who would degrade them? What gratitude does that child owe to his own father, who would coldly sell him as a slave?"

== Trial ==
Although she thought the case was now behind her, on July 13, she was served legal papers for a Grand Jury Indictment for her and her 17-year-old daughter, which stated: "Each of them did unlawfully assemble with diver negros, for the purpose of instructing them to read and to write, and did instruct them to read and to write, contrary to the act of the General Assembly, in such case made and provided, and against the peace and dignity of the Commonwealth of Virginia'.

Having little money and 'little affection for lawyers', Douglass decided to defend herself. She did not mention the upcoming trial to her daughter, who was still in New York, until September 1, when she instructed her to stay until further notice. On November 11, she entered the crowded courtroom alone, wearing a black velvet dress, white kid gloves and a plain straw bonnet. 'Everyone present seemed to be confused, except myself,' she noted.

She called three male members of Christ's Church as her witnesses, two of them also lawyers, one who had signed the summons against her. The excitement in the courtroom when these three witnesses arrived was 'most intense', she noted. In her memoir, she states that these men, who she describes as part of the 'aristocracy' of Norfolk, were either lecturers at the church's Sunday school, or had wives and daughters who were, and had given the free black children of the community the same books she was using to teach them to read. The witnesses either denied teaching altogether or said they had only provided moral and religious instruction, but did not teach the black children how to read and write.

In her closing speech to the jury, Douglass described herself as a Southern woman, a former slave-holder. She said she was not against slavery, and strongly opposed to northern abolitionist interference, though she believed their 'principles are based on a religious foundation'. She believed, she said, in 'the duty of every Southerner, morally and religiously to instruct his slaves, that they may know their duties to their masters and their common God. Let the masters first do their duty to them, for they are still our slaves and servants, whether bond or free, and can be nothing else in our community.' She also challenged the indifference of the white population towards the situation of the free and enslaved black population, where there was misery, starvation, and harsh laws in place to control them, noting that it was illegal for more than two or three of them to assemble in one place, for whatever reason.

'When they are sick, or in want, on whom does the duty devolve to seek them out and administer to their necessities? Does it fall upon you, gentlemen? Oh no, it is not expected that gentlemen will take the trouble to seek out a negro hut for the purpose of alleviating the wretchedness he may find within it. Why then persecute your benevolent ladies for doing that which you yourselves have so long neglected? Shall we treat our slaves with less compassion than we do the cattle in the field?"

She also told the jury that although they had nothing to fear from the 'true blooded' negroes, she felt that those who had 'white blood in their veins' were 'presumptuous, treacherous, and revengeful.' "Ask how that white blood got beneath those tawny skins," she suggested, "and let nature herself account for the exhibition of these instincts. Blame the authors of this devilish mischief, but not the victims of it."

In closing, she offered that she was willing to go to prison if she had to, but that the black anti-literacy law, she said, was 'one of the most inhuman and unjust laws that ever disgraced the statute book of a civilized community.'

When she rested her case, the judge asked if anyone wanted to speak in her favor. No one came forward.

Douglass successfully argued for dropping the charges against Hannah Rosa, since she was still a minor. At the close of the trial, the jury deliberated for two days, found her guilty, and fined her one dollar. She then left for New York to retrieve her daughter.

== Sentencing and jail ==
On January 10, 1854, she was called back before Judge Baker for further sentencing.

The Judge noted that some people in Norfolk were opposed to the law, and chided her for 'the indiscreet freedom with which you spoke of the colored race in general'. 'Such opinions I regard as manifestly mischievous', he said. The Church officials, he said, were allowed to instruct the children because religious instruction is necessary for black people. Black literacy, however, is dangerous. He described the law as a "matter of self-defense against Northern anti-slavery agitators who clog the mail with anti-slavery pamphlets to be distributed among Southern Negroes to induce them to cut our throats," and who "scattered pocket handkerchiefs around with anti-slavery engravings to work upon the feelings and ignorance of our negroes, who otherwise would remain comfortable and happy". He also admonished her for speaking directly and honestly in her own defense instead of hiring an attorney, which would have allowed her case to have been presented in a 'far more favorable light'. Her 'bold and open opposition', he said, 'is a matter not to be slightly regarded' and 'something more substantial is required in this case'.

'For these reasons', he continued, 'as an example to all others in like cases disposed to offend, and in vindication of the policy and justness of our laws, which every individual should be taught to respect, the judgment of the Court is, in addition to the proper fine and costs, that you be imprisoned for the period of one month in the jail of this city'.

Douglass served out her sentence. Having no where else to stay when she was released, the jailer and his wife put her up for two days before she moved with her daughter to Philadelphia.

== Media coverage ==
The case received substantial media coverage at the time, both for and against Douglass and the anti-literacy law. Under the headline "Her Own Lawyer," an editor in the Petersburg Daily Express wrote of how the courtroom was 'filled with persons anxious to witness the novel spectacle' of a woman defending herself and compared her speech making abilities to renowned feminists like Lucy Stone. Despite her disavowal of abolitionism, she was hailed as a heroine by abolitionists. William Lloyd Garrison, in his abolitionist newspaper, The Liberator, noted that a Quaker woman in Norfolk had delivered a sermon on Douglass' behalf while Douglass was in jail and stated, "The women are a great trouble to our Norfolk neighbors", he said. "If they want peace, they will have to expel all Christian women... from the city."

The editor of the Virginia newspaper The Argus wrote that although the Norfolk community was reluctant to put a white woman in prison, 'there rose a righteous indignation towards a person who would throw contempt in the face of our laws, and brave the imprisonment for 'the cause of humanity' '.

'Let her depart hence with only one wish, that her presence will never be intruded upon us again. Let her seek her associates at the North, and with them commingle, but let us put a check to such mischievous views as fell from her lips last November, sentiments unworthy of a resident of the State, and in direct rebellion against our Constitution", he wrote.

In the religious publication Covenanter: Devoted to the Principles of the Reformed Presbyterian Church, (Volume 9, 1853) David Smith called upon the Presbyterian General Assembly to intercede with the U.S. government to "secure for all its citizens the rights of teaching human beings to read the language of their country..." He noted that the United States government had interceded when Presbyterian women had been imprisoned in foreign Catholic countries for passing out Bibles, but would not intervene in Douglas's case.

The case, Smith said, has "exposed the country to the contempt and hissing of every civilized country on earth".

== Memoir and legacy ==
In 1854, Douglass published her memoir of the event, Educational Laws of Virginia: The Personal Narrative of Mrs. Margaret Douglass, a Southern Woman, who was Imprisoned for One Month in the Common Jail of Norfolk, Under the Laws of Virginia, for the Crime of Teaching Free Colored Children to Read. In it, she describes the trial as well as the events that led up to it, and includes the speech she made in her own self-defense. As she did in her courtroom speech, she criticizes the black literacy and assembly laws as well as white indifference to the situation of blacks, but identifies herself as a Southern supporter of slavery, and a white supremacist:

"I have been a slaveholder myself, and, if circumstances rendered it necessary or practicable, I might be such again".

Pointing out that many of the black and mixed race children she was teaching were the children of the same white men who aided in the prosecution against her, she lays some of the blame for the condition of black people on Southern white men who sexually abused enslaved black women. This, she believed, is the root of the anti-literacy law. "How important then for these Southern Sultans that the objects of their criminal passions should be kept in utter ignorance and degradation", she writes. She speaks of the silent frustration of white women who know of their husbands' 'tawny mistresses' and the powerlessness of black women, who have "parents, brothers, sisters, a lover perhaps, all of whom suffer through and with her, and in whose hearts spring up roots of bitterness which are destined to grow into trees whose branches will sooner or later overshadow the whole land." She ends her memoir calling upon her white "Southern sisters" to remedy this situation:

"I know my Southern sisters well enough to believe that they will not much longer rest tamely under the influence of this damning curse. I have told them plainly of the evil. The remedy is in their hands".

Little is known about Margaret Douglass's life after her trial.

In June 1865 the members of the free black community of Norfolk, Virginia petitioned the federal government to abolish the restrictive literacy and assembly laws that were still in place in their community. The law was abolished in 1867.

Documents and publications about Douglass's trial and her subsequent memoir have helped shed light on the era she lived in for scholars of American history, race relations, women's history, religion and law. One legal scholar wrote that with the case of Margaret Douglass: "The modern era of Anglo-American Law had arrived early, and the principal actor had been, appropriately, a woman. Her jury speech had, appropriately, employed the female metaphor of the family, in which all the children deserved equality of treatment. It was a metaphor, and an idea, that would come to dominate the legal discourse of America."
