= Theresa Maxis Duchemin =

American Catholic missionary (1810–1892)

Mother Theresa Maxis Duchemin IHM
- Foundress
- Church: Catholic Church

Personal details
- Born: Almeide Maxis Duchemin; April 8, 1810 Baltimore. Maryland
- Died: January 4, 1892 (aged 81) West Chester, Chester County, Pennsylvania, United States
- Buried: Immaculata Cemetery, Immaculata, Chester County, Pennsylvania, United States

Theresa Maxis Duchemin, IHM (born Almeide Maxis Duchemin, 1810–1892) was a Black Catholic missionary in Baltimore, Maryland. She was the first US-born African American to become a religious sister.

She helped found both the Oblate Sisters of Providence—the first order of Black nuns in the US—and the Sisters, Servants of the Immaculate Heart of Mary. The latter, founded in Monroe, Michigan, was the first predominantly White order founded by an African American. Duchemin served as one of the earliest Black mother superiors in the nation.

She opened multiple schools and orphanages in the Michigan and the Pennsylvania areas, and was inducted into the Michigan Women's Hall of Fame. But the IHM sisters, which she founded, did not fully acknowledge her until 1992.

== Biography ==
Duchemin was born in 1810 in Baltimore to immigrant parents from Saint-Domingue. They had fled the violent revolution by which Haiti achieved independence in 1794. After her father later left the family, Duchemin was raised by her mother alone.

At the age of nineteen, she was involved as a founding member of the Oblate Sisters of Providence, which was the first Roman Catholic religious institute begun for Catholic women of African descent. Her mother, who was also involved with the Oblate Sisters, died during the 1831 cholera epidemic in Baltimore.

Duchemin subsequently moved to Michigan, to work with Louis Florent Gillet. The two would found Servants of the Immaculate Heart of Mary. They also founded schools in Michigan and, in 1858, expanded into Pennsylvania.

Targeted by local bishops due to their racism and her Blackness, Duchemin was exiled multiple times.

She eventually settled with Grey Nuns of the Sacred Heart in Quebec, Canada, where she would spend much of the rest of her life. She did not return to Michigan until 1885.

She died in 1892.

== Historical suppression ==
Due to racism, the IHM sisters denied Duchemin's role in their order for 160 years. They likely contributed to Duchemin's inability to get her 1893 biography published.

According to journalist Dawn Araujo-Hawkins,

"[They] did not want to be associated with a black sister. It was "embarrassing" and "unpleasant," as sisters wrote in various letters. It would scare white people away from their ministries... before the 1980s, novices didn't even learn about Duchemin in formation... At one point, they even enlisted a cardinal to intervene in the publication of a book that might have outed them as having been co-founded by a black woman."

In 1992, an IHM sister, Margaret Gannon, published letters acknowledging Duchemin and her significance; this began a period of collaboration between the IHM and Oblate sisters. (The latter group had always acknowledged Duchemin as a founding member.) In addition, there was a more general acknowledgement of Duchemin within the IHM community.
