= Yumin zhengce =

Chinese political science concept

Chinese name
- Traditional Chinese: 愚民政策
Transcriptions
Standard Mandarin
- Hanyu Pinyin: yúmín zhèngcè
- Wade–Giles: yü-min cheng-tsʻe

Korean name
- Hangul: 우민정책
- Hanja: 愚民政策
Transcriptions
- Revised Romanization: umin jeongchaeg

Japanese name
- Kanji: 愚民政策
- Kana: ぐみんせいさく
Transcriptions
- Romanization: gumin seisaku

Yumin zhengce (Chinese: 愚民政策; pinyin: yúmín zhèngcè, lit. 'policy to keep the masses stupid') is a chengyu and concept in Chinese political philosophy.

== Summary ==
The term refers to the practice of a government deliberately keeping its population in a state of ignorance in order to make them more obedient to political authority and too incompetent to form effective rebellions against the state, thus rendering them more easily subjugated. A fundamental idea held is that by limiting the population's literacy their thoughts could be limited as well.

The systematization of yumin zhengce has been attributed to Shang Yang, a statesman of the State of Qin. The 3rd century BC Book of Lord Shang states that "[when] the masses are kept ignorant, they are thus [made] easy to control" (民愚則易治也).

== See also ==
- Censorship in China
- Burning of books and burying of scholars
- Anti-literacy laws in the United States
- 3S policy, policy applied during the occupation of Japan to infantilize the Japanese population
