= Mathilda Beasley =

African American teacher and Franciscan Sister (1832-1903)

Mother Mathilda Beasley OSF
- Mother Superior
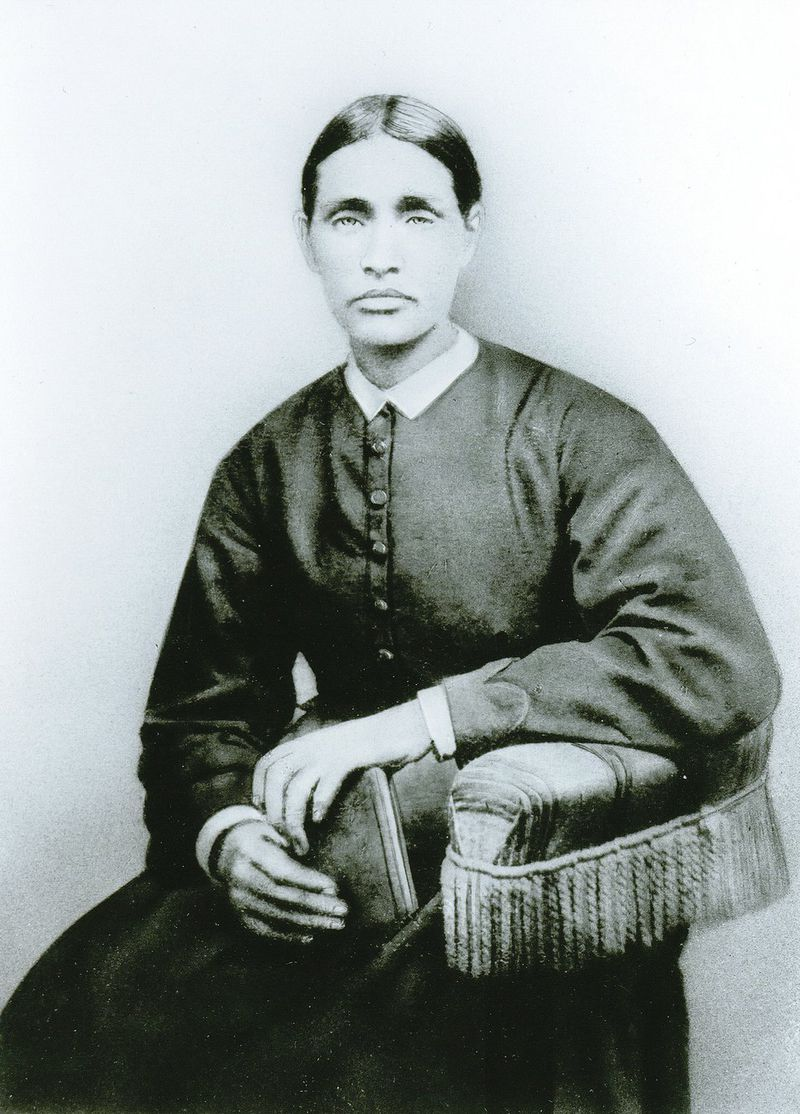
- Mother Mathilda Beasley, OSF, foundress of the first order of Black Catholic nuns in Savannah, Georgia.
- Church: Catholic Church

Personal details
- Born: Mathilda Taylor; November 14, 1832 New Orleans
- Died: December 20, 1903 (aged 71)
- Occupation: Foundress, caregiver

Mathilda Taylor Beasley, OSF (November 14, 1832 – December 20, 1903) was a Black Catholic educator and religious leader who was the first African American nun to serve in the state of Georgia. She founded a group of African-American nuns and one of the first U.S. orphanages for African-American girls.

In 2004, she was posthumously named a Georgia Woman of Achievement.

== Biography ==
She was born in New Orleans, Louisiana on November 14, 1832. She was baptized as a Catholic in 1869, possibly in preparation for her marriage to Abraham Beasley, a wealthy free black restaurant owner in Savannah, who died in 1877.

With Catherine and Jane Deveaux, Beasley educated slaves in her home in Savannah, Georgia before the Civil War although this was illegal at the time.

Later in life, after becoming a Franciscan nun in England, Beasley returned to the United States and founded a group of African-American sisters in Georgia, called the Sisters of the Third Order of St. Francis. Beasley attempted to affiliate her group with the Franciscan Order but was ultimately unsuccessful.

She also started one of the first orphanages in the United States for African-American girls, the St. Francis Home for Colored Orphans.

She died on December 20, 1903.

== Legacy ==
In 1982 the Mother Mathilda Beasley Park was dedicated in Savannah on a tract of land east of East Broad Street. A Georgia Historical Marker documenting her life was erected in 1988 at her home in Savannah. In 2014 her cottage, formerly located at 1511 Price Street, was relocated into Mother Mathilda Beasley Park as an interpretive center.

In 2004, Beasley was inducted into the Georgia Women of Achievement hall of fame.

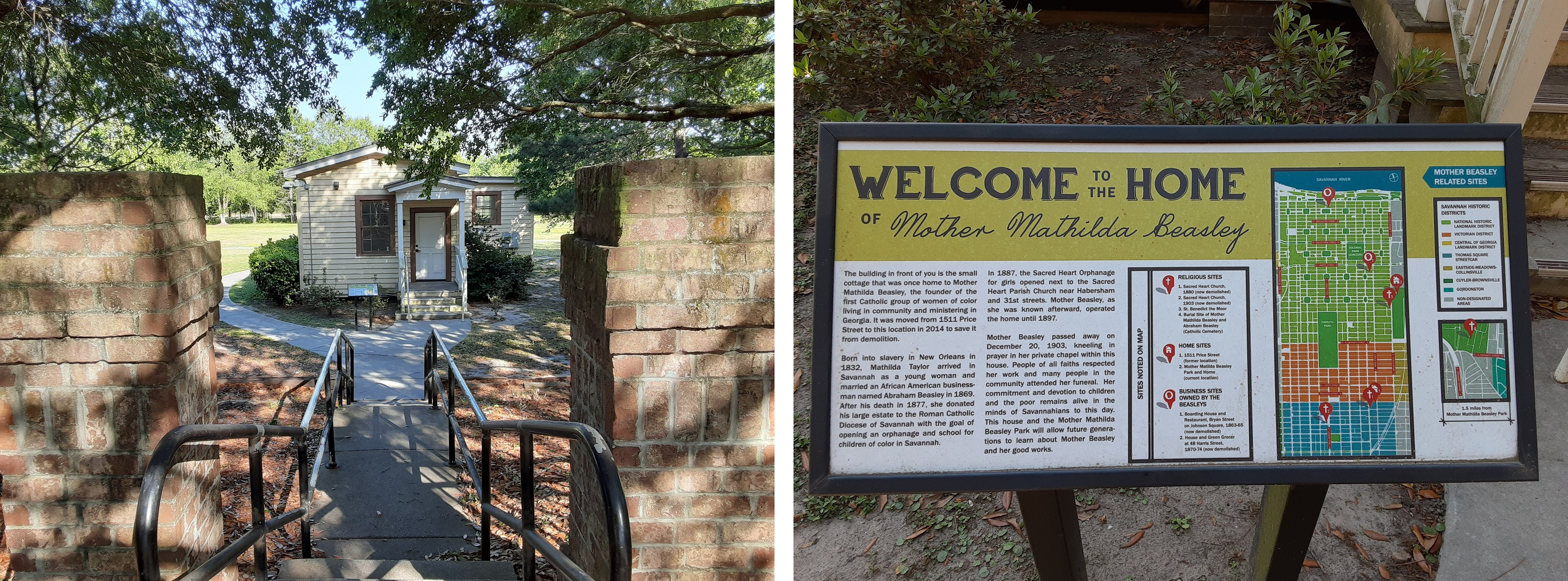
