= Mary Elizabeth Lange =

American religious sister (c.1789–1882)

Venerable Mary Elizabeth Lange OSP
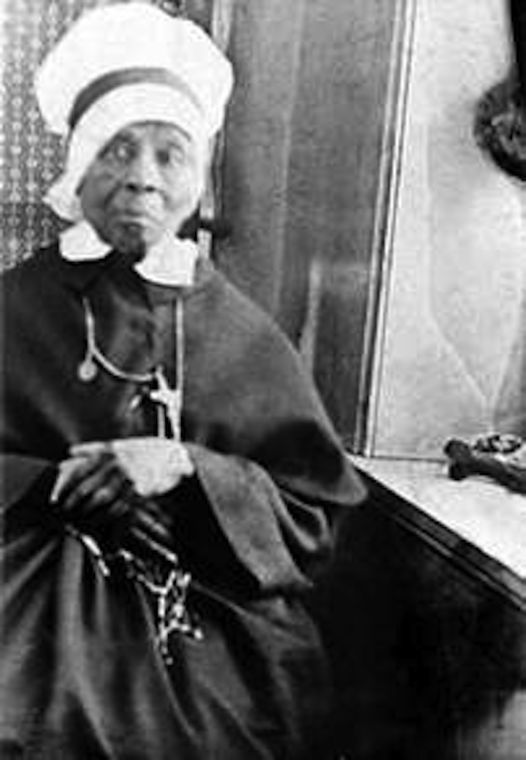
- Born: Elizabeth Clarisse Lange c. 1789; Santiago de Cuba
- Died: February 3, 1882 (aged 92–93); Baltimore, Maryland, United States

Mary Elizabeth Lange, OSP (born Elizabeth Clarisse Lange; c. 1789 – February 3, 1882) was an American religious sister in Baltimore, Maryland who founded the Oblate Sisters of Providence in 1829, the first African-American religious congregation in the United States. She was also the first African-American superior general. The cause for her beatification was opened in 1991. Pope Francis named her as venerable on June 22, 2023.

== Life ==
=== Early life ===
Lange was born in Santiago de Cuba about 1789. It is said that her mother, Annette Lange, was the daughter of a Jewish plantation owner and an enslaved African woman. Her father, Clovis, was said to be an enslaved mulatto man on the same plantation.

During the Haitian Revolution, her parents escaped and took the family to Cuba, settling in Santiago de Cuba. There Lange received an excellent education. She left Cuba in the early 1800s and immigrated to the United States.

According to oral tradition of the Oblate Sisters of Providence, Lange landed in Charleston, South Carolina. She traveled next to Norfolk, Virginia, and finally settled in Baltimore, Maryland by 1813. Baltimore had a large population of free people of color, who already outnumbered the city's enslaved population. Among the free people were numerous French-speaking Afro-Caribbean people who had also fled the revolution in Haiti.

In the early 1800s, various Protestant organizations in Baltimore, such as Sharp Street Methodist Episcopal Church's Free African School (1802), Daniel Coker's Bethel Charity School (c. 1812), St. James Protestant Episcopal Day School (1824), and William Lively's Union Seminary (1825), created schools for African-American students. While providing a valuable service, they could not meet the demands of Baltimore's growing free African-American population.

Lange recognized the need for education for African-American children and opened a school for them in her home in the Fells Point area of the city in 1818. Public education was not established for Black children in the city until 1866.

=== Foundress ===
In Baltimore, Lange met James Nicholas Joubert, a Sulpician priest who was a native of France and a former soldier. Joubert had also fled the slave rebellion in Saint-Domingue. He was in charge of teaching catechism to the African-American children who attended the Lower Chapel at Saint Mary's Seminary. He found they had difficulty learning the catechism because they could not read very well, and thought it would be good to start a school for girls.

After getting permission from the archbishop, he began looking for two women of color to serve as teachers. A friend suggested Lange and Marie Balas, since they were already operating a school in their home, which later became Saint Frances Academy. It is still operating in Baltimore.

Joubert also wanted to start a women's religious congregation to teach African-American children. He asked Lange and Balas if they would do so. They said they had felt called to consecrate their lives to God and had been waiting to be shown the way to serve. Joubert agreed to support the women and persuaded Archbishop James Whitfield to approve the new community. The Oblate Sisters of Providence were founded by Lange and Joubert as the first religious congregation of women of African descent in the United States. The order was established with the primary purpose of Catholic education for girls.

On July 2, 1829, Lange and three other women (Balas, Mary Rosine Boegues, and an older student, Almeide Theresa Duchemin) took their first vows.

Lange took the name of "Sister Mary" and was appointed as the first superior general of the new community. The sisters adopted a religious habit of a black dress and cape with a white cap. They started in a rented house with four sisters and twenty students. While dealing with poverty, racism, and hardships, the Oblate Sisters sought to evangelize the Black community through Catholic education. In addition to schools, the sisters later conducted night classes for women, vocational and career training, and established homes for widows and orphans.

By 1832, the community had grown to eleven members. That year a cholera outbreak hit the city. While the community as a whole volunteered to risk their lives in nursing the epidemic's victims, only four were chosen, Lange and three companions.

Sister Frances died in the mid-1840s. Lange took her place working as a domestic at St. Mary's Seminary in the city to help support her community. In 1850 she was also appointed to serve the congregation as Mistress of novices, a position in which she served for the next ten years.

Lange died on February 3, 1882, and was buried in the Cathedral Cemetery. Her remains were transferred to New Cathedral Cemetery on February 6, 1882.

== Legacy ==
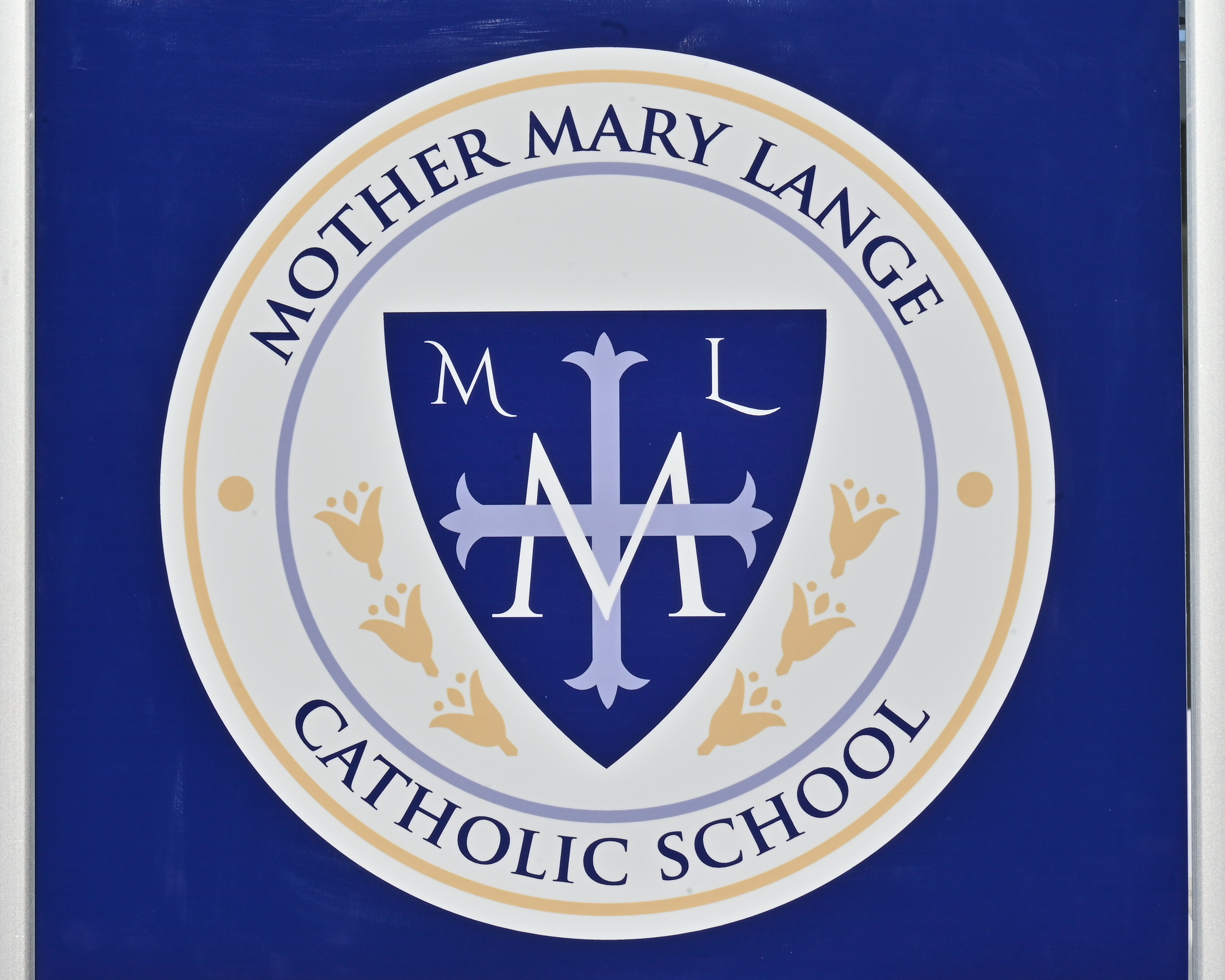
Mother Mary Lange Catholic School

Lange's legacy of the Oblate Sisters of Providence has thrived over the years in the United States and in several foreign countries.

Lange was inducted into the Maryland Women's Hall of Fame in 1991 for the St. Frances Academy which she founded.

In 2005, three Baltimore parochial schools (St. Dominic School, Shrine of the Little Flower, and St. Anthony of Padua) were combined into Mother Mary Lange Catholic School. This was the first school named after her in the United States. It has since closed.

In 2008, the community celebrated the 180th anniversary of St. Frances Academy.

In August 2021, a new Mother Mary Lange Catholic School was opened; it was first new Catholic school in Baltimore in nearly six decades. Alisha Jordan was the founding principal.

A three-part Spanish-language documentary, Hermanas de Corazon (2021), created by Gloria Rolando, was made about Lange and the Oblates' work in Cuba.

=== Beatification process ===
After Lange's death, many Catholics in Baltimore began to venerate her. In 1991, with the approval of the Holy See, Cardinal William Henry Keeler, Archbishop of Baltimore, opened a formal investigation of Lange's life to study it for her possible beatification. She was titled Servant of God, and her remains were exhumed and examined. In 2004, documents describing Lange's life were sent to the Vatican's Congregation for the Causes of Saints.

On May 28, 2013, Lange's remains were exhumed and transferred to the Baltimore community of the Oblate Sisters, where she was reinterred in their chapel.

In 2023, the Holy See approved the positio. Lange was declared venerable by Pope Francis on June 22, 2023. The postulator of the cause is Waldery Hilgeman.
