= Oblate Sisters of Providence =

Female Black Catholic religious congregation

- Abbreviation: OSP
- Formation: 2 July 1829; 196 years ago
- Founder: Mother Mary Lange
- Founded at: Baltimore
- Type: Catholic religious order
- Superior General: Sister Rita Michelle Proctor, OSP
- Affiliations: Catholic Church
- Website: oblatesisters.com

The Oblate Sisters of Providence (OSP) is a Catholic women's religious institute founded by Mother Mary Elizabeth Lange, and Father James Nicholas Joubert in 1829 in Baltimore, Maryland for the education of girls of African descent. It was the first permanent community of Black Catholic sisters in the United States.

The Oblate Sisters were free women of color who served to provide Baltimore's African-American population with education and "a corps of teachers from its own ranks." The congregation is a member of the Women of Providence in Collaboration.

== History ==
=== Founding ===
James Nicholas Joubert was born in France, and working in Saint-Domingue (Haiti). During the violence of the Revolution, he fled as a refugee to the United States. Arriving in Baltimore, he entered St. Mary's Seminary to become a Sulpician priest.

After his ordination, Father Joubert was given charge of the black French-speaking Catholics of St. Mary's chapel, who were primarily also from Saint-Domingue. Finding he was making no headway, as the children were having trouble reading and learning their catechism, he decided to found a school to educate these children in French. He was encouraged by his two friends, Fathers Babade and Tessier.

He was introduced to two women of color who kept a small private school and had a hope of consecrating their lives to God. Joubert told them about his plans for a school for girls of African descent, and they offered to join his project. Joubert proposed that they form a religious institute in addition to conducting a school. The school, St. Frances Academy, was founded in 1828.

With the approval of James Whitfield, Archbishop of Baltimore, a novitiate was begun. Three of the four sisters were French speakers from Saint-Domingue (Haiti, after 1804). A little over a year later, on 2 July 1829, the first four sisters, Mary Elizabeth Lange from Santiago, Cuba (she was born in Saint-Domingue); Mary Rosine Boegues of Saint Domingue (Haiti); Magdelaine Frances Balas of Saint Domingue (Haiti); and Theresa Maxis Duchemin of Baltimore, made their vows.

Mary Lange was chosen as superior, and Father Joubert was appointed director. Pope Gregory XVI approved the institute on 2 October 1831 under the title of Oblate Sisters of Providence. The sisters opened other Catholic schools for African-American girls in the city, in addition to teaching adult women in evening classes, and opening a home for widows. They also expanded the school from classes in French to including English.

During the cholera epidemic of 1832, the sisters nursed the terminally ill. They provided a home for orphans and sheltered the elderly. The sisters took in washing, ironing and mending to care for the "children of the house". The organization did not consider "previous condition of servitude a liability for Oblate membership". Eight of the forty women who joined the order in the antebellum years (1828–1860) had formerly been enslaved.

=== Expansion ===
In 1871 the sisters vacated the motherhouse on Richmond Street because the city needed the property. A new location was found on a knoll on what was then the outskirts of the city, and a new motherhouse was built on Chase Street. The sisters continued to operate an orphanage, and a day and boarding school within the convent walls.

In 1900 the Oblates opened their first foreign mission, in Havana, Cuba. The OSPs established seven missions in Cuba but left in 1961 when the regime of Fidel Castro made it impossible for them to continue their work.

In 1903 they opened a convent and school on Old Providence Island in the western Caribbean. Due to extremely harsh conditions, the mission closed after fifteen months.

By 1910 the sisters conducted schools and orphanages at Baltimore, Washington state, Leavenworth, Kansas, and St. Louis and Normandy, Missouri. Eventually the institute founded schools in eighteen states. Some missions lasted only a few years while others endured and changed with the needs of the community.

==== Modern era ====
By the 1950s more than 300 Oblate Sisters of Providence were teaching and caring for African-American children. The Oblates had missions in the Dominican Republic. They also opened missions in Costa Rica in 1964, where they continue today.

The motherhouse remained on Chase Street in Baltimore until a new motherhouse was built in 1961 at 701 Gun Road in southwest Baltimore County. It is called Our Lady of Mount Providence and remains the motherhouse today. Several missions were based on the motherhouse property. These included Mt. Providence Junior College, which operated from 1963 to 1966.

In 1972 the sisters started a Child Development Center and Reading and Math Center on the motherhouse property. The sisters continue to operate St. Frances Academy on Chase Street in Baltimore.

==== Bill and Camille Cosby donations ====
In 2005, Camille Cosby (wife of Bill Cosby), an alumna of a school in Washington run by the Oblates, made a donation to the St Frances Academy to create an endowment to pay the tuition of 16 students a year.

The Cosbys made another donation in 2012 to assist St. Frances Academy in building a community center in East Baltimore. The community center was originally named after both Camille and her husband, but his name was removed after the revelation of multiple sexual offenses by him.

== Charism ==
"The original inspiration of the Oblate Sisters of Providence is that gift of the Spirit so evident in the life of Mother Mary Lange. This charism enables us, with total trust in God's Providence, to bring joy, healing and the liberating, redemptive love of the suffering Jesus to the victims of poverty, racism, and injustice despite contradictions, prejudice and pain."

In the early 21st century, the institute has approximately eighty members. The Oblate Sisters continue in Baltimore, Maryland; Miami, Florida; Buffalo, New York; and Alajuela and Siquirres, Costa Rica.

== Motherhouse ==
The motherhouse contains the administrative offices, a health care unit, a novitiate (there is also a novitiate in Costa Rica), the Mother Lange Guild (supporting the cause for canonization of Mother Lange), and the Oblate Sisters of Providence Archives and Special Collections Library.

Offices for the affiliated organizations of the National Oblate Sisters of Providence Alumni Association and Cojourners of the Oblate Sisters of Providence are also located at the Motherhouse.

== See also ==
- Oblate (religion)
