= Women as theological figures =

Women as theological figures have played a significant role in the development of various religions and religious hierarchies.

Throughout most of history women were unofficial theologians. They would write and teach, but did not hold official positions in Universities and Seminaries. Beginning in the second half of the twentieth century, women theological scholars began to be appointed to formal faculty positions at theological schools. Women are slowly being recognized as theological scholars.

George Gallup Jr. wrote in 2002 that studies show women have more religiosity than men. Gallup goes on to say that women hold on to their faith more heartily, work harder for the church, and in general practice with more consistency than men.

== Women theological scholars ==
- Catherine L. Albanese, American religious studies scholar, professor, lecturer, and author
- Delores S. Williams, American Presbyterian theologian notable for her formative role in the development of womanist theology
- Emilie Townes, American Christian social ethicist and theologian
- Elisabeth Schüssler Fiorenza, Romanian-born German Roman Catholic feminist theologian
- Elizabeth Schrader Polczer, American biblical scholar who concentrates on textual studies concerning Mary Magdalene, the Gospel of John, and the Nag Hammadi corpus
- Esther Mombo, is a Kenyan female theologian who researches church history with a focus on mission history, interfaith relations and theology, and gender studies with a focus on African women's theologies, sexuality, and HIV/AIDS.
- Hannah Kinoti, Kenyan-African feminist theologian, Ethicist, and Religious studies scholar, Member of the Circle of Concerned African Women Theologians.
- Jacquelyn Grant, American theologian and Methodist minister who is one of the founding developers of womanist theology
- Jamie T. Phelps, American Catholic theologian known for her contributions to womanist theology
- Joanna Macy, environmental activist, author, and scholar of Buddhism
- Joan E. Taylor, English historian of the Bible and early Christianity with special expertise in archaeology, and women's and gender studies.
- Karen Armstrong, British author known for her books on comparative religion
- Katie Cannon, American Christian theologian and ethicist associated with womanist theology and black theology
- Kelly Brown Douglas, African-American Episcopal priest, womanist theologian, and academic
- Letty M. Russell, American Christian feminist theologian who pioneered feminist ecclesiology
- Lydia Mwaniki, Kenyan post-colonial feminist theologian, ordained Anglican priest, advocate for gender justice, and author.
- Marta Benavides, El Salvadorian feminist religious leader
- Mary Getui, Kenyan theologian, founding member of the Circle of Concerned African Women Theologians, and professor of Religious studies.
- Mercy Amba Oduyoye, Ghanaian theologian and founder of the Circle of Concerned African Women Theologians
- Monica Coleman, theologian associated with process theology and womanist theology
- Muriel Orevillo-Montenegro, Filipina theologian known for her writings in Asian feminist theology
- Musa Dube, a Motswana feminist theologian and Professor of New Testament
- M. Shawn Copeland, American womanist and Black Catholic theologian
- Nyambura Njoroge, Kenyan feminist theologian and ecumenical leader.
- Nyasha Junior, American biblical scholar focusing on the connections between religion, race, and gender within the Hebrew Bible
- Philomena Njeri Mwaura, is a Kenyan feminist theologian whose scholarship spans African Christianity, theological curriculum development, religion and gender, new religious movements, and Pentecostal-charismatic movements in Africa.
- Renita J. Weems, ordained minister, a Hebrew Bible scholar, and an author
- Rosemary Edet, Catholic nun, feminist theologian, co-founder of the Circle, and author.
- Rosemary Radford Reuther, American feminist theologian who helped define fields of Christian feminist and eco-feminist theology
- Sallie McFague, American feminist theologian, who emphasized God as mother in her theology
- Traci D. Blackmon, minister and spiritual leader involved in peaceful protests during unrest in Ferguson, Missouri in 2014
- Wilda C. Gafney, American biblical scholar and Episcopal priest

== Baháʼí Faith ==
In writings of the Baháʼí Faith, the Holy Spirit is often described as the "Maid of Heaven".

Three women figure prominently in the history of the Baháʼí Faith: Táhirih, a disciple of the Báb; Ásíyih Khánum, the wife of Baháʼu'lláh; and Bahíyyih Khánum the daughter of Baháʼu'lláh. Táhirih and Bahíyyih, in particular, held strong leadership positions and are seen vital to the development of the religion.

Several women played leading roles in the early days of the Baháʼí Faith in America. Among them are: May Maxwell, Corinne True, and Martha Root. Rúhíyyih Khanum and a mix of male and female Hands of the Cause formed an interim leadership of the religion for six years prior to the formation of the Universal House of Justice. Later prominent women include Patricia Locke, Jacqueline Left Hand Bull Delahunt, Layli Miller-Muro, and Dr. Susan Maneck, who herself wrote books documenting the role of women in the Baháʼí Faith.

== Buddhism ==
- Khema and Uppalavanna, the two chief female disciples of the Buddha
- Kisa Gotami
- Machig Labdrön, founder of the Tibetan practice of Chöd
- Maha Pajapati Gotami
- Pema Chodron, fully ordained Buddhist nun in the Tibetan Shambhala lineage.
- Ani Tenzin Palmo, nun in the Drukpa Kagyu lineage and founder of Dongyu Gatsal Ling Nunnery in Himachal Pradesh, India
- Yeshe Tsogyal, Tibetan consort and disciple of the Padmasambhava
- Chandra Khonnokyoong, a Thai mae chi (nun) and meditation teacher

== Christianity ==
=== In the New Testament ===
- Mary, mother of Jesus
- Mary Magdalene, one of Jesus' closest followers
- Lydia and Phoebe
- Mary of Bethany, sister of Lazarus and disciple of Jesus (sometimes misidentified with Mary Magdalene)
- Priscilla, teacher with her husband Aquila, partner with Apostle Paul
- Junia, female apostle of New Testament

=== In the Early Christian Church ===
- Thecla, disciple of Paul
- Perpetua and Felicity, martyrs
- Monica of Hippo
- Macrina the Younger
- Radegund (520–587), Frankish queen, ordained as a deaconess, established a convent
- Clotilde
- Hilda of Whitby, royal abbess in the 7th century
- Irene of Athens (c. 752–803), Empress who convened the 7th ecumenical council
- Kassia, 9th-century Eastern Orthodox nun, poet and hymnographer; sometimes referred to as St. Kassiani

=== In the Medieval church ===
- Antoinette Bourignon, a mystic
- Bridget of Sweden (1302–1373)
- Heloise (student of Abelard)
- Hildegard of Bingen, theologian, mystic, wrote much music, some which has survived
- Pope Joan, although existence has been questioned
- Margery Kempe (c.1373–1438)
- Macrina the Younger, sister and influence upon Basil the Great and Gregory of Nyssa
- Clare of Assisi, founded the Poor Clares
- Julian of Norwich (1342–c.1416), a mystic
- Scholastica, twin sister of Benedict of Nursia

=== In the Catholic Church (Post-Reformation) ===
- Mme Guyon, influential in Quietism
- Mother Cabrini, missionary to New York and first canonized US citizen
- Mother Teresa, founder of the Missionaries of Charity in India
- Elizabeth Ann Seton, founded the Sisters of Charity
- Faustina Kowalska, promoted devotion to Divine Mercy
- Katharine Drexel, founded the Sisters of the Blessed Sacrament, which performed charitable works for Native Americans and African Americans
- Rose Philippine Duchesne, co-founder of the Society of the Sacred Heart

In 1970 three women were declared Doctor of the Church

- Catherine of Siena
- Teresa of Avila
- Thérèse of Lisieux

=== In Protestant churches ===
- Ursula Cotta (article in German) (c. 1450–1511), influenced Luther's attitude toward women
- Inger Ottesdotter Rømer (c. 1475–1555), wealthiest landowner in Norway, promoted the Reformation extensively
- Argula von Grumbach (1492-1554), writer who defended Martin Luther
- Christina Gyllenstierna (1494-1559), commanded the city of Stockholm, unsuccessful in preventing the execution of over 100 people for heresy (Stockholm Bloodbath)
- Katharina Zell (1497 or 1498–1562), proponent of clerical marriage
- Katharina von Bora, (1499–1552) Roman Catholic nun who became Lutheran, proponent of clerical marriage
- Ursula of Munsterberg in 1528 published 69 articles about why she and other nuns were going to leave their convent.
- Anne Boleyn, influenced religious development in England indirectly by leading Henry VIII to divorce Catherine of Aragon and break from the Catholic Church
- Elisabeth of Hesse (1502–1557), exposed secret bigamy of her brother Philip
- Elisabeth of Brandenburg (1510-1558), secretly took communion in both kinds against the wishes of her Catholic father. She implemented the Reformation when governing in place of her underage son
- Amalia of Cleves (1517-1586), authored a songbook, rejected as possible wife by Henry VIII
- Anne Askew (1521–1546), tortured in the Tower of London and martyred in Smithfield for Protestantism
- Joan Bocher (?–1550), English Anabaptist martyr in Smithfield
- Elizabeth Pepper (?–1556), martyred while pregnant for Protestantism, together with Agnes George
- Guernsey Martyrs, three women martyred for Protestantism in 1556, one woman was pregnant and gave birth while being burned, the child was rescued but then ordered to be burned too
- Ann Lee, Shaker, founder of Shaker movement in America
- Anne Locke (1530 – ?), Calvinist poet
- Anna Leuhusen (died c. 1554), abbess who along with her nuns, became nurses
- Joan Waste (1534–1556), blind woman martyred for Protestantism
- Alice Benden (?–1557), martyred for Protestantism
- Alice Driver (?–1558), testified for and martyred for Protestantism
- Anna Maria of the Palatinate (1561 – 1589), a Lutheran who was concerned about the spread of Calvinism and described by Charles IX of Sweden as "more educated in religion than anyone to be found."
- Magdalena Heymair, in 1569 became the first woman to have her writings listed on the Index Librorum Prohibitorum
- Elizabeth Melville (c.1578–c.1640), Scottish Calvinist poet, first known woman to print a book in Scotland.
- Augusta of Denmark (1580 – 1639), walked to Lutheran church and refused to attend Calvinist services. Later fired a Calvinist minister and restored the previous Lutheran minister to his position.
- Anna Maria von Eggenberg (1609-1680), moved court to a city in Hungary where she would be able sponsor Protestant church services.
- Catherine Vasa of Sweden (1539-1610) actively supported Lutheranism above Calvinism, visited Wittenberg to study theology, wrote interpretations of the bible
- Johanna Eleonora Petersen (1644-1724), Pietist writer
- Anne Hutchinson, charismatic and outspoken Puritan in early colonial New England whose unorthodox religious views helped spark the Antinomian Controversy from 1636 to 1638
- Johanna Sibylla Küsel (1650 – 1717), Lutheran printmaker who illustrated religious and scientific books.
- Mary Dyer, avid follower of the Quaker religion who became a martyr when she was hanged in Boston in 1660 for her religious activism
- Katharina Elizabeth – in 1698, Catholic village leaders of Radibor attempted to have her disciplined for attempted Lutheranization of the population.
- Marie Durand (1711–1776), imprisoned 38 years in the Tower of Constance for Protestantism with 24 other women
- Barbara von Krüdener (1764–1824), her spiritual relationship with Tsar Alexander influenced the religious character of the Holy Alliance, for a time she gave up her noble lifestyle and wandered, supporting crowds who wandered with her.
- Amalie Sieveking (1794 –1859), founded society which trained women to help for poor and invalids, wrote tracts
- Clara Maass (1876–1901), devout nurse who died after volunteering in an immunization experiment, listed on the Lutheran Calendar of Saints
- Ellen G. White (1827-1915), co-founder and prophetess of the Seventh-day Adventist Church, a large Protestant movement present in over 200 countries and territories.
- Lottie Moon (1840–1912), Baptist missionary to China
- Mary Hannah Fulton (1854–1927), Presbyterian missionary to China
- Mary Stallard Purnell (1862–1953), co-founder of the Israelite House of David and founder of Mary's City of David
- Eva von Tiele-Winckler (1866-1930), (article in German), deaconess
- Elisabeth Schmitz (1893-1977), unsuccessfully attempted to prod the Confessing Church to take a stance in favor of Jews during the Nazi era.
- Gertrud Staewen (1894-1987), supported the cause of Jews in the Confessing Church during the Nazi era. Wikilink in German.
- Betty Stam (1906–1934), missionary to China, martyr
- Rachel Saint (1914–1994), missionary to the Huaorani in Operation Auca after the martyrdom of her brother

=== In Eastern Orthodoxy ===
- Catherine the Great, Russian Orthodox from 1744 to 1796, had been Lutheran from 1729 to 1744, nationalised all church lands, issued 1773 "Toleration of All Faiths" edict
- Matrona Nikonova
- Euphrosyne of Polotsk
- Olga of Kiev
- Xenia of Saint Petersburg
- Fevronia, described in The Tale of Peter and Fevronia
- Anna of Kashin
- Juliana of Lazarevo
- Princess Elisabeth of Hesse and by Rhine
- Barbara Skvorchikhinskaya (article in Russian)
- Eudoxia of Moscow
- Juliana, Princess of Vyazma (article in Russian)
- Frederica Mathewes-Green, (b. 1952) wife of priest and theological speaker

=== In the Latter Day Saint movement ===
- Emma Smith first wife of Joseph Smith and first General President of the Relief Society
- Inez Knight Allen one of the first single women to be a missionary in the Church of Jesus Christ of Latter-day Saints
- Eliza R. Snow second president of the Relief Society and renowned poet
- Amanda Barnes Smith helped organize the Relief Society and Sunday School in Salt Lake City
- Mary Elizabeth Rollins Lightner saved papers of the Book of Commandments from a mob, later published as the Doctrine & Covenants
- Sariah wife of Lehi and mother of Nephi in the Book of Mormon

=== Hymnodists ===
A number of hymns and psalms have been written by women, from the pen of Fanny Crosby and Emily Gosse, for example.

- Elisabeth Cruciger (1500-1535), the first female Protestant hymn writer
- Louise Henriette of Nassau (1627–1667), Calvinist hymnwriter, wrote "Jesus, meine Zuversicht".
- Emilie Juliane of Barby-Mühlingen (1637–1706), Lutheran hymnwriter, wrote nearly 600 hymns, including "Wer weiß, wie nahe mir mein Ende," which has been translated into English as "Who Knows When Death May Overtake Me."
- Anna Sophia II (1638–1683), wrote "Rede, liebster Jesu, rede," which was translated as "Speak, O Lord, Thy Servant Heareth."
- Ludmilla Elisabeth (1640–1672), her hymn "Jesus, Jesus, nichts als Jesu" was translated as "Jesus, Jesus, Only Jesus".
- Anna Laetitia Barbauld (1743–1825), authored Hymns in Prose for Children
- Aimee Semple McPherson ("Sister Aimee"), early 20th-century evangelist and founder of the Foursquare Church
- Jane Wardley, contributed to the development of the Shakers
- Catherine Booth, co-founder of the Salvation Army
- Elizabeth Fry, Quaker and prison reformer
- Princess Eugénie (1830–1889), her hymn "O, at jeg kunde min Jesus prise" is set to a Norwegian folk tune and was translated as "My heart is longing."
- Lina Sandell (1832–1903), Swedish hymn writer, wrote Tryggare kan ingen vara
- Ellen G. White, co-founder and prophetess of the Seventh-day Adventist Church
- Evangeline Booth, fourth General of the Salvation Army
- Elizabeth Barrett Browning (1806–1861), English hymn writer and literary figure
- Hannah Whitall Smith, prominent leader in the Holiness movement
- Joanna Southcott, 18th-century self-described religious prophetess and founder of Southcottians
- Li Tim-Oi, first female priest to be ordained in the Anglican Communion
- Louisa Maria Hubbard (1836–1906), involved in the deaconess movement; published in 1871 the pamphlet "Anglican Deaconesses: is there No Place for Women in the System?"
- Mother Ann Lee, leader of the Shakers in America
- Phoebe Palmer, prominent leader in the Holiness movement
- Selina, Countess of Huntingdon, involved with Methodism; there was a group called the Countess of Huntingdon's Connection
- Mary Baker Eddy, founded Christian Science
- Jackie Pullinger MBE, contemporary missionary working with inner city gangs, and founder of St Stephen's Society in Hong Kong
- Florence Crawford ("Mother Crawford"), founder of the Apostolic Faith Mission of Portland, Oregon
- Catherine Winkworth (1827–1878), Translator of German chorales
- Eliza Sibbald Alderson, English poet and hymn writer
- Sarah Bache, English hymn writer
- Charlotte Alington Barnard, English poet and composer
- Sarah Doudney, English fiction writer and poet
- Charlotte Elliott, English poet, hymn writer, and editor
- Ada R. Habershon, English Christian hymnist
- Katherine Hankey, English missionary and nurse who is best known for being the author of the poem The Old, Old Story
- Frances Ridley Havergal, English religious poet and hymnwriter
- Maria Grace Saffery, English Baptist poet and hymn-writer
- Anne Steele, English Baptist hymn writer and essayist
- Emily Taylor, English schoolmistress, poet, children's writer, and hymnist
- Emily H. Woodmansee, English-born American Mormon poet and hymnwriter
- Anna White, Shaker Eldress, social reformer, author, and hymn writer

== Hinduism ==
Recognition of the feminine aspect of God during the last century by Tantric and Shakti religious leaders, has led to the legitimization of the female teachers and female gurus in Hinduism. A notable example was Ramakrishna, who worshiped his wife as the embodiment of the divine feminine.

=== Deities ===
- Lakshmi
- Kali

=== Saints ===
- Karaikkal Ammaiyar
- Pravrajika Shraddhaprana

==== Poet Saints ====
- Meerabai (16th century), poet, saint, devotee of Krishna
- Gangasati
- Kanhopatra
- Avvaiyar
- Akka Mahadevi
- Andal
- Lal Ded

=== Gurus ===
- Gurumayi Chidvilasananda, teacher in the lineage of teachers of Siddha Yoga
- Mother Meera, referred to as a "female guru" by author Karen Pechilis
- Anandamayi Ma (1896-1982), saint, guru
- Mata Amritanandamayi
- Bhairavi Brahmani

=== Upanishads ===
- Gārgī Vāchaknavī

=== Hindu Epics ===
- Sulabha

== Islam ==
- Aisha bint Talha, scholar
- A'isha, wife of Muhammad and the narrator of the largest number of hadith
- Maryam, mother of Isa (Jesus)
- Amara bin Al-Rahman, exemplary woman jurist
- Amina bint Wahb, mother of Muhammad
- Asma bint Abu Bakr, narrator of Hadith
- Asiya, wife of the Pharaoh, foster mother of Moses
- Bilqis, Queen of Sheba
- Fatima Zahra, youngest daughter of Muhammad and Khadijah
- Fatimah bint Qays, scholar
- Hajirah (Hagar), wife of Abraham and mother of Ishmael; a central figure in the discovery of the Zamzam Well and foundation of Mecca
- Hind bint Utba, sahabah
- Khadijah, first convert to Islam, first wife of Muhammad
- Khawla bint al-Azwar, warrior and sahabah
- Al-Khansa', sahabah and poetess
- Nusaibah bint Ka'b al-Ansariyah, warrior
- Rabi'a al-'Adawiyya (Rabia Basri), important figure in the development of Sufism
- Sarah, wife of Prophet Ibrahim (Abraham)
- Sayyida Nafisa, scholar
- Sayyida al Hurra, scholar and warrior; founding figure in the history of the Barbary Corsairs
- Sumayyah bint Khabbab, first martyr of Islam
- Ukhtul Mazni, highly placed scholar of Islamic jurisprudence
- Umm Ad Darda, theologian
- Umm al-Darda, jurist and companion of Muhammad
- Umm 'Atiyyah, scholar of Islamic jurisprudence
- Umm Salamah, narrator of Hadith
- Umm Sulaym, scholar
- Umrah Bint Abdu Rahman, theologian and scholar
- Yochebed, mother of Musa (Moses)

== Jainism ==
The status of women in Jainism differs between the two main sects, Digambara and Śvetāmbara. Jainism prohibits women from appearing naked; because of this, Digambaras, who consider renunciation of clothes essential to moksha, say that they cannot attain enlightenment in the same life. Śvetāmbara, who allow sadhus to wear clothes, believe that women can attain moksha. There are more Śvetāmbara sadhvis than sadhus and women have always been influential in the Jain religion.

- Mallinath, the 19th Tirthankara; she was female according to Śvetāmbara (but male according to Digambaras)
- Marudevi, mother of Rishabha
- Trishala, mother of Mahavira

== Judaism ==
There are several prominent women in the Tanakh.

- Eve, the first woman, mother of all life
- Sarah, biblical matriarch, prophetess, and miracle worker
- Rebecca, biblical matriarch and miracle worker
- Rachel, matriarch of some of the twelve tribes
- Leah, beloved of God, matriarch of some of the twelve tribes
- Dinah, daughter of Jacob and Leah, who when violated by Shechem, her brothers slayed the people of Shechem in an act of revenge
- Miriam, prophetess who the Tanakh describes as having delivered the Israelites from exile in Egypt, alongside Moses and Aaron
- Jochebed, mother of Moses and woman of faith
- Deborah, Hebrew prophetess, fourth judge of the Israelites
- Ruth, proselyte par excellence; better than seven sons
- Bathsheba, queen and later queen mother of the United Monarchy of Israel and Judea
- Hannah, prophetess
- Abigail, prophetess and queen of the United Monarchy of Israel and Judea
- Esther, Jewish heroine queen associated with the festival of Purim; she is also listed as one of the Prophets in Judaism
- Huldah, the prophetess who validated the scroll found in the Temple (thought by many to be the book of Deuteronomy)
- Yael, the heroine who killed Sisera, the Canaanite army commander, in order to deliver the Israelites from the troops of King Jabin
- Judith, a Jewish widow who killed an Assyrian general and saved her people from oppression
- Salome Alexandra, the last regnant queen of Judea, and the final ruler of Judea to die as the sovereign ruler of an independent kingdom
- Athaliah, queen regnant of Judah
- Michal, princess of the United Kingdom of Israel and Judah
- Rahab, who assisted the Israelites in capturing Ancient Jericho by hiding two men who had been sent to scout the city prior to their attack

== Sikhism ==
- Bibi Bhani
- Bibi Nanaki
- Mai Bhago
- Mata Gujri
- Mata Jitoji
- Mata Khivi
- Mata Sahib Kaur
- Mata Sundri

== Daoism ==
One of the Daoist Eight Immortals, Immortal Woman He, is a woman. Additionally, Sun Bu'er was a famous female Taoist master in the 12th century. Her work "Secret Book on the Inner Elixir (as Transmitted by the Immortal Sun Bu'er)" discussed some of the particularities of female "Inner Elixir" (Neidan) cultivation. Daoist nuns usually have equal status with monks.

- Wei Huacun, a founder of the Shangqing School

== Other religions ==
- Annie Besant, Theosophist influential in the Indian Independence Movement
- Madame Blavatsky, contributed to the development and promotion of theosophy
- Mary Ann MacLean, co-founder and leader of The Process Church of the Final Judgment
- Nakayama Miki, founder of Tenrikyo
- Nirmala Srivastava, founder and self-proclaimed goddess of Sahaja Yoga
- Dorothea Viale, Professor of Religion, California Polytechnichal Institutue University, California State, Founder, Conference on Current Pagan Studies

== Spiritual mediums ==
- Helen Schucman, claimed to have scribed A Course in Miracles
- Jane Roberts, claimed to have channeled Seth
- Judy Z. Knight (born Judith Darlene Hampton), claims to have channeled Ramtha
- Alice Auma, of the Holy Spirit Movement

== See also ==
- Feminist theology
- Gender and religion
- Goddess
- Goddess movement
- Blu Greenberg
- Islamic feminism
- Jewish feminism
- Jewish Orthodox Feminist Alliance
- List of female mystics
- Nuns
- Ordination of women
- Sacred prostitution
- Vestal Virgin
- When God Was a Woman
- Women as imams
- Women in Christianity
- Women in Islam
- Women in Judaism

== Bibliography ==
- Joan Breton Connelly Portrait of a Priestess: Women and Ritual in Ancient Greece Princeton University Press March 2007
- Silvia Evangelisti Nuns: A History of Convent Life, OUP 2007
- Pechilis, Karen. The Graceful Guru: Hindu Female Gurus in India and the United States ISBN 0-19-514538-0
- Shattuck, Cybelle and Lewis, Nancy D. The Pocket Idiot's Guide to Hinduism (2002). ISBN 0-02-864482-4
- http://www.rhul.ac.uk/bedford-centre/history-women-religious/ being the webpage of the History of Women Religious of Britain and Ireland, which has a number of entries on the links page.
