= Stacey M. Floyd-Thomas =

American author and educator

- Born: 1969 (age 56–57)
- Education: Vassar College (A.B., 1991); Emory University (M.T.S., 1993); Temple University (M.A., 1995; Ph.D., 1998)
- Occupation: Professor
- Years active: 1996–present
- Known for: Womanist ethics
- Notable work: Mining the Motherlode: Methods in Womanist Ethics
- Spouse: Juan Floyd-Thomas

Stacey M. Floyd-Thomas (born 1969) is an American author and educator. She is associate professor of ethics and society at Vanderbilt Divinity School and the Graduate Department of Religion at Vanderbilt University in Nashville, Tennessee. Floyd-Thomas is a Womanist Christian social ethicist whose research interests include Womanist thought, Black Church Studies, liberation theology and ethics, critical race theory, critical pedagogy and postcolonial studies.

Specifically, her work addresses tripartite oppression and religious responses to these forms of oppression. Race, class and gender are three social categories that contribute to the oppression of black women, and Floyd-Thomas' work addresses how religious commitments, particularly Christian sensibilities, work to either ameliorate these forms of oppression, or perpetuate them.

Floyd-Thomas is executive director of the Society of Christian Ethics.

== Training ==
Floyd-Thomas received her Ph.D. from Temple University in 1998. Her primary teacher and adviser was Katie Geneva Cannon. Cannon, a former student of Beverly Harrison, continues to mentor and influence Floyd-Thomas' work and pedagogical style.

== Womanist thought ==
In the late 1960s and 1970s, theological education was fundamentally altered through the development of black theology, most notably the work of theologian James Hal Cone. Cone, a professor at Union Theological Seminary in the City of New York, espoused a theological program that connected the black liberation struggle to the New Testament idea that God has a preferential option for the poor. Thus, God is "on the side of the oppressed."

Placing this idea within the context of the historic struggle for black liberation from the oppression of enslavement, Jim and Jane Crow laws, and continued racism, Cone's work placed a premium on experience as a source for "doing" theology. Yet, the experiences reflected upon by Cone and others were notably absent of black women's voices. To a large extent, Womanist thought developed as the corrective to this within black theology and ethics.

In the early 1980s, Katie Geneva Cannon, Jacquelyn Grant, and Delores Williams were students at Union Theological Seminary, whose teachers included James H. Cone, Beverly Harrison, and others. Just as Cone's black theology was noticeably absent of women's voices and experiences, Harrison's work centered around the perspective of white women. In both cases, the experiences of black women were subsumed into the experiences of either black men or white women. Cannon, Grant and Williams, while appreciating the work of early liberationists like Cone and Harrison, sought a way to frame their own experiences as black women.

They found such a frame in Alice Walker's In Search of Our Mothers' Gardens: Womanist Prose (1983). Walker defined "Womanist" in a four-part definition, that set the black female experience in contradistinction to both white women and black men. Using this frame, Womanist theology and ethics was born through the work of Cannon, Williams, and Grant.

Floyd-Thomas' work continues this Womanist scholarship started in theology and ethics.

== Works ==
=== Mining The Motherlode: Methods in Womanist Ethics ===
Of Floyd-Thomas' contributions to Womanist thought, perhaps the most pivotal has been her Mining the Motherlode: Methods in Womanist Ethics. In this text, Floyd-Thomas firmly grounds Womanist ethical methodology in Walker's definition of the term "Womanist" in order to highlight it as a unique and legitimate ethics within the larger discipline of Christian ethics, and provides an easy-to-use text for anyone wishing to do Womanist ethics. Paralleling the four-part definition provided by Walker, Floyd-Thomas names four "tenets" of Womanist ethics as "Radical Subjectivity, Traditional Communalism, Redemptive Self-Love and Critical Engagement." These tenets explore the relationship between Womanists' use of Walker's definition, and the various methodologies employed within Womanist ethics.

=== Other notable publications ===
Floyd-Thomas served as primary author/editor for other books. Deeper Shades of Purple: Womanism in Religion and Society collects various essays from many leading Womanist scholars and Womanist allies. Black Church Studies: An Introduction is a textbook that covers a range of disciplines that make up the interdisciplinary field of Black Church Studies. In 2010, she co-edited with theologian Anthony B. Pinn "Liberation Theologies in the United States: An Introduction."

In 2011, Floyd-Thomas co-edited two books with Miguel A. De La Torre titled Beyond the Pale—one subtitled Reading Ethics from the Margins (exploring twenty-four classic ethicists and philosophers from a Christian liberationist perspective), the other Reading Theology from the Margins (looking at thirty classic theologians) Her most recent publication co-authored with Juan M. Floyd-Thomas and Mark G. Toulouse, is entitled The Altars Where We Worship: The Religious Significance of Popular Culture.

Floyd-Thomas also serves as general editor of two-book series: Religion and Social Transformation (New York University Press) and 'Making It Plain': Approaches in Black Church Studies (Abingdon Press).

== Black Religious Scholars Group ==
The Black Religious Scholars Group is an organization founded by Floyd-Thomas, her husband Juan Floyd-Thomas, and Duane Belgrave while graduate students. It was conceptualized during a session of the Black Theology Group during the 1996 Annual Meeting of the American Academy of Religion/Society of Biblical Literature Annual Meeting in New Orleans. The mission of the organization is to "promote meaningful dialogue and partnership between black religious scholars, the larger black community and its churches and community organizations in order to promote the goals of black religion—namely, liberation and human fulfillment in all areas of life.

To this end, the BRSG functions "to make the academic work and activity of black religious scholars more relevant, committed and accessible to the larger Black church and community", and "to create opportunities for collaboration between black scholars, churches and community organizations in order to achieve the aforementioned goals of Black religion. This includes working together to address the many crises and quality-of-life challenges facing black communities

Held every year to coincide with the annual meeting of the American Academy of Religion, the BRSG consultation seeks to achieve the goal of its mission through fostering dialogue between black scholars and local black church communities, and through the specific consultations that occur at various black churches throughout the country. BRSG consultations have been held in cities ranging from San Diego to Washington, D.C. Also, the BRSG Consultation is a time where tribute is paid to black religious scholars who have contributed to the field of black religion while maintaining a commitment to black religion in practice outside of the academy.

Past BRSG honorees include James H. Cone, Peter Paris, Cornel West, J. Deotis Roberts, Henry and Ella Mitchell, Jacquelyn Grant, Katie G. Cannon, Vincent Harding, Delores S. Williams, Robert M. Franklin, Cheryl Townsend Gilkes, Gayraud S. Wilmore, Renita J. Weems, Walter E. Fluker, M. Shawn Copeland, Emilie Townes, Luther E. Smith, Jr., Cheryl Kirk-Duggan, Jeremiah A Wright Jr., Michael Eric Dyson, James A. Forbes, Jr., Randall C. Bailey, Teresa Fry Brown, Rev. Dr. Kelly Brown Douglas, Rev. Dr. James H. Evans, Jr., and others.

Floyd-Thomas continues to serve as executive director of the BRSG. Other executive board members include Dr. Juan Floyd-Thomas, Rev. Dr. Duane Belgrave, Rev. Dr. Christine Wiley, and Rev. Dr. Dennis Wiley, co-pastors of Covenant Baptist United Church of Christ in Washington, D.C.
