= Jacquelyn Grant =

American theologian (born 1948)

Rev. Dr. Jacquelyn Grant
- Born: December 19, 1948 (age 77); Georgetown, South Carolina, U.S.
- Occupations: Author, professor, theologian, Methodist Minister

Academic background
- Education: Bennett College (BA); Turner Theological Seminary (MDiv); Union Theological Seminary (MA and PhD)

Academic work
- Discipline: Womanism, ministry
- Institutions: Interdenominational Theological Center, Atlanta

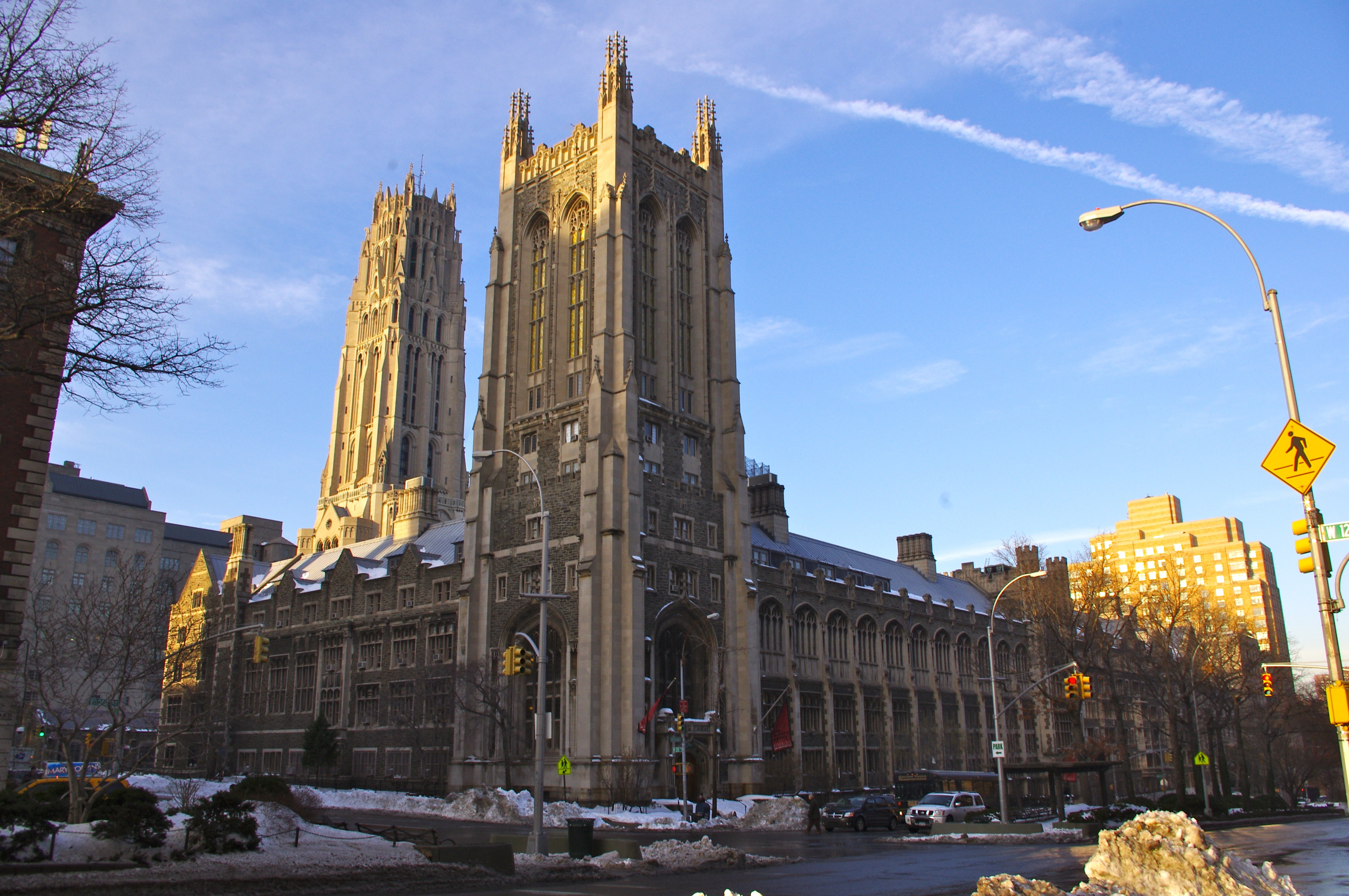
Union Theological Seminary, New York, New York

Jacquelyn Grant (born 1948) is an American theologian, a Methodist minister. Alongside Katie Cannon, Delores S. Williams, and Kelly Brown Douglas, Grant is considered one of the four founders of womanist theology. Womanist theology addresses theology from the viewpoint of Black women, reflecting on both their perspectives and experience in regards to faith and moral standards. Grant is currently the Callaway Professor of Systematic Theology at the Interdenominational Theological Center in Atlanta.

== Biography ==
Grant was born December 19, 1948, in Georgetown, South Carolina. She was one of nine children born to her father, the Rev. Joseph J Grant, a pastor, and her mother, Lillie Mae Grant, a cosmetologist. Grant grew up interested in religion, attending Catholic school at a young age and graduating from the local Howard High School in 1966. A graduate of Bennett College and Turner Theological Seminary, she became the first black woman to earn a doctoral degree in systematic theology at Union Theological Seminary.

Her doctoral thesis was titled "The development and limitations of feminist Christology: toward an engagement of white women's and black women's religious experiences." At Union, she worked under professor James H. Cone, who is known as the father of black theology.

Grant was ordained by the African Methodist Episcopal Church in 1974. In 1976 and 1980, Grant wrote and presented position papers at the denomination's General Conference titled "The Status of Women in the AME Church" and "The AME Church and Women," respectively. She founded the denomination's Women in Ministry organization, which later became the Commission on Women and Ministry.

In 1977, Grant became involved with Harvard Divinity School's Women's Research Program. Her involvement with this program led to the creation of the Women's Studies in Religion Program, in which she worked for two years. In this capacity:

She spearheaded efforts to bring women together to address the role and equality of women with a position paper on the status of women written for the 1976 General Conference, convening a meeting of the female ministers at the General Conference to voice concerns about representation in the governing processes and ministry of the AMEC, and leading a delegation to take these concerns before the Council of Bishops in 1977 at Atlantic City, New Jersey.

In 1981, Grant founded the Center for Black Women in Church and Society at the Interdenominational Theological Center in Atlanta in 1981, where she holds the title of Professor. The center's programs included The Womanist Scholars Program (WSP) and the Black Women in Ministerial Leadership Program (BWML).

Grant was the assistant minister at Flipper Temple African Methodist Episcopal Church from 1980 to 1982, and later the assistant minister at Victory African Methodist Episcopal Church in Atlanta. She is now the Fuller E. Callaway Professor of Systematic Theology at the Interdenominational Theological Union in Atlanta. She is the widow of the Rev. Dr. John W.P. Collier, Jr., who worked as the executive secretary for the AME Church's Department of Missions.

== Achievements and contributions ==
Grant is known for her commitment to building stronger communities and churches. In her professional capacities, she mentors numerous students, particularly women of color. Grant was featured as a contributor in the 1983 April issue of Ebony magazine to the article "School of Religion for Men Behind Bars" and to the article "Gifts of the Spirit" in the 1992 December issue.

Grant was the recipient of the Dr. Martin Luther King Jr. Ministry Award in 1986 and has been nominated as the Woman of the Year in Religion by the Iota Phi Lambda sorority. She has appeared in the Who's Who Among African Americans. Grant currently has a research project that examines African-American understanding of the divine through black theology and black art.

Grant has been professionally involved with a range of international and national organizations, including the World Council of Churches, the National Council of Churches, the Ecumenical Association of Third World Theologians, the American Academy of Religion, and the Society for the Study of Black Religion.

== As a womanist theologian ==
Theologian Jacquelyn Grant's scholarship "distinguishes between the remote and heavenly Christ worshipped in mainline white churches and the immanent and intimate Jesus whom black women recognize as their friend". Grant illuminates how many black women share a commitment in using their faith to avoid construction of stereotypes. Grant also examines how black women are the vast majority of active participants in their churches and that their work tends to be undervalued.

The professor and former pastor argues that women serving as activists for the black church are sometimes put into institutional categories for their political expression by the black church itself. Grant expounds on this and similar notions in her writings. She explains while it may sound like a compliment that black women are called the "backbone" of the church, in fact the author chides "the telling portion of the word backbone is 'back'. It has become apparent to me that most of the ministers who use this term have reference to location rather than function. What they really mean is that women are in the 'background' and should be kept there."

Grant, alongside Katie Cannon and Delores Williams, represents the first generation of womanist theologians. She differs from earlier black theologians such as James H. Cone, whose work Grant did not think adequately addressed the lived realities of black women. Grant highlights this critique of Cone's work by pointing out that "Black women have been invisible in theology including black theology and feminist theology". Grant also notably argues that the oppression of black women is different to that of black men. She also advances the idea that black women are more oppressed and ultimately need liberation more than white women and black men.

Grant and Cone both influenced scholar Delores S. Williams, who produced a commonly-referenced definition of womanist theology:

Womanist theology is a prophetic voice concerned about the well-being of the entire African American community, male and female, adults and children. Womanist theology attempts to help black women see, affirm, and have confidence in the importance of their experience and faith for determining the character of the Christian religion in the African American community. Womanist theology challenges all oppressive forces impeding black women's struggle for survival and for the development of a positive, productive quality of life conducive to women's and the family's freedom and well being. Womanist theology opposes all oppression based on race, sex, class, sexual preference, physical ability, and caste

== Book reception ==
Jacquelyn Grant is widely regarded as an important "womanist theologian." Her 1989 book White Women's Christ and Black Women's Jesus: Feminist Christology and Womanist Response was a best seller. The text lays out the complex relationship between Christology and feminism. In it, Grant centers the voices of black women and the intersections between Christology and womanist theology, addressing the historical and modern-day experiences of black women.

Grant's work in White Women's Christ and Black Women's Jesus: Feminist Christology and Womanist Response conveyed the "tri-dimensional reality render[ing Black women's] situation a complex one. One could say that not only are they the oppressed of the oppressed, but their situation represents the 'particular within the particular,'" as author Joan M. Martin points out in The Notion of Difference for Emerging Women Ethics. By exploring the relationship between black women and Jesus as a "divine co-sufferer", Grant's contribution to womanist theology provides meaningful examples and a theoretical framework to fuel conversation and research on an assortment of topics dealing with black women's experiences.

== Publications ==
- White Women's Christ and Black Women's Jesus: Feminist Christology and Womanist Response (Atlanta, Ga.: Scholars Press, 1989. American Academy of Religion academy series).
- (co-ed. with Randall C. Bailey) The Recovery of Black Presence: An Interdisciplinary Exploration : Essays in Honor of Dr. Charles B. Copher. Nashville: Abingdon Press, 1995.
- Perspectives on Womanist Theology. Atlanta: ITC Press, 1995.
- "Black women and the church" in Hull, Gloria T., Patricia Bell-Scott, and Barbara Smith (eds), All the Women Are White, All the Blacks Are Men, but Some of Us Are Brave: Black Women's Studies. Old Westbury, N.Y.: Feminist Press, 1982.
- "The challenge of the darker sister" in Soskice, Janet Martin, and Diana Lipton. Feminism and Theology. New York: Oxford University Press, 2003.
