= Shoutin' in the Fire: An American Epistle =

2021 book by Danté Stewart

- Author: Danté Stewart
- Language: English
- Genre: Christian literature
- Published: 2021
- Publisher: Convergent Books
- Publication place: United States of America
- Pages: 272
- ISBN: 0-593-23963-6
- OCLC: 1293223906
- Website: www.dantecstewart.com/book

Shoutin' in the Fire: An American Epistle is a semi-autobiographical book written by Danté Stewart and published by Convergent Books a subsidiary of Penguin Random House.

== Background ==
Shoutin' in the Fire is Stewart's debut book. The book's intended audience is black people and was not intended to be used as something that white people read to learn how to be antiracist. The book is a semi-autobiographical work in which Stewart wrestles with being Black, Christian, and American. Stewart and his book was influenced by James Baldwin. Stewart also points to Renita J. Weems as a source of inspiration. The book was published after the George Floyd protests. Howard Schaap compares the beginning of the book to the 1895 poem titled "We Wear the Mask" by Paul Lawrence Dunbar. Stewart describes growing up in a Pentecostal tradition.

According to Geez Magazine, Stewart "animates a compelling, humble vulnerability voiced on practically every single page ... every page is an open invitation to double-down on faith."

== See also ==
- The Fire Next Time
- The Cross and the Lynching Tree
