= Nyasha Junior =

American biblical scholar

- Citizenship: US
- Occupations: Biblical scholar; academic
- Known for: Womanist biblical interpretation

Academic background
- Education: Georgetown University; Princeton University; Pacific School of Religion; Princeton Theological Seminary

Academic work
- Discipline: Theology
- Institutions: Temple University
- Website: nyashajunior.com

Nyasha Junior is an American biblical scholar. Her research focuses on the connections between religion, race, and gender within the Hebrew Bible. She holds a PhD from Princeton Theological Seminary. She was associate professor at Temple University before moving to the University of Toronto in the department for the Study of Religion. She was a visiting associate professor and research associate at Harvard Divinity School for the 2020–21 academic year.

== Early life and education ==
Nyasha Junior grew up in Florida. Her family was very involved in the church, serving as ushers, pulpit speakers, and choir members.

Junior initially pursued a career in public policy, earning a Bachelor of Science in Foreign Service from Georgetown University and a Master of Public Administration from Princeton University. In her mid-twenties she made a career switch to Bible Studies. She earned a Master of Divinity from Pacific School of Religion and completed her PhD in Old Testament at Princeton Theological Seminary.

== Career ==
Junior is associate professor at the University of Toronto. She was previously associate professor of religion (Hebrew Bible) at Temple University. Her research examines intersections of gender, religion and race, including study of the life of evangelist Jarena Lee. She was also a visiting associate professor of Women's Studies and African-American Religions at Harvard University. She previously taught at Howard University. During her classes at Howard in 2014, she introduced preferred pronouns to the student roster. Elsewhere she has observed that: "Inclusion is not oppression, and student demands for greater inclusion are not bullying" with reference to university course alterations. She is described by Mitzi J Smith as being part of the third generation of womanist biblical scholars—although she personally does not identify as a womanist scholar. Her work on the life of Moses has been viewed as a starting point for how he can be seen as "the subject of feminist inquiry, not just the object of feminist critique".

In her first book, An Introduction to Womanist Biblical Interpretation, Junior compares feminist and womanist interpretations of the Bible and argues that "womanist biblical interpretation [was] a natural development of African American women engaging in activism instead of simply [as] a response to second-wave feminism". The book offers readers an understanding of how the lived experience of black women influences their interpretations of Christianity. It was one of the first texts to introduce womanist biblical interpretation.

Junior has co-authored a book on Samson with Temple University colleague Jeremy Schipper.

The project and subsequent book, Reimagining Hagar, was inspired by the insistence of some of her students that of all the female biblical characters, Hagar was the most strongly associated with blackness.

As of 2020, Junior is involved in a research project with Harvard Divinity School titled "The Resurrection of Jarena Lee". Jarena Lee was a Black Christian preacher denied ordination in the 1800s and who, in 2016, was posthumously ordained by the African Methodist Episcopal Church.

== Research and major publications ==
=== Reimagining Hagar: Blackness and Bible ===
Nyasha Junior's book, Reimagining Hagar: Blackness and Bible was published in 2019. In this book, Junior provides a reception history of the Biblical character Hagar, whose story is found in Genesis 16 and 21. Reimagining Hagar focuses on interpretations of Hagar as a black woman and particularly those interpretations of Hagar that are made by African Americans. Junior examines interpretations of Hagar and how markers of difference like gender, ethnicity, and status intersect in various portrayals of Hagar. In Reimagining Hagar, Junior: "argues that there is an African presence in Biblical texts, identifies and responds to White supremacist interpretations, provides a cultural-historical interpretation that attends to the history of biblical interpretation within Black communities, and provides ideological criticism that uses the African-American context as a reading strategy." Junior has received much praise for this book, with critic Andrew S. Jacobs writing, "In chasing down the 'mystery of Black Hagar,' Nyasha Junior uncovers a deeper story: about cultural resistance to the 'White default' of the Bible and its continued Orientalist, anti-Black, anti-Jewish, and anti-woman uses."

=== Black Samson: The Untold Story of an American Icon ===
A collaboration between Nyasha Junior and Jeremy Schipper, Black Samson: The Untold Story of an American Icon was published July 1, 2020. The book details how the Biblical character Samson was a figure used to represent individuals who would fight for racial equality in America. Detailing how Samson from Judges 13–16 became a central figure for Black Americans and was used in literature and other means of social revolution to discuss racial inequality in the United States. The book also discusses various other Biblical figures as well as their connections to historical figures such as Frederick Douglass, Ida B. Wells, James Baldwin, Malcolm X and Martin Luther King Jr. Junior and Schipper explore the connection between Biblical narratives and their importance in Black American history in an attempt to bridge the gap between the two subjects. English New Testament Scholar Candida Moss has said in a Daily Beast review that the book by "researching previously ignored first-person narratives of enslaved and formerly enslaved people, newspaper articles, modern media, and poetry, they argue that the ambiguities in the Samson story make him an interesting and complicated figure with which to think about race and modes of resisting injustice."

== See also ==
- Womanist theology

== Bibliography ==
=== Publications ===
- Schipper, Jeremy; Junior, Nyasha (2020). Black Samson: The Untold Story of an American Icon. Oxford University Press. ISBN 978-0-19-068979-7. OCLC 1137178467.
- Junior, Nyasha (2019). Reimagining Hagar. doi:10.1093/oso/9780198745327.001.0001. ISBN 978-0-19-874532-7.
- Junior, Nyasha (2015). An Introduction to Womanist Biblical Interpretation. Westminster John Knox Press. ISBN 978-1-61164-630-6.
- Junior, Nyasha (2006). "Womanist Biblical Interpretation". In Day, Linda; Pressler, Carolyn (eds.). Engaging the Bible in a Gendered World: An Introduction to Feminist Biblical Interpretation in Honor of Katharine Doob Sakenfeld. Presbyterian Publishing Corp. pp. 37–46. ISBN 978-0-664-22910-8. OCLC 70158516.
- O'Donnell Setel, Drorah (January 1, 1998). "Exodus". In Newsom, Carol Ann; Ringe, Sharon H. (eds.). Women's Bible Commentary. Westminster John Knox Press. pp. 30–48. ISBN 978-0-664-25781-1. OCLC 38047996.
- Junior, Nyasha (September 7, 2017). "Uncompromising Activist: Richard Greener, First Black Graduate of Harvard College". Diverse Issues in Higher Education. 34 (16): 22. ProQuest 1937364336.
- Junior, Nyasha (January 25, 2018). "Modern Black Intellectualism". Diverse Issues in Higher Education. 34 (26): 24. ProQuest 1991582436.
- "AAR/SBL 2019 Review Panel | Imagined Black Death". ANCIENT JEW REVIEW.
- Junior, Nyasha (May 17, 2014). "Me and My Regalia". Feminist Studies in Religion.

=== Articles ===
Junior has published articles with a variety of media outlets, including:

- Review of 'Game of Queens' by India Edghill in Washington Independent Review of Books
- On the relationship of black women with feminism in The Washington Post
- Interview with Keri Day in the Los Angeles Review of Books
- Interview with Marla F Frederick in the Los Angeles Review of Books
- "The Story of the Black King Among the Magi" in Hyperallergic Magazine (January 6, 2020)
- "Jezebel Isn't Who You Think She Is" in DAME Magazine (November 5, 2019)
- "Remembering Cain Hope Felder, Scholar Who Highlighted the Bible's African Presence" in Religion & Politics (November 12, 2019)
- "Black Church Taught Me How to Be Black" in Buzzfeed News (June 23, 2015)
