= James H. Cone =

American minister and theologian (1938–2018)

The Reverend James H. Cone
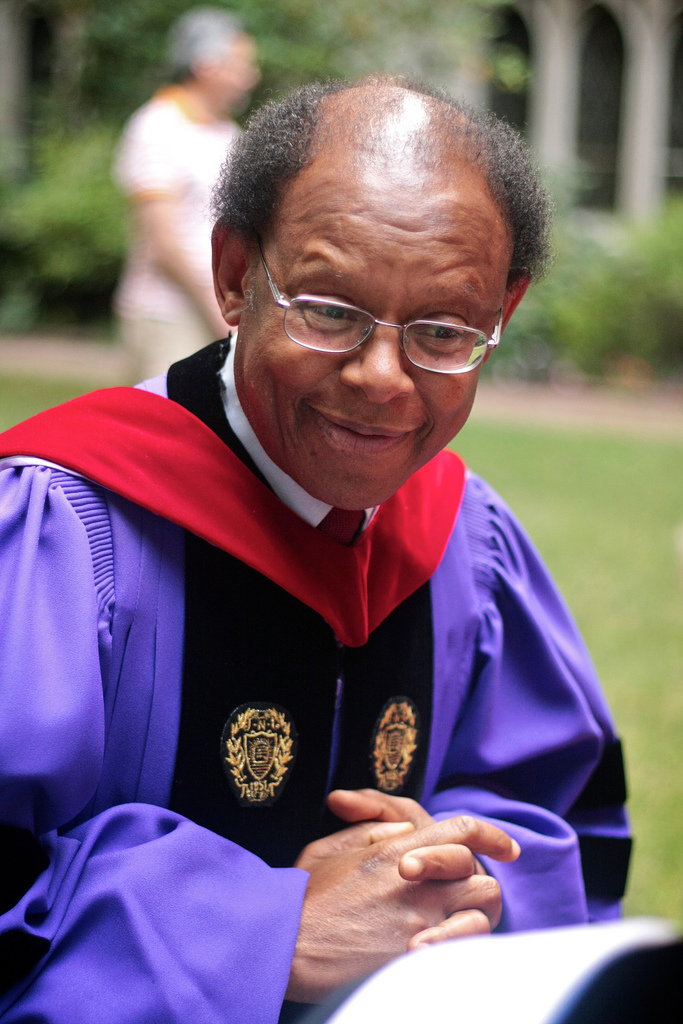
- Cone in 2009
- Born: James Hal Cone; August 5, 1938; Fordyce, Arkansas, U.S.
- Died: April 28, 2018 (aged 79); New York City, U.S.
- Spouses: Rose H. Cone (m. 1958; div. c. 1978); Sondra Gibson (m. 1979; died 1983)
- Awards: Grawemeyer Award (2018)

Ecclesiastical career
- Religion: Christianity (Methodist)
- Church: African Methodist Episcopal Church

Academic background
- Education: Philander Smith College; Garrett–Evangelical Theological Seminary; Northwestern University
- Thesis: The Doctrine of Man in the Theology of Karl Barth (1965)
- Influences: Karl Barth; William Hordern; Martin Luther King Jr.; Malcolm X; James Baldwin; Paul Tillich

Academic work
- Discipline: Theology
- Sub-discipline: Systematic theology
- School or tradition: Black liberation theology
- Institutions: Philander Smith College; Adrian College; Union Theological Seminary
- Doctoral students: Jacquelyn Grant
- Notable students: Kelly Brown Douglas; Dwight Hopkins; Raphael Warnock
- Notable works: A Black Theology of Liberation (1970)
- Notable ideas: Black liberation theology
- Influenced: Steve Biko; Manas Buthelezi; Allan Boesak; Cain Hope Felder; Obery M. Hendricks Jr.; James D. Kirylo; Basil Moore; Conrad Tillard; Desmond Tutu; Preston Washington; Jeremiah Wright

James Hal Cone (August 5, 1938 – April 28, 2018) was an American Methodist minister and theologian. He is best known for his advocacy of black theology and black liberation theology. His 1969 book Black Theology and Black Power provided a new way to comprehensively define the distinctiveness of theology in the black church. His message was that Black Power, defined as black people asserting the humanity that white supremacy denied, was the gospel in America. Jesus came to liberate the oppressed, advocating the same thing as Black Power. He argued that white American churches preached a gospel based on white supremacy, antithetical to the gospel of Jesus.

Cone's work continues to be influential from the time of the book's publication to the present day. His work has been both used and critiqued inside and outside the African-American theological community. He was the Charles Augustus Briggs Distinguished Professor of Systematic Theology at Columbia University–affiliated Union Theological Seminary until his death.

== Life and career ==
Cone was born on August 5, 1938, in Fordyce, Arkansas, and grew up in the racially segregated town of Bearden, Arkansas. He and his family attended Macedonia African Methodist Episcopal Church in Bearden. He attended Shorter College (1954–1956), a small AME Church junior college, before receiving a Bachelor of Arts degree from Philander Smith College in 1958, where he was mentored by James and Alice Boyack. In his 2018 memoir Said I Wasn't Gonna Tell Nobody, Cone wrote that they were the first whites he met who respected his humanity. Although he had decided against parish ministry, their advice led him to obtain a Bachelor of Divinity degree from Garrett–Evangelical Theological Seminary in 1961, and Master of Arts and Doctor of Philosophy degrees from their joint program with Northwestern University in 1963 and 1965, respectively. He was shocked to learn that most northern whites would not treat him with respect like the Boyacks. Yet he was excited to learn of unfamiliar theologians, controversies, and biblical study methodologies. At the urging of and with support from the white theologian William Hordern at Garrett he applied and gained acceptance into the doctoral program in theology.

He taught theology and religion at Philander Smith College, Adrian College, and beginning in 1970 at Union Theological Seminary in New York City, where he was awarded the distinguished Charles A. Briggs Chair in systematic theology in 1977. In 2018, he was elected as a fellow of the American Academy of Arts and Sciences.

Cone and his wife, Rose Hampton, married in 1958 and divorced in 1977. They had two sons, Micheal and Charles. In 1979, Cone married Sondra Gibson, who died in 1983. They raised two daughters, Krystal and Robynn. He died on April 28, 2018.

== Theology ==
=== Hermeneutics ===
Cone wrote, "Exodus, prophets and Jesus—these three—defined the meaning of liberation in black theology." The hermeneutic, or interpretive lens, for James Cone's theology starts with the experience of African Americans, and the theological questions he brings from his own life. He incorporates the powerful role of the black church in his life, as well as racism experienced by African Americans. For Cone, the theologians he studied in graduate school did not provide meaningful answers to his questions. This disparity became more apparent when he was teaching theology at Philander Smith College in Little Rock, Arkansas. Cone writes, "What could Karl Barth possibly mean for black students who had come from the cotton fields of Arkansas, Louisiana and Mississippi, seeking to change the structure of their lives in a society that had defined black as non-being?"

Cone's theology also received significant inspiration from a frustration with the black struggle for civil rights; he felt that black Christians in North America should not follow the "white Church", on the grounds that it was a willing part of the system that had oppressed black people. Accordingly, his theology was heavily influenced by Malcolm X and the Black Power movement. Martin Luther King Jr. was also an important influence; Cone describes King as a liberation theologian before the phrase existed. Cone wrote, "I was on a mission to transform self-loathing Negro Christians into black-loving revolutionary disciples of the Black Christ." Nevertheless, "The black church, despite its failures, gives black people a sense of worth."

=== Methodology ===
His methodology for answering the questions raised by the African-American experience is a return to scripture, and particularly to the liberative elements such as the Exodus-Sinai tradition, prophets and the life and teaching of Jesus. However, scripture is not the only source that shapes his theology. In response to criticism from other black theologians and religious scholars (including his brother, Cecil), Cone began to make greater use of resources native to the African-American Christian community for his theological work, including slave spirituals, the blues, and the writings of prominent African-American thinkers such as David Walker, Henry McNeal Turner, and W. E. B. Du Bois. His theology developed further in response to critiques by black women, leading Cone to consider gender issues more prominently and foster the development of womanist theology, and also in dialogue with Marxist analysis and the sociology of knowledge.

=== Contextual theology ===
Cone's thought, along with Paul Tillich, stresses the idea that theology is not universal, but tied to specific historical contexts; he thus critiques the Western tradition of abstract theologizing by examining its social context. Cone formulates a theology of liberation from within the context of the black experience of oppression, interpreting the central kernel of the Gospels as Jesus' identification with the poor and oppressed, the resurrection as the ultimate act of liberation.

As part of his theological analysis, Cone argues for God's own identification with "blackness":

The black theologian must reject any conception of God which stifles black self-determination by picturing God as a God of all peoples. Either God is identified with the oppressed to the point that their experience becomes God's experience, or God is a God of racism. ... The blackness of God means that God has made the oppressed condition God's own condition. This is the essence of the biblical revelation. By electing Israelite slaves as the people of God and by becoming the Oppressed One in Jesus Christ, the human race is made to understand that God is known where human beings experience humiliation and suffering. ... Liberation is not an afterthought, but the very essence of divine activity.

Despite his associations with the Black Power movement, however, Cone was not entirely focused on ethnicity: "Being black in America has little to do with skin color. Being black means that your heart, your soul, your mind, and your body are where the dispossessed are."

In 1977, Cone wrote, with a still more universal vision:

I think the time has come for black theologians and black church people to move beyond a mere reaction to white racism in America and begin to extend our vision of a new socially constructed humanity in the whole inhabited world ... For humanity is whole, and cannot be isolated into racial and national groups.

In his 1998 essay "White Theology Revisited", however, he retains his earlier strong critique of the white church and white man for ignoring or failing to address the problem of race.

=== Early influences ===
Cone credits his parents as being his most important early influences. His father had only a sixth-grade education but filed a lawsuit against the Bearden, Arkansas, school board despite threats on his life. White professors of religion and philosophy, James and Alice Boyack at Philander Smith College aided his belief in his own potential and deepened his interest in theodicy and black suffering. He found a mentor, advisor and influential teacher in Garrett scholar William E. Hordern. Professor Philip Watson motivated him to intensive remedial study of English composition. Classmate Lester B. Scherer was a great help in this. Scherer volunteered to edit manuscripts of Cone's early books while Cone's wife Rose typed them, yet Cone complained that neither understood him. Cone wrote his doctoral thesis on Karl Barth. A 1965 breakfast meeting with Benjamin Mays, president of Morehouse College in Atlanta, convinced him that teaching and scholarship were his true calling. The sociologist C. Eric Lincoln found publishers for his early books (Black Theology and Black Power and A Black Theology of Liberation) which sought to deconstruct mainstream Protestant theologians such as Barth, Niebuhr and Tillich while seeking to draw on the figures of the black church such as Richard Allen (founder in 1816 of the AME Church), black abolitionists ministers Henry Highland Garnet, Daniel Payne, and Henry McNeil Turner ("God is a Negro") and Martin Luther King Jr., Malcolm X, James Baldwin, and other figures of the black power and black arts movement.

== Criticism ==
=== Womanist critique ===
Womanist theologians, such as Delores Williams, have critiqued Cone for both male-centered language and for not including the experiences of black women in his sources. Williams, in 1993, acknowledged in a footnote in her book Sisters in the Wilderness that Cone has modified exclusive language for the reprinting of his works and acknowledged the issues with the previous language. However, she argues that he still does not use the experiences of African-American women in his method, and therefore still needs to deal with the sexism of his work.

=== Other scholarly critiques ===
Other critiques of Cone's theological positions have focused on the need to rely more heavily on sources reflecting black experience in general, on Cone's lack of emphasis on reconciliation within the context of liberation, and on his ideas of God and theodicy. Charles H. Long and other founding members of the Society for the Study of Black Religion were critics of Cone's work. Long rejected black theology, contending that theology itself was a western invention alien to the black experience. Others objected to his endorsement of Black Power, lack of interest in reconciliation and concern with scoring academic points.

== Political commentary and controversy ==
Aspects of Cone's theology and words for some people have been the subject of controversy in the political context of the 2008 US presidential campaign as Jeremiah Wright, at that time pastor of then-candidate Barack Obama, noted that he had been inspired by Cone's theology.

Some scholars of black theology noted that controversial quotes by Wright may not necessarily represent black theology. Cone responded to these alleged controversial comments by noting that he was generally writing about historic white churches and denominations that did nothing to oppose slavery and segregation rather than any white individual.

== Educator ==
After receiving his doctorate, Cone taught theology and religion at Philander Smith College and Adrian College. At the urging of his mentor, C. Eric Lincoln, Union Theological Seminary in New York City hired him as assistant professor in 1969. He remained there until his death in 2018; he eventually had an endowed full professorship. Cone made significant contributions to theological education in America. Prior to Cone's arrival in 1969, Union Theological Seminary had not accepted a black student into its doctoral program since its founding in 1836. During his career there, Cone supervised over 40 black doctoral students. These included Dwight Hopkins and some of the founders of womanist theology Delores Williams, Jacquelyn Grant, and Kelly Brown Douglas. He also taught Conrad Tillard, the former Minister of Mosque No. 7 and the Nation of Islam. He delivered countless lectures at other universities and conferences.

== Works ==
- Black Theology and Black Power (1969, ISBN 1-57075-157-9) | Find at Orbis Books
- A Black Theology of Liberation (1970, ISBN 0-88344-685-5) | Find at Orbis Books
- The Spirituals and the Blues: An Interpretation (1972 ISBN 0-8164-2073-4) | Find at Orbis Books
- God of the Oppressed (1975, ISBN 1-57075-158-7) | Find at Orbis Books
- For My People: Black Theology and the Black Church (Where Have We Been and Where Are We Going?) (1984, ISBN 0-88344-106-3) | Find at Orbis Books
- Speaking the Truth: Ecumenism, Liberation, and Black Theology (1986, ISBN 1-57075-241-9)
- Martin & Malcolm & America: A Dream or a Nightmare? (1992, ISBN 0-88344-824-6) | Find at Orbis Books
- Risks of Faith: The Emergence of a Black Theology of Liberation, 1968-1998 (1999, ISBN 0-8070-0950-4)
- The Cross and the Lynching Tree (2011, ISBN 978-1-57075-937-6) | Find at Orbis Books — German edition: Kreuz und Lynchbaum (2019, ISBN 978-3-9817459-4-8) | Find at mutual blessing edition
- My Soul Looks Back (1982, ISBN 978-0-88344-355-2) | Find at Orbis Books
- Said I wasn't gonna tell nobody: the making of a Black theologian (2018, ISBN 978-1-62698-302-1) | Find at Orbis Books

== See also ==
- Delores Williams
- Albert Cleage
- Gustavo Gutiérrez
- J. Deotis Roberts

Awards
Preceded by Gary Dorrien	Grawemeyer Award in Religion; 2018	Succeeded by Robert P. Jones
