= Katie Cannon =

American theologian (1950–2018)

The Reverend Doctor Katie Cannon
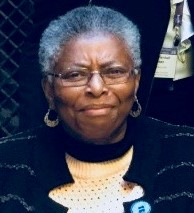
- Born: Katie Geneva Cannon; January 3, 1950; Kannapolis, North Carolina, US
- Died: August 8, 2018 (aged 68); Richmond, Virginia, U.S.

Ecclesiastical career
- Religion: Christianity
- Church: United Presbyterian Church in the United States of America; Presbyterian Church (USA)
- Ordained: 1974
- Congregations: 1974 Ascension Presbyterian Church in New York, New York

Academic background
- Education: Barber–Scotia College; Johnson C. Smith Theological Seminary; Union Theological Seminary
- Thesis: Resources for a Constructive Ethic for Black Women with Special Attention to the Life and Work of Zora Neale Hurston (1983)
- Influences: Roger L. Shinn; Beverly Wildung Harrison

Academic work
- Discipline: Theology
- Sub-discipline: Christian ethics
- School or tradition: Black theology; womanist theology
- Institutions: Episcopal Divinity School; Temple University; Union Presbyterian Seminary
- Doctoral students: Stacey M. Floyd-Thomas
- Influenced: Ada María Isasi-Díaz

Katie Geneva Cannon (January 3, 1950 – August 8, 2018) was an American Christian theologian and ethicist associated with womanist theology and black theology. In 1974 she became the first African-American woman ordained in the United Presbyterian Church (USA).

== Early life ==
Born on January 3, 1950, Cannon spent her childhood in Kannapolis, North Carolina, a racially segregated community where she could not use local facilities such as the YMCA, swimming pool or library. She was the daughter of the late Esau Cannon and Emanuelette Corine Lytle Cannon, the first woman to work at the Cannon Mills in Kannapolis. Both her parents were elders in the Presbyterian Church, but she was enrolled in kindergarten at a Lutheran church, the only early childhood education available to her in Kannapolis as a black girl. Cannon had six brothers and sisters.

== Education and career ==
Cannon graduated from George Washington Carver High School in 1967 as her class's salutatorian. Cannon graduated with a Bachelor of Science degree in education from Barber–Scotia College, followed by a Master of Divinity from Johnson C. Smith Theological Seminary at the Interdenominational Theological Center in Atlanta, Georgia, and both a Master's and Doctor of Philosophy degree from Union Theological Seminary in New York.

Cannon was ordained on April 24, 1974, in Shelby, North Carolina, by the Catawba Presbytery, in the Synod of Catawba. This made her the first African-American woman to be ordained in the United Presbyterian Church (USA). Cannon worked at Ascension Presbyterian Church in East Harlem, New York.

Cannon began teaching at Union Presbyterian Seminary in Richmond in 2001. She held the position of the Annie Scales Rogers Professor of Christian Social Ethics. Prior to joining the faculty at Union Presbyterian Seminary, Cannon was on the faculties of Temple University, Episcopal Divinity School, and Harvard Divinity School. She was also the Lilly Distinguished Visiting Professor of Religion at Davidson College and the Sterling Brown Visiting Professor in Religion and African American Studies at Williams College.

In addition to her breaking ground as an African American woman scholar of religion, Cannon collaborated with African women scholars of religion, including Mercy Amba Oduyoye. Cannon was one of few African American women present at the founding meeting of the Circle of Concerned African Women Theologians.

In 2012, Cannon began serving as executive director of the Squaring the Womanist Circle Project at Union Presbyterian Seminary. Following from the research results produced by the project, Cannon worked with the administration of Union Presbyterian Seminary and several foundations to establish The Center For Womanist Leadership at Union Presbyterian Seminary. The center is the first of its kind at any theological academic institution in the United States. From 2004 to 2008, she served as president of the Society for the Study of Black Religion.

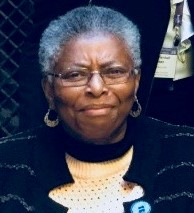
Katie Geneva Cannon

Cannon received the distinguished professor award from Spelman College, the Lucy Craft Laney Award at the Black Presbyterian Bicentennial Celebration, and was a professor-scholar honoree at the National Black Church Summit at Emory University. She received the Beautiful Are The Feet Award from the Samuel DeWitt Proctor Conference. The American Academy of Religion honored Cannon with its 2011 Excellence in Teaching Award. In 2018, Cannon was honored at the Presbyterian Church (USA)'s General Assembly, receiving the Excellence in Theological Education Award.

As her last living will and testament, Cannon founded and organized the Center for Womanist Leadership at Union Presbyterian Seminary in April 2018, which was later endowed and renamed The Katie Geneva Cannon Center for Womanist Leadership. Cannon died on August 8, 2018, from leukemia.

== Influence on womanist theology and ethics ==
Cannon is widely regarded as one of the founders of womanist theology and ethics. In reflecting on her legacy, scholar Traci C. West notes Cannon's emphasis on using black women's embodied knowledge as a source for ethical reflection:

In her analytical approach, one finds a sharp conceptualization of both the strength and vulnerability of black women especially evident in their collisions with white supremacy. Katie Cannon's scholarship reveals the ugliness of white racism and how it preys on black women's human vulnerabilities. To reveal the ugliness demands courage because it is so painful. The reflective process of unravelling the impact of racist patterns, as well as the commitment to remaining focused on them and inviting others to do so too, requires scholarly and spiritual stamina. Katie Cannon's work provides us with historically rooted, geopolitically situated, and intimate examples of black women's epistemological strength. She depicts black women's embodied knowledge as a creative force. The task of the womanist ethicist, she insisted, is to uncover and comprehend it.

Cannon's first full-length book, Black Womanist Ethics, published in 1988, was a groundbreaking text, and is considered to have launched the field of womanist ethics.

== Publications ==
- God's Fierce Whimsy: The Implications of Feminism for Theological Education. Pilgrim Press, 1985
- Inheriting Our Mothers' Gardens: Feminist Theology in Third World Perspective. Letty M. Russell, Ada Maria Isasi-Diaz, Kwok Pui-lan, and Katie Geneva Cannon, editors. Westminster John Knox Press, 1988. ISBN 9780664250195.
- Katie's Canon: Womanism and the Soul of the Black Community. Continuum, 1998. ISBN 978-0826410344.
  - Published in 1998 by the Continuum International Publishing Group, Cannon argues the importance of womanism from a religious, literary and political perspective. Through a series of essays, Cannon continually reviews the role that gender, race and class have held in the formation of black feminist consciousness. Through looking at the intersection between African American women's lived experience of oppression, and faith, Cannon explains how African American women how found themselves in a position of moral guides not just in the African American tradition but also America.
- Black Womanist Ethics, Oxford University Press, 1988
- Teaching Preaching: Isaac Rufus Clark and Black Sacred Rhetoric. Continuum, 2007. ISBN 978-0826428974.
- Womanist Theological Ethics: A Reader. Katie Geneva Cannon, Emilie M. Townes, and Angela D. Sims, editors. Westminster John Knox Press, 2011. ISBN 978-0664235376.
- The Oxford Handbook of African American Theology, Oxford University Press, 2014
- Katie's Canon: Womanism and the Soul of the Black Community, 25th Anniversary Revised and Expanded Edition. Fortress, 2021. ISBN 9781506471297.

== Death ==
Cannon died from acute leukemia in Richmond, Virginia on August 8, 2018. She was 68.
