= Cheryl J. Sanders =

Cheryl Jeanne Sanders
- Occupations: Minister, academic

Academic background
- Education: Th.D.
- Alma mater: Harvard Divinity School

Academic work
- Discipline: Christian Ethics, Womanist ethics
- Institutions: Howard University School of Divinity
- Notable works: Saints in Exile

Cheryl J. Sanders is an African-American professor and scholar of Christian Ethics. Her work on womanist ethics has been influential in the development of the field. She teaches Christian Ethics at Howard University School of Divinity. Her books include Ministry at the Margins, Saints in Exile: The Holiness Pentecostal Experience in African American Religion, and Empowerment Ethics for a Liberated People: A Path to African American Social Transformation.

== Biography ==
Cheryl Jeanne Sanders grew up in Washington, D.C. She attended Swathmore College, where she majored in mathematics, and minored in Black studies. She then decided to pursue studies in theology, and completed a Master of Divinity (MDiv) degree at Harvard Divinity School (HDS) in 1980. She continued her studies at HDS, completing a Doctor of Theology degree (ThD) in 1985. The title of her doctoral thesis was "Slavery and Conversion: An Analysis of Ex-slave Testimony." She noted in an interview at Harvard that she was 'fascinated by oral histories, fascinated by people giving religious testimonies."

A professor of Christian Ethics at Howard University, Sanders is the author of several books and articles related to Christian ethics, African-American religious history, Pentecostalism, and womanist theology. In 2018, two of her books, Empowerment Ethics for a Liberated People and Ministry at the Margins: The Prophetic Mission for Women, Youth, and the Poor, were included in a list of recommended reading for Black History Month by CBE International.

Sanders is also an ordained minister in the Church of God. She is the senior pastor of the Third Street Church of God in Washington, D.C., where she has been in ministry since 1995; she has been the senior pastor there since 1997. Third Street is also the same church where she was raised as a child.

As pastor of Third Street Church, Sanders oversaw the building of an annex and a restoration of the sanctuary in 2014. The proposed renovations encountered resistance when Sanders sought to create new parking lots for the congregation. The neighborhood blocked the effort due to concerns about the demolition of historic buildings.

In an interview in The Washington Post, about abortion rights, Sanders held that the bible may be "pro-life" but expressed an unwillingness to be associated with the political movement.

Sanders has cautioned against over simplifying "terrorists" as evil, noting that the "war" against anti-Black terrorism in during the civil rights movement was "won" by righteousness and not weapons.

At a speech given in 2014 at the Martin Luther King Jr., Lecture Series at Fuller Theological Seminary, Sanders highlighted seven leadership roles that King demonstrated, which she felt should be emulated by clergy and religious leaders. They were "orator; organizer; opportunist; optimist; operative; organic intellectual; and oracle."

== Works ==
- Sanders, Cheryl J. "Social Justice: Theology as Social Transformation" in The Routledge Handbook of Pentecostal Theology, Wolfgang Vondey, ed. (2020)
- Sanders, Cheryl J. Ministry at the Margins : the Prophetic Mission of Women, Youth & the Poor (1997)
- Sanders, Cheryl J. Saints in Exile : the Holiness-Pentecostal Experience in African American Religion and Culture (1996)
- Sanders, Cheryl J. Empowerment ethics for a liberated people : a path to African American social transformation (1995)
- Sanders, Cheryl J., ed. Living the Intersection: Womanism and Afrocentrism in Theology (1995) ISBN 9780800628529
