= Karen Jo Torjesen =

American scholar of religion and early Christianity

- Occupation: Scholar of religion
- Employer: Claremont Graduate University
- Title: Professor Emerita of Religion

Academic background
- Education: Claremont Graduate University (PhD); Claremont School of Theology (MA); Wheaton College (BS)

Academic work
- Discipline: Religious studies
- Sub-discipline: Early Christianity, patristics
- Notable works: When Women Were Priests (1993)

Karen Jo Torjesen is an American scholar of religion and early Christianity. She is professor emerita of Religion at Claremont Graduate University. She is the author of, among others, When Women Were Priests: Women’s Leadership in the Early Church and the Scandal of Their Subordination in the Rise of Christianity.

== Selected works ==
- Torjesen, Karen Jo. Hermeneutical Procedure and Theological Method in Origen's Exegesis. Berlin: Walter de Gruyter, 1985.
- Torjesen, Karen Jo. When Women Were Priests. San Francisco: HarperSanFrancisco, 1993.
- Torjesen, Karen Jo; Kirk-Duggan, Cheryl (eds.). Women and Christianity. Santa Barbara: ABC-CLIO, 2010.
- Torjesen, Karen. "The Role of Women in the Early Greek and Syriac Churches." In V. C. Samuel, Geevarghese Panicker, and Jacob Thekeparampil (eds.), The Harp, vol. 4. Piscataway, New Jersey: Gorgias Press, 2012, pp. 135–144.
