= Cain Hope Felder =

American biblical scholar (1943–2019)

The Reverend Cain Hope Felder
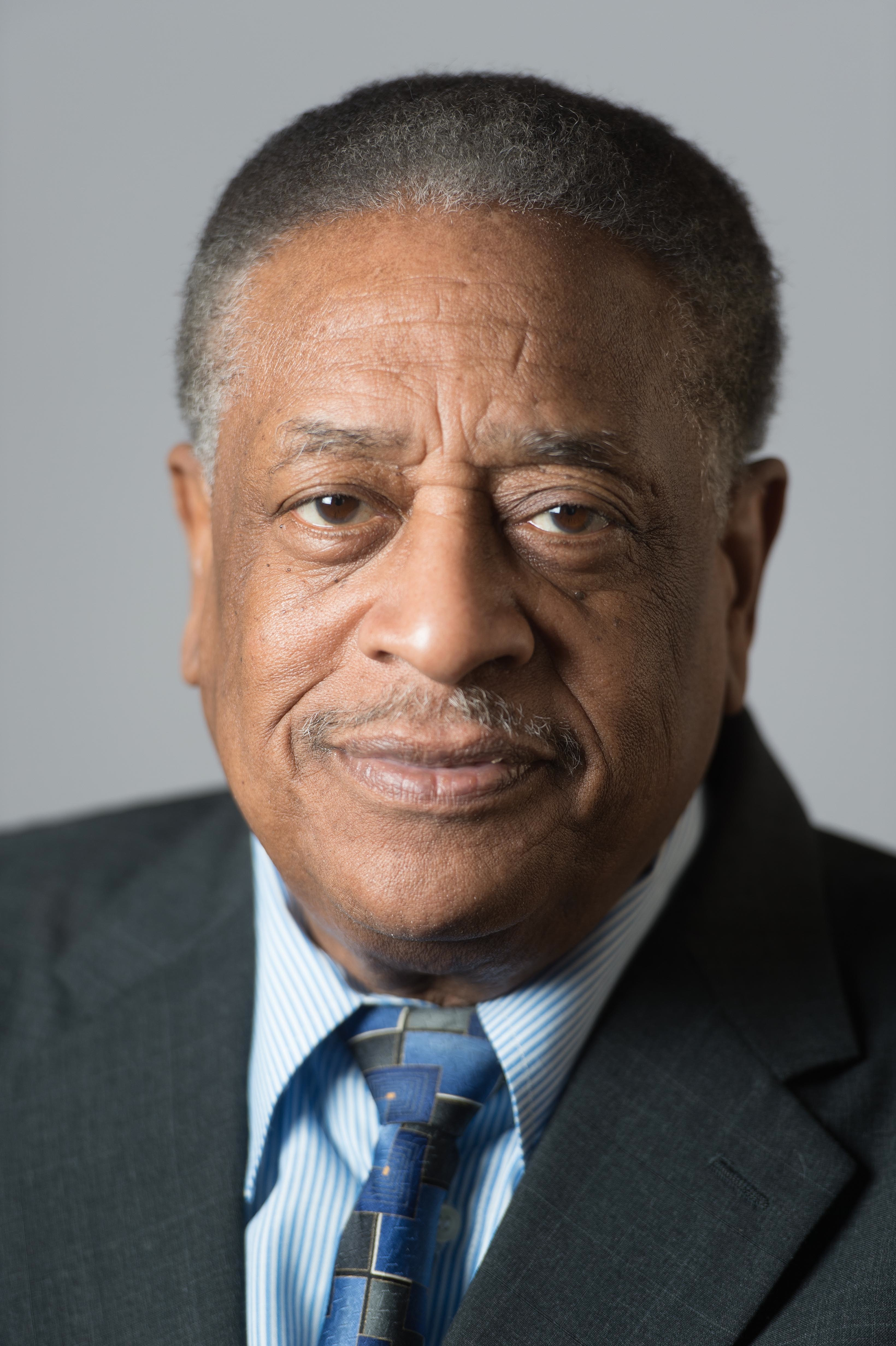
- Felder in 2014
- Born: June 9, 1943; Aiken, South Carolina, U.S.
- Died: October 1, 2019 (aged 76); Mobile, Alabama, U.S.

Ecclesiastical career
- Religion: Christianity (Methodist)
- Church: United Methodist Church; African Methodist Episcopal Church

Academic background
- Education: Howard University; Union Theological Seminary; Columbia University
- Thesis: Wisdom, Law and Social Concern in the Epistle of James (1982)
- Influences: James H. Cone

Academic work
- Discipline: Biblical studies
- Sub-discipline: New Testament studies
- Institutions: Princeton Theological Seminary; Howard University
- Notable students: Brian Blount

Cain Hope Felder (June 9, 1943 – October 1, 2019) was an American biblical scholar, serving as professor of New Testament language and literature and editor of The Journal of Religious Thought at the Howard University School of Divinity. He also served as chair of the Doctor of Philosophy program and immediate past chair of the Doctor of Ministry program. He had been on Howard's faculty from 1981 until his retirement in 2016.

== Biography ==
Prior to coming to Howard, he taught within the Department of Biblical Studies (1978–1981) at Princeton Theological Seminary. From 1969 to 1972, Felder worked as the first executive director of Black Methodists for Church Renewal, the black caucus of the United Methodist Church, which was headquartered in Atlanta, Georgia. Originally ordained as an elder in the United Methodist Church, he served as pastor of Grace United Methodist Church in New York City (1975–1977). Until his death, Felder served as an elder in the Second Episcopal District of the African Methodist Episcopal Church, where he was appointed by Bishop Adam Jefferson Richardson as the resident biblical scholar for the district.

From 1998 to 2001, Felder served as chair of the implementation panel for the National Center for African American Heritage & Culture at Howard University. He was on Howard's faculty from 1981 to 2016, having come to Washington from Princeton Theological Seminary, where he taught as a member of the Department of Biblical Studies (1978–1981).

His publications include True to Our Native Land (Augsburg Fortress, May, 2007); Troubling Biblical Waters: Race, Class, and Family (Orbis Books, 1989) – 16th printing; and The Original African Heritage Study Bible (Winston Publishing Company, 1993).

Felder held Doctor of Philosophy and Master of Philosophy degrees in biblical languages and literature from Columbia University in New York; a Master of Divinity degree from Union Theological Seminary in New York; a Diploma of Theology from Mansfield College at the University of Oxford in England; a Bachelor of Arts degree in philosophy, Greek, and Latin from Howard University in Washington, D.C. He received his secondary education at the Boston Latin School.

Felder died on October 1, 2019, at his Mobile, Alabama, at the age of 76.

== Selected works ==
=== Thesis ===
- Felder, Cain Hope (1982). Wisdom, law and social concern in the Epistle of James (Ph.D.). Columbia University. OCLC 9592965.

=== Books ===
- ——— (1989). Troubling Biblical Waters: Race, Class, and Family. Bishop Henry McNeal Turner studies in North American Black religion. Vol. 3. Maryknoll, NY: Orbis Books. ISBN 9780883445358. OCLC 18983550.
- ——— (1991). Stony the Road We Trod: African American biblical interpretation. Minneapolis: Fortress Press. ISBN 9780800625016. OCLC 23766878.
- ——— (1993). The Original African Heritage Study Bible: King James Version: with special annotations relative to the African/Edenic perspective. Nashville, TN: Winston Publishing Company. ISBN 9781555236748. OCLC 312468327.
- ——— (2002). Race, racism, and the biblical narratives. Facets. Minneapolis: Fortress Press. ISBN 9780800635787. OCLC 50912494.

=== Edited by ===
- ———; Blount, Brian K.; Martin, Clarice J.; Powery, Emerson B., eds. (2007). True to Our Native Land: an African American New Testament commentary. Minneapolis: Augsburg Fortress. ISBN 9780800634216. OCLC 84152841.
