= Cheryl A. Kirk-Duggan =

American womanist theologian, professor, author and poet

Rev. Dr. Cheryl Kirk-Duggan
- Born: July 24, 1951
- Occupations: academic, writer, theologian
- Known for: womanist theology
- Title: Professor of Religion and Director of Women's Studies

Academic background
- Education: Ph.D.
- Alma mater: Baylor University

Cheryl A. Kirk-Duggan (born 24 July 1951) is an African-American womanist theologian, professor, author, poet, and an elder in the Christian Methodist Episcopal Church. She is Professor Emerita of Religion and Women's Studies and Director of Women's Studies at Shaw University Divinity School. She is the author or editor of numerous books, including the volume Women and Christianity in a series on Women and Religion in the World, published by Praeger.

== Biography ==
Cheryl A. Kirk-Duggan grew up in Louisiana. She graduated magna cum laude from the University of Southwestern Louisiana. She then studied voice and earned a Master of Music at the University of Texas at Austin. After graduation, she moved to New York to pursue a career in music, and she performed at Carnegie Hall. She later returned to Texas with her husband, the late Hon. Mike Kirk-Duggan.

Kirk-Duggan earned a Master of Divinity degree from Austin Presbyterian Theological Seminary. She graduated with a PhD. in Theology/Ethics from Baylor in 1992. She is an ordained elder in the Christian Methodist Episcopal Church.

From 1997 to 2004, she was the director of the Center for Women and Religion at the Pacific School of Religion, in Berkeley, California. She joined the faculty at Shaw University Divinity School in 2004, where she continues to teach. She is professor emerita of religion and director of women's studies. In 2019–2020, she was the Crump Visiting Scholar and Black Religious Scholars Group Scholar-in-Residence at Seminary of the Southwest.

== Scholarly work ==
Kirk-Duggan has contributed to the development of womanist theology through her writing and teaching. She has particularly focused on using a womanist lens to discuss theology and violence. In 1997, she authored Exorcizing Evil: a Womanist Perspective on the Spirituals. Among other titles, she published A Refiner's Fire: A Religious Engagement with Violence in 2001, and Violence and Theology in 2006.

Kirk-Duggan contributed the essay on "Womanist Theology as a Corrective to African American Theology" in The Oxford Handbook of African American Theology. She has also authored the essay on "Sacred and Secular in African American Music" in the Oxford Handbook of Religion and the Arts.

In 2011, she co-authored, with Marlon Hall, Wake Up: Hip-Hop, Christianity, and the Black Church. The authors provided historical review of the development of hip-hop music and culture, and questioned why churches resist incorporating this music form in worship settings. According to Monika Seweryn, writing for The Christian Librarian, "the writers try to inspire readers to embrace this hip-hop-'filled' youth and give them a venue to express their pain, irritation, desires through their own venue, hip hop."

Kirk-Duggan co-edited, with Karen Jo Torjesen, the volume Women and Christianity in the book series on "Women and Religion in the World," published by Praeger. A. Brenda Anderson, writing a review for the Journal of the American Academy of Religion, notes, "The great merit of Women & Christianity is the editors' ability to weave the diverse voices—the critiques as well as the hopes—from their numerous Christian feminist networks into a cohesive academic analysis without losing the uniqueness and fluidity of personal circumstances."

== Poetry ==
Kirk-Duggan is a poet, and has two books of poems published. The first, It's in the Blood: A Trilogy of Poetry Harvested from a Family Tree, was co-authored with Dedurie V. Kirk and Alice Kirk-Blackburn. She then published a full volume of her own poetry, entitled Baptized Rage, Transformed Grief: I Got Through, So Can You.

== Awards ==
In 2011, Kirk-Duggan won the YWCA Academy of Women Award in education.

In 2013, she won the Mentor Award from the Committee on the Status of Women in the Profession at the Society for Biblical Literature.
