= The Cross and the Lynching Tree =

2011 book by James Cone

- Author: James H. Cone
- Language: English
- Genre: Christian literature
- Published: 2011
- Publisher: Orbis Books
- Publication place: United States of America
- Pages: 202
- ISBN: 978-1-6083-3001-0
- OCLC: 1247903197
- Website: Archived December 1, 2021, at the Wayback Machine

The Cross and the Lynching Tree is a book about black liberation theology written by James H. Cone.

== Background ==
James H. Cone begins the book by providing a history of lynching in the United States and its impacts on black lives. Cone criticizes white clergy and academics for not making a connection between the crucifixion of Jesus and the black experience of lynching in the United States. Cone further criticizes the white church for actively participating in the lynching of black people throughout the 19th and 20th century. The second chapter of the book criticizes Reinhold Niebuhr for not speaking out against racism and lynching in the United States. The third chapter discusses Martin Luther King Jr. and his influence on Cone's work.

The book was published in 2011.

== Reception ==
=== Awards ===
Award	Date	Category	Result	Ref.
Nautilus Book Awards	2011	Religion / Spirituality – Western	Silver	
Independent Publisher Book Awards	2011	Religion	Gold	
Grawemeyer Award	2018	Religion	Won	

== See also ==
- Bibliography of Black theology
