= Cheryl Townsend Gilkes =

American sociologist and preacher

- Occupations: John D. MacArthur and Catherine T. MacArthur Professor of Sociology and African-American Studies at Colby College & assistant pastor for special projects at Union Baptist Church
- Known for: womanist theology

Academic background
- Education: Northeastern University (BA, MA, Ph.D)

Academic work
- Discipline: Sociology & African-American Studies
- Notable works: If It Wasn't for the Women: Black Women's Experience and Womanist Culture in Church and Community.

Cheryl Townsend Gilkes (born 1947) is an American sociologist, womanist scholar, college professor, and ordained Baptist minister.

== Biography ==
Cheryl Townsend was born on November 2, 1947, in Boston, Massachusetts. She is the daughter of Murray Luke Townsend Jr. and Evelyn Townsend (née Reid). In 1968, she married Carlton I. Gikes. They were married for three years and divorced in 1971.

Gilkes earned three degrees in sociology from Northeastern University, in Boston. She completed a Bachelor of Arts in 1970, a Master of Arts in 1973, and then earned her Ph.D. in 1979. From 1978 to 1987, she taught sociology at Boston University as an assistant professor. From 1981 to 1982, she was a research assistant at the Women's Studies in Religion Program at Harvard University.

In 1987, she joined the faculty at Colby College, where she is the John D. and Catherine T. MacArthur Professor of Sociology and African-American Studies. She also heads the African American Studies program.

An ordained minister, Gilkes serves as the assistant pastor for special projects at Union Baptist Church in Cambridge, Massachusetts.

== Works ==
- If It Wasn't for the Women: Black Women's Experience and Womanist Culture in Church and Community. Orbis Books, 2001.

== See also ==
- Womanist Theology
