= Traci C. West =

American scholar & activist

Traci C. West is a scholar and activist. She is the James W. Pearsall Professor of Christian Ethics and African American Studies at Drew University Theological School and Professor Extraorinarius in the Institute for Gender Studies in the College of Human Sciences at the University of South Africa. She is the author of numerous articles on gender, racial, and sexuality justice. Her notable books include Solidarity and Defiant Spirituality: Africana Lessons on Religion, Racism, and Ending Gender Violence (New York University Press, 2019), Disruptive Christian Ethics: When Racism and Women's Lives Matter (Westminster John Knox Press, 2006), Our Family Values: Same-sex Marriage and Religion, editor (Praeger Publishers, 2006), and Wounds of the Spirit: Black Women, Violence, and Resistance Ethics (New York University Press, 1999). She is an ordained elder in the New York Annual Conference of the United Methodist Church (UMC). Her scholarship and activism centers the voices of Queer, Transgender, and People of Color in the struggle for LGBTQIA equality in churches. She testified before the New Jersey state legislature in support of marriage equality and protested on behalf of LGBTQIA equality at the General Conference of the United Methodist Church. West is outspoken against intimate partner violence against black women and coined the term "victim-survivor" in Wounds of the Spirit. She was featured in "No!" a documentary film on sexual violence against black women.

West has received numerous awards, most recently the UMC New York Annual Conference Methodist Federation for Social Action Gwen and C. Dale White Social Justice Award; Auburn Seminary’s inaugural Walter Wink Scholar-Activist award, and CONNECT: Safe Families Peaceful Communities Peace and Justice award.
