= Emilie Townes =

The Reverend Doctor Emilie Townes
- Born: August 1, 1955 (age 71); Durham, North Carolina, U.S.
- Occupations: author, professor, theologian, American Baptist minister

Academic background
- Education: University of Chicago (BA); University of Chicago (MA, DMin); Garrett-Evangelical Theological Seminary & Northwestern University (PhD)

Academic work
- Discipline: Womanist theologian
- Institutions: Union Theological Seminary, Yale Divinity School, Vanderbilt Divinity School

Emilie Maureen Townes (born August 1, 1955, Durham, North Carolina) is an American Christian social ethicist and theologian. She was Dean, E. Rhodes, and Leona B. Carpenter Professor of Womanist Ethics and Society at the Vanderbilt University Divinity School. Townes was the first African-American woman to be elected president of the American Academy of Religion in 2008. She also served as the president of the Society for the Study of Black Religion from 2012–2016 and the president of the Society of Christian Ethics from 2024-25.

== Education and career ==
Townes earned her Bachelor of Arts in Religion and the Humanities from the University of Chicago in 1977. She then earned her Master of Arts in Religion as well as her Doctor of Ministry from the University of Chicago Divinity School in 1979 and 1982. Townes earned her Doctor of Philosophy in Religious and Theological Studies from the joint Garrett-Evangelical Theological Seminary/Northwestern University Program in 1989.

Townes has taught at a number of academic institutions, including Chicago Theological Seminary, McCormick Theological Seminary, Garrett-Evangelical Theological Seminary, DePaul University, Saint Paul School of Theology, Union Theological Seminary in New York, Yale Divinity School, and Boston University School of Theology, holding named chairs at both Union and Yale. In 2013 she became Dean of Vanderbilt Divinity School, and in 2018 she was reappointed for a second five-year term. In 2022 Townes announced that she would conclude her deanship at Vanderbilt Divinity School at the end of the 2022–2023 academic year. Her accomplishments as Dean include the launching of the James Lawson Institute for the Research and Study of Nonviolent Movements, the Public Theology and Racial Justice Collaborative, and the Wendland-Cook Program in Religion and Justice, as well as curriculum reform and building renovations. In 2024, Townes accepted a position at Boston University School of Theology as Martin Luther King, Jr. Professor of Religion and Black Studies.

Townes has been an ordained American Baptist minister since 1980.

Townes has made major contributions to the field of womanist theology and ethics. She has been described as a "towering figure in theological education." The connection between faith and activism is a hallmark of her scholarship. Her research interests include health, interlocking forms of oppression, womanism, cultural studies, and postmodernism. She was awarded an honorary master's degree from Yale University in 2005, and an honorary Doctor of Humane Letters from Christian Theological Seminary in 2022.

Townes served as the president of the American Academy of Religion in 2008, and the president of the Society for the Study of Black Religion from 2012–2016. In 2022, Townes was elected as the 2025 president of the Society of Christian Ethics (SCE). She will become the society's first Black woman president.

== Honors ==
- Elected to American Academy of Arts and Sciences, 2009.
- Pacesetter Award from the American Association of Blacks in Higher Education, 2015.
- Inducted into the Morehouse College Martin Luther King, Jr. Board of Preachers, Sponsors and Collegium of Scholars, 2021.

== Major works ==
=== Books ===
- Womanist Ethics and the Cultural Production of Evil (Palgrave Macmillan Press, 2006).
- Breaking the Fine Rain of Death: African American Health Care and a Womanist Ethic of Care (Continuum, 1998).
- Embracing the Spirit: Womanist Perspectives on Hope, Salvation, and Transformation. (Orbis Books, 1997).
- In a Blaze of Glory: Womanist Spirituality as Social Witness (Abingdon Press, 1995).
- Womanist Justice, Womanist Hope (Scholars Press, 1993).

=== Co-edited books ===
- With Katie Geneva Cannon and Angela D. Simms: Womanist Theological Ethics: A Reader (Westminster John Knox Press, 2011)
- With Stephanie Y. Mitchem: Religion, Health, and Healing in African American Life (Praeger, 2008)
