= Delores S. Williams =

American womanist theologian (1934–2022)

- Born: November 17, 1934; Louisville, Kentucky, US
- Died: November 17, 2022 (aged 88)
- Other name: Delores Seneva Williams
- Spouse: Robert C. Williams

Academic background
- Education: Union Theological Seminary
- Thesis: A Study of the Analogous Relation Between African-American Women's Experience and Hagar's Experience (1990)
- Doctoral advisor: Tom F. Driver
- Influences: Paul Tillich; Alice Walker; Beverly Wildung Harrison

Academic work
- Discipline: Theology
- School or tradition: Womanist theology
- Institutions: Union Theological Seminary
- Notable works: Sisters in the Wilderness (1993)
- Notable ideas: Womanist theology
- Influenced: Ada María Isasi-Díaz

Delores Seneva Williams (November 17, 1934 – November 17, 2022) was an American Presbyterian theologian and professor notable for her formative role in the development of womanist theology and best known for her book Sisters in the Wilderness: The Challenge of Womanist God-Talk. Her writings use black women's experiences as epistemological sources, and she is known for her womanist critique of atonement theories. As opposed to feminist theology, predominantly practiced by white women, and black theology, predominantly practiced by black men, Williams argued that black women's experiences generate critical theological insights and questions.

Williams's 1993 book, Sisters in the Wilderness, helped establish the field of womanist theology. In it, Williams primarily develops a rereading of the biblical figure Hagar to illuminate the importance of issues of reproduction and surrogacy in black women's oppression. According to Aaron McEmrys, "Williams offers a theological response to the defilement of black women ... Womanism is an approach to ethics, theology and life rooted in the experiences of African-American women".

The term womanism was coined by a contemporary of Williams, Alice Walker, used in her 1979 short story "Coming Apart" and again in her 1983 essay collection In Search of Our Mothers' Gardens.

== Biography ==
Williams was born in Louisville, Kentucky, and grew up in the rural South in a family of Seventh-Day Adventists. She graduated from Central High School in 1950. She became part of the Presbyterian Church (USA) when she married her husband Robert, a PC (USA) minister.

Delores Williams earned her PhD in systematic theology from Union Theological Seminary, and later became the Paul Tillich Professor of Feminist Theology at Union. Her title was later changed to the Paul Tillich Professor of Theology and Culture. After retirement, she became professor emerita.

William's writings helped develop the field of Womanist Theology. In 1977, she wrote an article entitled, "Womanist Theology: Black Women's Voices", which Cheryl A. Kirk-Duggan notes as being a "seminal moment" in the development of the field. She published Sisters in the Wilderness: The Challenge of Womanist God-Talk in 1993.

Williams published many articles and chapters in books. She authored the eighth chapter of Transforming the Faiths of our Fathers: Women who Changed American Religion (2004), edited by Ann Braude.

== Womanism ==
The term womanism developed out of black feminism, and was coined by Alice Walker. In her observation, Delores S. Williams noted that womanism and black feminism are both "organically related" to white feminism; however, she observed that most white feminists led movements have usually exclude black Feminist and Womanist experiences and concerns.

While some white women advocated for more radical critiques of oppression that included race, many white women and often the most popular conceptions of feminism were centered on achieving individual and relational equality with white men as the means to eliminate sexism. For black women, it is not only that equality would include the elimination of racism and classism, something that many white feminists did not directly address, but that it would also require a redefinition of equality in the first place rather than conflating it with attaining white men's social position.

As a practice of thought, womanism intends to attend to the particularity and specificity of black women's experiences in order to cultivate methods and concepts which are adequate to their situation. The goal of the womanist movement was not only to eliminate inequalities but to assist black women in reconnecting with their roots in religion and culture and to reflect and improve on "self, community and society".

== Sisters in the Wilderness ==
In 1993, Williams published Sisters in the Wilderness: The Challenge of Womanist God-Talk. In the book, Williams uses black women's experience of struggle as a starting place for biblical analysis, and explores themes from the story of Hagar in the wilderness. She utilizes the biblical character Hagar, who was a concubine of Abraham and servant to both Abraham and his wife Sarah. Williams notes similarities between Hagar's role as handmaiden, giving birth to Ishmael when Sarah and Abraham were unable to conceive, and the role of black women in caring for white children during and after slavery. The biblical story of Hagar's ability to survive in the wilderness has resonated with many black women who have found the strength to survive and persevere through adversity by leaning on their God. In particular, Williams notes the ways Hagar's position in relation to Sarah was comparable to black women's roles as mothers, both within their own communities, and in relation to white women. She argues that the system of slavery forced enslaved mothers to take on the roles of "protecting, providing for, resisting oppression and liberating" their loved ones. Yet, like Hagar, many Black women were forced into surrogacy roles in white families, forced to produce children or take care of their master's children, and after slavery, working for low wages as laborers in the homes of white people.

In the second half of the book, Williams examines how the womanist perspective provides distinct insights to theology. Williams argues that Black women's experience has been overlooked in theology, including black liberation theology and white feminist theology, and that womanist theology, by centering black women's experience, offers an important corrective. "The issue is an understanding of biblical accounts about God that allows various communities of poor, oppressed black women and men to hear and see the doing of the good news in a way that is meaningful for their lives."

== Dialogue between womanist theologians and other liberation theologies ==
Williams supported dialogue between feminists and womanists as well as between womanists and black liberationists, Asian feminist theologians, and mujerista theologians – to achieve a greater good. While she was not naïve in believing that this alone would eradicate racism or sexism, Williams found a dialogical sharing of resources was important because "all women regardless of race or class, have developed survival strategies that have helped [them to] arrive sane at [their] present social and cultural locations".

She recognized that "there has been little to no conversations among women for the purpose of swapping stories about the nature of these survival strategies". She stated in the Journal of Feminist Studies in Religion: "we feminist-womanist women need to remember, commemorate, and lift up for ourselves and subsequent generations of women the resistance events and ideas that have birthed and kept alive women's rights struggle ... create resistant rituals that can be enacted wherever feminist and womanist meet to share survival strategies and plan attacks upon patriarchal and white supremacist mind-sets and practices in American institutional life." By sharing survival stories, new resources are developed for resistance.
