= Wilda C. Gafney =

American biblical scholar (born 1966)

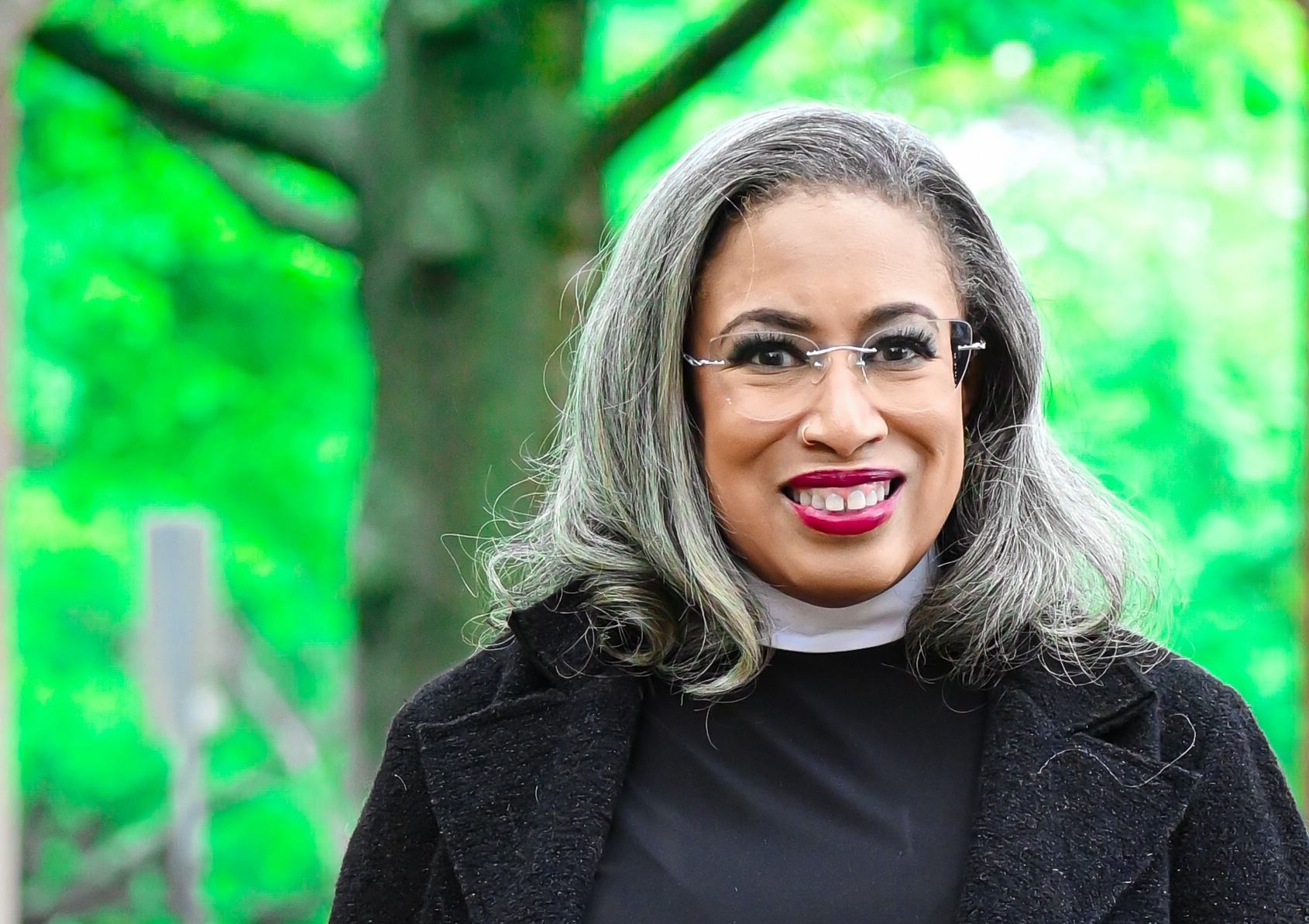
- Born: 1966 (age 59–60)
- Other name: Wil Gafney
- Occupations: Episcopal priest, professor

Academic background
- Education: Earlham College (B.A.); Howard University (M.Div.); Duke University (Ph.D.)

Academic work
- Discipline: Hebrew Bible
- Institutions: Texas Christian University
- Notable works: Daughters of Miriam: Women Prophets in Ancient Israel
- Website: https://www.wilgafney.com/

Wilda C. Gafney, also known as Wil Gafney, (born 1966) is an American biblical scholar and Episcopal priest who is the Right Rev. Sam B. Hulsey Professor of Hebrew Bible at Brite Divinity School of Texas Christian University in Fort Worth, Texas. She is specialist in womanist biblical interpretation, and topics including gender and race.

== Early life and education ==
Gafney's parents were both teachers, who divorced when she was young. She grew up attending a non-denominational church, was baptized in an African Methodist Episcopal Church, and attended a Catholic high school.

Gafney earned a BA from Earlham College, a Quaker institution, in 1987, where she was one of only seven Black students on a campus of over 1000 students. She completed a Master's of Divinity from Howard University, an historically black college, in 1997. She completed a PhD in Hebrew Bible from Duke University in 2006, where she was mentored by Roland E. Murphy. Her doctoral dissertation became her first book, Daughters of Miriam, a study of female prophets in ancient Israel.

== Career ==
Gafney is an Episcopal priest. She was a US Army Reserve chaplain and a congregational pastor in the African Methodist Episcopal Zion Church, as well as a member of Dorshei Derekh, a Reconstructionist Jewish congregation in Philadelphia.

Gafney's first teaching position was in the Lutheran Theological Seminaries at Philadelphia and at Gettysburg, beginning in 2003. In 2014, she was appointed associate professor of Hebrew Bible at Brite Divinity School at Texas Christian University. In 2018, she served on a committee that recommended that the U.S. Episcopal Church's 1979 Book of Common Prayer be changed to gender neutral language.

Gafney's research focuses on intersections between the biblical text and contemporary issues, and she has taught courses called "The Bible and Black Lives Matter", "Exodus in African American Exegesis", and "The Bible in the Public Square". She is on the editorial team for the Journal of Biblical Literature. Her book Womanist Midrash uses womanist and feminist hermeneutics to interpret passages from the Hebrew Scriptures.

From 2012 to 2013, Gafney wrote a series of articles for the Huffington Post on topics including sexual violence and civil rights. In June 2018, in response to Jeff Sessions quoting Romans 13 to defend President Donald Trump's policy of separating children from their parents at the border, Gafney wrote an article for Religion Dispatches titled "If We Did Use the Bible to Run the Country...." In September 2020, Gafney participated in "Scholar Strike", an initiative inspired by the strikes by athletes to call attention to racial injustice in the US. Gafney posted a video to the Scholar Strike YouTube page titled "White Supremacy in Biblical Interpretation." After many journalists called January 6, 2021, a "dark day", Gafney responded, "Today was not a 'dark day'. Today was a white day. One of the whitest days in American history."

== Awards and honors ==
In 2019, the Union of Black Episcopalians presented Gafney with the Anna Julia Haywood Cooper Honor Award for her scholarship and advocacy on matters of race and gender. In 2020, the Society of Biblical Literature named her one of the first two recipients of its Outstanding Mentor Award.

== Selected publications ==
=== Books ===
- Gafney, Wilda (2008). Daughters of Miriam: Women Prophets in Ancient Israel. Fortress Press. ISBN 9780800662585.
- DeYoung, Curtiss Paul; Gafney, Wilda C.; Guardiola-Saenz, Leticia; Tinker, George E.; Yamada, Frank M., eds. (2008). The Peoples' Bible. Fortress Press. ISBN 9780806656250.
- DeYoung, Curtiss Paul; Gafney, Wil; Guardiola-Saenez, Leticia A. (2010). The Peoples' Companion to the Bible. Fortress Press. ISBN 9780800697020.
- Gafney, Wilda C. (2017). Womanist Midrash: A Reintroduction to the Women of the Torah and the Throne. Presbyterian Publishing Corporation. ISBN 9780664239039.
- Gafney, Wilda C. N. (2017). Nahum, Habakkuk, Zephaniah. Wisdom Commentary. Vol. 38. Liturgical Press. ISBN 9780814681879.
- Gafney, Wilda (2021). A Women's Lectionary for the Whole Church: Year A. Church Publishing. ISBN 9781640651623.

=== Chapters and articles ===
- Gafney, Wilda CM. (2006). "A Black Feminist Approach to Biblical Studies". Encounter. 67 (4): 391.
- Gafney, Wilda (2010). "Reading the Hebrew Bible Responsibly". In Randall C. Bailey; Valerie Bridgeman; Samuel Murrell; Rodney S. Sadler Jr. (eds.). The Africana Bible: Reading Israel's Scriptures from Africa and the African Diaspora. Fortress Press. pp. 45–51. ISBN 9780800621254.
- Gafney, Wilda (2010). "Ruth". In Randall C. Bailey; Valerie Bridgeman; Samuel Murrell; Rodney S. Sadler Jr. (eds.). The Africana Bible: Reading Israel's Scriptures from Africa and the African Diaspora. Fortress Press. pp. 249–254. ISBN 9780800621254.
- Gafney, Wilda (July 2011). "A Prophet-Terrorist(a) and an Imperial Sympathizer: An Empire-Critical, Postcolonial Reading Of The No'adyah/Nechemyah Conflict". Black Theology. 9 (2): 161–176. doi:10.1558/blth.v9i2.161. S2CID 144851964.
- Gafney, Wilda (2013). "It Does Matter If You're Black or White, Too Black or Too White, but Mestizo is Just Right". In W. David Nelson; Rivka Ulmer (eds.). Re-Presenting Texts: Jewish and Black Biblical Interpretation. Gorgias Press. ISBN 9781611439243.
- Gafney, Wil (2015). "A Womanist Midrash on Zipporah". In Mitzi J. Smith (ed.). I Found God in Me: A Womanist Biblical Hermeneutics Reader. Fortress. pp. 131–157.
- Gafney, Wil (2016). "Womanist Midrash of Delilah: Don't Hate the Playa Hate the Game". In Gay L. Byron; Vanessa Lovelace (eds.). Womanist Interpretations of the Bible: Expanding the Discourse. Society of Biblical Literature. ISBN 9780884141853.
- Gafney, Wil (217). "A Reflection on the Black Lives Matter Movement and Its Impact on My Scholarship". Journal of Biblical Literature. 136 (1): 204–207. doi:10.15699/jbl.1361.2017.1363. JSTOR 10.15699/jbl.1361.2017.1363.
