= Letty M. Russell =

American feminist theologian and professor (1929-2007)

- Born: September 20, 1929; Westfield, New Jersey, U.S.
- Died: July 12, 2007 (aged 77); Guilford, Connecticut, U.S.
- Spouse: Shannon Clarkson

Ecclesiastical career
- Religion: Christianity (Presbyterian)
- Church: Presbyterian Church U.S.A.
- Ordained: 1958 in the United Presbyterian Church in the United States of America
- Congregations: Mount Morris Ascension Presbyterian Church, NY

Academic background
- Education: Wellesley College; Harvard University; Union Theological Seminary (New York City)

Academic work
- Discipline: theology
- Sub-discipline: feminist theology
- Institutions: Yale Divinity School
- Main interests: ecumenism, feminist theology
- Notable works: Feminist Interpretation of the Bible (1985), Church in the Round: Feminist Interpretation of the Church (1993)

Letty Mandeville Russell (September 20, 1929 – July 12, 2007) was a feminist theologian, professor, and prolific author. She was a member of the first class of women admitted to Harvard Divinity School, and one of the first women ordained in the United Presbyterian Church. After earning a doctorate in theology at Union Theological Seminary, she joined the faculty at Yale Divinity School, where she taught for 28 years.

Russell was a pioneer in the field of feminist theology. She authored, co-authored or edited over 17 books, including: Feminist Interpretation of the Bible (1985), Inheriting our Mothers' Garden: Feminist Theology in Third World Perspective (1988), Church in the Round: Feminist Interpretation of the Church (1993), and Dictionary of Feminist Theologies (1996). She has been described as a "prominent matriarch of contemporary feminist bible criticism." She was also active in the ecumenical movement, and worked closely with the National Council of Churches, the World Council of Churches, and the YWCA.

== Biography ==
=== Early life ===
Letty Mandeville Russell was born in Westfield, New Jersey on September 20, 1929. She was the second of three daughters born to Miriam (née Towl) and Ricketson B. Russell. Her mother gave up a professional career as a bacteriologist to care for her children; before her children were born, she worked on a floating hospital in New York during World War I. Russell's father worked as a trade-show salesman.

Russell attended Wellesley College, where she graduated with a Bachelor of Arts in biblical history and philosophy in 1951. After graduation, she taught third grade in Connecticut for one academic year. Late in 1952, Russell moved to New York to begin work as the director of Christian Education at Mount Morris-Ascension Church, one of four churches in the East Harlem Protestant Parish. She worked in Harlem until 1955, before leaving to attend seminary.

=== Parish Ministry, Harvard Divinity School and Ordination ===
In 1955, Russell was admitted to Harvard Divinity School after appealing their male-only admission policy. She was one of eight women admitted to the school that year, in a reversal of long-standing opposition to women's inclusion in the ministry preparatory program. Russell graduated summa cum laude with a Bachelor of Sacred Theology (S.T.B.) in 1958.

In 1958, Russell was the first women ordained in her presbytery in the United Presbyterian Church in the U.S.A. Only three years prior, the denomination had voted in their General Assembly to allow the ordination of women to the Word and Sacrament.

Following her ordination, Russell returned to the East Harlem Protestant Parish (EHPP) in 1958, to serve as pastor at Mount Morris-Ascension Church, where she served for the next ten years. Russell's ministry focused on leadership development with the mostly Black and Hispanic members of the congregation to become leaders in the parish and the community. Her experiences in Harlem contributed to her personal and professional commitments to marginalized communities.

=== Academic Career and Yale Divinity School ===
Returning to graduate school, Russell earned a Master of Sacred Theology (S.T.M.) from Union Theological Seminary in New York in Christian education and theology in 1967. Two years later, Russell completed her Doctor of Theology (Th.D.) in mission theology and ecumenics from Union.

In the fall of 1969, Russell began her academic career as assistant professor of Religious Studies at Manhattan College, Bronx, New York where she taught Protestant theology. She began teaching at Yale University Divinity School in 1974 where she would teach for the next 28 years, becoming one of the first openly LGBTQ faculty members at Yale Divinity School and at the university at-large. Russell began as an assistant professor of theology, and was promoted to Professor of Theology in 1985. In the 1990s, she and her partner, Shannon Clarkson, were active in the "Save the Quad" movement that prevented the demolition of Sterling Divinity Quadrangle. Russell officially retired in 2001, but she continued to teach a few courses at Yale Divinity School as an emerita professor.

=== Ecumenism ===
Russell was a leader in the ecumenical movement and she served on several units of the World Council of Churches, including the Faith and Order Commission from 1975 to 1983 and was one of the drafters of the document "Giving Account of the Hope Together" (Bangalore, India, 1978). She also worked with the National Council of Churches, including the Task Force on the Bible and Sexism; and Presbyterian Church (U.S.A.), the successor to the United Presbyterian Church in the United States of America.

Russell also served as a consultant to the U.S. Working Group on the participation of Women in the World Council of Churches and as religious consultant to the National Board of the YWCA.

=== Death ===
Russell died of cancer on July 12, 2007, in her home in Guilford, CT. She was survived by her spouse, Shannon Clarkson, an ordained minister in the United Church of Christ.

== Contribution to the field ==
=== Theology ===
Elisabeth Schüssler Fiorenza, the Krister Stendahl Professor at Harvard Divinity School, said, "She pioneered feminist theology not only in theology and ethics but also in biblical studies.... Letty was not only a great liberation theologian but also a great church-woman. She knew how to utilize the resources of church and university for nurturing a feminist movement around the world.... As a skilled organizer she worked tirelessly for wo/men and feminist liberation theology."

Nancy Richardson, a lecturer at Harvard Divinity School and university chaplain, reflected, "Letty was a foremother of feminist theology. . . . She was teaching it before it had a name."

=== Ecclesiology ===
In an introduction to a Festschrift published in Russell's honor in 1999 under the title Liberating Eschatology, fellow Yale Divinity School theologians Margaret Farley and Serene Jones called Russell's influence on contemporary theology "monumental" and wrote of her "uncanny ability to articulate a vision of the church that is radical in its feminist-liberationist critique but that nonetheless remains anchored in the historic traditions and communities of the Christian church."

In one of her last major public addresses, the annual Paul Tillich Lecture delivered at Harvard University in May 2006, Russell spoke to the role of the Church in confronting injustice. She said, "Our struggle is to overcome the fear of difference and to break the bars that keep us apart. [Others] want what we want. They want to work, they want to change the social structure. They want hospitality with justice."

=== Feminist Pedagogy ===
At Yale Divinity School, Russell's influence extended far beyond the confines of classrooms on Sterling Divinity Quadrangle. She was the inspiration behind creation of the school's international travel seminar program—now known as "The Letty Russell Travel Seminar"— under which Yale Divinity School students have traveled to countries around the globe for direct encounters with the realities of religion on the world stage, frequently in impoverished countries.

Yale Divinity School Dean Harold Attridge said that, through the travel seminar, Russell's “legacy of commitment to a universal vision of engaged theology will continue as a vital part of Yale Divinity School.”

Farley said about Russell, "She leaves a legacy of wisdom, integrity, and indomitable hope. Voices will rise from women and men throughout the world to bear witness to her gifts to them, not the least of which is her gift of faithful friendship... There is perhaps no other feminist theologian who has been more dedicated to ecumenical, interfaith, and international theological dialogue. Hers has been the influence not of imposition but of partnership. Yet her work has challenged everyone, not only because of its substance but because of her own commitment to making the world both more just and more hospitable."

=== International Feminist Scholarship ===
Throughout her career, Russell developed multiple initiatives to facilitate dialogue among feminist scholars, particularly scholars from traditionally under-represented communities. She was on the World Council of Churches steering group that developed the program Being Church: Women's Voices and Visions, which held a series of regional discussions on feminist ecclesiology between 2000 and 2005.

She was instrumental in establishing the Doctor of Ministries in Feminist Theologies Programme, which is a joint theological education programme between the World Council of Churches and San Francisco Theological Seminary, USA. Russell described the goal of this program as empowering women "from countries of the South as they become leaders in their communities and therefore subjects of their own theology and history."

A global advocate for women, Russell was a member of the Yale Divinity School Women's Initiative on Gender, Faith, and Responses to HIV/AIDS in Africa and was co-coordinator of the International Feminist Doctor of Ministry Program at San Francisco Theological Seminary.

M. Shawn Copeland, an American scholar and associate professor of systematic theology at Boston College, said, "Letty Russell has been the towering feminist theologian of her generation. She devoted her theological career to making it possible for women in various parts of the world to do theology, to dialogue and to collaborate with one another, and with all women and men of good will in mending creation. The seeds she has sown have flowered and will bear fruit for years to come.”

=== The Letty Russell and Shannon Clarkson '78 M.Div. Endowed Divinity Scholarship Fund ===
In March 2022, Yale Divinity School announced the establishment of The Letty Russell and Shannon Clarkson '78 M.Div. Endowed Divinity Scholarship Fund by donor Wilma Reichard. The scholarship constitutes "an expression of [Reichard's] gratitude for the contributions of Letty Russell, Professor of Liberation Theology at YDS, and her wife, Shannon Clarkson." Reflecting on the scholarship, Clarkson shared, "“Letty would be thrilled to know that funds were being raised for student scholarships. When she was in seminary at Harvard, she had a small apartment with two other friends. She had a board she used in the bathtub for her typewriter as they had so little space.”

== Awards ==
- Emmavail Luce Severinghaus Award, Wellesley College, 1986 (for Work in Religion)
- Rabbi Martin Katzenstein Award, Harvard Divinity School, 1998 (distinguished alumna award)
- Woman of Faith Award, Presbyterian Church (U.S.A.), 1999
- Unitas Distinguished Alumnae, Union Theological Seminary (New York City), 1999

== Works ==
- Human Liberation in a Feminist Perspective - A Theology (1974) ISBN 978-0664249915
- The Liberating Word: A Guide to Nonsexist Interpretation of the Bible (1977) ISBN 978-0664247515
- The Future of Partnership (1979) ISBN 978-0664242404
- Growth in Partnership (1981) ISBN 978-0664243784
- Becoming Human (1982) ISBN 978-0664244088
- Changing Contexts of Our Faith (1985) ISBN 978-0800618629
- Feminist Interpretation of the Bible (1985) ISBN 978-0664246396
- Household of Freedom: Authority in Feminist Theology (1987) ISBN 978-0664240172
- Inheriting Our Mothers' Gardens: Feminist Theology in Third World Perspective (1988) ISBN 978-0664250195
- The Church with AIDS: Renewal in the Midst of Crisis (1990) ISBN 978-0664251116
- Church in the Round: Feminist Interpretation of the Church (1993) ISBN 978-0664250706
- Dictionary of Feminist Theologies (1996) ISBN 978-0664220587
- Hagar, Sarah and Their Children: Jewish, Christian and Muslim Perspectives (2006) ISBN 978-0664229825
- Just Hospitality: God's Welcome in a World of Difference (2009) ISBN 978-0664233150
