= In Search of Our Mothers' Gardens =

Book by Alice Walker

In Search of Our Mothers' Gardens: Womanist Prose
- First edition
- Author: Alice Walker
- Language: English
- Genre: Essays
- Publisher: Harcourt Brace Jovanovich
- Publication date: 1983
- Publication place: United States
- Media type: Print (Paperback)
- Pages: 418
- ISBN: 0-15-602864-6
- OCLC: 55112154
- Dewey Decimal: 818/.5409 19
- LC Class: PS3573.A425 Z467 2004

Published in 1983, In Search of Our Mothers' Gardens: Womanist Prose is a collection composed of 36 separate pieces written by Alice Walker. The essays, articles, reviews, statements, and speeches were written between 1966 and 1982. Many are based on her understanding of "womanist" theory. Walker defines "womanist" at the beginning of the collection as "A black feminist or feminist of color. From the black folk expression of mother to female children and also a woman who loves other women, sexually and/or nonsexually. Appreciates and prefers women's culture. Committed to survival and wholeness of entire people, male and female. Womanist is to feminist as purple is to lavender."

In addition to writing about womanhood and creativity, Walker addresses subjects such as nuclear weapons, antisemitism, and the civil rights movement. In a 1984 review of the collection, Lynn Munro noted that: "Reading these essays not only gives one a clearer sense of Alice Walker but also countless insights into the men and women who have touched her life." As Munro put it, Walker "captures the voices of unsung heroines" with whom she has crossed paths.

== Part I ==
Essays in In Search of Our Mothers' Gardens Part I:

- "Saving the Life That Is Your Own: The Importance of Models in the Artist's Life"
- "The Black Writer and the Southern Experience"
- "But Yet and Still the Cotton Gin Kept on Working…"
- "A Talk: Convocation 1972"
- "Beyond the Peacock: The Reconstruction of Flannery O'Connor"
- "The Divided Life of Jean Toomer"
- "A Writer Because of, Not in Spite of, Her Children"
- "Gifts of Power: The Writings of Rebecca Jackson"
- "Zora Neale Hurston: A Cautionary Tale and a Partisan View"
- "Looking for Zora"
- "Bash the Whites"

Within these essays, She speaks about her search for early black writers such as Rebecca Jackson. She speaks of unsung heroines whom she has come into contact with who wish to tell their stories; for example Mrs. Winson Hudson. Hudson, the director of a Headstart center, wished to tell her story so that people would know "the agitation she caused in her community…was not for herself or for any one group but for everybody in the county". However, of all the writers she introduces, Zora Neale Hurston becomes a focal part in this section of essays.

As Walker begins to research the practice of voodoo by rural Southern blacks in the thirties, she becomes aware of Hurston's works. Other than white anthropologists with racist views, Walker finds no one other than Hurston studied voodoo extensively. Hurston's book Mules and Men, a collection of folklore, sparks Walker's interest immediately because it provides all the stories that Southern blacks "had forgotten or of which they had grown ashamed…and showed how marvelous, and, indeed, priceless, they are". In her essay, "Looking for Zora," Walker speaks about her trip to Hurston's hometown of Eatonville, Florida, to discover the life of her ancestral teacher. Despite Hurston's notoriety, when she died in 1959, she was buried in an "unmarked grave in a segregated cemetery". When Walker arrives in Florida, she purchases a tombstone that reads: "Zora Neale Hurston 'A Genius of the South' Novelist, Folklorist, Anthropologist 1901-1960". The line "a genius of the South" comes from a poem by Jean Toomer, whom Walker applauds for his "sensitivity to women and his ultimate condescension toward them". Walker's exploration for the black writers of the past connects to her search for the kind of books that are underrepresented in American literature. She confirms this based on her referral to a comment by Toni Morrison: When Toni Morrison said she writes the kind of books she wants to read, she was acknowledging the fact that in a society in which 'accepted literature' is so often sexist and racist and otherwise irrelevant or offensive to so many lives, she must do the work of two. She said she must be her own model as well as the artist attending, creating, learning from, realizing the model, which is to say, herself. Walker's search for 'models' is an attempt to "capture the voices" of writers who are often overlooked and/or forgotten such as Zora Neale Hurston.

== Part II ==
In Part II of In Search of Our Mother's Gardens Alice Walker focuses on the Civil Rights Movement and the important leaders who made contributions to it. Through these essays, she also exemplifies how important the Civil Rights Movements' aims were for African Americans. Part Two includes the following essays:

- "The Civil Rights Movement: What Good Was it?"
- "The Unglamorous but Worthwhile Duties of the Black Revolutionary Artist, or of the Black Writer Who Simply Works and Writes"
- "My Father's Country is Poor"
- "Making the Moves and the Movies We Want"
- "Good Morning, Revolution:Uncollected Writings of Social Protest"
- "Choice: A tribute to Dr. Martin Luther King Jr."
- "Coretta King: Revisted"
- "Choosing to Stay at Home: Ten Years after the March on Washington"
- "Lulls"
- "Recording the Season"
- "The Almost Year"

In many of these essays Walker describes her involvement in the Civil Rights Movement and explores the positives and negatives of the Civil Rights Movement's purpose. At the time of Civil Rights, Walker comprehends that she needs to make a change. She commences to take action by visiting several homes and handing out registration ballots so the privileged and underprivileged could vote. She met a Jewish law student named Mel Leventhal, who gave her inspiration to write "The Civil Rights Movement: What Good Was it?." Many people believed that Civil Rights Movement was dead. Alice Walker points out that if it is dead, she will explain why she believes that it is not. For many African Americans, the Civil Rights Movement gave them a sense of hope and freedom. She shows that whites would see the Civil Rights Movement as being dead because they did not have to go through the struggles and sacrifices that African-Americans had to encounter. They did not have to show interest because this movement was intended to help African-Americans to be equal and get the same rights as white people. White people already had the rights that the law granted and African Americans were still fighting for it. Besides that she points out that other ethnicities were unable to understand the significance behind the Civil Rights Movement and its importance for African Americans.

Of the Civil Rights Movement, Walker says, "It gave us history and men far greater than presidents. It gave us heroes. Selfless men of courage and strength, for our little boys and girls to follow. It gave us hope for tomorrow. It called us to life. Because we live, it can never die". "Choice: A Tribute to Dr. Luther King Jr." emphasizes how much passion and respect Walker has for Dr. King. In this particular essay, she speaks from a restaurant that refused to serve African Americans in 1972. Walker is able to learn from Dr. King's experience because as an African American, she had to endure those same struggles. Walker's mother taught her and her siblings to embrace their culture but at the same time to move up north to escape the harsh realities of the South. Walker and her mother were present for Dr. King's infamous speech. Ultimately, this changes Walker's perspective on racism and the effects of the Civil Rights Movement within the African-American community. Dr. King's example greatly inspires Walker's viewpoint of how she sees the South.

The backlash of racial tension between blacks and whites were extreme. Dr. King was seen as a savior for the African-American community. Walker recalls, "He gave us continuity of place, without which community is ephemeral. He gave us home". Due to her great admiration for Dr. King, she returns to the South to empower African-American communities.

In "The Almost Year", Alice Walker explains how the author Florence Randall explains how she wants blacks and whites to embrace one another. She clarifies that "she seeks to find a way in which black abused and poor and white privileged and rich can meet and exchange some warmth of themselves. Walker's perspective is that if both blacks and whites can stop the racial equality that blacks and whites will not be divided. In this house, a black girl feels somewhat threatened being an all-white household. Due to these circumstances, Walker provides a sense of division between the black girl and the family that is providing a home for her to feel free. The black girl cannot embrace the warmth from the Mallory's family because she feels that all white people are to hurt black people. Walker explains how the Civil Rights Movement intended to bring both blacks and whites together. Walker wants to show how a black girl should not have to feel unequal when they are around white people.

Moreover, in "Coretta King: Revisited," Alice Walker describes an interview with Coretta Scott King. Walker presents her as more than a mother and wife; she is similar to her husband, and is making a conscientious effort to fight for equality and civil liberties for African Americans. Walker sees strength in King, a woman who just lost her husband due to the acts of violence from others. Walker finds it difficult to understand how a woman, who just lost a loved one to the brutality, could continue in the battle for Civil Rights. Walker praises the fact that Coretta Scott King did not just sit back but took actions to help with different campaigns. Walker converses with her on about "black people in power and the whites who work with them" and Ms. King says, "I don't believe that black people are going to misuse power in the way it has been misused. I think they've learned from their experiences. And we've seen instances where black and white work together effectively".

== Part III ==
Part Three of In Search of Our Mothers' Gardens includes the following essays:

- "In Search of Our Mothers' Gardens"
- "From an Interview"
- "A Letter to the Editor of Ms."
- "Breaking Chains and Encouraging Life"
- "If the Present Looks Like the Past, What Does the Future Look Like?"
- "Looking to the Side, and Back"
- "To The Black Scholar"
- "Brothers and Sisters"

In part three, Walker addresses black women coping with self-worth and self-respect. It offers encouragement to future generations of Black men and women. Walker begins part III with a poem by Marilou Awiakta, also known as "Motheroot". In this section of the collection Walker is on a mental journey seeking ways to uplift the Black race. Along this exploration she uses literature of other Black poets and writers to gain a deeper insight on Black women in their era, which assisted Walker in understanding society in her era.

In the opening of "In Search of Our Mothers' Gardens", Walker quotes from Jean Toomer's Cane, taking note that in early literature by black men, black women were seen has hopeless and characterized as mere sex objects. "I asked her to hope, and build up an inner life against the coming of that day…I sang, with a strange quiver in my voice, a promise song." The focus of this essay is on that of the Black women throughout history who have created masterpieces from the scraps they were afforded. Black women's potential for creative freedom is stifled by their position in society that places a series of tropes and caricatures onto their being, operating to delegitimize the work they produce. Walker says black women did not have the opportunity to pursue their dreams because they were given the main responsibility of raising children, obeying their husbands, and maintaining the household: "Or was she required to bake biscuits for a lazy backwater tramp, when she cried out in her soul to paint watercolors of sunsets, or the rain falling on the green and peaceful pasturelands? Or was her body broken and forced to bear children." Walker personalizes these women by referring to them as "our mothers and grandmothers".

Toomer felt that black women were unhappy and felt unloved. Both Walker and Toomer felt that black women were not allowed to dream, yet alone pursue them. "They were Creators, who lived lives of spiritual waste, because they were so rich in spirituality, which is the basis of art, that the strain of enduring their unused and unwanted talent drove them insane". Walker proceeds in saying how oppression has caused many talented black women to go unnoticed or unheard of. Walker cites Bessie Smith, Billie Holiday, Nina Simone, Roberta Flack, and Aretha Franklin to note talent lost among the black race and culture.

Additionally, Walker refers to Virginia Woolf's, A Room of One's Own and writer Phillis Wheatley; Walker compares both artists conveying that all of Woolf's fears were Wheatley's reality; due to restraints all of Woolf's goals were unachievable for Wheatley. Woolf writes, "any woman born with a great gift in the sixteenth century would certainly have gone crazed, shot herself, or ended her days in some lonely cottage outside the village, half witch, half wizard, feared and mocked at. For it needs little skill and psychology to be sure that a highly gifted girl who had tried to use her gift for poetry would have been so thwarted and hindered by contrary instincts, that she must have lost her health and sanity to a certainty." Wheatley experienced everything Woolf dreaded, although Wheatley was granted limited freedom of expression and education by her owners. Walker focuses on the phrase, "contrary instincts" used by Woolf, believing that this what Wheatley felt since she was taught that her origin was an untamed and inadequate culture and race. In Wheatley's poetry she describes a "goddess", which Walker perceives as her owner, whom Wheatley appreciates although she was enslaved by this person. Walker pays tribute to Wheatley when she writes, "But at last Phillis, we understand. No more snickering when your stiff, struggling, ambivalent lines are forced on us. We know now that you were not an idiot or a traitor".

According to Walker, society viewed Black women as, "the mule of the world", this caused black women to become emotionless and hopeless. Further, in the essay Walker gives a personal account of her own mother, "And yet, it is to my mother-and all our mothers who were not famous-that I went in search of the secret if what has fed that muzzled and often mutilated, but vibrant, creative spirit that the black woman has inherited, and that pops out in wild and unlikely places to this day". Walker describes her mother's simple, but appreciated talent of gardening. For Walker, her mother's ability to continue gardening despite her poor living conditions portrays her mother's strong persona and ability to strive even in hardship. "She spent the summers canning vegetables and fruits. She spent the winter evenings making quilts enough to cover all our beds. There was a never a moment for her to sit down, undisturbed, to unravel her own private thoughts; never a time free from interruption-by work or the noisy inquiries of children. The theme and idea of legacy reoccurs towards the end of the essay. Walker describes, the legacy of her mother, "Her face, as she prepares the Art that is her gift is a legacy of respect she leaves to me, for all that illuminates and cherishes life". Walker reveals how she has found and understood herself, while researching her heritage.

"From An Interview" gives readers a deeper insight on Walker's personal struggle with self-worth. Walker extensively reveals her inner conflicts and the imperative events in her life that has made her the person she is. Walker refers to herself as a "solitary" person from as early as her childhood. Walker discloses that she was teased as a child due to her disfigurement, which made her feel worthless and later on as a college student she began to seriously contemplate suicide. Walker says, "That year I made myself acquainted with every philosopher's position on suicide, because by that time it did not seem frightening or even odd, but only inevitable". Walker also began to lose her faith in a higher being because she felt as though her thoughts of suicide disappointed God, therefore weakening her relationship with him. Walker explains that with the help of friends and poetry she unraveled herself from this path of self-destruction. According to Walker her main release of energy is through poetry. Walker then explains her passion for poetry, "Since that time, it seems to me that all of my poems-and I write groups of poems rather than singles-are written when I have successfully pulled myself out of a completely numbing despair, and stand again in the sunlight. Writing poems is my way of celebrating with the world that I have not committed suicide the night before". Walker expresses that with her experiences she has developed a passion to help Black women who lack the self-esteem as she once did.

"If the Present Looks Like the Past, What Does the Future Look Like?" addresses the divide within the black community. In the opening of the essay Walker bluntly begins with the division among lighter and darker skinned black women. Walker speaks about how lighter women unintentionally and unknowingly offend dark skinned women when she says, "What black women would be interested in, I think, is a consciously heightened awareness on the part of light black women that they are capable, often quite unconsciously, of inflicting pain upon them; and that unless the question of Colorism– in my definition, prejudicial or preferential treatment of same-race people based solely on their color– is addressed in our communities and definitely in our black "sisterhoods" we cannot, as a people, progress. For colorism, like colonialism, sexism, and racism, impedes us". Walker encourages the two groups to be sensitive towards one another, or else progression of Black people will be haunted. Walker urges Black people to pave the way for future generations to eliminate the distress experienced by her and many others. Walker expresses this thought when she says, "…I believe in listening-to a person, the sea, the wind, the trees, but especially to young black women whose rocky road I am still traveling".

== Part IV ==
Part Four of In Search of Our Mothers' Gardens includes the following essays:

- "Silver Writes"
- "Only Justice Can Stop a Curse"
- "Nuclear Madness: What Can You Do"
- "To the Editors of Ms. Magazine"
- "Writing The Color Purple"
- "One Child of One's Own: A Meaningful Digression within the Work(s)"
- "Beauty: When the Other Dancer Is the Self"

== See also ==
- Womanism

== Sources ==
- Munro, C. Lynn (1984). "In Search of our Mothers' Gardens". Black American Literature Forum. 18 (4): 161. doi:10.2307/2904292. JSTOR 2904292. OCLC 5552663202.
- Walker, Alice. In Search of our Mothers' Gardens: Womanist Prose. New York: Harcourt Inc, 1983.
