= Kelly Brown Douglas =

African-American Episcopal theologian (born 1952)

The Very Reverend Kelly Brown Douglas
- Born: Kelly Delaine Brown; 1957 (age 68–69); Dayton, Ohio, US
- Other name: Kelly Delaine Brown Douglas
- Title: Former Dean and President Episcopal Divinity School

Ecclesiastical career
- Religion: Christianity (Anglican)
- Church: Episcopal Church (United States)
- Ordained: 1982 (deacon); 1983 (priest)
- Offices held: Canon Theologian of Washington National Cathedral (since 2017)

Academic background
- Education: Denison University; Union Theological Seminary
- Academic advisor: James H. Cone

Academic work
- Discipline: Theology
- School or tradition: Womanist theology
- Institutions: Edward Waters College; Howard University; Goucher College; Union Theological Seminary

Kelly Delaine Brown Douglas (born 1957) is an African-American Episcopal priest, womanist theologian, and former interim president of Episcopal Divinity School. She was previously the inaugural Dean of the Episcopal Divinity School at Union Theological Seminary. She became interim president when EDS departed from Union in 2023. She is also the Canon Theologian at the Washington National Cathedral. She has written seven books, including The Black Christ (1994), Black Bodies and Black Church: A Blues Slant (2012), Stand Your Ground: Black Bodies and the Justice of God (2015), and Resurrection Hope: A Future Where Black Lives Matter (2021). Her book Sexuality in the Black Church: A Womanist Perspective (1999) was groundbreaking for openly addressing homophobia within the black church.

== Biography ==
=== Early life ===
Kelly Delaine Brown was born in 1957 in Dayton, Ohio, and raised in Dayton, Ohio, in a middle-class family. Her father was a professional, and her mother stayed home to care for her children. She attended college at Denison University in Granville, Ohio, where she pursued a Bachelor of Science degree in psychology. She was active as a student leader and served on a search committee for the new president of the university in 1976. She was elected to the Phi Beta Kappa society, and graduated summa cum laude in 1979. She later served on the Denison Alumni Council.

=== Graduate education and ordination ===
Following her college graduation, Douglas moved to New York City to attend Union Theological Seminary. She graduated with a Master of Divinity (MDiv) in 1982. On September 1, 1983, she was ordained by Walter Dennis as an Episcopal priest at St. Margaret's Episcopal Church in the Episcopal Diocese of Southern Ohio. Women's ordination had been officially approved in the Episcopal Church USA in 1976, and the first woman to be ordained in the Southern Ohio Diocese was Doris Ellen Mote. Douglas was the first black woman to be ordained in the diocese and one of the first ten black women ordained in the Episcopal Church USA.

After earning her MDiv, Douglas stayed on to pursue a PhD at Union. She completed her doctorate in systematic theology in 1988, studying with James Cone, a renowned theologian and the founder of black liberation theology. At Union, she was awarded the Hudnut Award and the Julius Hanson Award, for preaching excellence and outstanding theological studies, respectively.

=== Academic career ===
At the start of her academic career, Douglas found a position as Assistant Professor of Religion at Edward Waters College in Jacksonville, Florida. However, she soon accepted an offer to teach at the Howard University School of Divinity, where she was Associate Professor of Theology from 1987 to 2001. In addition to teaching, Douglas contributed to the development of womanist theological discourse through her writings. While at Howard, she published her first two books: Black Christ, in 1993, and Sexuality and the Black Church, in 1998. Her most well known work, Sexuality and the Black Church, is considered to be the first book to openly address the issue of homophobia in the Black Church from a womanist perspective.

In 2001, Douglas left Howard to join the religion department at Goucher College, a small liberal arts college in Baltimore. As the Elizabeth Connolly Todd Distinguished Professor of Religion, and later the Susan B. Morgan Professor of Religion, she taught at Goucher for six years, and still retains professor emerita status. She continued writing and publishing, completing three additional books, as well as numerous articles and book chapters. She wrote Stand Your Ground: Black Bodies and the Justice of God in response to the death of Trayvon Martin. The book analyzes the "systemic failure to hold individuals accountable for racist aggression and murder."

In 2018, she became the inaugural dean for Episcopal Divinity School at Union Theological Seminary. She is the first African-American woman to lead a seminary affiliated with the Episcopal Church.

In 2024, she became a non-residential honorary Anglican Communion Canon at Newcastle Cathedral, being the first to do so.

=== Ecclesiastical ministry ===
Douglas served as an associate priest at the Holy Comforter Episcopal Church in Washington, DC, for two decades until 2017, when she joined the staff of the Washington National Cathedral as the Canon Theologian. In this role she helped lead discussions on current issues with the congregation, providing theological background and interpretation. In 2015, a controversy emerged over two stained glass windows in the cathedral that honored Andrew Jackson and Robert E. Lee. Douglas was part of a task force assigned to study the issue and make recommendations on what to do with the windows. In 2017, after two years of discussions among the cathedral worshipping community, the cathedral chapter voted to remove the windows.

In 2019, Douglas preached at the consecration of Kimberly Lucas as bishop of the Episcopal Diocese of Colorado. Lucas is the first woman bishop and first African-American bishop in the diocese.

== Awards ==
Douglas received the 2023 Grawemeyer Award for Religion, from the University of Louisville, for her book Resurrection Hope: A Future Where Black Lives Matter.

In 1995, Douglas received the Grace Lyman Alumnae Award by the Women's Studies Department at Denison University. In 2000, she was awarded Denison's Alumni Citation. While teaching at Goucher College, she was awarded the Goucher College Caroline Doebler Bruckerl Award.

She is also a recipient of the Anna Julia Haywood Cooper Award, given by the Union of Black Episcopalians.

Douglas has been awarded honorary doctorates from Denison University (2021), Ithaca College (2021), and General Theological Seminary (2022).

== Published works ==
- Black Christ (1993) - ISBN 9780883449394
- Sexuality and the Black Church (1998) - ISBN 978-1570752421
- What's Faith Got to Do with It: Black Bodies/Christian Souls (2005) - ISBN 9781570756092
- Black Bodies and the Black Church: A Blues Slant (2012) - ISBN 9780230116818
- Stand Your Ground: Black Bodies and the Justice of God (2015) ISBN 9781626981096
- Black Christ, 25th Anniversary Edition (2019) - ISBN 978-1626983168
- Resurrection Hope: A Future Where Black Lives Matter (2021) - ISBN 9781608339082
