= List of Nigerian writers =

This is a list of Nigerian writers.

== A ==
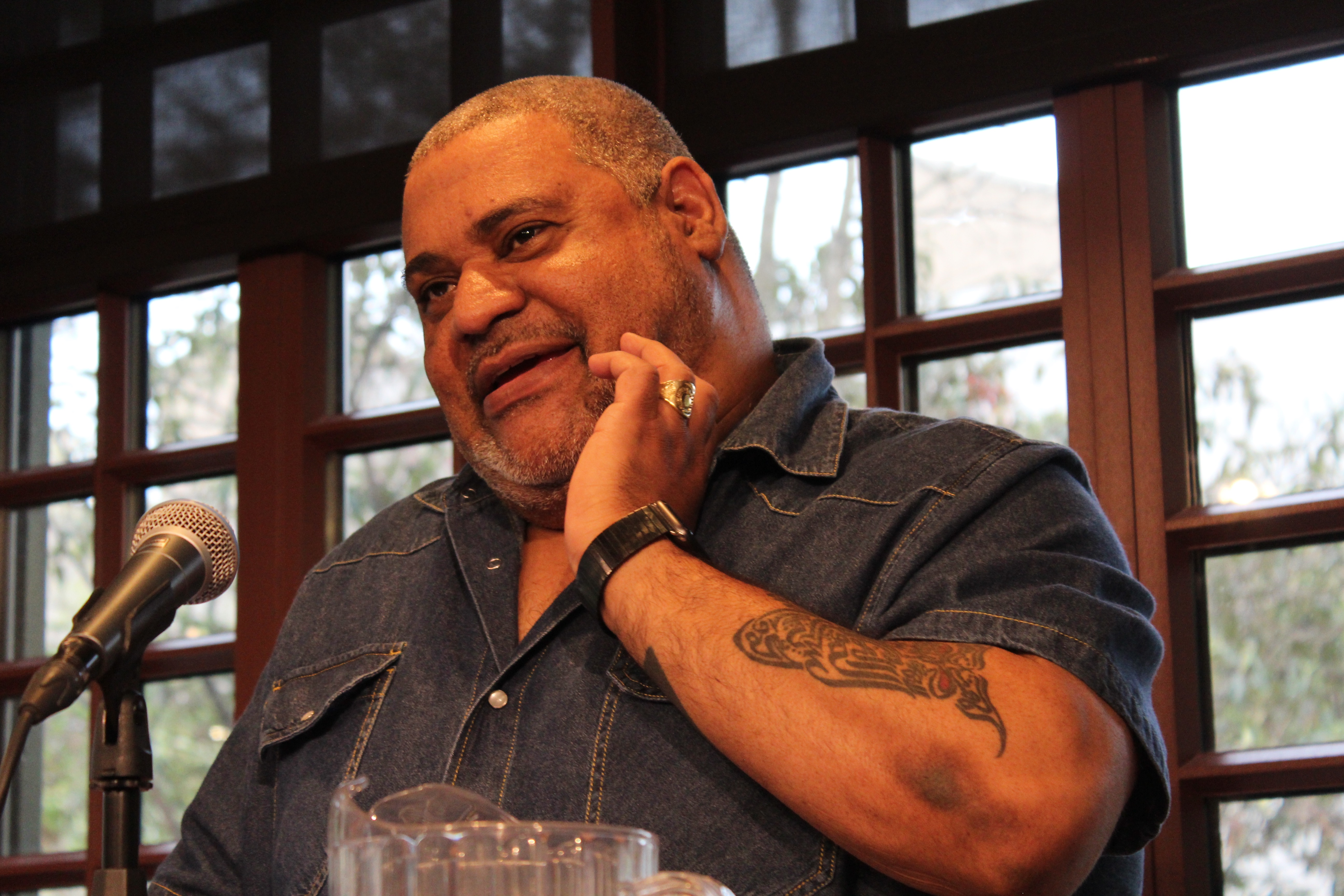
Chris Abani, 2019

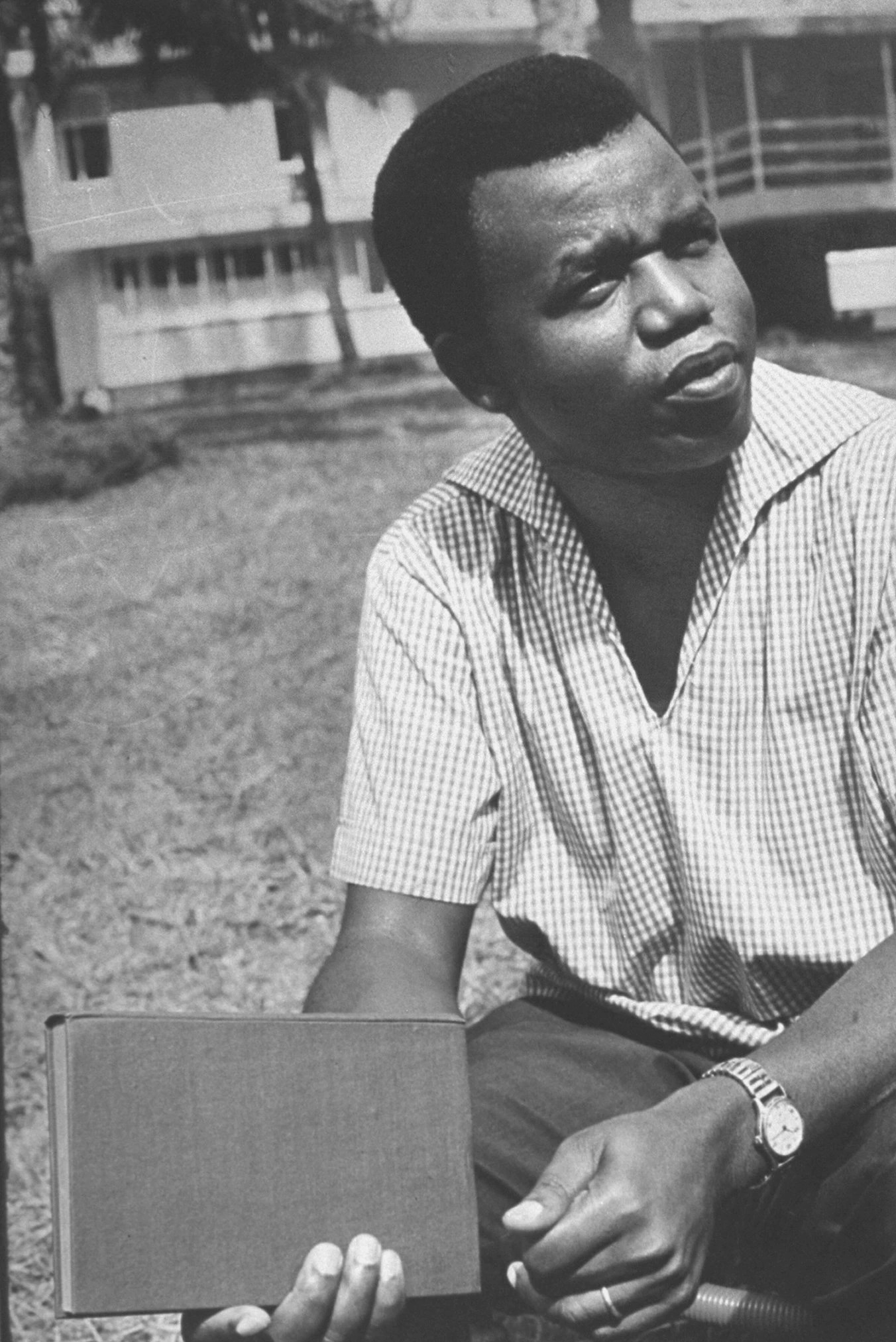
Chinua Achebe, 1966

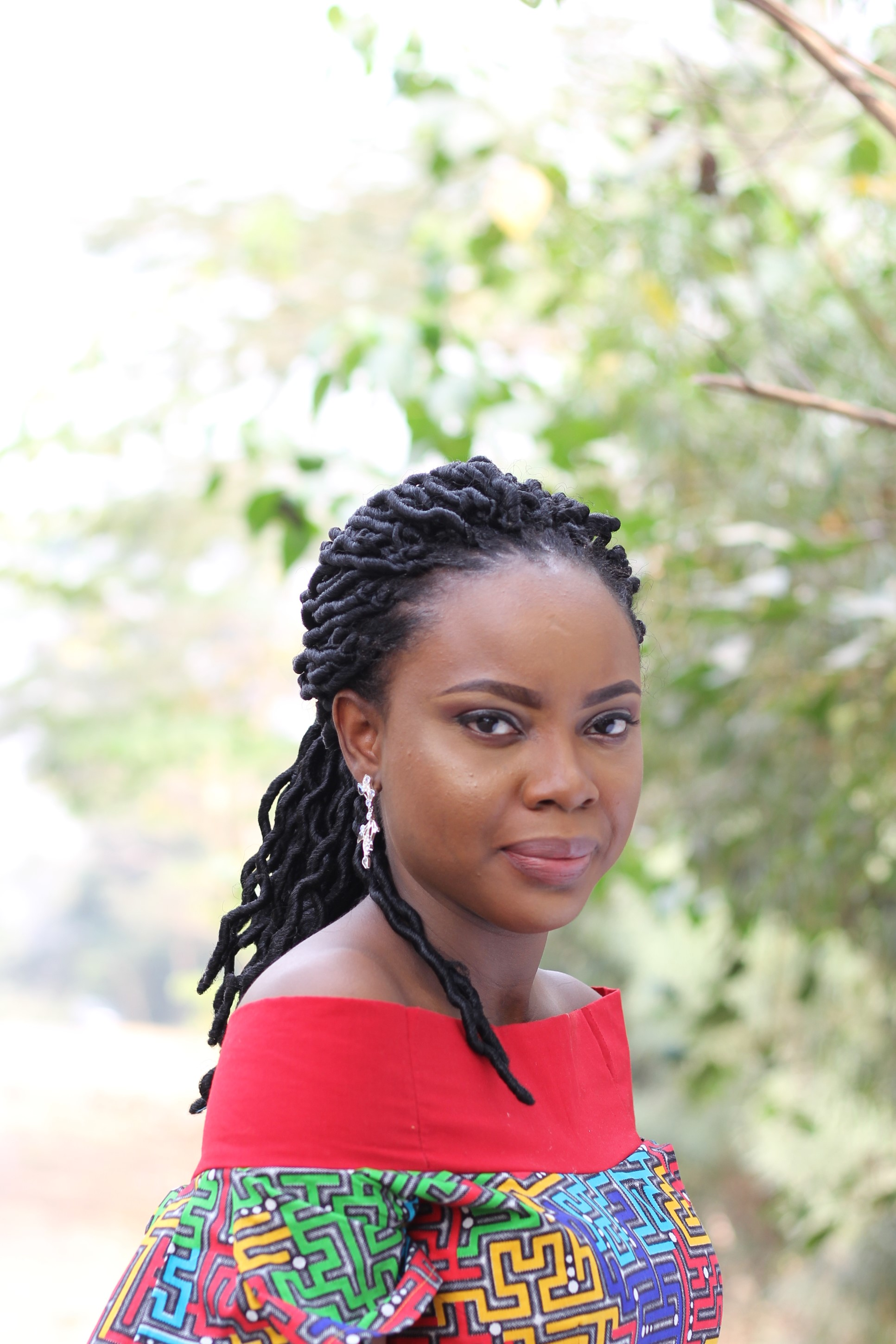
Ayobami Adebayo, 2018

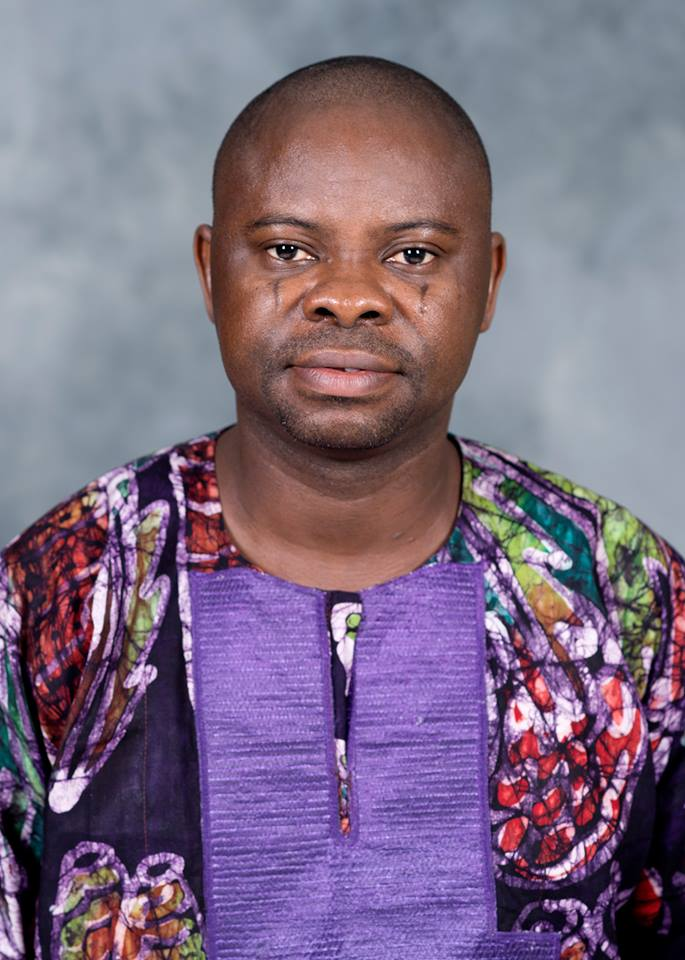
Saheed Aderinto, 2016

- Chris Abani (born 1966), novelist, playwright and poet
- Faridah Àbíké-Íyímídé (born 1998), novelist
- Chinua Achebe (1930–2013), novelist, poet and critic
- Catherine Obianuju Acholonu (1951–2014), academic
- Ayobami Adebayo (born 1988), novelist
- Remi Adedeji (born 1937), children's writer and academic editor
- Abimbola Adelakun, novelist
- Sade Adeniran, novelist and filmmaker
- Gbemisola Adeoti, poet, academic, and actor
- Saheed Aderinto (born 1979), author and academic
- Akin Adesokan, novelist and scholar
- Toyin Adewale-Gabriel (born 1969), poet
- Tomi Adeyemi (born 1993), novelist and writing coach
- Chimamanda Ngozi Adichie (born 1977), novelist and poet
- S. A. Afolabi (born 1966), novelist, short-story writer
- Adedayo Agarau (born 1994), poet and essayist
- Ifeoma Aggrey-Fynn (d. 2015), writer
- Tolu Ajayi (born 1946), poet and writer of fiction
- Tolu Akinyemi, writer, poet
- Dami Ajayi, poet, essayist
- Yemi Ajibade (1929–2013), playwright and actor
- Audrey Ajose (born 1937), journalist and juvenile fiction writer
- Uwem Akpan (born 1971), Jesuit priest and writer
- Henry Akubuiro, journalist and novelist
- Hauwa Ali (died 1995), novelist
- Akilu Aliyu (1918–1998), poet
- Zaynab Alkali (born 1950), novelist, short-story writer and academic
- T. M. Aluko (1918–2010), novelist and autobiographer
- Elechi Amadi (1934–2016), novelist
- Ifi Amadiume (born 1947), poet, anthropologist and essayist
- I. N. C. Aniebo (born 1939), writer
- Karen King-Aribisala, short-story writer, novelist and academic
- Yemisi Aribisala (born 1973), essayist and food memoirist
- Nana Asmau (1793–1864)
- Odafe Atogun, writer
- Sefi Atta (born 1964), novelist, short-story writer and playwright
- Adaeze Atuegwu (born 1977), novelist and playwright
- Theophilus Olabode Avoseh (1908–1999), historian
- Uche Azikiwe (born 1947), author
- Nnorom Azuonye (1967–2024), theatre director, playwright and poet

== B ==
- Rotimi Babatunde, playwright
- Esther Bali (born 1947), writer of folktale stories, playwright
- Biyi Bandele (1967–2022), novelist, playwright, filmmaker
- Bunmi Banjo (born 1977)
- A. Igoni Barrett (born 1979), novelist, short-story writer
- Lindsay Barrett (born 1941), poet, novelist, essayist, playwright, journalist
- Olumbe Bassir (1919–2001)
- Muhammed Bello (1781–1837)
- Philip Begho (born 1956), dramatist, short-story writer, poet
- T. J. Benson, novelist and short-story writer
- Omoseye Bolaji (1964–2022), writer of history, poetry, Islamic studies
- Natasha Bowen, novelist and teacher
- Oyinkan Braithwaite (born 1988), novelist
- Bashorun Seinde Arogbofa (born 1939), writer, author

== C ==
- Chin Ce (born 1966)
- Chinweizu (born 1943), critic, essayist, poet, journalist
- John Pepper Clark (1935–2020), poet, playwright
- Teju Cole (born 1975), novelist, essayist
- Samuel Ajayi Crowther (1807–1891), linguist, translator, diarist, explorer, writer

== D ==
- Usman dan Fodio (1754–1817), poet, political and societal theorist, law and jurisprudence writer
- Abi Dare
- Jude Dibia (born 1975)
- Antera Duke, diarist

== E ==
- Michael Echeruo (born 1937), poet, critic
- Amatoritsero (Godwin) Ede
- Chike Frankie Edozien
- Philip Effiong (1925–2003)
- Oghenechovwe Donald Ekpeki
- Cyprian Ekwensi (1921–2007), novelist, short-story writer
- Buchi Emecheta (1944–2017), novelist
- E. Nolue Emenanjo (1943–2016)
- Akwaeke Emezi (born 1987)
- Olaudah Equiano (c. 1745–97)
- Femi Euba (born 1942), dramatist
- Dickson Ekhaguere, playwright

== F ==
- Daniel Olorunfemi Fagunwa (1903–1963), novelist
- Adebayo Faleti (1930–2017)
- Toyin Falola (born 1953)
- Dan Fulani
- Bilkisu Funtuwa
- Flora Nwapa (1931–1993)

== G ==
- Godspower Oboido (born 1988), poet and essayist
- Ukawsaw Gronniosaw (1705–1775), autobiographer

== H ==
- Helon Habila (born 1967), novelist
- Obo Aba Hisanjani (born 1949), poet
- Helen Oyeyemi (born 1984), novelist

== I ==
- Abubakar Adam Ibrahim (born 1979)
- Emmanuel Iduma (born 1989), novelist, essayist, and academic
- Jordan Ifueko (born 1993), novelist
- Chukwuemeka Ike (1931–2020), monarch, academic, writer
- Nnanna Ikpo, novelist
- Ejikeme Ikwunze
- Abubakar Imam (1911–1981)
- Eghosa Imasuen (born 1976)
- Tade Ipadeola (born 1970), poet
- Akinwunmi Isola, playwright, dramatist and scholar
- Uzodinma Iweala (born 1982)
- Festus Iyayi (1947–2013)

== J ==
- John Jea (1773–?)
- Elnathan John (born 1982)
- Samuel Johnson (1846–1901)

== K ==
- Toni Kan (born 1971)
- Stephen Kekeghe (born 1982) writer and academic
- Farooq Kperogi (born 1973), author, columnist, journalism professor

== L ==
- Duro Ladipo (1931–1978)
- Logan February (born 1999)

== M ==
- Amina Mama (born 1958)
- Sarah Ladipo Manyika (born 1968), novelist, short story writer, essayist
- Oliver Mbamara
- Sebastian Okechukwu Mezu (born 1941)
- Dele Momodu (born 1960)
- John Munonye (1929–1999)

== N ==
- Nnamani Grace Odi (born 2001), writer and entrepreneur
- Niran Adedokun, novelist, journalist and columnist
- Okey Ndibe, novelist, columnist, journalist and scholar
- Echezonachukwu Nduka (born 1989), poet, classical pianist
- Uche Nduka (born 1963), poet
- Iheoma Nwachukwu poet and writer of fiction
- Martina Nwakoby (born 1937)
- Nkem Nwankwo (1936–2001), novelist, poet
- Flora Nwapa (1931–1993), novelist
- Adaobi Tricia Nwaubani (born 1976), novelist, humorist, essayist and journalist
- Onuora Nzekwu (1928–2017)
- Onyeka Nwelue (born 1988)
- Chuma Nwokolo (born 1963), writer, poet, humorist, essayist and lawyer
- Abdul Rasheed Na'Allah (born 1962), writer, poet, scholar and performer

== O ==
- Chigozie Obioma (born 1986), novelist
- Obiwu (born 1962), poet, theorist
- Moses Ochonu, academic, historian
- Ike Odimegwu
- Josephat Obi Oguejiofor
- Olu Oguibe (born 1964)
- Ike Oguine
- Molara Ogundipe (1940–2019)
- Wole Oguntokun, playwright
- Tanure Ojaide (born 1948), poet, critic
- Bayo Ojikutu (born 1971), novelist, essayist, short story writer
- Gabriel Okara (1921–2019), poet
- Chioma Okereke, novelist, poet
- Christopher Okigbo (1932–1967), poet
- Julie Okoh (born 1947), playwright
- Nnedi Okorafor (born 1974), writer of fantasy and science fiction
- Ifeoma Okoye (born 1937), novelist
- Chinelo Okparanta (born 1981), novelist and short-story writer
- Isidore Okpewho (1941–2016), novelist, critic
- Ben Okri (born 1959), poet, novelist
- Suyi Davies Okungbowa (born 1989), fantasy and science fiction author
- Afolabi Olabimtan (1932–2003)
- Olatubosun Oladapo (born 1943), poet, playwright
- Ukamaka Olisakwe (born 1982)
- Simbo Olorunfemi, poet, journalist
- Rita Omokha, journalist and author
- Kole Omotosho (1943–2023), novelist
- Kola Onadipe (1922–1988)
- Nuzo Onoh (born 1962), African horror author
- Chibundu Onuzo (born 1991)
- Osonye Tess Onwueme (born 1955)
- Nduka Onwuegbute (born 1969)
- Ifeoma Onyefulu (born 1959)
- Cheluchi Onyemelukwe-Onuobia
- Bukola Oriola (born 1976)
- Romeo Oriogun
- Dennis Osadebay (1911–1995), poet
- Femi Osofisan (born 1946)
- E. C. Osondu, short-story writer, novelist
- Ayodele Olofintuade (born 1970s), novelist
- Ifeoma Mabel Onyemelukwe (born 1950)
- Niyi Osundare (born 1947), poet, dramatist and literary critic
- Onyinye Ough
- Helen Ovbiagele (born 1944), novelist
- Charry Ada Onwu
- Oyèrónkẹ́ Oyěwùmí
- Olamidotun Votun-Obada

== R ==
- Remi Sonaiya (born 1955)
- Remi Raji (born 1961), poet, academic
- Romeo Oriogun, poet
- Ola Rotimi (1938–2000), novelist, theatre director and playwright

== S ==
- Ken Saro-Wiwa (1941–1995), playwright, novelist, poet
- Mabel Segun (1930–2025), poet, playwright
- Lola Shoneyin (born 1974), novelist, poet
- Zulu Sofola (1935–1995), playwright
- Bode Sowande (born 1948), playwright
- Wole Soyinka (born 1934), playwright, poet, novelist; Nobel laureate, (1986)
- Ibrahim Sheme (born 1968), novelist, poet, publisher

== T ==
- Amos Tutuola (1920–1997), novelist
- Kola Tubosun (born 1981), poet, essayist and linguist
- Tomi Favored (born 1987)

== U ==
- Obiora Udechukwu (born 1946), poet
- Gracy Ukala (born 1946), novelist
- Adaora Lily Ulasi (1932–2016), novelist
- Uchechukwu Peter Umezurike (born 1975), poet
- Chika Unigwe (born 1974), novelist
- Sam Ukala (1948–2021), playwright, prose fiction writer and poet

== V ==
- Mamman Jiya Vatsa (1944–1986), poet
- Jumoke Verissimo (born 1979), poet

== W ==
- Ken Wiwa (1968–2016), biographer
- Molara Wood (born 1969), short-story writer, journalist

== Y ==
- Balaraba Ramat Yakubu (born 1959), Hausa-language writer

== Z ==
- Sa'adu Zungur (1914–1958), poet and revolutionary

== See also ==
- List of African writers by country
- List of Nigerian poets
- List of Nigerian women writers
- Hausa literature
- Yoruba literature
- Igbo literature
- Efik literature
- Third Generation of Nigerian writers
