= List of Nigerian women writers =

This is a list of women writers who were born in Nigeria or whose writings are closely associated with that country.

== A ==
- Hafsat Abdulwaheed (born 1952), author, poet, writing in Hausa
- Dadasare Abdullahi (1918–1984), first female journalist from Northern Nigeria, non-fiction writer, educator
- Catherine Acholonu (1951–2014), researcher, author, playwright, socio-political activist, professor
- Ayobami Adebayo (born 1988), novelist, short story writer
- Bisi Adeleye-Fayemi (born 1963), human rights activist, non-fiction writer
- Chimamanda Ngozi Adichie (born 1977), novelist, short story writer, non-fiction writer
- Akachi Adimora-Ezeigbo
- Abimbola Alao (active since the 1990s), non-fiction writer, short story writer, translator
- Lesley Nneka Arimah (born 1983), short story writer
- Nana Asma’u (1793–1864), princess, poet, teacher
- Sefi Atta (born 1964), novelist, short story writer, playwright
- Adaeze Atuegwu (born 1977), novelist, playwright, non-fiction writer
- Ayo Ayoola-Amale (active since 2000), poet, lawyer, cultural educator

== B ==
- Simi Bedford (active since the 1990s), novelist

== E ==
- Buchi Emecheta (1944–2017), novelist, children's writer, playwright, lived in Britain
- Rosemary Esehagu (born 1981), Nigerian-American novelist

== F ==
- Bilkisu Funtuwa (active since 1994), Hausa novelist

== I ==
- Jordan Ifueko (born 1997), fantasy writer
- Bassey Ikpi (born 1976), spoken-word poet, writer, mental health advocate
- Elizabeth Isichei (born 1939), non-fiction writer, historian, educator
- Betty Irabor, website magazine columnist

== K ==
- Karen King-Aribisala (active since 1990), novelist, short story writer

== M ==
- Amina Mama (born 1958), non-fiction writer, educator
- Sarah Ladipo Manyika (born 1968), Anglo-Nigerian novelist, short story writer, essayist
- Angela Miri (born 1959), academic and poet

== N ==
- Nkiru Njoku (born c. 1980), screenwriter
- Nnamani Grace Odi (born 2001), writer
- Martina Nwakoby (born 1937), children's writer, novelist
- Flora Nwapa (1931–1993), novelist, short story writer, poet, children's writer, first African woman novelist published in Britain
- Adaobi Tricia Nwaubani (born 1976), novelist, humorist, essayist, journalist

== O ==
- Taiwo Odubiyi (born 1965), romance novelist, children's writer, religious columnist
- Molara Ogundipe (1940–2019), poet, critic, non-fiction writer
- P. A. Ogundipe (1927–2020), educator and first Nigerian woman to be published in English
- Chioma Okereke, Nigerian-born poet, author and short story writer
- Julie Okoh (born 1947), playwright, feminist, educator
- Nnedi Okorafor (born 1974), science fiction and fantasy writer, Nigerian-American Nnedi Okorafor
- Ifeoma Okoye (born 1937), novelist, short story writer, children's writer
- Chinelo Okparanta (active since 2010), Nigerian-American short story writer, educator
- Ukamaka Olisakwe (born 1982), feminist writer, short story writer, screenwriter
- Ayodele Olofintuade, novelist and journalist
- Nuzo Onoh (born 1962), African Horror writer
- Osonye Tess Onwueme (born 1955), playwright, scholar, poet
- Ifeoma Onyefulu (born 1959), children's writer, novelist, photographer
- Bukola Oriola (born 1976), Nigerian American journalist, autobiographer
- Ayisha Osori (active since the late 1990s), lawyer, journalist, business executive
- Helen Ovbiagele (born 1944), romance novelist
- Helen Oyeyemi (born 1984), novelist

== P ==
- Charmaine Pereira (active since the 1990s), feminist scholar, non-fiction writer

== S ==
- Abidemi Sanusi (active since 2000), novelist
- Mabel Segun (1930–2025), poet, children's writer
- Taiye Selasi (born 1979), novelist, short story writer, photographer
- Lola Shoneyin (born 1974), poet, novelist
- Zulu Sofola (1935–1995), Nigeria's first published female playwright, educator

== T ==
- Grace Oladunni Taylor (fl.1970–2004), biochemist, non-fiction writer
- Teresa Meniru (1931–1994), children's writer

== U ==
- Ada Udechukwu (born 1960), poet and artist
- Purity Ada Uchechukwu (born 1971), academic
- Adaora Lily Ulasi (1932–2016), journalist, novelist
- Rosina Umelo (born 1930), short story writer, children's writer
- Chika Unigwe (born 1974), novelist, short story writer
- Pauline Uwakweh or Pauline Onwubiko, writer and academic

== W ==
- Molara Wood (born 1969) journalist, short story writer
- Myne Whitman (born 1977), romance novelist

== Y ==
- Balaraba Ramat Yakubu (born 1959), romance novelist
- Yewande Akinse (born 1992) Nigerian poet and author
