= Nduka (name) =

- Gender: Male
- Language: Igbo

Origin
- Origin: Igboland
- Meaning: Life is supreme

Other names
- Variant form: Ndukaku

Nduka (audio) is a masculine name of Igbo origin. Nduka means "life is supreme".

== Notable individuals with the name ==
- E. J. Nduka, American football player and former wrestler
- Nduka Obaigbena, Nigerian media executive
- Nduka Junior, Nigerian football player
- Sylvia Nduka, Nigerian beauty pageant winner
- Boniface Nduka, Japanese football player
- Charles Nduka, Japanese footballer
- Echezonachukwu Nduka, Nigerian poet and pianist
- Nduka Otiono, Nigerian-Canadian professor
- Nduka Onwuegbute, Nigerian-British playwright and author
- Nduka Odizor, Nigerian tennis player
- Chuck Nduka-Eze, American lawyer
- Nduka Ozokwo, Nigerian footballer
- Nduka Ugbade, Nigerian footballer
- Nduka Awazie, Nigerian sprinter
- Uche Nduka, Nigerian-American poet
- Nduka Usim, Azerbaijani footballer
