= Chikwenye Okonjo Ogunyemi =

Nigerian academic and writer (born 1939)

- Born: 1939 (age 86–87)
- Occupation: University teacher
- Writing career
- Notable work: Africa Wo/man Palava: The Nigerian novel by women (1996)
- Literary movement: Womanism

Chikwenye Okonjo Ogunyemi (born 1939) is a Nigerian academic, a literary critic and writer. She taught at Sarah Lawrence College and she is best known for her articles and books concerning the theory of Womanism and the African Diaspora.

== Career ==
Ogunyemi published Africa Wo/man Palava: The Nigerian novel by women in 1996. The book examined the work of eight Nigerian women writers, namely Zaynab Alkali, Simi Bedford, Buchi Emecheta, Funmilayo Fakunle, Flora Nwapa, Eno Obong, Ifeoma Okoye, and Adaora Lily Ulasi. Ogunyemi set out a new theory of Nigerian literature based on their works. This theory was womanist and feminist, but Ogunyemi also noted that naming is a political issue and by labelling a theory she was not pigeon-holing the writers. Alongside other critics such as Helen Chukwuma and Omolara Ogundipe-Leslie, Ogunyemi explored postcolonial ideas and argued against the work of "phallic critics".

Ogunyemi was professor of literature and also chair of global studies at Sarah Lawrence College in Yonkers, New York. In collaboration with Tuzyline Jita Allan, Ogunyemi edited an anthology of essays, entitled Twelve Best Books by African Women: Critical Readings, which was published in 2009.

== Selected works ==
- Allan, Tuzyline Jita; Ogunyemi, Chikwenye Okonjo (2009). Twelve best books by African women: critical readings. Ohio University Press. ISBN 978-0-89680-266-7.
- Ogunyemi, Chikwenye Okonjo (2007). Juju Fission: Women’s Alternative Fictions from the Sahara, the Kalahari, and the Oases In-Between. Peter Lang. ISBN 978-1-4331-0089-5.
- Ogunyemi, Chikwenye Okonjo (1996). Africa wo/man palava: The Nigerian novel by women. University of Chicago Press. ISBN 9780226620855.
- Ogunyemi, Chikwenye Okonjo (1985). "Womanism: The Dynamics of the Contemporary Black Female Novel in English". Signs. 11 (1): 63–80. doi:10.1086/494200. ISSN 0097-9740. JSTOR 3174287.
