= Rastafari views on gender and sexuality =

The Abrahamic religion of Rastafari emerged in 1930s Jamaica. During its early years it promoted largely patriarchal and conservative attitudes regarding gender and sexuality but these have altered as the religion has matured.

== Women in Rastafari ==
Attitudes to women within Rastafari have changed since the 1970s, with a growing womanist tendency, and increasing numbers of women in leadership positions at local and international levels. However, women remain a minority in the movement, and are often expected to abide by patriarchal gender roles.

=== Traditional views ===
Rasta discourse has traditionally presented women as morally weak, susceptible to deception by evil, and impure while menstruating, citing the Book of Leviticus and the writings of Paul the Apostle. By contrast, Rastafari often espouses the belief that black men in the African diaspora have been emasculated by Babylon and that their manhood must therefore be restored. As a result, Rastafari often affirms patriarchal principles, including the idea that women should submit to male leadership. External observers—including scholars such as Cashmore and Edmonds—have claimed that Rastafari accords women an inferior position to men. Cashmore suggests Rastafari women accept this subordinate position and regard it as their duty to obey their men. The academic Maureen Rowe suggested that women were willing to join the religion despite its restrictions because they valued the life of structure and discipline it provided.

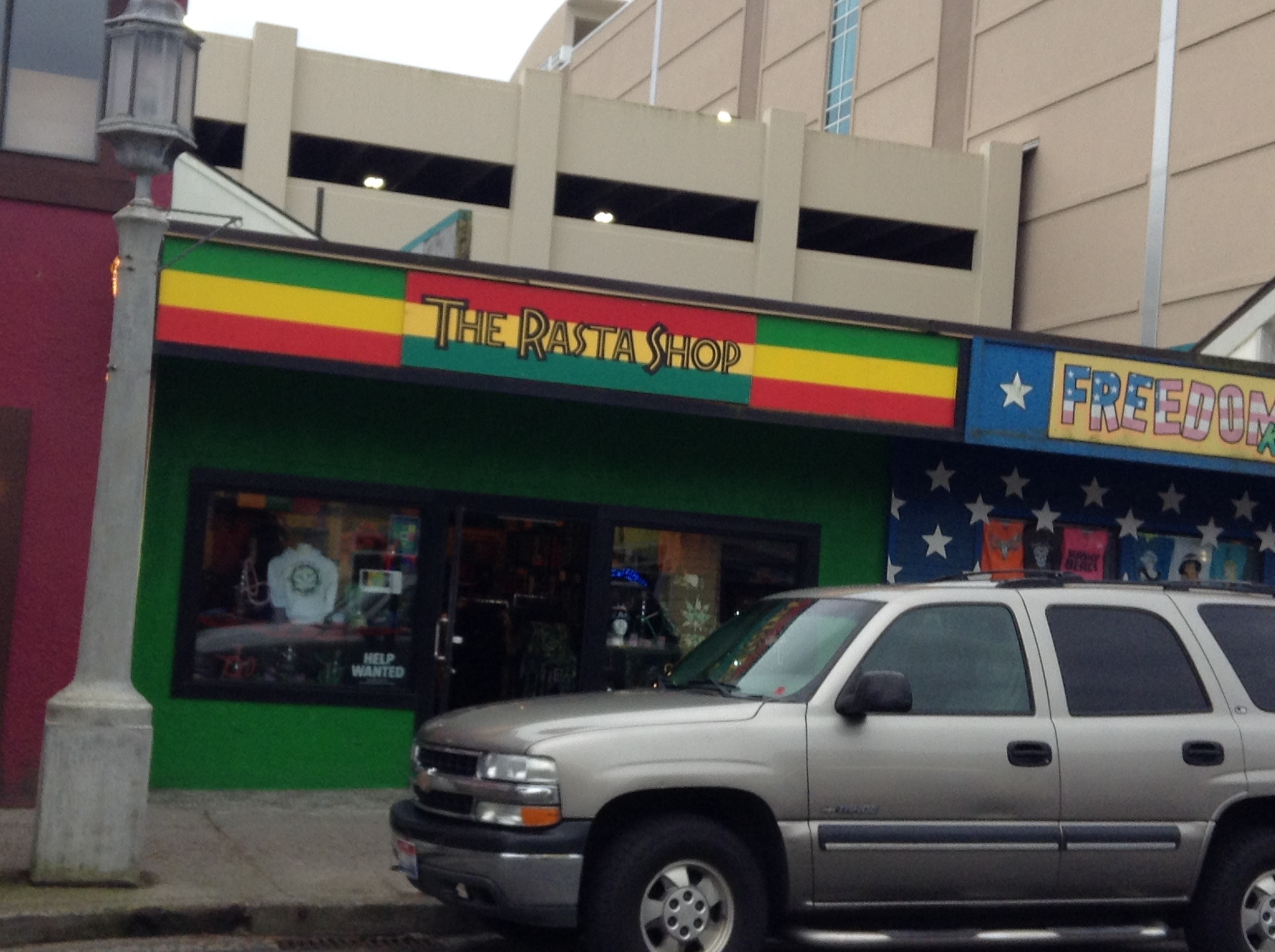
The Rasta Shop, a store selling items associated with Rastafari in the U.S. state of Oregon

Rasta women usually wear clothing that covers their head and hides their body contours. Trousers are usually avoided, with long skirts preferred. Women are expected to cover their head while praying, and in some Rasta groups this is expected of them whenever in public. According to traditional Rasta discourse, this dress code is necessary to prevent the sexual objectification of women by men in Babylon. Rasta men do not usually have such a dress code. Some Rasta women have challenged gender norms by wearing their hair uncovered in public and donning trousers.

Although men and women both took part in early Rasta rituals, from the late 1940s and 1950s the Rasta community increasingly encouraged gender segregation for ceremonies. This was based on the belief that women's menstruation made them impure and that their presence at the ceremonies would distract male participants.

=== Womanism and changing attitudes ===
In the 1970s, growing numbers of Rasta women began calling for greater gender equity in the movement. The scholar Terisa E. Turner, for instance, encountered Kenyan feminists who were using Rastafari content to suit their political agenda. Rastafari typically rejects feminism, with many Rasta women preferring the womanism that emerged among progressive Pan-Africanist Caribbean women during the mid-1970s and early 1980s. Since the late 1990s, attitudes towards women have notably shifted.

According to religious studies scholar Jahlani A. H. Niaah, women are now "ironically over-represented relative to their numbers in positions of international leadership and the general administration of the community". As of 2016, women represented only 20% of Rastafari worldwide, but the movement's lack of central leadership has created opportunities for women to enter leadership positions both locally and globally, even though it still retains varying degrees of gender separation.

Critics Tricia Redeker Hepner and Randal L. Hepner report that many Rastafari women embrace womanist politics and that there is "a chorus" of Rastas advocating for greater parity between men and women. Scholars such as Jahzani Kush and Shamara Wyllie Alhassan suggest that the lack of research into Rasta women in academia makes them appear more marginalised than they actually are.

== Marriage and relationships ==
As it existed in Jamaica, Rastafari did not promote monogamy. Though it is not especially common, Rasta men are permitted to engage in polygamy, while women are expected to reserve their sexual activity for one male partner. Common-law marriage is the norm, although many Rastas are legally married. Rasta men refer to their female partners as "queens", "empresses", or "lionesses", while the males in these relationships are known as "kingmen".

Rastafari places great importance on family life and the raising of children, with reproduction being encouraged. Traditionally, the religion emphasised the place of men in child-rearing, associating this with the recovery of African manhood. Women would often work, sometimes while the man raised the children at home. According to Niaah, Rasta women have increasingly begun to assert their power through motherhood.

== Sex and sexuality ==
Rastafari regards procreation as the purpose of sex, and thus oral and anal sex are usually forbidden. Both contraception and abortion are usually censured, and a common claim in Rasta discourse is that these were inventions of Babylon to decrease the black African birth-rate.

Rastas typically express hostile attitudes to homosexuality, regarding homosexuals as evil and unnatural; this attitude derives from references to same-sex sexual activity in the Bible. Cashmore reported that Rastas typically saw the growing acceptance of birth control and homosexuality in the 1970s and 1980s as evidence of the degeneration of Babylon and proof of its approaching demise. LGBTQ+ Rastas may conceal their sexual orientation because of these attitudes.
