= Taiwo Odubiyi =

Nigerian author and religious minister (born 1965)

Taiwo Iredele Odubiyi
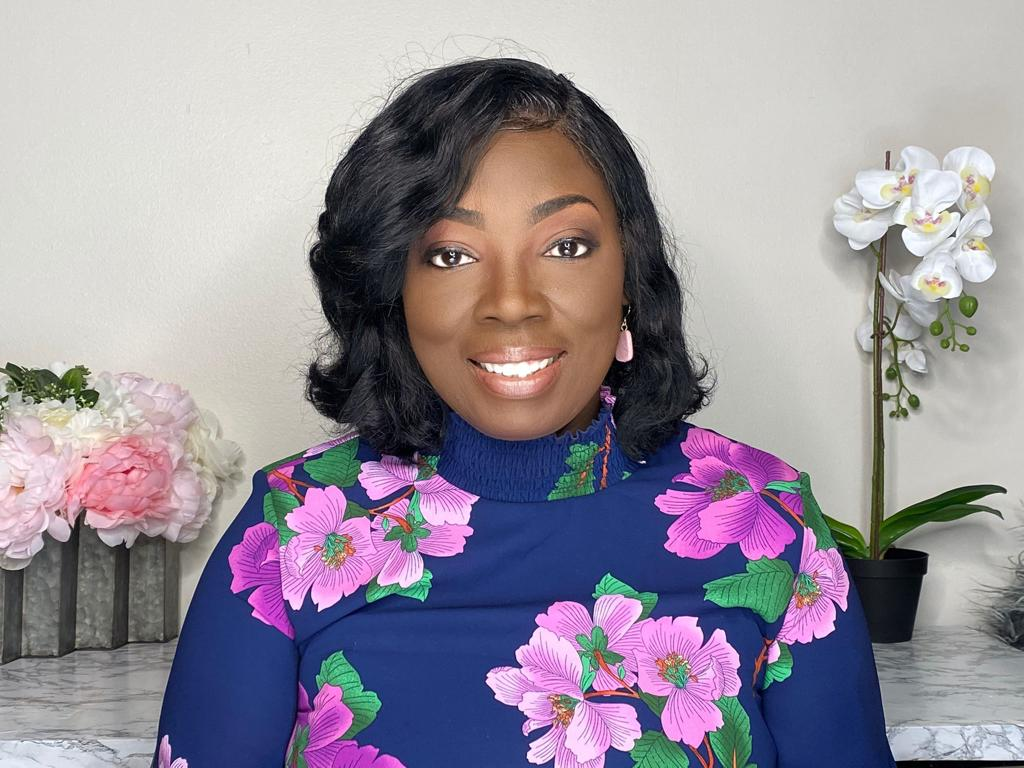
- Born: Taiwo Iredele Odubiyi
- Occupations: Author, pastor, counsellor
- Spouse: Sola Odubiyi
- Writing career
- Language: English, Yoruba
- Genres: Romance, children's literature, inspirational self-help books
- Website: pastortaiwoodubiyi.org

Taiwo Iredele Odubiyi is a Nigerian author, pastor, international speaker, and marriage and relationship counsellor. Taiwo has written romance novels; children's books; and self-help books on rape, relationships, and Christian living. She is the founder of the Pastor Taiwo Odubiyi Ministries. She was a columnist in The Nigerian Canadian News, The National Mirror, and The US immigration Newspaper. She is the host of the podcast, It's All About You, and the YouTube program, TenderHeartsLink (teachings on relationships for the single and the married).

== Life ==
She and her husband, Sola Odubiyi, were ordained as pastors in 1996, under the spiritual leadership of the both now late pastors Taiwo Odukoya and Bimbo Odukoya (the co-founders of the Fountain of Life Church in Lagos, Nigeria). She has three daughters.

== Pastor Taiwo Odubiyi Ministries ==
The Pastor Taiwo Odubiyi Ministries is responsible for multiple projects. They publish novels and informative books and promote evangelism through the TV and radio program It's All About You! . The organization also provides relationship and general counselling, manages the TenderHeartsLink YouTube, and holds programs and seminars for teens, singles, women and married couples.

=== TenderHearts Family Support Initiative ===
TenderHearts Family Support Initiative is a non-governmental organization that deals with supporting, counselling, and encouraging rape victims; reaching out to the less privileged; organizing (organizing) Christmas programs (programs) for children living with disabilities; and rendering emotional & financial support to orphans.

== Books ==
=== Christian romance novels ===
- In Love For Us. Lagos: TenderHeartsLink. 2002. ISBN 978-978-34540-4-0.
- Love Fever. Lagos, Nigeria: TenderHeartsLink. 2003. ISBN 978-978-059-515-9.
- Love on the Pulpit
- Shadows From The Past. Lagos, Nigeria: TenderHeartsLink. 2005. ISBN 978-978-37509-3-7.
- This Time Around. Lagos, Nigeria: TenderHeartsLink. 2006. ISBN 978-978-38515-5-9.
- Tears On My Pillow. Lagos, Nigeria: TenderHeartsLink. 2007. ISBN 9789783750944.
- Oh Baby!. Lagos, Nigeria: TenderHeartsLink. 2008. ISBN 9789783750982.
- To Love Again.
- You Found Me. TenderHeartsLink. 8 December 2013.
- What Changed You?. 2021.
- My First Love.
- Too Much of a Good Thing. 11 February 2018.
- With This Ring. TenderHeartsLink. 24 October 2013.
- The Forever Kind of Love.
- Then Came You.
- The One For Me.
- Sea of Regrets.
- Shipwrecked With You.
- She Who Has a Man.
- Marriage on Fire.
- If You Could See Me Now.
- Accidentally Yours.
- Life Goes On.
- When A Man Loves A Woman.
- My Desire.
- I'll Take You There.
- A Christmas to Remember.
- Comfort and Joy.
- Broken Together
- Friends to Forever
- Made A Way
- To Have and To Hold.
- One Day in December.
- Christmas Joy. 2025.

=== Books for Children and Teens ===
Taiwo believes that it is never too early to teach and educate children on the dangers of sex before marriage, and on being aware of child molesters.

- Rescued by Victor.
- No One is a Nobody.
- Greater Tomorrow
- The Boy Who Stole.
- Joe and His Step-mother, Bibi.
- Nike and the Stranger.
- Billy the Bully.
- Jonah's First Day of School.
- Bimbo Learns a Lesson.
- Crushed by a Crush. TenderHeartsLink Series. 2025.
- A Brother's Promise. TenderHeartsLink Series. 2025.

=== Self-help books ===
- 30 Things Husbands Do That Hurt Their Wives. TenderHeartsLink. February 2009. ISBN 978-978-088-916-6.</ref>
- 30 Things Wives Do That Hurt Their Husbands.
- God's Words to Singles.
- Devotional For Singles.
- Rape & How to Handle It.
  - Published in Yoruba as Ifi'pa bani lopo
- God's Words to Couples.
- God's Words to Women in Ministry.
- God's Words to Older Adults.
- Real Answers Real Quick For Couples.
- Real Answers Real Quick for Singles.

== See also ==
- Nigerian woman novelists

- Chimamanda Ngozi Adichie
- Buchi Emecheta
- Flora Nwapa
- Karen King-Aribisala
- Adaobi Tricia Nwaubani
- Ifeoma Okoye
- Adaora Lily Ulasi
