= Stephanie Mitchem =

American scholar of religious and African American studies (born 1950)

Stephanie Y. Mitchem
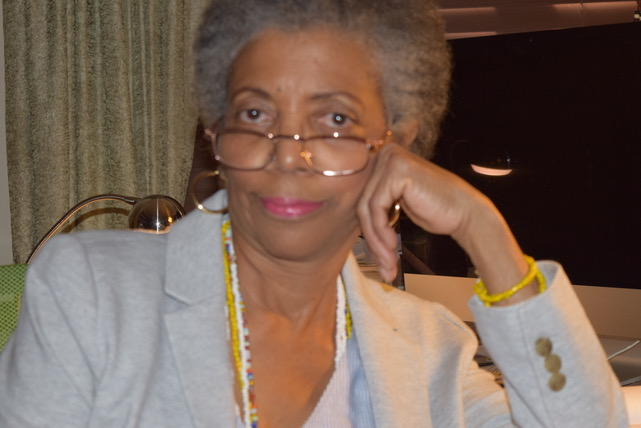
- Born: 1950 (age 75–76); Chicago, Illinois, U.S.
- Citizenship: United States of America
- Occupations: Religious studies scholar and educator
- Spouse(s): Stanley Noyes Lowe, Jr.
- Children: Barbra Lowe (daughter)
- Parent: Barbara Jean Crews Mitchem (mother) Thomas Theodore Mitchem (father)

Academic background
- Education: Garrett-Evangelical Theological Seminary, 1998 St. John's Provincial Seminary, 1989 Sacred Heart Seminary, 1985
- Thesis: Getting off the cross: African-American women, health, and salvation (1998)
- Doctoral advisor: Rosemary Ruether

Academic work
- Discipline: Religious Studies African American Studies
- Sub-discipline: Womanist Theology
- Institutions: University of South Carolina University of Detroit Mercy

Stephanie Y. Mitchem (born 1950) is an American scholar of religious studies and African American studies. Her teaching and research focuses on the African-American religious experience, womanist theology, and the religions of the African diaspora.

Mitchem was the first woman to graduate from Sacred Heart Seminary in her native Detroit and has served as the chair of the Department of Religious Studies and the director of the African American Studies Program at the University of South Carolina. She is the author of four books, an edited volume, and several scholarly articles.

== Early life ==
Stephanie Mitchem was born in 1950 in Chicago, Illinois. Her parents, Barbara Jean Crews Mitchem and Thomas Theodore Mitchem, separated following her father's struggles with alcoholism. Stephanie was raised in Detroit with her younger brothers, Thomas (deceased) and Timothy. The family attended a Black Catholic congregation. Her mother worked as a police officer and was a strict and demanding parent.

== Education ==
Mitchem attended St. Theresa Catholic School and Mackenzie High School in Detroit. At the direction of her mother, she enrolled in Eastern Michigan University as a pre-med student. However, her interests in other topics, including dance classes, distracted her from her pre-med studies. As her grades suffered, she switched her major to Education, but eventually became discouraged and dropped out.

After dropping out of Eastern Michigan, Mitchem worked as a community organizer. She married Stanley Noyes Lowe Jr. and briefly moved to New York where her daughter, Barbra Lowe, was born in 1979. However, the marriage did not last and Mitchem returned to Detroit in 1980 with her daughter. There, as a single parent, she worked for the Catholic Diocese of Detroit as a mediator. At the same time, she returned to school and completed an undergraduate degree in Interdisciplinary Studies at Detroit's Sacred Heart Seminary in 1985. Mitchem was the first woman to graduate from the seminary.

Four years later, in 1989, she completed a Master of Theological Arts at St. John's Provincial Seminary. While completing this degree, Mitchem took a job at the University of Detroit Mercy working in student affairs. She started teaching at the university after completing her master's degree.

With the encouragement of Delores S. Williams, Mitchem enrolled in a doctoral program at the Garrett-Evangelical Theological Seminary on the Northwestern University campus. At Garrett, she studied with Rosemary Ruether, Toilette Eugene, Micaela di Leonardo, and Josef Barton. Her studies centered on topics related to African American women's spirituality and ethnography in Womanist theology. Mitchem completed her doctoral degree in philosophy at Garrett in 1998, with her dissertation entitled, Getting off the cross: African-American women, health, and salvation.

== Career ==
After completing her doctoral degree, Mitchem continued to teach at the University of Detroit Mercy. Mitchem taught in Detroit Mercy's Religious Studies department from 1993 to 2005. While at Detroit Mercy, Mitchem founded the African American Studies Program.

Mitchem took a position as associate professor in the Department of Religious Studies and in the Women's Studies Program at the University of South Carolina in 2005. She was promoted to full professor in 2008 and began her term as chair of the university's African American Studies program that year when Cleveland Sellers left the role. She also chaired the Department of Religious Studies from 2008 to 2014.

In 2023, while serving as Interim Chair of the university's Women and Gender Studies department, Mitchem led a grant-funded program to celebrate the department's 50th anniversary.

As an educator, Mitchem's courses examined topics such as the African American religious experience, African American feminist studies, religions of the African Diaspora, religion and healing, and feminist theory. As a public speaker, Mitchem addresses topics relevant to African American culture and social injustices.

== Theology ==
Stephanie Mitchem's scholarly work is informed by Womanist, anthropological, and ethnographic approaches. She centers the experiences of Black women in her work in contrast to approaches that start from the vantage points of white cultural norms. In reviewing her book, African American Folk Healing, Deirdre Cooper Owens notes that Mitchem's work inherits approaches to scholarship that were practiced by Zora Neale Hurston. Accordingly, Mitchem's personal and intimate knowledge of African American communities and the religious experiences of Black women are inseparable from her intellectual practices.

Her work also examines misogyny and homophobia in the Black church. Raised as a Black Catholic, she expresses an appreciation for the rituals of Catholic liturgy and observes that this background led her to explore African religions. However, Mitchem recalls that her Catholic education included racist assumptions and discriminatory experiences. For example, she observed that her classmates at Sacred Heart Seminary, would ask: "What are you doing here?" Mitchem describes some of these assumptions as a kind of "anit-racist racism" that seeks to minimize the religious thinking and experience of Black women. Mitchem looked for ways to leave the Catholic church and in 2020 expressed that she is not a Christian.

In her article, "No longer nailed to the floor," Mitchem notes that Womanist scholars helped her speak honestly about her experiences and to be true to the experiences of other Black women. For Mitchem, this was intellectually and spiritually freeing and fortifying, but also an exposure to pain. Although these experiences led Mitchem to center on the writings and thoughts of other Black women, she eschews labels and has observed that "Womanist" and "Black feminist" are not globally recognized terms and are less often used on the African continent.

== Writings ==
Mitchem is the author of four books, an edited volume, and several scholarly chapters and articles. Many of these focus on holistic approaches to health in African American communities and the role of spirituality in sustaining health.

=== Books ===
- African American Women Tapping Power and Spiritual Wellness (Pilgrim Press, 2004)
  - Studies the relationships and communal networks that spiritually sustain and support Black women.
- Mitchem, Stephanie (2007). African American Folk Healing. NYU Press. ISBN 978-0-8147-5732-1.
  - In this book focusing on traditional and alternative medicine in Black communities in the United States, Mitchem draws attention to holistic wellness and relational healing practices.
- Mitchem, Stephanie Y. (2007). Name It and Claim It?: Prosperity Preaching in the Black Church. Pilgrim Press. ISBN 978-0-8298-1709-6.
  - Studying the varieties of "prosperity churches" in Black communities, Mitchem describes how these churches provide a cultural response to racism and poverty.
- Mitchem, Stephanie Y.; Townes, Emilie M. (2008). Faith, Health, and Healing in African American Life. Bloomsbury Publishing USA. ISBN 978-1-57356-762-6.
  - Examines the intersections of faith and health in community.
- Mitchem, Stephanie Y. (2014). Introducing Womanist Theology. Orbis Books. ISBN 978-1-60833-199-4.
- Mitchem, Stephanie Y. (2018). Race, Religion, and Politics: Toward Human Rights in the United States. Rowman & Littlefield. ISBN 978-1-5381-0796-6.
  - Chronicling the rise of white nationalism and the intersections of race, religion, and politics in supporting systemic racism, this work keeps the 2016 election of Donald Trump as a focal point for demonstrating the role of these factors in U.S. culture. Mitchem argues that restorative justice is a liberating force for all Americans.

=== Chapters ===
- Mitchem, Stephanie (2003). ""What doesn't kill you will make you strong": Black women and Catholic colleges". In Hesse-Biber, Sharlene Nagy; Leckenby, Denise (eds.). Women in Catholic Higher Education: Border Work, Living Experiences, and Social Justice. Lexington Books. ISBN 978-0-7391-0582-5.
- Mitchem, Stephanie Y. (2013). "The Gendered Politics of Religious Intimacies". Religion, Gender, and the Public Sphere. Routledge. doi:10.4324/9780203754009-12 (inactive 12 July 2025). ISBN 978-0-203-75400-9.
- Mitchem, Stephanie Y. (2014). "Embodiment in African American Theology". In Pinn, Anthony B.; Cannon, Katie G. (eds.). The Oxford Handbook of African American Theology. Oxford University Press. pp. 308–318. doi:10.1093/oxfordhb/9780199755653.013.0022. ISBN 9780199755653.
- Mitchem, Stephanie (2016). "Womanist/Postcolonial/Pastoral". In Pui-lan, Kwok; Burns, Stephen (eds.). Postcolonial Practice of Ministry: Leadership, Liturgy, and Interfaith Engagement. Lexington Books. ISBN 978-1-4985-3449-9.

=== Articles ===
- Mitchem, Stephanie. "Barbie insurrection: Tales from the liberatory teaching front". Journal of Women and Religion. 17. Berkeley: 31–41. ProQuest 203891336.
- Mitchem, Stephanie (2000). "Sankofa: Black Theologies". CrossCurrents. 50 (1/2): 177–184. ISSN 0011-1953. JSTOR 24461246.
- Mitchem, Stephanie Y. (2001). "Womanists and (Unfinished) Constructions of Salvation". Journal of Feminist Studies in Religion. 17 (1): 85–100. ISSN 8755-4178. JSTOR 25002403.
- Mitchem, Stephanie Y. (Fall 2002). ""There Is a Balm..." Spirituality & Healing among African American Women". Michigan Family Review. 07 (1): 19. doi:10.3998/mfr.4919087.0007.103. hdl:2027/spo.4919087.0007.103. ISSN 1558-7258.
- Mitchem, Stephanie Y. (2003). "No Longer Nailed to the Floor". CrossCurrents. 53 (1): 64–74. ISSN 0011-1953. JSTOR 24461114.
- Mitchem, Stephanie Y. (2004). "WHAT'S LOVE GOT TO DO? (& other stories of black women's sexualities)". CrossCurrents. 54 (3): 72–84. ISSN 0011-1953. JSTOR 24460591.
- Mitchem, Stephanie Y. (2005). "Coloring outside the Lines". Journal of Feminist Studies in Religion. 21 (2): 128–130. ISSN 8755-4178. JSTOR 25002543.
- Mitchem, Stephanie Y. (2009). "Thinking about Feminist Leadership". Journal of Feminist Studies in Religion. 25 (1): 197–201. doi:10.2979/fsr.2009.25.1.197. ISSN 8755-4178. JSTOR 10.2979/fsr.2009.25.1.197.
- Mitchem, Stephanie Y. (2018). "Embodiment, Gender, and Re-Ligion". CrossCurrents. 68 (4): 550–560. ISSN 0011-1953. JSTOR 26756885.
- Mitchem, Stephanie Y. (March 2020). "Elections Have Consequences". CrossCurrents. 70 (1): 5–7. doi:10.1353/cro.2020.a783425. ISSN 1939-3881.

== Impact ==
Stephanie Mitchem has served on the editorial board of the publication, CrossCurrents, and received the Wise Woman Award from the National Association of Women in Catholic Higher Education. Mitchem is also the subject of book chapter focused on her work as a scholar of religion.

Mitchem's work as a scholar has expanded womanist inquiry beyond the United States. Her recent scholarship is committed to racial justice and justice for women internationally and particularly in Nigeria and other African countries. In all contexts, Mitchem uses ethnographic approaches to describe and promote healing and human rights grounded in communal experience.
