= Chidera =

Given name

- Gender: male/female
- Language: Igbo

Origin
- Meaning: Once God has written
- Region of origin: Igboland

Other names
- Variant form: Odera
- Short form: Dera

Chidera audio is a name given by the Igbo people of Nigeria, and is applicable to both sexes. It means “once God has written”. There is also a variant of the name “Odera”, which means "once He has written", "He" in this case also referring to God. A diminutive version of the name is “Dera”.

== Notable people with the name ==
- Chidera Eggerue, Nigerian writer and fashion blogger
- Chidera Ejuke, Nigerian professional footballer
- Chidera Okolie, Nigerian writer
- Chidera Ezeh, Nigerian footballer
- Chidera Anamege, American rapper
