= Bukola =

Bùkọ́lá
- Gender: Unisex

Origin
- Origin: Nigerian
- Meaning: Adds to wealth, success
- Region of origin: South-west Nigeria

Other names
- Derivative: Bukky

Bukola audio (Bùkọ́lá) is a Nigerian unisex given name of Yoruba origin which means "added wealth." It is a diminutive version of names such as "Olúwabùkọ́lá" meaning "God has added to Wealth" and "Adébùkọ́lá" meaning "The Crown has added to Wealth".

== Notable people with the name ==
- Bukola Abogunloko (born 1994), Nigerian sprinter
- Bukola Wright (born 1967) Nigerian actress-politician
- Bukola Elemide (born 1982), Nigerian French singer-songwriter
- Bukola Oriola (born 1976), Nigerian American journalist
- Bukola Saraki (born 1962), Nigerian politician
- Bukola Williams (born 1980), Nigerian medical doctor turned pastor
