= Clenora Hudson-Weems =

African-American author and academic (born 1945)

Clenora F. Hudson-Weems (born July 23, 1945) is an African-American author and academic who is currently a professor of English at the University of Missouri. She coined the term "Africana womanism" in the late 1980s, contending that women of African descent have always been Africana womanists by their very nature, dating back to Africana women in antiquity, even before the coinage of the word itself. Africana Womanism, a family-centered paradigm, observed this phenomenon, then proceeded in naming and defining a paradigm relative to who Africana women are and how they go about their daily lives in both the home place and the workplace.

Hudson-Weems wrote a research paper entitled "The Tripartite Plight of the Black Woman—Racism, Classism and Sexism—in Our Nig, Their Eyes Were Watching God and The Color Purple" during her first semester as a Ph.D. student at the University of Iowa in 1985. She set up a panel on the need for prioritizing race, class and gender for Black women and presented it at the 1986 National Council for Black Studies Annual conference, which was later published in the Journal of Black Studies in 1989.

Hudson-Weems has written many papers concerning the distinctions between Africana womanism, earlier called Black Womanism, Womanism and Black feminism. She believed that Black Feminism was lacking some crucial ideas in its concept, which motivated her to come up with Black/Africana Womanism. She was concerned about how the already existing concepts such as feminism, black feminism, womanism, did not include an authentic agenda for Africana women.

Her book Africana Womanism: Reclaiming Ourselves was released in 1993 even though several publishers were hesitant to take on the manuscript due to the controversial issues surrounding black women's rejection of "mainstream" feminist ideology.

Hudson-Weems took a strong position that black women should not have to rely on Eurocentric feminism for their liberation when they have a rich history and legacy of women of African descent. [Hill 1811] She believed that many people viewed Africana Womanism as risking their professional security and also as invalidating their years of research from the Black feminist perspective. She wished people viewed the concept as "a natural evolutionary process of ideological growth and development" from Black feminism to Africana womanism (Hudson-Weems, "... Entering the New Millenium" 36).

Hudson-Weems criticized Black feminists because they did not acknowledge Africana feminism's essential and underlying foundation "nommo", its name. She discusses Africana Womanism and compares it to other branches of feminism and explains what they are lacking in her book Africana Womanist Literary Theory in 2004.

Hudson-Weems is also the author of Emmett Till: The Sacrificial Lamb of the Civil Rights Movement (1994).

== Distinctions ==
Some very clear distinctions exist between the terms womanist and feminist. Feminism is focused on the equal treatment of women in terms of social, political, and economic rights. Despite the fact that there has been immense progress for women under this ideology, some feminist scholars argue that it has effectively upheld white supremacist thought and boxed out women of color.

Womanism, on the other hand, is the notion that women should be valued not only as much as men, but as much as other women—regardless of race, class, and other elements that dictate social order. Its origins trace back to Sojourner Truth's 1851 speech "Ain't I A Woman?" where she calls into question this notion of womanhood that does not successfully encompass all the lives it seeks to control. As a black woman, and a slave, Truth was denied the courtesies, the respect, and the basic human rights given to her white female counterparts. This skewed social dynamic that glorified white womanhood transcended time periods, which is why distinctions between feminism and womanism are necessary today. Womanism focuses specifically on the ties linking women of color to one another, while also creating a very distinct dichotomy between the ways in which women of color might operate differently than their white feminist counterparts under the same oppressive forces. As Alice Walker famously said, "Womanism is to feminism as purple is to lavender", one pales in comparison to the other. Clenora Hudson-Weems contends that feminism, on its own, does not consider the intersectional realities of the lives of Africana women, thus, solidifying their position as "the other". The bias shown toward these individuals is upheld by the longstanding existence of patriarchy. It was noted that "...patriarchal societies have manifested a fear of foreigners or difference and have suppressed women in numerous ways". In so doing, the delineation between which forms of womanhood are acceptable and which are not, is very clearly established. To combat this lack of inclusivity, womanism—as an ideology—acts as the voice of the unheard; it is "...an Afrocentric paradigm that can embrace the activism of all African women, recognized or ignored, who have struggled to liberate African people on a global scale". This gives Africana women a platform on which they can stand up and be heard, a people with whom they can identify, and a voice with which they can actively speak.

An even more specific subset of womanism, which identifies African women as the focus, is Africana womanism. Some scholars argue that feminism in some ways waters down an individual's cultural identity and generalizes women to a non-inclusive umbrella category, while Africana womanism allows one to maintain their cultural identity. In terms of its distinction from womanism, Africana womanism is very ethnically specific. It facilitates the distinction of individual self-identification, dependent upon one's cultural background. The agency of Africana individuals is lacking, primarily because Western culture advocates Eurocentric beliefs rather than Afrocentric beliefs. To consider one's ethnic identity in the context of patriarchy is to encourage women of African descent to acknowledge their own unique, situational experiences. This offers women a mechanism of self-identification that can ease the burden of everyday life under socially, economically, religiously, and culturally limiting structures.
