= Africana womanism =

Ideology focused on women of African descent

Africana womanism is a term coined in the late 1980s by American writer Clenora Hudson-Weems, intended as an ideology applicable to all women of African descent. It is grounded in African culture and Afrocentrism and focuses on the experiences, struggles, needs, and desires of Africana women of the African diaspora. It distinguishes itself from feminism, or Alice Walker's womanism. Africana womanism pays more attention to and focuses more on the realities and the injustices in society in regard to race.

Hudson-Weems sought to create an ideology specific to African women and women of African descent. Hudson-Weems believes that the creation of the ideology separates African women's accomplishments from African male scholars, feminism, and Black feminism.

The Africana Womanism Society lists 18 characteristics of the Africana womanist, including being self-naming, self-defining, family-centered, flexible, and desiring positive male companionship.

== Where Womanism stems from ==
Alice Walker coined the term womanism in 1983. She defines womanism as being that of encompassing feminist approaches while being more inclusive towards African American women. Alice Walker felt as though the feminist movement, as understood then and now, to be exclusive towards women of color as it offered a privilege to white women. Alice Walker's womanism confronts both the privilege of the white woman as well as the divide between men and women in search of the growth African American people. Alice Walker believes that womanism has been around since the time of slavery. Walker claims that, "This ability to hold on, even in very simple ways, is work Black women have done for a very long time.". Walker is saying that women of color have known the struggles of holding on to their strengths and allowing for the progression of others before them.

== Development ==
Clenora Hudson-Weems, Professor of English, University of Missouri, author of Africana Womanism: Reclaiming Ourselves, coined the concept Africana womanism in the late 1980s (Africana is the feminine form of the Latin Africanus, meaning Of Africa, and appears to be preferred by the movement over African). Hudson-Weems argues that "Africana womanism is not an addendum to feminism, Black feminism, African feminism, or Alice Walker's womanism" Feminism and gender issues are separate entities that are not reliant upon each other, and therefore, Africana women are able to address gender issues without partaking in feminist activity.

According to Patricia Hill Collins, "Although some Africana women may support the very ideas on which feminism rests, however, many of them reject the term 'feminism' because of what they perceive as its association with white women's cause. They see feminism as operating exclusively within the terms white and American and perceive its opposite as being Black and American."

Further, many African men and women do not accept the ideology of feminism. According to Hudson-Weems, she states that "there is a general consensus in the Africana community that the feminist movement, by and large, is the white woman's movement for two reasons. First, the Africana woman does not see the man as her primary enemy as does the white feminist, who is carrying out an age-old battle with her white male counterpart for subjugating her as his property. Africana men have never had the same institutionalized power to oppress Africana women as white men have had to oppress white women."

Africana womanism contrasts a racist and sexist feminist/womanist ideology, and many Africana women (and men) have come to embrace it. Hudson-Weems (1998), Africana Womanism: Reclaiming Ourselves, explains the development of Africana Womanism:

Africana womanism is a term I coined and defined in 1987 after nearly two years of publicly debating the importance of self-naming for Africana women. Why the term 'Africana womanism'? Upon concluding that the term 'Black womanism' was not quite the terminology to include the total meaning desired for this concept, I decided that 'Africana womanism,' a natural evolution in naming, was the ideal terminology for two basic reasons. The first part of the coinage, Africana, identifies the ethnicity of the woman being considered, and this reference to her ethnicity, establishing her cultural identity, relates directly to her ancestry and land base—Africa. The second part of the term womanism, recalls Sojourner Truth's powerful impromptu speech 'Ain't I a Woman?', one in which she battles with the dominant alienating forces in her life as a struggling Africana woman, questioning the accepted idea of womanhood. Without question she is the flip side of the coin, the co-partner in the struggle for her people, one who, unlike the white woman, has received no special privileges in American society.

Africana womanist ideology contributes to Afrocentric discourse. Africana womanism fundamental foundation is built on traditional Africana philosophy and values and on Afrocentric theories: Some of the traditional values forefront the role of African mothers as leaders in the struggle to regain, reconstruct, and create a cultural integrity that espouses the ancient Maatic principles of reciprocity, balance, harmony, justice, truth, righteousness, order, and so forth.

Lastly, Nah Dove (1998), "African Womanism: An Afrocentric Theory", credits Hudson-Weems and other scholars in shaping the Africana womanist model. Dove asserts:

A concept [Africana Womanism] that has been shaped by the work of women such as Clenora Hudson-Weems, Ifi Amadiume, Mary E. Modupe Kolawole, and others. African womanism may be viewed as fundamental to the continuing development of Afrocentric theory. Africana womanism brings to the forefront the role of African mothers as leaders in the struggle to regain, reconstruct, and create a cultural integrity that espouses the ancient Maatic principles of reciprocity, balance, harmony, justice, truth, righteousness, order, and so forth. (p. 535)

=== What Makes Walker's Womanism So Different From Africana Womanism? ===
Clenora Hudson-Weems, who coined the term Africana Womanism, claims that the term itself is not mean to be Black feminism or Walker's womanism that some women of color have considered themselves to be. Clenora Hudson-Weems' Africana Womanism is to stand as the reminder for Africana Women that they should demand and prioritize themselves in their inclusion of equal career opportunities and employment for their male counterparts, fair treatment for themselves and their children. Alice Walker's womanism differentiates itself from Clenora Hudson-Weems' Africana Womanism because it entails being more inclusive to all women of color. Whereas, Clenora Hudson-Weems seems to take more of a stance on "No one will show up for Black women like Black women show up for themselves" or Africana Women taking responsibilities for themselves as well as their children and Africana men.

== Eighteen key components ==
Africana Womanism Society lists 18 characteristics 18 key components that form Africana womanism. The characteristics are the following: Self-Naming, Self-Definition, Family-Centeredness, Wholeness, Role Flexibility, Adaptability, Authenticity, Black Female Sisterhood, Struggling with males against oppression, Male Compatibility, Recognition, Ambition, Nurturing, Strengthen, Respect, Respect for Elders, Mothering, and Spirituality.

Each of the characteristics listed above have specific meanings that collectively establish a basis for Africana womanism. The first principle Self-Naming discusses the importance of self-identifying as an African woman in society. The Africana identification is distinguishable from feminism and Black variants. Self-naming is the period of recognizing the need for an Africana movement with its own name. The second principle defined, Self-Definition, begins to describe realities that African women face, through a Pan-African lens. The Pan-African movement attempts to create a sense of brotherhood among all people of African descent, regardless of whether or not they live on the continent of Africa. Self-definition explores gender inequalities and stereotypes in the modern patriarchy.

Self-naming and self-definition are the first two couple of characteristics of Africana womanism. The term "nommo" is given to the idea of self-naming, which is important because in order for one to exist it has to be given a correct name. There is an increasing need for self-naming, self-defining, and self-identity for Black people and self-defining helps to discover one's identity through their own point of view of their world that goes against that of the dominant culture.

The second groupings of characteristics are family-centeredness, wholeness, authenticity, role flexibility, adaptability, struggling with Black men against oppression, and Black female sisterhood. The second grouping of characteristics includes Family-Centeredness, Wholeness, Authenticity, Role Flexibility, Adaptability, In Concert With Men, and Genuine Sisterhood. The principle of family-centeredness focuses on the entire black family unit. The interest in the success of the black community as a whole maintains a sense of wholeness. Any important outcomes are shared as overarching closeness of the Black community is enforced by the women in society.

The commitment to immediate and extended family is of crucial importance to African women, as it shapes the third principle outlined by Clenora Hudson-Weems. The principle of wholeness describes the importance of self-sufficiency that an African woman must have in order to upkeep her household. Wholeness also stresses the required self-esteem that emanates from within an African woman who must be strong for not only herself, but for her family and community as a whole. Completeness, going hand in hand with wholeness, is defined as the unbroken unity that an African woman is responsible for upholding inside the home and out.

The first five components all emphasize the commitment to family that is of major importance to Black women. There is a high interest in success of the group and collective outcomes that maintains a sense of wholeness. Nikol Alexander-Floyd (2006) states that there is this balance of putting the family first, which would be wholeness, without neglecting the career of the women or as he states it here authenticity. Role flexibility and adaptability are also important parts of family-centeredness because of their roots in the history of Black women. The Role Flexibility principle acknowledges and discusses the fact that the Black woman has never been a subjugate. African women are active in the workforce, take part in leadership opportunities presented, and do not need to be domestic.

In history, Black women have experienced flexible gender roles meaning that Black women not only had experience working outside of home along with men but all within the home. For adaptability, Black women not only adapted to different work environments but also to the lack of luxuries that were experienced by white women and feminists. Lastly, for struggling with Black men against oppression and Black female sisterhood, Africana womanist see that there is a fight against oppression that is being fought by Black men and see themselves fighting on the same team as Black men. Sisterhood in Africana womanism has to be genuine and is genuine through the fact that Black women go through the same experience of oppression and can therefore empathize with one another.

Due to these conditions, Black women were forced to undergo while under white domination, African women developed an extreme ability to be adaptable. Women were forced to sacrifice their own goods and desires for the sake of often, their safety. Black women were often forced to compromise their dignity, as well as their ambition. Lastly, there are In Concert With Men and Genuine Sisterhood. In concert with men is the African woman's push to develop strong relationships with like minded men in the struggle for overarching Black liberation and the eventually Black women's liberation. The concept of Genuine Sisterhood, which is one of the eighteen characteristics of Africana Womanism, is integral for the survival of women in a male-dominated society, and for Black people in a white-dominated society.

As described by Nobel Prize-winning author Toni Morrison, "In wielding the power that is deservedly yours, don't permit it to enslave your sisters". Morrison's insights refer to the frequency that women tear each other down, as she continues to describe that this behavior is especially common in the workplace. The foundation of female relationships is violated by the habitual behavior in that women treat each other with disrespect and cruelty. Sisterhood in Africana womanism has to be genuine and is genuine through the fact that Black women go through the same experience of oppression and can therefore empathize with one another.

The third and last clustering of characteristics are strength, male compatibility, respect, recognition, respect for elders, ambition, mothering, nurturing, and spirituality. Historically, Black women were always had psychological and physical strengthen especially with what happened with slavery. Hudson-Weems says that Black men's and Black women's bond helps to maintain the race. Black woman are physically and mentally strong. This principle of Strength is often the one that is attacked by non-Africana oppressors because their goal is to force submission upon the powerful group that is Africana women. Hudson-Weems says that Black men's and Black women's bond helps to maintain the race. Therefore, the principle of male compatibility is based upon mutually beneficial relationships between a well-respected African woman and a supportive, like-minded, man.

Respect and recognition go together that is necessary for a healthy respect for Africana womanists, and it helps them relate to others. Respect and recognition also contribute to the self-love and admiration and to the respect for elders or older members in the Black community. To dissect both principles a bit further, respect refers to reverence an African woman has for herself, absent of the colonized standards. Determining one's worth, while ignoring politics, is crucial to becoming a confident African woman. The pillar of Recognition refers to the acknowledgement of humanity, capability, and power of Black women. Recognition plays a large role in keeping communal peace and ensuring the Black women's effectiveness in the struggle for equality.

The principles that outline the caring nature of the Africana womanist are defined below. Respect for Elders, is an extension of the historical African tradition of ancestral reverence. Ancestral reverence is the habitual act of caring for elders, and eventual ancestors, within a community or society. Once the elders become ancestors, they will be responsible for providing wisdom and guidance which is highly vauled.

The Nurturer and Motherer are both described a call for all community members to play an active role in the rearing of the community and propaganda of the race through care. It is an African woman's duty to not only care and nourish her family, but to provide the care and nourishment for her race as a whole. By fostering and guiding fellow women, the Africana Movement is advanced. The initiative taken to further the public's appreciation and education about the Africana Movement exemplifies the principle of Ambition.

The final principle is Spirituality, which stresses the importance of the reverence for traditional African spiritual systems. These spiritual systems call for a collection of the principles including Ancestral Reverence, Oneness with oneself, and with nature as well. Africana womanist are also very spiritual and believe in a higher power and their mothering and nurturing is tradition.

=== Other focuses and concerns ===
Hudson-Weems (2000) states that the rejection of white organizations is something that Africana women take part in. Africana women focus on things that help with the elimination of oppression, which is considered to be the most important thing in order for the Africana community to survive. Alongside the rejection of white organizations, Africana womanism puts priority on the human dignity of Africana women, children, and men. It focuses on race as the main importance for Africana women. Racism is seen to be a priority over sexism, and sexism is seen to derive from racism, classism, and economic prejudices.

Some problems of Africana women, according to Hudson-Weems, include "physical brutality, sexual harassment, and female subjugation in general perpetrated both within and outside the race" and has to be solved in Africana communities collectively.

While many think of Africana womanism as being similar to that of Black feminism, African feminism, womanism, and feminism, there are clear distinctions in agenda for the forms of women empowerment.

== Values ==
The Africana womanist concept was best exemplified in Brenda Verner's (1994) article "The Power and Glory of Africana Womanism":

Africana Womanism in essence says: We love men. We like being women. We love children. We like being mothers. We value life. We have faith in God and the Bible. We want families and harmonious relationships. We are not at war with our men seeking money, power and influence through confrontation. Our history is unique. We are the inheritors of African-American women's history, and as such we shall not redefine ourselves nor that history to meet some politically correct image of a popular culture movement, which demands the right to speak for and redefine the morals and mores of all racial, cultural and ethnic groups. Nor shall we allow the history to be "shanghied" to legitimatize the "global political agenda" of others. We reject the status of victim. Indeed, we are victors, Sisters in Charge of our own destiny. We are Africana culture-keepers: Our primary obligation is to the progress of our cultural way of life through the stability of family and the commitment to community. The practice of cultural womanism is not limited to Africana women. Italian, Japanese, Hispanic, East Indian, Arab, Jewish women, etc., all utilize this approach to decision-making, and know the value of maintaining indigenous cultural autonomy. The rite of passing generation-to-generation knowledge free from outside manipulation, coercion or intimidation insures traditional integrity, which fosters a climate of cultural security. Traditional cultures should not be obligated to bow to redefinitions foisted upon them by elitist entities that gain their authority via the drive of well-organized "media hype."

== Male-womanist ==
Africana men can embrace an Africana womanist approach. According to Tolagbe Ogunlege (1998), "Referring to a man as a male-womanist is not an anomaly or rarity, and bestowing gender-specific title on individuals of the opposite sex has been practiced by Africana peoples for millennia. For example, among the Yoruba, an exceptional woman who has made significant contributions to the educational, socioeconomic, and/or spiritual growth and development of her family and community is referred to as a man-woman or obinrin bi okunrin." Ogunlege further explains that among the Lebou people of Senegal, a man who governs according to ancient customs is referred to as the "Mother of the Country".

== In education ==
The Africana womanist concept was adopted by many faculty in higher education. According to Daphne W. Ntiri (2001), Associate Professor of Social Science, Wayne State University: "Since Clenora Hudson-Weems broke new ground with her 1993 book Africana Womanism: Reclaiming Ourselves, discourse on the place and agenda of Africana women in the women's movement reflects the text's influence. In only six years, this work is in the second printing of its third revised edition.

It has been adopted by faculty in several higher education institutions in as far away places as Africa, Brazil, Japan, and the Caribbean Islands. Adoption at national universities includes Clark Atlanta University, California State University-Long Beach, Florida A&M, Indiana State University, Northern Illinois University, San Francisco State University, Temple University, the University of Missouri, and the University of Utah to name a few" (p. 163).

== Examples in literature ==
Drawing on the tenets of Africana womanism, Clenora Hudson-Weems extends the theoretical framework to literary analysis. Such an analysis of Africana literature emphasizes the family, complementarity between men and women, and commitment to the survival and liberation of the community as a whole. In her text, Africana Womanist Literary Theory, Hudson-Weems explores select Africana novels in order to offer Africana womanist interpretations. Five Africana Womanist novels: Zora Neale Hurston, Their Eyes Were Watching God. Hudson-Weems states that the character Janie is a protagonists to name and define herself.

Also, a protagonist of family-centeredness (pp. 81–82); Mariama Ba, a renowned Senegalese writer, So Long a Letter, Ba's attack on polygamous society that subjugates women, and her interests in the rights of Africana women are reflected in her novel. According to Hudson-Weems "the novel does not justify categorizing it as a feminist novel, which the author dedicates the book 'To all women and men of good will,' thereby demonstrating her natural inclination to include men as a very important part of women's lives" (Hudson-Weems, pp. 93–94); Paule Marshall, a prominent African-Caribbean writer, Praisesong for the Widow, which the character "Reena" bears the historical nuances of so-called shortcomings of the Africana woman in relationship with her male companion.

Pauline, the narrator, advocates a solution to the deteriorating relationship between the Africana man and woman (Hudson-Weems, p. 105); Toni Morrison, Beloved. Hudson-Weems asserts that "From Morrison first novel, The Bluest Eye, to Sula, Song of Solomon, Tar Baby, and finally to her fifth novel, Beloved, the author develops the roles of the male and the female in this collective struggle" (p. 119); and Terry McMillan, Disappearing Acts. Hudson-Weems explains that the character Zora Banks is self-naming and self-defining, family-centered and compatible, flexible with her roles and ambitions, demanding of respect and strong, reverent of elders and authentic, and last but not least, nurturing and mothering (pp. 133–134).

Africana womanist literature also consists of Africana family dynamics, Africana women and men—their interrelationship, and experiences within their communities, and religion. For instance: Russell J. Rickford (2003) Betty Shabazz: Surviving Malcolm X: A Journey of Strength from Wife to Widow to Heroine; Ilyasah Shabazz (2002), Growing Up X: A Memoir by the Daughter of Malcolm X; Sonsyrea Tate (1997) Growing Up in the Nation of Islam; Yvonne S. Thornton, M.D. (1995), The Ditchdigger's Daughters: A Black Family's Astonishing Success Story; Alex Haley (1976) Roots: The Saga of an American Family; Coretta Scott King (1969), My Life with Martin Luther King Jr. In addition to Regina Jennings (2001), Africana Womanism in The Black Panther Party: A Personal Story, published in the Western Journal of Black Studies. Jennings describes her experiences as a young woman who joined the Black Panther Party in Oakland, California, using the theory of Africana Womanism.

== Criticism ==
It has been suggested that Africana womanism promotes a static, monolithic notion of African culture to claim an “authentic” Black female identity. Alexander-Floyd and Simien (2006) argue that Africana womanism prioritizes racial loyalty over confronting sexism within Black communities, delegitimizes Black feminists as assimilationist or naive, and offers no real strategies for praxis. Other scholars have described its values as gender essentialist and heteronormative.
