= Ifeoma Okoye =

Nigerian novelist

Ifeoma Mokwugo Okoye
- Born: Possibly 1937; Anambra State, Nigeria
- Education: St. Monica's College, Ogbunike
- Alma mater: University of Nigeria, Nsukka; Aston University
- Occupation: Novelist
- Known for: Children's books

Ifeoma Mokwugo Okoye // born on 21st December (possibly in 1937) is a Nigerian novelist. She has been referred to by fans as "the most important female novelist from Nigeria after Flora Nwapa and Buchi Emecheta," according to Oyekan Owomoyela. She was born in Anambra State in Eastern Region, Nigeria. She went to school at St. Monica's College in Ogbunike to receive a teaching certificate in 1959. She then graduated from the University of Nigeria in Nsukka to earn a Bachelor of Arts honours degree in English in 1977. She wrote novels including Behind the Clouds, children's novels and short stories, such as The Village Boy and Eme Goes to School.

== Early life and education ==
Ifeoma Okoye was born on 21st December, possibly in 1937 in Anambra State, Nigeria. She went to school at St. Monica's College in Ogbunike and earned a teaching certificate. She then taught at St. Monica's college for two years. During the years of 1963 to 1967, she attended All Saints International School in Enugu. She ran her own nursery school in Enugu from 1971 to 1974. From 1974 to 1977, Okoye went to study at the University of Nigeria, Nsukka, where she earned her Bachelor of Arts in English. From 1986 to 1987, she studied at Aston University in England, where she obtained a postgraduate degree in English. Later, she taught English at Nnamdi Azikiwe University until 2000.

== Accomplishments ==
Although Okoye was known for her children's short stories, she also wrote some books for adults, such as Behind the Clouds. Behind the Clouds was about a couple who fails to have children, and how the blame mainly falls on the woman instead of the man. Okoye received prizes for both Behind the Cloud and The Village Boy from the Nigerian National Council of Art and Culture in 1983, along with earning the best fiction of the year award for the novel Men Without Ears, in 1984. In 1985, she received another award for Daily Bread after Eze at the Ife National Book Fair. She was also the African Regional Winner for the Commonwealth Short Story Competition in 1999.

== Major works ==
Okoye's writing career began after her years in education. She wrote short stories and novels. While the majority of her works were short stories for children, she also wrote some novels for adults.

- GO FOR GOLD With Your Writing: A Practical Self-Guide To Writing Gold-Winning Sentences. The Rising People's Press. 28 December 2016. ISBN 978-1-912022-56-4.
- The Fourth World. Enugu, Nigeria: The Rising People's Press. 2013. ISBN 978-978-910-215-0.
- The Power of a Plate of Rice. circa 2011.
- The Trial and Other Stories. African Heritage Press. January 2005. ISBN 978-0-9628864-9-2.
- Ayo and His Pencil. Heinemann. 1995. ISBN 978-0-435-89677-5.
- Neka Goes to Market. Heinemann Educational. 1995. ISBN 978-0-435-89723-9.
- Chika's House. Heinemann. 1995. ISBN 978-0-435-89678-2.
- Chimere. Longman Nigeria. 1992. ISBN 978-978-139-634-2.
- Men Without Ears. Longman. 1 May 1984. ISBN 978-0-582-78581-6.
- Behind the Clouds. Longman. 1 January 1982.
- Village Boy!. Macmillan Nigeria. 1986 [1981]. ISBN 978-978-132-572-4.
- Adventures of Tulu, the Little Monkey. Nwapa. 1980.
- Busy Bee Number Workbook. 1980.
- Only Bread for Eze. Fourth Dimension. 1980. ISBN 978-978-156-066-8.
- Eme Goes to School. 1979.

== See also ==
Nigerian woman novelists

- Chimamanda Ngozi Adichie
- Buchi Emecheta
- Flora Nwapa
- Karen King-Aribisala
- Adaobi Tricia Nwaubani
- Chidera Okolie
- Taiwo Odubiyi
- Adaora Lily Ulasi
- Akachi Adimora-Ezeigbo
- Nnedi Okorafor
- Chika Unigwe
- Sefi Atta
- Helen Oyeyemi
- Chinelo Okparanta
- Lola Shoneyin
- Chibundu Onuzo
