= Purity Ada Uchechukwu =

Nigerian hispanist

- Born: 1971 (age 54–55); Lagos, Nigeria
- Education: University of Bamberg
- Occupation: Hispanist

Purity Ada Uchechukwu (born 1971) is a Nigerian Hispanist, an associate professor of Spanish at the Department of Modern European Languages, Nnamdi Azikiwe University, Awka. Her linguistic research focuses on the Afro-Hispanic people, Spanish as a second language and its role in Africa and the United States. Uchechukwu is one of the motivating forces behind Hispanist scholarship in English-speaking sub-Saharan Africa.

== Early life and education ==
Purity Ada Uchechukwu was born in Lagos, Nigera, in 1971. After graduating with a master's degree in Spanish from the University of Bamberg, she obtained a doctorate from the university in 2010, focusing on philology of Romance languages and writing her thesis on "A Corpus-Based Analysis of Igbo and Spanish Copula Verbs."

== Career ==
Uchechukwu returned to Nigeria to work as a Spanish professor at Nnamdi Azikiwe University, in its Department of Modern European Languages. She is the editor of the university's peer-reviewed Journal of Modern European Language and Literatures.

Her research focuses on teaching Spanish as a second language and on Spanish in the United States. In 2014, she contributed to the Instituto Cervantes' book La enseñanza del español en África Subsahariana ("The Teaching of Spanish in Sub-Saharan Africa"), writing on the status of the Spanish language in Nigeria. She is a member of the American Association of Teachers of Spanish and Portuguese and serves on the board of Open Journals Nigeria. Her role as a Hispanist researcher in an English-speaking sub-Saharan African country distinguishes her, as she explores in her 2017 paper "Spanish in Sub-Saharan Africa: Whither Nigeria?"

She is married to Chinedu Uchechukwu, a fellow professor at Nnamdi Azikiwe University.

== Selected works ==
- "A Corpus-Based Analysis of Igbo and Spanish Copula Verbs," doctoral thesis, 2010
- "Spanish in the United States as an Example of the Interaction between Language, Politics and Ethnicity," UJAH: Unizik Journal of Arts and Humanities, 2011
- "The Transitivity of Psych Verbs in Spanish and Igbo" in The Transitivity Problem of the Igbo Verb, 2012
- "La situación del español en Nigeria" in La enseñanza del español en África Subsahariana, 2014
- "The Prototypical Igbo Copula Verb," Igbo Language Studies Series, 2015
- "Afro-Hispanics and Self-Identity: The Gods to the Rescue?," Ogirisi: A New Journal of African Studies, 2016
- "Spanish in Sub-Saharan Africa: Whither Nigeria?," UJAH: Unizik Journal of Arts and Humanities, 2017
- "A Proposal for Afro-Hispanic Peoples and Culture as General Studies Course in African Universities," Humanities, 2019
- "Is Spanish as a Heritage Language in the US Endangered?," International Journal of Humanities & Social Studies, 2019
- "An Analysis of '(Pre)parados', 'Mileurista', 'Ni-ni' as used to describe the Young Unemployed in Spain," KIU Interdisciplinary Journal of Humanities and Social Sciences, 2023
