= Womanism =

Intersectional feminist movement

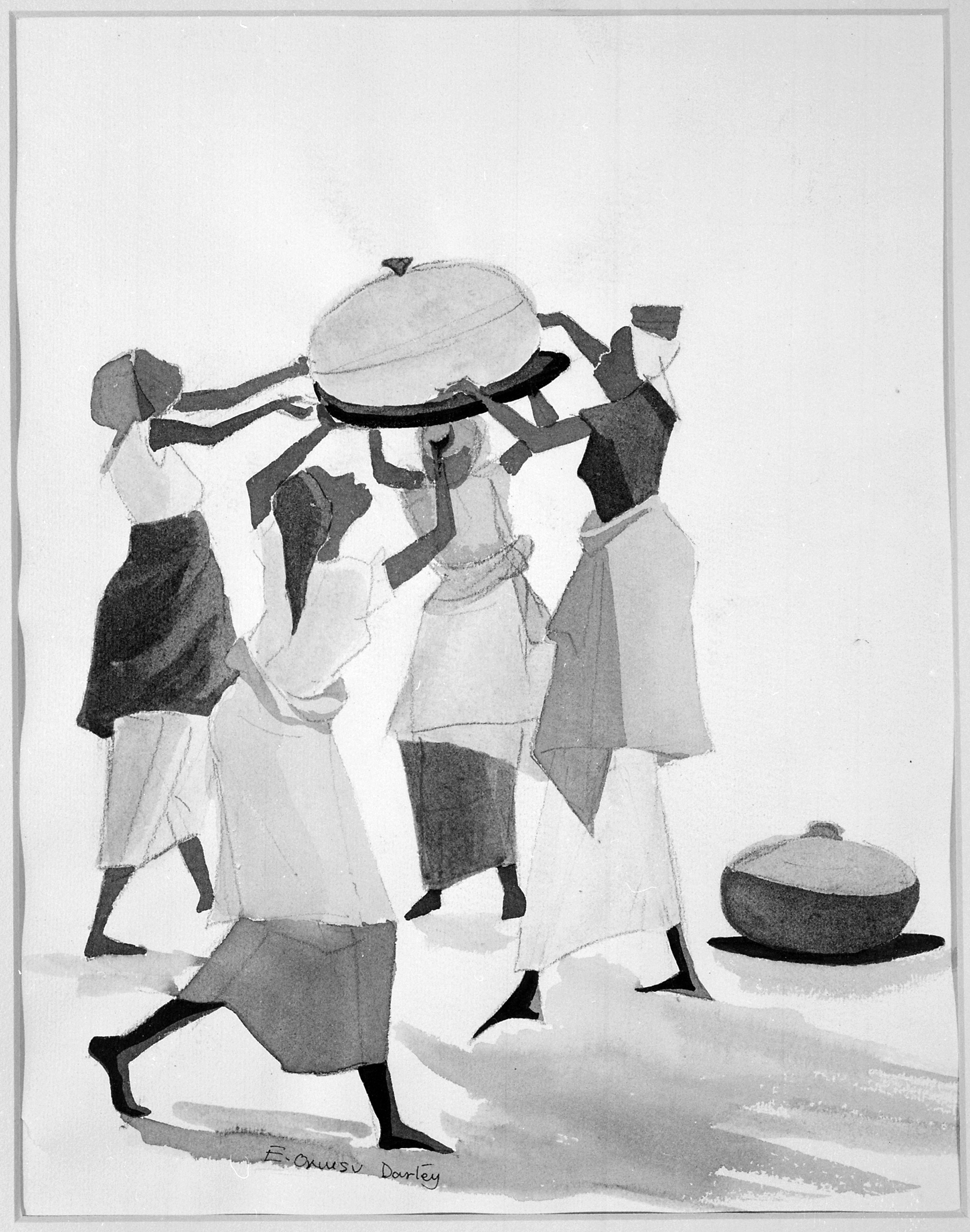
A depiction of black female unity as a core value of womanism

Womanism is a feminist movement, primarily championed by Black feminists, originating in the work of African American author Alice Walker in her 1983 book In Search of Our Mothers' Gardens. Walker coined the term "womanist" in the short story "Coming Apart" in 1979. Her initial use of the term evolved to envelop a spectrum of issues and perspectives facing black women and others. Walker defined "womanism" as embracing the courage, audacity, and self-assured demeanor of Black women, alongside their love for other women, themselves, and all of humanity. Since its inception by Walker, womanism has expanded to encompass various domains, giving rise to concepts such as Africana womanism and womanist theology or spirituality.

Womanism can be applied as a social theory based on the history and everyday experiences of Black women. According to womanist scholar Layli Maparyan (Phillips), womanist theory seeks to "restore the balance between people and the environment/nature and reconcil[e] human life with the spiritual dimension."

== Theory ==
Womanist theory, while diverse, holds at its core that mainstream feminism is a movement led by white women to serve white women's goals and can often be indifferent to, or even in opposition to, the needs of Black women. Feminism does not inherently render white women non-racist, while womanism places anti-racism at its core. Both the empowerment of women and the upholding of Black cultural values are seen as important to Black women's existence. In this view, the very definition of "the feminine" and "femininity" must be re-examined and contextualized. While third-wave feminism shares this concern with the more recently coined term, intersectionality, the two concepts differ in the valuation they place on intersectionality within their respective theoretical frameworks. Womanism supports the idea that the culture of the woman, which in this case is the focal point of intersection as opposed to class or some other characteristic, is not an element of her identity but rather is the lens through which her identity exists. As such, a woman's Blackness is not a component of her feminism. Instead, her Blackness is the lens through which she understands her feminist/womanist identity.

Womanist theory grew in large part out of the perceived indifference of the feminist movement towards the concerns of Black women. Early feminist activism around suffrage (first-wave feminism) in the United States largely excluded non-white women, as non-white women were not seen as feminine/female in the same ways as white women and therefore did not merit full inclusion.

The rise of second-wave feminism brought greater inclusivity of non-white women within the movement. However, white feminists equated this inclusion with "colorblindness" and preferred to deemphasize racial issues in favor of focusing exclusively on gender concerns. An inability to reconcile this division ultimately hampered the ability of white and non-white feminists to create a functional interracial movement. As a result of this disconnect between the groups, a third-wave feminism began that incorporated the concepts of intersectionality and womanism.

The historic exclusion of Black women from the broader feminist movement has resulted in two interpretations of womanism. Some womanists believe that the experience of Black women will not be validated by feminists to be equal to the experience of white women because of the problematic way in which some feminists treated Blackness throughout history. As such, womanists do not see womanism as an extension of feminism, but rather as a theoretical framework which exists independent of feminist theory. This is a departure from the thinking of Black feminists who have carved their own space in feminism through academia and activism.

However, not all womanists hold this view of womanism as distinct from feminism. The earliest conception of womanism is expressed in Alice Walker's statement "womanism is to feminism as purple is to lavender". Under this rubric, the theories appear intimately tied, with womanism as the broad umbrella under which feminism falls.

== Phases of the theory ==
=== Womanist (1979) ===
Author and poet Alice Walker first used the term "womanist" in her short story "Coming Apart", in 1979, and later in In Search of our Mothers' Gardens: Womanist Prose (1983). Walker defined a "womanist" as a Black feminist or feminist of color. The term comes from the Black folk expression of mothers to female children, 'You acting womanish', referring to grown-up behavior. The womanish girl exhibits willful, courageous, and outrageous behavior that is considered to be beyond the scope of societal norms. She goes on to say that a womanist is also:

A woman who loves other women, sexually and/or nonsexually. Appreciates and prefers women's culture, women's emotional flexibility [...] and women's strength. [...] Committed to survival and wholeness of entire people, male and female. Not a separatist, except periodically, for health [...] Loves music. Loves dance. Loves the moon. Loves the Spirit [...] Loves struggle. Loves the folk. Loves herself. Regardless. Womanist is to feminist as purple is to lavender.

According to Walker, while feminism is incorporated into womanism, it is also instinctively pro-humankind; womanism is a broader category that includes feminism as a subtype. The focus of the theory is not on gender inequality, but race- and class-based oppression. She sees womanism as a theory/movement for the survival of the Black race; a theory that takes into consideration the experiences of Black women, Black culture, Black myths, spiritual life, and orality. Walker's much cited phrase, "womanist is to feminist as purple is to lavender", suggests that feminism is a component beneath the much larger ideological umbrella of womanism.

Walker's definition also holds that womanists are universalists. This philosophy is further invoked by her metaphor of a garden where all flowers bloom equally. A womanist is committed to the survival of both males and females and desires a world where men and women can coexist, while maintaining their cultural distinctiveness. This inclusion of men provides Black women with an opportunity to address gender oppression without directly attacking men.

A third definition provided by Walker pertains to the sexuality of the women portrayed in her review of Gifts of Power: The Writings of Rebecca Jackson. Here, she argues that the best term to describe Rebecca Jackson, a Black Shaker who leaves her husband and goes on to live with her white Shaker companion, would be a womanist, because it is a word that affirms the connection to the world, regardless of sexuality. The seemingly contrasting interpretations of womanism given by Walker validate the experiences of African-American women, while promoting a visionary perspective for the world based on said experiences.

Much of Alice Walker's progeny admit that while she is the creator of the term, Walker fails to consistently define the term and often contradicts herself. At some points she portrays womanism as a more inclusive revision of Black feminism as it is not limited to Black women and focuses on the woman as a whole. Later in life, she appears to begin to regret this peace-seeking and inclusive form of womanism due to the constant and consistent prejudice inflicted upon Black women, specifically those whose voices had yet to be validated by both white women and Black men.

=== Womanism (1985) ===
Chikwenye Okonjo Ogunyemi is a Nigerian literary critic who, in 1985, published the article "Womanism: The Dynamics of the Contemporary Black Female Novel in English," which described her interpretation of womanism. She asserts that the womanist vision is to answer the ultimate question of how to equitably share power among the races and between the sexes. She arrived at her interpretation of the term independently of Alice Walker's definition, yet there are several overlaps between the two ideologies. In alignment with Walker's definition focusing on Blackness and womanhood, Ogunyemi writes, "black womanism is a philosophy that celebrates black roots, the ideals of black life, while giving a balanced presentation of black womandom".

Rather than citing gender inequality as the source of Black oppression, Ogunyemi takes a separatist stance much like Hudson-Weems, and dismisses the possibility of reconciliation of white feminists and Black feminists on the grounds of the intractability of racism. She uses a few examples of how feminists write about Blackness and African Blackness specifically to make salient the need for an African conception of womanism. These critiques include the use of Blackness as a tool to forward feminist ideals without also forwarding ideals related to Blackness, the thought that Western feminism is a tool which would work in African nations without acknowledging cultural norms and differences, and a co-opting of things that African women have been doing for centuries before the western notion of feminism into Western feminism.

Ogunyemi finds her conception of womanism's relationship with men at the cross roads of Walker's and Hudson-Weems'. Walker's expresses a communal opportunity for men while acknowledging how they can be dangerous to the womanist community. Hudson-Weems' conception refuses to see the Africana man as an enemy, disregarding the harm that Africana men have imparted on to the community.

=== Africana womanism (1995) ===
Clenora Hudson-Weems is credited with coining the term Africana womanism. In 1995, the publication of her book, Africana Womanism: Reclaiming Ourselves sent shock waves through the Black nationalism community and established her as an independent thinker. Hudson-Weems rejects feminism as the theology of Africana women, that is to say women of the African diaspora, because it is philosophically rooted in Eurocentric ideals. Hudson-Weems identifies further differences between womanism and feminism being; womanism is "family-oriented" and focuses on race, class, and gender, while feminism is "female-oriented" and strictly focuses on biological sex-related issues women and girls face, globally.

She further asserts that it is impossible to incorporate the cultural perspectives of African women into the feminism ideal due to the history of slavery and racism in America. Furthermore, Weems rejects feminism's characterization of the man as the enemy. She claims that this does not connect with Africana women as they do not see Africana men as the enemy. Instead the enemy is the oppressive force that subjugates the Africana man, woman, and child. She claims that feminism's masculine-feminine binary comes from a lack of additional hardship placed on women by their circumstances (i.e. race and socio-economic) as feminism was founded to appeal to upper-class white women.

She also distances the Africana woman from Black feminism by demarcating the latter as distinctly African-American which is in turn distinctly Western. She also critiques Black feminism as a subset of feminism needing the validation of white feminists for their voices to be heard. She claims that feminism will never truly accept Black feminists, but instead relegate them to the fringes of the feminist movement.

She ultimately claims that the matriarchs of the Black feminist movement will never be put into the same conversation as the matriarchs of the feminist movement. A large part of her work mirrors separatist Black Nationalist discourse, because of the focus on the collective rather than the individual as the forefront of her ideology. Hudson-Weems refutes Africana womanism as an addendum to feminism, and asserts that her ideology differs from Black feminism and Alice Walker's womanism.

== Ideologies ==
In the context of womanist theory, ideologies refer to the overarching belief systems, worldviews, and frameworks of thought that underpin and guide the perspectives, actions, and principles of womanists. These ideologies are integral to understanding womanism as a social and philosophical movement that centers the experiences of Black women, as well as the broader struggles for justice, equity, and empowerment.

Womanism has various definitions and interpretations. At its broadest definition, it is a universalist ideology for all women, regardless of color. A womanist is, according to Alice Walker's 1979 story "Coming Apart", an African-American heterosexual woman willing to utilize wisdom from African-American lesbians about how to improve sexual relationships and avoid being sexually objectified. In the context of men's destructive use of pornography and their exploitation of Black women as pornographic objects, a womanist is also committed to "the survival and wholeness of an entire people, male and female" through confronting oppressive forces.

Walker's much cited phrase, "womanist is to feminist as purple is to lavender", suggests that Walker considers feminism as a component of the wider ideological umbrella of womanism. It focuses on the unique experiences, struggles, needs, and desires of not just Black women, but all women of color in addition to critically addressing the dynamics of the conflict between the mainstream feminist, the Black feminist, the African feminist, and the Africana womanist movement. However, there is Black nationalist discourse prevalent within womanist work and for this reason scholars are divided between associating womanism with other similar ideologies such as Black feminism and Africana womanism or taking the stance that the three are inherently incompatible.

=== Black feminism ===
The Black feminist movement was formed in response to the needs of women who were racially underrepresented by the Women's Movement and sexually oppressed by the Black Liberation Movement. Black feminist scholars assert that African-American women are doubly disadvantaged in the social, economic, and political sphere, because they face discrimination on the basis of both race and gender. Black women felt that their needs were being ignored by both movements and they struggled to identify with either based on race or gender. African-American women who use the term Black feminism attach a variety of interpretations to it.

One such interpretation is that Black feminism addresses the needs of African-American women that the feminism movement largely ignores. Feminism, as Black feminist theorist Pearl Cleage defines it, is "the belief that women are full human beings capable of participation and leadership in the full range of human activities—intellectual, political, social, sexual, spiritual, and economic". With this definition, the feminist agenda can be said to encompass different issues ranging from political rights to educational opportunities within a global context. The Black feminist agenda seeks to streamline these issues and focuses on those that are the most applicable to African-American women.

=== Africana womanism ===
Clenora Hudson-Weems's Africana womanism arose from a nationalist Africana studies concept. In Africana Womanism: Reclaiming Ourselves, Hudson-Weems explores the limitations of feminist theory and explains the ideas and activism of different African women who have contributed to womanist theory. At its core, Africana womanism rejects feminism because it is set up in a way as to promote the issues of white women over the issues of Black women. Hudson-Weems argues that feminism will never be okay for Black women due to the implications of slavery and prejudice.

Weems professes womanism is separate from other feminism in that it has a different agenda, different priorities, and "focuses on the unique experiences, struggles, needs, and desires of Africana women." She further asserts that the relationship between a Black man and a Black woman is significantly different from the relationship between a white man and a white woman, because the white woman battles the white man for subjugating her, but the black woman battles all oppressive forces that subjugate her, her children, and the black man.

She further asserts that racism forced African-American men and African-American women to assume unconventional gender roles. In this context, the desire of mainstream feminism to dismantle traditional gender roles becomes inapplicable to the Black experience. Unlike womanism, though closely related, Africana womanism is an ideology designed specifically with women of African descent in mind. It is grounded in African culture and focuses on the unique struggles, needs, and desires of African women. Based on this reasoning, Africana womanism posits race- and class-based oppression as far more significant than gender-based oppression.

== Womanist identifications ==
Identity and identifications are related concepts, but they have distinct meanings in the context of social and cultural studies. Identity represents the deeper, multifaceted understanding of who a person or group is, while identifications are the specific labels or categories that are applied to express or communicate aspects of that identity. Identifications can be one of the ways people express and define their identities, but they do not capture the entirety of a person's or group's identity. Womanist identifications have been a source of discussion and debate, particularly when individuals or groups feel that the labels assigned to them do not fully represent their complex identities.

In her introduction to The Womanist Reader, Layli Phillips contends that despite womanism's characterization, its main concern is not the Black woman per se but rather the Black woman is the point of origin for womanism. The basic tenets of womanism includes a strong, self-authored spirit of activism that is especially evident in literature. Womanism has been such a polarizing movement for women that it has managed to step outside of the Black community and extend itself into non-white communities. "Purple is to Lavender" is applied to non-Black contexts by professors Dimpal Jain (California State University, Northridge) and Caroline Sotello Viernes Turner (Mary Lou Fulton Teachers College, Arizona State University).

Some scholars view womanism as a subcategory of feminism while others argue that it is actually the other way around. Purple is to Lavender explores the concept that womanism is to feminism as purple is to lavender, that feminism falls under the umbrella of womanism. In "Purple is to Lavender", Dimpal Jain and Caroline Turner discuss their experiences as non-white women in faculty. They experienced a great deal of discrimination because they were minorities. Jain is South Asian, while Caroline identifies as Filipino.

They go on to describe the concept of "The Politics of Naming" which shapes the reason for why they prefer womanism as opposed to feminism Jain states: "I knew that the term feminism was contested and that I did not like how it fit in my mouth. It was uncomfortable and scratchy, almost like a foreign substance that I was being forced to consume as the white women continued to smile with comforting looks of familiarity and pride"

Here, Turner makes it well known that she feels as though feminism is something that is forced upon her. She feels that she cannot completely identify with feminism. It is also important to note Jain's statement that "The crux of the politics of naming is that names serve as identifiers and are not neutral when attached to social movements, ideas, and groups of people. Naming and labeling become politicized acts when they serve to determine any type of membership at a group level."

This statement illustrates that if an individual identifies with feminism they may do so for particular reasons. However, those reasons may not be evident to the general public because of the connotation that the word feminism brings with it in terms of social movements, ideas, and groups of people. Individuals want something to identify with that expresses and supports their beliefs holistically. They want something that they can embrace to the fullest without any hint of regret. Similarly, Alice Walker even states: "I don't choose womanism because it is 'better' than feminism ... I choose it because I prefer the sound, the feel, the fit of it... because I share the old ethnic-American habit of offering society a new word when the old word it is using fails to describe behavior and change that only a new word can help it more fully see"

For a majority of Black women feminism has failed to accurately and holistically describe them as individuals to the world that surrounds them. They feel as though it takes something new that is not already bound to a predetermined master in order to capture this new movement. Womanism is something that Alice Walker can completely identify with without having second thoughts; it feels natural to her. Feminism does not. When distinguishing between feminism and womanism it is important to remember that many women find womanism easier to identify with. In addition, a key component of a womanist discourse is the role that spirituality and ethics has on ending the interlocking oppression of race, gender, and class that circumscribes the lives of African-American women.

=== Literature and activism ===
Womanist literature and activism are two areas that are largely interrelated, with each having a considerable effect on the other. A major tenet of womanist literature and activism is the idea that Black activists and Black authors should separate themselves from the feminist ideology. This stems from assertions by Kalenda Eaton, Chikwenye Okonjo Ogunyemi, and numerous other womanist theologians that the goal of a womanist should be to promote the issues affecting not just Black women, but Black men and other groups that have been subjected to discrimination or impotence. In the words of Chikwenye Okonjo Ogunyemi, a white woman writer may be a feminist, but a Black woman writer is likely to be a womanist. That is, she recognizes that along with battling for sexual equality, she must also incorporate race, economics, culture, and politics within her philosophy.

In Kalenda Eaton's, Womanism, Literature and the Transformation of the Black Community, Black women writers are portrayed as both activists and visionaries for change in the Black Community following the Civil Rights Movement. She interweaves the historical events of African-American history with the development of Afro-Politico womanism in a bid to create a haven for Black female activism within the Black community. This Afro-Politico womanism veers from the traditional feminist goal of gender equality within a group and rather seeks to fight for the men and women whose civil rights are infringed upon. While Eaton takes the stance that Black women were largely excluded from the more prominent positions within the Black Movement, she argues that Black women activists had the greatest effect in small-scale grassroots protests within their communities.

Using various characters from Toni Morrison's Song of Solomon, Alice Walker's Meridian, Toni Cade Bambara's The Salt Eaters, and Paule Marshall's The Chosen Place, the Timeless People as symbols of the various political agendas and issues that were prevalent within The Black Movement, Eaton draws upon the actions of the protagonists to illustrate solutions to the problems of disgruntlement and disorganization within the movement. Often the main task of these literary activists was to empower the impoverished masses—defined by Eaton as mainly Southern African-Americans, and they used the Black middle class as a model for the possibility of social mobility within the African-American community. A common theme within womanist literature is the failure of Black women writers to identify with feminist thought. Womanism becomes the concept that binds these novelists together.

Audre Lorde in The Master's Tools Will Never Dismantle the Master's House criticizes second-wave feminism, arguing that women were taught to ignore their differences, or alternately to let their differences divide them. Lorde never used the word "womanist" or "womanism" in her writing or in descriptions of herself, but her work has helped to further the concept. As she pointed out, traditional second-wave feminism often focused too narrowly on the concerns of white, heterosexual women, with the concerns of Black women and lesbians often being ignored.

=== Spirituality and womanist theology ===
Womanist spirituality has six identifying characteristics—it is eclectic, synthetic, holistic, personal, visionary, and pragmatic. It draws from its resources and uses the summation of said resources to create a whole from multiple parts. Although it is ultimately defined by self, womanist spirituality envisions the larger picture and exists to solve problems and end injustice. Emilie Townes, a womanist theologian, further asserts that womanist spirituality grows out of individual and communal reflection on African-American faith and life. She explains that it is not grounded in the notion that spirituality is a force but rather a practice separate from who we are moment by moment.

One of the main characteristics of womanism is its religious aspect, commonly thought of as Christian. This connotation portrays spiritual Black womanists as "church going" women who play a vital role in the operation of the church. In William's article "Womanist Spirituality Defined" she discusses how womanist spirituality is directly connected to an individual's experiences with God. For instance, Williams declares that "the use of the term spirituality in this paper speaks of the everyday experiences of life and the way in which we relate to and interpret God at work in those experiences".

This connotation is disputed in Monica Coleman's Roundtable Discussion: "Must I Be a Womanist?" where she focuses on the shortcomings of womanism that result from how individuals have historically described womanism. This holistic discussion of womanism is the result of a roundtable discussion. Coleman, who initiated the discussion, describes her thoughts on why she prefers Black feminism as opposed to womanism, and she also discusses the limited scope that womanist religious scholarship embodies. Coleman offers deep insight into the spiritual aspect of womanism when she declares that, "Intentionally or not, womanists have created a Christian hegemonic discourse within the field".

Here Coleman argues that the majority of womanists have defined womanist spirituality as Christian. A specific example of this occurs in Alice Walker's "Everyday Use", when the mother suddenly gains the courage to take a stand against her spoiled daughter as she declares, "When I looked at her like that something hit me in the top of my head and ran down to the soles of my feet. Just like when I'm in church and the spirit of God touches me and I get happy and shout".

However, Coleman provides a counter example to this assumption, writing: "How, for example, might a womanist interpret the strength Tina Turner finds in Buddhism and the role her faith played in helping her to leave a violent relationship?" Coleman believes that the assumption of Christianity as the default in womanism is a limited view. She asserts that Womanist religious scholarship has the ability to spread across a variety of paradigms and traditions, and can represent and support a radical womanist spirituality.

==== Ethics ====
Ethics is a branch of philosophy. Philosophy is a broad field of study that explores fundamental questions about knowledge, existence, reality, and values. Within philosophy, ethics is the specific branch that focuses on questions related to moral principles, values, and the rightness or wrongness of human actions. Ethical philosophy delves into topics such as moral theories, ethical dilemmas, moral reasoning, and the nature of morality itself. It seeks to provide a rational and systematic framework for understanding and evaluating ethical questions and decisions.

Womanist ethics is a religious discipline that examines the ethical theories concerning human agency, action, and relationship. At the same time, it rejects social constructions that have neglected the existence of a group of women that have bared the brunt of injustice and oppression. Its perspective is shaped by the theological experiences of African-American women. With the use of analytic tools, the effect of race, class, gender, and sexuality on the individual and communal perspective is examined. Womanist ethic provides an alternative to Christian and other religious ethics while utilizing the elements of critique, description, and construction to assess the power imbalance and patriarchy that has been used to oppress women of color and their communities.

Katie Cannon's "The Emergence of Black Feminist Consciousness" was the first publication to speak directly about womanist ethics. In this article, Cannon argues that the perspectives of Black women are largely ignored in various religious and academic discourses. Jacquelyn Grant expands on this point by asserting that Black women concurrently experience the three oppressive forces of racism, sexism, and classism. Black feminist theory has been used by womanist ethics to explain the lack of participation of African-American women and men in academic discourse. Patricia Collins credits this phenomenon to prevalence of white men determining what should or should not be considered valid discourse and urges for an alternative mode of producing knowledge that includes the core themes of Black female consciousness.

== Critiques ==
A major ongoing critique about womanist scholarship is the failure of many scholars to critically address homosexuality within the Black community. Alice Walker's protagonist in "Coming Apart" uses writings from two African-American womanists, Audre Lorde and Luisah Teish, to support her argument that her husband should stop consuming pornography, and posts quotes from lesbian poet Lorde above her kitchen sink. In Search of Our Mothers' Gardens states that a womanist is "a woman who loves another woman, sexually and/or non-sexually", yet despite "Coming Apart" and In Search of Our Mother's Gardens, there is very little literature linking womanism to lesbian or bisexual issues. Womanist theologian Renee Hill cites Christian influences as a source of this heterosexism and homophobia.

Rev. Kelly Brown Douglas also sees the influence of the Black church, and its male leadership, as a reason for the community at large having little regard for queer women of color. Black feminist critic Barbara Smith blames this lack of support on the Black community's reluctance to come to terms with homosexuality. On the other hand, there is also an increase in the criticism of heterosexism within womanist scholarship. Christian womanist theologian Pamela R. Lightsey, in her book Our Lives Matter: A Womanist Queer Theology (2015), writes, "To many people, we are still perverts. To many, the black pervert is the most dangerous threat to the American ideal. Because the black conservative bourgeoisie has joined the attack on our personhood, black LGBTQ persons cannot allow the discourse to be controlled such that our existence within the black community is denied or made invisible."

An additional critique lies within the ambivalence of womanism. In African womanism, the term is associated with Black nationalist discourse and the separatist movement. Patricia Collins argues that this exaggerates racial differences by promoting homogeneous identity. This is a sharp contrast to the universalist model of womanism that is championed by Walker. The continued controversy and dissidence within the various ideologies of womanism serves only to draw attention away from the goal of ending race and gender-based oppression.

== See also ==
Stephanie Mitchem

- Africana womanism
- All the Women Are White, All the Blacks Are Men, But Some of Us Are Brave
- Black feminism
- Daughters of Africa
- Katie Geneva Cannon
- Delores S. Williams
- Patricia Hill Collins
- Stacey M. Floyd-Thomas
- Emilie Townes
- Stephanie Mitchem
- Triple oppression
- Womanist theology
