= Olamidotun Votu-Obada =

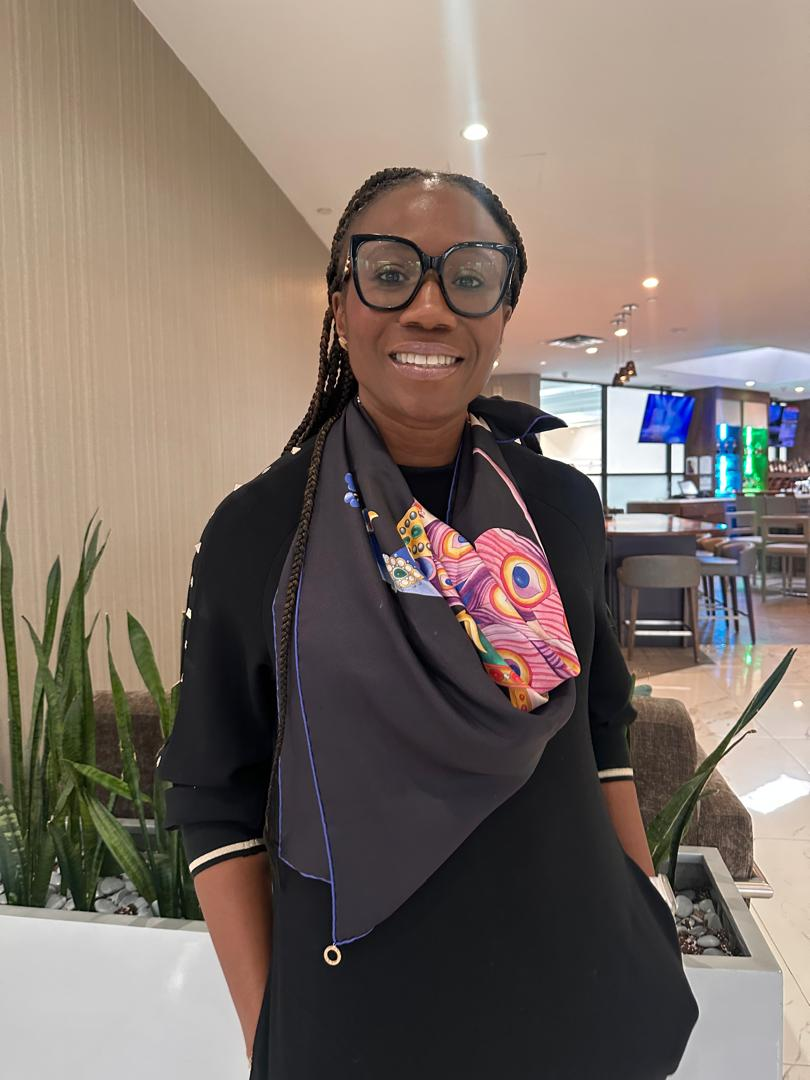
Olamidotun Votu-Obada

Olamidotun Votu-Obada is a Nigerian entrepreneur, children's book author, and public speaker. She is the Managing Partner of Filii Magna Limited, a specialized consultancy and travel concierge company, and the founding partner of The Fun Central Company, a prominent family entertainment company in Nigeria. Votu-Obada holds degrees in Business Economics and International Financial Economics from the University of Warwick and the University of Reading, respectively.

== Career ==
She began her career as a Management Consultant and later ventured into entrepreneurship, establishing successful businesses in both the consultancy and entertainment sectors. As a children's book author, Votu-Obada has captivated young readers with her imaginative storytelling. She is also a sought-after public speaker, known for her engaging personality and insightful presentations. In 2019, she was recognized as one of Business Days' "50 Most Inspiring Women," highlighting her significant contributions to the business and entrepreneurial spheres.
