= Charry Ada Onwu =

Nigerian writer

- Born: Nigeria
- Citizenship: Nigerian
- Occupations: Filmmaker, Producer
- Known for: Film production and storytelling

Charry Ada Onwu-Otuyelu is a Nigerian literature writer and the first female Director of Imo State Council for Arts and Culture. She is from Amaigbo in Imo State. She is a fiction writer of children's literature. She is an ex-soldier that worked with the Armed Forces medical service during the Biafran war. Her themes include folktales and history.

Her keen interest in folktales and history defined the direction of her research, which mostly revolved around history and sociology. This also informed the themes of some of her works, which include ‘Catastrophe’, ‘Our Grannies Tales’, ‘Adobi’, ‘Triumph of Destiny’, ‘One Bad Turn’, ‘Ada Marries a Palm Tree’, ‘Amaigbo Kwenu: History of My Town’, ‘Good Morning Mr Kolanut’, among others.

One of the early female voices to take the genre of children literature very seriously, Charry Ada Onwu-Otuyelu ventured into creative literature in the early 1980s. Among her earliest works was ‘Ifeanyi and Obi’, which won the children literature award in 1988. She would go ahead in the course of her writing career to win several other literary awards with her outstanding works written for children.

Charry was a nurse by profession, having got her nursing professional qualifications from University Teaching Hospital Ibadan and Maternity Hospital Lagos. I was told she ran a clinic/maternity somewhere in Obinze, near Owerri, the Imo State capital. I would also learn from my friend Chukwubuike that she was also a civil war veteran, having served with the Biafran Armed Forces Medical Service during the Nigeria-Biafra Civil War (1967–70). But it was her writings that defined her essence, much like Cyprian Ekwensi and Anezi Okoro who, even though coming from the medical background, would become giants in the literary world.

== Works ==
- Good Morning Mr. Kolanut! (2006; co-authored by Ama Boatemaa, Charry Ada Onwu, Samuel Boamah)
- Triumph of Destiny (2003)
- Amaigbo Kwenu: History, Legend & Myth of Amaigbo (1988)
- Catastrophe: A Novel (1982)
- One Bad Turn (1982)
- Ifeanyi and Obi (1982)
