= Sacred Heart School of Theology =

Sacred Heart Seminary and School of Theology
- Former names: Sacred Heart Monastery
- Type: Seminary
- Established: 1932
- Religious affiliation: Priests of the Sacred Heart
- Location: Franklin, Wisconsin, United States
- Website: www.shsst.edu

The Sacred Heart Seminary and School of Theology is a Roman Catholic seminary in Hales Corners, Wisconsin. It is associated with the Priests of the Sacred Heart, a Catholic religious community of priests and lay brothers founded in France in 1884 and working in the US since the early 20th century.

When the seminary program was established in 1932, the school was known as Sacred Heart Monastery. It offered classes in philosophy and theology for seminarians who were members of the Priests of the Sacred Heart.

The seminary is accredited by the Association of Theological Schools in the United States and Canada.

== History ==
In its early programs beginning in 1932, the seminary offered both philosophy and theology classes to seminarians affiliated with Priests of the Sacred Heart, which included laymen. In 1955, the philosophy program was moved elsewhere. The seminary was dedicated to theological preparation for men preparing for priesthood. In 1968, construction of the existing building was completed across the street from the original school. In 1972 the name was changed to Sacred Heart School of Theology.

In 1973 Sacred Heart received approval to accept second-career presbyteral candidates who are sponsored by dioceses or religious congregations. It is the largest seminary in the US to accept men over the age of 30 for training for the priesthood. The candidates come from across the United States and Canada. The seminary offers a Master of Divinity to men who are in a program of priestly formation.
