= Stephen Kekeghe =

Nigerian writer (born 1982)

Stephen Ese Kekeghe (born 10 October 1982) is a Nigerian writer, scholar and academic. His poetry collection Rumbling Sky (2020) is a joint winner of the Association of Nigerian Authors' Prize for Poetry in 2021, and his play Broken Edges (2023) was shortlisted for the Association of Nigerian Authors' Prize for Drama in 2023.

== Early life and education ==
Kekeghe was born into an Urhobo family in 1982 in Imode, Delta State, Nigeria.

He completed his primary education at Baba-Ido Primary School in Okwagbe, Delta State, in 1995, and his secondary education at St. Vincent’s College, Okwagbe, in 2001, where he served as editor of the college press club.

Kekeghe obtained a Bachelor of Arts degree in English and Literary Studies from Delta State University, Abraka, in 2007. He later earned a master’s degree in literature from the University of Ibadan in 2012 and completed his PhD in Literature and Medicine at the same institution in 2018.

He has held teaching positions at the College of Education, Warri, and Ajayi Crowther University, Oyo. While at Ajayi Crowther University, he founded the ACU Creative Writers’ Club in 2021 and subsequently served as Head of the Department of English.

Kekeghe is currently a faculty member in the Department of English and Literary Studies at Delta State University, Abraka, where he teaches African Literature, Literature and Popular Culture, and Medical Humanities. His work has appeared in journals and edited volumes published by Taylor & Francis, Brill, and Springer.

In 2020, he developed a theoretical framework known as Pathotextualism, which explores the representation of disease and clinical experience in literature and popular culture.

== Literary works ==
=== Published works ===
- Pond of Leeches (play, 2015)
- Rumbling Sky (poetry collection, 2020)
- Broken Edges (play, 2023)

=== Co-authored and co-edited books ===
- Abdullahi, Denja & Kekeghe, Stephen (Editors). Medicine and Literature Without Borders: Health and Social Justice in the Writings of Wale Okediran. Ibadan: Accessible Publishers Ltd, 2025.
- Omobowale, E. B. & Kekeghe, Stephen E. (Course Developers). ENG 801: Literature and Medicine. National Open University of Nigeria (NOUN).

=== Poetry ===
Kekeghe's poetry has appeared in several anthologies, including 22 Voices for WPD, (2022), Sorosoke: An #EndSARS Anthology, Rising Voices: Rhythms in Honour of Professor Remi Raji-Oyelade, Abraka Voices (2010) and Words Without Borders (2012).

== Scholarly contributions ==
Kekeghe has published contributions on medical humanities and postcolonial studies, including:

- Creativity and the Burden of Thoughts: Deconstructing Melancholia in Wumi Raji's Rolling Dreams (2017)
- Mental Health, Minority Discourse and Tanure Ojaide's Short Stories (2020)
- Political Ambition and Psychiatric Manifestations in Femi Osofisan's A Restless Run of Locusts (2021
- Art, Medicine and Public Health: Synergizing Humanistic and Medical Strategies in Managing a Pandemic (2022)
- Humour in the Euphemization of Depravities, Dread and Distress in Selected Nigerian Comic Skits of Sabinus (2025)
- Medical Narratives and Nollywood Films: Psychophysical Manifestations of Sickle Cell Anemia and Clinical Experiences in Tunde Kelani's Dazzling Mirage (2025)
- Nollywood and the Hybrid Postcolonial Space: Cultural Nationalism and Identities Construction in Kayode Kasum's Afamefuna (2025)

== Awards and recognition ==
Kekeghe has received several awards and nominations, including

- Certificate of Achievement, 5th USER Congress and Prize Awarding Festival, University of Tehran (2020)
- Joint Winner, Association of Nigerian Authors Prize for Poetry (2021) for Rumbling Sky
- Distinguished Scholar and Writer Award, Urhobo Progress Union (2022)
- Shortlisted, Association of Nigerian Authors Prize for Drama (2023) for Broken Edges
- Distinguished Head of Department Award, National Association of Students of English & Literary Studies, Ajayi Crowther University (2023)

== Personal life ==
Kekeghe is married to Abigail Kekeghe. They have three children: Emuesiri, Ebruphiyo and Erhuvwu.
