= Ejikeme Ikwunze =

Nigerian writer

Ejikeme Ikwunze (Mr. Football)
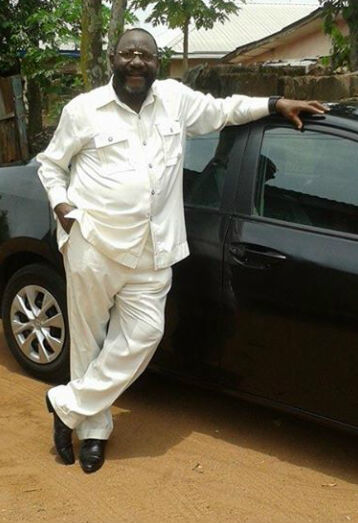
- Mr. Football
- Born: Umuahia, Nigeria
- Occupations: Football historian and statistician; sports administrator; author; football development consultant

Ejikeme Ikwunze //, popularly called Mr Football, is an international figure in Nigeria's sporting community. He is a sports columnist and contributes articles to several international sports magazines as well as Nigerian Newspapers including the National Ambassador, Vanguard, ThisDay and the Daily Champion. He also features as a sports commentator on several stations such as Federal Radio Corporation of Nigeria, the BCA Radio, Abia Television and Pacesetter Radio.

== Career ==
Ikwunze is a football historian and statistician. He has authored several books on the subject, including Olympic Football Tournaments, World Cup 1930–2010 – A Statistical Summary and World Cup Biographies. Some of his works have been recognised by FIFA and can be found in FIFA's Libraries. FIFA President Sepp Blatter has often acknowledged Ejikeme Ikwunze's works as being a valuable contribution to football history.

Ikwunze has had a career in public service first as a teacher in a public school and later as a sports administrator. He headed the Abia State Sports Council as Director of Sports for nearly a decade, a position which enabled him reposition and develop several games. He was a member of the 9-man Presidential Committee on reform of Nigeria Football set up by former President Olusegun Obasanjo.

Ikwunze is an authority on sports issues and is often a reference point for news reporters wishing to make a good headline story.

He is a former Special Adviser to the Governor of Abia State on Sports, and finds time by the side to work as a consultant to many sports bodies in Nigeria.

== Bibliography ==
- Olympic Football Tournaments
- World Cup 1930–2010: A Statistical Summary
- World Cup Biographies.
