= T. Ola Avoseh =

Nigerian historian

Theophilus Olabode Avoseh
- Born: March 21, 1908; Badagry
- Died: April 12, 1999 (aged 91)
- Occupation: Local historian
- Notable work: "A Short History of Badagry"; The History of St. Thomas's Church, Badagry, 1842–1970

Chief Theophilus Olabode Avoseh (born on 21 March 1908 – 12 April 1999), known as T. Ola Avoseh, was a local historian, writer and chief of Badagry, Lagos. He wrote several booklets and pamphlets in the English and Yoruba languages on aspects of the history and culture of Badagry and Epe towns in Lagos, Nigeria.

== Early life ==
T. Ola Avoseh was born to an Ogu father and an Awori mother in Badagry town. He grew up in Ajara Vedo community in Badagry. At age 4 in 1912, he started school at the popular St. Thomas' Primary School in Badagry. At 8 years of age in 1916, Avoseh was baptized in the Anglican faith at the Saint Thomas' Anglican Church, Badagry.

He spent 13 years in the school until 1925 due to demotion and ill-health. Side-by-side with his education, he learned carpentry from his father. In 1926 he dropped carpentry to become a teacher in his former school. In 1929, he sat for and passed the Standard VI examinations as an external candidate. His poor health, however, hindered him from securing admission to St. Andrew's College, Oyo; and he failed the Teachers' Higher Elementary Certificate examinations twice in 1932 and 1934. In effect, Avoseh did not succeed at furthering his education beyond the primary level. It was during this time as a schoolteacher that Avoseh wrote his book on Badagry. After teaching for 14 years, Avoseh lost his job in March 1941.

== Work and career ==
From 1941 until 1955, Avoseh worked for the Egun Awori Native Authority. In 1957, he opened a private primary school at Ajegunle and Apapa, and also started working for the Federal Ministry of Information and Home Affairs as a Cinema Commentator. While with the Ministry of Information and Home Affairs, he worked at Ibadan, Badagry, Epe, and Ijebu-Ode. It was during the period that Avoseh worked in Epe that he wrote one of his books. He retired from the government post at the mandatory age of 60 in 1968. In the 1960s and 1970s, Avoseh was engaged by the government in the management of schools and councils in Badagry. He continued to operate the school until the 1970s, when the government took over management of all private schools.

Avoseh was active in church work and local politics. He was the General Secretary of the Badagry branch of the Nigerian Youth Movement's political party from 1939 to 1941. He was also the founder and General Secretary of the Egun Awori Improvement Union in 1968. In the Saint Thomas' Church, Avoseh was confirmed and appointed a Lay Reader in October 1932. He later held several positions in the church, including Secretary to the Parochial Committee in Badagry (1933–1941); Secretary of the Lay Readers' Association (1965–1975); Conductor of Morning Prayer Band from 1966; the General Secretary of the Egbe Ogo Olorun Tan church society (1966–1977); and the Chairman of Lay Readers Association (1975 to 1980s).

In recognition of his diverse contributions to the town, Aholu C. D. Akran, the King of Badagry, conferred on Avoseh the chieftaincy title of Gbesiewu of Badagry in January 1974.

== Publications ==
- A Short History of Badagry (Lagos: Adeolu Press, 1938)
- Iwe li Ede Egun Pelu Itumo ni Ede Yoruba ati Gesi, (1959, reprinted in 1962; revised and printed again in 1982) [Trans. "The Egun Language, with its Yoruba and English Equivalent"]
- A Short History of Epe (Apapa: Adeolu Press, 1960)
- Iwe Ikomo Jade, Oruko Awon Ojo, Adura Ojojumo, Ojo ati Osu Ibimo, Ojo Lati Dawole Nkan ati Iwe Eri Ijo Ibi Omo (1960) [Trans. "Naming Ceremony, Daily Prayer Book, Child Birth, When to Start an Enterprise, and Birth Certificates"]
- Awon Oruko Egun Pelu Itumo Nwon li Ede Yoruba (Apapa: Adeolu Press, 1962, reprinted 1982)
- Iwe Isin Imale ni Ilu Agbadarigi (Apapa: Adeolu Press, 1964) [Trans. "Islam in Badagry"]
- The History of St. Thomas's Church, Badagry, 1842–1970 (Apapa: Adeolu Press, 1970)
- Iwe Itan Kukuru Egbe Ajumogbadura (Apapa: Adeolu Press, 1973) [Trans. "A History of the Prayer Group Society"]
- Biographical Sketches (Agege, Lagos: Ike-Olu Press, 1978)
- Ajara Dabi Eko (1983) [Trans. "Ajara Becomes Another Lagos"]
- The Historical Tree of Badagry under which the Early Missionaries Preached the Gospel of Christ (Apapa: Adeolu Press, 1984)
- Important Historical Places to be Visited in Badagry by the Tourist (1984)
- First Storey Building in Nigeria (1984)
- The First Christmas Day in Badagry (1984)
- Notes on the Fishing Industry in Badagry (1993)

== Legacy ==
Being a pioneering local historian of Badagry and Epe towns, several of Avoseh's works have been republished in peer-reviewed journals and books by professional Nigerian historian Toyin Falola. Avoseh's works have also been found to be very useful primary sources for several publications by other Nigerian historians, including A. I. Asiwaju and Hakeem Tijani.
