= Chuck Nduka-Eze =

Anglo-Nigerian lawyer

Chief Chuck Nduka-Eze (born 12 March 1963) is an Anglo-Nigerian lawyer, activist and entrepreneur. In 1999, he represented the Anioma Community at the special panel of The Human Rights Violation Investigation Commission of Nigeria (the Oputa Panel), in respect of the genocide they experienced during the Nigerian Civil War. He is the son of the nationalist, trade union activist, and lawyer Sylvester Nduka-Eze.

== Early life ==
Nduka-Eze was born to Sylvester Nduka-Eze, of Umuaji, Asaba (more commonly known as Nduka Eze) in London, on March 12, 1963. His father was a renowned nationalist, trade unionist, and workers' rights activist, who led the United African Company (UAC) workers strike of 1950. His mother, Rose Nduka-Eze, was a registered nurse and midwife, and the daughter of Obi Okechukwu Mordi of Umuonaje, Asaba. She was murdered in the course of the October 1967 Asaba massacre.

Chuck Nduka-Eze attended CMS Primary School, Asaba, between 1970 and 1975; CMS Grammar School, Lagos, between 1975 and 1980; and Thelveton Hall School, Diss, Norfolk, between 1980 and 1982. He studied at the University of Warwick, and then the University of Jos in Nigeria graduating with a Bachelor of Laws (Honours) Degree in 1987. He attended the Nigerian Law School between 1987 and 1988 and was admitted as a Solicitor and Advocate of the Supreme Court of Nigeria in 1988. He trained at the Middle Temple, London, and was called to the English Bar in 1990. He was also called to the bar of the State of California, in 1994.

== Professional career ==
He was a member of 2 Paper Buildings, Temple, London, headed by Sir Desmond De Silva QC - a common law chambers set- between 1990 and 1994. He was appointed a Senior Crown Counsel in the Crown Prosecution Service in 1994, and handled a wide range of prosecutions. One of these was R v Bridger [1994], in which he secured the conviction of a defendant who had vandalised the work of the popular artist, Damien Hirst; this case was later adapted as a BBC drama. He was also prosecuting counsel in R v Morris [1994], in which the defendant was found guilty of the harassment of the complainant, an employee of Conservative MP, Bill Cash. He was also prosecuting counsel in R v Devereux, involving an international rugby player.He returned to the bar in 1997 and practised in chambers till 1999, when he returned to Nigeria to serve as Company Secretary and Legal Adviser of Diamond Bank (now Access Bank), where he worked till 2001.

== Representation of the Anioma Community at the Oputa Panel ==
Upon constitution of the special panel of The Human Rights Violation Investigation Commission of Nigeria (the Oputa Panel), he was instructed by Emma Okocha, the author of the work 'Blood on the Niger', as counsel on a pro-bono basis, to represent Okocha and the Anioma community in Delta State, on the presentation of a genocide petition relating to the unlawful killings of civilians in Asaba and other communities of Anioma during the Nigerian Civil War. The panel heard several first-hand witnesses in support of the petition, and in conclusion, the Federal Government of Nigeria accepted the claims in the petition.

== Personal life ==
He is married to Fatima Laraba Nduka-Eze, (née Garba), a lawyer and the daughter of late Major-General Joseph Garba, former Nigerian Minister of Foreign Affairs and Permanent Representative to the United Nations. They have three children. Nduka-Eze holds the chieftaincy titles of 'Isama' of Asaba, 'Nwabunia' of Enugwu-Ukwu, and 'Ike Obodo' of Nteje.
