= Esther Bali =

Nigerian writer of folktale stories

Esther Jummai Bali (born 1947) is a Nigerian writer of folktale stories.

== Works ==
- It's Story Time (1987)
- Taroh Folktales (1990) which was adapted into a short 55 minute movie
- More Tales from Tarokland (1991)
- Plays from Tarok Folktales (1994)
- Tarok Folktales (1994)
- Learn, Join, and Colour (2000)
- Esther Bali: A Portrait of an Educationist (2000)
