= Chidera Okolie =

Nigerian writer (born 1993)

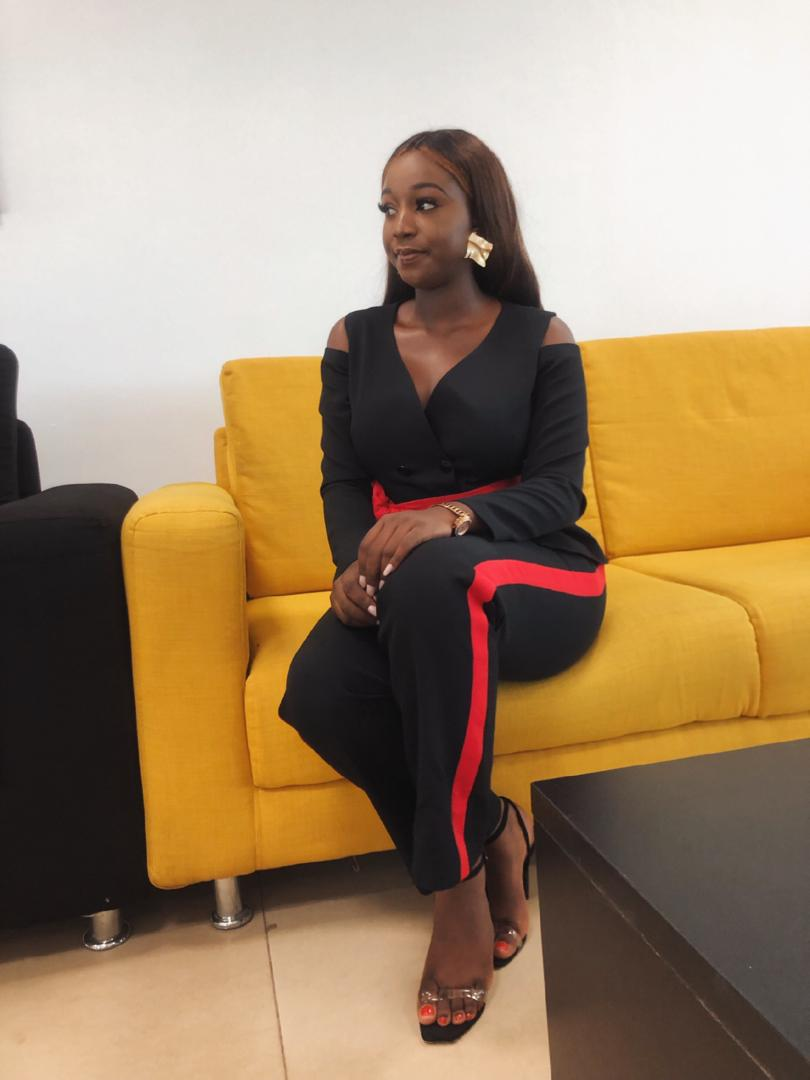
- Chidera Okolie in 2019 at the Idios Conference in Abuja
- Born: 27 March 1993 (age 33); Enugu, Enugu, Nigeria
- Occupations: Novelist, Lawyer, Freelancer
- Years active: 2014–present
- Notable work: When Silence Becomes Too Loud
- Awards: Fiction Writer of the year

Chidera Nneoma Okolie (born 27 March 1993) is a Nigerian writer who gained national attention with her debut novel When Silence Becomes Too Loud released in 2014.

== Biography ==
Okolie was born in Enugu in Southeast Nigeria.

As a young child, Okolie began showing signs of her love for literature, as she did considerably well in her literature courses in school and also began writing short stories for her classmates, while in high school.

Okolie went on to study Law at the University of Nigeria and was admitted to the Nigerian bar in November 2016.

== Literary career ==
Okolie published her first novel, When Silence Becomes Too Loud, in December 2014 while a law student. In March 2015 the novel was endorsed by then President of Nigeria, Goodluck Jonathan, in an entrepreneurship initiative in Abuja.

In September 2017, she released of her second publication, Not Forgiven, a collection of short psychological thriller stories.

=== Idios Creatives ===
In February 2018, Okolie founded Idios Creatives, a platform for young aspiring writers and creatives to express their creativity. In April 2018, she initiated the Idios Prize for Flash Fiction and Poetry, which attracted participation from at least 397 school children. One hundred stories were selected by Okolie and compiled into a book titled The Future: A Collection of Short Stories and Poems by Children of Selected Nigerian Schools, which was released in November 2018.

== Honours ==
In June 2015, Okolie was nominated for the African Achievers Awards. In 2016, she was named Fiction Writer of the Year and one of the 100 most influential Nigerian writers under 40 at the first Nigerian Writers Awards. She was also named Fiction Writer of the Year at the Xperience Womanity Awards.

In 2017, Okolie received the award for the Most Outstanding Fiction Writer of the Year by Alpha Gamma Multimedia Limited.

In January 2019, she was listed among the 100 Most Influential Young Nigerians by AvanceMedia in the category Law & Governance.
