= Nduka Onwuegbute =

Nigerian British playwright and author (born 1969)

Nduka Onwuegbute (born May 22, 1969) is a Nigerian British playwright and author.

== Biography ==
He is the fifth of sixteen children and was born in Manchester though he grew up Nigeria. He was educated at the University of Ibadan and the University of Jos, both in Nigeria. While in Nigeria, he wrote for the soap opera Riddles & Hopes. His work includes plays, short stories, and an educational book for children. He currently lives in the United Kingdom.

== Bibliography ==
=== Television ===
- Riddles & Hopes (Nigerian Television Authority)

=== Plays ===
- Family Circle
- Dancing the Fool
- Drums that Dance in the Dark (2007)

=== Prose ===
- Masters of the Confluence (2010)
- Fortune of the Forgotten Forest (2010)
- Abaci's Number Add-Ventures (2011)
