= Bukola Oriola =

Nigerian-American activist and journalist (born 1976)

- Born: 1976 (age 49–50); Nigeria
- Occupations: Activist, hair-braider, journalist
- Years active: 1999–present
- Organization: Imprisoned Show
- Notable work: Imprisoned: The Travails of a Trafficked Victim
- Children: Samuel Jacobs

Bukola Oriola (born 1976) is a Nigerian-American journalist. She lives in Anoka County, Minnesota, and has a son named Samuel Jacobs. She spent six years as a journalist covering education in Nigeria while still living in that country. In 2005, she came to the United States from Nigeria on a two-month work permit in order to cover a New York City meeting of the United Nations General Assembly. She married a US citizen who prevented her from establishing interpersonal relationships with anyone other than himself. He subjugated her to a life of unfree labour, confiscating all of her earnings. She was imprisoned in her home in this manner for two years. Bukola is a speaker, author, mentor, advocate, and entrepreneur.

== Publicity ==
She wrote and self-published a book Imprisoned: The Travails of a Trafficked Victim about her experiences of human trafficking. In August 2013, she appeared on a discussion panel following a screening of the documentary film Not My Life at the Humphrey School of Public Affairs' Cowles Auditorium. On December 16, 2015, she was appointed by President Barack Obama as a member of the United States Advisory Council on Human Trafficking, and was re-appointed to the same position by President Donald Trump in April, 2018. Bukola won the Cadbury National Award for Education Reporters in 2005. She started a non-profit organization known as "The Enitan Story" in August 2013 to advocate for victims and empower survivors of human trafficking.

Oriola is a fellow of the International Institute for Journalism, Germany.
