= Karen King-Aribisala =

Nigerian writer

- Born: Lagos, Nigeria
- Citizenship: Nigerian, British
- Occupations: Writer, Academic
- Writing career
- Language: English
- Genres: Fiction, Historical fiction
- Notable works: Kicking Tongues; Our Wife and Other Stories; The Hangman's Game
- Notable awards: Commonwealth Writers' Prize (Africa Region, Best First Book)

Karen Ann King-Aribisala (born Guyana) is a Nigerian novelist, and short story writer. She is a professor of English at the University of Lagos.

== Education ==
She was educated at the International School Ibadan, St. George's British International School, Italy (where she met her husband; Femi Aribisala), and the London Academy of Dramatic Arts.

== Works ==
- Our Wife and Other Stories, Malthouse Press, 1990, ISBN 978-978-2601-59-9; Ottawa, Canada: Laurier Books, 2004, ISBN 978-1-55394-010-4
- Kicking Tongues, Heinemann, 1998, ISBN 978-0-435-91200-0
- The Hangman's Game, Peepal Tree, 2007, ISBN 978-1-84523-046-3
- Bitter Leafing Woman and Other Stories, Malthouse Press, 2017.

== Prizes and awards ==
Her collection of stories, Our Wife and Other Stories won the 1991 Commonwealth Writers' Prize, Best First Book Africa, and her novel The Hangman's Game won 2008 Best Book Africa.

She also won grants from the Ford Foundation, British Council, Goethe Institute, and the James Michener Foundation.

== Anthologies ==
- Toyin Adewale-Nduka; Omowunmi Segun, eds. (1996). Breaking the Silence: an anthology of short stories. WRITA, Women Writers of Nigeria. ISBN 978-978-32456-6-2.
- "Wine in a Teacup". Kunapipi. 17 (3). Dangaroo Press: 83–85. 1995.

== Reviews ==
- Frank Birbalsingh, "Karen King-Aribisala: The Hangman’s Game", Guyana Journal, November 2008.
- "A review of Karen King-Aribisala's The Hangman's Game", The Signifyin' Woman, 19 April 2008.
