= Adaora Lily Ulasi =

Nigerian writer (1932–2016)

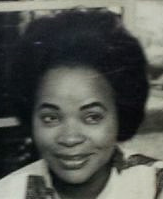
- Born: 1932; Aba, Eastern Nigeria
- Died: 21 February 2016 (aged 83-84)
- Occupations: Journalist and novelist
- Notable work: Many Thing You No Understand (1970); Many Thing Begin For Change (1971)
- Spouse: Deryk James (div. 1972)
- Children: 3

Adaora Lily Ulasi // (1932 – 21 February 2016) was a Nigerian journalist and novelist. She is said to have been the first West African woman to earn a degree in journalism. As a journalist, she has worked for the BBC and Voice of America. As a novelist she wrote detective fiction in English, "adapting the genre of the crime thriller to an Igbo or Yoruba context".

== Biography ==
Born in Aba, Eastern Nigeria, daughter of an Igbo Chief, she attended the local missionary school, but at the age of 15 was sent to the U.S. to study. After graduating from high school she then studied at Pepperdine University and at the University of Southern California, earning a BA in journalism in 1954. She supplemented her income by writing the occasional newspaper column, working as a nanny, and as a film extra appearing, for example, in the 1953 film White Witch Doctor that starred Susan Hayward and Robert Mitchum.

In the 1960s she was women's page editor of the Daily Times of Nigeria. She subsequently married Deryk James and had three children Heather, Angela and Martin. After her divorce in 1972 she went to Nigeria as editor of Woman's World magazine, and in 1976 returned to England.

Her first novel, Many Thing You No Understand (1970), "controversially (for the first time) used pidgin English to dramatise the interaction between colonial officers and local people in the pre-independence era, as did her subsequent works, Many Thing Begin For Change (1971), Who Is Jonah? (1978) and The Man from Sagamu (1978). By contrast, The Night Harry Died (1974) is set in southern USA." Ulasi worked at the Times Complex in Lagos, Nigeria. Ulasi died on 21 February 2016.

== Bibliography ==
- Many Thing You No Understand – London: Michael Joseph, 1970; Fontana, 1973
- Many Thing Begin For Change – London: Michael Joseph, 1971; Fontana, 1975
- The Night Harry Died – Lagos: Research Institute Nigeria, 1974
- Who Is Jonah? – Ibadan: Onibonoje Press, 1978
- The Man From Sagamu – London: Collins/Fontana, 1978; New York: Collier Macmillan, 1978

== See also ==
- List of Nigerian women writers
