= Bibliography of Black theology =

This is a bibliography of works on Black theology.

== Music ==
- Cone, James H. The Spirituals and the Blues, Mary Knoll, NY: Orbis Books, 1991.
- Mapson, J. Wendell, Jr., The Ministry of Music in the Black Church, Valley Forge: Judson Press, 1984
- Walker, Wyatt Tee. Somebody's Calling My Name: Black Sacred Music and Social Change, Valley Forge: Judson Press, 1979.

== Practical ministry ==
- Aldred, Joe. Praying with Power, London: Continuum, 2000 ISBN 978-0-8264-4984-9
- Aldred, Joe. Preaching With Power, London: Cassells, 1998
- Andersson, Efraim Churches at the Grassroots London: Lutterworth Press, 1968
- Andrews, Dale P. Practical Theology for Black Churches, Louisville: John Knox Press, 2002
- Cosby, Kevin W. Get Off Your But! Messages Musings and Ministries to Empower the African American Church, Lithonia, Georgia: Orman Press, 2000.
- Crawford, Evans E. The Hum: Call and Response in African American Preaching. Nashville: Abingdon, 1995.
- Felder, Cain Hope. The African Heritage Study Bible, Nashville, Tenn. The James C. Winston Publishing Company, 1993
- Kellar, Marcel. Timothy, Stir Up Your Gift!, Nashville: MEGA Corporation, 2000.
- Mitchell, Henry H. and Thomas, Emil M. Preaching for Black Self-Esteem, Nashville: Abingdon, 1994.
- Ratliffe, Joe S. & Michael J. Cox, Church Planting in the African American Community, Valley Forge: Judson Press, 2002. 111 pages.
- Reddie, Anthony. Acting in Solidarity Peterborough: DLT, 2005
- Reddie, Anthony. Nobodies to Somebodies: Practical Theology for Education and Liberation, Peterborough: Epworth Press, 2003
- Stewart III, Carlyle Fielding African American Church Growth Twelve Principles for Prophetic Ministry, Nashville, Abingdon Press, 1994
- Stewart III, Carlyle Fielding, ed. Growing the African American Church, Nashville, Abingdon Press, 2006
- Stewart III, Carlyle Fielding. "Joy Songs, Trumpet Blasts...Sermons in the African American Preaching Tradition, Lima Ohio, CSS Publishing, 1997
- Dudley, Granae D. and Stewart III, Carlyle Fielding. "Sankofa Celebrations for the African American Church, Cleveland, Ohio, United Church Press,1997
- Taylor, Edward L. comp. The Words of Gardner Taylor, Volume 1: NBC Radio Sermons (1959–1970). Valley Forge: Judson Press, 1999.
- Thomas, Walter S., Spiritual Navigation for the 21st Century: Sermons from Walter Thomas. Valley Forge: Judson Press, 2000.
- Trimiew, Darryl M., Editor. Out of Mighty Waters: Sermons by African American Disciples, St. Louis: Chalice Press, 1994.
- Waters, Kenneth L. Afrocentric Sermons: The Beauty of Blackness in the Bible, Valley Forge: Judson Press, 1993.
- Wimberly, Edward P. Moving From Shame to Self-Worth: Preaching and Pastoral Care, Nashville: Abingdon Press, 1999.
- Wright, Jeremiah A. Africans Who Shaped Our Faith: A Study of Ten Biblical Personalities, Chicago: Urban Ministries, 1995
- Wright, Jr., Jeremiah A. Good News: Sermons of Hope for Today's Families, Valley Forge: Judson, 1995.
- Wright, Jr., Jeremiah A. What Makes You So Strong?: Sermons of Joy and Strength from Jeremiah A. Wright, Jr., Valley Forge: Judson Press, 1993.

== Sexuality ==
- Douglas, Kelly Brown. Sexuality and the Black Church: A Womanist Perspective, Mary Knoll, NY: Orbis Books.
- Kornegay, Jr., EL. Queering Black Homophobia: Black Theology as a Sexual Discourse of Transformation, London: Continuum.
- Kornegay, Jr., EL. A Queering of Black Theology: James Baldwin's Blues Project and Gospel Prose, New York: Palgrave Press, 2013.

== Social issues ==
- Billingsley, Andrew. Mighty Like a River: The Black Church and Social Reform, New York: Oxford University Press, 1999.
- Fluker, Walter Earl, The Stones that the Builders Rejected: The Development of Ethical Leadership from the Black Church Tradition, Harrisburg: Trinity Press International, 1998.
- Franklin, Robert M. Another Day's Journey: Black Churches Confronting the American Crisis, Minneapolis: Fortress Press, 1997.
- Grant, Paul and Patel, Raj (Eds.) A Time to Speak. Birmingham: A joint publication of 'Racial Justice' and the 'Black Theology Working Group' 1990
- Grant, Paul and Patel, Raj (Eds.) A Time To Act: Kairos 1992 Birmingham: A joint publication of 'Racial Justice' and the 'Black Theology Working Group' 1992
- Harris, Forrest E. Ministry for Social Crisis: Theology and Praxis in the Black Church Tradition, Macon, Georgia: Mercer University Press, 1993
- January, Jerald. A Second Time: Examining the Sin of Racial Division that Remain in the Church Today, Grand Rapids: Zondervan, 1996.
- Kirylo, James D. Paulo Freire: The Man from Recife. New York: Peter Lang, 2011.
- Malone, Walter, Jr. An Operative Faith for Oppressed People, Nashville: National Baptist Publishing Board, 1988.
- Sawyer, Mary R. Black Ecumenism: Implementing the Demands of Justice, Philadelphia: Trinity Press International, 1998.

== Sociological and historical studies ==
- Andersson, Efraim. Churches at the Grassroots, London: Lutterworth Press, 1968
- Arnold, Bruce Makoto. "Shepherding a Flock of a Different Fleece: A Historical and Social Analysis of the Unique Attributes of the African American Pastoral Caregiver." The Journal of Pastoral Care and Counseling 66, no. 2 (June 2012).
- Cone, James H. and Wilmore, Gayraud S. Black Theology A Documentary History: Vol 1. 1966-1979, New York: Orbis Books, 1992
- Cone, James H. and Wilmore, Gayraud S. Black Theology A Documentary History: Vol 2. 1980- 1992, New York: Orbis Books, 1993
- Ela, Jean-Marc. African Cry, Maryknoll: Orbis Books, 1986
- Frazier, E. Franklin. The Black Church in America, New York: Shocken Books, 1964
- Jagessar, Michael N. and Anthony G. Reddie (eds.) Postcolonial Black British Theology, Peterborough, Epworth: 2007
- Jagessar, Michael N. and Anthony G. Reddie (eds.) Black Theology in Britain: A Reader, London, Equinox: 2007
- Lincoln, C. Eric, The Black Church in the African American Experience, Durham, N.Y.: Duke University Press, 1990
- Paris, Peter J. The Social Teaching of the Black Churches, Philadelphia: Fortress Press, 1985.
- Paris, Peter J. The Spirituality of African Peoples, Minneapolis: Fortress Press, 1995
- Pinn, Anne and Anthony B. Black Church History, Fortress Press, 2002
- Rabateau, Albert. Slave Religion, Oxford University Press, 1978
- Reddie, Richard S., Abolition! The Struggle to Abolish Slavery in the British Colonies, Lion Hudson PLC: Oxford, 2007.
- Reddie, Anthony. Faith, Stories and the Experience of Black Elders, London: Jessica Kingsley, 2001
- Sernett, Milton C. African American Religious History: A Documentary Witness, Duke University Press (2nd ed), 1999, ISBN 0-8223-2449-0
- Stewart III, Carlyle Fielding. Soul Survivors An African American Spirituality, Louisville, Ky, Westminster John Knox Press, 1997
- Stewart III, Carlyle Fielding. Black Spirituality and Black Consciousness, Trenton, New Jersey, Africa World Press, 1999
- Terrell, JoAnne Marie. Power in the Blood: The Cross in the African American Experience, New York: Orbis books, 1998
- Wilkinson, John. Church in Black and White, St. Andrews Press, 1994
- Williams, Ethel L. and Clifton F. Brown, Howard University Bibliography of African and Afro American Religious Studies: With Locations in American Libraries, SR Books, 1977, ISBN 0-8420-2080-2
- Wilmore, Gayraud. Black Religion and Black Radicalism, New York: Orbis Books, 1973.
- Wilmore, Gayraud and Cone, James H. (Eds.) "Black Theology: A Documentary History, 1966-1979", Maryknoll, New York: Orbis Books, 1979. pp. 350–359

== Theology and philosophy ==
- Anyabwile, Thabiti M. and Mark A. Noll. The Decline of African American Theology: From Biblical Faith to Cultural Captivity, Inter-Varsity Press, 2007.
- Bailey, Randall C. and Jacquelyn Grant, editors. The Recovery of Black Presence: An Interdisciplinary Exploration, Nashville: Abingdon Press, 1995.
- Bond, Gilbert I. Community, Communitas, and Cosmos: Toward a Phenomenological Interpretation and Theology of Traditional Afro-Christian Worship, New York: University Press of America, 2002
- Bond, Gilbert I., A Phenomenology of Reconciliation: Diasporic Community, Cerole Consciousness, and the Religious Life of Paul, Louisville: Westminster John Knox Press, 2000.
- Bridges, Flora Wilson. Resurrection Song: African-American Spirituality (The Bishop Henry McNeal Turner/Sojourner Truth Series in Black Religion, Mary Knoll: Orbis Books, 2000.
- Cone, James H. God of the Oppressed, New York: Seabury Press, 1975
- Cone, James H. For My People: Black Theology and the Black Church, New York: Orbis Books, 1984
- Cone, James H. My Soul Looks Back, New York: Orbis Books, 1986
- Cone, James H. Black Theology and Black Power (20th Anniversary Edition), New York: Harper San Francisco, 1989
- Cooper-Lewter, Nicholas. Soul Theology: The Heart of American Black Culture, Nashville: Abingdon.
- Douglas, Kelly Brown. The Black Christ (Bishop Henry McNeal Turner/Sojourner Truth Series in Black Religion), New York: Orbis Books, 1994
- Dube, Musa W. And Staley, Jeffrey L. John and Postcolonialism London: Sheffield Academic Press, 2002
- DuBois, W. E. B. The Souls of Black Folk New York: Dover Publications 1994
- Duffield, Ian K. (ed) Urban Christ: Responses to John Vincent, Sheffield: UTU, 1997
- Evans, Jr., James H. We Have Been Believers: An African American Systematic Theology, Minneapolis: Fortress Press, 1992
- Felder, Cain Hope Stony. The Road We Trod: African American Biblical Interpretation, Minneapolis: Fortress Press, 1991
- Gerloff, Roswith I. H. A Plea for British Black Theologies, Frankfurt am Main: Peter Lang, 1992
- Hood, Robert E. Must God Remain Greek?: Afro-Cultures and God-Talk, Minneapolis: Fortress Press, 1990
- Hood, Robert E. Begrimmed and Black: Christian Traditions on Blacks and Blackness, Minneapolis: Fortress Press, 1994
- Hope, Marjorie and Young, James. The South African Churches in a Revolutionary Situation, Maryknoll: Orbis Books, 1979
- Hopkins, Dwight N. (Ed.) Black Faith and Public Talk: Critical Essays on James H. Cone’s Black Theology and Black Power, New York: Orbis Books, 1999
- Hopkins, Dwight N. Introducing Black Theology of Liberation, New York: Orbis book, 1999
- Hopkins, Dwight N. Down, Up and Over: Slave Religion and Black Theology, Minneapolis: Fortress Press, 2000
- Hopkins, Dwight N. and Cummings, George. Cut Loose Your Stammering Tongue: Black Theology and the Slave Narratives, New York: Orbis Books, 1991
- Jennings, Theodore W. Good News to the Poor, Nashville: Abingdon Press, 1990
- Jones, William R. Is God a White Racist? Boston: Beacon Press, 1998.
- Kalilombe, Patrick A. Doing Theology at the Grassroots, Gweru, Zimbabwe: Mambo Press, 1999.
- Okholm, Dennis L. The Gospel in Black & White: Theological Resources for Racial Reconciliation, InterVarsity Press, 1997.
- Pinn, Anthony B. Why Lord?: Suffering and Evil in Black Theology, New York: Continuum, 1995
- Pinn, Anthony B. Terror and Triumph: The Nature of Black Religion, Minneapolis: Fortress Press, 2003
- Reddie, Anthony. Black Theology in Transatlantic Dialogue, Basingstoke & New York: Palgrave Macmillan, 2006.
- Reddie, Anthony. Dramatizing Theologies, London: Equinox, 2006.
- Reddie, Anthony. Working Against The Grain: Re-imaging Black Theology in the 21st Century, London: Equinox, 2008.
- Reddie, Anthony. Is God Colour Blind?: Insights from Black Theology for Christian Ministry, London: SPCK, 2009
- Reddie, Anthony. Black Theology, Slavery and Contemporary Christianity, Basingstoke: Ashgate, 2010
- Reddie, Anthony. SCM Core Text: Black Theology, London: SCM press, 2012
- Roberts, J. Deotis. Africentric Christianity: A Theological Appraisal for Ministry, Judson Press, 2000.
- Roberts, J. Deotis. Black Religion, Black Theology, Continuum International, 2003.
- Roberts, J. Deotis. Black Theology in Dialogue, Louisville: Westminster John Knox, 1987.
- Roberts, J. Deotis. Liberation and Reconciliation: A Black Theology (Second Edition), Louisville: Westminster John Knox, 2005.
- Roberts, J. Deotis. The Prophethood of Black Believers: An African-American Political Theology for Ministry, Westminster, John Knox, 1994.
- Roberts, Samuel K. In the Path of Virtue: The African American Moral Tradition, Cleveland: Pilgrim Press, 1999.
- Roberts, Samuel K. African American Christian Ethics, Cleveland: The Pilgrim Press, 2001.
- Sanders, Cheryl J. Empowerment Ethics for a Liberated People, Minneapolis: Augsburg Fortress, 1995.
- Simpson, Drumondo L., The New Blood of Black Liberation Theology, 2010
- Singleton III, Harry H. Black Theology and Ideology, Collgeville, Minnesota: The Liturgical Press, 2002.
- Society for Biblical Literature, Reading The Bible in The Global Village, Cape Town, No.3, Atlanta: Society for Biblical Literature, 2002
- Stewart III, Carlyle Fielding. "God Being and Liberation: A Comparative Analysis of the Theological Ontology and Ethical Methods of James H.Cone and Howard Thurman." Landham, New York, London, University Press of America, 1989
- West, Cornel. African American Religious Thought: An Anthology, Louisville: Westminster John Knox, 2004.

== Women in ministry ==
- Aldred, Joe. Sisters with Power, London: Continuum, 2000
- Collier-Thomas, Bettye. Daughters of Thunder: Black Women Preachers and Their Sermons 1850-1979, San Francisco: Jossey-Bass Publishers, 1998.
- Lightner, Ann Farrar. And Your Daughters Shall Preach: Developing a Female Mentoring Program in the African American Church, St. Louis: Hodale Press, Inc., 1995.
- Reddie, Anthony. Legacy: Anthology in Memory of Jillian Brown Peterborough: Methodist Publishing House, 2000

== Journals ==
- Black Theology: An International Journal, published three times per year.

== See also ==
- Black Consciousness Movement
- James H. Cone
- W. E. B. Du Bois
- Kairos Document
- Liberation theology
- Desmond Tutu
