= Cross of St Augustine =

Anglican ecclesiastical decoration

The Cross of St Augustine is an award of merit in the gift of the Archbishop of Canterbury. It is awarded to members of the Anglican Communion who have made significant contributions to the life of the worldwide Communion, or to a particular autonomous church within Anglicanism. It is also awarded to members of other traditions who have made a conspicuous contribution to ecumenism. It is the second highest international award for service within Anglicanism, after the Archbishop of Canterbury's Award for Outstanding Service to the Anglican Communion.

== History ==
The Award was created in 1965 by Archbishop Michael Ramsey. There is no limit on the number of recipients, although the Cross is said to be awarded to "a small number of clergy and lay people each year". 2008 is an example of a year in which the number of awards was larger, with 13 Crosses awarded at a standard presentation ceremony and 8 more awarded at a special presentation for key organisers of the 2008 Lambeth Conference.

== Grades of award ==
There are three grades of the Cross of St Augustine – bronze, silver, and gold. In almost all cases, unless stated otherwise, the silver award is made. A small number of bronze awards have been made for conspicuous service to Anglicanism; a very small number of gold awards have been made for outstanding service.

== Medal ==
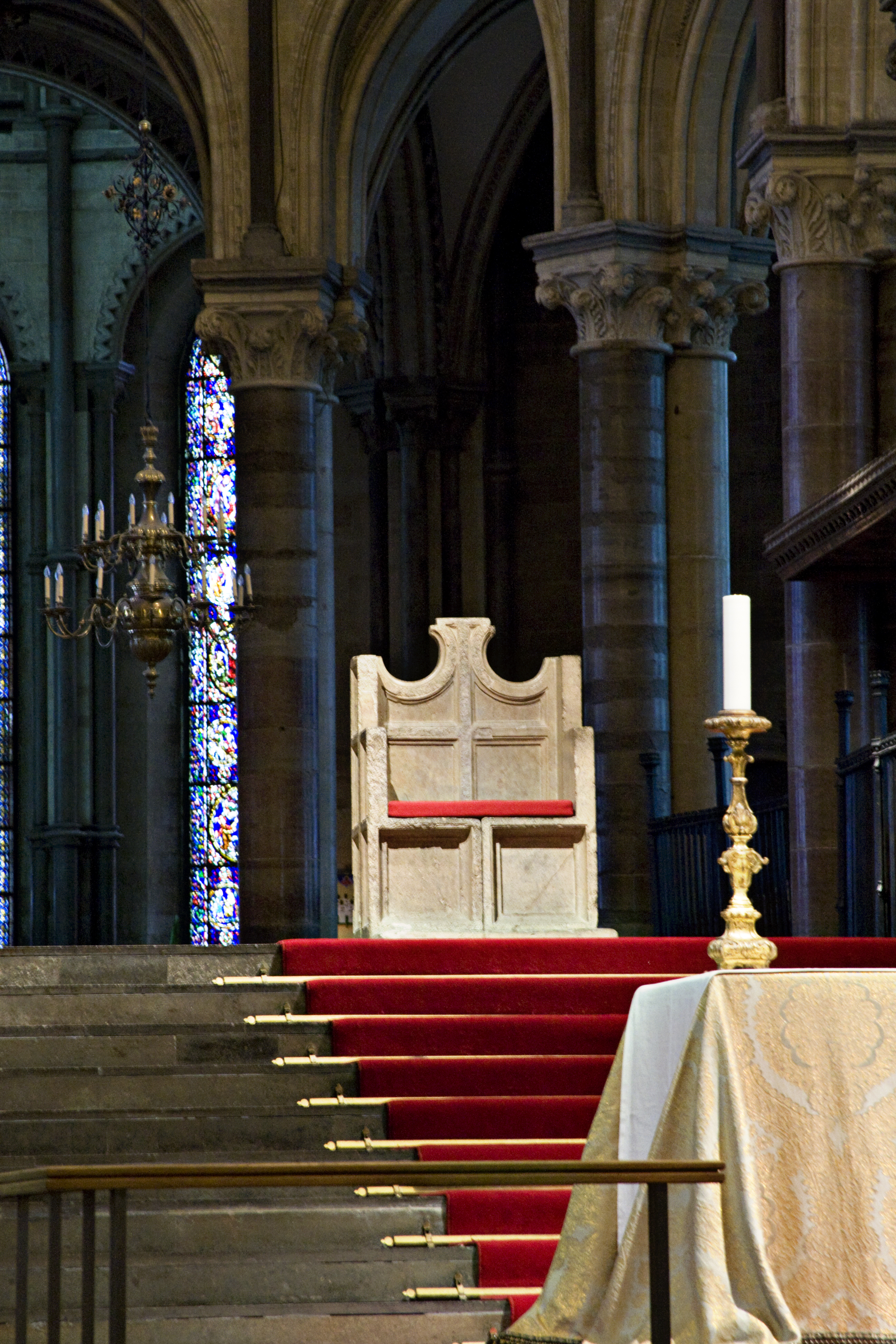
The Chair of St Augustine (the archiepiscopal throne in Canterbury Cathedral, Kent)

The medal awarded to recipients bears an engraving of the Chair of St Augustine on its reverse. This stone chair in Canterbury Cathedral is the seat of the Archbishop of Canterbury in his role as head of the Anglican Communion. Archbishops of Canterbury are enthroned twice: firstly as diocesan ordinary (and Metropolitan and Primate of the Church of England) in the archbishop's throne, by the Archdeacon of Canterbury; and secondly as leader of the worldwide church in the Chair of St Augustine by the Dean of Canterbury Cathedral which is followed by a blessing by the senior (by length of service) archbishop of the Anglican Communion. The stone chair is, therefore, of symbolic significance throughout Anglicanism. The obverse of the medal shows the Canterbury Cross. Medals are worn on a blue ribbon either around the neck (by clergy) as a collarette, or on the left breast (by laity).

== Precedence ==
The Cross of St Augustine is the second highest award within Anglicanism. The highest award granted by Lambeth Palace is the Archbishop of Canterbury's Award for Outstanding Service to the Anglican Communion, which is awarded exceedingly rarely, and is the highest award within the Anglican Communion.

These Lambeth Awards were expanded in March 2016 by Archbishop Justin Welby, by the addition of the six new awards based upon his ministry priority areas. The full suite of non-academic awards now complements the academic awards available through the Lambeth degrees.

== List of recipients ==
1981

- The Revd Dr Eugene Rathbone Fairweather
- Herbert J. Ryan SJ
- Edward Yarnold SJ
- Göran Bundy

1993

- Sir Michael Colman, 3rd Baronet

1994

- Frank Colquhoun

2001

24 September 2001

- Judith Gillespie, former executive for world missions at the Episcopal Church Center and grants officer at Trinity Church Wall Street, for "contribution to the global outreach of the Episcopal Church and the Anglican Communion"

2004

On 8 November 2004, Archbishop Rowan Williams awarded the following with the Cross:

- The Rt Revd Kenneth Barham
- Linda Borthwick
- The Revd Canon Bruce Duncan
- Gerre Hancock
- Virginia Johnstone
- Robert Kidd
- Professor Ann Lambton
- The Rt Revd Alan Morgan
- Jenny Ottewell
- Captain Philip Slater
- The Reverend Canon Robert Warren

2005

The Cross of Augustine was to be awarded to 13 recipients in this year:

- Dr. Mary Catterall
- The Revd Preb John Gaskell
- The Revd Dr. Anthony Gelston
- The Revd Canon Bill Hall
- Professor Jacques Heyman
- Father Aidan Mayoss CR
- The Revd Barry Nichols
- Mr. David Power
- The Revd Nicolas Stacey
- The Revd Michael Stevens
- Mr. Gordon Thorne
- Mr. David Vermont
- Mr. David Williams

2006 Eight recipients:

- The Revd Gethin Abraham-Williams
- The Revd Donald Brewin
- Miss Margaret Doak
- Mr David and Mrs Hazel Gedge
- The Revd Dr. Paul Gibson
- Dr. Bernard Knowles
- Miss Catherine Widdicombe

2008 13 recipients:

- Mr Kenneth Beard
- The Rt Revd Michael Bourke
- The Revd Canon Dr William Broughton
- The Revd Canon Wilfrid Browning
- Miss Gillian Dare
- The Hon Jill Ganzoni
- The Revd Andrew Henderson
- Mr Vijay Menon
- The Most Revd Ellison Pogo KBE
- Mrs Judith Scott
- Mrs Sheila Tolson
- The Revd Canon Robert Whyte
- Mrs Maggi Whyte

Eight more recipients in the same year:

- The Revd Dr Ian T Douglas, Associate Professor of World Mission & Global Christianity, Episcopal Divinity School in Massachusetts, USA
- The Most Revd Ian Ernest, Archbishop of the Indian Ocean & Bishop of Mauritius, Province of the Indian Ocean
- The Rt Revd Colin Fletcher, OBE Bishop of Dorchester, Church of England
- The Rt Revd Winston Halapua, Suffragan Bishop for the Diocese of Polynesia in New Zealand
- The Most Revd Thabo Makgoba, Archbishop of Cape Town, Anglican Church of Southern Africa
- The Rt Revd Miguel Tamayo, Bishop of Uruguay, Province of the Southern Cone
- The Rt Revd James Tengatenga, Bishop of Southern Malawi, Province of Central Africa
- Ms Fung Yi Wong from the province of Hong Kong Sheng Kung Hui

2009

January. Two recipients:

- Deirdre Martin
- Canon James Rosenthal

Also, February:

- Monsignor Donald Bolen

March:

- The Rt Revd Gregory Cameron

2012

- The Reverend Canon Dr Gideon Byamugisha, "for his pioneering work helping African communities to overcome the suffering of HIV and AIDS"
- The Very Reverend Dr Robert Willis DL KStJ, Dean of Canterbury
- Mrs Anne Sloman OBE
- The Reverend Canon Dr Patrick Augustine "in recognition of his contribution at national and international level to the promotion of evangelism, ecumenism, and the free exercise of faith."

2016

- Prof. Salvatore Bordonali, "for his contribution to the legal and bureaucratic recognition of the Church of England by the Italian Republic and to the agreement of an 'Intesa' between the parties"
- The Reverend Canon Jamie Callaway, "for services to international Anglicanism"
- The Reverend Hamdy Sedky Daoud, "for sustained and courageous service to the Anglican Communion in North Africa"
- The Rt Revd Hilkiah Omindo Deya, "for his contribution to the mission of the Church of God in his own diocese, in his province of Tanzania and subsequently to the wider communion in promoting stability in Anglicanism in East Africa"
- Prof. Fabiano Di Prima, "for his contribution to the legal and bureaucratic recognition of the Church of England by the Italian Republic and to the agreement of an 'Intesa' between the parties"
- Phyllis Richardson, "for her outstanding contribution to the flourishing of local church community"

2017

- Dr Sally Thompson, "For her outstanding work in building and sustaining the International Anglican Family Network"

2018

- The Reverend Canon Joanna Udal
- Lynne Tembey, "for selflessly serving the Mothers' Union for nearly 40 years, particularly as worldwide president"

2021

- Archbishop Colin Johnson (bishop), "for extraordinary efforts and leadership in sustaining communion through initiating ongoing dialogue amongst Bishops across the Anglican Communion – especially Canada, Africa, the UK and the USA – following Lambeth 2008 through to 2020."
- The Reverend Canon Dr. Isaac Kawuki Mukasa, "for extraordinary efforts and leadership in sustaining communion through initiating ongoing dialogue amongst Bishops across the Anglican Communion – especially Canada, Africa, the UK and the USA – following Lambeth 2008 through to 2020."
- Bishop Luke Lungile Pato, "for outstanding lifelong service to the Church and society through theological education as well as in ecumenical relations."
- The Most Reverend Daniel Yinkah Sarfo, "for an outstanding and selfless contribution over 40 years to the life and witness of churches of the Anglican Communion, especially in West Africa and specifically Ghana."

2022

- Bishop Mark MacDonald, “for outstanding service to support the Communion’s role in creation care and climate justice, including the voice of Indigenous peoples.”
- Canon Delene Mark, "for outstanding service to support the Communion’s pandemic response, including through the Global Covid-19 Task Force."
- The Most Reverend Julio E. Murray Thompson, "for outstanding service to support the Communion’s role in creation care and climate justice."
- Nagulan Nesiah, "for outstanding service to support the Communion’s pandemic response, including through the Global Covid-19 Task Force."
- The Right Reverend Professor Stephen Pickard, "for his significant service to the Anglican Communion as a theologian, teacher and bishop, and in particular in his service of the Inter-Anglican Theological and Doctrinal Commission and the Inter-Anglican Standing Commission on Unity, Faith and Order."
- The Right Reverend Dr Philip Poole DD, "for outstanding leadership and support of the Compass Rose Society, Princess Basma Centre, Jerusalem, and St. George’s College, Jerusalem."
- Dr Sally Smith, "for outstanding service to support the Communion’s pandemic response, including through the Global Covid-19 Task Force."
- Paul Thaxter, "for his outstanding contribution to sustaining and strengthening the bonds of love and unity across the Anglican Communion."
- The Reverend Pauline Walker, "for almost 44 years of missionary endeavour in Sudan and South Sudan through which she stimulated the development and training of a new generation of Christian leaders, many of whom are bishops today."

Eleven more recipients in the same year:

- Phil George (Chief Executive Officer, Lambeth Conference, UK)
- The Rev. Dr. Robert S. Heaney (Professor of Theology, Virginia Theological Seminary, USA)
- The Rt. Rev. Dr. Emma Ineson (Bishop of Kennsington, UK)
- The Rt. Rev. Joel Waweru Mwangi Joel Waweru Mwangi (Bishop of Nairobi, Kenya)
- The Rev. Cathrine Fungai Ngangira (Diocese of Canterbury, UK)
- Matilda Ntahoturi (Burundi)
- The Rt. Rev. Pradeep Samantaroy (Moderator of the Church of North India, Bishop of Amritsar)
- The Rt. Rev. Nigel Stock (bishop) (Retired)
- The Rev. Dr. Jennifer Strawbridge (University of Oxford, UK)
- The Rt. Rev. Dr. George R. Sumner (Bishop of Dallas, USA)
- The Most Rev. Melter Tais (Bishop of Saba, Malaysia)

2023

- Otumfuo Nana Osei Tutu II

== See also ==
- St Augustine's Cross
- List of ecclesiastical decorations
- Lambeth Awards
