= Waweru =

Waweru is a Kenyan name given to baby boys of the Kikuyu tribe in the Mount Kenya region.

- Charles Waweru Kamathi (born 1978), Kenyan long-distance runner
- David Waweru, CEO of WordAlive Publishers
- George Japhet Waweru (born 1978), Kenyan footballer
- Joel Waweru Mwangi (born 1959), Kenyan bishop
- John Kiarie Waweru (born 1978), Kenyan politician
- Julius Waweru Karangi (born 1951), former General in the Kenya Defence Forces
- Patrick Waweru (born 1958), Kenyan boxer
- Peter Waweru (born 1982), Kenyan football referee
- Wangechi Waweru (born 1994), Kenyan musician
