= Black theology =

Theological perspective

Black theology, or black liberation theology, refers to a Christian theological perspective that originated among African-American churchmen and scholars, and has since spread to many black churches in the United States and other parts of the world. It contextualizes Christianity in an attempt to help those of African descent overcome oppression. It especially focuses on the injustices committed against African Americans during segregation and black South Africans during apartheid.

Black theology seeks to liberate non-white people from multiple forms of political, social, economic, and religious subjugation and views Christian theology as a theology of liberation: "a rational study of the being of God in the world in light of the existential situation of an oppressed community, relating the forces of liberation to the essence of the Gospel, which is Jesus Christ", writes James H. Cone, one of the original advocates of the perspective. Black theology mixes Christianity with questions of civil rights, particularly raised by the Black Power movement, Black supremacy, and the Black Consciousness Movement.

== History ==
Modern American origins of contemporary black theology can be traced to July 31, 1966, when an ad hoc group of 51 concerned clergy, calling themselves the National Committee of Negro Churchmen, bought a full page ad in The New York Times to publish their "Black Power Statement", which proposed a more aggressive approach to combating racism using the Bible for inspiration. Black theology arose as an affirmation of black Christians in response to critiques from a range of sources, including black Muslims, that claimed Christianity was a "white man's religion", white Christians that saw black churches as inferior, black Marxists that saw religion as an unscientific tool of the oppressor, and black power advocates who saw being Christian as incompatible with being black.

In American history, ideas of race and slavery were supported by many Christians from particular readings of the Bible. The Southern Baptist Convention supported slavery and slaveholders; it was not until June 20, 1995, that the formal Declaration of Repentance was adopted. This non-binding resolution declared that racism, in all its forms, is deplorable" and "lamented on a national scale and is also repudiated in history as an act of evil from which a continued bitter harvest unfortunately is reaped." The convention offered an apology for "condoning and/or perpetuating individual and systemic racism in our lifetime" and repentance for "racism of which many have been guilty, whether consciously or unconsciously. These historic events are used to associate Christianity with racism but the Bible stresses that race is irrelevant: "There is neither Jew nor Greek, there is neither slave nor free, there is no male and female, for you are all one in Christ Jesus" (Galatians 3:28). Cone relates that, once upon a time it was acceptable to lynch a black man by hanging him from the tree; but today's economics destroy him by crowding many into a ghetto and letting filth and despair put the final touch on a coveted death.

Black theology deals primarily with the African-American community to make Christianity real for black people. It explains Christianity as a matter of liberation here and now, rather than in an afterlife. The goal of black theology is not for special treatment. Instead, "All Black theologians are asking for is for freedom and justice. No more, and no less. In asking for this, the black theologians, turn to scripture as the sanction for their demand. The Psalmist writes for instance, "If God is going to see righteousness established in the land, he himself must be particularly active as "the helper of the fatherless" (Psalm 10:14) to "deliver the needy when he crieth; and the poor that hath no helper" (Psalm 72:12).

Black theology would eventually develop outside of the United States to the United Kingdom and parts of Africa, especially addressing apartheid in South Africa.

=== United States ===
James H. Cone first addressed this theology after Malcolm X's proclamation against Christianity being taught as "a white man's religion" in the 1950s. According to black religion expert Jonathan L. Walton:

James Cone believed that the New Testament revealed Jesus as one who identified with those suffering under oppression, the socially marginalized and the cultural outcasts. And since the socially constructed categories of race in America (i.e., whiteness and blackness) had come to culturally signify dominance (whiteness) and oppression (blackness), from a theological perspective, Cone argued that Jesus reveals himself as black in order to disrupt and dismantle white oppression.

Black theology contends that dominant cultures have corrupted Christianity, and the result is a mainstream faith-based empire that serves its own interests, not God's interests. Black theology asks whose side should God be on – the side of the oppressed or the side of the oppressors. If God values justice over victimization, then God desires that all oppressed people should be liberated. According to Cone, if God is not just, if God does not desire justice, then God needs to be done away with. Liberation from a false god who privileges whites, and the realization of an alternative and true God who desires the empowerment of the oppressed through self-definition, self-affirmation, and self-determination is the core of black theology.

Black theology largely foregoes intricate, philosophical views of God, instead, it focuses on God as "God in action", delivering the oppressed because of his righteousness. The central theme of African-American popular religion, as well as abolitionists like Harriet Tubman, was the Old Testament God of Moses freeing the ancient Hebrews from Egyptian rulers. Likewise, Cone based much of his liberationist theology on God's deliverance of Israel from Egypt in the Book of Exodus. He compared the United States to Egypt, predicting that oppressed people will soon be led to a promised land. For Cone, the theme of Yahweh's concern was for "the lack of social, economic, and political justice for those who are poor and unwanted in society." Cone argued that the same God is working for the deliverance of oppressed black Americans.

Cone agreed with the Christian doctrine of the Trinity, affirming that Jesus is "truly God and truly man". Cone argued that Jesus' role was to liberate the oppressed, using the Gospel of Luke to illustrate this point: "the blind receive their sight, the lame walk, the lepers are cleansed, the deaf hear, the dead are raised up, and the poor have the good news preached to them" (Luke 7:22). Cone also argued that, "We cannot solve ethical questions of the twentieth century by looking at what Jesus did in the first. Our choices are not the same as his. Being Christians does not mean following 'in his steps.'" Cone objected to the persistent portrayal of Jesus as white:

It's very important because you've got a lot of white images of Christ. In reality, Christ was not white, not European. That's important to the psychic and to the spiritual consciousness of Black people who live in a ghetto and in a white society in which their lord and savior looks just like people who victimize them. God is whatever color God needs to be in order to let people know they're not nobodies, they're somebodies.

=== South Africa ===
Black theology was popularized in southern Africa in the early 1970s by Basil Moore, a Methodist theologian in South Africa. It helped to give rise to, and developed in parallel with, the Black Consciousness Movement. Black theology was particularly influential in South Africa and Namibia for motivating resistance to apartheid. This movement would also be closely related to the South African Kairos Document. Southern African black theologians include Barney Pityana, Allan Boesak, and Itumeleng Mosala.

On the African continent, a distinction is often made between black theology, with its emphasis on liberation in southern Africa, and African theology, with its focus on drawing on African cultural ideas towards the inculturation of Christian theology.

=== Britain ===
In the United Kingdom, Robert Beckford is a prominent black theology practitioner. He was the first in the UK to develop and teach a course on black theology at an academic level.

Although it is not limited to the British context, an academic journal which has been a key outlet for the discourse around black theology in Britain has been Black Theology, edited by Anthony G. Reddie.

== Criticism ==
Anthony Bradley of conservative news site The Christian Post interprets that the language of "economic parity" and references to "mal-distribution" as nothing more than channeling the views of Karl Marx. He believes James H. Cone and Cornel West have worked to incorporate Marxist thought into the black church, forming an ethical framework predicated on a system of oppressor class versus a victim much like Marxism.

Trinity United Church of Christ, Chicago, has been cited in the press and by Cone as the best example of a church formally founded on the vision of black theology. The 2008 Jeremiah Wright controversy, over alleged racism and anti-Americanism in Wright's sermons and statements, caused then-Senator Barack Obama to distance himself from his former pastor.

Stanley Kurtz of the National Review wrote about the perceived differences with "conventional American Christianity". He quoted the black theologian Obery M. Hendricks Jr.: "According to Hendricks, 'many good church-going folk have been deluded into behaving like modern-day Pharisees and Sadducees when they think they're really being good Christians.' Unwittingly, Hendricks says, these apparent Christians have actually become 'like the false prophets of Ba'al.'" Kurtz also quotes Jeremiah Wright: "How do I tell my children about the African Jesus who is not the guy they see in the picture of the blond-haired, blue-eyed guy in their Bible or the figment of white supremacists [sic] imagination that they see in Mel Gibson's movies?"

== See also ==
- Bibliography of Black theology
- Albert Cleage
- W. E. B. Du Bois
- Marcus Garvey
- Dwight Hopkins
- Martin Luther King Jr.
- J. Deotis Roberts
- Christianity and politics
- Christian communism
- Christian Identity
- Christian left
- Christian nationalism
- Christian right
- Christian socialism
- Christian views on slavery
- Liberation theology
- Womanist theology
- African diaspora religions
- Religion of black Americans
- Religion in politics
- Religious nationalism
- Slavery and religion
