= David Waweru =

CEO of WordAlive Publishers

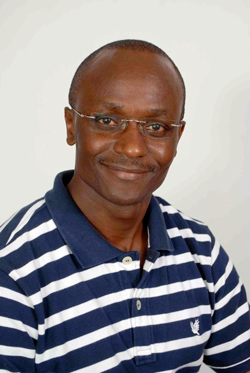
- Born: David Waweru; Kenya
- Occupation: CEO WordAlive Publishers
- Years active: 10
- Known for: Publishing
- Relatives: Waweru Macharia
- Website: http://www.davidwaweru.com

David Waweru is the CEO of WordAlive Publishers based out of Nairobi, Kenya. According to his website he refers to himself as a "publisher, trainer, coach, and speaker". WordAlive Publishers was founded in September 2001.

David Waweru has been active in advocating for a strong and vibrant local publishing industry and reading culture in East Africa. In interviews with Nation TV and Business Daily, David alludes that though the Kenyan book trade has faced major challenges in the last couple of years, the market will recover.

Museum of Learning indicates David Waweru saw a need in Trade and Christian publishing that few were willing risk investment in due to a perceived poor reading culture in most of sub-Saharan Africa. In an article titled, "A Literary Contribution to Healing" in the Daily Nation, David Waweru said "We cannot always complain about a poor reading culture," he said. "It is up to us to expand the horizons and give people what they want to read."

The Christian Marketplace quoted David as saying that "there is potential for indigenous writers and publishers" during the release of Eyo, by Nigerian writer Abidemi Sanusi. In an article "Publisher Keeps the Word Alive" by Business Daily, David talked about ingenuity in promoting Africa authors through events like author tours, book signings, launches and a consistent author branding programme. Events, dubbed BookTalkAfrica have already been held in Nairobi and Kampala where people queued waiting to speak to their favourite authors.
