= Eyo =

Eyo or EYO may refer to:

== People ==
- Alicya Eyo (born 1975), British actress
- Effiong Okon Eyo (1918–1983), Nigerian politician
- Eyo Esua (1901–1973), Nigerian teacher and trade unionist
- Eyo Ita (1903–1972), Nigerian politician

== Other uses ==
- Eyo (novel), by Abidemi Sanusi
- Eyo!, an album by the Belgian band K3
- Keiyo language, spoken in Kenya
- Eyo festival, in Lagos, Nigeria

== Cities ==
- Old Oyo, archaeological site in Nigeria, Oyo state
