= Joel Edwards =

Joel Edwards may refer to:

- Joel Edwards (rugby league), Australian professional rugby league player
- Joel Edwards (Evangelical Alliance), director of Evangelical Alliance
- Joel Edwards (golfer), an American professional golfer
- Joel Edwards (singer), English singer
