= Mark Hedley =

British judge (born 1946)

Sir Mark Hedley, DL (born 23 August 1946) is a British retired judge. He was a Justice of the High Court from 2002 to 2013.

== Early life and education ==
Hedley was born on 23 August 1946 in London, England. He was educated at Framlingham College, then an all-boys private school. He studied law at the University of Liverpool, graduating with a Bachelor of Laws (LLB) degree.

== Legal career ==
Hedley was called to the bar at Gray's Inn in 1969 and made a bencher in 2002. He was appointed a Recorder in 1988 and a circuit judge for the Northern Circuit in 1992. On 11 January 2002, he was appointed a High Court judge, receiving the customary knighthood, and assigned to the Family Division. He retired on 10 January 2013.

== Ecclesiastical career ==
Since 1975, Hedley has been a Reader (licensed lay minister) of the Church of England. In 2002, he was appointed Chancellor of the Anglican Diocese of Liverpool. In August 2024 a BBC investigation revealed that Hedley had made Decisions in his role as Deputy President of Tribunals which meant that complaints against a priest were not able to be examined fully under the Clergy Discipline Measure. Hedley wrote in his Decision: "I think it could be proved that the respondent had some non-consensual homosexual relations with the complainant." However, he declined to send the case to a tribunal because he did not think it was possible to prove that the alleged victim was under the age of 18.

== Honours ==
On 27 April 2015, Hedley was appointed a Deputy Lieutenant (DL) of Merseyside.

He was awarded the Canterbury Cross for Services to the Church of England in 2022.
