= Agnes Abuom =

Kenyan Christian organizational worker (1949–2023)

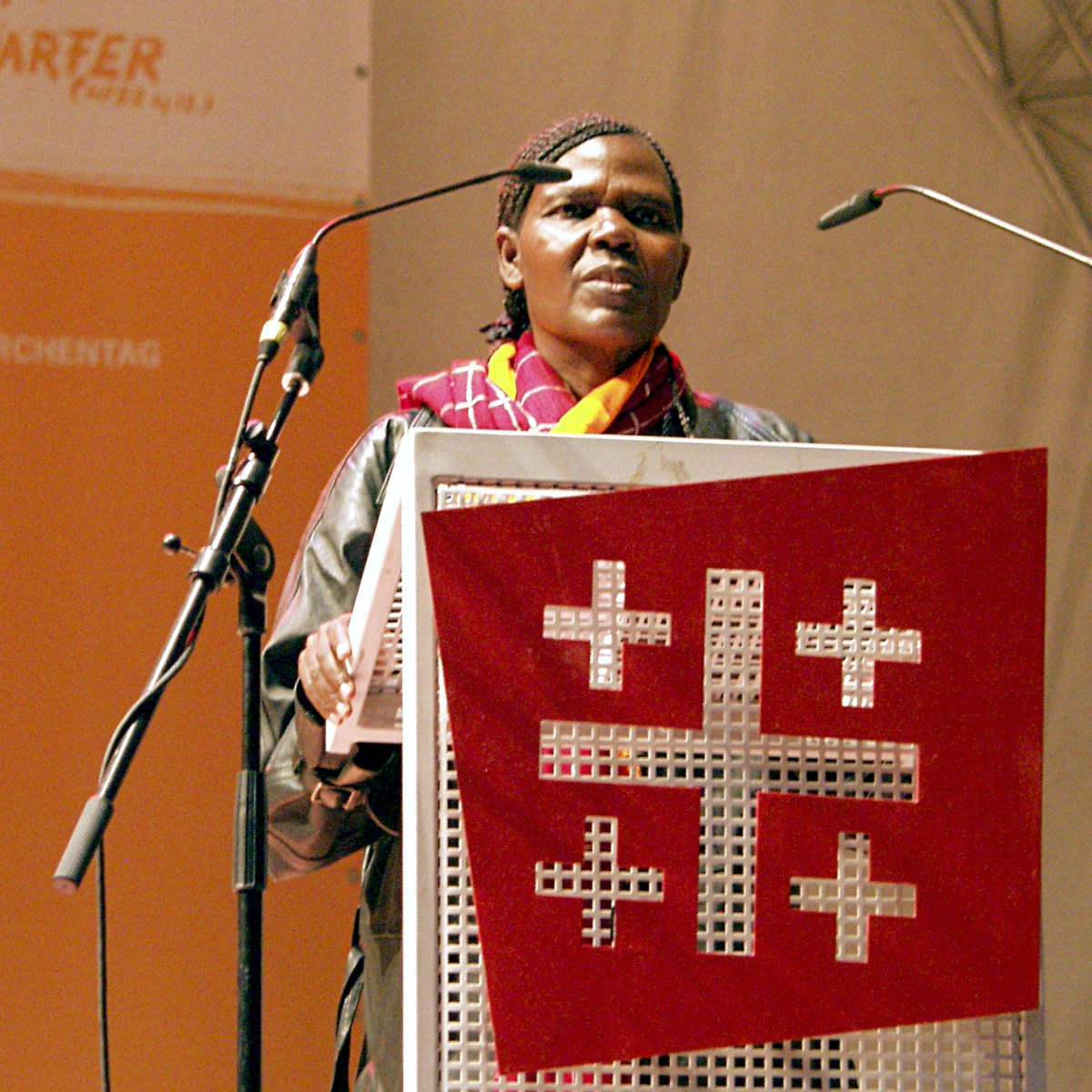
- Abuom in Cologne, 2009. Photo: Raimond Spekking
- Born: Agnes Regina Murei Abuom; 1949; Nandi Hills, British Kenya
- Died: 31 May 2023 (aged 73)
- Occupation: Moderator of the Central Committee of the World Council of Churches (WCC)
- Known for: Africa president for the WCC
- Spouse: Widow
- Children: 2

Agnes Regina Murei Abuom (1949 – 31 May 2023) was a Kenyan Christian organisational worker who served as moderator of the Central Committee of the World Council of Churches (WCC) since 2013. She was the first woman and the first African to hold this post. She represented the Anglican Church of Kenya.

== Early life ==
Aubom was born in Nandi Hills, into a family of six children and a mother who worked with community development. She was educated at mission schools, first in her local area, then later at a boarding school run by missionaries. She went to high school near Nairobi and then undertook studies at University of Nairobi.

== Career ==
Abuom became involved with the World Council of Churches when the WCC's assembly was held in Nairobi in 1975. She also was involved in student organizations and politics – the latter causing controversies that led her to leave Kenya for Sweden in 1976. She learned Swedish and earned a degree in education. After two years as a youth worker for WCC in Geneva, she returned to Sweden and earned a doctorate in missiology with the thesis "The Role of Non-Governmental Organizations in Development". She later worked with refugee issues for WCC in Sudan and worked two years in Zimbabwe as a tutor.

Returning to Kenya in 1989, Abuom was imprisoned for her opposition to President Daniel Arap Moi. She went on to work for the Anglican Church of Kenya, mostly with national development issues, and from 1991 with a civic education program.

Abuom became African president for the WCC in 1999 and served until 2006. She also worked with All Africa Conference of Churches, African Council of Religious Leaders (ACRL) / Religions for Peace, and National Council of Churches of Kenya. She was involved in ecumenical work and peace-building efforts in the Horn of Africa and other places.

Abuom was one of the Directors of TAABCO Research and Development Consultants, which was established in 1997 and focuses on consultant work for civil society organisations and aid organisations.

=== Moderator of WCC ===
In November 2013, Abuom was unanimously elected moderator of the WCC Central Committee at the organization's assembly in Busan, South Korea. She was the first woman and the first African to hold that position.

== Personal life and death ==
Abuom had two daughters; her husband died in July 2014.

Abuom died on 31 May 2023, at the age of 73.

== Honours ==
In 2017, she was awarded the Lambeth Cross for Ecumenism by the Archbishop of Canterbury "for her exceptional contribution to the Ecumenical Movement, for her work with the World Council of Churches and currently its Moderator". In 2019, Abuom received the National Council of Churches' s President’s Award for Excellence in Faithful Leadership. The award announcement stated that she was being recognized for "exceptional, risk-taking leadership." She also received an honorary doctorate from VID Specialized University in Norway.
