= WordAlive Publishers =

African publishing company

- Type: Publisher
- Industry: Publishing
- Founded: Nairobi, Kenya (2001)
- Headquarters: Nairobi, Kenya; Kampala, Uganda
- Key people: David Waweru
- Products: Personal Growth, Inspirational, Leadership, Relationships, Fiction, Theology and Children's Books
- Website: WordAlive Publishers

WordAlive Publishers publishes, markets, and distributes Christian books in Sub-Saharan Africa. WordAlive Publishers is a Pan-African publishing house based in Nairobi, Kenya, with offices in Kampala, Uganda. The company mainly focuses on personal growth, inspiration, leadership, relationships, fiction, theology, and children's books. WordAlive's catalogue contains more than 70 titles from both local and international authors. In 2009, Eyo, the first general fiction title in their catalogue, was published.

== History ==
WordAlive Publishers was founded in September 2001 by David Waweru, whose publishing career had begun at the University of Nairobi press ten years earlier. At the time, most publishing houses in Kenya focused on textbook publishing with a few others engaged in religious publishing, and none published general trade books as a core business. Many cited perceived poor reading habits in Kenya and poverty as reasons why they did not think that these areas were viable propositions. WordAlive now accounts for 35% of their sales from "upcountry" – outside Kenya's major towns – areas that are considered "poor" by Kenyan standards.

WordAlive is the African publisher of the Africa Bible Commentary, a 1,586-page one-volume commentary released in 2006 and written by 69 African scholars. The commentary aims to use African proverbs, metaphors and everyday stories to convey the text of the Bible to African believers while remaining true to the text and being honest about its context.

In 2008 WordAlive Publishers, together with Africa Christian Text Books, based in Jos, Nigeria, and Zondervan in the US, created an imprint called Hippo Books. "The imprint is comprised of a broad range of serious Christian and Theological publications written especially for Pastors, church leaders, and academics (Theological Students, Teachers, and Scholars). Titles in this imprint include Bible commentaries and new works in biblical studies, cultural studies, ethics, history, systematic theology, and more."

== Works published ==
Notable works and authors published by Word Alive Publishers include:

- Eyo, Abidemi Sanusi (2009) View Eyo
- Africa Bible Commentary, Tokunboh Adeyemo (2006) View Africa Bible Commentary
- Africa's Enigma and Leadership Solutions, Tokunboh Adeyemo (2009) View Africa Enigma and Leadership Solutions
- Best Foot Forward, Fred Geke (2007) view Best Foot Forward
- How to Save Money, Ken Monyoncho (2007) view How to Save Money
- Bishop Tucker, Christopher Byaruhanga (2008) view Bishop Tucker
- African Christian Ethics, Samuel Waje Kunhiyop (2008) view African Christian Ethics
- Is Africa Cursed, Tokunboh Adeyemo (2009) view Is Africa Cursed
