= Ken Barham =

British Anglican bishop

The Right Reverend Ken Barham OBE
- Bishop of Cyangugu
- Church: Anglican Church of Rwanda
- Diocese: Cyangugu
- In office: 1996–2001
- Other posts: Assistant Bishop of Cyangugu (1993–1996); Priest-in-charge of Ashburnham and Penhurst (1984–2001); Honorary assistant bishop, Diocese of Chichester (2005–present)

Orders
- Ordination: 1963 (deacon); 1964 (priest) by Roger Wilson
- Consecration: 1993

Personal details
- Born: 1936 (age 89–90)
- Denomination: Anglican
- Parents: Lawrence & Julia
- Spouse: Jill
- Education: Clifton Theological College

Kenneth Lawrence "Ken" Barham OBE (born 1936) is a retired Anglican bishop.

Barham was born in 1936, a son of Lawrence Barham (second Bishop of Rwanda and Burundi, 1964–1966) and Julia née Leakey. He married Jill, a teacher. Like his father, Barham became an Anglican priest and later bishop: he trained at Clifton Theological College, gaining his Bachelor of Divinity (BD) in 1963.

Ordained a deacon at Michaelmas (29 September) 1963 and a priest at Michaelmas (20 September) 1964 (both times by Roger Wilson, Bishop of Chichester in Chichester Cathedral), he served curacies in Worthing, Sevenoaks and Cheltenham. His first incumbency was as vicar of Maidstone, from 1970 until 1979, when he became the South Area Secretary for the CMS Rwanda mission, until 1984. He returned to parochial ministry as priest-in-charge of Ashburnham and Penhurst until 2001. During this time, however, he also held posts in the Province of the Anglican Church of Rwanda.

Among those colonial mission posts, Barham was consecrated in 1993 as Assistant Bishop of Cyangugu, becoming diocesan Bishop of Cyangugu in 1996 until his 2001 retirement. In 2001, he was made an Officer of the Order of the British Empire (OBE) and retired to Sussex; where he has served the Diocese of Chichester as an honorary assistant bishop since 2005.

In 2004 the then Archbishop of Canterbury, Rowan Williams, awarded Barham the Cross of St Augustine in recognition of his work for the Anglican Communion.
