= Christ Episcopal Church (La Crosse, Wisconsin) =

Historic church in Wisconsin, United States

- Christ Church of La Crosse
- U.S. National Register of Historic Places
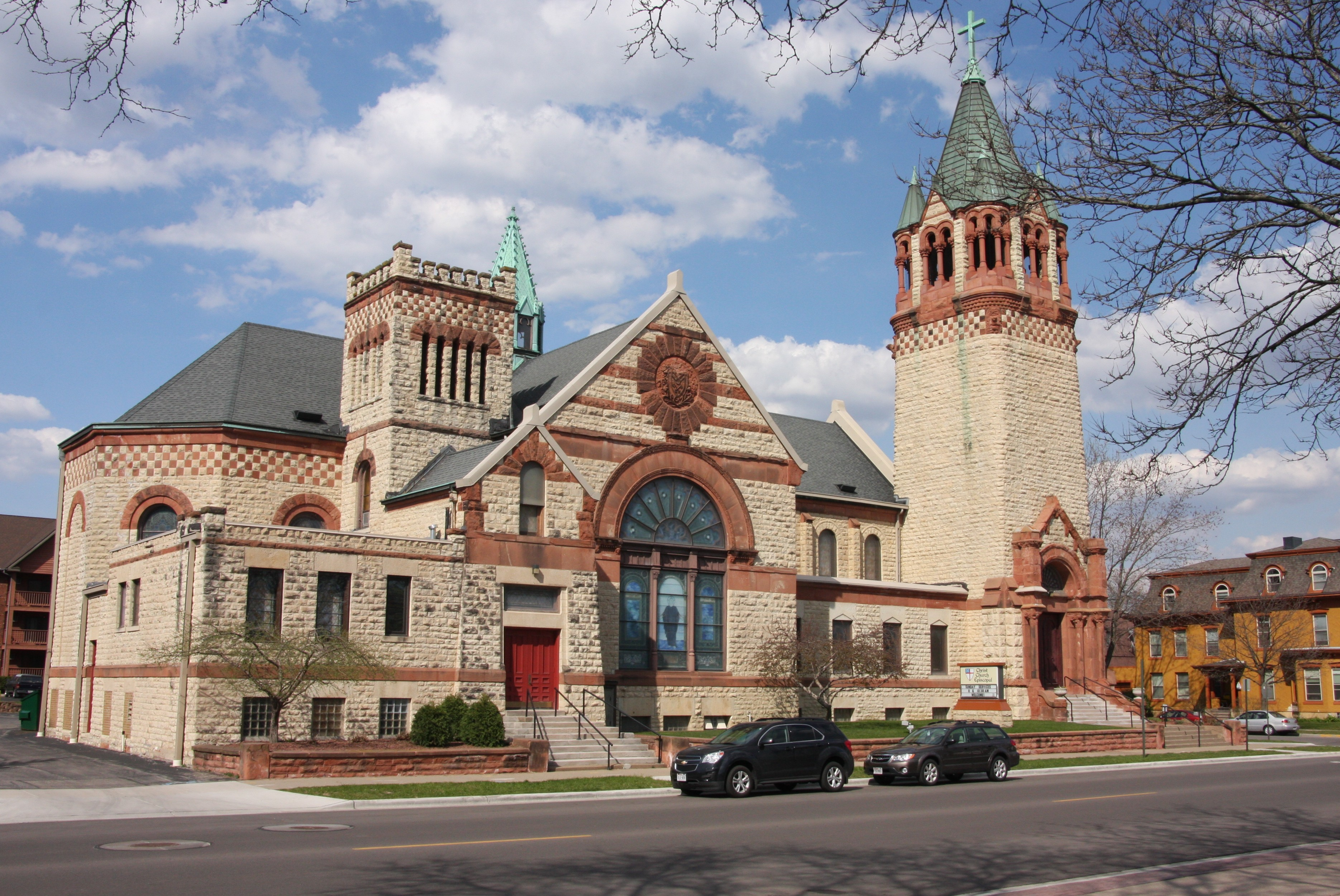
- Location: 831 Main Street; La Crosse, Wisconsin
- Coordinates: 43.8119°N 91.2445°W
- Built: 1899
- Architect: M.S. Detweiler
- Architectural style: Romanesque Revival
- NRHP reference No.: 85001361
- Added to NRHP: June 19, 1985

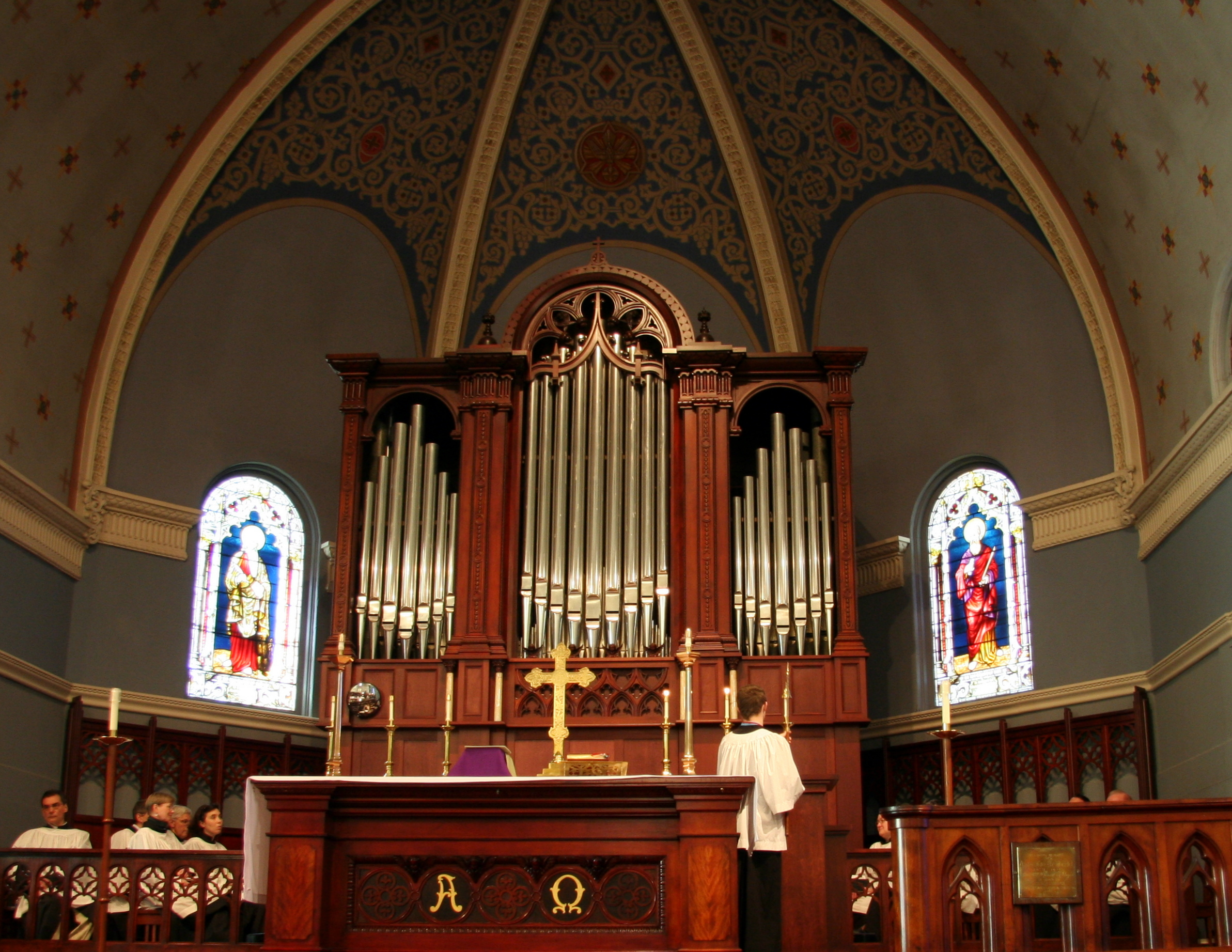
The front interior of the church during a Sunday service

Christ Episcopal Church is a historic Episcopal church located in La Crosse, Wisconsin in the Episcopal Diocese of Wisconsin. In 1985, Christ Church was added to the National Register of Historic Places. It was formerly in the jurisdiction of the Episcopal Diocese of Eau Claire.

In 2016, the church reported 299 members; in 2023, it reported 165 members. No membership statistics were reported in 2024 national parochial reports. Average Sunday Attendance ASA reported in 2024 was 72 persons. This was a relative decrease on ASA of 134 in 2017. Plate and pledge financial support reported by the church in 2024 was $235,401.

== History ==
On June 23, 1850, on top of Grandad Bluff, James Lloyd Breck had celebrated the first Episcopal Holy Communion in the La Crosse area. Christ Episcopal Church was founded in 1856.

The congregation had a small neo-gothic church on the same site, but had outgrown it by the late 19th century. The present church was designed by M.S. Detweiler, though he died before its completion. His daughter oversaw its completion in 1899. The church was constructed using limestone from Grandad Bluff and was built in a Romanesque Revival style.

Patrick Augustine served as rector for 16 years.

== See also ==
- List of Registered Historic Places in Wisconsin
