= Lambeth Awards =

Awards of the Archbishop of Canterbury

The Lambeth Awards are awarded by the Archbishop of Canterbury. In addition to the Lambeth degrees, there are a number of non-academic awards. Before 2016, these awards consisted of the Lambeth Cross, the Canterbury Cross, and the Cross of St Augustine. In 2016, these awards were expanded with six new awards named after previous Archbishops of Canterbury.

== List of awards ==
- Archbishop of Canterbury's Award for Outstanding Service to the Anglican Communion
- Cross of St Augustine for Services to the Anglican Communion (in bronze, silver, or gold)
- Lambeth Cross for Ecumenism
- Canterbury Cross for Services to the Church of England
- The Dunstan Award for Prayer and the Religious Life
- The Hubert Walter Award for Reconciliation and Interfaith Cooperation
- The Alphege Award for Evangelism and Witness
- The Lanfranc Award for Education and Scholarship
- The Langton Award for Community Service
- The Thomas Cranmer Award for Worship

== Archbishop of Canterbury's Award for Outstanding Service to the Anglican Communion ==
The Archbishop of Canterbury's Award for Outstanding Service to the Anglican Communion is the highest award within the Anglican Communion. It is a very rare honour and has only been awarded twice.

== Cross of St Augustine for Services to the Anglican Communion ==
The Cross of St Augustine was created in 1965 by Archbishop Michael Ramsey. It is the second highest award of the Anglican Communion and has three grades - bronze, silver and gold.

== Lambeth Cross for Ecumenism ==
The Lambeth Cross for Ecumenism was originally created in 1940. It is awarded "to those who have made an outstanding contribution to ecumenical work in support of the Church of England or to those who have made exceptional contributions to relations between the faiths".

=== List of recipients ===
2004

- Brother Roger

2016

- Anba Angaelos, "for his contributions to ecumenical and interfaith engagement and his tireless commitment to peace and reconciliation"
- Gregorios Theocharous, "for his contributions to Church relations, the integration and education of the Greek community in Great Britain and the promotion of respect between communities"
- Simon Stephens, " for his significant contribution to ecumenism, especially with the Eastern Orthodox Churches"

2017

- Agnes Abuom, "for her exceptional contribution to the Ecumenical Movement, for her work with the World Council of Churches and currently its Moderator"
- John Glass, "for leading the Elim Pentecostal Church into new ecumenical relationships and for his commitment to Christian unity in evangelism"
- Peter Howdle, "for his outstanding contribution to Anglican-Methodist relations"
- Antje Jackelén, "for her services to ecumenism - especially her leadership in addressing human, theological and social issues in partnership and dialogue"
- Kallistos Ware, "for his outstanding contribution to Anglican-Orthodox theological dialogue"

2021

- Aidan Harker, "For his wholehearted, wide-ranging and sustained commitment to ecumenism"
- Bruce Kent and Valerie Flessati, "For exceptional, tireless and lifelong dedication to the Christian ecumenical search for peace, both individually and together."

2022

No awards.

== Canterbury Cross for Services to the Church of England ==
The Canterbury Cross for Services to the Church of England is awarded for "outstanding service to the Church of England".

=== List of recipients ===
2016

- Peter Beesley, "for his contribution to the practical application of ecclesiastical, property and charity law throughout and beyond the Church of England over a period of approximately 40 years"
- Philip Giddings, "for sustained excellence in voluntary service to the Church"
- Sarah Horsman, "for her contribution to the alleviation of clergy stress"
- Carl Lee, "for his contribution to the alleviation of clergy stress"
- Bob Mackintosh, "for his contribution to leadership development in the Church of England"

2017

- Peter Bruinvels, "for sustained and outstanding work in support of the Church of England"
- Paul Dillingham, "for sustained and outstanding service to the Anglican Church in Finland"
- Sir William Fittall, "for his outstanding and sustained contribution to the Church of England and to the Archbishops' Council in particular"
- Jane Kennedy, "for outstanding conservation work, including supervision of major projects, at Ely Cathedral, Newcastle Cathedral and Christ Church, Oxford"
- George Lings, "for leading significant research into church growth and planting which has had a long lasting effect on dioceses across the Church of England"
- Sir John Mummery, "for his outstanding contribution in the fields of clergy discipline and ecclesiastical law"
- John Rees, "for services to the Church of England as both a lawyer and a priest"
- Sir Andreas Whittam Smith, "for his outstanding contribution as First Estates Commissioner of the Church of England"

2018

- Rupert Bursell, "for his contribution to the understanding and application of ecclesiastical law in the Church of England"
- Michael Gilbert Clarke, "for outstanding service to church and society over many years"
- John Collins, "for his outstanding record in growing churches and training evangelists and leaders"
- Margaret Holness, "for sustained excellence as Education Correspondent of the Church Times for over twenty years"
- Andrew Nunn, "for outstanding and unstinting service to the Church's and the Archbishop's administration for 37 years"
- Rona Orme, "for outstanding work in the field of Christian education for children in Peterborough Diocese and beyond"

2020

- Melvyn Redgers OBE, "for outstanding continuous service in the vocation of Lay Reader since 1958."

2021

- Charles George QC, "For his unique contribution to the application and development of ecclesiastical law."

2022

- Charlie Arbuthnot, "for outstanding contribution to the Church of England in chairing the Archbishops’ Commission on Housing, Church and Community."
- Sir Mark Hedley, "for outstanding service to the diocese of Liverpool and the Anglican Church as a Chancellor and Lay Reader."
- Queen Elizabeth II, "for unstinting support of the Church throughout her reign."

2023

- Lee Marshall, Chief of Staff, Church of England Pensions Board, "for outstanding service to diversity and inclusion in the Church of England, particularly in the National Church Institutions".

== Dunstan Award for Prayer and the Religious Life ==
The Dunstan Award for Prayer and the Religious Life is named after St Dunstan (Archbishop of Canterbury in the 10th century). It is awarded for "outstanding contributions to the renewal of Prayer and the Religious Life".

=== List of recipients ===
2016

- Fr. Laurent Fabre, "for services towards the renewal of Religious Life"
- Brother Samuel SSF, "for his contribution to revitalising the religious life"

2017

- Adrian Chatfield, "for outstanding contributions to prayer and spiritual formation through the work of the Simeon Centre at Ridley Hall, Cambridge"
- Abbot Stuart Burns OSB, "for his outstanding contribution both to the Burford Community and its move to Mucknell Abbey and his wider involvement nationally in developing and supporting Fresh Expressions of the Religious Life"

2022

- Fr. George Westhaver, "for his outstanding service as Principal of Pusey House since 2013 and for keeping up the witness of the Church to the World before and through the pandemic."

== Hubert Walter Award for Reconciliation and Interfaith Cooperation ==
The Hubert Walter Award for Reconciliation and Interfaith Cooperation is named after Hubert Walter (Archbishop of Canterbury from 1193 to 1205). It is awarded for "an outstanding contribution in the areas of reconciliation and interfaith cooperation".

=== List of recipients ===
2016

- Bill Marsh, "for his outstanding work in mediation"
- Ibrahim Mogra, "for his sustained contribution to understanding between the Abrahamic faiths"
- Sir Andrew Pocock, "for his service to peace and stability in Nigeria"
- David Rosen, "for his commitment and contribution to the work of Inter Religious relations between, particularly, the Jewish and Catholic faiths"
- Martin Turner, "for his work in post-war reconciliation with Germany"

2017

- Samuel Azariah, "for outstanding dedication to supporting and strengthening the work of women and young people in the Church of Pakistan, and for fostering ecumenical relations among Christians in Pakistan"
- Jane Clements, "for her outstanding contribution to Christian-Jewish understanding and, especially, her leadership of the Council of Christians and Jews"
- Bill Musk, "for his contributions to the understanding of Islam for non-Muslims, through his outstanding five books on Islam and his many articles on the subject"
- Paride Taban, "for his contribution to reconciliation and interfaith cooperation in Southern Sudan"

2020

- Jocelyn Armstrong, "for her outstanding contribution to interfaith relations in New Zealand"
- The Rev. Canon Paul-Gordon Chandler, "for his distinct and exceptional contribution in using the arts for interreligious peacebuilding around the world"
- Abdul Muquaddas Choudhuri, "for outstanding work in the area of Interfaith Cooperation"
- Jan Pike, "for her outstanding commitment and contribution to grass roots inter-faith and cross-cultural work"
- The Reverend Canon Stephen Williams, "for an outstanding contribution and commitment to building relationships between Christians and Jews in Manchester"

== Alphege Award for Evangelism and Witness ==
The Alphege Award for Evangelism and Witness is named after St Alphege (Archbishop of Canterbury in the 11th century). It is awarded for evangelism and witness.

=== List of recipients ===
2016

- Chrysogon Bamber, "for her distinguished service and leadership in Reader ministry"
- John Coles, "for his contribution to Missio Dei"
- Pamela Cooper, "for her contribution to the church in Japan over 41 years between 1968 and 2008"
- Susan C. Essam, "for her contribution to Theological Education by Extension in Nigeria"
- Agu Irukwu, "for his contribution to the sustainable spread of the gospel of Jesus Christ in the United Kingdom and beyond"
- Tim Royle, "for his contribution to the life of the Church of England for more than sixty years as an evangelical preacher, innovator and enabler"

2017

- Philip Fletcher, "for outstanding leadership in mission through his chairmanship of the Mission and Public Affairs Council"
- Robert and Mary Hopkins, "for outstanding contributions to fresh expressions of church"

2021

- The Revd Omid Moludy, "for the outstanding role that he has played in evangelism and discipleship amongst ethnically diverse communities"

== Lanfranc Award for Education and Scholarship ==
The Lanfranc Award for Education and Scholarship is named after Lanfranc (Archbishop of Canterbury in the 11th century). It is awarded for education and scholarship.

=== List of recipients ===
2016

- David V. Day, "for his contribution to Christian education and preaching"
- Maureen Hogarth, "for her exemplary career in teaching imbued with Christian values"
- Eeva John, "for her contribution to the development of theological education for ministry and mission across England"

2017

- Zoë Bennett, "for her outstanding contribution to theological education in East Anglia and beyond"
- Jeremy Morris, "for outstanding contributions as a teacher, scholar, and nurturer of the desire to learn, which have influenced the next generation of ordinands and enhanced the Church of England's self-understanding"
- Haifa Najjar, "for her outstanding contribution to education in Jordan and her exemplary leading role in Jordanian society as a Christian woman"
- Colin Podmore, "for services to education and scholarship in support of the Church of England and the wider Church"

2020

- Lydia Muthoni Mwaniki, "For her prayerful, post-colonial interpretation of the New Testament, astute advocacy of gender justice, and articulate joy in Christ, which have influenced church leaders and the education and hope of innumerable women throughout Africa"
- Anthony G. Reddie, "For his exceptional and sustained contribution to Black Theology in Britain and beyond."
- John Swinton, "For his outstanding contribution to practical theology, particularly in the area of disability."

== Langton Award for Community Service ==
The Langton Award for Community Service is named after Stephen Langton (Archbishop of Canterbury in the 13th century). It is awarded "for outstanding contribution to the community in accordance with the Church's teaching".

=== List of recipients ===
2016

- Sir Tony Baldry, "for his community service, especially as an advocate for the continuing contribution of parish churches to the common good"
- Geoff Davies, "for his farsighted commitment to environmental concerns"
- Joel Edwards, "for his unique contribution in uniting evangelical Christians across the UK in challenging global injustice"
- Duncan Green, "for his contribution to the London 2012 Olympic and Paralympic Games"
- Arthur Hawes, "for his contribution to the ministry of the Church of England, particularly in the area of mental health"
- Sir Hector Sants, "for his contribution to the Church of England's work for the common good in all communities"

2017

- Joan Ashton, "for outstanding work for the Community of Rotherham General Hospital as Coordinator of Chaplaincy work"
- Frank Field, "for sustained and outstanding commitment to social welfare"
- Suhaila Tarazi, "for outstanding service to the community in one of the poorest and most neglected corners of the world, overseeing with a calm grace, the provision of vital medical services at the Al Ahli Arab Hospital, Gaza"

== Cranmer Award for Worship ==
The Cranmer Award for Worship is named after Thomas Cranmer (Archbishop of Canterbury from 1533 to 1555). It is awarded for "outstanding contributions to all aspects of worship in the Church, including both words and music".

=== List of recipients ===
2016

- James Lancelot, "for his contribution to cathedral worship through excellence in the practice of music within the liturgy"
- Philip Moore, "for his contribution to the English choral tradition as a composer, arranger and performer"
- Michael Perham, for his work on Common Worship
- Matt Redman, "for his contribution to the worship life of the Church"
- Michael Williams, "for his distinguished contribution to church music in the Diocese of Derby and beyond"

2017

- Ralph Allwood, "for services to choral music in the Church of England and especially for fostering musical education amongst disadvantaged children"
- Vicky Beeching, "for outstanding contributions to contemporary worship music"
- Anne Harrison, "for her sustained and outstanding contribution to music in worship"
- Tim Hughes, "for his outstanding contribution to contemporary worship music
- Stuart Townend, "for his outstanding contribution to contemporary worship music"

2018

- John L. Bell, "for his outstanding Christian witness, through hymn-writing, broadcasting and social action."
- Bernadette Farrell, "for her outstanding contribution to music in Christian worship."
- Geonyong Lee, "for his outstanding contribution to Korean-language Christian worship music."

2020

- Pam Rhodes, "For her outstanding work in hosting Songs of Praise on the BBC for over 30 years.
- Richard Watson, "For his unparalleled contribution to the study and promotion of the use of our heritage of hymnody in Christian worship."

2021

- Kerry Beaumont, "For outstanding service to music and worship at the cathedrals of St Davids, Ripon and Coventry, with particular reference at Coventry to outreach, recruitment and nurture of boy and girl choristers to create a cathedral choir with diversity at its heart."
- Rupert Lang, "For more than forty years as an outstanding organist and choir director, Rupert Lang’s innovative and beautiful compositions have enhanced the liturgy and mission of the Church and extended the reach of Canadian liturgical music to secular audiences around the world"

2022

- Andrew Earis, "For extraordinary musical ministry during the pandemic, supporting the Church of England by sourcing and recording music for the weekly online services every week and curating selections of music suitable for use in local parishes’ live or online services."
- Geraldine Latty, "For her significant contribution to music in Christian worship, as a singer-songwriter, worship leader, choir director, teacher and recording artist."

2024
