= Albert Nolan =

South African Catholic priest and friar (1934–2022)

Albert Nolan OP (2 September 1934 – 17 October 2022) was a South African Catholic priest, theologian writer and member of the Dominican Order. He is well known for his book, Jesus Before Christianity, first published in 1976, in which he presented an account of Jesus' radical involvement in the struggle for full humanity in the context of first-century Judea. It has sold more than 150,000 copies.

== Life ==
Nolan was born in Cape Town, South Africa, on 2 September 1934 as a fourth-generation South African of Irish descent. Reading the works of Thomas Merton, Nolan became attracted to the idea of religious life. Eventually he joined the Dominican Order in 1954, and studied in South Africa and Rome, where he received a doctorate.

In the 1960s, he taught theology at the Dominican training institution in South Africa, associated with the University of Stellenbosch. During the 1970s, he was national chaplain to the National Catholic Federation of Students, an affiliate of the International Movement of Catholic Students.

From 1976 to 1984, he was Vicar-General of the Dominicans in South Africa. In 1983, he was elected Master of the Order of Preachers. He however declined the office which would have meant transferring to his order's Rome headquarters, preferring to remain in South Africa during this decade of intense political and social transition. During this period he worked for the Institute for Contextual Theology, and was involved in the circle of pastors and theologians who started the process that led to the Kairos Document in 1985.

In the 1990s, as a result of his conviction that theology must come from the grassroots level and not an academic, he started a radical church magazine called Challenge, of which he was the editor for many years. From 2000 to 2004, Nolan served a third term as Vicar-General of the Dominicans in South Africa.

== Jesus Before Christianity ==
Nolan is well known for his book, Jesus Before Christianity, first published in 1976, in which he presented an account of Jesus' radical involvement in the struggle for full humanity in the context of first-century Judea: he "challenged the rich to identify in solidarity with the poor, a spirituality of solidarity that resonated with white Catholics seeking a new, progressive direction" . The book was translated into nine languages, and 15th and 25th anniversary editions have been published.

Jesus Before Christianity is the short title of the book Jesus Before Christianity: The Gospel of Liberation, by Albert Nolan. Published London: Darton, Longman and Todd. ISBN 0-232-51373-2. in 1972 (Rev. ed. 1992 and 2001) Also published by Orbis Books (US). The logic of the title Jesus Before Christianity is that before there was Christianity, there was a Jewish Jesus, who was the incarnated Jesus. And this Jesus acted upon the world. The book starts by examining the what regarding the situation of the world in part 1 Catastrophe. It goes on to examine the how of Jesus' action to the world in part 2 Praxis and again the what in part 3 Good News this time regarding the message Jesus brought. Part 4 describes the drama in Conflict between good and bad. Jesus Before Christianity thus retains the biblical themes of The Kingdom of God and The Good News.

It contributes to Theology of Liberation by presenting the Gospel per se as the liberating event.

Nolan published his second major work, God in South Africa in 1988. At one point during the writing process he 'went underground' to hide from the Security Forces during the state of emergency in South Africa. God in South Africa is a primary example of contextual theology: written as a theology for that particular moment, without a claim to its possible relevance in other times and places. In 2006, Nolan published his Jesus Today: A Spirituality of Radical Freedom.

== Death ==
Nolan died in his sleep at Marian House in Johannesburg, in the early hours of 17 October 2022.

== Public honours ==
In 1990, Albert Nolan received an honorary doctorate from Regis College, Toronto.

In 2003, the South African government awarded him the Order of Luthuli in silver, in recognition of "his life-long dedication to the struggle for democracy, human rights and justice and for challenging the religious dogma including theological justification of apartheid".

On 15 November 2008, the Master of the Dominican Order, Fr Carlos Azpiroz Costa promoted Nolan to a Master of Sacred Theology in recognition of the significant contribution he has made to theological research and debate.

== Publications ==
- — (1976). Jesus Before Christianity: The Gospel of Liberation. D. Philip. ISBN 978-0-949968-59-3. reprinted 1978, 1985, 1988, 1992, 2001.
- — (1984). The Service of the Poor and Spiritual Growth: Taking Sides. Catholic Institute for International Relations (CIIR) and Catholic Truth Society (CTS). ISBN 978-0-946848-40-9.
- — (1986). Biblical Spirituality. Order of Preachers (Southern Africa).
- — (1988). God in South Africa: The Challenge of the Gospel. Philip. ISBN 978-0-86486-076-7.
- — (2006). Jesus Today: A Spirituality of Radical Freedom. Double Storey. ISBN 978-1-77013-111-8.
- — (2009). Muyebe, Stanslaus (ed.). Hope in an Age of Despair: And Other Talks and Writings. Orbis Books. ISBN 978-1-57075-835-5.
