= Patrick Augustine =

South Sudanese bishop

Augustine in 2019

Patrick Pervez Augustine is an Anglican Missionary Bishop of the Diocese of Diocese of Bor in the Episcopal Church of South Sudan.

A native of Pakistan, Augustine served as rector of St. Thomas Church, Islamabad. He moved to the U.S. and was rector of Christ Episcopal Church in La Crosse, Wisconsin for 16 years. He also served as Canon and Commissary in the U.S. to the Anglican Archbishop of Sudan. In 2008 he earned Doctor of Ministry from Virginia Theological Seminary, Alexandria, Virginia.

In 2012, Augustine was awarded the Cross of St Augustine by Rowan Williams, Archbishop of Canterbury, "in recognition of his contribution at national and international level to the promotion of evangelism, ecumenism, and the free exercise of faith." In 2013 he was awarded an honorary Doctor of Divinity by Nashotah House Seminary, Wisconsin. In 2015 Virginia Theological Seminary conferred on him Doctor of Divinity. In July 2018 at the General Convention of Episcopal Church the Episcopal Peace Fellowship awarded him The John Nevin Sayer Award.
