= Archbishop of Canterbury's Award for Outstanding Service to the Anglican Communion =

The Archbishop of Canterbury's Award for Outstanding Service to the Anglican Communion is the highest award within the Anglican Communion. It was created by Archbishop George Carey to mark the retirement of Archbishop Desmond Tutu, who was its first recipient.

== Recipients ==
- Desmond Tutu, Archbishop of Cape Town
- Robin Eames, Archbishop of Armagh

== Precedence ==
Within the world-wide Anglican Communion, the Archbishop of Canterbury's Award for Outstanding Service to the Anglican Communion is the highest level of award achievable. It ranks next above the Cross of St Augustine which is awarded for exceptional service to the Anglican Church.

The Lambeth Awards were expanded in March 2016 by Archbishop Justin Welby, by the addition of the six new awards based upon his ministry priority areas. The full suite of non-academic awards now complement the academic awards available through the Lambeth degrees.
