= Robert S. Heaney =

Anglican theologian, born 1972

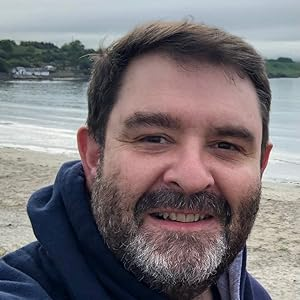
- Born: Robert Stewart Heaney; 15 March 1972 (age 54); Newry, Northern Ireland

Academic background
- Education: London School of Theology; University of Oxford

Academic work
- Institutions: Virginia Theological Seminary

Robert Stewart Heaney (born 15 March 1972) is a theologian and Anglican priest ordained in the Church of Ireland. A faculty member of Virginia Theological Seminary (VTS) since 2013, he is Professor of Theology and Mission. From 2013 to 2020 he served as Director of VTS's Center for Anglican Communion Studies. He is a theologian of culture, Anglicanism, missiology, and postcolonialism.

== Early life and education ==
Heaney was born in Newry, Northern Ireland on March 15, 1972. Educated at Kilkeel High School he obtained a Bachelor of Arts in theology from the London School of Theology and a Master of Theology from the University of Oxford. He holds a Doctor of Philosophy (Ph.D.) in theology from the Milltown Institute of Theology and Philosophy where he worked with James Corkery S.J. and he holds a Doctor of Philosophy (D.Phil.) in theology from the University of Oxford where he worked with Christopher Rowland.

== Career and service ==
Heaney was ordained deacon in the Cathedral Church of St. Patrick, Trim, Dioceses of Meath and Kildare in 2001 and ordained priest in the Cathedral Church of St. Brigid in 2002.

From 2007 to 2010, he was a Tutor in Doctrine, Regent's Park College, University of Oxford and then from 2010 to 2013 Senior Lecturer in the School of Theology and Religious Studies, St. John's University of Tanzania, Director of Postgraduate Studies and Research, St. John's University of Tanzania and a member of the Senior Management Team, St. John's University of Tanzania.

In 2013, he became assistant professor of Christian Mission, Virginia Theological Seminary and was promoted to associate professor in 2015. Since 2020, he has been Professor of Theology and Mission, Virginia Theological Seminary.

In 2016, the Archbishop of Canterbury appointed Heaney to serve on the Design Group for the fifteenth Lambeth Conference (the decennial assembly of Anglican bishops from the Anglican Communion). He facilitated the two most contentious "Lambeth Calls" for the conference, the Call on "Anglican Identity" and the Call on "Human Dignity."

In 2016, Heaney was awarded the Susan B. Thomas Prize for commitment to excellence in education and the mission of the Episcopal Church and in 2022, he was awarded the Cross of St. Augustine for outstanding service to the Anglican Communion.

== Personal life ==
He is married to theologian, Sharon Elizabeth Heaney and has one son.

== Selected publications ==
=== Books authored ===
- From Historical to Critical Post-Colonial Theology (Wipf & Stock, 2016).
- Post-Colonial Theology: Finding God and Each Other Amidst the Hate (Cascade, 2019).
- The Promise of Anglicanism with William L. Sachs (SCM, 2019).

=== Books edited ===
- Faithful Neighbors: Christian-Muslim Vision and Practice with Zeyneb Sayilgan (Morehouse, 2016).
- God's Church for God's World with John Kafwanka and Hilda Kabia (Church Publishing, 2020).
- Building Dialogue: Stories, Scripture, and Liturgy in International Peacebuilding (Seabury Books, 2022) with John Y.H. Yieh and Jean A. Cotting.
- Reconciling Practices: Listening, Praying and Witnessing in the Midst of Division with Jacques B. Hadler Jr., and Hartley Hobson Wensing (VTS Press, 2022).
- When Churches in Communion Disagree with Christopher Wells and Pierre Whalon (Pickwick, 2022).

=== Chapters and articles ===
- "Towards the Possibility of Impassibilist Pastoral Care." The Heythrop Journal 48:2 (2007): 171–186.
- "Conversion to Coloniality: Avoiding the Colonization of Method." International Review of Mission 97:384/385 (2008): 65–77.
- "Coloniality and Theological Method in Africa." Journal of Anglican Studies 7:1 (2009): 55–65.
- "Views of Colonization Across the Communion." In The Wiley-Blackwell Companion to the Anglican Communion eds. Justyn Terry, Barney Hawkins, Leslie Steffensen and Ian Markham. Blackwell, 2013, 726–738.
- "Prospects and Problems for Evangelical Postcolonialisms" in eds. Kay Higuera Smith, Jayachitra Lalitha and L. Daniel Hawk, Evangelical Postcolonial Conversations: Global Awakenings in Theology and Praxis. IVP Academic, 2014.
- "Principles for Constructive Interfaith Conversation" with Zeyneb Sayilgan in eds. Heaney, Sayilgan and Haymes, Faithful Neighbors, 2016.
- "Anglicanism in Southern Africa during the Twentieth Century" in ed. William L. Sachs, The Oxford History of Anglicanism, Volume V: Global Anglicanism, c.1900-2000. Oxford: Oxford University Press, 2018, 321–344.
- "Missiology and Ministry" in eds. Martyn Percy, Emma Percy, and Ian Markham, SPCK Study of Ministry. London: SPCK, 2019, 279–291.
- "Public Theology and Public Missiology." Anglican Theological Review 102:2 (2020): 201–212.
- "Moral Skepticism and Education: Approaching Integrative Education in a Christian University" in Fergus King, Emmanuel Mbennah, Mecka Ogunde, and Dorthy Prentice eds., Nuru na Uzima: Essays Celebrating the Golden Jubilee of the Anglican Church of Tanzania 1970–2020. Missional University Press, 2021, 117–129.
- "The Call of the Church" in Robert S. Heaney, John Yueh-Yieh eds. with Jean A. Cotting, Building Dialogue: Witness Amidst Conflict. New York: Seabury Books, 2022.
- "Testimony" in Joseph S. Pagano and Amy E. Richter eds., Saving Words. Eugene: Cascade, 2022.
- "Reconciling Practices: A Process in Formation Amidst Deep Disagreement" in Robert S. Heaney, Jacques B. Hadler Jr., and Hartley Hobson Wensing, Reconciling Practices: Listening, Praying and Witnessing in the Midst of Division. Alexandria: VTS Press, 2022, 1–14.
