= Rupert Bursell =

British barrister and Anglican priest

Rupert David Hingston Bursell, KC (born 10 November 1942) is a British barrister and Anglican priest, educated at St John's School, Leatherhead, the University of Exeter (LLB) and St Edmund Hall, Oxford (MA, DPhil). He was a circuit judge from 1988 to 2008, a senior circuit judge from 2003 to 2008, and a deputy high court judge from 2009 to 2011. He was also the Chancellor of the Diocese of Durham from 1989 to 2017, of the Diocese of Bath and Wells from 1992 to 1993, of the Diocese of St Albans from 1992 to 2002, and the Diocese of Oxford from 2002 to 2013.

== Honours ==
In 2018, Bursell was awarded the Canterbury Cross for Services to the Church of England "for his contribution to the understanding and application of ecclesiastical law in the Church of England".

== Selected works ==
- Bursell, Rupert D. H. (1996). Liturgy, order and the law. Oxford: Clarendon Press. ISBN 978-0198262497.
