= Ibrahim Mogra =

British imam

Imam Ibrahim Mogra

Personal life
- Born: 1965 (age 60–61) Gujarat, India
- Education: Darul Uloom Bury; Al-Azhar University; School of Oriental and African Studies

Religious life
- Religion: Islam
- Denomination: Sunni
- Movement: Deobandi

Muslim leader
- Awards: Honorary Doctor of Letters by De Montfort University; Hubert Walter Award 2016

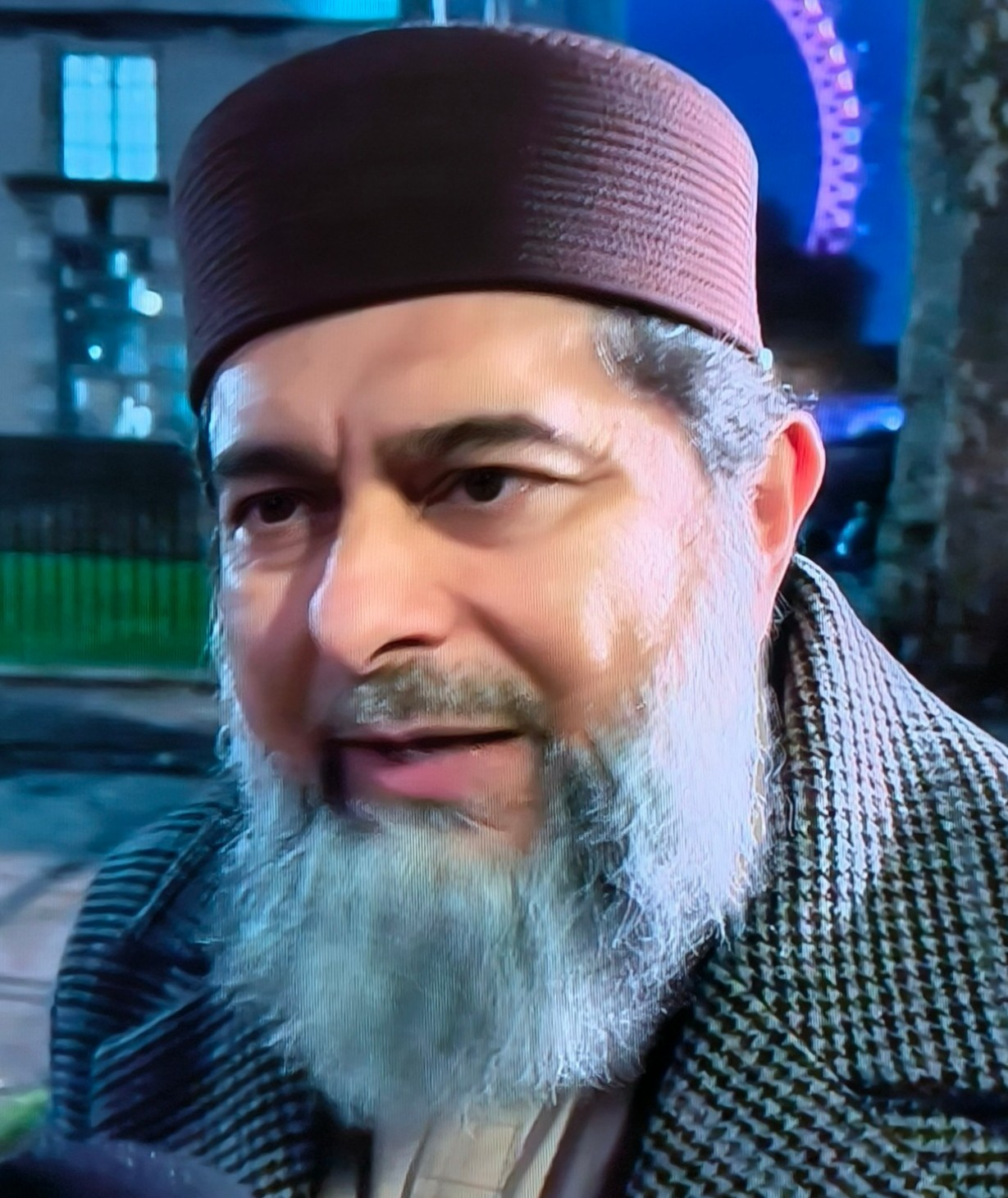
Mogra speaking at an interfaith gathering in London

Ibrahim Mogra is an imam from Leicester and former Assistant Secretary General of the Muslim Council of Britain.

== Early life ==
Mogra was born in 1965 into a family of Gujarati Indian origin and emigrated to the UK at the age of 18 to study and settle. He was educated at Darul Uloom Bury, Holcombe, Greater Manchester; Al-Azhar University, Cairo; and the School of Oriental and African Studies, London. He is the founder and principal of Khazinatul-'Ilm, Madaris of Arabic and Muslim Life Studies, in Leicester.

== Career ==
In 2000, he contributed to BBC Radio 2's Faith in The Nation examination of the afterlife amongst the main religious faiths. He has been a panellist on The Big Questions, a faith and ethics television programme broadcast live on BBC One.

He has contributed to and written for The Guardian.

In 2018, Mogra served on a panel of judges for the '21 for 21' interfaith awards, a collaborative project by The Jewish News, The Church Times and British Muslim TV.

== Views ==
=== British Muslims and interfaith relations ===
Mogra believes that for British Muslims "our loyalty to Britain must be unquestionable".

Mogra has been a representative for Jewish-Muslim relations appreciating the similarities of communities governed by a code of law and ethics (Torah and Qur'an) and religious festivals and holy days. Asked to choose a favourite film for The Clerics' Choice in The Daily Telegraph, Mogra picked The Message, explaining that "you see through the eyes of the camera, as the Messenger would have seen it".

He has worked closely with Abu Eesa Niamatullah, Strategic Director of the 1st Ethical Charitable Trust.

Mogra has also been an active supporter of the Armed Forces Muslim Association, appearing as a guest speaker and providing spiritual advice to Muslims serving in the British military.

=== Grooming scandals ===
In April 2013, Mogra took part in an interview on BBC Radio 4, condemning the men at the centre of the Rochdale sex trafficking scandal. He said that sexual grooming of non-Muslim girls by Muslim gangs was abhorrent behaviour that was unacceptable regardless of race or religion. He expressed that as some of the perpetrators happened to be from a Muslim background, it was the duty of the entire Muslim community to condemn their actions. However, he also cautioned that the scandal should be seen purely as criminal behaviour, warning that using labels of race and religion could "drive the problem deeper underground". Mogra also said that the Muslim Council was also working with different groups such as the National Society for the Prevention of Cruelty to Children, police and other Muslim groups to speak out against such crimes and assist in tackling the problem.

=== Boris Johnson and the niqab ===
In 2018, responding to comments on the niqab by then Foreign Secretary Boris Johnson, Mogra criticised Johnson's choice of words, describing them as "insensitive." He added that Muslim women "have already been victims of violence on our streets," and that using such offensive language would make their situation worse. He also said that Muslims were "not against criticism of the faith," but that there are more important topics that affect Muslim communities, for which debate should be prioritised over what Muslim women may or may not wear.

== Honours and achievements ==
In 2016, he was awarded the Hubert Walter Award for Reconciliation and Interfaith Cooperation by the Archbishop of Canterbury "for his sustained contribution to understanding between the Abrahamic faiths".

In January 2016, he was awarded an honorary Doctor of Letters by De Montfort University in recognition of his interfaith work and "the work he has done to build bridges between communities across the country and globally." Mogra said that he was "humbled and honoured" by the accolade.
