= Africa Bible Commentary =

2006 book

- First Edition Cover
- Author: Tokunboh Adeyemo
- Language: English/Swahili
- Genre: Bible commentary
- Publisher: WordAlive Publishers Zondervan
- Publication date: 2006
- Media type: Print (Hardback)
- Pages: 1586 pp
- ISBN: 978-9966-805-78-2

The Africa Bible Commentary is a one-volume commentary on all the books of the Bible developed in Africa by African scholars. The aim of the Africa Bible Commentary is to relate the Bible to African realities of today. Along with commentary on the Bible, there are 70 articles on issues such as HIV/AIDs that are affecting African churches and individuals. (See ACwiki for more details.)

Tokunboh Adeyemo was the general editor. He is the director for the Centre for Biblical Transformation and previously served as the general secretary for the Association of Evangelicals in Africa and First Chancellor of Africa International University (formerly Nairobi Evangelical Graduate School of Theology). He holds a Ph.D. from Dallas Theological Seminary and an honorary doctorate from Potchefstroom University.

In 2005 WordAlive Publishers was selected by the Africa Bible Commentary Board to be the commentary's publisher for Africa. WordAlive Publishers handles sales and distribution outside of the U.S. while Zondervan oversees U.S. sales.
