= St Augustine's Cross =

Stone memorial in Kent, England

Coordinates: 51.3283°N 1.3580°E

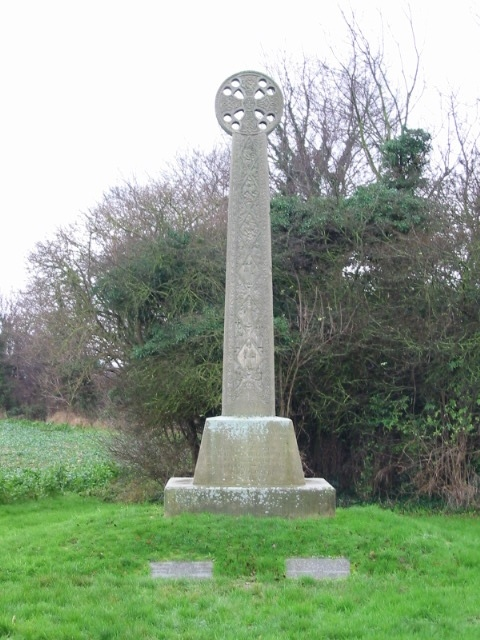
East face of St Augustine's Cross, viewed from the road

St Augustine's Cross is a stone memorial in Kent, in a fenced enclosure on the south side of Cottington Road, west of Cliffs End, at Pegwell Bay, Thanet, about 2 miles (3.2 km) west of Ramsgate, 3 miles (4.8 km) north of Richborough Roman Fort, and 12 miles (19 km) east of Canterbury, in the parish of Minster. The cross was erected in 1884 to commemorate the arrival of St Augustine in England in AD 597. It is believed to mark the place where St. Augustine met King Ethelbert for the first time.

== Background ==
In 595, Pope Gregory I selected the monk Augustine to lead a mission to England to convert the Anglo Saxons in the Kingdom of Kent to Christianity. The Gregorian mission landed in Kent in 597. Bede wrote in his Ecclesiastical History of the English People that "Over against the eastern districts of Kent there is a large island called Thanet which, in English reckoning, is 600 hides or families in extent. It is divided from the mainland by the river Wantsum, which is about three furlongs wide, can be crossed in two places only, and joins the sea at either end. Here Augustine, the servant of the Lord, landed with his companions, who are said to have been nearly forty in number. They had acquired interpreters from the Frankish race according to the command of Pope St Gregory." This has been interpreted as meaning that Augustine landed at Ebbsfleet.

== Cross ==
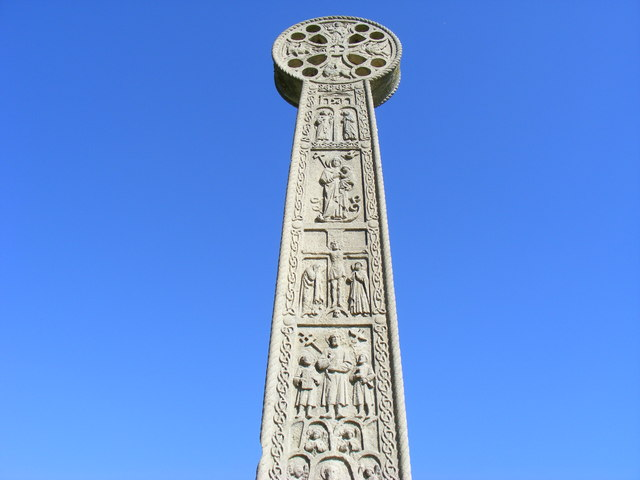
West face of the cross

The cross was commissioned and erected in 1884 by Granville Leveson-Gower, 2nd Earl Granville, Secretary of State for Foreign Affairs (1851–52, 1870–74, 1880–85) and Lord Warden of the Cinque Ports (1865-1891). He was inspired by a tradition associated with an oak tree known as the Augustine's Oak - felled within living memory - reputed to be the place where King Ethelbert first met Augustine. St Augustine's Well, a stream nearby, is reputedly the place where Augustine baptised his first convert. Ethelbert was reputedly baptised there on Whit Sunday, 597.

The cross was carved by John Roddis of Birmingham, using stone from a quarry in Doulting which was also used to build Glastonbury Abbey. The cross follows a Saxon or Celtic design based the Sandbach Crosses, early Christian examples from the 8th to 9th century from Sandbach in Cheshire. The tapering shaft about 12 feet (3.7 m) high stands on a stepped base, topped by a circular Celtic cross. The base and cross add another 8 feet (2.4 m). The complete monument is about 7 metres (23 ft) high. The sides of the shaft are decorated with a lozenge pattern and carvings of archbishops, angels and beasts.

On the west face of the cross are the emblems of the Four Evangelists - a man, a lion, a bull and an eagle. The west side of the shaft is decorated with rectangular panels showing the Annunciation, the Virgin and Child, the Crucifixion and the Transfiguration. The twelve Apostles are depicted on the north side and fourteen early Christian martyrs on the south. The east face of the cross is decorated with "runic motifs" which continue down the shaft, with diamond shaped panels depicting St Alban, St Augustine and St Ethelbert. Raised ropework corners with knotwork edging around the sides.

Nearby are the Hugin reconstructed Viking longship, Pegwell Bay Country Park, and St Augustine Golf Course.

== Plaque ==
The cross is accompanied by a metal plaque bearing a Latin inscription written by Henry Liddell, Dean of Christ Church, Oxford (1855–91), which commemorates the meeting between Augustine and Ethelbert, Augustine's first sermon, and the subsequent spread of Christianity across England. A separate plaque displays an English translation of the inscription.

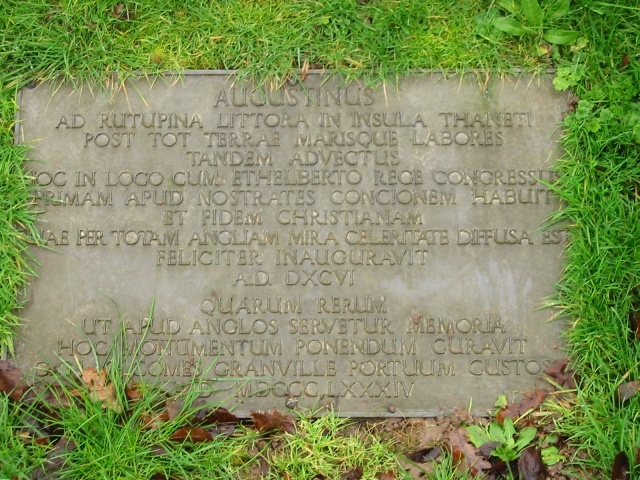
Plaque in Latin

Augustinus
ad Rutipina littora in insula Thaneti
post tot terrae marisque labores
tandem advectus
hoc in loco cum Ethelberto rege congressus
primam apud nostrates concionem habuit
et fidem christianam
quae per totam angliam mira celeritate diffusa est
feliciter inauguravit
A.D. DXCVI
quarum rerum
ut apud anglos servetur memoria
hoc monumentum ponendum curavit
G.G. L.-G. comes Granville Portuum Custos
A.D. MDCCCLXXXIV

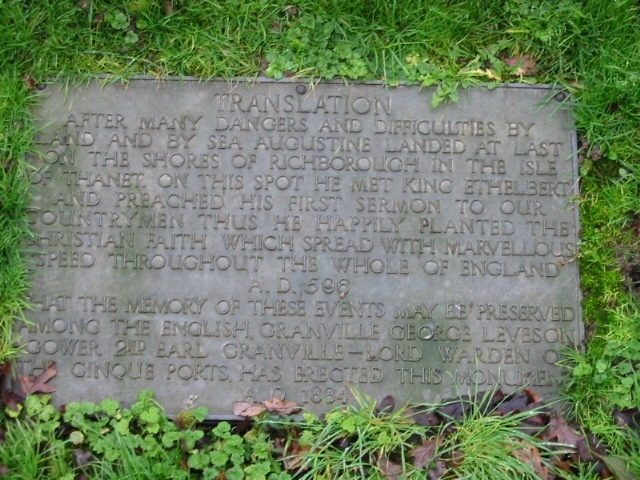
Plaque in English

== See also ==
- Shrine of St Augustine of Canterbury
- Cross of St Augustine
