= Anthony G. Reddie =

British-Caribbean academic and theologian (born 1964)

Professor Anthony G. Reddie
- Born: 1964 (age 61–62); Bradford, England
- Education: University of Birmingham
- Known for: Professor of Black Theology, Oxford; Professor Extraordinarious in Theological ethics at the University of South Africa
- Notable work: SCM Core Text: Black Theology
- Awards: Lanfranc Award

Anthony G. Reddie (born 1964) is a British theologian and academic who specialises in black theology. He is a professor of Black Theology and Director of the Centre of Black Theology at Regent’s Park College, University of Oxford. He is an Extraordinary Professor and Research Fellow of Theological Ethics at the University of South Africa.

== Biography ==
Reddie was born and raised in Bradford, West Yorkshire from a family of first-generation Caribbean migrants. He undertook tertiary education at the University of Birmingham, first with Bachelor of Arts in History (1987), then with PhD in Education (2000), supervised by Prof. John Hull.

He is one of the recipients of the 2020 Lanfranc Award delivered by the Archbishop of Canterbury to recognise his 'exceptional and sustained contribution to Black theology In Britain and beyond'.

== Career ==
Reddie's research in Black theology has been recognised by international bodies, particularly within the Republic of South Africa, where he is Professor Extraordinarious at the University of South Africa (UNISA). As a Research Fellow at UNISA his recent publications have been put in for scholarly assessment in the South African National Research Foundation (NRF), which is the equivalent of the UK Research Excellence Framework (REF). His research output has been assessed as ‘A Rating’, which means that he has been identified as a ‘Leading International Researcher’. He is the first Black scholar in Theology and Religious Studies to be given this rating in the history of the NRF in South Africa.

Reddie is also the Director of the Oxford Centre for Religion and Culture which aims to bring a critical inquiry to the interface of religion and culture as it relates to differing communities, contexts and peoples, across the world. He is also a Research Fellow at The Queen's Foundation, one of England’s oldest theological colleges training students for ordained ministry in the Church of England and the Methodist Church.

In 2023, Reddie gave the annual Sam Sharpe lecture entitled "From Sam Sharpe to Black Lives Matter: The Continued Struggle for Black Agency and Self-Determination".

== Published work ==
Reddie's PhD thesis was later turned into a monograph in 2003, under the title of Nobodies to Somebodies. His book SCM Core Text: Black Theology published in 2012 was the first text that examined Black theology through a participative model to investigate how practical theology impacts Black people in inner city, poor communities in Britain.

Reddie has been editor of the journal Black Theology since 2002 and was a member of the Executive Committee of the Society for the Study of Theology (SST).

=== Sole-authored ===
- Faith, Stories and the Experience of Black Elders: Singing the Lord's Song in a Strange Land. London: Jessica Kingsley Publishers. 2001.
- Nobodies to Somebodies: A Practical Theology for Education and Liberation. London: Epworth Press. 2003.
- Is God Colour-Blind? Insights from Black Theology for Christian Faith and Ministry. London: SPCK. 2010.
- Theologising Brexit: A Liberationist and Postcolonial Critique. Abingdon: Taylor and Francis. 2019.
- Introducing James H. Cone: A Personal Exploration. London: SCM Press. 2022.
- Living Black Theology: Decolonizing Knowledge. Oxford University Press. 2026.

=== Co-authored ===
- Postcolonial Black British Theology: New Textures and Themes. London: Epworth Press. 2007.

=== Edited ===
- Anthony G. Reddie, ed. (2010). Black Theology, Slavery and Contemporary Christianity: 200 Years and No Apology. London: Routledge.

=== Co-edited ===
- R. Drew Smith; William Ackah; Anthony G. Reddie; Rothney S. Tshaka, eds. (2018). Contesting Post-Racialism: Conflicted Churches in the United States and South Africa. Mississippi: University Press of Mississippi.
- Anthony G. Reddie; Carol Troupe, eds. (2023). Deconstructing Whiteness, Empire and Mission. London: SCM Press.

=== Works part of a series ===
- Acting in Solidarity: Reflections in Critical Christianity. London: Palgrave Macmillan. 2005.
- Dramatizing Theologies: A Participative Approach to Black God-Talk. Cross Cultural Theologies. London: Routledge. 2006.
- Black Theology in Transatlantic Dialogue. Black Religion/Womanist Thought/Social Justice. London: Palgrave Macmillan. 2006.
- Anthony G. Reddie; Michael N. Jagessar, eds. (2007). Black Theology in Britain: A Reader. Cross Cultural Theologies. London: Routledge.
- Against the Grain: Re-imaging Black Theology in the 21st Century. Cross Cultural Theologies. London: Routledge. 2008.
- Black Theology. SCM Core Text. London: SCM Press. 2012.
- Anthony G. Reddie; Wale Hudson-Roberts; Gale Richards, eds. (2017). Journeying to Justice: Contributions to the Baptist Tradition across the Black Atlantic. Studies in Baptist History and Thought. Milton Keynes: Paternoster Press.
- Anthony G Reddie; Seidel Abel Boanerges; Pamela Searle, eds. (2021). Intercultural Preaching. Centre for Baptist Studies in Oxford Congregational Resources. Oxford: CBS.
