= Dwight Hopkins =

American Baptist theologian (born 1953)

The Reverend Dwight Hopkins
- Born: Dwight Nathaniel Hopkins; February 22, 1953 (age 73); Richmond, Virginia, US

Ecclesiastical career
- Religion: Christianity (Baptist)
- Church: American Baptist Churches USA

Academic background
- Education: Harvard University; Union Theological Seminary; University of Cape Town
- Thesis: Black Theology U.S.A. & South Africa (1988); Down, Up and Over (2000)
- Academic advisor: James H. Cone

Academic work
- Discipline: Theology
- Sub-discipline: Constructive theology
- School or tradition: Black liberation theology
- Institutions: University of Chicago

Dwight Nathaniel Hopkins (born 1953) is an American theologian and ordained Baptist minister who serves as a professor of theology at the University of Chicago.

== Biography ==
Hopkins was born on February 22, 1953, in Richmond, Virginia. In 1976, he graduated Harvard University with a bachelor's degree. He earned his Master of Divinity (1984), Master of Philosophy (1987), and Doctor of Philosophy (1988) degrees from Union Theological Seminary. He has a second earned PhD degree from the University of Cape Town in South Africa, which became a basis for his book Down, Up and Over: Slave Religion and Black Theology (2000).

Hopkins is currently professor of theology at the Divinity School of University of Chicago. Hopkins is the communications coordinator for the International Association of Black Religions and Spiritualities, a Ford Foundation–sponsored global project.

Hopkins is a member of and teaches at Trinity United Church of Christ. Barack Obama was also formerly a member of this church.

In 2024 he was named Laura Spelman Rockefeller Professor at the University of Chicago Divinity School.

== Theology ==
Hopkins is a constructive theologian focusing on contemporary models of theology, black theology, and liberation theologies. He defines black theology as "how God, or the spirit of freedom, works with the oppressed black community for their full humanity." According to Hopkins black theology started with a full-page ad in the New York Times in 1966 by a few black pastors asking for a "theological interpretation of black power." Today it focuses on the area of asking how to include black churches and how to serve them in a crisis.

He began working with black theology when a colleague gave him a two-page article about it by James H. Cone from the Union Theological Seminary in the City of New York. After meeting with the dean at the seminary to discuss points in the article he was enrolled in their master's program and Cone was his new advisor.

Hopkins has commented on, and mentioned as a source of inspiration for black liberation theology by Jeremiah Wright. Wright was lead pastor at the church attended by presidential candidate Barack Obama, and the source of controversy regarding Obama. Hopkins attends and has spoken in defence of the Trinity United Church of Christ, often supporting Wright. Hopkins explains Wright's use of "God damn America" was taken out of context as it was theological wordplay, using the word "damn" straight out its specific meaning in the original Hebrew: "It means a sacred condemnation by God to a wayward nation who has strayed from issues of justice, strayed from issues of peace, strayed from issues of reconciliation". Hopkins also stated that attacks on Wright are actually attacks on the very institution of the black church: "To caricature and attack Jeremiah A. Wright Jr. is to attack the Black church in America.... Attempts to muzzle him and Trinity United Church of Christ in Chicago exemplify a bad omen for every African American preacher and every African American church in the country. And with the Black church censored, other Christian churches will be the next in line."

== Works ==
- Being Human: Race, Culture, and Religion, 2005.
- Cut Loose Your Stammering Tongue: Black Theology in the Slave Narratives, revised and expanded edition, 2003; co-editor.
- Global Voices for Gender Justice, co-editor with Ramathate Dolamo and Ana Maria Tepedino.
- Heart and Head: Black Theology Past, Present, and Future, 2002.
- Religions/Globalizations: Theories and Cases, 2001; co-editor.
- Black Faith & Public Talk: Essays in Honor of James H. Cone's "Black Theology and Black Power", 1999; editor.
- Down, Up & Over: Slave Religion and Black Theology, 1999.
- Introducing Black Theology of Liberation, 1999.
- Liberation Theologies, Post-Modernity, and the Americas, 1997; co-editor.
- Changing Conversations: Religious Reflection and Cultural Analysis, 1996; co-editor.
- Shoes That Fit our Feet: Sources for a Constructive Black Theology, 1993. Named an Outstanding Book on Human Rights by the Gustavus Myers Center for the Study of Human Rights in North America.
- We Are One Voice: Essays on Black Theology in South Africa and the USA, 1989; co-editor.
- Black Theology in the U.S.A. and South Africa: Politics, Culture, and Liberation, 1989.
