= Mary Catterall =

British doctor and sculptor

Mary Catterall FRCR, FACR (Hon)
- Born: Eileen Mary Williamson; 12 July 1922
- Died: 4 October 2015 (aged 93)
- Education: London Hospital Medical School

Mary Catterall (1922 – 2015) was a British medical doctor and sculptor.

== Early life ==
Mary Catterall was born in London to William Rowley Williamson and Anne Marguerite Wlliamson. Catterall attended St Helen's School in Middlesex. She worked as a despatch rider for the Home Guard from 1939 to 1941.

== Medical career ==
Catterall is recognised across the world for her pioneering work in neutron therapy. In 1943, she completed her initial training as a physiotherapist before deciding to re-train as a doctor. Having passed her first MB, Catterall was accepted at the London Hospital Medical School in an intake of 70 men and seven women. In 1959–1960, Catterall was a Research Fellow at the University of Leeds.

In the 1960s, Catterall gained international attention for her work at Hammersmith Hospital using an early 5 MeV cyclotron for neutron therapy treatment. She worked at Hammersmith Hospital until 1987, and wrote articles for medical journals during this period. In 1978, Catterall gave a guest lecture at the Fermi National Accelerator Laboratory in Illinois. By 1982, the Cyclotron Unit at Hammersmith Hospital was at risk of closure, and Catterall was offered a job in the United States of America.

Catterall was a member of the British Institute of Radiology and the Royal College of Radiologists, and a fellow of the American College of Radiology. In 1982, Catterall was awarded an honorary degree by Durham University as part of its 150th anniversary events.

== Sculpture ==
Catterall first began to model in clay during the Second World War. She later learned from the sculptor Humphrey Paget. Around 1968–1969, Catterall created a maquette in vinyl gel plaster for a memorial to John F. Kennedy, consisting of a group of figures representing Kennedy's interests including Medicare, race issues and underdeveloped countries.

Catterall was a member of the Chelsea Art Society. In 1998, Catterall sculpted a bust of John Ruskin to be exhibited in the Summer Exhibition at Holy Trinity, Sloane Street. The National Army Museum acquired five Bosnian sculptures by Catterall in 2008.

== Collections ==
Catterall's work is held in the following permanent public collections:

Title	Year	Medium	Gallery no.	Gallery	Location
Bust of Gen Sir Michael Rose, Commander UNPROFOR Bosnia, 1994	1994	bronze resin	2009-01-3	National Army Museum	London
Colonel Sir John Hunt (1910–1998)	—	bronze resin	WINGJ:2006.1531	The Royal Green Jackets (Rifles) Museum	Winchester, England
Dr Archibald E. Clark-Kennedy (1893–1985)	c.1980	bronze resin	RLHINV/896	The Royal London Hospital Museum	London
Dr Derek Vonberg (1922–2015)	1994	bronze resin	HH.1579	Imperial Health Charity Art Collection	London
First Meeting	1950	bronze resin	HH.1582	Imperial Health Charity Art Collection	London
'Frenzy', 'Peacekeepers', 'Broken' (triptych)	1994	bronze resin	2009-01-4	National Army Museum	London
Sculpture	1994	bronze resin	2009-01-5	National Army Museum	London
Trinitarian Madonna	—	—	—	Holy Trinity, Sloane Street	London

== Legacy ==
The annual Dr Mary Catterall Lecture is organised by the Cyclotron Trust for Cancer Treatment, and was first delivered in 2016.

Catterall established the charity Encouragement Through The Arts and Talking (ETAT), which "aims to relieve isolation and stimulate new ideas through participation in the arts."
