= Abidemi Sanusi =

Nigerian author

- Born: Lagos, Nigeria
- Education: Leeds University
- Occupation: Author
- Notable work: Eyo; Kemi's Journal; Zack's Story of Life, Love and Everything; God Has Daughters Too

Abidemi Sanusi is a Nigerian author.

== Biography ==
Abidemi Sanusi was born in Lagos, Nigeria. She had her Education in England, and attended Leeds University.

Sanusi worked as a human rights worker, and now manages a website for writers.

Kemi's Journal (2005) was her first work of fiction, followed by Zack's Story of Life, Love and Everything. God Has Daughters Too is a devotional book written about 10 women of the Old Testament. Her novel, Eyo, published by WordAlive Publishers was shortlisted for the 2010 Commonwealth Writers' Prize.

== Works published ==
- Eyo (2009)
- Kemi's Journal (2005)
- God Has Daughters Too (2006)
- Zack's Story of Life, Love and Everything (2006)
- Looking for Bono (Jacaranda Books, 2020)
