= J. Deotis Roberts =

American pioneer of black theology (1927–2022)

- Born: James Deotis Roberts; July 12, 1927; Spindale, North Carolina, U.S.
- Died: July 26, 2022 (aged 95)

Academic background
- Education: Johnson C. Smith University; Shaw University; Hartford Seminary; New College, Edinburgh
- Thesis: Rational Theology of Benjamin Whichcote: Father of the Cambridge Platonists (1957)

Academic work
- Discipline: Theology
- Sub-discipline: Philosophical theology
- School or tradition: Black theology; Baptist Christianity
- Institutions: Howard University; Eastern Baptist Theological Seminary
- Notable works: A Black Political Theology (1974)

James Deotis Roberts (July 12, 1927 – July 26, 2022) was an American theologian, and a pioneering figure in the black theology movement.

== Biography ==
Born in Spindale, Roberts earned a Bachelor of Arts degree from Johnson C. Smith University, a Bachelor of Divinity degree from Shaw University, and a Master of Sacred Theology degree from Hartford Seminary. In 1957, he became the first African American to earn a PhD from New College, University of Edinburgh, in philosophical theology. Later in 1994, he was awarded an honorary DLitt, also from the University of Edinburgh.

He taught at Howard University's School of Religion (1958–1980), served as president of the Interdenominational Theological Center from 1980 to 1983, and became Distinguished Professor of Philosophical Theology at Eastern Baptist Theological Seminary, serving there until 1998, after which he became a Distinguished Professor Emeritus. He was also the first and only black president of the American Theological Society (1994–1995).

Roberts became known for his work in black theology and the theology of Dietrich Bonhoeffer. A festschrift was prepared in his honor entitled The Quest for Liberation and Reconciliation (2005).

== Black theology ==
In the 1960s, Roberts and James H. Cone emerged as two leading figures in the black theology movement. Roberts challenged theologians such as Jürgen Moltmann as articulating theologies that were not relevant for black people in America. He also criticized the early works of Cone's, namely Black Theology and Black Power (1969), but also saw himself as mediating between Cone and Martin Luther King Jr.

== Personal life ==
Roberts was married to Elizabeth Caldwell Roberts and had four children, including the popular erotic fiction author known pseudonymously as Zane.

== Works ==
- Roberts, J. Deotis (2005). Bonhoeffer and King: Speaking Truth to Power. Westminster John Knox Press. ISBN 978-0-664-22652-7.
- ——— (2003). Goatley, David Emmanuel (ed.). Black Religion, Black Theology: The Collected Essays of J. Deotis Roberts. Trinity Press International. ISBN 978-1-56338-398-4.
- ——— (1994). The Prophethood of Black Believers: An African American Political Theology for Ministry. Westminster John Knox Press. ISBN 978-0-664-25488-9.
- ——— (1987). Black Theology in Dialogue. Westminster John Knox Press. ISBN 978-0-664-24022-6.
- ——— (1974). A Black Political Theology. Westminster John Knox Press. ISBN 978-0-664-22966-5.
- ——— (1971). Liberation and Reconciliation: A Black Theology. Westminster Press. ISBN 978-0-664-24911-3.
- ——— (1962). Faith and Reason: A Comparative Study of Pascal, Bergson, and James. Christopher Publishing House.
