= Joel Edwards (pastor) =

British writer and broadcaster (1951–2021)

Joel Nigel Patrick Edwards CBE (1951 – 30 June 2021) was a Jamaican-born British writer, broadcaster, consultant, international speaker on a range of areas including racial justice, leadership, religious freedom and bible teaching. He made history in 1997 when he became the first Black Pentecostal to become General Director of the United Kingdom's Evangelical Alliance from 1997 until 2009.

Prior to taking on this role, he was working as a probation officer alongside service as a church pastor at Mile End New Testament Church of God in London, and general secretary of the African & Caribbean Evangelical Alliance. He was Honorary Canon at St Paul's Cathedral.

== Work ==
In 2009 he became International Director for Micah Challenge a global Christian response to extreme poverty where he led the first global Christian response to corruption.

He was also a Commissioner of the Equality and Human Rights Commission. and served on the advisory board of Tony Blair's Faith Foundation.

He often presented on the BBC Radio 4 feature of The Today programme, Thought for the Day.

In 2015, Edwards was appointed Strategic Advisor at Christian Solidarity Worldwide (CSW) working with the Strategic Leadership Team, Board and staff to explore the relationship between the persecuted Church, freedom of religion or belief and wider human rights.

In 2016, he was awarded the Langton Award for Community Service by the Archbishop of Canterbury "for his unique contribution in uniting evangelical Christians across the UK in challenging global injustice". In the 2019 New Year Honours, Edwards was appointed Commander of the Order of the British Empire (CBE) for services to tackling poverty and injustice.

On the morning of 30 June 2021, his family confirmed his death from cancer via a letter Edwards had written:

Dear friends, This is to say a final goodbye. First, my incredible thanks for your prayers, love and holding on with me to that fingernail miracle. Words cannot express the depth, breadth and height of my gratitude, but I have gone home. My earnest prayer is that your faith and tenacity on my behalf will not be considered a pointless religious exercise, but that it will have strengthened your faith in a God who is marvellous, mysterious and majestic in all that He does: The Faithful One. I commend my family to you. I know you will watch over them in the months and years ahead. And I commend you to God and to the word of His grace that is able to build us up and give us an inheritance among those that are being saved. I wait to welcome you ...
