= Joel Waweru Mwangi =

Anglican Bishop of Nairobi, Kenya

Joel Waweru Mwangi has been the Anglican bishop of Bishop of Nairobi in the Province of Kenya since 2010:

Mwangi was born on 4 October 1959 at Gakira. He was educated at the high school in Kangema and the University of Nairobi. He joined the Church Army, rising to be Assistant General Secretary, Africa. He was ordained in 1994 and has served the church in Minnesota, Sheffield and Buruburu before his appointment as bishop.
