= Kairos Document =

1985 South African liberation theology position paper

The Kairos Document (KD) is a theological statement issued in 1985 by a group of mainly black South African theologians based predominantly in the townships of Soweto, South Africa. The document challenged the churches' response to what the authors saw as the vicious policies of the apartheid regime under the state of emergency declared on 21 July 1985. The KD evoked strong reactions and furious debates not only in South Africa, but world-wide.

The KD is a prime example of contextual theology and liberation theology - or "theology from below" - in South Africa, and has served as an example for attempted, similarly critical writing at decisive moments in several other countries and contexts (Latin America, Europe, Zimbabwe, India, Palestine, etc.).

== Context ==
The KD was predominantly written by an ecumenical group of pastors in Soweto, whose names have never (officially) been released to the public. Many believe it was a conscious decision to make the document anonymous, perhaps for security reasons since the Apartheid regime frequently harassed, detained, or tortured clergy who opposed the government. It is widely thought though that Frank Chikane, a black Pentecostal pastor and theologian, and Albert Nolan, a white Roman Catholic priest and member of the Dominican Order, belonged to this group. John W. de Gruchy writes decidedly that Frank Chikane, then General Secretary of the Institute for Contextual Theology (ICT) in Braamfontein, Johannesburg, initiated the process.

When this fairly short, 11,000-word document was first published in September 1985, it included over 150 signatures; it was subsequently signed by many more church leaders and theologians in South Africa, though the amended list was never published. A substantially revised, second edition appeared in 1986.

== Summary ==
The document is structured in five short chapters (the second edition comes to less than 40 pages): (1) The Moment of Truth; (2) Critique of 'State Theology'; (3) Critique of 'Church Theology'; (4) Towards a Prophetic Theology; (5) Challenge to Action; and a short conclusion. The following summary is based on the revised edition, and is designed to focus on the most important aspects of the KD, without comment.

=== Chapter One: The Moment of Truth ===
This chapter sets the context in which the KD is written. The time has come (September 1985) to act on the situation. The Greek term kairos / καιρος (meaning 'special moment' in this context) was chosen as a key term to describe the highly situational nature of this document. It was addressed to the churches in the context of South Africa at that very moment, and was meant to be understood as a process rather than a definitive statement, "... this was an open-ended document which will never be said to be final" (KD, Preface). The document is primarily addressed to the divided churches; divided, that is, due to the roles that Christians within the churches play in the conflict between the racist minority government and the black majority population. "Both oppressor and oppressed claim loyalty to the same church". The KD theologians see three broad theological positions within the church, which are discussed in turn in the next three chapters.

=== Chapter Two: Critique of State Theology ===
'State theology' is defined as, "the theological justification of the status quo with its racism, capitalism and totalitarianism... It does [this] by misusing theological concepts and biblical texts for its own political purposes". The government, as well as parts of the church, are accused of using state theology. Four examples are discussed.

==== Romans 13:1-7 ====
"'State Theology' assumes that in this text Paul is presenting us with the absolute and definitive Christian doctrine about the State ... and absolute and universal principle ... The falseness of this assumption has been pointed out by many biblical scholars". Reference is made to Käsemann's Commentary on Romans, as well as Cullmann's The State in the New Testament.

The KD authors insist that texts must be understood in their context: within a particular writing (here: Romans); within the Bible as a whole; and within the particular historical context (here: Paul and the community in Rome). Note that, "In the rest of the Bible, God does not demand obedience to oppressive rulers ... Romans 13:1–7 cannot contradict all of this".

The letter known as the Biblical book Romans was sent to an early Christian community in Rome that could be characterized as 'antinomian' or 'enthusiast.' Roman Christians thought that "because Jesus ... was their Lord and King," every authority should be obeyed. Paul was arguing against such an understanding; that is, he is "not addressing the issue of a just or unjust State." Attention is drawn to Romans 13:4 ("the State is there for your benefit"): "That is the kind of State that must be obeyed." The question of an unjust government is not addressed in Romans 13 but, for example, in Revelation 13.

==== Law and Order ====
State theology implies that law and order must be upheld, but in the Apartheid State, the KD authors contend, this is an unjust law and order. "Anyone who wishes to change this law ... is made ... to feel guilty of sin". The KD theologians argue that the State has no divine authority to maintain any sort of law and order. The appeal to law and order is misplaced. Ultimately, it is God who must be obeyed (Acts 5:29).

State theology further justifies the State's use of violence to maintain the status quo. Thus "state security becomes a more important concern than justice ... The State often admonishes church leaders ... not to 'meddle in politics' while at the same time it indulges in its own political theology which claims God's approval for its use of violence in maintaining an unjust system of 'law and order'".

==== The Threat of Communism ====
"Anything that threatens the status quo is labeled 'communist'... No account is taken of what communism really means ... Even people who have not rejected capitalism are called 'communists' when they reject 'State Theology.' The State uses the label ... as its symbol of evil". The State uses "threats and warnings about the horrors of a tyrannical, totalitarian, atheistic and terrorist communist regime" simply to scare people.

==== The God of the State ====
The Apartheid State often makes explicit use of the name of God to justify its own existence, most explicitly in the preamble to the (1983) Constitution of South Africa: "In humble submission to almighty God ... who gathered our forebears together from many lands and gave them this their own; who has guided them from generation to generation ..."

The KD theologians reject this categorically: "This god [of the State] is an idol ... [it is] the god of teargas, rubber bullets, sjamboks, prison cells and death sentences." In other words, "the very opposite of the God of the Bible", which is, theologically speaking "the devil disguised as Almighty God." Therefore, "State Theology is not only heretical, it is blasphemous ... What is particularly tragic for a Christian is to see the number of people who are fooled and confused by these false prophets and their heretical theology."

=== Chapter Three: Critique of 'Church Theology' ===
'Church Theology' is defined as the kind of theology shown by public pronouncements of many church leaders in the so-called English speaking churches of South Africa, such as Anglicans, Methodists, and Lutherans. While such a theology tends to reject apartheid in principle, the KD theologians regard it as counter-productive and superficial as they do not analyze "the signs of our times [but rather rely] upon a few stock ideas derived from Christian tradition," which is uncritically 'applied' to the then South African context.

==== Reconciliation ====
While true reconciliation and peace are the core of the Christian tradition, true reconciliation, the KD authors argue, is not possible without justice. Calls for reconciliation without justice are calls for "counterfeit reconciliation".

Such false reconciliation relies on the notion that the church must stand between 'both sides' and 'get them to reconcile,' as if all conflicts were the same: some struggles are about justice and injustice, where blindly calling for reconciliation is "unChristian." Therefore, "no reconciliation, no forgiveness and no negotiations are possible without repentance". Yet, the imposition of the brutal State of Emergency in July 1985 shows that there is no repentance.

==== Justice ====
The KD theologians acknowledge that the concept of justice is not absent from much Church Theology. Yet the KD accuses Church Theology of advocating a "justice of reforms," a justice of concessions that is determined by the oppressor. Hence "almost all Church statements are made to the State or to the white community".

At the heart of this approach, the KD sees the reliance on individual conversion as a moralizing approach directed at the individual Christian. Yet "the problem ... in South Africa is not merely a problem of personal guilt, it is a problem of structural injustice." The question one has to ask is: "Why does this [Church] theology not demand that the oppressed stand up for their rights and wage a struggle against their oppressors? Why does it not tell them that it is 'their' duty to work for justice and to change the unjust structures"?

==== Non-Violence ====
The KD questions the blanket condemnation of all "that is called violence," which "has been made into an absolute principle." This aspect of Church Theology tends to exclude state-organized, "structural, institutional and unrepentant violence of the State." Indeed, "is it legitimate ... to use the same word violence in a blanket condemnation to cover" the violence of the state and the "desperate attempts of the people to defend themselves"?

The KD observes that the term violence is used in the Bible to denote the violence of the oppressor (e.g. Psalms 72, Isaiah 59 etc.). "When Jesus says that we should turn the other cheek he is telling us that we must not take revenge; he is not saying that we should never defend ourselves or others".

"This is not to say that any use of force at any time by people who are oppressed is permissible..."; the problem with such acts of "killing and maiming" is, however, "based upon a concern for genuine liberation". While Church Theology tends to decry violent resistance, it tends to accept the militarization of the Apartheid State, which implies a tacit acceptance of the racist regime as legitimate authority.

Neutrality, in this context, is not possible: "Neutrality enables the status quo of oppression (and therefore violence) to continue".

==== The fundamental problem ====
According to the KD, Church Theology lacks appropriate social analysis: "It is not possible to make valid moral judgments about a society without first understanding that society". Secondly, it lacks "an adequate understanding of politics and political strategy," not because there is a "specifically Christian solution" as such, but because Christians need to make use of politics. The reasons for this are seen in the "type of faith and spirituality that has dominated Church life for centuries," namely an approach that has regarded spirituality as an "other-worldly affair," wherein God was relied upon to intervene "in God's own good time." Yet such a faith has "no foundation" in the Bible, which shows how God redeems all of creation (Romans 8:18-24): "Biblical faith is prophetically relevant to everything that happens in the world".

=== Chapter Four: Towards a Prophetic Theology ===
What would the alternative to State and Church Theology be? "What would be the characteristics of a prophetic theology"?

==== Prophetic Theology ====
In the first place, prophetic theology will have to be biblical: "Our KAIROS impels us to return to the Bible, and to search the Word of God for a message that is relevant to what we are experiencing in South Africa today". It does not "pretend to be comprehensive and complete;" it is consciously devised for this situation, and therefore needs to take seriously the need to read the "signs of the times" (Matthew 16:3). It is always a call to action, a call for "repentance, conversion and change". This will involve confrontation, taking a stand, and persecution. It is, nevertheless, fundamentally a "message of hope." It is spiritual: "Infused with a spirit of fearless[ness] ... courage ... love ... understanding ... joy and hope".

==== Suffering and oppression in the Bible ====
Reading the bible in this context "what stands out for us is (sic) the many, many vivid and concrete descriptions of suffering and oppression" from Exodus to Revelation. Israel was often oppressed by both external and internal forces. "Their oppressors were their enemies. The people of Israel were in no doubt about that". Indeed, "people of the townships can identify fully with these descriptions of suffering". Nor is the concern about oppression only found in the Old Testament, even though the New Testament tends to focus on internal repression rather than the Roman occupying forces. "Throughout his life Jesus associated himself with the poor and the oppressed and as the suffering (or oppressed) servant of Yahweh he suffered and died for us. 'Ours were the sufferings he bore, ours the sorrows he carried.' (Isaiah 53:4) He continues to do so, even today".

==== Social Analysis ====
The KD offers "the broad outlines of an analysis of the conflict in which we find ourselves". This conflict is seen not so much as a 'racial war' but rather a situation "of tyranny and oppression". This is expressed in social structures which "will sooner or later bring the people involved into conflict." Those who benefit from this system will only make reform possible in order to maintain the essential status quo. On the other hand, those who do not benefit from the system have no say in it. The situation now is one where the oppressed are no longer prepared to accept this. "What they want is justice for all...".

Of course this social structure is more complex, but the KD authors come to this distinction: "Either we have full and equal justice for all or we don't". Prophetic theology, like Jesus', addresses this situation (e.g. Matthew 6:24). "It is therefore not primarily a matter of trying to reconcile individual people but a matter of trying to change unjust structures so that people will not be pitted against one another as oppressor and oppressed".

==== Tyranny ====
In terms of the Christian tradition, the KD maintain, a tyrannical government has no moral right to govern, "and the people acquire the right to resist". The South African Apartheid government is tyrannical because it consistently demonstrates its hostility to the common good as a matter of principle. As a tyrannical regime, it uses terror to maintain power. As a result, the oppressed refer to it as 'the enemy'.

The Apartheid State is not capable of true reform; any reforms will have to be facile only since they are designed to ensure the survival of the white minority government. "A regime that has made itself the enemy of the people has thereby also made itself the enemy of God," even though at the level of the individual, people in government are not aware of this. This is, however, "no excuse for hatred. As Christians we are called upon to love our enemies" (Mt 5:44). However, "the most loving thing we can do for both the oppressed and for our enemies who are oppressors is to eliminate the oppression, remove the tyrants from power, and establish a just government for the common good for all the people".

==== Liberation and hope in the Bible ====
The Bible is commonly understood as a message of hope in the face of oppression; Yahweh will liberate the people (e.g. Psalms 74, Exodus 3, Psalms 12). "Throughout the Bible, God appears as the liberator ... God is not neutral. He does not attempt to reconcile Moses and Pharaoh ...". Neither is Jesus "unconcerned about the rich ... These he calls to repentance ... We believe that God is at work in our world turning hopeless and evil situations to good so that God's Kingdom may come and God's Will may be done on earth as it is in heaven".

==== A message of hope ====
"The people need to hear it said again and again that God is with them and that 'the hope of the poor is never brought to nothing'" (Psalms 9:18). Also, while the oppressors must be called to repentance, "they must also be given something to hope for. At present they have false hopes ... Can the Christian message of hope not help them in this matter"?

=== Chapter Five: Challenge to Action ===
==== God sides with the oppressed ====
The Church's call to action must consider that the struggle against Apartheid is generally waged by the poor and oppressed, who are part of the church already.

Church unity is a matter of joining in the struggle. "For those Christians who find themselves on the side of the oppressor or sitting on the fence, [the way forward is] to cross over to the other side to be united in faith and action". Liberation, however should be noted that it does not come on a silver platter.

==== Participation in the struggle ====
"Criticism [of the way the struggle is being waged] will sometimes be necessary but encouragement and support will be (sic) also be necessary. In other words, ... move beyond a mere 'ambulance ministry' to a ministry of involvement and participation".

==== Transforming church action ====
The traditional life, ritual, and actions of the church must be re-envisaged in the light of the kairos. "The repentance we preach must be named. It is repentance for our share of the guilt for the suffering and oppression in our country".

==== Special campaigns ====
Special church action and campaigns must be in "consultation, co-ordination and co-operation" with the people's political organization, rather than a 'new, third force' that duplicates what already exists.

==== Civil disobedience ====
"In the first place, the Church cannot collaborate with tyranny... Secondly, the Church should not only pray for a change of government, it should also mobilize its members in every parish to begin to think and work and plan for a change of government in South Africa". At times, the KD contends, this will mean getting involved in civil disobedience.

==== Moral guidance ====
People look to the church for moral guidance, and this position of influence must be taken seriously. "There must be no misunderstanding about the moral duty of all who are oppressed to resist oppression and to struggle for liberation and justice. The Church will also find that at times it does need to curb excesses and to appeal to the consciences of those who act thoughtlessly and wildly".

=== Conclusion ===
"As we said in the beginning, there is nothing final about this document nor even about this second edition. Our hope is that it will continue to stimulate discussion, debate, reflection and prayer, but, above all, that it will lead to action ... We pray that God will help all of us to translate the challenge of our times into action."

== Reactions ==
Although the Apartheid State was not directly addressed in the KD, the government reacted strongly against it. A government spokesperson rejected it in a speech in Parliament, denouncing it as a call for violence, and calling for its prohibition ('banning') by the government. An Inkatha political magazine, the Clarion Call, similarly attacked it as a theological document that supported the 'violence of the ANC' (African National Congress). However, to the surprise of many observers at the time, the KD was never banned by the Apartheid government.

Within the churches in South Africa, and indeed worldwide, the KD led to intense and often heated debates. The unpolished nature of this radical document allowed many critics to disengage from real debate. For example, Markus Barth and Helmut Blanke make a rather brief, disparaging remark, which seems to be based on a reading of the KD that is significantly at variance with its substance. In the KD, Barth and Blanke claim, "it is the starved, exploited, oppressed people whose cause, as it were, by definition is righteous, while all political, economical, and ecclesiastical wielders of institutionalized power are depicted as instruments of the devil."

A crucial part of the debate was the distinction made between state, church, and prophetic theology. The distinction between 'church' and 'prophetic' theology, where the former was explicitly rejected by the KD, caused furious debates. Many argued the KD's qualified criticism of central theological concepts like reconciliation.

Another aspect of this debate, especially in South Africa, was the question of violence: not the violence of the state, but the supposed use of violence to resist and indeed overthrow the state. As the summary above shows, this was not a central part of the KD, but it nevertheless became a focus for the debate. This focus on violence soon came to eclipse much of the rest of the KD. The publication of the book Theology & Violenceis testimony to that debate; it attempted both to ground it in biblical, historical, ethical and theological reflections, and to 'move on', as Frank Chikane in his contribution to that book called it.

The influence and effect of the KD was such that attempts were made in a number of contexts to create similarly 'revolutionary' documents to challenge the churches' attitude to particular issues. None of these were remotely as successful as the KD. For example, in South Africa again, a group in the ICT attempted to address the sharply rising and complex violence in 1990 with a 'new Kairos document'. Several years later, some theologians in Europe tried to address global economics as 'the new Kairos'. Perhaps the most successful attempt to follow in the footsteps of the KD was the 'Latin American KD', called The Road to Damascus, written by Central American theologians and published in April 1988. However, the KD was successful in influencing black evangelicals and Pentecostals to come up with their own declarations in the context of Apartheid.

== See also ==
- Kairos Palestine
