= Eyo (novel) =

2009 novel by Abidemi Sanusi

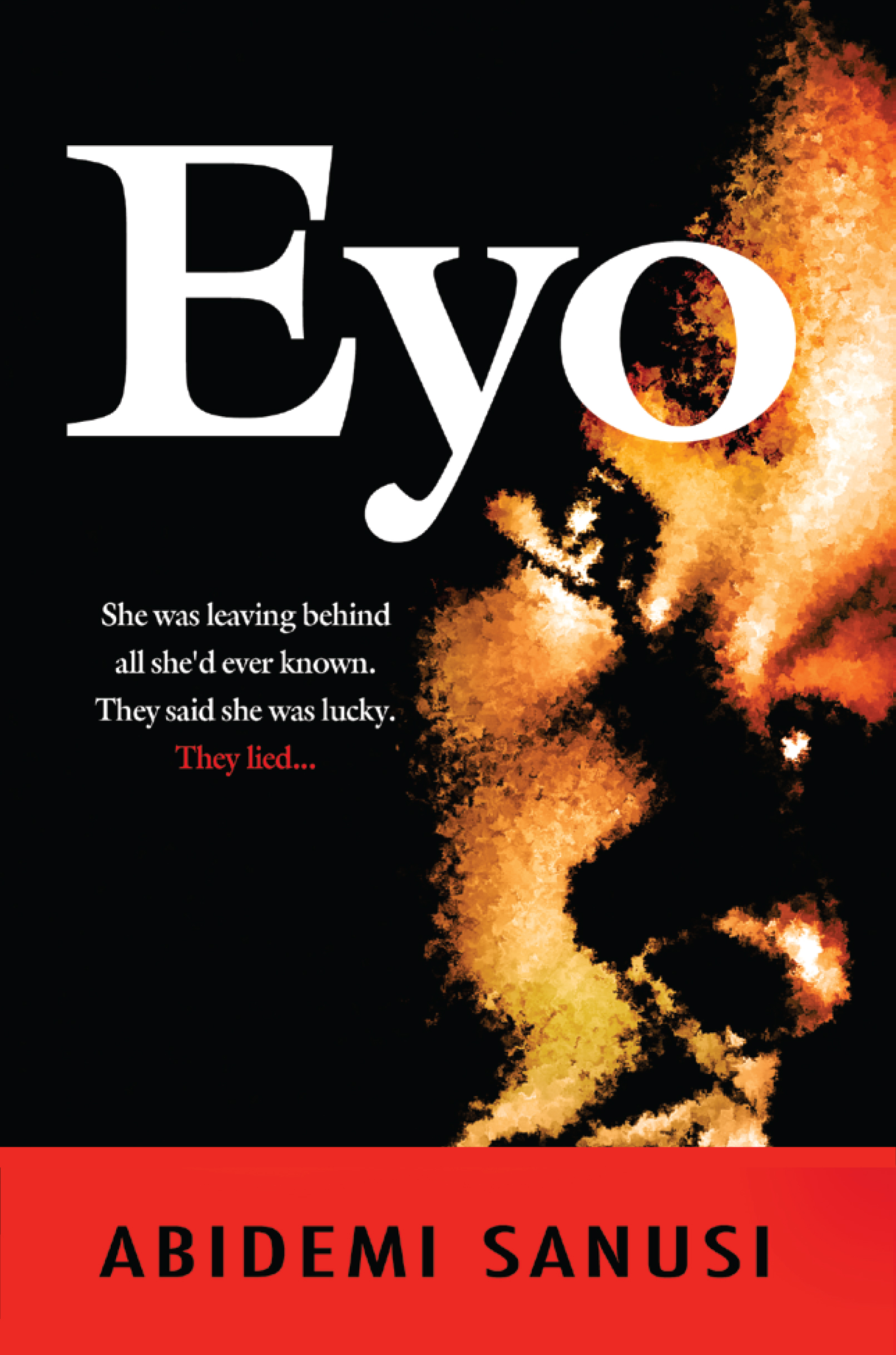
- First Edition Cover
- Author: Abidemi Sanusi
- Language: English
- Publisher: WordAlive Publishers
- Publication date: 2009
- Publication place: Nigeria
- Media type: Print (Paperback)
- Pages: 346 pp
- ISBN: 978-9966-805-26-3

Eyo is a 2009 eponymous novel written by Nigerian author, Abidemi Sanusi DND published by WordAlive Publishers. The novel explores the theme opposing child trafficking and sex slavery using children who are trafficked to Europe. Eyo was shortlisted for the Commonwealth Writers' Prize in 2010.

== Synopsis ==
Eyo, an illiterate 10-year-old girl was trafficked to the United Kingdom by her father with promises of a better life. Eventually, her five-year stay was as a domestic servant and eventually, a child sex slave. Before coming to overseas, Eyo lived in Lagos State, Nigeria, and after she had moved abroad, she became a worker with much beats and hard threats. She is an illiterate, illegal immigrant with no family, friends, or means of escape.

Atlas, Eyo is rescued from by a Roman Catholic priest and nun who sent her back to Nigeria intending to rebuild her life. However, she faced more problem even after gaining freedom.
