= Society of Christian Ethics =

Academic society

- Abbreviation: SCE
- Formation: 1959; 67 years ago
- Type: Learned society
- Field: Christian ethics
- Members: Approx. 850
- President: Rebecca Todd Peters
- Affiliations: Council of Societies for the Study of Religion
- Website: scethics.org/home
- Formerly called: American Society of Christian Social Ethics; American Society of Christian Ethics

The Society of Christian Ethics (SCE) is a non-denominational academic society that promote scholarly work in Christian ethics and the relation of Christian ethics to other ethics traditions. Its members are faculty and students at universities, colleges, and theological schools primarily in the United States, Canada, and Europe.

Founded as the American Society of Christian Social Ethics in 1959, the society changed its name to the American Society of Christian Ethics in c. 1964 before adopting its current name in 1980.

The SCE sponsors an annual meeting in conjunction with the Society of Jewish Ethics and the Society for the Study of Muslim Ethics. Some papers from these meetings are published in the Journal of the Society of Christian Ethics.

Emilie M. Townes, the E. Rhodes and Leona B. Carpenter Chair in Ethics and Society at Vanderbilt University, was President of the SCE 2024-25.

== Presidents ==
Year of Term	President	Presidential Address
2025	Rebecca Todd Peters	"Re-imagining the Work of Christian Ethics in the 21st Century"
2024	Emilie M. Townes	"Shadowboxing the Ridiculous"
2023	D. Stephen Long	"Making a Living by Teaching and Learning Christian Ethics"
2022	Bryan N. Massingale	"Dreaming while Black: King, Imagination, and the Work of Ethics"
2021	James F. Keenan, SJ	"Social Trust and the Ethics of Our Institutions"
2020	Jennifer A. Herdt	"Of Wild Beasts and Bloodhounds: John Locke and Frederick Douglass on the Forfeiture of Humanity"
2019	Patricia Beattie Jung	"Celebrate Suffrage"
2018	Diane M. Yeager	"A Quality of Wonder: Five Thoughts on a Poetics of the Will"
2017	David Gushee	"Christian Ethics: Retrospect and Prospect"
2016	Cristina Traina	"'This Is the Year': Narratives of Structural Evil"
2015	William Schweiker	"Humanity and the Global Future"
2014	M. Cathleen Kaveny	"Law and Christian Ethics: Signposts for a Fruitful Conversation"
2013	Allen Verhey	"Should Jesus Get Tenure? Jesus as a Moral Teacher and the Vocation of Teaching Christian Ethics" (prepared in advance but not delivered in person due to illness)
2012	Miguel De La Torre	"Doing Latina/o Ethics from the Margins of Empire: Liberating the Colonized Mind"
2011	Stanley Hauerwas	"Bearing Reality: A Christian Meditation"
2010	Douglas F. Ottati	"How Can Theological Ethics Be Christian?"
2009	Daniel K. Finn	"The Promise of Interdisciplinary Engagement: Christian Ethics and Economics as a Test Case"
2008	Darryl M. Trimiew	"Political Messiahs or Political Pariahs? The Problem of Moral Leadership in the Twenty-first Century"
2007	Christine E. Gudorf	"Heroes, Suicides, and Moral Discernment"
2006		
2005	Jean Porter	"Christian Ethics and the Concept of Morality: A Historical Inquiry"
2004	John Langan	"Hope in and for the United States of America"
2003	June O'Connor	"Ethics in Popular Culture"
2002	William F. May	"The Shift in Political Anxieties in the West: From 'The Russians Are Coming' to 'The Coming Anarchy'"
2001	Gene Outka	"Theocentric Love and the Augustinian Legacy: Honoring Differences and Likenesses between God and Ourselves"
2000	Harlan Beckley	"Moral Justifications for the Welfare State"
1999	Robin W. Lovin	"Christian Realism: A Legacy and Its Future"
1998	Ronald M. Green	"Jewish and Christian Ethics: What Can We Learn from One Another?"
1997	Lisa Sowle Cahill	"Community Versus Universals: A Misplaced Debate in Christian Ethics"
1996	Charles H. Reynolds	"Text, Argument and Society: Remembering and Anticipating Our Collegial Identity"
1995	David Hollenbach	"Social Ethics under the Sign of the Cross"
1994	Jon P. Gunnemann	"Alchemic Temptations"
1993	Margaret A. Farley	"How Shall We Love in a Postmodern World?"
1992	Joseph L. Allen	"Power and Political Community"
1991	Peter J. Paris	"The Search For a Common Moral Discourse Among African Peoples"
1990	Larry L. Rasmussen	"Power Analysis: A Neglected Agenda in Christian Ethics"
1989	Karen Lebacqz	"Love Your Enemy: Sex, Power, and Christian Ethics"
1988	Theodore R. Weber	"Truth and Political Leadership"
1987	John Howard Yoder	"To Serve Our God and to Rule the World"
1986	Max L. Stackhouse	"Christian Social Ethics as a Vocation"
1985	Major J. Jones	"Ethical Criteria, Principles, and Guidelines for One's Stance Against Evil"
1984	Alan Geyer	"Politics and the Ethics of History"
1983	Thomas Ogletree	"The Ecclesial Context of Christian Ethics"
1982	Beverly Wildung Harrison	"The Dream Of A Common Language: Towards A Normative Theory of Justice In Christian Ethics"
1981	Daniel C. Maguire	"The Feminization of God and Ethics"
1980	Douglas Sturm	"The Prism of Justice: E Pluribus Unum?"
1979	Donald W. Shriver Jr.	"The Pain and Promise of Pluralism"
1978	Walter G. Muelder	"The Science of Limits and the Limits of Science"
1977	Waldo Beach	" The Old and the New in Christian Ethics"
1976	J. Philip Wogaman	"The Integrity Of Christian Ethics"
1975	Preston N. Williams	
1974	Roger L. Shinn	"The Style of Christian Polemics"
1973	Charles C. West	
1972	Edward L. Long Jr.	
1971	Charles Curran	
1970	John H. Satterwhite	
1969	James Gustafson	
1968	James Luther Adams	
1967	Murray Leiffer	
1966	Victor Obenhaus	
1965	Paul Elmen	
1964	Prentiss L. Pemberton	
1963	Walter W. Sikes	
1962	Paul Ramsey	
1961	E. Clinton Gardner	
1960	John C. Bennett	"Ethical Principles and the Context"
1959	Henry E. Kolbe	(no annual meeting)

== Executive secretaries / Executive directors ==
- 1959–1963: Das Kelley Barnett
- 1964–1967: E. Clinton Gardner
- 1968–1971: Douglas Sturm
- 1972–1975: Franklin Sherman
- 1976–1979: Max L. Stackhouse
- 1980–1983: Joseph L. Allen
