= Beverly Wildung Harrison =

American feminist theologian (1932–2012)

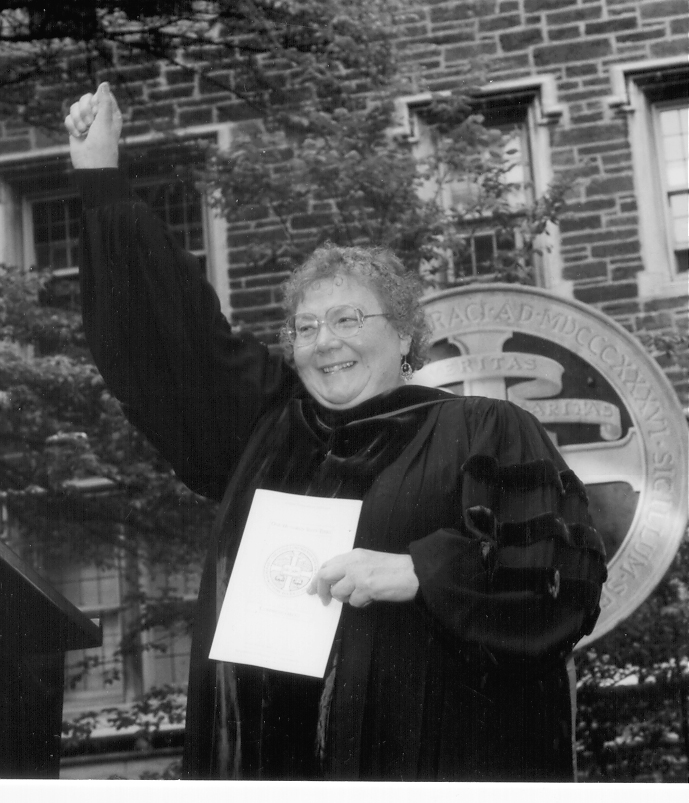
- Born: Beverly Jean Wildung; August 4, 1932; Saint Paul, Minnesota, US
- Died: December 15, 2012 (aged 80); North Carolina, US
- Other name: Beverly Jean Wildung Harrison
- Partner: Carter Heyward

Academic background
- Education: Macalester College; Union Theological Seminary
- Thesis: H. Richard Niebuhr: Towards a Christian Moral Philosophy (1974)
- Influences: James Luther Adams; John Bennett; Tom F. Driver; Karl Marx; Robert McAfee Brown; Carter Heyward; Reinhold Niebuhr; Rosemary Radford Ruether; Roger L. Shinn; Dorothee Sölle; Delores S. Williams

Academic work
- Discipline: Theology
- Sub-discipline: Christian ethics
- School or tradition: Christian feminism; liberation theology
- Institutions: Union Theological Seminary
- Doctoral students: Rebecca Todd Peters
- Notable students: Katie Cannon
- Influenced: Jacquelyn Grant; Ada Maria Isasi-Diaz; Delores S. Williams

Beverly Jean Wildung Harrison (1932–2012) was an American Presbyterian feminist theologian whose work was foundational for the field of feminist Christian ethics. She taught at Union Theological Seminary in New York City for 32 years.

== Early life and education ==
Beverly Jean Wildung was born in Saint Paul, Minnesota, on August 4, 1932. Her parents, Harold Wildung and Adahlia Knodt Wildung, were both Presbyterians and they had four children, Beverly was the youngest. She attended Macalester College where she studied with Robert McAfee Brown. After graduating in 1954, she continued her education at Union Theological Seminary in New York City, where she earned a Master of Religious Education degree and her Doctor of Philosophy degree in 1975.

== Career ==
After serving as an assistant campus chaplain at the University of California, Berkeley, in the 1960s, she returned to Union Theological Seminary in 1966 to join the faculty as an instructor. She received tenure in 1980 and became the Caroline Williams Beaird Professor of Christian Ethics in 1986.

While at Union, she authored and co-authored several influential works on feminist Christian ethics. Her lectures on "The Power of Anger in the Work of Love" and "The Role of Social Theory in Religious Ethics" were distributed widely among students and faculty, before being added to a published collection of essays, called Making the Connections: Essays in Feminist Social Ethics (1985), which has been called "one of the best books ever published in feminist religious thought."

Her first published book Our Right to Choose: Toward a New Ethic of Abortion (1983), was a significant contribution to the discussion of moral issues surrounding the abortion debate. She was also a co-author and editor of God's Fierce Whimsy: Christian Feminism and Theological Education (1985), a collection of articles by Christian feminists of diverse backgrounds, published by the Mudflower Collective. By highlighting the perspectives of women of color and lesbians, God's Fierce Whimsy helped challenge the traditional canon and methodologies of Christian theological education.

In the 1970s, Harrison co-founded the Feminist Ethics Consultation of the Northeast, a mentoring organization for women in ethics. In 1982, she became the first woman to be elected president of the Society of Christian Ethics. She retired in 1999.

Harrison died on December 15, 2012, in North Carolina.

== Awards ==
Harrison was granted the lifetime achievement award from the Society of Christian Ethics in 2012, but it was awarded posthumously at the annual meeting in 2013.

== Works ==
- Our Right to Choose: Toward a New Ethic of Abortion (1983)
- Making the Connections: Essays in Feminist Social Ethics (1985)
- God's Fierce Whimsy: Christian Feminism and Theological Education (co-author, editor) (1985)
- The Public Vocation of Christian Ethics (co-editor) (1986)
- Justice in the Making: Feminist Social Ethics (2004)
