= Siebrecht =

Siebrecht is a German surname. Notable people with the surname include:

- Gloria Jean Siebrecht (born 1940), American paleontologist
- Henry Augustus Siebrecht (1849–1934), German-American horticulturalist
- Sebastian Siebrecht (born 1973), German chess grandmaster
