= Beverly Harrison =

Beverly Harrison may refer to:

- Beverly Wildung Harrison (1932–2012), American feminist theologian
- Bev Harrison (Beverly John Harrison, born 1942), teacher and New Brunswick politician
