= Marcia Y. Riggs =

American author

- Occupations: J. Erskine Love Professor of Christian Ethics and the Director of ThM Program
- Awards: Distinction in Theological Education Award, Yale Divinity School

Academic background
- Education: Randolph-Macon Woman's College, BA '80; Yale Divinity School, MDiv '83; Vanderbilt University, PhD '91
- Thesis: Toward a mediating ethic for black liberation: Ethical insights of black female reformers of the nineteenth century (1991)

Academic work
- Discipline: Womanist theologian and authority on the black woman’s club movement
- Notable works: Plenty Good Room: Women Versus Male Power in the Black Church

Marcia Y. Riggs is an American author, the J. Erskine Love Professor of Christian Ethics, and the Director of ThM Program at Columbia Theological Seminary, a womanist theologian, and a recognized authority on the black woman's club movement of the nineteenth century. She was one of six Luce Scholars named by the Association of Theological Schools in the United States and Canada (ATS) and The Henry Luce Foundation, Inc. as Henry Luce III Fellows in Theology for 2017–2018.

== Education ==
Riggs graduated cum laude from Randolph-Macon Woman's College, Lynchburg, Virginia, in 1980 with a Bachelor of Arts degree in Religion. She then proceeded with her education to Yale Divinity School, New Haven, Connecticut, where she graduated with a Master of Divinity degree in 1983. In 1991, she earned her Doctor of Philosophy in Religion (Ethics) from Vanderbilt University, Nashville, TN.

== Career ==
Riggs began working at Vanderbilt University as a teaching assistant in 1985 and later a teaching fellow. She soon moved to Drew University Theological School-Madison in New Jersey, where she fulfilled the position of Instructor and Assistant Professor of Religion and Society. She has also taught at Pacific School of Religion in Berkeley, California, in 1995, and Lutheran School of Theology at Chicago in 2005–2006. At the Lutheran School of Theology at Chicago she was a Co-Teacher and ACTS Doctor of Ministry in Preaching. At Columbia Theological Seminary she is the J. Erskine Love Professor of Christian Ethics and also holds the position of Director of the ThM Program. She has also worked outside of academics as an Associate Minister at Hemphill African Methodist Episcopal Zion Church in Summerville, Georgia, and is an ordained minister in the AME Zion tradition.

Riggs is the President and Founder of Still Waters: A Center for Ethical Formation and Practices, Inc., a Not-for-Profit Educational Organization in Stone Mountain, Georgia. She is also the Chair of the North American Doctoral Fellows Selection Committee for Fund for Theological Education, as well as previously the Chair of Womanist Approaches to Religion and Society Group for American Academy of Religion.

Riggs has developed an ethical theory and practice called "religious ethical mediation". Religious ethical mediation prepares leaders to address religion, conflict, and violence in a transformative manner.

Riggs is the author of several books, including Plenty Good Room: Women Versus Male Power in the Black Church (Cleveland, Ohio: The Pilgrim Press, 2003), which has been listed as one of 40 essential books that are foundational for understanding the Black Church. She has also published numerous scholarly articles and lectures.

Riggs has served on the editorial boards for the Encyclopedia on Women and Religion in North America, the Journal of the Society of Christian Ethics, and the Feasting on the Word Lectionary Commentary Series.

Riggs was selected as a Henry Luce III Fellow in Theology for the academic year 2017–2018. The annual fellowship is given to theologians, scholars or religious leaders in the United States and Canada whose work contributes to "significant and innovative contributions to theological studies".

She received the Distinction in Theological Education Award from Yale Divinity School in 2012.

== Books ==
- Awake, Arise, & Act: A Womanist Call for Black Liberation (Cleveland, OH: The Pilgrim Press, 1994)
- Can I Get a Witness? Prophetic Religious Voices of African American Women, An Anthology (Maryknoll, NY: Orbis Books, 1997), editor
- Plenty Good Room: Women Versus Male Power in the Black Church (Cleveland, OH: The Pilgrim Press, 2003)
- Ethics That Matters: African, Caribbean, and African American Sources (Minneapolis, MN: Fortress Press, 2011), co-edited with James Logan

== Awards ==
- 2006: Alumnae Achievement Award, Randolph College
- 2012: Distinction in Theological Education Award, Yale Divinity School
- 2017–2018: Luce Fellow, Association of Theological Schools in the United States and Canada
