= Bad Berka =

Place in Thuringia, Germany

- Town
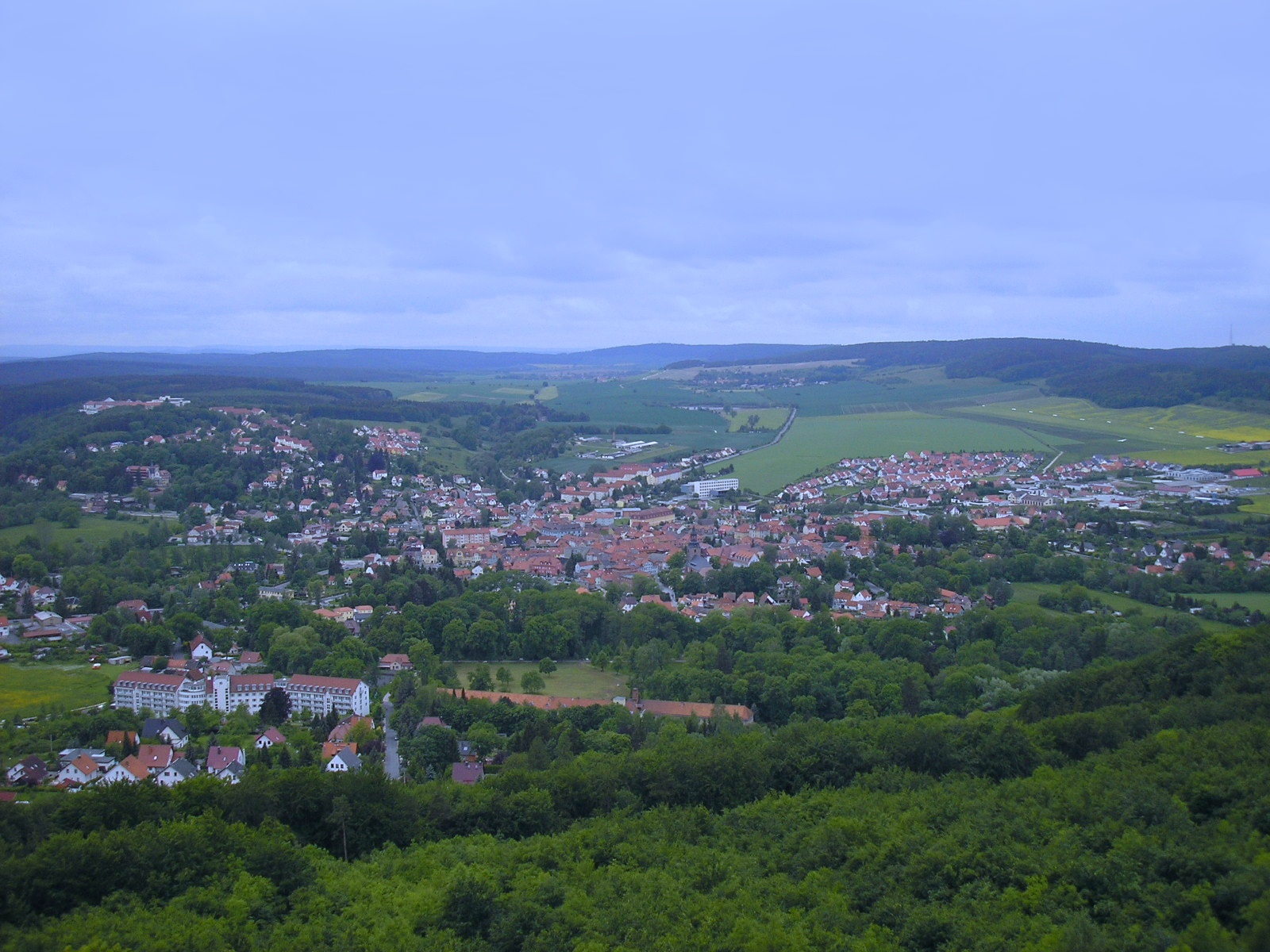

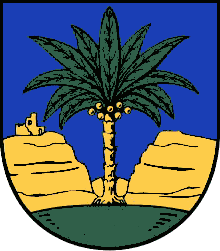
- Coat of arms

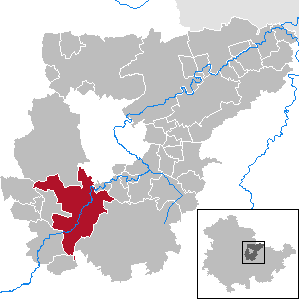
- Location of Bad Berka within Weimarer Land district
- Interactive map of Bad Berka
- Location within Germany Location within Thuringia
- Coordinates: 50°54′0″N 11°16′51″E
- Country: Germany
- State: Thuringia
- District: Weimarer Land
- Subdivisions: 9 Stadtteile

Government
  - Mayor (2024–30): Michael Jahn (CDU)

Area
  - Total: 55.32 km^{2} (21.36 sq mi)
- Elevation: 275 m (902 ft)

Population (2025-12-31)
  - Total: 7,389
  - Density: 133.6/km^{2} (345.9/sq mi)
- Time zone: UTC+01:00 (CET)
  - Summer (DST): UTC+02:00 (CEST)
- Postal codes: 99438
- Dialling codes: 036458
- Vehicle registration: AP
- Website: www.bad-berka.de

Bad Berka (German: [baːt ˈbɛʁka]) is a German spa town, situated in the south of Weimar region in the state of Thuringia. With its almost 8,000 inhabitants Bad Berka is the second biggest city in Weimarer Land district (after Apolda, 23,000). The river flowing through the town, which is embedded in new red sandstone, is called Ilm. Since 1 December 2008, the city has incorporated the former municipality of Gutendorf.

Bad Berka is a spa town with an iron-rich spring and Kneipp facilities. In 2002 the award of "State Recognised Spa with Mineral Spring Health Facility" was given to the city. In order to treat tuberculosis, a clinic was erected in 1952. This was the beginning of the main economic sector of the city. Bad Berka's Zentralklinik has since gained a reputation as a center of medicinal expertise far beyond the boundaries of Germany. Its foundation can be traced back to 1898. In addition, there was a rehabilitation clinic built after the fall of the Berlin Wall. The "Median-Klinik" consists of two buildings, which were opened in 1994 and 1997.

Because of its proximity to the cultural capital Weimar and association with numerous historical figures, Bad Berka is also popular among tourists. Between 1812 and 1828 Goethe visited his friend Heinrich Friedrich Schütz several times. He was also involved in the plans of the spa. Therefore, Bad Barka is called "Das Goethebad im Grünen" (Goethe spa in greenery), as well. Bad Berka is surrounded by spruce and beech forest.

Other bigger cities in the vicinity are Jena (20 km (12 mi) north-east), Erfurt (20 km (12 mi) north-west) and Weimar (12 km (7 mi) north).

== History ==
In 125, a Cistercian nunnery was founded at Bad Berka, and the sulphur bath spa was established in 1813.

Within the German Empire (1871–1918), Bad Berka was part of the Grand Duchy of Saxe-Weimar-Eisenach.

In 1945, bombing targets of the Oil Campaign of World War II were the Bad Berka oil plant, oil storage, and underground forced labor plant.

The annual Party.San Open Air music festival was first held in 1996.

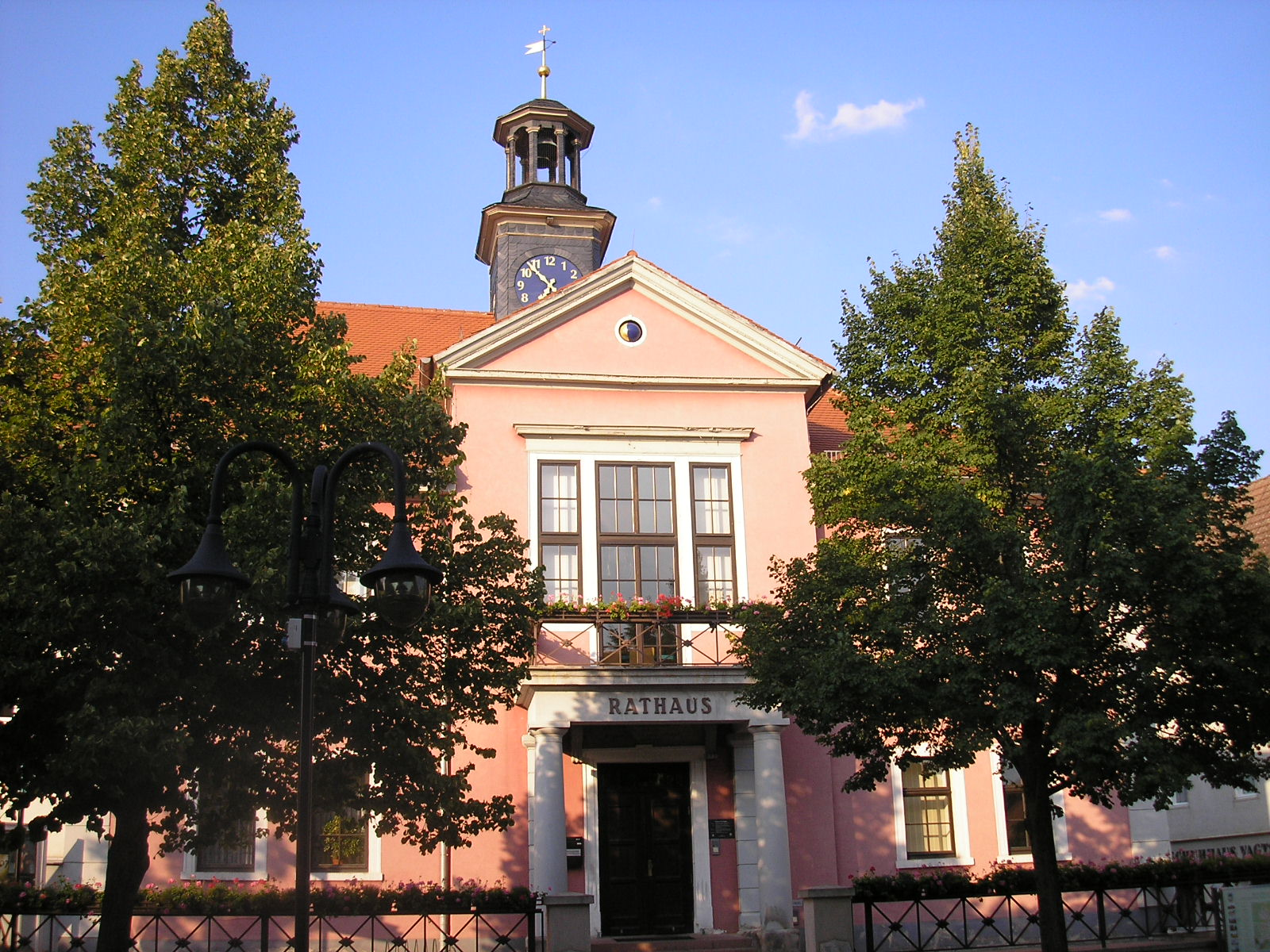
Bad Berka Town hall

== Sons and daughters of the town ==
- Otto Fries (1849–1905), politician National Liberal Party (Germany), member of Reichstag
- Hugo Günther (1891–1954), party functionary (SPD/KPD/KPO/SED) and insurance director
- Hans Carl Nipperdey (1895–1968), law professor, first president of the Federal Labour Court
- Hartmut Griesmayr (born 1945), screenwriter and director
- Henry Augustus Siebrecht, horticulturalist (1839–1934) born in Berka, studied in Göttingen, emigrated to America.

== People who are connected to the town ==
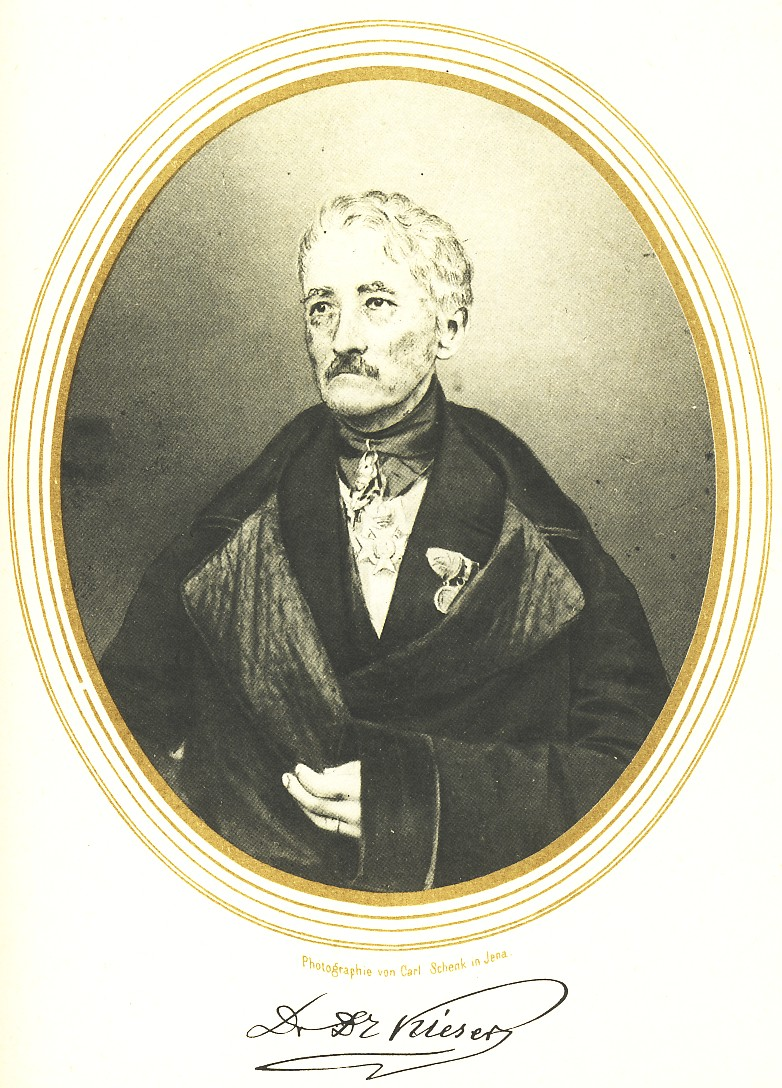
Dietrich Georg von Kieser in 1858

- Johann Wolfgang von Goethe (1749–1832), writer, stayed there as a visitor and bathing guest
- Jakob Michael Reinhold Lenz (1751–1792), poet of Sturm und Drang, wrote several works here
- Dietrich Georg von Kieser (1779–1862), medical doctor, worked as a physician in Berka
- Adolf Brütt (1855–1939), sculptor, worked in Weimar and Bad Berka, since 1928 honorary citizen of the city
- Hans Gerhard Gräf (1864–1942), Goethe researcher, investigated the relationship between Goethe and Bad Berka
- Martin Hellberg (1905–1999), author, actor and director, worked and lived in Bad Berka
- Wolfgang Blochwitz (1941–2005), football player, active among others for Carl Zeiss Jena, died in Bad Berka
- Albrecht Schröter (born 1955), educator and social scientist, Mayor of Jena from 2006 to 2018, worked as a speaker at ThILLM in Bad Berka from 1996 to 2000
- Henry Augustus Siebrecht (1849–1934), florist, "Father of Fifth Avenue"

== Town twinning ==
Bad Berka is twinned with:

- Żabno, Poland
- Solesmes, Nord, France
