= Ernst Barlach =

German expressionist sculptor, printmaker and writer (1870–1938)

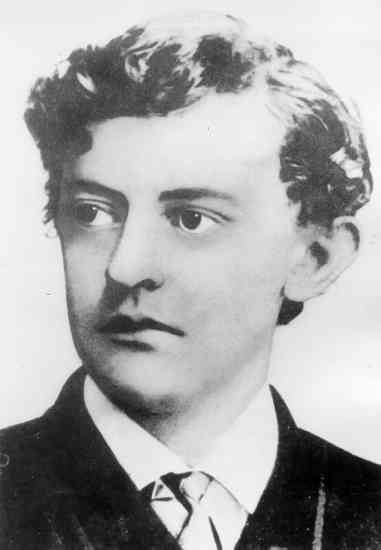
- Ernst Barlach in the 1890s
- Born: Ernst Heinrich Barlach; 2 January 1870; Wedel, Holstein, Kingdom of Prussia
- Died: 24 October 1938 (aged 68); Rostock, Mecklenburg, Germany
- Known for: Sculpture, printmaking, theater, literature
- Movement: Realism, Expressionism

Signature
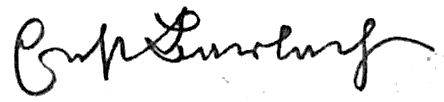

Ernst Heinrich Barlach (2 January 1870 – 24 October 1938) was a German expressionist sculptor, medallist, printmaker and writer. Although he was a supporter of the war in the years leading to World War I, his participation in the conflict made him change his position, and he is mostly known for his sculptures protesting against it. This created many conflicts during the rise of the Nazi Party, when most of his works were confiscated as degenerate art. Stylistically, his literary and artistic work would fall between the categories of twentieth-century Realism and Expressionism.

== Biography ==
=== Youth ===
Barlach was born in Wedel, Holstein, Kingdom of Prussia, the oldest of the four sons of Johanna Luise Barlach (née Vollert, 1845–1920) and the physician Dr. Georg Barlach (1839–1884). His early childhood was spent in Schönberg (Mecklenburg), where his father had practiced since 1872. In the fall of 1876, the family moved to Ratzeburg, where Barlach attended primary school. When his father died, early in 1884, the family returned to Schönberg, where Barlach attended secondary school. Barlach came from a Lutheran home.

=== Study years ===
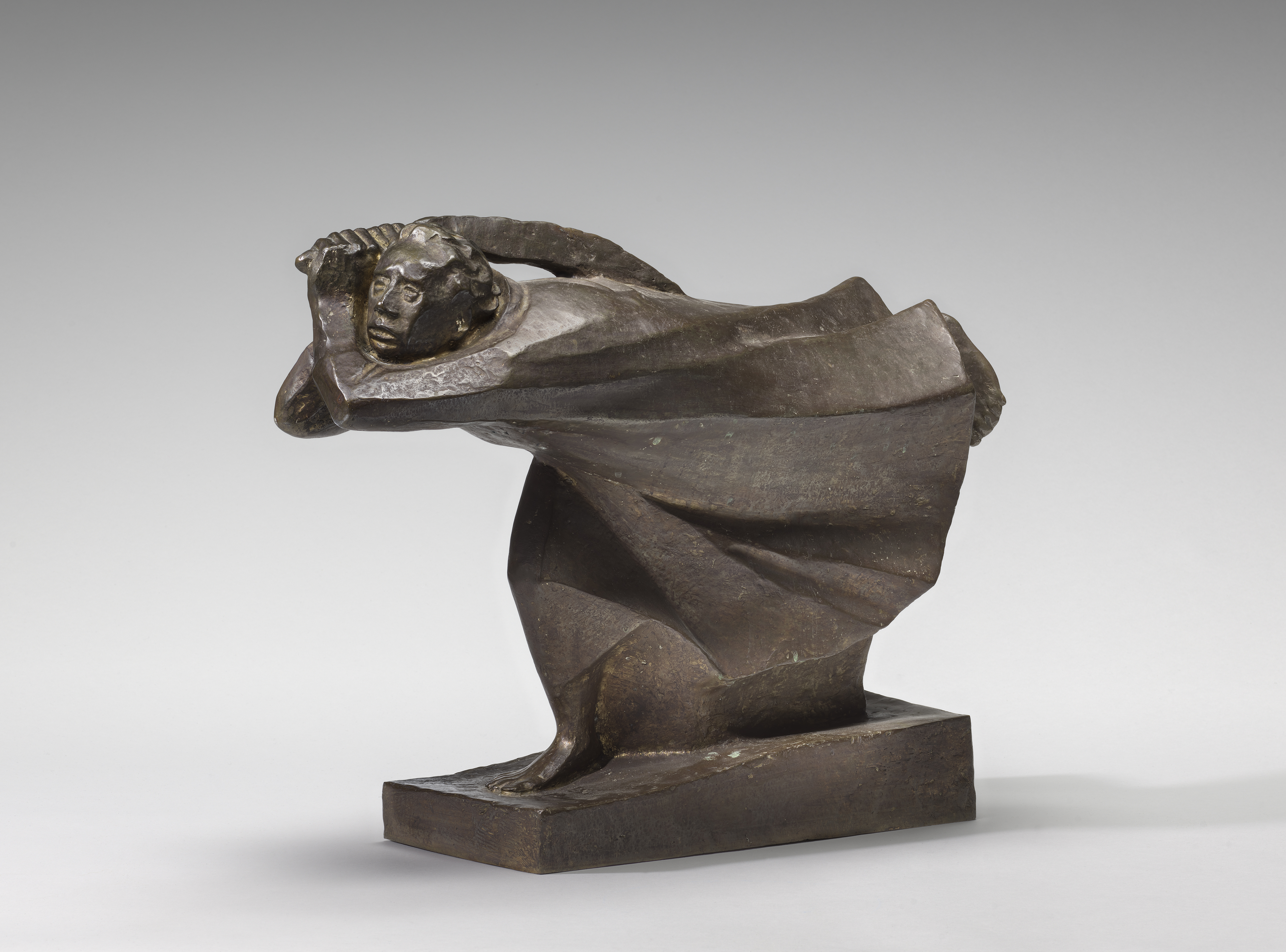
The Avenger, 1914, National Gallery of Art

Barlach studied from 1888 to 1891 at the Gewerbeschule Hamburg. Due to his artistic talent, he continued his studies at the Königliche Akademie der bildenden Künste zu Dresden (Royal Art School Dresden) as a student of Robert Diez between 1891 and 1895. He created his first major sculpture during this time, Die Krautpflückerin (The Herb Plucker). He continued his studies for one more year in Paris at the Académie Julian, from 1895 to 1897, but remained critical of the German tendency to copy the style of French artists. Nevertheless, he returned to Paris again for a few months in 1897 to undertake further studies.

=== Seeking ===
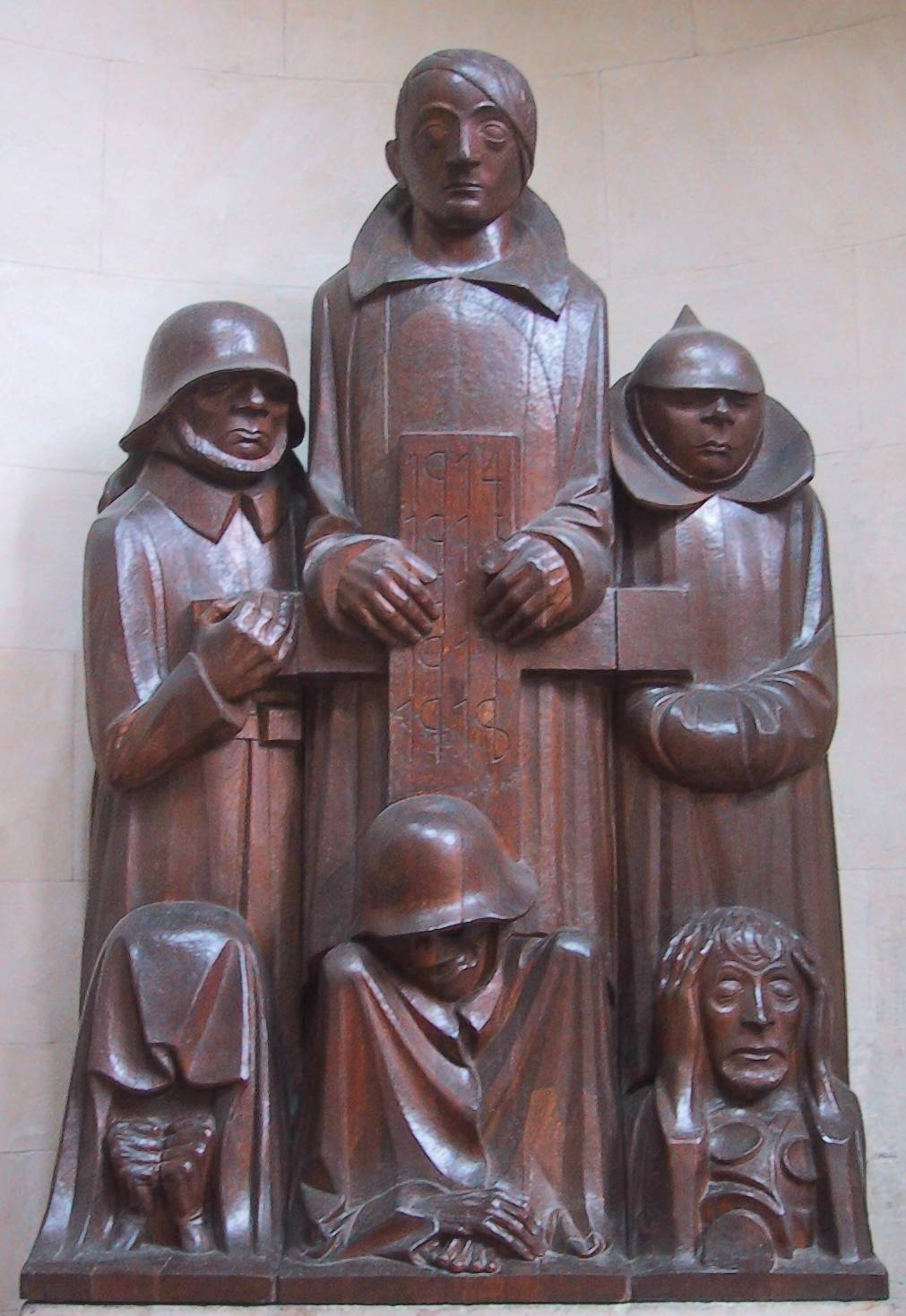
The Magdeburger Ehrenmal (Magdeburg commemorative sculpture) (1929), which created a large controversy about Barlach's anti-war position (Magdeburg Cathedral)

After his studies, Barlach worked for some time as a sculptor in Hamburg and Altona, working mainly in an Art Nouveau style. He produced illustrations for the Art Nouveau magazine Jugend 1897–1902, and made sculpture in a style close to Art Nouveau, including some ceramic statues. Afterwards, he also worked as a teacher at a school for ceramics. His first solo exhibition took place at the Kunstsalon Richard Mutz, Berlin, in 1904.

=== Formative years ===
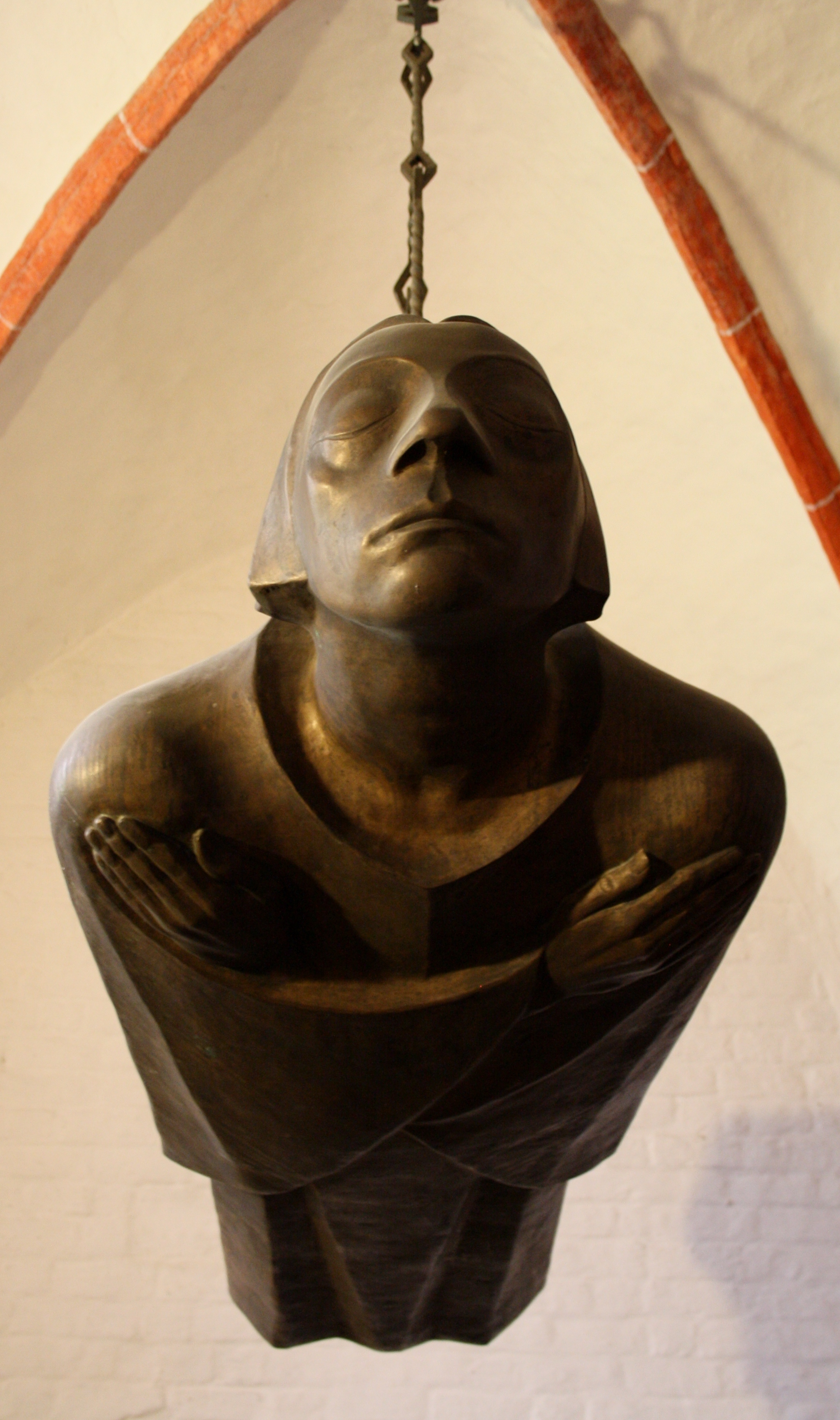
Schwebender Engel or Güstrower Ehrenmal by Ernst Barlach, hanging in Güstrow Cathedral

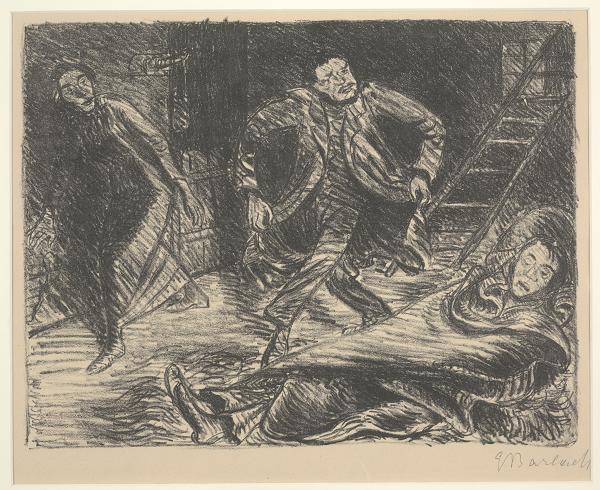
Desperate Dance, illustration for the play Der Arme Vetter (The Poor Cousin), 1919, Dallas Museum of Art

However, the lack of commercial success of his works depressed Barlach. To lighten up, he decided to travel for eight weeks together with his brother Nikolaus and to visit his brother Hans in Russia. This trip to Russia in 1906 was one of the greatest influences on him and his artistic style. Also during his travels in Russia his son Nikolaus was born on 20 August 1906, starting a two-year fight with the mother, Rosa Schwab, for the custody of the child, which Barlach was finally granted.

After returning from Russia, Barlach's financial situation improved considerably, as he received a fixed salary from the art dealer Paul Cassirer in exchange for his sculptures. The formative experiences in Russia and the financial security helped him to develop his own style, focusing on the faces and hands of the people in his sculptures and reducing the other parts of the figures to a minimum. He also began to make wood carvings and bronzes of figures swathed in heavy drapery like those in early Gothic art, and in dramatic attitudes expressive of powerful emotions and a yearning for spiritual ecstasy. He also worked for the German journal Simplicissimus, and started to produce some literature. His works were shown on various exhibitions. He also spent ten months in Florence, Italy in 1909 and afterwards settled in 1910 in Güstrow in Mecklenburg, where he spent the rest of his life.

In the years before World War I, Barlach was a patriotic and enthusiastic supporter of the war, awaiting a new artistic age from the war. This support for the war can also be seen in his works, as for example the statue Der Rächer (The Avenger), from December 1914. His awaited new artistic age came for him when he volunteered to join the war between 1915 and 1916 as an infantry soldier. After three months of service he was discharged due to a heart ailment, returning as a pacifist and a staunch opponent of war. The horror of the war influenced all of his subsequent works.

=== Popularity ===
Barlach's fame increased after the war, and he received many awards and became a member in the prestigious Preußische Akademie der Künste (Prussian Art Academy) in 1919 and the Akademie der Bildenden Künste München (Munich Art Academy) in 1925. Barlach rejected a number of honorary degrees and teaching positions. In 1925 he also met Bernhard and Marga Böhmer for the first time. He received the Kleist Prize for drama in 1924 for his Die Sündflut (The Flood), in which he projects his personal mysticism onto the story of Noah and the Ark. In 1926 he wrote Der blaue Boll (translated as Squire Blue Boll or Boozer Boll), an expressionist drama in which the eponymous squire almost succeeds in seducing a down-and-out young mother, before both achieve spiritual regeneration.

=== Interwar and World War II eras ===
From 1928 onward Barlach also generated many anti-war sculptures based on his experiences in the war. This pacifist position went against the political trend during the rise of Nazism, and he was the target of much criticism. For example, the Magdeburger Ehrenmal (Magdeburg cenotaph) was ordered by the city of Magdeburg to be a memorial of World War I, and it was expected to show heroic German soldiers fighting for their glorious country. Barlach, however, created a sculpture with three German soldiers, a fresh recruit, a young officer and an old reservist, standing in a cemetery, all bearing marks of the horror, pain and desperation of the war, flanked by a mourning war widow covering her face in despair, a skeleton wearing a German army helmet, and a civilian (the face is that of Barlach himself) with his eyes closed and blocking his ears in terror. This naturally created a controversy with the pro-war population (several nationalists and Nazis claimed that the soldiers must be foreign since true Germans would be more heroic), and the sculpture was removed. Friends of Barlach were able to hide the sculpture until after the war, when it was returned to the Magdeburg Cathedral. Yet the attacks on Barlach continued until his death.

The Fighter of the Spirit (Der Geistkämpfer), commissioned by the University Church of Kiel in northern Germany, was intended to be a memorial to humanistic and intellectual ideals in the aftermath of World War I (1914–18). The Nazis, angered by its anti-war message, removed it in 1937 and sawed the angel in parts—intending to melt it down. Instead, it was saved. In 1953, following World War II, it was repaired and installed outside the Church of St. Nicholas in Kiel (the University Church was destroyed during the war), but not before copies were made. The Minneapolis Institute of Art acquired one in 1959 and today it stands at the 24th Street entrance to the museum, the saw marks still visible.

In 1931 Barlach started to live with Marga Böhmer, whereas her ex-husband and Barlach's friend Bernhard Böhmer lived with his new wife Hella.

In 1936, Barlach's works were confiscated during an exhibition together with the works of Käthe Kollwitz and Wilhelm Lehmbruck, and the majority of his remaining works were confiscated as "degenerate art", for example the Güstrower Ehrenmal (Güstrow cenotaph) and the Hamburger Ehrenmal (Hamburg cenotaph). Barlach himself was prohibited from working as a sculptor, and his membership in the art academies was canceled. This rejection is reflected in his final works before his death from heart failure on 24 October 1938 in Rostock, Mecklenburg.

As a result of Nazi propaganda, Barlach was shunned by his fellow townspeople and was "condemned" (falsely) as a Jew and as a Bolshevik.

== Death and legacy ==
Barlach died in Rostock in 1938, and is buried in the cemetery of Ratzeburg. His funeral on 24 October 1938, was attended among others by writers Hugo Sieker and Hans Leip, and by Karl Schmidt-Rottluff; a memorial service for Barlach's 70th birthday was held on 1 January 1940, at Elisabeth Meyer's home at Schlüterstraße 52, attended by Leip, Sieker, Otto Lange, Rudolf Grothkop, and art dealer Peter Lüders. Ten years later Alfred Ehrhard remembered him and his struggle in two films; Ernst Barlach I: Der Kämpfer ('Fighter') and Ernst Barlach II: Der Überwinder ('Vanquisher'). Felix Walner edited a series of woodcuts about the Hamburg War Memorial in the same year.

In addition to his sculpture, Barlach also wrote eight Expressionist dramas, two novels and an autobiography Ein selbsterzähltes Leben 1928, and had a distinguished oeuvre of woodcuts and lithographs from about 1910 onwards, including illustrations for his own plays.

== Selected works ==
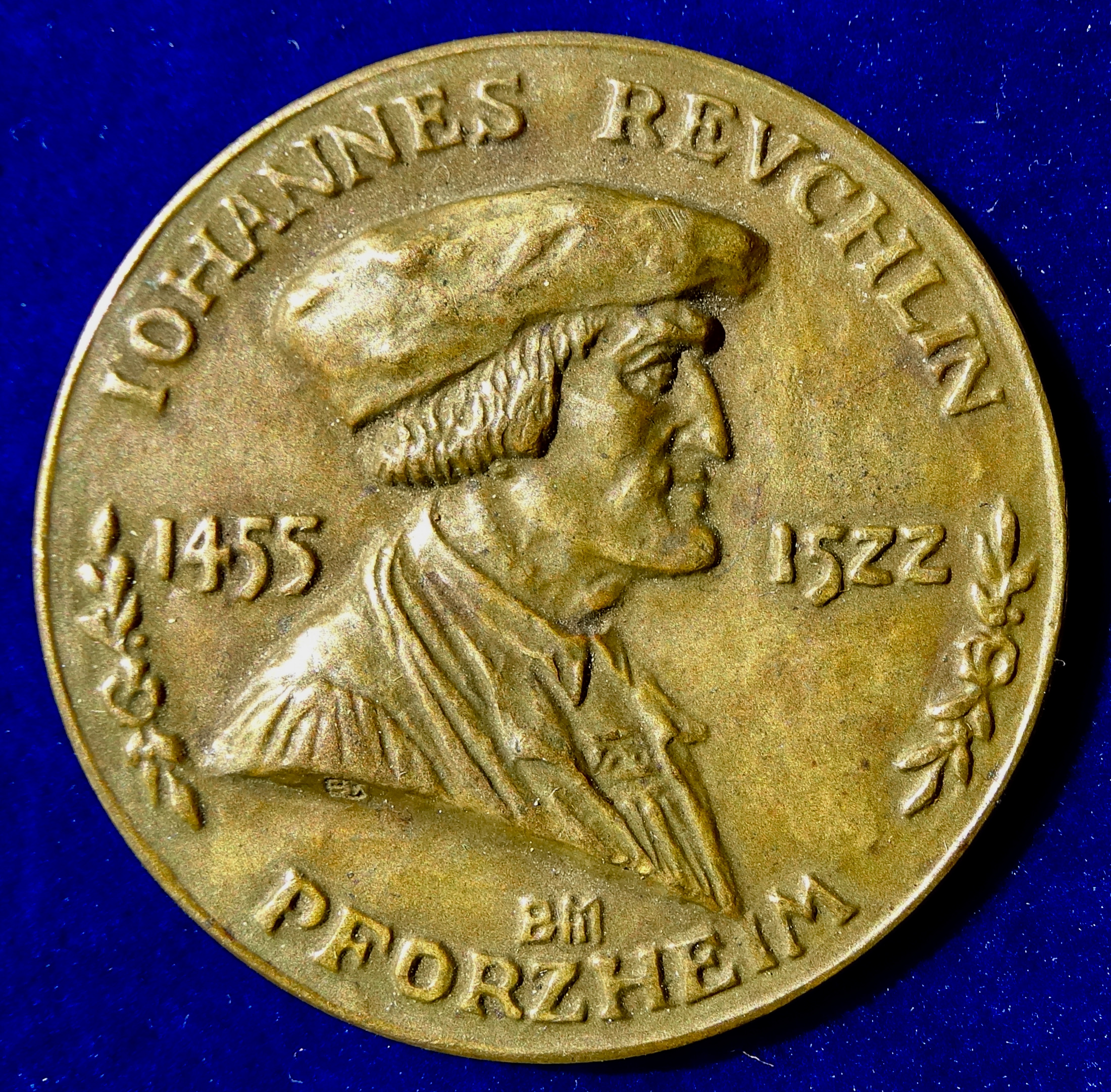
Johannes Reuchlin 400th Anniversary of his Death 1522 Medal 1922, obverse

- 1894: Die Krautpflückerin (The Herb Plucker)
- 1907: Der Melonenesser (The Melon Eater, bronze)
- 1908: Sitzendes Weib (Sitting Woman), Nürnberg
- 1912: Schlafendes Bauernpaar (Sleeping peasant couple), Rostock
- 1914: Der Rächer (The Avenger, bronze)
- 1917: Der tote Tag (The Dead Day, play)
- 1919: Der arme Vetter (The Poor Cousin, play)
- 1919: Mutter und Kind (Mother and Child, bronze)
- 1920: Die Wandlungen Gottes: Der göttliche Bettler (Transfiguration of God: Third Day)
- 1921: Die echten Sedemunds (The Real Sedemunds, play)
- 1921: Johannes Reuchlin (Bronze medal)
- 1924: Die Sintflut (The Flood, play)
- 1925: Der Tod (The Death) Museum Wiesbaden
- 1926: Das Wiedersehen (Christ and Thomas, in wood), Staatliches Museum Schwerin
- 1926: Der blaue Boll (Squire Blue Boll, play)
- 1927: Der schwebende Engel or Güstrower Ehrenmal (The Floating Angel, bronze), Antoniterkirche Cologne and Güstrow Cathedral
- 1928: Der singende Mann (The Singing Man, bronze), Nürnberg
- 1928 Der Geistkämpfer (The Ghost Fighter; The Fighter of the Spirit), Kiel
- 1929: Magdeburger Ehrenmal (Magdeburg cenotaph), Cathedral of Magdeburg, Magdeburg
- 1930: Bettler auf Krücken (Beggar on Crutches)
- 1931: Hamburger Ehrenmal (Hamburg cenotaph), Hamburg
- 1935: Fries der Lauschenden. (nine wooden figures), Ernst Barlach Haus, Hamburg
- 1936: Der Buchleser (The Book Reader), Schwerin

== Art market ==
On 2 May 2012, Barlach's carved wood sculpture Weinende Frau sold at Christie's for $938,500, setting a new world auction record for a price paid for Barlach's work.

== Works cited ==
- Banham, Martin, ed. 1998. "Barlach, Ernst". In The Cambridge Guide to Theatre. Cambridge: Cambridge University Press. ISBN 0-521-43437-8. pp. 78–79.
- Ritchie, James McPherson, ed. 1968 Seven Expressionist Plays. German Expressionism Ser. London: John Calder, Dallas: Riverrun, 1980. ISBN 0-7145-0521-8.
