= Jean Porter (theologian) =

American Catholic theologian and professor (born 1955)

- Born: 1955 (age 70–71); Oklahoma, U.S.
- Occupation: Theologian

Academic background
- Education: Yale University
- Influences: Thomas Aquinas

Jean Porter (born 1955) is an American theologian, currently the John A. O'Brien Endowed Professor of Theology at University of Notre Dame. To date, she has written "numerous articles and six books on the history of the Christian moral tradition and its contemporary relevance".

Porter received a BA in philosophy from The University of Texas in 1976, an M.Div. from Weston School of Theology in 1980, and a Ph.D. from Yale University in 1984.

Prior to teaching at Notre Dame, she taught at Vanderbilt Divinity School from 1984–1990.

She was President of the Society of Christian Ethics from 2005-2006 and serves on the editorial boards of the Journal for the Society of Christian Ethics, The Journal of Religious Ethics, and the Journal of the American Academy of Religion.

In 2012, she was elected to the American Academy of Arts and Sciences (AAAS). She gave the Stone lectures at Princeton in 2011 and the Gradwell Lecture at Liverpool Hope University in 2004.

== Works ==
- Ministers of the Law: A Natural Law Theory of Legal Authority. Eerdmans. 2010. ISBN 978-0802865632. OCLC 867947395. Winner of a Catholic Press Association Book Award, 2011
- Nature as Reason: A Thomistic Theory of the Natural Law. Eerdmans. 2005. ISBN 0802849067. OCLC 783268958.
- Natural and Divine Law: Reclaiming the Tradition for Christian Ethics. Eerdmans. 1999. ISBN 0802846971. OCLC 505767580.
- Moral Action and Christian Ethics. Cambridge University Press. 1995. ISBN 0521657105. OCLC 1029094623.
- The Recovery of Virtue: The Relevance of Aquinas for Christian Ethics. Westminster. 1990. ISBN 0281047324. OCLC 1075097314.
