= Carter Heyward =

American Anglican priest and feminist theologian (born 1945)

The Reverend Carter Heyward
- Born: Isabel Carter Heyward; August 22, 1945 (age 81); Charlotte, North Carolina, US
- Partner: Beverly Wildung Harrison

Ecclesiastical career
- Religion: Christianity (Anglican)
- Church: Episcopal Church (United States)
- Ordained: 1974 (priest; irregular)

Academic background
- Education: Randolph-Macon Woman's College; Columbia University; Union Theological Seminary
- Doctoral advisor: Tom F. Driver
- Influences: Mary Daly; Audre Lorde; Adrienne Rich; Alice Walker; Elie Wiesel

Academic work
- Discipline: Theology
- Sub-discipline: Christology
- School or tradition: Christian feminism; liberation theology
- Institutions: Episcopal Divinity School
- Influenced: Marvin Ellison; Beverly Wildung Harrison

Isabel Carter Heyward (born 1945) is an American feminist theologian and priest in the Episcopal Church, the province of the worldwide Anglican Communion in the United States. In 1974, she was one of the Philadelphia Eleven, eleven women whose ordinations eventually paved the way for the recognition of women as priests in the Episcopal Church in 1976.

== Early life ==
Heyward was born on August 22, 1945, in Charlotte, North Carolina. She graduated from East Mecklenburg High School in 1963. She was presented to society as a debutante at the Charlotte Debutante Ball in 1964.

== Academic career ==
Heyward holds the degree of Bachelor of Arts from Randolph-Macon Woman's College (now Randolph College) in Lynchburg, Virginia, the degree of Master of Arts in the comparative study of religion from Columbia University, and that of Master of Divinity in religion and psychiatry from Union Theological Seminary. She was awarded a Doctor of Philosophy degree in systematic theology in 1980 for her work on redemption in the thought of two early Christian thinkers. She taught at Episcopal Divinity School in Cambridge, Massachusetts, from 1975, and was Howard Chandler Robbins Professor of Theology there until she retired in 2006. The inaugural Carter Heyward Scholars Lecture was given at the college in her honor in October 2006. She received the Distinguished Alumni/ae Award from Union Theological Seminary in 1998.

== Theology ==
=== Nature of God ===
Author of a number of books and numerous articles, Heyward's most distinctive theological idea is that it is open to each of us to incarnate God (that is, to embody God's power), and that we do so most fully when we seek to relate genuinely to others in what she calls "relationality". When we do this, we are said to be "godding", a verb Heyward herself coined. God is defined in her work as "our power in mutual relation". Alluding to mainstream Christian views of God, Heyward has stated "I am not much of a theist". For her, "the shape of God is justice", so human activity can, as theologian Lucy Tatman has observed, be divine activity whenever it is just and loving. In her book Saving Jesus From Those Who Are Right, Heyward asserts that "the love we make ... is God's own love". In Heyward's work, God is therefore not a personal figure, but instead the ground of being, seen for example in compassionate action, which is "the movement of God in and through the heights and depths of all that is".

=== Jesus ===
Again in contrast to the more traditional Christian focus (on Jesus Christ as God incarnated as a redeemer), Heyward believes that "God was indeed in Jesus just as God is in us – as our Sacred, Sensual Power, deeply infusing our flesh, root of our embodied yearning to reach out to one another". This power works to change despair, fear and apathy to hope, courage and what Heyward terms "justice-love". But God's Spirit is not contained "solely in one human life or religion or historical event or moment". God was Jesus' relational power for "forging right (mutual) relation, in which Jesus himself and those around him were empowered to be more fully who they were called to be". Insisting on the God-incarnating power of all, Heyward observes that "the human act of love, befriending, making justice is our act of making God incarnate in the world". In her recent work she suggests that even the non-human creation may incarnate God, commenting that "there are more faces of Jesus on earth, throughout history and all of nature, than we can begin even to imagine". Not unrelated to this perception, Heyward founded the Free Rein Center for Therapeutic Horseback Riding and Education at Brevard, North Carolina, where she is an instructor

=== Task of theology ===
A consequence of this dynamic view of God and Christ is that truth is evolving, not static. A hint of this can be seen in Heyward's approval of Dorothee Sölle's remark that God's Spirit works through "revolutionary patience". This leaves a certain openness to the church's work of proclaiming the truth of Christ: there is an insistence that "we who currently constitute the Christian church are the temporary authors and guardians of 'Christian truth'. It is ours to determine and ours to tend". So the theologian's task involves "a capacity to discern God's presence here and now and to reflect on what this means", and is part of a communal effort and struggle to enable the flourishing of love and justice in a world where the potential for relationality is broken, often violently. The project of "godding", or relationality, then, is an alternative to an authoritarian understanding of social/relational power, both inside and outside the church. Mutual relationship entails a willingness to participate in healing a broken world, and so is not (Lucy Tatman notes) a private or individualistic task.

Heyward sees her own task within this broader program as working particularly for the expansion of the church to include people who have historically been left out. In short, the theologian's task is to help bring a greater measure of redemption to the world. Though that task is always concrete, the precise shape it takes depends on the exact "shape of the evil from which people need to be redeemed". On her home page at Episcopal Divinity School, Heyward's wrote that her passion as a theological educator was to enable students to "do theology at its roots: making connections between their daily lives, their relationships and work, their faith and politics – and those of others, past and present, those like them, and those unlike them. The only theology worth doing is that which inspires and transforms lives, that which empowers us to participate in creating, liberating, and blessing the world."

== Bibliography ==
Heyward is the author of some eleven books and has edited / contributed to a further three. She is the author of numerous scholarly and more mainstream articles. An appreciation of Heyward's work can be found in chapter five of Lucy Tatman's 2001 book Knowledge That Matters: A Feminist Theological Paradigm and Epistemology (London: Sheffield Academic Press).

Heyward was also the author of When Boundaries Betray Us (1993), which was a source of controversy. Some read it superficially as an account of Heyward falling in love with her therapist or simply a bad match between therapist and client. Others read it as a critique of the structure of traditional psychoanalytic therapy for its skewed power-imbalance. Over time and two editions, the latter interpretation has prevailed among many serious psychotherapists.

In 2014 she co-edited with Janine Lehane The Spirit of the Lord Is upon Me: The Writings of Suzanne Hiatt (Seabury Books, NY). She was a key figure among the Philadelphia Eleven and an "unofficial bishop" to many a woman ordinand and/or deacon in the United States and abroad.

In 2017, she wrote the book She Flies On: A White Southern Christian Debutante Wakes Up.

== See also ==
- Mary E. Hunt
