= Antoniterkirche (Cologne) =

Church in Cologne-Altstadt-Nord, Germany

Coordinates: 50°56′10″N 6°57′11″E

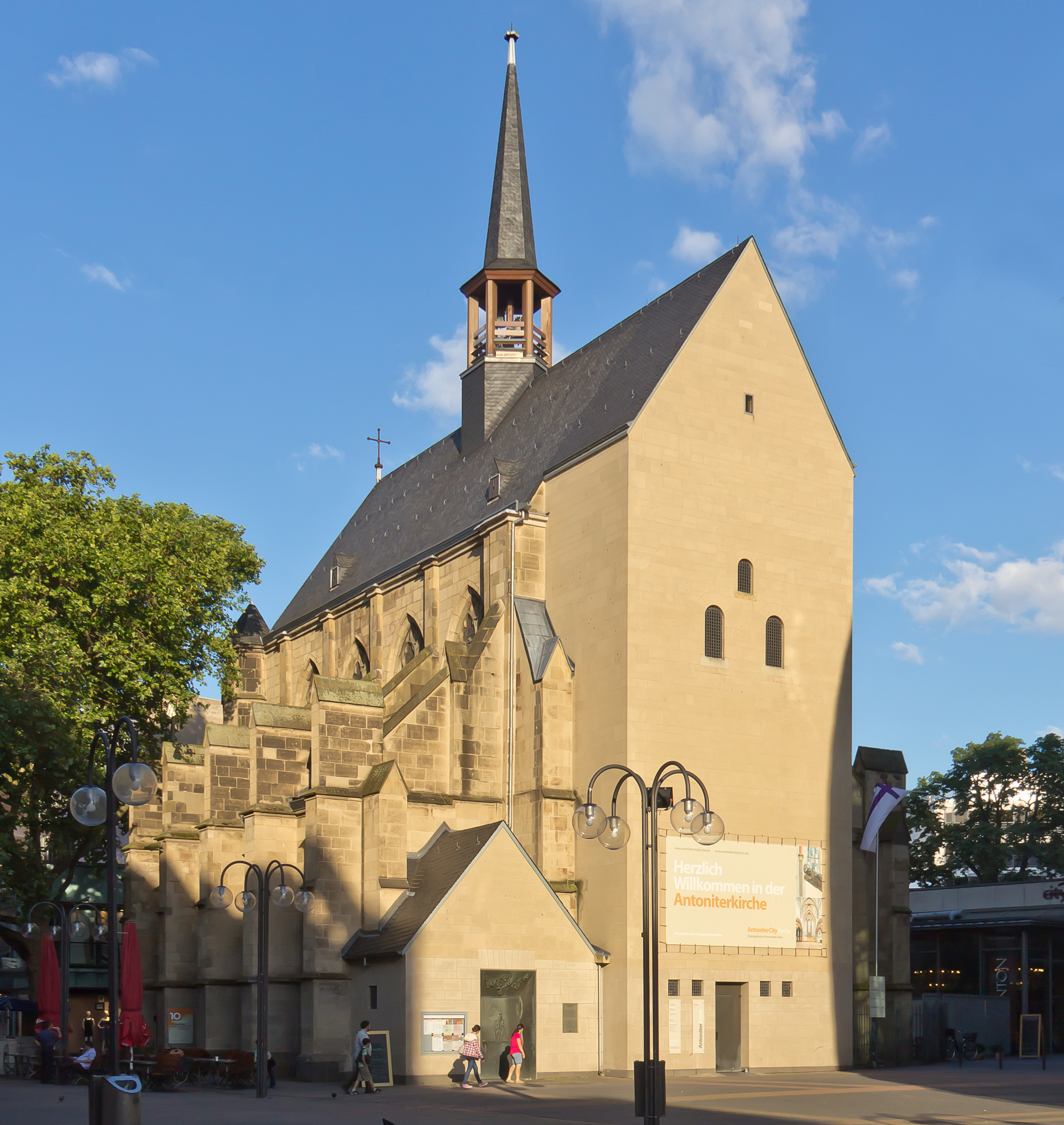
Antoniterkirche in Cologne

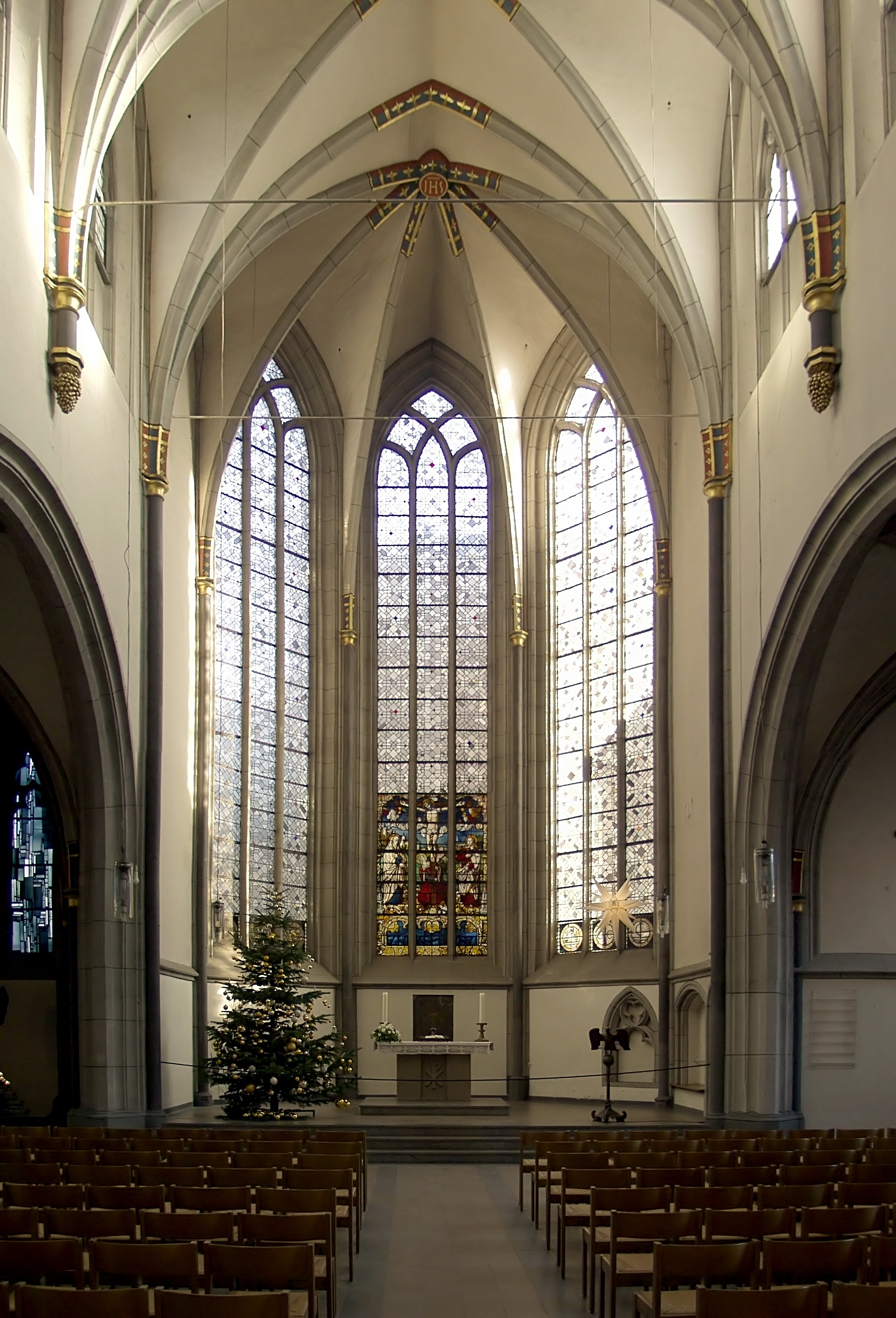
Interior from the east end

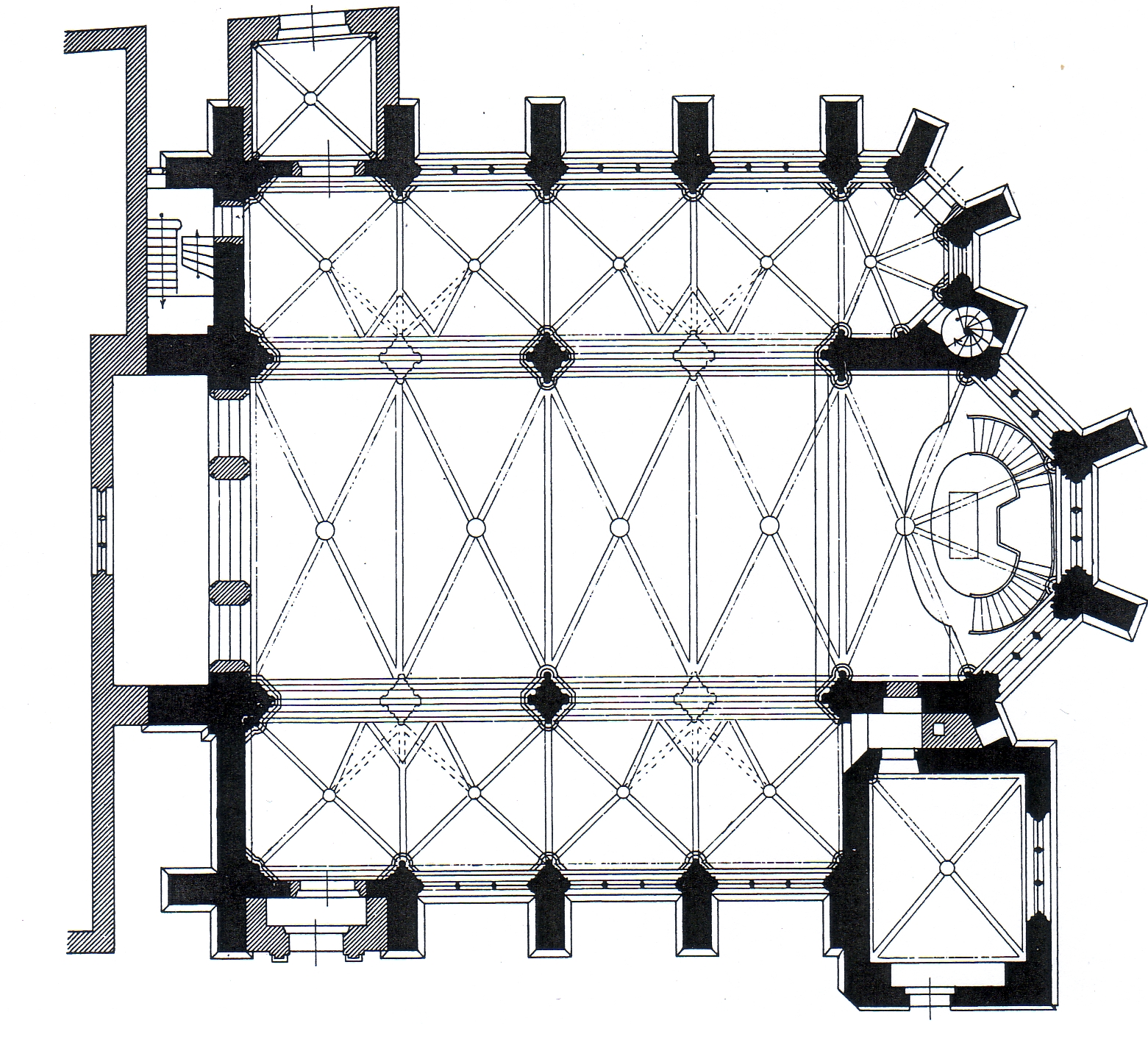
Floor plan in 1913

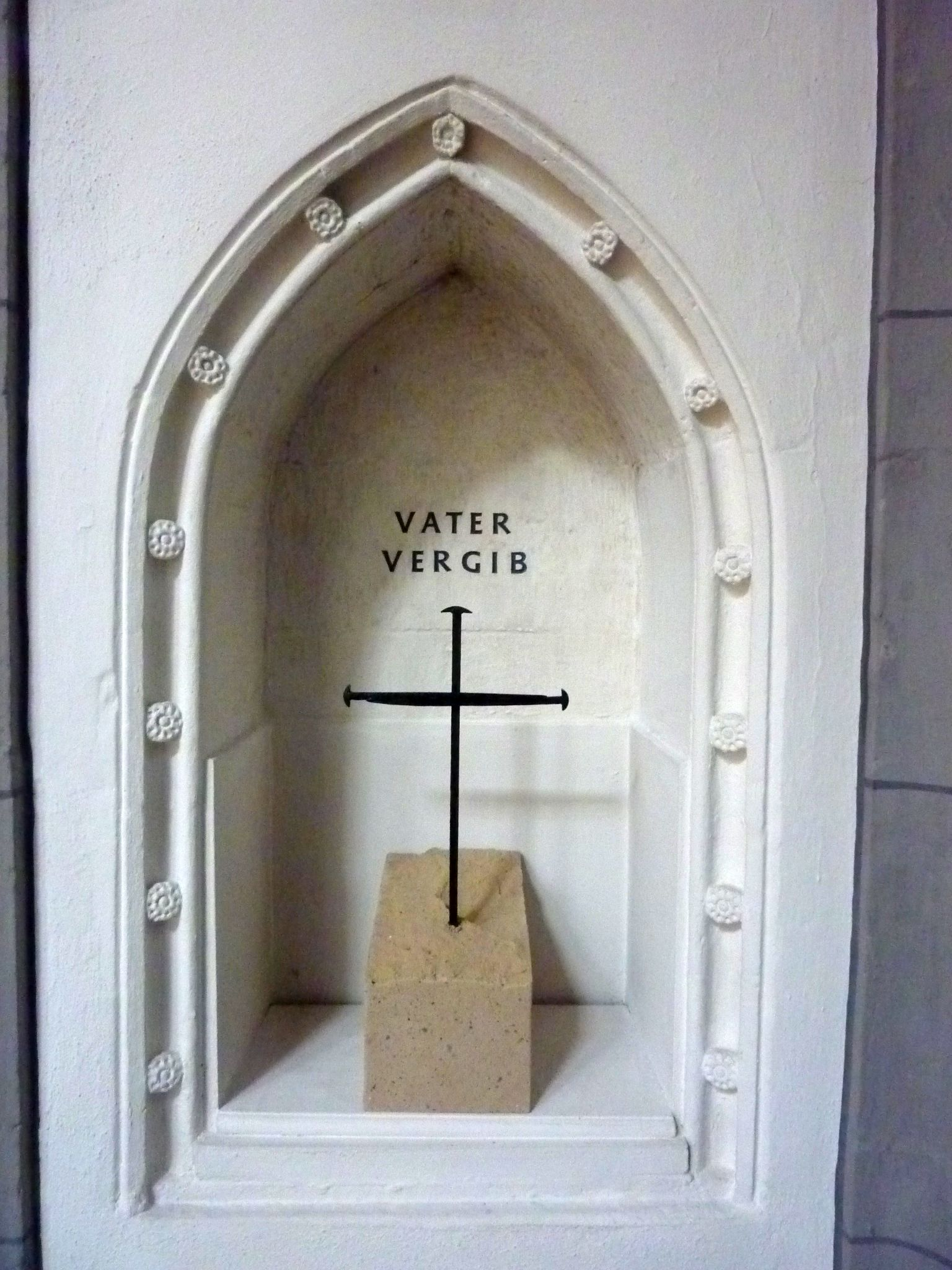
Coventry Cross of Nails in the north side-chapel

The Antoniterkirche is a Gothic church building on the Schildergasse in central Cologne, Germany, named after the Hospital Brothers of St. Anthony who founded it between 1350 and 1370–1378. Now used by the Protestant Church, it is the second most-visited church in the city after Cologne Cathedral. The Resistance fighter Freya von Moltke was baptised there.

It has become known throughout Germany as the venue for the 'Politisches Nachtgebet' (with the likes of Dorothee Sölle) and the site of Ernst Barlach's artwork Der Schwebende, also known as Angel, as well as Kruzifix II and Der Lehrende. Since 2016 it has been a member of the Coventry Cross of Nails.
