= William F. May (ethicist) =

American ethicist (1927–2023)

William Francis May (October 25, 1927 – October 27, 2023) was an American ethicist, academic, theologian, and ordained Presbyterian minister. His work focused primarily on questions of medical and bioethics, professional ethics in general, and public responsibility and policy.

== Early life and education ==
May was born in Chicago, Illinois. He was the oldest of Harry S. May and Leontine Torczynski's four children. He was in the 5th grade, when his family moved to Houston, Texas where he graduated from San Jacinto High School. At San Jacinto he was a member of the 1944 UIL debate championship team. At sixteen, he was accepted to the Princeton School of Public and International Affairs with an initial intent to pursue a career in law and politics, but the sudden death of his high school debate coach shortly before he left for Princeton had a profound effect on him, leading him to the study history and philosophy.

He graduated from Princeton, Phi Beta Kappa, at the age of 20. May served as the interim pastor of a small church in Oklahoma before enrolling at the Yale Divinity School where he earned a BD degree and ultimately a PhD in contemporary theology.

== Academic career ==
While simultaneously pursuing his doctorate at Yale, May began his teaching career in theology at Smith College. He served as Chair of the Department of Religion twice while at Smith College.

Four years after completing his doctorate, May joined Indiana University as founder and chair of a new Department of Religious Studies.

He left Indiana to assume the Joseph P. Kennedy Sr. chair as Professor of Christian Ethics at the Kennedy Institute of Ethics, Georgetown University.

In 1985, May began teaching at Southern Methodist University as Cary M. Maguire University Professor of Ethics until 2001. During his tenure at SMU, May also served as the inaugural director of the Cary M. Maguire Center for Ethics and Public Responsibility from 1995 to 1998. In 2017, the directorship of the Maguire Center for Ethics was endowed in May's name.

Following his retirement from SMU, May served as a visiting professor at the Institution for Social and Policy studies, Yale University, 2000 and 2001.

He moved to Charlottesville, Virginia where he was a Fellow of the Institute for Practical Ethics and Public Life at the University of Virginia before eventually retiring entirely from writing, teaching and speaking professionally.

== Other Professional Affiliations ==
May is a former President of the American Academy of Religion and the Society of Christian Ethics.

He was a founding fellow of The Hastings Center where he co-chaired its research group on death and dying.

He served on the Ethical Foundations subgroup for the Clinton Task Force on Health Care Reform 1993 and was a member of the President's Council on Bioethics from 2002 to 2004

In September 2007, James H. Billington named May the Cary and Ann Maguire Chair in American History and Ethics at the John W. Kluge Center. May retained the position for three months.

== Recognition ==
Fellowships:

- The Danforth Foundation
- The Lilly Endowment
- The Guggenheim Foundation

Awards:

- Indiana University Distinguished Teaching Award - 1970
- Southern Methodist University Scholar/Teacher Award - 1989
- American Academy of Religion Outstanding Teaching Award - 1993
- Yale Divinity School Distinction in Theological Education/Scholarship award - 2000

== Personal ==
May was married to the Broadway and Obie Award winning actress, Beverly May for over 60 years. They raised four children together.

He served as the moderator of the seasonal Randolph Church, a historic church in Randolph, NH where he guest-preached nearly every summer for over 50 years.

He died on October 27, 2023, two days after his 96th birthday.

== Select publications ==
- May, William F. (1983). The Physician's Covenant: Images of the Healer in Medical Ethics. Westminster John Knox Press. ISBN 9780664244972.
- May, William F. (1991). The Patient's Ordeal. Indiana University Press. ISBN 9780253208705.
- May, William F. (2004) [1996]. Testing the Medical Covenant: Active Euthanasia and Health Care Reform. Wipf & Stock. ISBN 9781592444533.
- May, William F.; Soens Jr., A. Lewis, eds. (2000). The Ethics of Giving and Receiving: Am I My Foolish Brother's Keeper?. Southern Methodist University Press. ISBN 9780870744525.
- May, William F. (2001). Beleaguered Rulers: The Public Obligation of the Professional. Westminster John Knox Press. ISBN 9780664226718.
- May, William F. (2011). Testing the National Covenant: Fears and Appetites in American Politics. Georgetown University Press. ISBN 9781589017658.
- May, William F. (1967). A Catalogue of Sins: A Contemporary Examination of Christian Conscience. Holt, Rinehart & Winston.
