= Dorothee Sölle =

German Christian theologian (1929–2003)

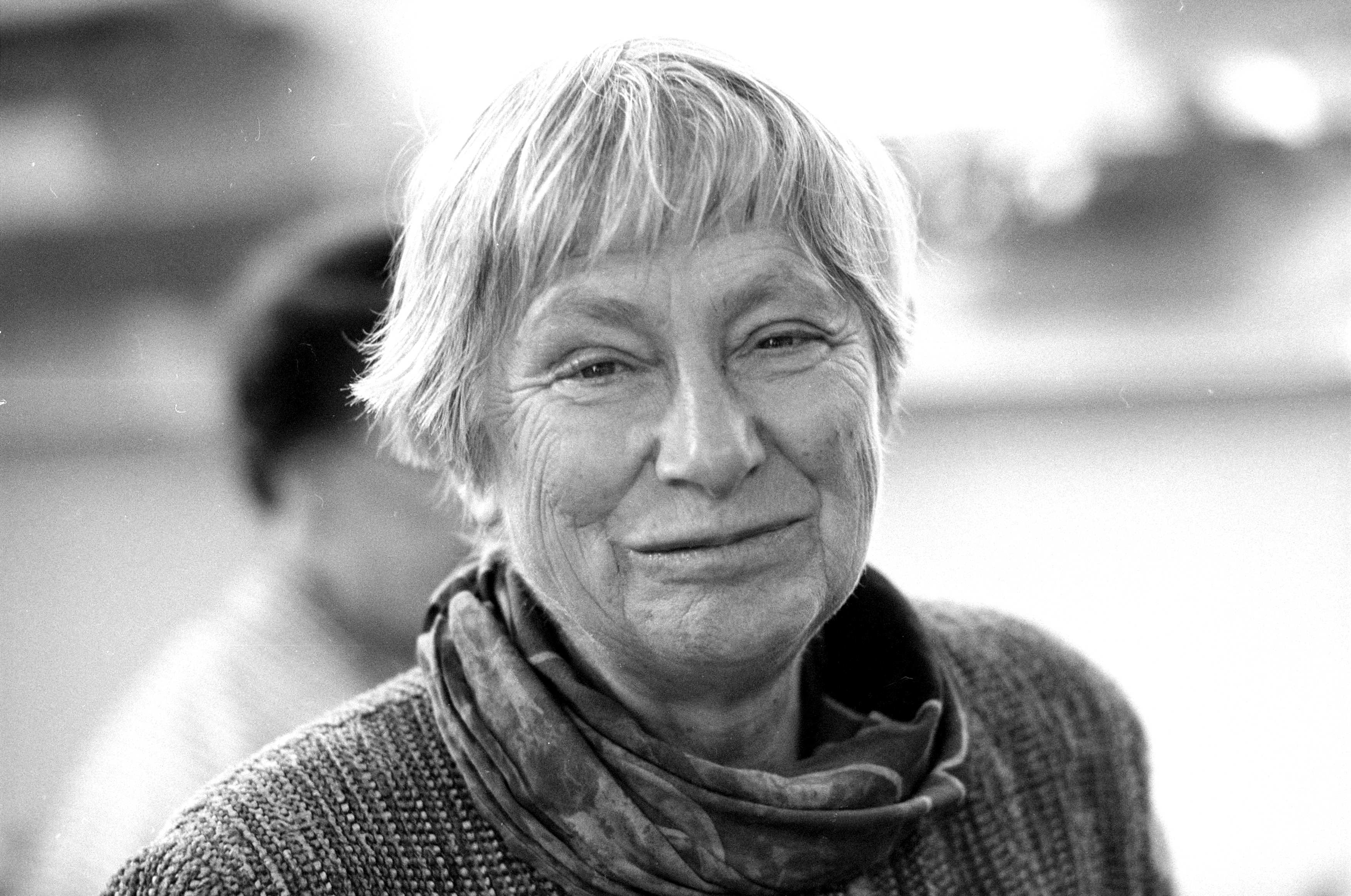
- Dorothee Sölle in 1998
- Born: Dorothee Nipperdey; 30 September 1929; Cologne, Prussia, Germany
- Died: 27 April 2003 (aged 73); Göppingen, Baden-Württemberg, Germany
- Other name: Dorothee Steffensky-Sölle
- Spouses: Dietrich Sölle (m. 1954; div. 1964); Fulbert Steffensky (m. 1969)

Academic background
- Education: University of Cologne
- Thesis: Studies in the Structures of Bonaventura's Vigils (Note: Original title: Untersuchungen zur Struktur der Nachtwachen von Bonaventura.)
- Influences: Dietrich Bonhoeffer; Martin Buber; Rudolf Bultmann; Meister Eckhart; Friedrich Gogarten; G. W. F. Hegel; Martin Luther

Academic work
- Discipline: Theology
- Sub-discipline: Political theology
- School or tradition: Christian socialism; feminist theology; liberation theology; Lutheranism
- Institutions: Union Theological Seminary
- Notable ideas: Christofascism
- Influenced: Mary Grey; Beverly Wildung Harrison; Carter Heyward; Adam Kotsko

Dorothee Steffensky-Sölle (née Nipperdey; 1929–2003), known as Dorothee Sölle, was a German Lutheran liberation theologian who coined the term "Christofascism".

== Life and career ==
Sölle was born Dorothee Nipperdey on 30 September 1929 in Cologne, Germany. Her father was Professor of labour law Hans Carl Nipperdey, who would later become the first president of the West-German Federal Labour Court from 1954 to 1963. Sölle studied theology, philosophy, and literature at the University of Cologne, earning a doctorate with a thesis on the connections between theology and poetry. She taught briefly in Aachen before returning to Cologne as a university lecturer. She became active in politics, speaking out against the Vietnam War, the arms race of the Cold War, and injustices in the developing world. Notably, from 1968 to 1972 she organized the weekly ecumenical Politisches Nachtgebet (political prayer night) taking place in the Antoniterkirche (Cologne). Those were sunday evening services which by means of prayers, performances and considerations of protest addressed contemporary issues such as the war in Vietnam/Laos/Campodia, authoritarian patterns in church, faith and public life.

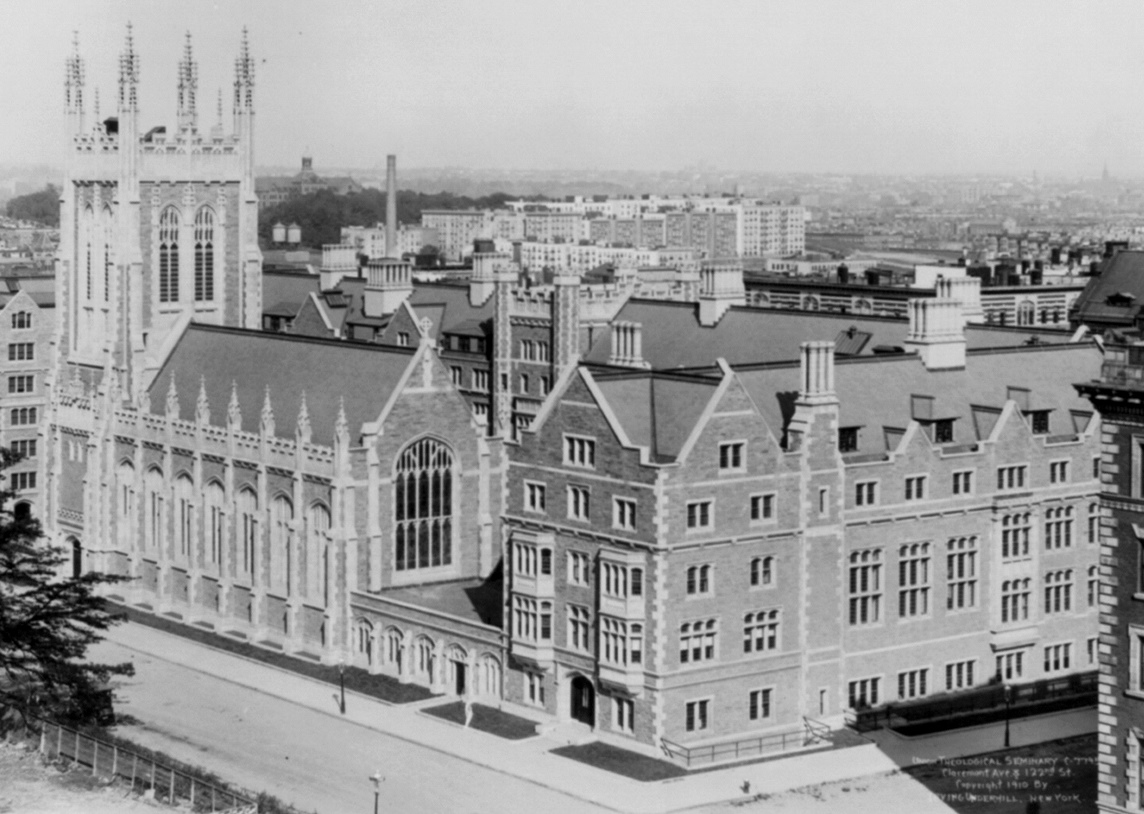
Union Theological Seminary, New York

Between 1975 and 1987, she spent six months a year at Union Theological Seminary in New York City, where she was a professor of systematic theology. Although she never held a professorship in Germany, she received an honorary professorship from the University of Hamburg in 1994.

She wrote a large number of books, including Theology for Skeptics: Reflections on God (1968), The Silent Cry: Mysticism and Resistance (1997), and her autobiography Against the Wind: Memoir of a Radical Christian (1999). In Beyond Mere Obedience: Reflections on a Christian Ethic for the Future she coined the term Christofascist to describe fundamentalists. Perhaps her best-known work in English has been Suffering, which offers a critique of "Christian masochism" and "Christian sadism". Sölle's critique is against the assumption that God is all-powerful and the cause of suffering; humans thus suffer for some greater purpose. Instead, God suffers and is powerless alongside us. Humans are to struggle together against oppression, sexism, antisemitism, and other forms of authoritarianism.

Sölle was married twice and had four children. First, in 1954 she married the seven years older visual artist Dietrich Sölle, with whom she had three children before divorcing in 1964. In 1969, she married the former Benedictine priest Fulbert Steffensky, with whom she had her fourth child and with whom she organized the Politisches Nachtgebet. The 19th century Germany historian and university professor Thomas Nipperdey has been her brother.

Sölle died of a heart attack at a conference in Göppingen on 27 April 2003. She has been buried on the Nienstedten Cemetery in Hamburg.

== Theology ==
The idea of a God who was "in heaven in all its glory" while Auschwitz was organized was "unbearable" for Sölle. God has to be protected against such simplifications. For some people Sölle was a kind of prophet of Christianity, who abolished the separation of theological science and practice of life, while for others she was a heretic, whose theories couldn't be reconciled with the traditional understanding of God, and her ideas were therefore rejected as a theological cynicism.

== Publications ==
- Sölle, Dorothee (1967). Christ the Representative: An Essay in Theology After the 'Death of God'. London: SCM Press.
- ——— (1970). Beyond Mere Obedience: Reflections on a Christian Ethic for the Future. Minneapolis: Augsburg.
- ——— (1974). Political Theology. Philadelphia, PA: Fortress Press. ISBN 0-8006-1065-2.
- ——— (1975). Suffering. Philadelphia, PA: Fortress Press. ISBN 0-8006-0419-9.
- ——— (1978). Death by Bread Alone: Texts and Reflections on Religious Experience. Philadelphia, PA: Fortress Press. ISBN 0-8006-0514-4.
- ——— (1981). Choosing Life. Philadelphia, PA: Fortress Press. ISBN 0-8006-0667-1.
- ——— (1983). Of war and Love. Maryknoll, NY: Orbis Books. ISBN 0-88344-350-3.
- ——— (1983). The Arms Race Kills Even Without War. Philadelphia, PA: Fortress Press. ISBN 0-8006-1701-0.
- ——— (1984). The Strength of the Weak: Toward a Christian Feminist Identity. Philadelphia, PA: Fortress Press. ISBN 0-664-24623-0.
- ———; Cloyes, Shirley A. (1984). To Work and to Love: A Theology of Creation. Philadelphia, PA: Fortress Press. ISBN 0-8006-1782-7.
- ———; Beyers Naudé, C. F. (1986). Hope for Faith: A Conversation. Geneva: WCC Publications. ISBN 2-8254-0860-3.
- ——— (1990). The Window of Vulnerability: A Political Spirituality. Minneapolis: Fortress Press. ISBN 0-8006-2432-7.
- ——— (1990). Thinking About God: An Introduction to Theology. London: SCM Press. ISBN 0-334-02476-5.
- ——— (1993). On Earth as in Heaven: A Liberation Spirituality of Sharing. Louisville, KY: Westminster John Knox Press. ISBN 0-664-25494-2.
- ——— (1993). Stations of the Cross: A Latin American Pilgrimage. Minneapolis: Fortress Press. ISBN 0-8006-2688-5.
- ——— (1995). Theology for Skeptics: Reflections on God. Minneapolis: Fortress Press. ISBN 0-8006-2788-1.
- ——— (1999). Against the Wind: Memoir of a Radical Christian. Minneapolis: Fortress Press. ISBN 0-8006-3079-3.
- ——— (2001). The Silent Cry: Mysticism and Resistance. Minneapolis: Fortress Press. ISBN 0-8006-3266-4.
- ——— (2007). The Mystery of Death. Translated by Lukens-Rumscheidt, Nancy; Lukens-Rumscheidt, Martin. Minneapolis: Fortress Press.

For publications in German language see de:Dorothee Sölle#Literatur

== Texts in music ==
- The musician Sergio Pinto converted Sölle's poems Credo für die Erde and Ich dein Baum, into musical compositions which were published by Verlag in 2008 under the title entwurf. The CD recording was performed by the band Grupo Sal.
- The composer Ludger Stühlmeyer converted Sölle's poems Kreuzigen and Atem Gottes hauch mich an into musical compositions as well. The vocal and organ arrangements were commissioned by a circle of friends of the Evangelische Akademie Tutzing; the work was first performed in April 2013 and included a reading by Ursula Baltz-Otto during a commemoration of the 10th anniversary of the death of Dorothee Sölle.

== See also ==
- Johann Baptist Metz
