= Gutendorf =

- Village of Bad Berka
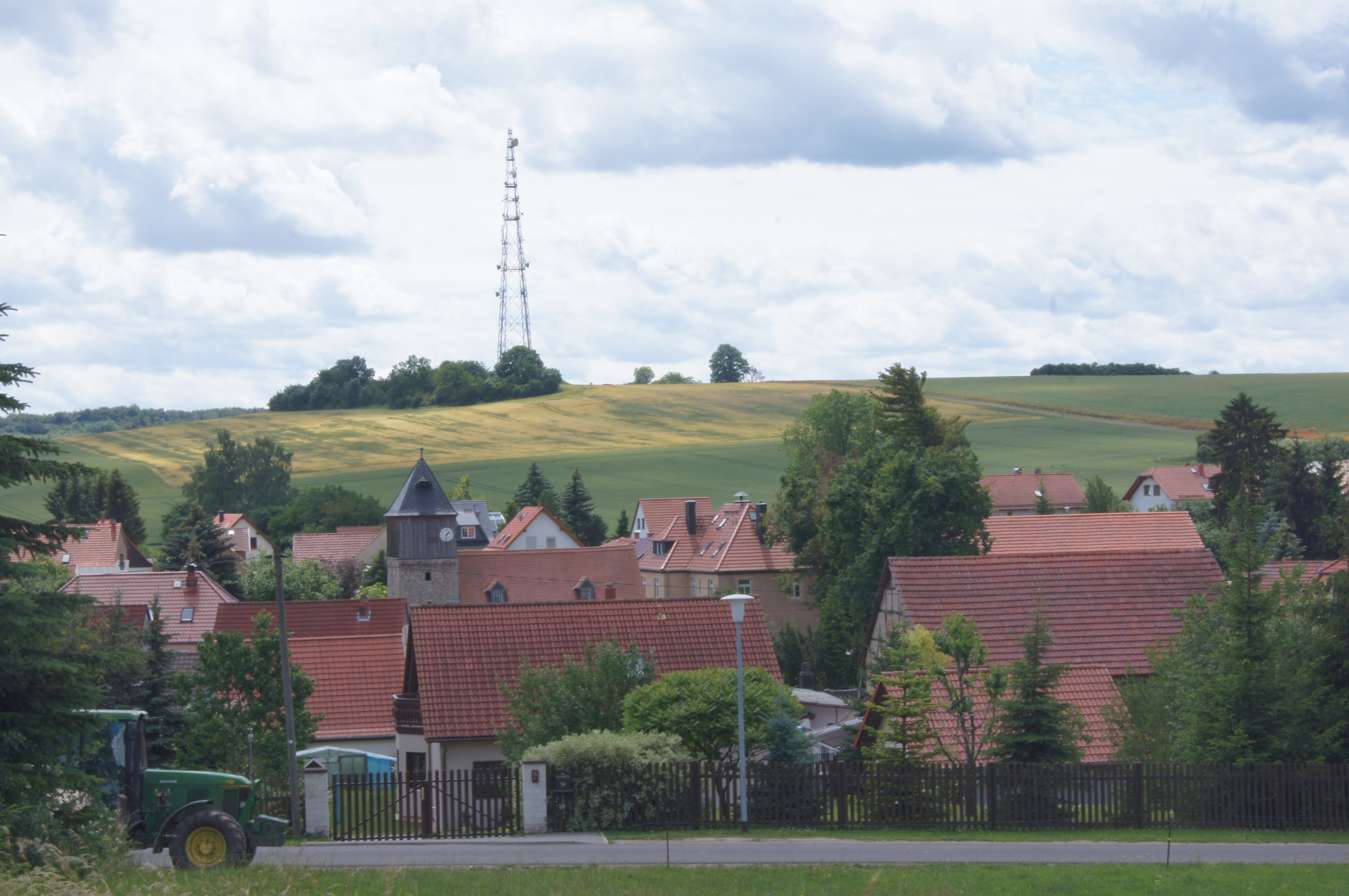
- Interactive map of Gutendorf
- Location within Germany Location within Thuringia
- Coordinates: 50°55′12″N 11°12′39″E
- Country: Germany
- State: Thuringia
- District: Weimarer Land
- Town: Bad Berka

Area
  - Total: 3.68 km^{2} (1.42 sq mi)
- Elevation: 420 m (1,380 ft)

Population (2007-12-31)
  - Total: 225
  - Density: 61.1/km^{2} (158/sq mi)
- Time zone: UTC+01:00 (CET)
  - Summer (DST): UTC+02:00 (CEST)
- Postal codes: 99438
- Dialling codes: 036209
- Vehicle registration: AP

Gutendorf is a former municipality in the Weimarer Land district of Thuringia, Germany. Since 1 December 2008, it is part of Bad Berka.
