= Hans Carl Nipperdey =

Hans Carl Nipperdey (21 January 1895 in Berka – 21 November 1968 in Cologne) was a German labour law expert who worked as the president of the Federal Labour Court from 1954 to 1963. He was a controversial figure because of his complicit work with the Nazi government from 1933, his membership of the Academy for German Law, and his work to systematise Nazi labour laws through his commentaries with Alfred Hueck.

== Biography ==
Nipperdey became a professor of labour law in 1925 at the University of Cologne. His work represented the conservative wing of labour law practice, joining criticism of Hugo Sinzheimer's early texts. In 1933, he joined a protest against the dismissal of Hans Kelsen from the university faculty. He also collaborated in drawing up a list of Jewish students in the faculty.

Nipperdey joined the Nazi Academy for German Law when it was founded in 1933. He and Alfred Hueck wrote commentaries for the new Nazi labour laws, which had abolished trade unions and codetermination from 1934 onwards.

After the Second World War, Nipperdey rejoined the mainstream, and continued his work as a legal academic. In 1954 he was appointed by the conservative CDU government to become the president of the Federal Labour Court. During his time there he issued restrictive decisions on the right to take strike action, and refused to acknowledge that employees had any rights to their pension savings beyond the scope of the contract agreed with an employer.

Hans Carl Nipperdey was the father of the historian Thomas Nipperdey and the liberation theologian Dorothee Sölle.

== Publications ==
- Festschrift für Justus Wilhelm Hedemann zum sechzigsten Geburtstag am 24. April 1938. / Hrsg.: Roland Freisler; George Anton Löning; Hans Carl Nipperdey. Jena: 1938
- Die Pflicht des Gefolgsmannes zur Arbeitsleistung, in: Deutsches Arbeitsrecht 1938
- Alfred Hueck; Hans Carl Nipperdey; Rolf Dietz. Gesetz zur Ordnung der nationalen Arbeit, Kommentar. 4. Aufl. München und Berlin 1943
- Die Ersatzansprüche für Schäden, die durch den von den Gewerkschaften gegen das geplante Betriebsverfassungsgesetz geführten Zeitungsstreik vom 27.-29. Mai 1952 entstanden sind. Rechtsgutachten, Schriftenreihe der Bundesvereinigung der Deutschen Arbeitgeberverbände Heft 9, Köln 1953
- Soziale Marktwirtschaft und Grundgesetz, Heymann, Köln, 1961
- Grundrechte und Privatrecht, Kreefeld 1961
