= Tom F. Driver =

American theologian (1925–2021)

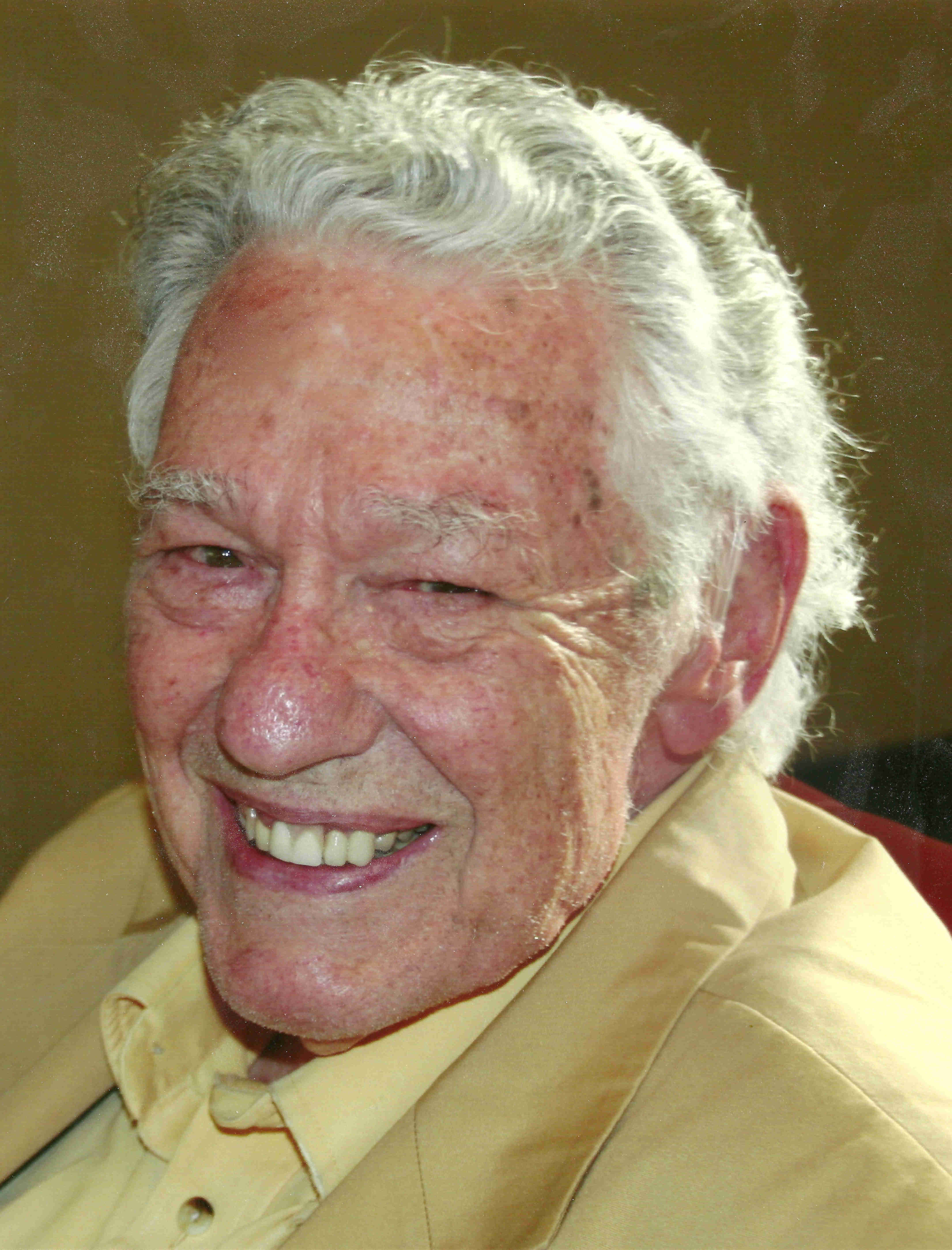
- Driver in 2014
- Born: Tom Faw Driver; May 31, 1925; Johnson City, Tennessee, U.S.
- Died: July 12, 2021 (aged 96)
- Title: Paul J. Tillich Professor of Theology and Culture Emeritus
- Spouse: Anne L. Barstow (m. 1952)
- Children: Kate Driver Murphy; Paul Barstow Driver; Susannah Driver Barstow

Academic background
- Education: Duke University; Union Theological Seminary; Columbia University
- Thesis: The Sense of History in Greek and Shakespearean Drama (1957)

Academic work
- Institutions: Union Theological Seminary
- Doctoral students: Carter Heyward

Tom Faw Driver (May 31, 1925 – July 12, 2021) was a theologian, preacher, lecturer, author, and peace activist. He is best known for his combined interest in theology, theater, and ritual studies. Tom F. Driver is also known for his numerous publications and lectures on similar topics, which range from academic and popular articles to sermons and books. These culminate in works that condemn war and advocate justice. Driver was also the photographer and director of two documentary films about the violence in Colombia, both of which were written and narrated in collaboration with his wife, historian Anne L. Barstow. Since his retirement from teaching (1991), Driver has actively been included in a number of projects that promote peace, justice, and human rights in Haiti and Colombia. He has advocated nonviolent resistance to evil, as well as the rejection of war. In 2014, Tom and his wife were the first recipients of the annual Anne Barstow and Tom Driver Award for Excellence in Nonviolent Action in Retirement, given by the Presbyterian Peace Fellowship.

== Early life ==
Tom F. Driver was born on May 31, 1925, in Johnson City, TN. When he was five years old, his family moved to Bristol, TN-VA. From an early age, he showed great interest in both church and theater. During the Second World War in 1943, he finished high school and was then drafted in the Army of the United States by his father, who was the head of the local draft board. Driver spent the rest of World War II in uniform, mostly in the Corps of Engineers in Europe. By the time he was honorably discharged in the spring of 1946, he had become staunchly opposed to both war and militarism.

== Career ==
Driver’s lifelong advocacy of peace and justice was influenced by the war and his war experience. He was also influenced by his involvement in the United Methodist Church youth movement, while he was a college student. Enrolling at Duke University, a Methodist school, he joined the World Federalists Movement, a democratic movement of the world's citizens and the Fellowship of Reconciliation, an international body made up of religious organizations in support of nonviolence. His experiences at Duke continued to develop his engagement in theology as an underpinning of peace and justice.

While in college, Driver was also active in the Duke Players, the Wesley Foundation, Pi Kappa Phi fraternity, and eventually both Omicron Delta Kappa and Phi Beta Kappa. His roles for the Duke Players group included The Glass Menagerie (playing the Gentleman Caller), Angel Street (playing Mr. Manningham), and Julius Caesar (playing Mark Antony). In his senior year, he founded The Wesley Players, launching it with productions of A Child is Born, by Stephen Vincent Benet, and Aria da Capo, by Edna St. Vincent Millay.

After graduating from Duke in 1950, Driver enrolled for the Bachelor of Divinity (BD) program (later known as the Master of Divinity or MDiv program) at Union Theological Seminary in New York, where he studied under Paul Tillich, Reinhold Niebuhr, James Muilenburg, and others. He was ordained to the Christian ministry by the Holston Conference of the United Methodist Church in 1953. Meanwhile, in 1952, he married Anne Barstow of Palatka, FL, whose lifelong Presbyterianism would bring Driver into frequent affiliation with Presbyterian churches and into active work with the Presbyterian Peace Fellowship. Both served on its National Council. Barstow herself became a historian. The couple, both professors in higher education, are the parents of three children — two daughters and one son.

Driver received a Kent Fellowship in 1953 that enabled him to enter the Ph.D. program in the Department of English and Comparative Literature at Columbia University with a concentration in the history of theater and drama. He received his doctorate in 1957 with a dissertation soon published as The Sense of History in Greek and Shakespearean Drama.

Holding advanced degrees in both theology and theater, Driver was uncertain what his future might hold. His multifaceted career began to take shape in August 1956. Within a single week, he received two offers of jobs: from Union Theological Seminary, he received an invitation to help initiate a Program in Religious Drama that was being funded by the Rockefeller Brothers Fund, while from The Christian Century, a weekly magazine with national circulation, he received an invitation to become its first-ever theater critic. At the seminary, he worked under the drama program's Visiting Director, E. Martin Browne, best known as the director of all the plays of T. S. Eliot in London and New York. During the life of the Religious Drama program, Driver directed the first New York City production of David, a play by D. H. Lawrence, as well as an abbreviated version of The Caucasian Chalk Circle, by Bertolt Brecht.

Driver's theater criticism began to appear in 1952 with articles in the motive magazine, a publication of the Methodist Student Movement. This led to his appointment in 1956 as the first-ever theater critic for The Christian Century Magazine through which he gained national recognition. He also reviewed plays for The New Republic, became the first-night theater critic for station WBAI-FM in New York, and in 1963 the theater critic for The Reporter Magazine (see below), meanwhile writing numerous articles having to do with literature and theater in other magazines and journals. In this period, he also lectured widely and gave sermons in colleges and universities throughout the United States.

Also in 1956, Driver was commissioned by the Methodist Student Movement to write the libretto for an oratorio, The Invisible Fire, about the life of John Wesley, the founder of Methodism, and his brother, the hymnodist Charles Wesley. The oratorio was premiered on January 1, 1957, at Lawrence, Kansas, by the Cincinnati Symphony Orchestra under the direction of Thor Johnson. Invisible Fire was also performed on CBS TV on May 25, 1958, by the CBS Symphony Orchestra with soloists and chorus conducted by Alfredo Antonini.

By 1958, Driver had become an Assistant Professor of Christian Theology at Union Seminary. He would eventually become the Paul J. Tillich Professor of Theology and Culture.

Driver’s 1960 interview in Paris with the author, Samuel Beckett, was published in 1961 as “Beckett by the Madeleine” and has been much anthologized.

The Reporter (magazine) hired Driver as its theater critic in 1963, starting with a review of Peter Brooke’s celebrated London production of King Lear. The association ended in less than a year (in the spring of 1964) when Driver ran afoul of the magazine’s founder and publisher, Max Ascoli, by writing a favorable review of James Baldwin’s Broadway play, Blues for Mister Charlie. Mr. Ascoli, an early publisher, and advocate of Baldwin’s work had turned against Baldwin when the latter published The Fire Next Time, a book about black anger at white supremacy. Ascoli thought Baldwin’s defense of that anger was unjustified and he refused to let his magazine endorse a Baldwin play. Thus rejected, Driver’s review was soon published by three other journals: Christianity and Crisis, The Village Voice, and Negro Digest.

Upon leaving The Reporter magazine, Driver turned his attention to writing a history of the modern theater that he had been commissioned to write for the Dell Publishing Co. It was published in 1970 as Romantic Quest and Modern Query: A History of the Modern Theater. That work superseded a projected work on “Imagination and Revelation,” for which he was awarded a Guggenheim Fellowship in 1962. Meanwhile, Driver served on the editorial board of Christianity and Crisis from 1960 until 1965, when he resigned because of the magazine’s reluctance to condemn the Vietnam War. However, Driver continued to write articles for its pages almost until it ceased publication in 1993.

The polarization of American society was acute during the 1960s, especially in academic institutions. Driver’s political thought moved towards that of the “New Left”. A devoted Protestant Christian throughout his life, he nevertheless became critical of much traditional theology and practice. Although never a parish minister, he was a frequent and eloquent preacher.

During the 1960s, Driver’s theater interests were drawn towards offerings off-Broadway, particularly to the avant-garde of the time and its participational forms of theater. In the classroom, he developed highly participational modes of teaching. These tendencies resulted in his first theological book, Patterns of Grace: Human Experience as Word of God (1977), followed by Christ in a Changing World: Toward an Ethical Christology (1981).

Driver’s twin interests in theater and theology led over time to the study of ritual. He saw that both religion and theater involve the public performance of symbolic actions. Both are present in all human societies. Ritual is not only a preserver of society but also, at various times, a resource for its transformation. Driver contributed to organizing the Ritual Studies Group of the American Academy of Religion; which helped to formalize the study of religious ritual in U.S. universities and seminaries. The Ritual study Group led Driver to a short period of research in the highlands of Papua New Guinea in the summer of 1976. The photographs and audio recordings he made there were later presented at the American Museum of Natural History in New York as well as in classroom teaching.

Driver’s thinking about ritual eventuated in the book, The Magic of Ritual: Our Need for Liberating Rites That Transform Our Lives and Our Communities (1991), later revised and re-published as Liberating Rites: Understanding the Transformative Power of Ritual (1998, 2006).

In 1982, Driver did research in Haiti, focused on the ritual life of Vodou, the country’s popular religion. Nine years later, in 1991, his retirement from teaching coincided with a coup d'état against Haiti’s first democratically elected president, Jean-Bertrande Aristide. Driver became an active supporter of Haiti’s beleaguered democratic movement, working with Witness for Peace, for whom he chaired a Task Force on Haiti, leading numerous fact-finding delegations there between 1991 and 2004. Witness for Peace is a grassroots U.S. organization promoting peace, justice, and sustainable economies in the Americas, including the Caribbean.

Witness for Peace also took Driver to Colombia in 2000, where he was the photographer for a documentary film entitled Colombia, the Next Vietnam? He returned to Colombia in 2003 with a delegation arranged by his wife, Anne Barstow, and sponsored by Witness for Peace and the Presbyterian Peace Fellowship. Once again, he photographed and edited a documentary film, this one known as Colombians Speak Out about Violence and U.S. Policy. Like the first Colombia film, it was co-authored and narrated jointly with Anne Barstow. It was screened at the 2004 Mountaintop Human Rights Film Festival in Vermont.

As an advocate of nonviolent action, as an alternative to war and militarism, Professor Driver edited and wrote the Introduction to a special issue of Church and Society in 2001, a journal published by the Presbyterian Church (USA) entitled Rethinking War, Rethinking Peace, Making Peace. In 2005, in the wake of the disclosure of the use of torture by American military personnel at the Abu Ghraib prison in Iraq, he helped write “What's at Stake in Torture? Ritual, Imagination, and the Role of Media in the Construction of State Power.”

== Retirement ==
In 2011, after living 61 years in New York City, Driver moved with his wife to a retirement community in New Jersey. There, in 2017, he became the founding chairperson of Senior Advocates for Justice, a politically active group in resistance to the Presidential administration that began that year. He drafted the group’s Dream for America. Driver continued to write, lecture, and preach. Driver’s papers and photos are archived at the Burke Library of Union Theological Seminary in New York; see the Finding Aid.

== Awards and honors ==
- D.Litt. (honorary degree), Denison University, 1970
- Omicron Delta Kappa
- Phi Beta Kappa
- Kent Fellowship, 1953
- Guggenheim Fellowship, 1962
- Excellence in Ritual Studies award of the American Academy of Religion, 2001
- The Andrew Murray Award of The Witherspoon Society (shared with Anne L. Barstow), 2006
- The Anne Barstow and Tom Driver Award for Excellence in Nonviolent Action in Retirement, given by The Presbyterian Peace Fellowship, 2014

== Visiting professorships and lectures ==
- Barnard College
- Columbia University
- Doshisha University, Kyoto, Japan
- Fordham University
- Montclair State University
- University of Otago, Dunedin, New Zealand

== Publications ==
=== Books ===
1958 The Invisible Fire. Libretto for oratorio, with music by Cecil Effinger. New York: H.W. Gray Co.

1960 The Sense of History in Greek and Shakespearean Drama. New York: Columbia University Press. Paperback edition, 1967.

1964 Poems of Doubt and Belief: An Anthology of Modern Religious Poetry. Co-edited with Robert Pack New York: Macmillan Co.

1966 Jean Genet. New York: Columbia University Press.

1970 Romantic Quest and Modern Query: A History of the Modern Theater. New York: Delacorte Press. Paperback edition, A Delta Book, 1971. Reprinted at Lanham, MD: University Press of America, 1980.

1977 Patterns of Grace: Human Experience as Word of God. San Francisco: Harper & Row. Reprinted at Lanham, MD: University Press of America, 1985.

1981 Christ in a Changing World: Toward an Ethical Christology. New York: Crossroad Publishing Co.

1991 The Magic of Ritual: Our Need for Liberating Rites that Transform Our Lives and Our Communities. San Francisco: HarperSanFrancisco.

1998 <2007> Liberating Rites: Understanding the Transformative Power of Ritual. Boulder, CO: Westview Press (reissue of The Magic of Ritual, with new Preface and new title).

=== Films ===
- Colombia, the Next Vietnam? (2000)
- Colombians Speak Out about Violence and U.S. Policy (2003)

=== Articles ===
In addition to the theater reviews that appeared in The Christian Century magazine between 1956 and 1962, Tom F. Driver has authored more than 200 articles for the following publications (among others):

- America
- Christian Thought
- Christianity and Crisis
- Church & Society
- Clio
- Columbia University Forum
- Commonweal
- Congress Monthly
- Critical Review of Books in Religion
- Crossroads
- Educational Theater Review
- Haïti Progrès
- International Journal of Religious Education
- Journal of the American Academy of Religion
- motive
- Newsday
- Newsletter of the North American Paul Tillich Society
- Oxymoron: The Arts and Sciences Annual
- Reform Judaism
- Religious Studies News
- Review of Religious Research
- Saturday Review
- Shakespeare Quarterly
- SHOFAR
- Social Action
- Soundings
- The Baltimore Sun
- The Christian Century
- The Christian Scholar
- The Encyclopedia of Religion
- The Living Pulpit
- The Nation
- The New Republic
- The New York Times Book Review
- Review of Religious Research
- Theatre Symposium
- Theology Today
- Tulane Drama Review
- Union Seminary Quarterly Review
- United Methodist Reporter
- Women’s Studies Quarterly

== Family, residence, and contact information ==
Married (1952) to historian Anne L. Barstow, they have three children: Kate Driver Murphy, Paul Barstow Driver, and Susannah Driver Barstow. They have three grandsons and one granddaughter.
