= Journal of the Society of Christian Ethics =

- Discipline: Christian ethics
- Language: English
- Edited by: KC Choi and MT Dávila

Publication details
- Former name(s): Annual of the Society of Christian Ethics
- History: 1981–present
- Publisher: Philosophy Documentation Center (United States)
- Frequency: Biannual

Standard abbreviations
- ISO 4: J. Soc. Christ. Ethics

Indexing
- ISSN: 1540-7942 (print); 2326-2176 (web)
- LCCN: 2002-212916
- JSTOR: jsocichriethi
- OCLC no.: 50146407

Links
- Journal homepage; Online access

The Journal of the Society of Christian Ethics is a biannual peer-reviewed academic journal, sponsored by the Society of Christian Ethics, that examines social, economic, political, and cultural problems within the context of Christian social ethics. It was established in 1981 as The Annual of the Society of Christian Ethics and was reorganized as a journal in 2002. For many years, the journal was published by Georgetown University Press. Since 2019 it has been published in print and electronic formats by the Philosophy Documentation Center.

== Abstracting and indexing ==
The journal is abstracted and indexed in the following bibliographic databases:

- Arts and Humanities Citation Index
- Atla Religion Database
- Current Contents/Arts & Humanities
- ERIH PLUS
- The Philosopher's Index
- Religious and Theological Abstracts
- Scopus

== See also ==
- List of ethics journals
