= Henry Augustus Siebrecht =

American horticulturast (1849–1934)

- Born: 1849
- Died: June 19, 1934 (aged 84–85); New Rochelle, New York
- Education: University of Göttingen
- Occupations: Floral designer, horticulturist, landscape architect

Henry Augustus Siebrecht (1849 – June 19, 1934) was a German immigrant to America who used his early horticultural training to become one of the top floral designers and horticulturalists in the United States.

Siebrecht is credited with having been the first florist to grow lilies of the valley in the winter in a greenhouse process he introduced in 1889. He was also credited with bringing the orchid into commercial use, which he introduced into wedding bouquets in the 1870s, and bringing Japanese and Chinese ginkgo trees into popularity.

== Early career ==
In 1866, 17-year-old Siebrecht arrived in Hoboken, New Jersey. Due to the horticultural training he had received at the University of Göttingen he immediately found a job at Buchanan's nursery in Astoria, Queens. Just two years later Siebrecht had his own florist shop in Manhattan and was creating some of America's first and finest floral bouquets. He established another two stores along Manhattan's upscale Fifth Avenue. As the pioneering florist in the then-residential area above 23rd Street, Siebrecht earned the informal title as the "Father of Fifth Avenue." His neighbors and customers included such notables as Russell Sage, Andrew Carnegie, J. Pierpont Morgan, Ulysses Grant, P.T. Barnum and Boss Tweed. Many became lifelong clients and friends.

== Rose Hill Nurseries ==
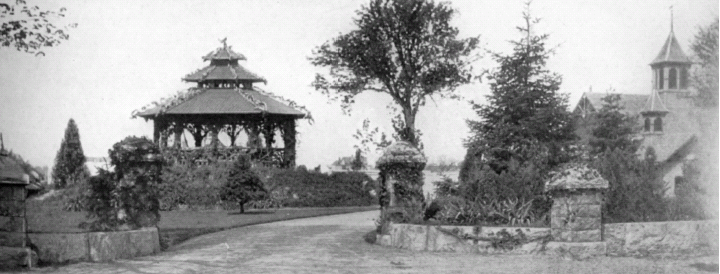
Entrance to Rose Hill Nurseries

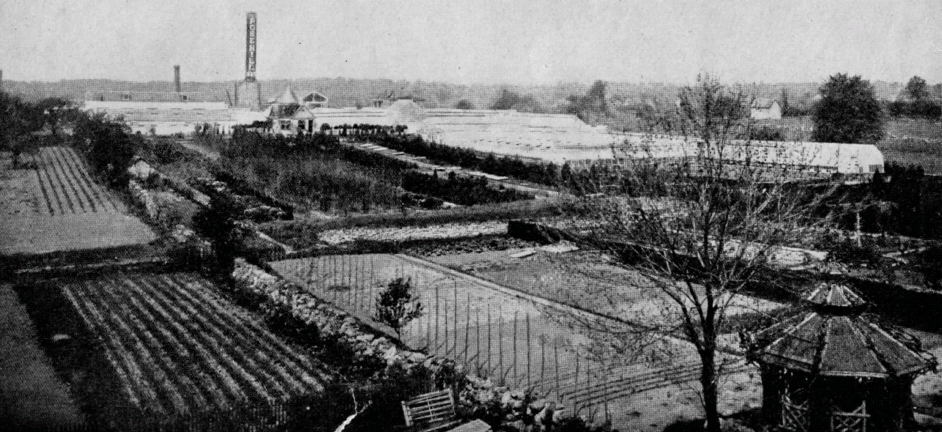
Rose Hill Nurseries

By 1878 Siebrecht had purchased 40 acres in the Wykagyl section of New Rochelle, New York, for a nursery. Formerly the Ranaud-Seacord property on North Avenue, his initial parcel extended to the Hutchinson River. Its southern boundary paralleled the avenue that today bears the name of his nurseries, "Rose Hill". After having purchased another adjacent estate his holdings reached almost 90 acres. 68 enormous hothouses were built within which Siebrecht and his partner grew an array of rare plants.

"It was a City of Glass," F.J. Logan recalled in a 1970 Standard Star article. "As far as anyone could see were greenhouses". Inside the 68 enormous hothouses grew flowers that were never seen before in America. With a partner by the name of Wadley, Siebrecht also maintained a large nursery in Dabadie, Trinidad where precious tropical plants were cultivated for their New York and Newport, RI shops and Rose Hill Nursery, including the "Killarney rose", winter-blooming lilies of the valley and species of orchids.

In 1890, Siebrecht built a large shingle style residence on the north side of "The Lawn" in the planned community of Rochelle Park.

== Later years ==
Siebrecht worked with Nathaniel Britten in laying-out and building what is now known as the New York Botanical Garden. In addition to the Bronx gardens, he also helped plan the extensive Fairmount Park in Philadelphia and to develop Coney Island into a pleasure resort. Siebrecht turned the first shovel of dirt for P.T. Barnum's "Hippodome" at 27th Street and Fourth Avenue in Manhattan and designed Barnum's subsequent Gilmore Gardens.

World's Fairs in New York and Chicago, the Philadelphia Centennial and the San Francisco Fair were landscaped by Siebrecht. Among his long list of notable private gardens were those of Thomas Edison in New Jersey and John D. Rockeller Sr. at Pocantico Hills.

== Personal life ==
Siebrecht was also a very industrious member of his community in New Rochelle. When New Rochelle was incorporated as a city in 1899, he was one of the first eight aldermen. Later, as a member of City Council, he was dubbed the "Father of North Avenue," having been responsible for widening North Street to become North Avenue. He was also a member of the Huguenot and Historical Society.

In 1923 Siebrecht dismantled his renowned nurseries, reestablishing a fraction of them in Boynton, Florida. In the late 1920s a former employee of Rose Hill Nurseries purchased the name for his own enterprise. Siebrecht died on June 19, 1934, in his apartment at "The Grassmere", at 35 May Street in New Rochelle.
