= Roger L. Shinn =

- Born: January 6, 1917; Germantown, Ohio, U.S.
- Died: May 13, 2013 (aged 96); Southbury, Connecticut, U.S.
- Education: Heidelberg University; Union Theological Seminary
- Spouse: Katharine Cole
- Children: 2

Roger L. Shinn (January 6, 1917 - May 13, 2013) was an American theologian. He was a dean and acting president of the Union Theological Seminary, and the author of many books.

== Works ==
- Christianity and the Problem of History (New York; Scribner, 1953)
