= Rebecca Todd Peters =

American feminist and social ethicist

Rebecca Todd Peters is a feminist and social ethicist who serves as a professor of Religious Studies at Elon University. Peters' scholarship focuses on questions related to economics, the environmental crisis, globalization, poverty, and women's access to abortion.

== Education and career ==
Peters received her B.A. in Art and English from Rhodes College and her M.Div. and Ph.D. in Christian Social Ethics from Union Theological Seminary in New York. She was also ordained as a Presbyterian Church (U.S.A.) minister and worked in the PCUSA national office of Women's Ministries for six years.

Peters is the past President of the American Academy of Religion, Southeast Region, and was Elon University's 2011–12 Distinguished Scholar. She also served as the Founding Director of the Poverty and Social Justice program at Elon.

== Publications ==
Her books include:

- In Search of the Good Life: The Ethics of Globalization (Continuum, 2004), which won the 2003 Trinity Book Prize.
- Justice in a Global Economy: Strategies for Home, Community and World (Westminster/John Knox, 2006)
- To Do Justice: A Guide for Progressive Christians (Westminster/John Knox, 2008)
- Solidarity Ethics: Transformation in a Globalized World (Fortress Press, 2014)
- Trust Women: A Progressive Christian Argument for Reproductive Justice (Beacon Press, 2018)

Dominican University of California Professor Laura Stivers has stated that in her book Solidarity Ethics, Peters "lays the groundwork... for how we can come together in solidarity across lines of difference to create movements for justice and structural change."

Peters' book Trust Women has been described as offering "a Christian argument for abortion" and as "shifting the conversation [about abortion] to reproductive justice." Cecile Richards, president of the Planned Parenthood Federation of America and president of the Planned Parenthood Action Fund, has said: “In Trust Women, Rebecca Todd Peters lays bare the real question underlying the abortion debate: whether or not women can be trusted to make their own decisions. She is compassionate and clear-eyed in constructing her faith-based case for abortion, and her voice cuts through the noise to affirm what we at Planned Parenthood have long believed: the best arbiter of a woman’s reproductive destiny is herself.”

== Abortion ==
Peters has been widely noted for her framing of abortion as "a moral good."

== Other writing ==
Peters also writes about current events, theology, justice, and social change on her blog, “To Do Justice," on the Patheos website, and her op-eds have been printed in a variety of newspapers on topics including racism and sex education.
