= Iliff =

Iliff may refer to:

- Iliff, Colorado
- Iliff (RTD), a station on the RTD rail system in Aurora, Colorado, United States
- Iliff School of Theology

== People ==
- John Wesley Iliff
- W. Peter Iliff, screenwriter
- Iliff David Richardson
