= Harris Franklin Rall =

American academic and theologian

Harris Franklin Rall (1870 – October 13, 1964) was the first president of Iliff School of Theology in Denver, Colorado after it reopened in 1910 till 1915, and he also served as the Henry White Warren professor of Practical Theology. Rall later became president of Garrett Biblical Institute in Evanston, Illinois, and taught theology there. Rall was active in the social gospel movement, seeking to relate Christianity to the ills of society. Garrett named its lecture series after him.

Rall authored 24 books in the fields of theology and biblical studies including Teachings of Jesus, New Testament History, Christianity, an Inquiry into Its Nature and Truth, and A Working Faith. His work on the teachings of Jesus reflected the values of early liberalism.

Rall died in 1964 at the age of 94.

== Early life and education ==
Harris Franklin Rall was a native of Council Bluffs, Iowa. He had at least one sibling, a brother.

Rall received bachelor's and master's degrees from the University of Iowa. While there, he was elected to the Phi Beta Kappa honor society. He later received a bachelor of divinity degree from Yale University. While studying in Germany, he attended the University of Berlin and received a doctorate from Martin Luther University Halle-Wittenberg.

== Ministerial career ==
From 1900 to 1910, Rall was a Methodist minister in Connecticut and at the Lovely Lane Methodist Church in Baltimore, Maryland.

== Academic career ==
In 1910, he began serving as president of Iliff School of Theology in Denver, Colorado. In 1915, he began teaching at the Garrett Biblical Institute in Evanston, Illinois, and remained there until his retirement in 1955.

== Writing career ==
In the 1930s, Rall edited a quarterly review titled the Garrett Tower. From 1941 to 1957, he wrote a column in the Christian Advocate.

== Personal life ==
Rall and his wife Maud had a daughter named Mary.

Rall died at a hospital in Evanston on October 13, 1964.
