= Daniel Arnold =

Daniel Arnold may refer to:

- Dan Arnold (American football) (born 1995), tight end for the Jacksonville Jaguars
- Daniel A. Arnold (born 1965), American scholar and philosopher
- Daniel Arnold (photographer) (born 1980), New York City photographer
- Daniel Arnold (table tennis) (born 1978), German para table tennis player
- Danny Arnold (1925–1995), American producer, writer, comedian, actor and director
- Danny Arnold (rugby league) (born 1977), Scottish rugby league footballer

== See also ==
- Dani Arnold, Swiss mountaineer
