= David Aune =

American New Testament scholar

David E. Aune
- Born: November 8, 1939 (age 86); Minneapolis, Minnesota, U.S.
- Occupation: New Testament scholar
- Known for: Prophecy in Early Christianity and the Ancient Mediterranean World (1983); Revelation (WBC) (1997-1998)
- Title: Walter Professor of New Testament and Christian Origins

Academic background
- Education: University of Minnesota; University of Chicago
- Doctoral advisor: Robert M. Grant

Academic work
- School or tradition: Lutheran
- Institutions: University of Notre Dame
- Main interests: New Testament; Early Christianity

David Edward Aune (born November 8, 1939) is an American New Testament scholar. He is the emeritus Walter Professor of New Testament and Christian Origins at the University of Notre Dame.

== Life ==
Aune is a member of the Evangelical Lutheran Church in America.

=== Education ===
Aune studied at Wheaton College, Illinois and in 1961 he earned a B.A. In 1963 Auned earned a M.A. granted with high honor in New Testament Language and Literature at the Wheaton Graduate School of Theology with the thesis Paul's Exegesis of the Old Testament as Illustrated by His Quotations in Romans 9-11 under the supervision of A. Berkeley Mickelsen. In 1969 he earned a M.A. in Classical Civilization at the University of Minnesota. From 1970, Aune holds a Ph.D. in New Testament and Early Christian Literature from the University of Chicago with the dissertation The cultic setting of realized eschatology in the early Church supervised by Robert M. Grant.

=== Academic work ===
He taught at Saint Xavier College and Loyola University Chicago before taking up an appointment at the University of Notre Dame. On 21 October 2012 Aune was named honorary president for life of the Chicago Society of Biblical Research.

=== Fellow ===
Aune is a fellow of the Royal Norwegian Society of Sciences and Letters (2001) and of the Norwegian Academy of Science and Letters (2009).

=== Festschrift ===
In 2006, a Festschrift was published in his honor. The New Testament and Early Christian Literature in Greco-Roman Context: Studies in Honor of David E. Aune included contributions from Peder Borgen, Robert M. Grant, and Margaret M. Mitchell.

== Works ==
Aune is the author of numerous books and articles on the New Testament and early Christianity.

=== Theses ===
- Aune, David Edward (1963). Paul's Exegesis of the Old Testament as Illustrated by His Quotations in Romans 9-11 (M.A. thesis, Wheaton Graduate School of Theology).
- Aune, David Edward (1970). The cultic setting of realized eschatology in the early Church (Ph.D. dissertation, University of Chicago). OCLC 79052019.

=== Books ===
- Aune, David E. (1972). The Cultic Setting of Realized Eschatology in Early Christianity. Supplements to Novum Testamentum. Vol. 28. Leiden: E.J. Brill. OCLC 384083.
- ——— (1983). Prophecy in Early Christianity and the Ancient Mediterranean World. Grand Rapids, MI: Eerdmans. ISBN 9780802806352. OCLC 9555379.
- ——— (1987). The New Testament in its Literary Environment. Library of early Christianity. Vol. 8. Philadelphia, PA: Westminster Press. ISBN 9780664219123. OCLC 14069039.
- ——— (1998). Revelation 6-16. Word Biblical Commentary. Vol. 52B. Nashville, TN: Thomas Nelson. ISBN 9780849907869. OCLC 40044246.

=== As editor ===
- ———, ed. (1972). Studies in New Testament and Early Christian Literature; essays in honor of Allen P. Wikgren. Supplements to Novum Testamentum. Vol. 33. Leiden: E.J. Brill. ISBN 9789004035041. OCLC 707874.
- ———, ed. (1988). Greco-Roman Literature and the New Testament: selected forms and genres. Sources for Biblical Study. Vol. 21. Atlanta, GA: Scholars Press. ISBN 9781555402310. OCLC 17258214.
- ———, ed. (2010). The Blackwell Companion to the New Testament. Blackwell Companions to Religion. Chichester, UK & Malden, MA: Wiley-Blackwell. ISBN 9781405108256. OCLC 430678992.
- ———; Brenk, Frederick E., eds. (2012). Greco-Roman Culture and the New Testament: studies commemorating the centennial of the Pontifical Biblical Institute. Supplements to Novum Testamentum. Vol. 143. Leiden: E.J. Brill. ISBN 9789004226548. OCLC 797843303.

=== Articles and chapters ===
- ——— (Summer 1964). "The Text-Tradition of Luke-Acts". Bulletin of the Evangelical Theological Society. 7 (3): 69–82.
- ——— (July–September 1966). "St John's Portrait of the Church in the Apocalypse". The Evangelical Quarterly. 38 (3): 131–149. doi:10.1163/27725472-03803002. S2CID 251652447.
- ——— (1972). "The Phenomenon of Early Christian "anti-Sacramentalism"". In ——— (ed.). Studies in New Testament and Early Christian Literature; essays in honor of Allen P. Wikgren. Supplements to Novum Testamentum. Vol. 33. Leiden: E.J. Brill. pp. 194–214. ISBN 9789004035041. OCLC 707874.
- ——— (July–September 1973). "A Note of Jesus' Messianic Consciousness and 11Q Melchizadek". Evangelical Quarterly. 45 (3): 161–165. doi:10.1163/27725472-04503004. S2CID 251870336.
- ——— (1988). "Greco-Roman Biography". In ——— (ed.). Greco-Roman Literature and the New Testament: selected forms and genres. Sources for Biblical Study. Vol. 21. Atlanta, GA: Scholars Press. pp. 107-126. ISBN 9781555402310. OCLC 17258214.
- ——— (2012). "The Polyvalent Imagery of Rev 3:20 in the Light of Greco-Egyptian Divination Texts". In ———; Brenk, Frederick E. (eds.). Greco-Roman Culture and the New Testament: studies commemorating the centennial of the Pontifical Biblical Institute. Supplements to Novum Testamentum. Vol. 143. Leiden: E.J. Brill. pp. 197–184. ISBN 9789004226548. OCLC 797843303.
