= McLuney, Ohio =

Unincorporated community in Ohio, U.S.

Coordinates: 39°44′24″N 82°6′0″W

McLuney is an unincorporated community in Perry County, in the U.S. state of Ohio. North of McLuney is Flatiron, a community on the intersection of Flint Ridge Road and School Drive. To the east is the community of Stringtown, at the Ohio State Route 669 and Ceramic Road intersection. McLuney's primary roads include Perry County Road 6 and Ohio State Route 93. It's minor/residential roads include Township Roads 209, 444, 448, 1022, 1180, as well as Jackson Drive (TR 1181) and Mayfair Drive (TR 1182).

== History ==
McLuney was founded in 1855, and named after nearby McLuney Creek. A post office called McLuney was established in 1887, and remained in operation until 1941.

== Notable person ==
John Wesley Iliff, a Colorado rancher, was born at McLuney in 1831.
