= Neotraditionalism (politics) =

Political approach

In politics and sociology, neotraditionalism is an approach using the deliberate application of old practices and institutions, modified to accommodate the modern context (this accommodation contrasts with primordialism).

== Overview and terminology ==
=== Neotradition ===
Neotraditionalists assert that the interaction between the state and society (governance, application of law, etc.) should take into account the cultural memory of the local population. Neotraditions can be invented outright with the purpose of creation of a new group identity thus being useful in the times of rapid changes in the society. As an example, Eric Hobsbawn offers the new Scottish national identity centered around Ossian, kilts, and bagpipes. This identity replaced in the 18th century the old feudal cohesion that was deteriorating under the pressure of urbanization and changes in the class system. Jonathan Friedman suggests that neotraditionalism is the opposite of modernism, rising up in the moments of crisis of the latter (such crises per Friedman are inevitable due to the need of the constant expansion required by modernism to simply maintain the stability). Traditional identity is something that one can rely on in times of crisis, providing an easily accessible set of rules for living and a medium for connection with others.

=== Communist neotraditionalism ===
Political scientists' use of the term varies. In particular, Communist neotraditionalism is used to describe a mix of modern and traditional elements in the USSR and other Communist countries, where the success of an individual to large extent depended on the archaic patron-client relations (including "blat"). The characterization of USSR as neo-traditionalist was pioneered by Ken Jowitt in 1983. A similar approach towards China was taken by Andrew Walder in his "Communist Neo-Traditionalism" (1988), where the communist neotraditionalism was defined as a "distinctly modern" fusion of communist institutions and personal patron/client ties. Matthew Lenoe and Terry Martin made the deep advances in research of the neotraditionalism in application to the Soviet history.

=== Radical neotraditionalism ===
When discussing the politics of religion, radical neotraditionalism is used as a more neutral term to describe the non-Protestant fundamentalism.

== See also ==
- Evangelicalism
- Confessionalism (religion)
- Confessionalism (politics)
- Baal teshuva
- Islamic neo-traditionalism

== Sources ==
- Dennis Galvan, neotraditionalism (political science and sociology) at the Encyclopædia Britannica
- David-Fox, Michael (3 July 2015). Crossing Borders: Modernity, Ideology, and Culture in Russia and the Soviet Union. University of Pittsburgh Press. ISBN 978-0-8229-8092-6.
- Riesebrodt, Martin (1998). Pious Passion: The Emergence of Modern Fundamentalism in the United States and Iran. University of California Press. ISBN 978-0-520-07464-4. OCLC 1077847565.
- Lupher, Mark (31 December 2017). "11. Revolutionary Little Red Devils: The Social Psychology of Rebel Youth, 1966–1967". Chinese Views of Childhood. University of Hawaii Press. pp. 321–344. doi:10.1515/9780824861889-015. ISBN 978-0-8248-6188-9.
- Friedman, Jonathan (5 October 1994). Cultural Identity and Global Process. SAGE. pp. 244–. ISBN 978-1-84860-912-9. OCLC 1007860324.
- Galvan, Dennis (2007). "Neotraditionalism". In Mark Bevir (ed.). Encyclopedia of Governance, Volumes 1-2. SAGE. pp. 599–601. ISBN 978-1-4129-0579-4. OCLC 444591316.
