= Donald Messer =

Donald Messer may refer to:

- Donald E. Messer (born 1941), American theologian and author.
- Don Messer (1909–1973), Canadian musician, band leader, and radio broadcaster.
