= Iliff School of Theology =

American Methodist seminary

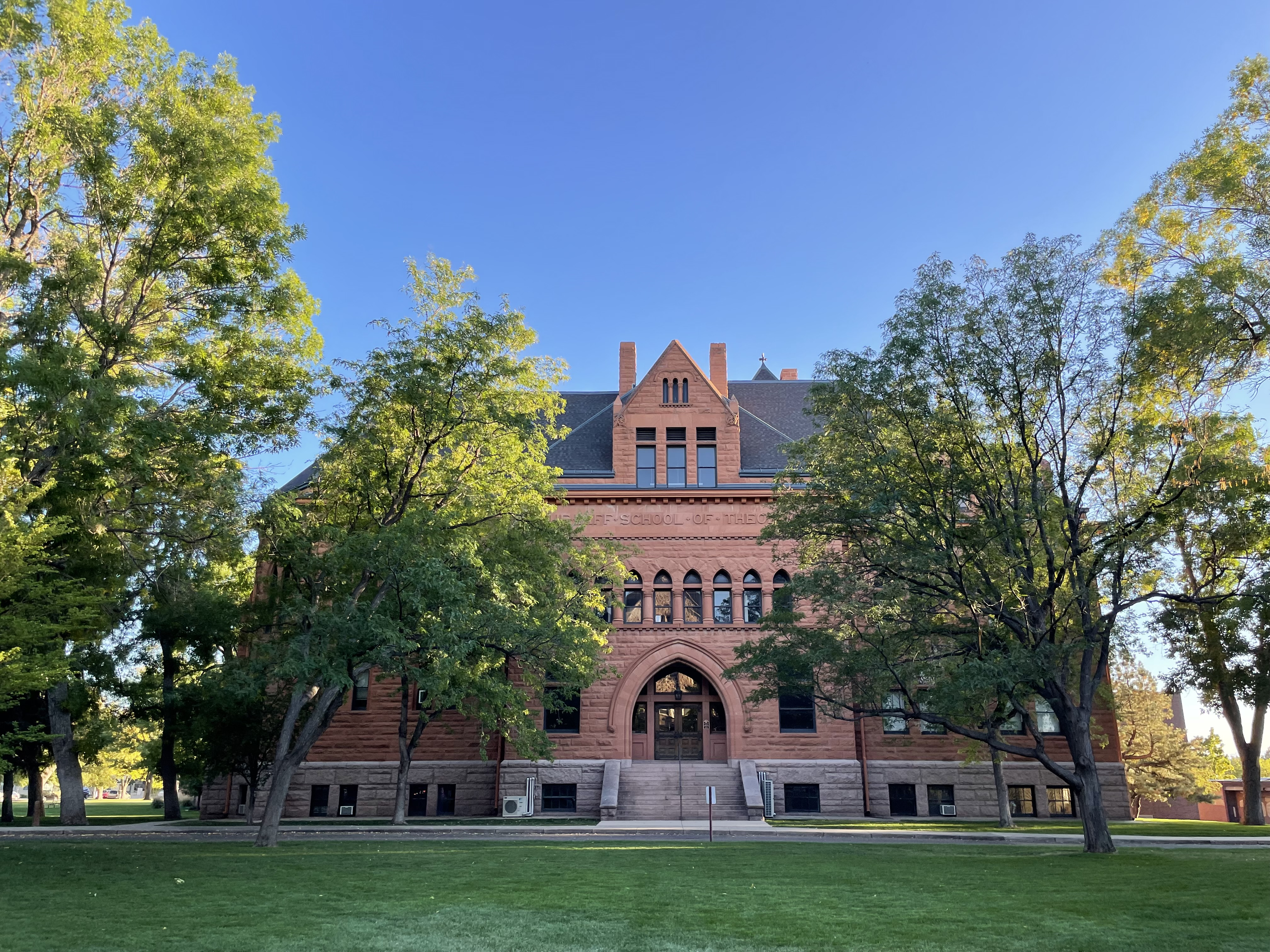
- Iliff Hall, built 1892
- Type: private graduate theological school
- Established: 1892
- Affiliations: United Methodist Church
- Endowment: $49.42 million
- Academic staff: 14 (Fall 2025)
- Students: 154 (104.8 FTE) (Fall 2025)
- Location: Denver, Colorado, United States
- Campus: Urban Adjoins the University of Denver's 125 acre campus
- Colors: Blue
- Website: www.iliff.edu

Iliff School of Theology is a private graduate Methodist theological school in Denver, Colorado. Founded in 1892, the school's campus is adjacent to the University of Denver.

Iliff is one of thirteen United Methodist Church seminaries in the United States. It also has close connections with the United Church of Christ, the Evangelical Lutheran Church in America, the Unitarian Universalist Association, the Episcopal Church, the Presbyterian Church USA, the Metropolitan Community Church, and others. Iliff's student body represents more than thirty faith traditions, and Iliff aims to recruit, enroll, and retain a student body that is fifty percent Black, Indigenous, and Persons of Color (BIPOC) by the fall of 2024.

Iliff School of Theology is accredited by Association of Theological Schools in the United States and Canada and the Higher Learning Commission.

== History ==
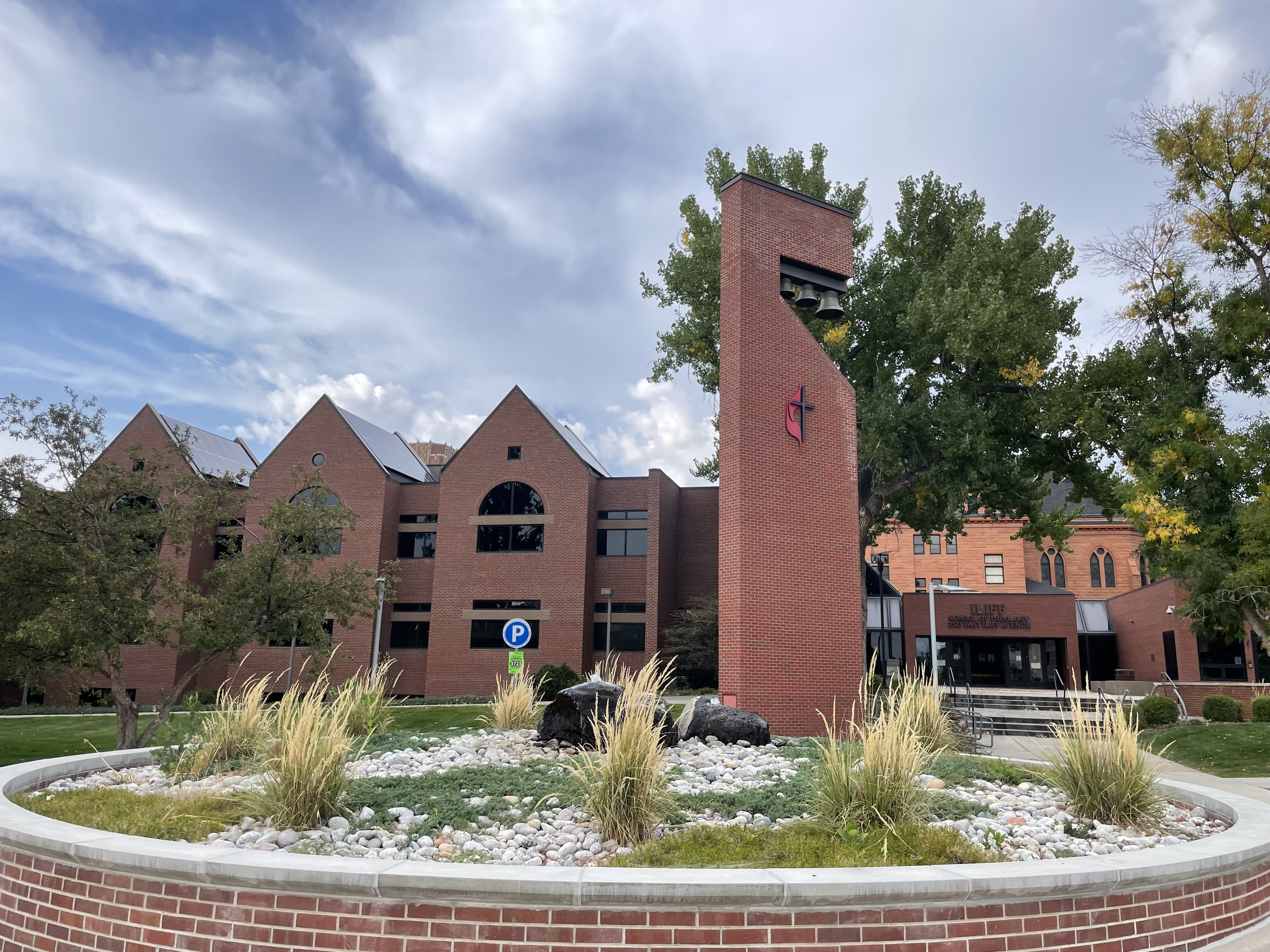
Bell tower and south entrance, Iliff School of Theology, 2021

Iliff was founded in 1889 as a seminary and school of religious studies of the University of Denver. In 1892, it was named the Iliff School of Theology after John Wesley Iliff (1831–1878) who had wanted to establish a school for training ministers in the territory of Colorado. After he died, his wife Elizabeth Iliff Warren and her second husband, Bishop Henry White Warren, succeeded in starting the Iliff School of Theology. The cornerstone of Iliff Hall was laid on June 8, 1892 and construction was completed in 1893. While the construction was taking place, the first classes began on September 23, 1892.

In the summer of 1900, Iliff closed for various financial and organizational reasons. On August 27, 1903, Iliff School of Theology was incorporated as an independent institution, separate from the University of Denver. It reopened on September 10, 1910 as a freestanding school of theology and Methodist seminary.

"In 1893, Iliff School of Theology took into its library a book, given as a gift, written in Latin that is a History of Christianity. It was covered by the skin of a murdered Indian man. It was treasured by the institution and displayed for 80 years in a case outside of the Library. In 1974, under pressure from students, the book was taken out of public view and in the presence of a representative of the American Indian Movement, the skin cover was removed and repatriated. Everyone present that day were sworn to secrecy and required to sign non-disclosure agreements."

In September 1981, Iliff and the University of Denver inaugurated a joint Ph.D. program leading to the Doctor of Philosophy in Religious and Theological Studies.

Iliff has hosted a number of high-profile leaders for special events, including former Secretary of State Madeleine Albright, the Little Rock Nine, and others. From February 24–27, 2008, Iliff honored the Little Rock Nine in a series of events called "A Celebration of Courage."

In 2011, Iliff established "The Courage Award." The award is given out as a means "to acknowledge and celebrate individuals or organizations whose courage, persistence, and determination has changed an unjust situation in the world." The first recipient of this award was Judy Shepard for her work in telling the story of her son, Matthew Shepard.

=== Presidents ===
Presidents of the Iliff School of Theology have included:

- 1910–1915 Harris Franklin Rall
- 1916–1920 James Albert Beebe
- 1921–1924 Edwin Wesley Dunlavy
- 1925–1932 Elmer Guy Cutshall
- 1934–1942 Charles Edwin Schofield
- 1942–1946 Harry T. Morris
- 1947–1952 Edward Randolph Bartlett
- 1953–1961 Harold Ford Carr
- 1962–1969 Lowell Benjamin Swan
- 1969–1981 Smith Jameson Jones, Jr.
- 1981–2000 Donald E. Messer
- 2000–2004 David Maldonado, Jr.
- 2004–2006 J. Philip Wogaman
- 2006–2012 David G. Trickett
- 2012–2013 Albert Hernandez (interim)
- 2013–2023 Thomas V. Wolfe
- 2023-present Lee H. Butler Jr.

== Library ==
The school's library is the Ira J. Taylor Library. In 2008, it claimed to be the largest theological collection in the Rocky Mountain area with approximately 205,800 volumes, 60,600 microforms, and over 900 current periodical and serial subscriptions.

== Notable people ==
=== Alumni ===
- Daniel A. Arnold, Professor of the Philosophy of Religion at the Divinity School of the University of Chicago.
- Nadia Bolz-Weber, Founder and Pastor of House for All Sinners and Saints in Denver, Colorado
- Mark Holland, former mayor of Kansas City, Kansas and 2022 Democratic U.S. Senate nominee from Kansas
- Swanee Hunt, United States Ambassador to Austria (1993–1997); founding director of the Women and Public Policy Program at the Harvard Kennedy School
- Terrance Carroll, Speaker, Colorado House of Representatives.
- Rodger McDaniel, former member of the Wyoming House of Representatives and Wyoming Senate
- Otis Moss III, Pastor of Chicago's Trinity United Church of Christ.
- Andrew S. Park, Korean American Methodist theologian who teaches at United Theological Seminary in Trotwood, Ohio.
- Mary Ann Swenson, American bishop of the United Methodist Church, elected in 1992.
- Carol Voisin, member of the faculty at Southern Oregon University
- Carrie Ann Lucas, lawyer, disability rights advocate, and activist
- Brandan Robertson, writer, activist, and minister.
- Matt Morris (musician), songwriter and former Episcopal priest.

=== Faculty ===
- Miguel A. De La Torre, Professor of Social Ethics
- George Tinker, Clifford Baldridge Professor of American Indian Cultures and Religious Traditions

=== Former faculty ===
- Wallace Clift, Head of Anglican Studies, 1992–2002
- Vincent Harding, Professor Emeritus of Religion and Social Transformation, 1981–2004
- Dennis MacDonald, Theology and Biblical Studies, 1980-1998.
- Donald E. Messer, Henry White Warren Professor of Practical Theology, 1981–2000
