= John Wesley Iliff =

Colorado cattle rancher (1831–1878)

- Born: December 18, 1831; McLuney, Ohio, US
- Died: February 9, 1878 (aged 46)
- Resting place: Fairmount Cemetery
- Spouse: Elizabeth Iliff
- Children: William Seward Iliff; Edna Iliff (1871-1951); Louise Iliff (1875-1966); John Wesley Iliff Jr. (1877-1879)
- Parent(s): Salome Reed, Thomas Iliff

Signature
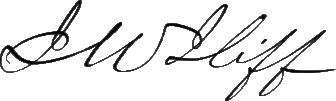

John Wesley Iliff Sr. (December 18, 1831 – February 9, 1878) was a Colorado cattle rancher who is the namesake of the Iliff School of Theology in Denver.

== Biography ==
Iliff was born on December 18, 1831, in McLuney, Ohio to Salome Reed and Thomas Iliff.

He attended Ohio Wesleyan in Delaware, Ohio but did not graduate. In 1857, at the age of twenty-six, his father gave him $500 in cash, and he moved to Ohio City, Kansas, where he opened a retail store. In 1859, gold was discovered in Colorado. He moved to Denver, Colorado to open a new retail store on Blake Street, trading supplies for livestock from new immigrants, then fattening them on the open range and using the profits to buy land in northeast Colorado, creating the largest ranch in Colorado history, where he raised as many as 35,000 heads a year to sell to Union Pacific construction crews, becoming a millionaire known as "the Cattle King of the Plains", leaving his fortune to found Iliff School of Theology.

== Death and legacy ==
He died on February 9, 1878.

When he died, Iliff's empire included 15,558 acres of prime land and 26,000 head of cattle, worth millions today. After Iliff died, his wife personally asked John D. Snyder to take over the entire cattle operation of the estate, which they managed for nearly a decade. He became the largest and most successful cattle entrepreneur the west had ever produced. "No man was ever known on the frontier who had Mr. Iliff's genius for handling cattle and conducting successfully large operations."

The town of Iliff, Colorado was named for him.

Iliff Avenue in Denver and Aurora, Colorado, which goes past the Iliff School of Theology, was named for him.

In 1960, he was inducted into the Hall of Great Westerners of the National Cowboy & Western Heritage Museum.
