= University of Chicago Divinity School =

Private seminary in Chicago

Coordinates: 41°47′19″N 87°36′0.5″W

- Type: Private
- Established: 1856
- Parent institution: University of Chicago
- Dean: James T. Robinson
- Location: 1025 E 58th Street, Chicago, Illinois, US
- Campus: Urban
- Website: divinity.uchicago.edu

The University of Chicago Divinity School is a graduate professional school at the University of Chicago dedicated to the training of academics and clergy across religious boundaries. Formed under Baptist auspices, the school today is without any sectarian affiliation.

It is ranked number one in the field of the study of religion according to the National Research Council's measure of faculty quality in its survey of all doctoral granting programs in religious studies.

Scholarly work is organized by three faculty committees, each of which is further subdivided into areas of study. PhD students concentrate their work in one of eleven recognized areas of study. Students in the various master's programs combine study in these areas with courses specific to their programs. All students are taught by the same faculty.

== History ==
A distinguished Semiticist and a member of the Baptist clergy, Chicago's first university president William Rainey Harper believed that a great research university ought to have as one central occupation the scholarly study of religion, to prepare scholars for careers in teaching and research, and ministers for service to the church. Having taught at what was then the Baptist Theological Union Seminary, Harper incorporated it into the University of Chicago as its Divinity School, the first professional school at the university. The Baptist Theological Union (BTU) had founded the Seminary, established in 1865, "alongside" the Old University of Chicago which opened nine years earlier in 1856. The old university had ceased operations under bankruptcy in 1886, with the exception of its law school which was absorbed by Northwestern University.

The Divinity School is located in Swift Hall, on the main quadrangle of the university's campus in close proximity to the Divisions of the Humanities and the Social Sciences for interdisciplinary work.

== Degrees ==
The University of Chicago Divinity School grants Doctor of Philosophy (Ph.D.), Master of Divinity (M.Div.), Master of Arts (M.A.), and Master of Arts in Religious Studies (A.M.R.S.) degrees. It offers several dual-degree programs with other schools at the University of Chicago.

=== Curriculum ===
Candidates for the Ph.D. choose among eleven areas of academic study: Anthropology and Sociology of Religion, Bible, Buddhist Studies, History of Christianity, History of Judaism, History of Religions, Islamic Studies, Philosophy of Religion, Religion, Literature, and Visual Culture, Religion in America, Religious Ethics and Theology.

Additionally, the Divinity School features a Committee on Constructive Studies in Religion. They are composed by faculty and students, and aim to develop a deeply historical and interdisciplinary understanding of the questions and problems they seek to address, regardless of their area of study There are three Committees of Study: Historical Studies Committee, Literary, Media, and Cultural Studies, and Committee on Social and Cultural Sciences of Religion (SCSR).

== Research and special programs ==
=== The Martin Marty Center for the Public Understanding of Religion ===
The vision of establishing an institute for the advanced study of religion at the University of Chicago came from Joseph M. Kitagawa, the Dean of the Divinity School from 1970 to 1980. Martin E. Marty, a historian of modern Christianity, worked closely with Dean Kitagawa to formulate the purposes and operation of the institute within the context of the Divinity School's general mission of teaching and graduate research. The Institute for the Advanced Study of Religion officially opened in October 1979, with Professor Marty as its director. Subsequent directors have been Bernard McGinn (1983–1992), a historian of medieval Christianity; Frank Reynolds (1992–2000), a historian of religions who specializes in Buddhist studies; W. Clark Gilpin (2001–2004), a historian of American Christianity and theology; Wendy Doniger (2004–2007), a historian of religion who specializes in Hinduism and mythology; and William Schweiker, who works in the field of theological ethics. In 1998, the Institute for the Advanced Study of Religion was renamed the Martin Marty Center, to honor its founding director for his singular distinction as historian, author, and commentator on religion and public life.

=== Buddhist Studies Program ===
A number of faculty in the Divinity School and the humanities departments of South Asian Languages and Civilizations (SALC), East Asian Languages and Civilizations (EALC), History, and Art History participate in an interdisciplinary program in the study of the Buddhist Traditions. Degrees are offered through matriculation in one or the other of these programs. The program sponsors workshops and seminars throughout the academic year. Affiliated faculty include Daniel A. Arnold, Steven Collins, Paul Copp, Matthew Kapstein, James Ketelaar, Gary A. Tubb, and Christian K. Wedemeyer.

=== Awards and Prizes ===
Each year, the Divinity School awards prizes for specific student achievements. These include: the John Gray Rhind Award, to an advanced student in the ministry program at the Divinity School whose excellence in academic and professional training gives notable promise of a significant contribution to the life of the church, and the J. Coert Rylaarsdam Prize, to a student who has made special efforts, curricular or extracurricular, to promote interfaith relations, particularly between the Christian, Jewish, and Muslim traditions. Additionally, the school awards a prize for Frederick Buechner Award for Excellence in Writing. The school also awards the Divinity School Prize for Excellence in Teaching, to recognise the efforts of doctoral students in their teaching, and the Tikva Frymer-Kensky Memorial Prize, for a student who has written the most accomplished essay integrating the materials and insights of at least two of the fields to which Professor Frymer-Kensky's own scholarship contributed: Hebrew Bible, biblical law, ancient Near Eastern studies, and ritual and/or feminist theology.

== Swift Hall ==
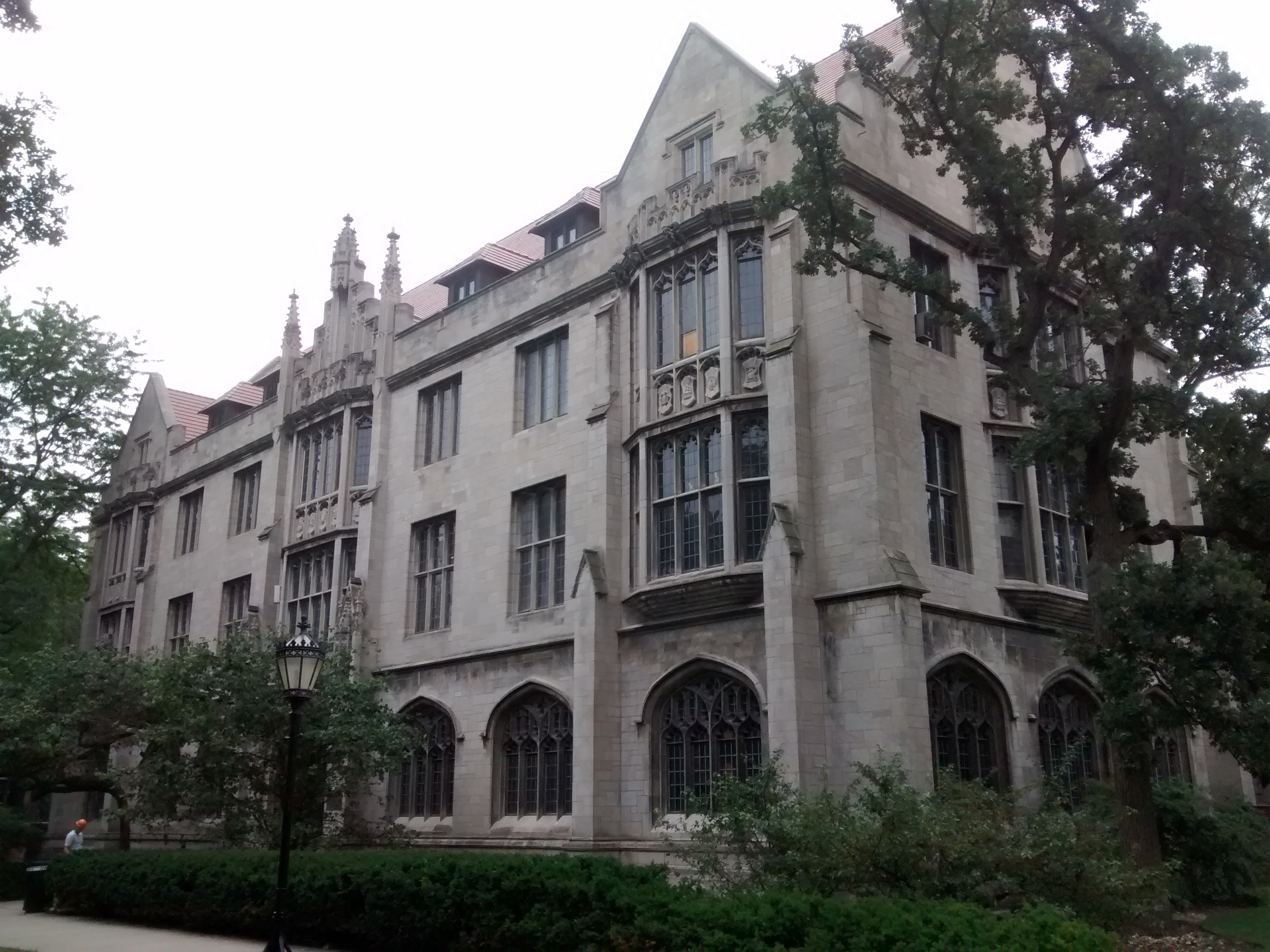
Swift Hall

Completed in 1926, Swift Hall was designed by Coolidge and Hodgdon in the collegiate Gothic style of architecture. It contains lecture halls, seminar rooms, faculty offices, a student-run coffee shop, a commons, and administrative offices. The lecture hall was formerly the home of the Divinity Library, before its holdings were consolidated into the central research library, the Joseph Regenstein Library.

== Bond Chapel ==
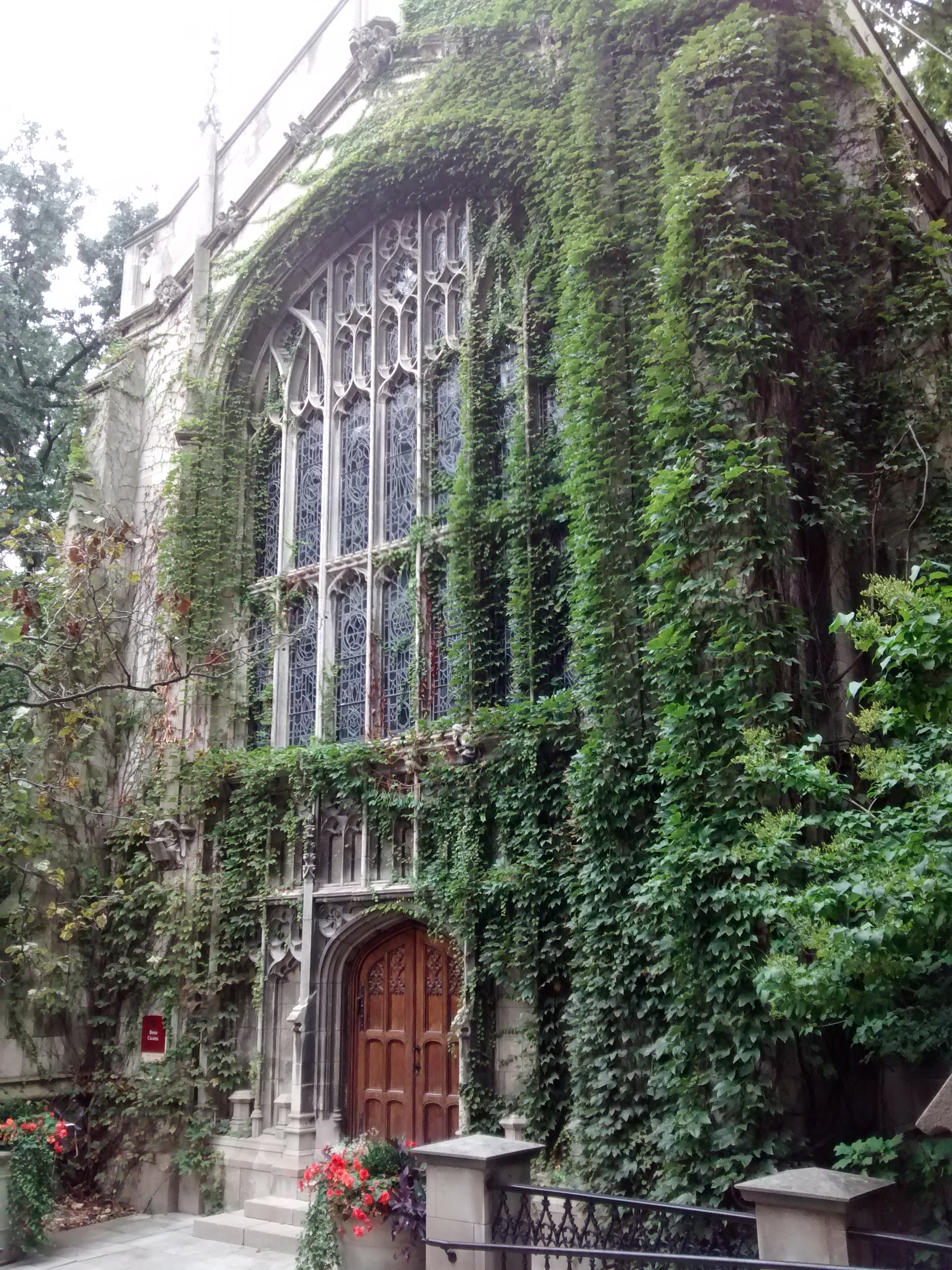
Bond Chapel

Southwest of Swift Hall and connected to it by a stone cloister is the Joseph Bond Chapel. Both Swift Hall and Bond Chapel were designed by the architects Coolidge and Hodgdon at the end of the Gothic revival period in America. The chapel was given by Mrs. Joseph Bond in memory of her husband, a former Trustee of the Baptist Theological Union, the predecessor institution of the Divinity School. Mr. and Mrs. Bond's daughter, Elfleda, married Edgar J. Goodspeed, a member of the university faculty noted for his translation of the New Testament. After her death in 1949, Mr. Goodspeed donated the stained-glass windows in her memory.

The cornerstone of the chapel was laid by Mrs. Bond on April 30, 1925, and the chapel was opened in October, 1926. In 2012–2013, the chapel was renovated and its organ was replaced by the Reneker Organ. Inspired by instruments built in northern Germany in the seventeenth and eighteenth centuries, the Reneker Organ was built by Canadian master organ builder Karl Wilhelm in 1983 for Graham Taylor Hall at the former home of the Chicago Theological Seminary. It was dedicated in 1984 in honor of the late Robert W. Reneker and Betty C. Reneker, and was moved to Bond Chapel in the autumn of 2012. The cloister connecting Bond Chapel to Swift Hall was reconstructed in 2014. A cloister garden is due to be installed between Swift and Bond in 2015.

As a Divinity School chapel in a major university, its main function is to provide a sanctuary for reflection, worship, and community gatherings. It is used extensively for weddings, funerals, mid-week Divinity School worship services, other religious services, theater presentations, and musical events performed by the university's smaller musical groups, such as Collegium Musicum. It seats about 300 persons.

== Notable faculty and former faculty ==
- Daniel A. Arnold, Indian and comparative philosophy of religion
- Hans Dieter Betz, emeritus, New Testament
- Anne Carr, feminist theologian (deceased)
- Ioan Petru Culianu, historian of religions (deceased)
- Arnold Davidson, philosopher and Michel Foucault specialist
- Wendy Doniger, scholar of Hinduism and comparative mythology
- Mircea Eliade, scholar of comparative religions (deceased)
- Jean Bethke Elshtain, political philosopher and ethicist (deceased)
- Michael Fishbane, Semitic languages, biblical studies, and Judaica
- Franklin I. Gamwell, emeritus, scholar of ethical and political theory (deceased)
- Robert M. Grant, New Testament and church history scholar (deceased)
- Seward Hiltner, pastoral theologian (deceased)
- Dwight N. Hopkins, constructive theologian
- Matthew Kapstein, scholar of Tibetan religions and Buddhist philosophy
- Hans-Josef Klauck, emeritus, New Testament
- Bruce Lincoln, emeritus, historian of religions and Indo-Europeanist
- Jean-Luc Marion, phenomenologist and theologian
- Martin E. Marty, emeritus, religion in America (deceased)
- Shailer Mathews, former dean (1908–1933)
- Bernard McGinn, emeritus, medieval mysticism
- Paul Mendes-Flohr, modern Jewish intellectual history (deceased)
- Margaret M. Mitchell, former dean (2010–2015), specialist in Early Christianity
- David Nirenberg, dean, historian of religions
- Martha C. Nussbaum, associated faculty; philosopher, legalist and public intellectual
- Norman Perrin, New Testament scholar (deceased)
- Paul Ricoeur, philosopher (deceased)
- Martin Riesebrodt, German sociologist and specializing on Max Weber's works (deceased)
- J. Coert Rylaarsdam, Old Testament scholar (deceased)
- William Schweiker, theological ethics
- Michael Sells, Islamic Studies and Qur'an
- Gerald Birney Smith, professor of Christian Theology (1900–1929)
- Jonathan Z. Smith, emeritus, influential historian of religions (deceased)
- Kathryn Tanner, theologian
- Paul Tillich, theologian (deceased)
- Emilie Townes, Christian social ethicist, womanist theologian
- David Tracy, Catholic theology (deceased)
- Christian K. Wedemeyer, historian of religions, Indian and Tibetan esoteric Buddhism
- Allen Wikgren, New Testament textual critic (deceased)
- Laurie Zoloth, former dean (2017–2018), bioethics and Jewish studies

== Publications ==
Several publications associated with the university:

- History of Religions (academic journal)
- The Journal of Religion (academic journal, founded 1882)
- Ethics (founded in 1890, no longer in publication)
- Criterion (founded in 1961 by then-dean Jerald Brauer, published twice a year).
- Circa (founded in 1992 as the dean's newsletter; alumni magazine published in the fall and spring quarters)
