= Brandan Robertson =

Christian writer, activist, and speaker

The Reverend Brandan Robertson
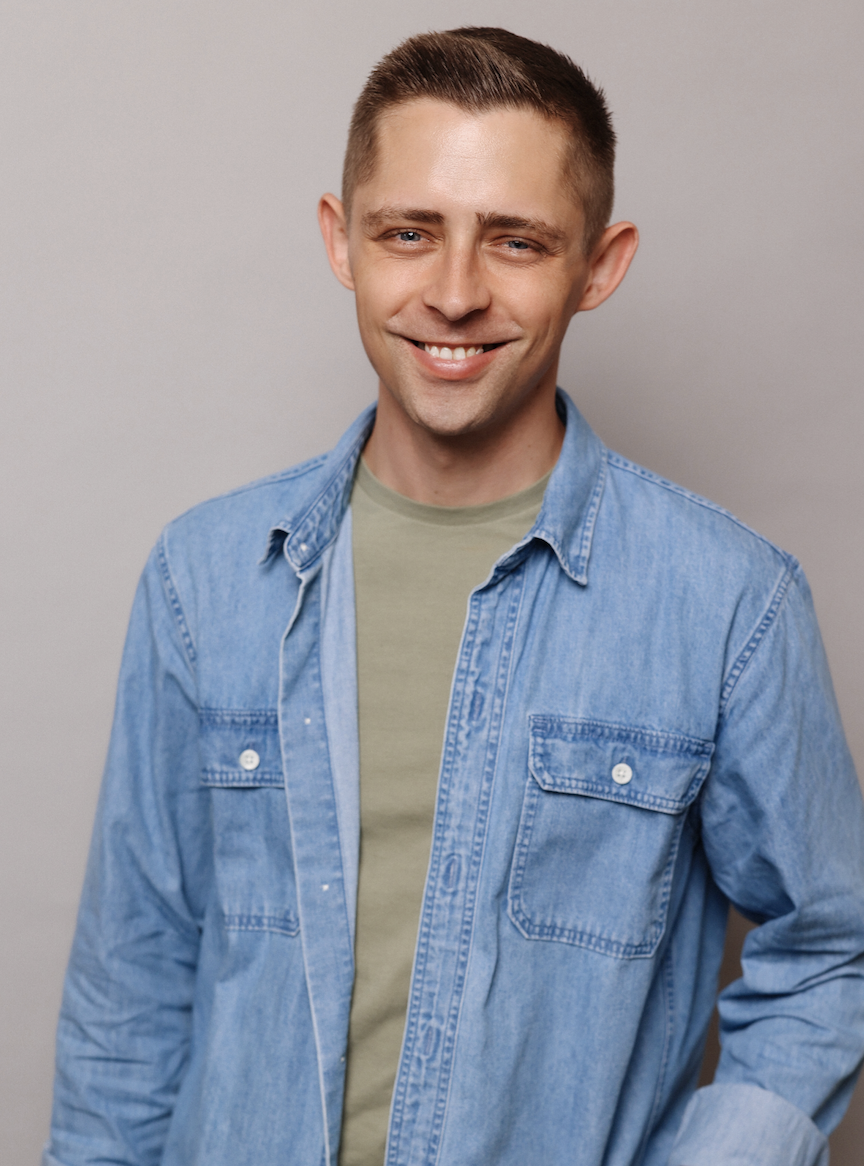
- Brandan Robertson's Author Photo, 2024
- Born: June 24, 1992 (age 33); Silver Spring, Maryland, U.S.
- Education: Moody Bible Institute (BA); Iliff School of Theology; Eastern Illinois University; Drew University
- Occupations: Pastor; Author
- Theological work
- Era: Early 21st centuries
- Tradition or movement: Progressive Christianity
- Main interests: Social Justice; Queer Theology

Brandan Robertson (born June 24, 1992) is an American writer, activist, and TikTok influencer. He has written on the subjects of millennials, social justice, and Progressive Christianity, and he is an LGBTQ activist. Robertson serves as the Pastor of Sunnyside Reformed Church in Queens, New York.

== Biography ==
Robertson became a Christian at the age of 12 in a Baptist church.

In 2014, he received a Bachelor of Arts from the Moody Bible Institute.

In September 2014, Robertson was named the national spokesman of "Evangelicals for Marriage Equality", an organization that sought to encourage evangelicals to support civil marriage equality, even if they were unable to support sacramental marriage equality in the church.

In November 2014, Robertson led the effort to convene a historic meeting between Southern Baptist leaders and LGBT+ movement leaders during the Southern Baptist Convention’s Ethics and Religious Liberty Commission's National Conference in Nashville, Tennessee. This meeting opened the doors for conversations and collaboration between some of the most influential religious leaders in America and leading LGBT+ activists. In 2015, Robertson's work was the subject of an MSNBC documentary film about his work to convince Southern Baptist leaders to support marriage equality.

In February 2015, publisher Destiny Image canceled its book deal with Robertson, citing his support for LGBTQ inclusion. The book was later published.

In March 2016, Robertson wrote an op-ed for Time magazine in which he claimed that he could not "in good conscience, remain aligned with the modern manifestation of the evangelical movement." He now identifies as a mainline Protestant and part of the Christian Left.

In 2017, he also obtained a master's degree from the Iliff School of Theology.

In 2017, he became pastor of the Missiongathering Christian Church (CC(DOC)) in San Diego. Robertson also obtained a Masters of Arts in Political Science from Eastern Illinois University in 2020.

In 2022, Robertson began his PhD in Biblical Studies at Drew University. In 2023, Robertson became Pastor of Sunnyside Reformed Church in Queens, New York (interdenominational congregation part of both RCA & UCC).

== Publications ==
- The Dark Side of White Christian Nationalism. Quior Books, 2025 (Contributing Author)
- Reading Romans Right. Quior Books, 2025 (Foreword Author)
- Queer and Christian: Reclaiming the Bible, Our Faith, and Our Place at the Table. New York: St. Martins Essentials, 2025
- The LOVE Boldly Devotional. Columbus: LOVEBoldly, 2024.(Contributing Author)
- Who is Jesus?. Nashville: Quior Books, 2024 (Contributing Author)
- The Outreach Guide on the Bible and Homosexuality. Chicago: Paulist Press, 2025 (Contributing Author)
- The Everyday Mystic. Nashville: Quior Books, 2025 (Contributing Author)
- Building Your Digital Sanctuary: An Introductory Guide to Effective Digital Ministry. Eugene: Cascade Books, 2023 (Editor)
- Dry Bones and Holy Wars: A Call for Social and Spiritual Renewal. Maryknoll: Orbis Books, 2022
- Only Love: How Everything Was, Is, and Will Be. Nashville: Quior Books, 2021 (Foreword Author)
- Filled to Be Emptied: The Path to Liberation for a Privileged People. Louisville: Westminster John Knox, 2022
- Nighttime Devotional for Teen Boys. New York: Rockridge Press, 2021
- Upper Room Disciplines Devotional. Nashville: Upper Room Books, 2021 (Contributing Author)
- How to Heal Our Divides. Minneapolis: Write for Your Life, 2021 (Contributing Author)
- The Deconstructionists Playbook. Philadelphia: Bemba Press, 2021 (Contributing Author)
- El Evangelio De La Inclusión. Miami: JuanUno1 Publishing, 2021 (Spanish Translation)
- Oneing: Liminal Space. Albuquerque: The Center for Action and Contemplation, 2021 (Contributing Author)
- Strength in Faith: A 52 Week Devotional for Men. New York: Rockridge Press, 2020
- Nomad: A Spirituality for Traveling Light. Minneapolis: Fortress Press, 2020 (Rerelease)
- Rally: Litanies for Justice Workers. Nashville: Upper Room Books, 2019 (Contributing Author)
- The Preachers Guide to the Lectionary, Volume 2. Louisville: Westminster John Knox, 2019 (Contributing Author)
- The Gospel of Inclusion: A Christian Case for LGBT+ Inclusion in The Church. Eugene: Cascade Books, 2019
- True Inclusion: Becoming A Community of Radical Embrace. Indianapolis: Chalice Press, 2019
- Our Witness: The Unheard Stories of LGBT+ Christians. Eugene: Cascade Books, 2018 (Editor)
- Zwerven Met God. Amsterdam: Kok Publishers, 2017 (Dutch Translation)
- Nomad: A Spirituality for Traveling Light. London: Darton, Longman, and Todd, 2016
- Courage to be Queer. Eugene: Wipf and Stock Publishers, 2016 (Foreword Author)
- Kissing in The chapel, Praying in The Frat House. New York: Rowman and Littlefield, 2014 (Contributing Author)
