= Christian K. Wedemeyer =

American academic

- Born: Christian Konrad Wedemeyer; 1969 (age 56–57); Minneapolis, Minnesota, U.S.
- Spouse: Gitanjali Kapila (m. 1996; div. 2013)

Academic background
- Education: Wesleyan University; Columbia University
- Thesis: Vajrayāna and Its Doubles (1999)
- Doctoral advisor: Robert Thurman
- Influences: Roland Barthes; Matthew Kapstein; Louis de La Vallée-Poussin; David Seyfort Ruegg; Jonathan Z. Smith; Hayden White

Academic work
- Discipline: Religious studies
- Sub-discipline: Buddhist studies; history of religion
- Institutions: University of Chicago
- Website: home.uchicago.edu/~aryadeva

Christian Konrad Wedemeyer (born 1969) is an American scholar, philanthropist, and political and social activist.

He is associate professor of the History of Religions and director of Doctoral Studies at the Divinity School, an associate member of the Department of South Asian Languages and Civilizations, and assistant marshal of the University of Chicago.

His work within the field of the history of religions has largely been concerned with the history, literature, and ritual of Indian and Tibetan Buddhism. In addition to historical and philological studies of Sanskrit and Tibetan religious literature, he has written on the historiography of Esoteric Buddhism and its antinomianism currents, textual criticism and strategies of legitimating authority in classical Tibetan scholasticism, and the semiology of esoteric Buddhist ritual.

He is the editor of the international journal History of Religions, former Buddhism editor for Religious Studies Review (Blackwell), and serves on the editorial boards of, and acts in a consulting capacity for a number of academic journals and presses.

He was elected a Fellow of the Royal Asiatic Society of Great Britain and Ireland in 2000, and elected to membership in the American Society for the Study of Religion in 2012. He has served as treasurer of the latter body since 2025. In 2010, he was elected to a three-year term as Co-chair of the Buddhism Section of the American Academy of Religion. In 2013, he was elected to a second term as co-chair of the AAR Buddhism Section and elected to a three-year term on the Executive Committee of the North American Association for the Study of Religion. He is also a member (and former officer) of the American Oriental Society; and active in the International Association for Tibetan Studies and the International Association of Buddhist Studies.

In 2010–2011 he was a Fellow of the National Endowment for the Humanities.

He was awarded the 2013 American Academy of Religion Award for Excellence in the Study of Religion (Historical Studies) for his book, Making Sense of Tantric Buddhism: History, Semiology, and Transgression in the Indian Traditions.

In February 2008, he was elected to a four-year term as Committeeman for the 5th Ward of the City of Chicago, Illinois (Green Party); and he was reappointed for a second term in 2012. In June 2014, he was elected Secretary of the Cook County Green Party. From 2007 until 2011, he was co-chair of the Hyde Park Green Party, a local chapter of the Illinois Green Party, Green Party of the United States.

He has consulted for the Metropolitan Museum of Art, CNN, the United States Department of Justice, the National Endowment for the Humanities, and a number of European scientific organizations.

== Education ==
- Ph.D. with distinction (1999, Columbia University in the City of New York)
- M.Phil. (1995, Columbia University in the City of New York)
- M.A. (1994, Columbia University in the City of New York)
- B.A. with High Honors in Religion (1991, Wesleyan University)

== Books ==
- Making Sense of Tantric Buddhism: History, Semiology, and Transgression in the Indian Traditions (Columbia University Press, 2013)
- Āryadeva's Lamp that Integrates the Practices (Caryāmelāpakapradīpa): The Gradual Path of Vajrayāna Buddhism according to the Esoteric Community Noble Tradition (AIBS/Columbia University Press, 2007)
- In Vimalakīrti's House: A Festschrift in Honor of Robert A.F. Thurman on the Occasion of His 70th Birthday (Ed. Christian K. Wedemeyer, John D. Dunne, and Thomas F. Yarnall; AIBS/Columbia University Press, 2014)
- Hermeneutics, Politics and the History of Religions: The Contested Legacies of Joachim Wach and Mircea Eliade (Ed. Christian K. Wedemeyer and Wendy Doniger; Oxford University Press, 2010)
- Tibetan Buddhist Literature and Praxis: Studies in its Formative Period, 900–1400 (Ed. Ronald M. Davidson and Christian K. Wedemeyer; E.J. Brill, 2006)

== Academic appointments ==
- Associate Professor of the History of Religions, University of Chicago Divinity School; also in the Department of South Asian Languages and Civilizations (2011–present)
- Assistant Professor of the History of Religions, University of Chicago Divinity School (2003–2011)
- Lecturer in South Asian Studies and Director, Tibetan Studies Program, University of Copenhagen (2000–2003)
- Post-doctoral Research Scholar, New College of the University of South Florida (2000)
- Adjunct Instructor of Buddhist Studies, Antioch University (1995, 1999)
- Adjunct Instructor of Religious Studies, Barnard College (1999, 2000)
- Preceptor, Columbia University (1996–1999)
- Instructor, Columbia University (1993–1995)
- Teaching Assistant, Columbia University (1992–1993)
- Teaching Apprentice, Wesleyan University (1990–1991)
