= Carrie Ann Lucas =

American lawyer (1971–2019)

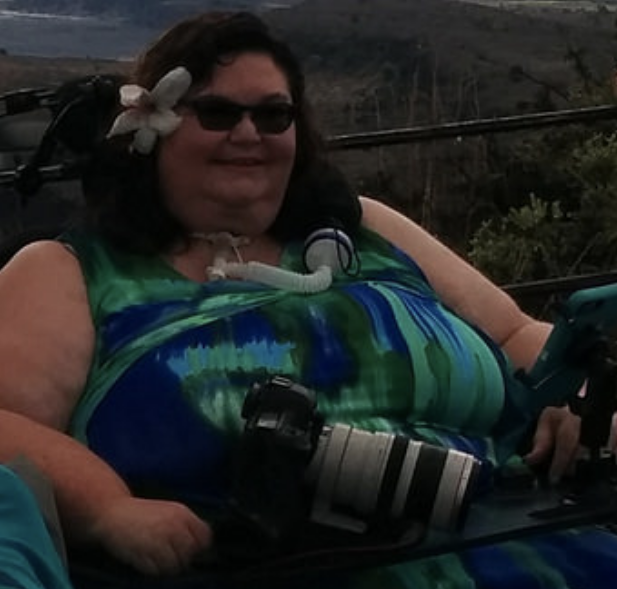
- Carrie Ann Lucas
- Born: November 18, 1971; Twentynine Palms, California
- Died: February 24, 2019 (aged 47); Medical Center of the Rockies, Loveland, Colorado
- Occupations: Lawyer, Teacher, Minister, Activist

Carrie Ann Lucas (November 18, 1971 – February 24, 2019) was a lawyer, disability rights advocate, and activist in the United States. She founded Disabled Parents Rights, an organization to fight discrimination against parents with disabilities. She was the successful lead plaintiff in a class-action lawsuit against Kmart over access for disabled customers, at the time the largest disability-access lawsuit.

== Early life and education ==
Lucas was born in Twentynine Palms, California, on November 18, 1971. Her father, Philip Emory Lucas, was in the Marine Corps, and her mother, LaVerne Rupert Lucas, worked as a sales manager.

After her father retired from the Mariners, the Lucas family moved to Windsor, Colorado, where she graduated from high school.

In high school, she began experience muscle strength loss, from a rare form of muscular dystrophy called central core myopathy. She used braces to walk beginning at age 17, and began using a wheelchair by her early 20s.

In 1994, Lucas graduated from Whitworth University in Spokane, Washington, where she double majored in education and sports medicine.

She was an ordained minister, graduating from the Iliff School of Theology in 1999, and also worked as a teacher while living in Saipan.

After experiencing prejudice after adopting her niece, Lucas went to law school, graduating from the Sturm College of Law at the University of Denver in 2005.

== Career ==
While working for the Colorado Cross-Disability Coalition, she was lead plaintiff for a class action suit against Kmart, one of the largest accessibility class action settlements to date. As part of the class-action settlement, Kmart had to pay $16.25 million and improve access at all its stores in the United States.

In 2004, Lucas founded the Center for the Rights of Parents with Disabilities. She was an advocate in the Disability Rights Movement with organizations such as ADAPT, Not Dead Yet, and the National Council on Disability for many years. She also served on the board of directors of the American Civil Liberties Union of Colorado. She ran for public office in Windsor, Colorado in 2017.

She spent substantial effort lobbying to ensure Colorado law codified that the disability of parent or guardian could not be the only reason for denying custody, adoption, foster care, or guardianship of a child, with HB18-1104, Family Preservation For Parents With Disability, which became law in 2018. She fought for this law after encountering challenges when adopting her niece; she subsequently adopted three other children with disabilities.

She also fought for Colorado to reject physician-assisted suicide, believing it suggested people with disabilities' lives were not worth leading.

With others from ADAPT, she was arrested after a 58-hour sit-in in the office of Colorado Senator Cory Gardner in 2017.

== Personal life ==
Lucas was openly lesbian.

== Death ==
In February 2019, at the age of 47, Lucas suffered cardiac arrest and died from complications from an ensuing infection. Her friends and family claimed Lucas' death was hastened by her insurance company's denial of necessary medication. Both the Colorado State House and State Senate held a moment of silence to honor Lucas after her death.
