= History of Religions (journal) =

- Discipline: History of religions
- Language: English
- Edited by: Christian K. Wedemeyer

Publication details
- History: 1961-present
- Publisher: University of Chicago Press for the University of Chicago Divinity School (United States)
- Frequency: Quarterly

Standard abbreviations
- ISO 4: Hist. Relig.

Indexing
- ISSN: 0018-2710
- LCCN: 64001081
- JSTOR: 00182710
- OCLC no.: 299661763

Links
- Journal homepage

History of Religions (HR) is the first academic journal devoted to the study of comparative religious history. The journal was founded in 1961 by Mircea Eliade. It is currently published by the University of Chicago Press. HR publishes articles that set the standard for the study of religious phenomena from prehistory to modern times, both within particular traditions and across cultural boundaries. In addition to major articles, the journal also publishes review articles and comprehensive book reviews. The journal also occasionally publishes special or theme issues. It is intended for historians of religion, anthropologists, comparative historians, and interdisciplinary scholars of religion.

== Access ==
The entire contents of the journal are available in full-text, searchable electronic databases. All issues except the most recent two years are available on JSTOR; more recent issues are available on the website of the publisher, University of Chicago Press.

== Abstracting and indexing ==
HR is abstracted and indexed in the Arts and Humanities Citation Index, Bibliography of Asian Studies, EBSCOhost, Scopus, and Web of Science.
