= Hans Dieter Betz =

American academic

Hans-Dieter Betz
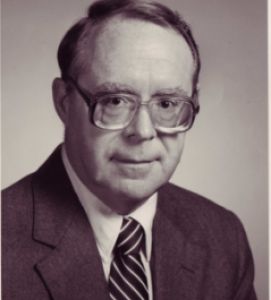
- Born: May 21, 1931 (age 95); Lemgo, Germany
- Awards: Burkitt Medal for Biblical Studies

Academic background
- Education: Gutenberg University, Mainz

Academic work
- Discipline: Biblical studies
- Sub-discipline: Early Christianity; New Testament
- Institutions: University of Chicago
- Doctoral students: Margaret M. Mitchell

Hans Dieter Betz (born May 21, 1931) is an American scholar of the New Testament and Early Christianity at the University of Chicago. He has made influential contributions to research on Paul's Letter to the Galatians, the Sermon on the Mount and the Greco-Roman context of Early Christianity.

== Biography ==
Hans Dieter Betz was born and raised in Germany. He received his theological education at Bethel and Mainz in Germany, and at Cambridge in England. Having studied with Herbert Braun, he graduated as Doctor of Theology and "Habilitation" at Mainz (1957, 1966); Dr. h.c. Erlangen. His list of scholarly publications includes New Testament literature, esp. on Paul's letters, as well as on Hellenistic history of religions, writing in English and German. He served also as editor of the lexica "Religion in Geschichte und Gegenwart" (4th ed. 1998-2005) and "Religion Past and Present" (2007-2014). He was a Reformed Tradition pastor until he went to the United States in 1963. From 1963 to 1978, he taught at the School of Theology (now Claremont School of Theology) and the Claremont Graduate School (now Claremont Graduate University) in California. From 1978 on he taught as the Shailer Mathews Professor of New Testament at the University of Chicago Divinity School and in the Department of New Testament and Early Christian Literature in the Humanities Division. He is an ordained member of the Presbytery of Chicago, United Presbyterian Church in the United States of America. Betz is also a past president of the Chicago Society of Biblical Research (1983-1984), the Society of Biblical Literature (1997), and the international Studiorum Novi Testamenti Societas (1999).

== The Sermon on the Mount ==
In his essay "The Sermon on the Mount: Its Literary Genre and Function," Betz discusses the problem of scholars in attempting to determine where the Sermon on the Mount fits in terms of its literary classification. He believes that there are clues within the content of the SM which could point the seeker in the right direction of making this determination and these clues lead him to conclude that the SM falls in the category of an epitome. He explains that "the epitome is a composition carefully designed out of sayings of Jesus which are grouped according to thematic points of doctrine considered of primary importance." What this means is that as opposed to the SM being intended to be viewed as "the law" or as a set of rules that believers must adhere to as has been the traditional interpretation, the SM, in Betz’s view represents a systematically organized summary of Jesus’ theology. As a result, Betz believes that the function of the SM is "to provide the disciple of Jesus with the necessary tool for becoming a Jesus theologian." He goes on to say that the SM is "theology to be intellectually appropriated and internalized... to be creatively developed and implemented in concrete situations in life." Thus, Betz argues that instead of viewing the SM as a list of items to do or not to do, it should be viewed critically and analytically by those who seek to follow in Jesus’ footsteps who can then take the values from his words and turn them into practical application for everyday life. Betz worked out these assumptions in his Hermeneia Commentary entitled "The Sermon on the Mount" (Minneapolis: Fortress Press, 1995). For an assessment of Betz' entire work see William Baird, "History of New Testament Research," vol. 3 (Minneapolis: Fortress Press, 2013), 659-87.

== The Sermon on the Mount and Q ==
Betz has devoted a great deal of scholarship discussing the Sermon on the Mount. Given that he is part of the school of thought that the answer to the Synoptic Problem lies within the Two-Source Hypothesis, any discussion about the SM invariably requires some mention of the Sermon on the Plain and Q. In fact, Betz credits centuries of discussion of the relationship between the SM and SP for the postulation by scholars of the existence of a Q document.

The first problem that scholars attempted to solve was to determine whether the Sermon on the Mount and the Sermon on the Plain were the result of two speeches given by Jesus or two versions of the same speech. Origen believed that the SM and SP were two versions of the same speech given by Jesus, whereas Augustine believed that they were two speeches; with the SM having been delivered to the disciples and the SP given to the general public.

The Enlightenment changed the focus toward critical investigation by scholars of the SM and the SP and whereas it was originally believed that the SM originated with the historical Jesus, by the Reformation, we have John Calvin viewing the SM and the SP as collections of sayings of Jesus brought together as a synopsis of Jesus’ teachings.

By the 19th century, scholars widely agreed with John Calvin’s view of the Sermons as two versions of the same speech, both of which were redactional compositions and as such the direction of the scholarship turned toward seeking the sources that were used by the evangelists. Among the hypotheses postulated during this time, Betz particularly seems to find the determinations made by Johann Gottfried Eichhorn at the turn of the century to be particularly important. According to Betz, Eichhorn was the first to suggest that the sections of the Sermons which were common to Matthew and Luke may have come from a common written source. He believed that the versions received by the evangelists had already been redacted and was therefore not in its original form at the time that they received it.

Carl Friedrich Georg Heinrici takes the work of Eichhorn further when at the turn of the 20th century he analyzed the sayings of the SM and the SP and determined their structure, composition and function. In doing so, he concluded that the oral transmission of the sayings of Jesus was carried on by his disciples for the purpose of collecting and preserving his legacy and that the move toward written sources occurred at the same time. He agreed with Eichhorn that they were not the products of redaction by the gospel writers of Matthew and Luke and originated during the presynoptic era. He stated that each of these Sermons should be treated as independent texts as the SM is close to Jewish Palestine where Jesus originated and the SP addresses the Gentiles. Each of these Sermons tries to communicate Jesus’ legacy to different audiences by secondary "reconstructions of a foundational speech of Jesus, in two versions and not depending on a common source." Betz feels that the work of Heinrici has been unduly overlooked by scholarship given that he offers an important perspective on the transmission of the message of Jesus and how we ended up with two speeches which are very similar and yet very different at the same time. However, scholarship went in a different direction at that time and focused on reconstructing the hypothetical source Q and discussions about the SM and the SP became dissolved into discussions about Q.

Betz himself acknowledges that the Two-Source Hypothesis best explains the parallel use of sayings in both Matthew and Luke which suggests that a Q document existed at one time. The location of the Sermons in Matthew and Luke suggests to Betz that there must have been some kind of sermon in Q. He believes that the evangelists received their sermons from different versions of Q which contained the version of the sermon that is reflected in their respective gospels.

== Honours ==
In 2000, Betz was awarded the Burkitt Medal by the British Academy. It is granted 'in recognition of special service to Biblical Studies'. Betz is an elected member of the American Academy of Arts and Sciences.

== Selected works ==
=== Books ===
- Betz, Hans Dieter (1961). Lukian von Samosata und das Neue Testament: Religionsgeschichtliche und Paränetische Parallelen. Ein Beitrag zum Corpus Hellenisticum Novi Testamenti. Texte und Untersuchungen zur Geschichte der altchristlichen Literatur 76. Berlin: Akademie-Verlag. ISBN 9783112718162.
- ——— (1967). Nachfolge und Nachahmung Jesu Christi im Neuen Testament. Beiträge zur historischen Theologie 37. Tübingen: Mohr. ISBN 9780800607265. OCLC 10779510.
- ——— (1972). Der Apostel Paulus und die sokratische Tradition: eine exegetische Untersuchung zu seiner Apologie 2 Korinther 10-13. Beiträge zur historischen Theologie 45. Tübingen: Mohr. ISBN 3161326016.
- ——— (1979). Galatians: a commentary on Paul's letter to the churches in Galatia. Hermeneia--a critical and historical commentary on the Bible. Philadelphia, PA: Fortress Press. ISBN 9780800660093. OCLC 5658552.
- ——— (1985). 2 Corinthians 8 and 9: a commentary on two administrative letters of the Apostle Paul. Hermeneia--a critical and historical commentary on the Bible. Philadelphia, PA: Fortress Press. ISBN 9780800660147. OCLC 12370271.
- ——— (1985). Essays on the Sermon on the Mount. Philadelphia, PA: Fortress Press. ISBN 9780800607265. OCLC 10779510.
- ——— (1995). The Sermon on the Mount: a commentary on the Sermon on the mount, including the Sermon on the plain (Matthew 5:3-7:27 and Luke 6:20-49). Hermeneia--a critical and historical commentary on the Bible. Minneapolis, MN: Fortress Press. ISBN 9780800660314. OCLC 31899998.
- ——— (2003). The "Mithras Liturgy": text, translation, and commentary. Studien und Texte zu Antike und Christentum. Vol. 18. Tübingen: Mohr Siebeck. ISBN 9783161481284. OCLC 52944290.
- ——— (2015). Studies in Paul's letter to the Philippians. Wissenschaftliche Untersuchungen zum Neuen Testament. Vol. 343. Tübingen: Mohr Siebeck. ISBN 9783161531194. OCLC 903598039.

=== Works edited ===
- Perrin, Norman (1974). ——— (ed.). Christology and a Modern Pilgrimage: a discussion with Norman Perrin. Missoula, MN: Society of Biblical Literature and the Scholars' Press. ISBN 9780884140498. OCLC 1203776.
- ———, ed. (1981). The Bible as a Document of the University. Polebridge books. Vol. 3. Chico, CA: Scholars Press. ISBN 9780891304210. OCLC 6708775.
- ———, ed. (1986). The Greek Magical Papyri in Translation, including the Demotic spells. Chicago, IL: University of Chicago Press. ISBN 9780226044446. OCLC 11815708.
- ———; Browning, Don; Janowski, Bernd; Jüngel, Eberhard; et al., eds. (2007–2013). Religion Past & Present: Encyclopedia of theology and religion. Leiden & Boston: Brill. ISBN 9789004163331. OCLC 62290620. - in total 13 volumes.

== See also ==
- Greek Magical Papyri
