= Miguel A. De La Torre =

Cuban-American Baptist minister born (1958)

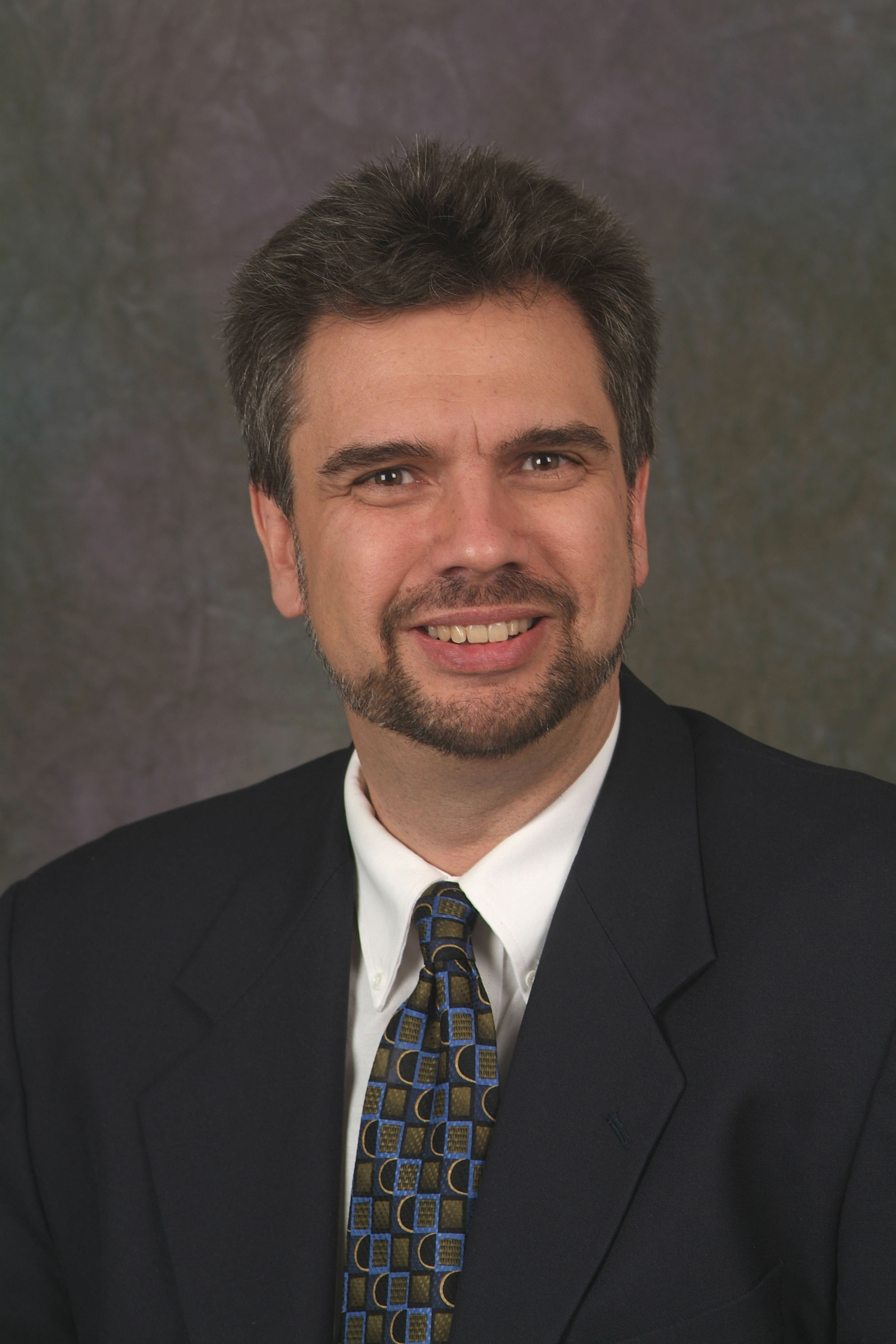
- De La Torre in 2009
- Born: 6 October 1958 (age 67); Havana, Cuba
- Education: Temple University
- Known for: Work analyzing social ethics and hispanic religiosity
- Awards: "Outstanding Hispanic Educator" award by the Michigan Hispanic Legislative Caucus "2016 Outstanding Faculty Award" by University of Denver/Iliff Joint Doctoral Program
- Scientific career
- Fields: Social ethics, theology of liberation, Latinx religiosity, Santería
- Workplaces: Iliff School of Theology

Miguel A. De La Torre (born 6 October 1958) is a Cuban-American professor of Social Ethics and Latino Studies at Iliff School of Theology, author, and an ordained Southern Baptist minister.

== Biography ==
Born in Cuba months before the Castro Revolution, De La Torre and his family migrated to the United States as refugees when he was an infant. For a while the U.S. government considered him and his family as "illegal aliens". On 6 June 1960, De La Torre received an order from Immigration and Naturalization Service to "self-deport." He attended Blessed Sacrament, a Catholic elementary school in Queens, New York, and was baptized and confirmed by the Catholic Church. Simultaneously, his parents were priest/priestess of the religion Santería. He refers to himself as a "Southern Baptist, Roman Catholic child of Ellegúa."

In his early twenties he became a "born-again" Christian, joining University Baptist Church in Coral Gables, Florida. In 1992, De La Torre dissolved the thirteen-year-old real estate company to attend Southern Baptist Theological Seminary in order to obtain a Master of Divinity and enter the ministry. During his seminary training he served as pastor at a rural congregation, Goshen Baptist Church in Glen Dean, Kentucky. While doing pastoral work in rural Kentucky, De La Torre had experiences that caused him to begin exploring the church's power structures and what the dominant European American culture could learn from the Latino margins.

== Scholarship ==
De La Torre continued his theological training and obtained a doctorate from Temple University in social ethics in 1999. According to the books he published, he focuses on ethics within contemporary U.S. thought, specifically how religion affects race, class, and gender oppression. His works 1) applies a social scientific approach to Latino/a religiosity within this country; 2) studies Liberation theologies in the Caribbean and Latin America (specifically in Cuba); and 3) engages in postmodern/postcolonial social theory.

In 1999 he was hired to teach Christian Ethics at Hope College in Holland, Michigan. In 2005 he wrote a column for the local newspaper, The Holland Sentinel, titled "When the Bible is Used for Hatred." The article was a satirical piece commenting on Focus on the Family's James Dobson outing of SpongeBob SquarePants. Dobson responded to the article.

A controversy over these articles ensued. A few months afterwards, De La Torre was forced to resign his tenure and took the position of associate professor for social ethics at Iliff School of Theology in Denver, Colorado.

Since obtaining his doctorate in 1999, De La Torre has authored numerous articles and books, including several books that have won national awards, specifically: Reading the Bible from the Margins, (Orbis, 2002); Santería: The Beliefs and Rituals of a Growing Religion in America (Wm. B. Eerdmans, 2004); Doing Christian Ethics from the Margins, (Orbis, 2004); and Encyclopedia on Hispanic American Religious Culture, Volume 1 & 2, (ABC-CLIO, 2009). Within the academy he has served as a director to the Society of Christian Ethics and the American Academy of Religion.

He is the founder and editor of the Journal of Race, Ethnicity, and Religion.

De La Torre has been an expert commentator concerning ethical issues (mainly Hispanic religiosity, LGBT civil rights, and immigration rights) on several local, national, and international media outlets.

In 2021, De La Torre won the Excellence in Teaching Award given by the American Academy of Religion.

Also in 2021, De La Torre won the Martin E. Marty Public Understanding of Religion Award, also given by the American Academy of Religion.

== Works ==
Books

- Ajiaco Christianity: Toward an Exilic Cuban Ethic of Reconciliation (Ph.D. diss.), 1999.
- Reading the Bible from the Margins, 2002.
- The Quest for the Cuban Christ: A Historical Search, 2002.
- La Lucha for Cuba: Religion and Politics on the Streets of Miami, 2003.
- Santería: The Beliefs and Rituals of a Growing Religion in America, 2004.
- Doing Christian Ethics from the Margins, 2004.
- Leer la Biblia desde los Marginados, 2005.
- A Lily Among the Thorns: Imagining a New Christian Sexuality, 2007.
- Liberating Jonah: Toward a Biblical Ethics of Reconciliation, 2007.
- Trails of Hope and Terror: Testimonies on Immigration, 2009.
- Latina/o Social Ethics: Moving Beyond Eurocentric Thinking, 2010.
- A La Familia: A Conversation about Our Families, the Bible Sexual Orientation and Gender, 2011.
- Genesis: A Theological Commentary on the Bible, 2011.
- Liberation Theologies for Arm Chair Theologians, 2013.
- Doing Christian Ethics from the Margins, 2nd Edition, 2014.
- The Politics of Jesús: Toward a Hispanic Political Theology, 2015.
- Liberating Sex, 2016.
- The Immigration Crises: Toward an Ethics of Place, 2016.
- Embracing Hopelessness, 2017.
- Burying White Privilege: Resurrecting A Badass Christianity, 2018.
- José Martí's Liberative Political Theology, 2021.
- Decolonizing Christianity: Becoming Badass Believers, 2021.

Co-authored books

- Introducing Latino/a Theologies, with Edwin David Aponte, 2001.
- The Quest for the Historical Satan, with Albert Hernandez, 2011.
- Introducing Latinx Theologies, with Edwin David Aponte, 2020.

Edited books

- Handbook on U.S. Theologies of Liberation, 2004.
- Handbook on Latino/a Theologies, co-edited with Edwin David Aponte, 2006.
- Rethinking Latino/a Religion and Ethnicity, co-edited with Gaston Espinosa, 2006.
- AAR Career Guide for Racial and Ethnic Minorities in the Profession, 2007.
- The Hope of Liberation within World Religions, 2008.
- Out of the Shadows, Into the Light: Christianity and Homosexuality, 2009.
- Beyond the Pale: Reading Christian Ethics from the Margins, co-edited with Stacey Floyd-Thomas, 2011.
- Beyond the Pale: Reading Christian Theology from the Margins, co-edited with Stacey Floyd-Thomas, 2011.
- Ethics: A Liberative Approach, 2013.
- Introducing Liberative Theologies, 2015.
- Faith and Resistance in an Age of Trump, 2017.
- Resisting Occupation: A Global Struggle for Liberation, co-edited with Mitri Raheb, 2020.
- The Colonial Compromise: The Threat of the Gospel to the Indigenous Worldview, 2020.
- Water and the Problem of Environmental Racism, 2021.

Encyclopedia editor

- Encyclopedia on Hispanic American Religious Culture, Volume 1 & 2, 2009.
