= Edwin David Aponte =

Puerto Rican-American cultural historian

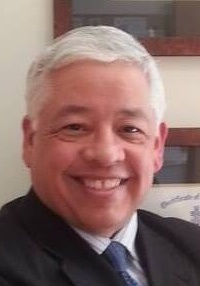
Edwin David Aponte, March 2014

Edwin David Aponte (born 4 August 1957) is a Puerto Rican-American cultural historian, religious studies scholar, and contributor to the development of Christianity among Hispanic and Latino/a Americans. His research focuses on the interplay between religion and culture, especially Hispanic/Latino(a) religions, African-American religions, North American religious history, and congregational studies. He is one of a small number of U.S. Hispanic historians of Christianity.

In late 2025 Aponte serves as Dean of the Theological School at Drew University in Madison, NJ.

== Early life and education ==
Aponte was born in Bridgeport, Connecticut, of Roman Catholic Puerto Rican parents. Aponte attended public schools in Bridgeport, graduating from Bassick High School in 1975. His family is from Salinas, Puerto Rico between Guayama and Ponce on the southern side of the island. His father Domingo David Aponte was born in Coamo. His mother Ana Raquel Ortiz was born in Salinas.

Aponte received a B.A. in Biblical and Theological Studies from Gordon College (Massachusetts) in 1979, a M.A. in Theological Studies with a concentration in Old Testament from Gordon-Conwell Theological Seminary in 1982, a M.A. in Religion in 1994 and Ph.D. in religion in 1998 both from Temple University in Philadelphia, Pennsylvania. He is an ordained teaching elder (minister of Word and Sacrament) in the Presbyterian Church (U.S.A.).

== Career ==
In 2014–2015, Aponte was Dean and Chief Executive Administrator as well as Professor of Religion and Culture at Palmer Theological Seminary of Eastern University. From 1 July 2012 – 30 June 2014, Aponte was Vice President for Academic Affairs, Dean of the Faculty, and Professor of Religion and Culture at Christian Theological Seminary in Indianapolis, Indiana. Previously Aponte was Research Professor of Latina/o Christianity at New York Theological Seminary. From 2006 to 2010 he served as Vice President of Academic Affairs and Dean of the Seminary of Lancaster Theological Seminary in Lancaster, Pennsylvania, and also was professor of religion and culture. From 1998 to 2006 Aponte served on the faculty of Perkins School of Theology at Southern Methodist University in Dallas, Texas, where he was Director of Advanced Studies (2004–2006) and Associate Professor of Christianity and Culture. From 1994 to 1998 he was founding Director of the Institute for International and Cultural Studies at North Park University in Chicago composed of the Center for Middle Eastern Studies, the Center for Korean Studies, the Center for Africana Studies, the Center for Scandinavian Studies, and the Center for Latino Studies, each involved in intercultural, international, and inter-religious initiatives and activities. Concurrently Aponte served as the founding Executive Director of the Center for Latino Studies at North Park University.

Aponte has received fellowships from the Wabash Center for Teaching and Learning in Theology and Religion, the Fund for Theological Education, the Hispanic Theological Initiative, Temple University, Southern Methodist University, the Pew Charitable Trusts, the Fund for Graduate Education of the Presbyterian Church, (USA), The Louisville Institute, and The Lilly Endowment, Inc.

Aponte has served almost continually on the Governing Board of the Hispanic Summer Program in the years 1994-2010, notably seven years as Secretary and member of the Executive Committee. He is a member of the American Academy of Religion (AAR) and served on the Academic Relations Committee, the Steering Committee of the History of Christianity section, and of the Latin@ Religion, Culture and Society Group of the AAR.

Aponte was a member of the Re-forming Ministry Initiative, a national project of the Office of Theology, Worship, and Education of the Presbyterian Church (USA). He also was a member of the Selection Committee of the Hispanic Theological Initiative (HTI), a program with the mission to assist Latino/a doctoral candidates through scholarships, mentoring, and supportive networks. The HTI was the predecessor to the Hispanic Theological Initiative Consortium (HTIC).

Aponte recently served as Executive Director of the Louisville Institute, a Lilly Endowment, Inc.-funded program based at Louisville Seminary supporting those who lead and study North American religious institutions.

In February 2022 he was appointed dean of the Theological School of Drew University (Madison, New Jersey), where he started on June 1, 2022.

== Selected writings ==
Books

- Torre, Miguel A. De La; Aponte, Edwin David (22 October 2001). Introducing Latino/a Theologies. Maryknoll, N.Y.: Orbis Books. ISBN 1570754004.
- Aponte, Edwin David; De La Torre, Miguel A., eds. (1 May 2006). Handbook of Latina/o Theologies. St. Louis: Chalice Press. ISBN 0-827-21450-2.
- Aponte, Edwin David (22 March 2012). ¡Santo!: Varieties of Latina/o Spirituality. Maryknoll, New York: Orbis Books. ISBN 978-1-570-75964-2.

Book Chapters and Articles

- Espín, Orlando O., ed. (2015). "Protestant Ecclesiology". The Wiley Blackwell Companion to Latino/a Theology. Malden, Massachusetts: Wiley-Blackwell. pp. 199–214. ISBN 978-1-118-71865-0. "Part of the Wiley Blackwell Companions to Religion series."
- Espín, Orlando O., ed. (2015). "Theologizing Popular Protestantism". The Wiley Blackwell Companion to Latino/a Theology. Malden, Massachusetts: Wiley-Blackwell. pp. 401–420. ISBN 978-1-118-71865-0. "Part of the Wiley Blackwell Companions to Religion series."
- De La Torre, Miguel A.; Floyd-Thomas, Stacey M., eds. (27 October 2011). "Friedrich Schleiermacher". Beyond the Pale: Reading Theology from the Margins (1st ed.). Louisville, Kentucky: Westminster John Knox. pp. 105–114. ISBN 978-0-664-23679-3.
- “A Latino Liberationist Voice” in Trails of Hope and Terror: Testimonies on Immigration, Miguel A. De La Torre. Maryknoll, NY: Orbis Books, 2009.
- “Metaphysical Blending in Latino/a Botánicas in Dallas,” in Rethinking Latino/a Religion and Identity, Miguel A. De La Torre and Gastón Espinosa, eds. Cleveland, OH: Pilgrim Press, 2006.
- “Theological and Cultural Competence en Conjunto,” in Handbook of Latina/o Theologies, Edwin David Aponte and Miguel A. De La Torre, eds. St. Louis, MO: Chalice Press, 2006.
- “A View from the Margins: Constructing a History of Latino/a Protestantism,” in Latino Christian Thought at the Dawn of the 21st Century: Apuntes in Honor of Justo L. González, Alvin Padilla, Roberto Goizueta, and Eldin Villafañe, ed. Nashville: Abingdon Press, 2005.
- “Rethinking the Core: African and African American Religious Perspectives in the Seminary Curriculum,” in Teaching African American Religions (AAR Teaching Series), Carolyn M. Jones and Theodore Louis Trost, ed. New York: Oxford University Press, 2005.
- “Hispanics” in Handbook of U.S. Theologies of Liberation, Miguel A. De La Torre, ed. St. Louis, MO: Chalice Press, 2004.
- “Music and the U.S. Latina and Latino Experience,” in Introduction to the U.S. Latina and Latino Religious Experience, Hector Avalos, ed. Boston: Brill Academic Publishers, 2004.
- “Hispanic/Latino Protestantism in Philadelphia,” in Re-Forming the Center: American Protestantism 1900 to the Present, Douglas Jacobsen and William Vance Trollinger, Jr., eds. Grand Rapids: Wm. B. Eerdmans Publishing Co., 1998.
- Aponte, Edwin David (1995). "Coritos as Active Symbol in Latino Protestant Popular Religion". Journal of Hispanic/Latino Theology. 2 (3): 57–66.
