= Robert M. Grant (theologian) =

American theologian and scholar (1917–2014)

- University of Chicago 1978
- Born: Robert McQueen Grant; November 25, 1917; Evanston, Illinois, US
- Died: June 10, 2014 (aged 96); Chicago, Illinois, US

Academic background
- Education: Northwestern University; Union Theological Seminary; Harvard University

Academic work
- Discipline: New Testament; Early Christianity
- Institutions: University of Chicago
- Doctoral students: David E. Aune

Robert McQueen Grant (November 25, 1917 – June 10, 2014) was an American academic theologian and the Carl Darling Buck Professor Emeritus of Humanities and of New Testament and Early Christianity at the University of Chicago (in the former Department of New Testament & Early Christian Literature and also in the Divinity School). His scholarly work focused on the New Testament and Early Christianity.

== Life ==
Grant is the son of well-known New Testament scholar Frederick C. Grant and Helen McQueen Grant (née Hardie). He earned a Bachelor of Arts degree with distinction from Northwestern University in 1938; attended the Episcopal Theological School in Cambridge, Massachusetts from 1938 to 1939; moved to Columbia University in 1939–1940; and earned a Bachelor of Divinity degree from Union Theological Seminary in 1941. In 1942, Grant was ordained to the priesthood in the Episcopal Church. He went on to earn an S.T.M. in 1942 and a Th.D. in 1944, both from Harvard Divinity School. During this time he also ministered at St James Episcopal Church in South Groveland, Massachusetts.

From 1944 until 1953, Grant served as instructor and ultimately professor of New Testament studies in the School of Theology at the University of the South. He became associate professor at the University of Chicago Divinity School in 1953 and full professor in 1958. In 1973 Grant was named Carl Darling Buck Professor of the Humanities.

Grant's commitment to the racial desegregation of the South began during his tenure at the University of the South. In 1952, the trustees of the School of Theology voted against the mandate from the provincial synod of the Episcopal Church to admit African Americans to the School. Grant was one of eight theology faculty members who sent a letter of protest to the chairman of the Board of Trustees charging that the board's decision was unethical. All threatened to resign if the decision were not rescinded. By 1953 all of the eight faculty members had left and been replaced. His engagement with civil liberties continued and he joined other ministers and Chicago faculty on the march on Selma in March 1965 after “Bloody Sunday.”

Throughout his career, Grant served as president of a number of professional societies: the Society of Biblical Literature and Exegesis (1959), the Chicago Society of Biblical Research (1963–1964), the American Society of Church History (1970) and the North American Patristics Society (1975).

Grant was a visiting lecturer at Vanderbilt University (1945–1947), at Seabury-Western Theological Seminary (1954–1955) and a visiting professor at Yale University (1964–65). He was also Fulbright Research Professor at the University of Leiden from 1950 to 1951. He was thrice the recipient of Guggenheim Fellowships (in 1950, 1954 and 1959). Grant was honoured with Doctor of Divinity degrees from Seabury-Western Theological Seminary (1969) and the University of Glasgow (1979).

Grant married Margaret Huntington Horton, daughter of American Protestant clergyman and academic leader Douglas Horton, on 21 December 1940. He died at his home in Hyde Park, Chicago, Illinois in 2014.

== Work ==
Professor Grant was the most prolific and influential American historian of ancient Christianity of his generation. The author of over thirty-three books and countless articles, Grant's work was characterized by philological exactness, a deep knowledge of the ancient world, and philosophical and theological finesse, together with a tight prose style and dry wit. He published on a wide range of topics dealing with early Christianity, including the New Testament, the Apostolic Fathers, "Gnosticism", biblical interpretation, the second-century Christian apologists, Origen and Origenism and the Graeco-Roman intellectual background of early Christian writers. He has also published several important studies of U-Boat warfare in World War I, recently reprinted.

== Select publications ==
=== Books ===
- ——— (1946). Second-Century Christianity: A Collection of Fragments. London: SPCK.
- Grant, Robert M. (1952). Miracle and Natural Law in Graeco-Roman and Early Christian Thought. Amsterdam: North-Holland Publishing. OCLC 1050467027.
- ——— (1957). The Letter and the Spirit. New York: Macmillan. OCLC 213821036.
- ——— (1959). Gnosticism and Early Christianity. New York.
- ———; Freedman, David Noel (1960). The Secret Sayings of Jesus. Garden City, NY.
- ——— (1960). U-Boats Destroyed: The Effects of Anti-Submarine Warfare 1914-1918. London.
- ——— (1961). Gnosticism: A Source Book Of Heretical Writings From The Early Christian Period. New York.
- ——— (1961). The Earliest Lives of Jesus. Cambridge.
- ——— (1963). A Historical Introduction to the New Testament. New York.
- ——— (1964). Volume 1, An Introduction. New York: Thomas Nelson & Sons.
- ——— (1965). The Formation of the New Testament. New York.
- ——— (1965). Volume 2, First and Second Clement. New York: Thomas Nelson & Sons.
- ——— (1966). Volume 4, Ignatius of Antioch. New York: Thomas Nelson & Sons.
- ——— (1967). After the New Testament: Studies in Early Christian Literature and Theology. Philadelphia, PA.
- ——— (1969). U-Boat Intelligence: Admiralty Intelligence Division and the Defeat of the U-Boats 1914-1918. Hampden, CT.
- ——— (1970). Theophilus of Antioch: Ad Autolycum. Oxford Early Christian Texts. Oxford: Oxford University Press.
- ——— (1976). Perspectives on Scripture and Tradition: Essays. Notre Dame.
- ——— (1977). Early Christianity and Society: Seven Studies. New York. ISBN 9780060634117.
- ——— (1980). Eusebius as Church Historian. Oxford: Oxford University Press.
- ——— (1983). Christian Beginnings: Apocalypse to History. Variorium Reprints.
- ———; Tracy, David (1984). A Short History of the Interpretation of the Bible. Philadelphia.
- ——— (1988). Greek Apologists of the Second Century. Philadelphia.
- ——— (1986). Gods and the One God. Library of Early Christianity. Vol. 1. Philadelphia.
- ——— (1990). Jesus After the Gospels: The Christ of the Second Century. Louisville. ISBN 9780664219192.
- ——— (1993). Heresy and Criticism: The Search for Authenticity in Early Christian Literature. Louisville.
- ——— (1997). Irenaeus of Lyons. The Early Church Fathers. London & New York: Routledge. ISBN 9780415118378. OCLC 299847161.
- ——— (1999). Early Christians and Animals. New York & London.
- ——— (2001). Paul in the Roman World: the Conflict at Corinth. Louisville.
- ——— (2003). Second-Century Christianity: A Collection of Fragments, revised and expanded. Louisville.
- ——— (2003). U-Boat Hunters: Code Breakers, Divers and the Defeat of the U-boats, 1914-1918. Annapolis.
- ——— (2004). Augustus to Constantine: The Rise and Triumph of Christianity in the Roman World, with a substantial new foreword by Margaret M. Mitchell. Louisville.

=== Edited by ===
- ———, ed. (1964–1968). The Apostolic Fathers: A New Translation and Commentary - (in 6 vols.). New York: Thomas Nelson & Sons. - author of three volumes (see above)

== Festschriften ==
- Schoedel, William R.; Wilken, Robert L., eds. (1979). Early Christian Literature and the Classical Intellectual Tradition: In honorem Robert M. Grant. Théologie historique. Vol. 54. Paris: Éditions Beauchesne.
- Aune, David E.; Young, Robin Darling, eds. (2007). Reading Religions in the Ancient World: Essays presented to Robert McQueen Grant on his 90th Birthday. Supplements to Novum Testamentum. Vol. 125. Leiden: E. J. Brill.
