= Seward Hiltner =

American pastoral theologian (1909–1984)

- Born: 26 November 1909; Tyrone, Pennsylvania, U.S.
- Died: November 19, 1984 (aged 74); Princeton, New Jersey, U.S.
- Education: B.A. Psychology, Lafayette College (1931); Ph.D. Theological Ethics, University of Chicago (1952)
- Occupation: Theologian
- Years active: 1935–1980
- Organizations: University of Chicago Divinity School; Princeton Theological Seminary; Federal Council of Churches
- Known for: Integrating theology and behavioral sciences
- Notable work: Pastoral Counseling (1949); Self‑Understanding: Through Psychology and Religion (1951); Preface to Pastoral Theology (1958); The Context of Pastoral Counseling (with Lowell Colston, 1961); The Theological Dynamics (1972)
- Spouse: Helen Margaret Johansen (m. 1936)
- Children: Two
- Awards: Academy Religion & Mental Health Award (1966); George Washington Kidd Award (1977); Distinguished Service Award, American Association of Pastoral Counselors (1980)

Seward Hiltner (November 26, 1909 – November 19, 1984) was an American pastoral theologian who was an early advocate for integrating theology with the behavioral sciences. He taught for many years at both the University of Chicago Divinity School and Princeton Theological Seminary.

== Early life and education ==
Born on November 26, 1909, in Tyrone, Pennsylvania, Seward Hiltner received a bachelor's degree in psychology in 1931 from Lafayette College and a doctorate in theological ethics in 1952 from the University of Chicago.

== Career and ministry ==
Ordained in 1935 as a minister in the United Presbyterian Church of North America, Hiltner was the executive secretary of the Council for the Clinical Training of Theological Students from 1935 to 1938. From 1938 to 1950 he was the executive secretary of the Federal Council of Churches. In 1950, he joined the University of Chicago Divinity School, where he helped establish one of the first doctoral programs in religion and personality, incorporating theology, psychology, sociology, and the medical sciences.

Hiltner joined the faculty at Princeton Theological Seminary in 1961, and retired in 1980.

During his career Hiltner also taught at Yale Divinity School, Union Theological Seminary, at the Menninger School of Psychiatry, and at the University of Utrecht.

Hiltner wrote twelve books and more than 500 articles on pastoral theology, pastoral care, and counseling.

== Philosophy ==
Hiltner argued that practical theology should be understood as a theological discipline grounded in the practice of ministry rather than as a collection of ministerial techniques. He developed the perspectival method, which approached ministry through three lenses: communication, organization, and shepherding. He associated the shepherding perspective with pastoral theology and with care in the parish context.

In his book Preface to Pastoral Theology, Hiltner traced the historical roots of the cure of souls and drew on case-study methods associated with nineteenth-century pastor Ichabod Spencer. He maintained that pastoral care should remain rooted in congregational ministry rather than primarily in clinical settings. In The Context of Pastoral Counseling, written with Lowell Colston, Hiltner contrasted counseling within a community setting with counseling in clinical settings.

== Personal life and death ==
Hiltner was married to Helen Margaret Johansen, and had two children. He died in Princeton, New Jersey on November 19, 1984.

== Selected publications ==
- Religion and Health. New York: Macmillan, 1943.
- Pastoral Counseling. New York: Abington Press, 1949.
- Self-Understanding: Through Psychology and Religion. New York: Charles Scribner's Sons, 1951.
- The Counselor in Counseling. New York: Abington Press, 1952.
- Sex Ethics and the Kinsey Reports. New York: Association Press, 1953.
- Sex and the Christian Life. New York: Association Press, 1957.
- Preface to Pastoral Theology. New York: Abington Press, 1958.
- The Christian Shepherd: Some Aspects of Pastoral Care. New York: Abington Press, 1959.
- The Context of Pastoral Counseling. (with Lowell Colston). New York: Abington Press, 1961.
- Ferment in the Ministry. Nashville: Abingdon Press, 1969
- Theological Dynamics. Nashville: Abingdon Press, 1972.
