= George Tinker =

American Indian scholar

George E. "Tink" Tinker is an American Indian scholar of the Osage Nation who taught for more than three decades at the Iliff School of Theology, a United Methodist Church theological school, where he focused his scholarship on the decolonization of American Indian Peoples. The Tinker family name is deeply embedded among the Osage.

== Career ==
Tinker is the Clifford Baldridge Emeritus Professor of American Indian Cultures and Religious Traditions at the Iliff School of Theology in Denver, Colorado, where he taught from 1985 until 2017. Tinker is a citizen of the wazhazhe udsethe / Osage Nation. For 25 years he served pro bono as the director and spiritual leader of Four Winds American Indian Council. He is also on the leadership council of the American Indian Movement of Colorado and continues to serve on the elders council of the Four Winds American Indian Council. He has also presented in forums across the continent and around the world.

In his best known work, American Indian Liberation, Tinker argues that, "The intellectual and religious realms have been crucial to colonial political and economic domination of indigenous peoples." He believes that Native American Christians need to separate themselves from the colonial thinking of European settlers but draw from Native American spirituality and its emphases on space, nature, and community. He developed this further in the co-authored book Native American Theology.

Tinker's recent work has also examined the historical and institutional controversy and surrounding an atrocity where a book of Christian history that was bound in the skin of an Indigenous Man and gifted to Iliff School of Theology. Although the human skin was removed and given to American Indian Movement representatives in the 1970s, a non-disclosure agreement silenced the institutional role played by the school where the book was displayed for eighty years. With the support of Thomas Wolfe, the current president of the Iliff School, Tinker has worked to build awareness about the book and the lingering ways that institutions benefit from their participation in colonialism.

== Works ==
=== Books/Journal ===
- Missionary Conquest: The Gospel and Native American Cultural Genocide (1993)
- Spirit and Resistance: Political Theology and American Indian Liberation (2004)
- American Indian Liberation: A Theology of Sovereignty (2008)
- co-editor of Native Voices: American Indian Identity and Resistance (2003)

=== Articles ===
1. “Weaponized christianity: missiology, jesus, the gospel, and Indigenous Genocide,” Handbook on Intercultural Theology and Missiology, edited by John Flett and Dorottya Nagy (T & T Clark, in press).
2. “How the Eurochristian Invasion of Turtle Island Created the Environmental Crises: Focus on an Early ‘Immigration’,” in Displacement Climes: Shifting Climates, Shifting People, edited by Miguel de la Torre (in press).
3. “The Corons and American Indian Genocide: Weaponizing Infectious Disease as the Continuation of a eurochristian Religious Project,” 2020 Hindsight: The Racial Realization and Religious Significance of the COVID-19 Pandemic, edited by Stacey M. Floyd-Thomas. (in press)
4. “Much Ado about Nothing,” in Faith and Resistance after Trump, edited by Miguel de la Torre (Orbis, 2021), pp. 184–192.
5. “Relationship—Not Ownership: Indigenous Lands and Colonial Occupation,” Tribal Studies (2021).
6. “Occupation in north America: States, Rule of Law, Language, and Indians,” in Resisting Occupation: A Global Struggle for Liberation, ed. by Mitri Raheb and Miguel A. de la Torre (Lexington Books, Fortress Academic, 2022), 175-193.
7. “jesus, the gospel, and Genocide,” in The Colonial Compromise: The Threat of the gospel to the Indigenous Worldview, edited by Miguel de la Torre (Lexington Books/Fortress Academic, December 2020). A volume of essays in honor of Tinker’s career.
8. “Discovery, St. Junípero, Lewis and Clark,” The New Polis (3 November 2020): https://thenewpolis.com/2020/11/03/discovery-st-junipero-lewis-and-clark-tink-tinker-wazhazhe-osage-nation/. This is a slightly revised version of an essay Tinker published in the mennonite journal Intotemak in 2016. Note below. Online publication also makes it more widely available.
9. “Religious Studies: The Final Colonization of American Indians,” Religious Theory, e-supplement to Journal of Cultural and Religious Theory (June 1, 2020): http://jcrt.org/religioustheory/2020/06/01/religious-studies-the-final-colonization-of-american-indians-part-1-tink-tinker-wazhazhe-udsethe/. And: Part 2 (June 9, 2020): http://jcrt.org/religioustheory/2020/06/09/religious-studies-the-final-colonization-of-american-indians-part-1-tink-tinker-wazhazhe-udsethe-2/.
10. “What Are We Going to Do with White People? The New Polis (December 17, 2019): https://thenewpolis.com/2019/12/17/what-are-we-going-to-do-with-white-people-tink-tinker-wazhazhe-osage-nation/.
11. “Osage Kettle Carriers: Marmitons, Scullery Boys, Deviants and Gender Choices,” The New Polis (July 24, 2019): http://thenewpolis.com/2019/07/24/osage-kettle-carriers-marmitons-scullery-boys-deviants-and-gender-choices-tink-tinker-wazhazhe-osage-nation/.
12. “’Damn it, he’s an Injun!’ Christian Murder, Colonial Wealth, and Tanned Human Skin,” The New Polis, January 21, 2019: http://thenewpolis.com/2019/01/21/damn-it-hes-an-injun-christian-murder-colonial-wealth-and-tanned-human-skin-tink-tinker-wazhazhe-udsethe/.
13. “The Earth, Property, Pipelines and Resistance: Waylaying Treaties,” Faith and Resistance in the Age of Trump, edited by Miguel de la Torre. Orbis, 2017. 174-182.
14. “The Doctrine of christian Discovery: Lutherans and the Language of Empire,” Journal of Lutheran Ethics, 17:2 (March, 2017): http://www.elca.org/JLE/Articles/1203?_ga=2.135755441.1678807210.1512268747-1739868796.1512268747.
15. “The Irrelevance of Euro-christian Dichotomies for Indigenous Peoples: Beyond Non-violence to a Vision of Cosmic Balance.” Peacemaking and the Challenge of Violence in World Religions. Irfan A. Omar and Joshua Burns, editors. Wiley-Blackwell, 2015. 206-229.
16. “Redskin, Tanned Hide: A Book of Christian History Bound in the Flayed Skin of an American Indian: The Colonial Romance, christian Denial and the Cleansing of a christian School of Theology,” Journal of Race and Ethnicity in Religion, Volume 5, Issue 9, 2014: http://www.raceandreligion.com/JRER/Volume_5_(2014)_files/Tinker%205%209.pdf.
17. “American Indians and Ecotheology: Alterity and Worldview.” In Eco-Lutheranism: Lutheran Perspectives on Ecology (ELCA Association of Teaching Theologians, Proceedings, 2012). Edited by Karla Bohmbach and Shauna Hannon. Lutheran University Press, 2013. pp. 69–84.
18. “American Indian Liberation: Paddling a Canoe Upstream.” In The Reemergence of Liberation Theologies: Models for the Twenty-first Century, edited by Thia Cooper. Palgrave, Macmillan, 2013. pp. 57–67.
19. “‘To the Victor Belong the Spoils’: An Afterword on Colonialist History.” In Buried in Shades of Night: Contested Voices, Indian Captivity, and the Legacy of King Philip’s War, by Billy J. Stratton. Univ. of Arizona Press, 2013. Pp.
20. “Why I Don’t Believe in a Creator.” In Buffalo Shout, Salmon Cry: Conversations on Creation, Land Justice, and Life Together, edited by Steve Heinrichs. Herald Press, 2013. pp. 167–179. Now online at: https://s3.amazonaws.com/iliff-edu/wp-content/uploads/2018/06/18155740/Tinker-Why-I-Do-Not-Believe-in-a-Creator-Conversations-on-Creation-Land-Justice-and-Life-Together.pdf.
21. "John Locke: On Property." In Beyond the Pale: Reading Christian Ethics from the Margins, edited by Stacey Floyd-Thomas and Miguel de la Torre. WJK, 2011. pp. 49–60.
22. "Decolonizing the Language of Lutheran Theology: Confessions, Mission, Indians and the Globalization of Hybridity." Dialog: A Journal of Theology, 50:2 (Summer, 2011): 195-207. Academic/library access: Dialog: Vol 50, No 2 (wiley.com).
23. "American Indians, Conquest, the Christian Story, and Invasive Nation-building." In Wading Through Many Voices: Toward A Theology of Public Conversation. Edited by Harold Recinos. Rowman and Littlefield, 2011. pp. 255–277.
24. “Towards an American Indian Indigenous Theology,” Ecumenical Review, 62.4 (December 2010): 340-351.
25. "An American Indian Cultural Universe: We Are All Related," in Kathleen Dean Moore and Michael P. Nelson, eds., Moral Ground. Trinity University Press, 2010.
26. "Jamestown as Romance and Tragedy: Abjection, Violence, Missiology, and American Indians.” Journal of Race and Ethnicity in Religion (March 2010): a peer-reviewed on-line journal at: http://www.raceandreligion.com/JRER/Articles_files/Jamestown%20as%20Romance%20and%20Tragedy.pdf%5B%5D.
27. “American Indian Theology: The American Indian Self and Theological Resistance to the Imperial Other.” In Liberation Theologies in the United States: An Introduction, edited by Anthony Pinn and Stacey M. Floyd-Thomas. NYU Press, 2010. pp. 168–180.
28. “American Indians and Liberation: Harmony and Balance,” in The Hope of Liberation in World Religions. Edited by Miguel de la Torre. Baylor University Press, 2008. pp. 257–273.
29. “Thief, Slave-Trader, Murderer: Christopher Columbus and Caribbean Population Decline,” co-authored with Mark Freeland. Wíčazo Ša Review (Spring 2008). pp. 25–50.
