= Jonathan Z. Smith =

American historian of religions (1938–2017)

- Smith, c. 2008
- Born: Jonathan Zittell Smith; November 21, 1938; New York City, New York, US
- Died: December 30, 2017 (aged 79)

Academic background
- Education: Haverford College; Yale University
- Thesis: The Glory, Jest and Riddle (1969)
- Influences: Ernst Cassirer; Émile Durkheim; Claude Lévi-Strauss

Academic work
- Discipline: History
- Sub-discipline: History of religion
- Institutions: University of Chicago
- Influenced: Christian K. Wedemeyer, Russell T. McCutcheon

Jonathan Zittell Smith (November 21, 1938 – December 30, 2017), also known as J. Z. Smith, was an American historian of religions. He was based at the University of Chicago for most of his career. His research included work on such diverse topics as Christian origins, the theory of ritual, Hellenistic religions, Māori cults in the 19th century, and the mass suicide in Jonestown, Guyana, as well as methodological studies on such common scholarly tools as description, comparison, and interpretation. An essayist, his works include Map Is Not Territory, Imagining Religion: From Babylon to Jonestown, To Take Place: Toward Theory in Ritual, Drudgery Divine: On the Comparison of Early Christianities and the Religions of Late Antiquity, Relating Religion: Essays in the Study of Religion, and a collection of his writings on pedagogy, On Teaching Religion.

== Life and career ==
Smith was born on November 21, 1938, in Brooklyn, New York City, and grew up in Manhattan. As a teenager, he desired to become an agrostologist. He graduated from Haverford College in 1960 with a Bachelor of Arts degree in philosophy. He also earned a Bachelor of Divinity degree from Yale Divinity School and a Doctor of Philosophy degree in the history of religions from Yale University in 1969, where he was their first degree candidate in this field; with a thesis on anthropological thought, focused on Sir James George Frazer, The Glory, Jest and Riddle: James George Frazer and The Golden Bough. After holding positions at Dartmouth College and UC Santa Barbara, he began teaching at the University of Chicago, where he served as Dean of the College from 1977 to 1982 and was appointed Robert O. Anderson Distinguished Service Professor of the Humanities. He still held that position as of 2008, and remained active in undergraduate teaching at least as recently as the autumn quarter 2011, teaching the course titled "Introduction to Religious Studies". He was elected member of the American Academy of Arts and Sciences in 2000, and served as president of the Society of Biblical Literature in 2008.

While at the College of the University of Chicago Smith also wrote on pedagogy and the reform of undergraduate education in the United States. This emphasis on teaching also affected Smith's output in another way—up until that point, much of his written work began as lectures, and most of his publications were essays. Smith's research focused on Western theories of difference ranging from contemporary accounts of alien abduction to Greek and Roman ideas about the way climate shapes human character.

He received the Quantrell Award.

Smith never used a computer. He typed or hand-wrote all of his papers. Furthermore, he despised the telephone and thought the cell phone was "an absolute abomination."

Smith died of lung cancer on December 30, 2017. He was survived by his wife Elaine, daughter Siobhan, and son Jason. After the news of Smith's death was announced, scholars of religion soon began more explicitly to reflect on the effects of his writings and work. The blog of the UK-based quarterly, Bulletin for the Study of Religion began an ongoing series of posts, from international scholars, concerning what they understood themselves to have learned from Smith.

== Comparison of religions ==
Intellectually, Smith was influenced by neo-Kantian thinkers, especially Ernst Cassirer and Émile Durkheim. He was also influenced by Claude Lévi-Strauss. Smith's dissertation focused on James Frazer's The Golden Bough and the method that Frazer used in the comparison of different religions. Later, much of Smith's work focused on the problem of comparison and how best to compare data taken from societies that are very different from one another. His most influential essay on this topic is perhaps "In Comparison a Magic Dwells".

== Books and selected works ==
- The Glory, Jest and Riddle: James George Frazer and The Golden Bough, PhD thesis, Yale University 1969 (unpublished)
- Map Is Not Territory: Studies in the History of Religions, University of Chicago Press, 1975 (paperback 1993): ISBN 0-226-76357-9
- Imagining Religion: From Babylon to Jonestown, University of Chicago Press, 1982 (paperback 1988): ISBN 0-226-76360-9
- To Take Place: Toward Theory in Ritual, University of Chicago Press, 1987 (paperback 1992): ISBN 0-226-76361-7
- "Dying and Rising Gods," Encyclopedia of Religion (New York, 1987), 4:521-27.
- Drudgery Divine: On the Comparison of Early Christianities and the Religions of Late Antiquity, University of Chicago Press, 1990 (paperback 1994): ISBN 0-226-76363-3
- The HarperCollins Dictionary of Religion (Jonathan Z. Smith, editor, William Scott Green, associate editor, with The American Academy of Religion), 1995: ISBN 0-06-067515-2
- Relating Religion: Essays in the Study of Religion, University of Chicago Press, 2004 ISBN 0-226-76387-0
- On Teaching Religion: Essays by Jonathan Z. Smith (ed. Christopher Lehrich), Oxford University Press, 2012 ISBN 9780199944293
- Reading J. Z. Smith: Essays and Interview, 1999–2010 (ed. Russell T. McCutcheon and Willi Braun), Oxford University Press, 2018 ISBN 9780190879082
- "Narratives into Problems": The College Introductory Course and the Study of Religion", The Journal of the American Academy of Religion

Professional and academic associations
Preceded by Katharine Doob Sakenfeld	President of the Society of Biblical Literature; 2008	Succeeded by David J. A. Clines
