= Margaret M. Mitchell =

American biblical scholar and professor of early Christianity (born 1956)

Margaret Mitchell
- Born: 1956 (age 69–70)

Academic background
- Education: University of Chicago
- Thesis: Paul and the rhetoric of reconciliation an exegetical investigation of the language and composition of 1 Corinthians (1989)
- Doctoral advisor: Hans Dieter Betz

Academic work
- Discipline: Early Christianity; New Testament
- Institutions: University of Chicago

Margaret M. Mitchell (born 1956) is an American biblical scholar and professor of early Christianity. She is currently Shailer Mathews Distinguished Service Professor at the University of Chicago Divinity School. Mitchell received her doctorate at the same institution in 1989, under the supervision of Hans Dieter Betz and Robert McQueen Grant. She also served as dean of the Divinity School from 2010 to 2015. In 2021 she served as president of the Studiorum Novi Testamenti Societas.

Mitchell has made important contributions to research on the letters of the Apostle Paul, particularly on those to the Corinthians, on early Christian rhetoric, and on John Chrysostom. She has served on the editorial board of the Journal of Biblical Literature and New Testament Studies, and is currently the co-editor of a number of series, including the Novum Testamentum: Supplements series (Brill Publishers) and the Writings from the Greco-Roman World text and translation series (Society of Biblical Literature). Forthcoming projects include a commentary in the Hermeneia series on the Second Epistle to the Corinthians. She was awarded a Guggenheim fellowship in 2010.

== Selected works ==
=== Thesis ===
- Mitchell, Margaret M. (1989). Paul and the rhetoric of reconciliation an exegetical investigation of the language and composition of 1 Corinthians (Ph.D.). Chicago, IL: University of Chicago. ISBN 9780521197953. OCLC 722335252.

=== Book ===
- ——— (2000). The Heavenly Trumpet: John Chrysostom and the Art of Pauline Interpretation. Hermeneutische Untersuchungen zur Theologie. Vol. 40. Tübingen: Mohr Siebeck. ISBN 9780664225100. OCLC 49527186.
- ——— (1991). Paul and the Rhetoric of Reconciliation: An Exegetical Investigation of the Language and Composition of 1 Corinthians. Hermeneutische Untersuchungen zur Theologie. Vol. 28. Tübingen: Mohr Siebeck. ISBN 9783161457944. OCLC 797505309. OCLC 782103693. - revision of author's thesis.
- ———; Greer, Rowan A. (2007). The "Belly-Myther" of Endor: Interpretations of 1 Kingdoms 28 in The Early Church. Writings from the Greco-Roman World. Vol. 16. Atlanta: Scholars Press. ISBN 9781435626942. OCLC 191683218.
- ——— (2010). Paul, the Corinthians, and the Birth of Christian Hermeneutics. Cambridge, UK: Cambridge University Press. ISBN 9780521197953. OCLC 496958988.
- ——— (2017). Paul and the Emergence of Christian Textuality: early Christian literary culture in context: collected essays. Volume I. Wissenschaftliche Untersuchungen zum Neuen Testament. Vol. 393. Tübingen: Mohr Siebeck. ISBN 9783161546167. OCLC 1018406215.

=== Edited by ===
- ———; Betz, Hans Dieter; Collins, Adela Yarbro, eds. (2001). Antiquity and Humanity: essays on ancient religion and philosophy : presented to Hans Dieter Betz on his 70th birthday. Tübingen: Mohr Siebeck. ISBN 9783161475856. OCLC 47852469.
- ———; Young, Frances M., eds. (2006–2009). The Cambridge History of Christianity (in 10 Volumes). Cambridge, UK: Cambridge University Press.
