= Martin Riesebrodt =

American sociologist

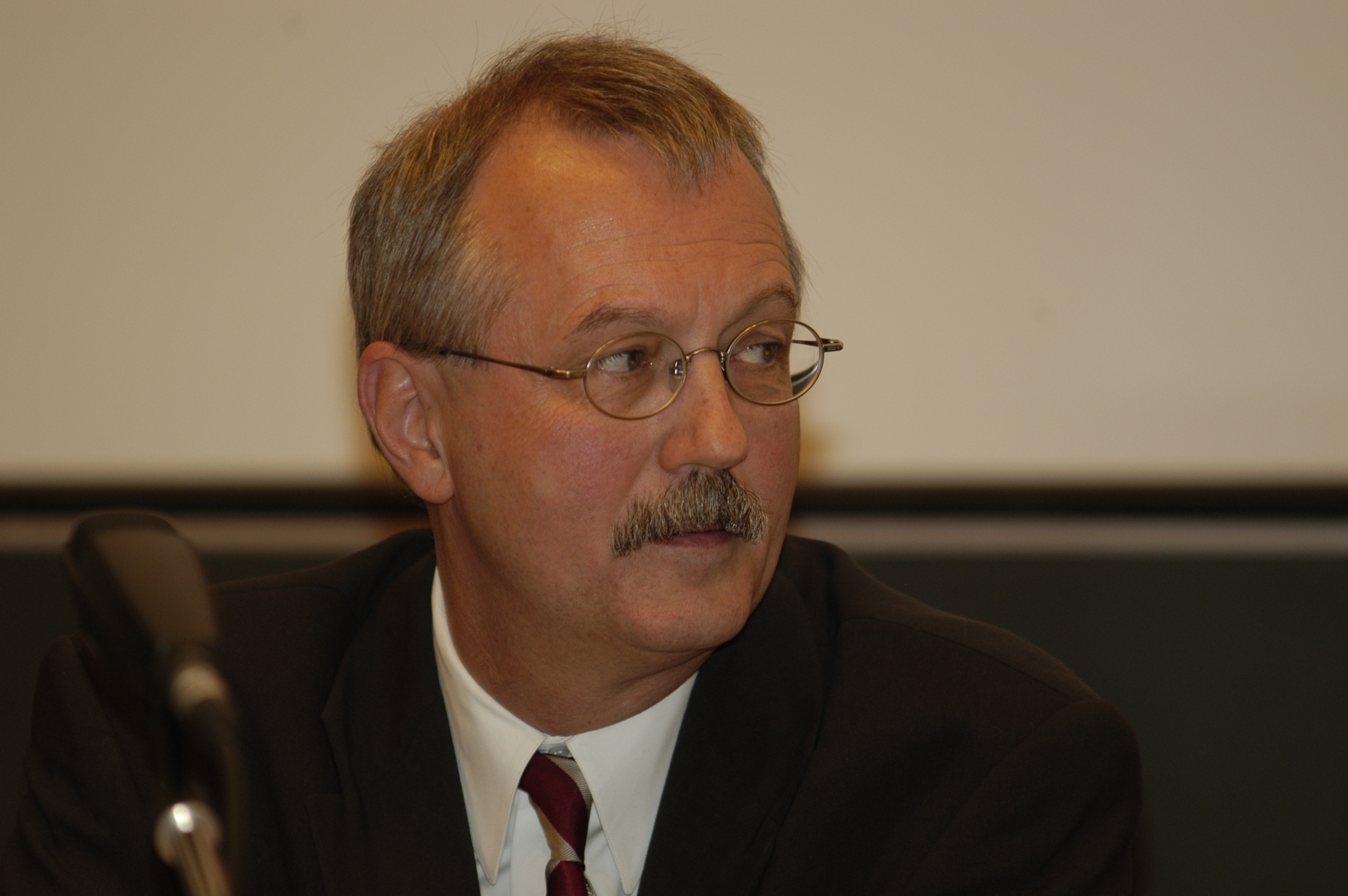
Martin Riesebrodt in 2003

Martin Riesebrodt (April 22, 1948 – December 6, 2014) was a German-American professor of sociology and politics at the Graduate Institute of International and Development Studies, in Geneva, Switzerland. He was also emeritus professor at the Divinity School and the Department of Sociology at the University of Chicago. He earned his doctorate at Heidelberg University, and his habilitation at LMU Munich.

In his book Cultus und Heilsversprechen, Riesebrodt examines the regeneration of religion and fundamentalism in the modern world. The book has been positively reviewed, one critic arguing that it is among the most important contributions to the sociology of religion in recent years. It was translated to English under the title The Promise of Salvation: A Theory of Religion.

== Bibliography ==
- The Promise of Salvation: A Theory of Religion (University of Chicago Press 2010)
- Die Rückkehr der Religionen. Fundamentalismus und der 'Kampf der Kulturen' (C.H. Beck 2000)
- Pious Passion: The Emergence of Fundamentalism in the United States and Iran (University of California Press 1998)
