= Donald E. Messer =

American theologian and author

Donald E. Messer (born 1941) is an American United Methodist theologian and author, and former college and seminary president. He is known for his work to combat world hunger and HIV/AIDS.

Messer earned a Ph.D. from Boston University in social ethics. He was president of Dakota Wesleyan University from 1971 to 1981, and president of Iliff School of Theology from 1981 to 2000. He was named both President Emeritus and the Henry White Warren Professor Emeritus of Practical Theology at The Iliff School of Theology. As of 2013, Messer is the Executive Director of the Center for the Church and Global AIDS.

Concern for the escalating global HIV/AIDS pandemic has prompted Messer to travel and speak in Asia, Africa and Latin America, as well as to initiate a Center for the Church and Global AIDS that serves as a catalyst for Christian involvement in the major issues related to global HIV and AIDS, world hunger, and clean water. Throughout the world, the Center supports various projects of education, prevention, care and treatment, aimed at helping to create an AIDS-free and hunger-free world. Messer has also spent time and energy helping gain support for education around the world with special attention to The United Methodist Seminary in Russia.

At the 5th International Conference on AIDS India in Chennai in 2005, he was honored by The Tamil Nadu Dr. M.G.R. Medical University with a "Lifetime Achievement Award" for his humanitarian work. Among other awards received over the years, Messer was named one of America's "Ten Outstanding Young Men" in 1975 by the United States Junior Chamber (Jaycees).

== Marriage and Family Life ==
In 1964, Donald Messer married Bonnie Jeanne Nagel. Together they had two kids, Christine Messer, now Christine Gallagher, and Kent Donald Messer. The family moved from South Dakota to Denver, Colorado.

== Books ==
- McGovern, George; Robert J. Dole; Donald E. Messer (October 1, 2005). Ending Hunger Now: A Challenge to Persons of Faith. Minneapolis: Augsburg Fortress. ISBN 978-0-8006-3782-8.
- Messer, Donald E. (March 2004). Breaking The Conspiracy of Silence: Christian Churches and the Global AIDS Crisis. Minneapolis: Augsburg Fortress. ISBN 978-0-8006-3641-8.
- Messer, Donald E. (2001). Send Me? The Itineracy in Crisis. Abingdon Press. ISBN 978-0-687-36910-2.
- Messer, Donald E. (February 1989). Contemporary Images in Christian Ministry. Abingdon Press. ISBN 978-0-687-09505-6.
- Messer, Donald E. (January 1984). Christian Ethics and Political Action. Judson Press. ISBN 978-0-8170-1018-8.
