= Iliff, Colorado =

Town in Colorado, United States

Town of Iliff, Colorado
- Statutory Town
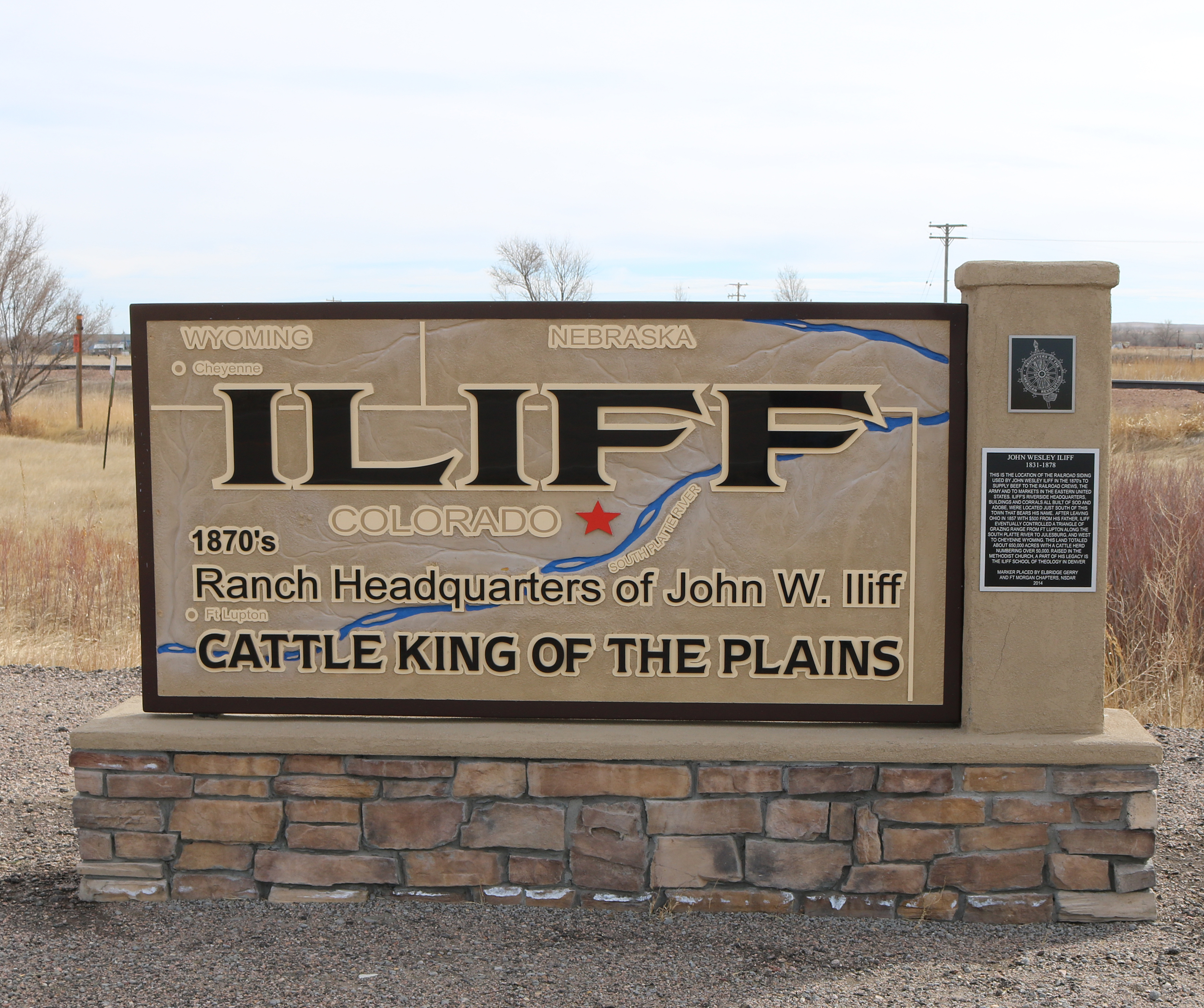
- Iliff, Colorado sign at the west end of town.

- Location of Iliff in Logan County, Colorado.
- Coordinates: 40°45′33″N 103°03′58″W
- Country: United States
- State: Colorado
- County: Logan
- Incorporated (town): February 20, 1906

Government
  - Type: Statutory Town

Area
  - Total: 0.19 sq mi (0.49 km^{2})
  - Land: 0.19 sq mi (0.49 km^{2})
  - Water: 0 sq mi (0.00 km^{2})
- Elevation: 3,835 ft (1,169 m)

Population (2020)
  - Total: 246
  - Density: 1,300/sq mi (500/km^{2})
- Time zone: UTC-7 (Mountain (MST))
  - Summer (DST): UTC-6 (MDT)
- ZIP code: 80736
- Area code: 970
- FIPS code: 08-38590
- GNIS feature ID: 2412788
- Website: www.facebook.com/p/Iliff-CO-100069572164938/

The Town of Iliff is a Statutory Town located in Logan County, Colorado, United States. The population was 246 at the 2020 United States census.

== History ==
=== Founding ===
The town was named for John Wesley Iliff, a cattleman who owned a ranch near the town site. Iliff (1831-1878), known as the 'Cattle King of Colorado', arrived during the 1859 gold rush and built one of the largest cattle operations in the American West. By the mid-1870's, he owned approximately 35,000 head of cattle and 15,558 acres of rangeland in northeastern Colorado. He supplied beef to Union Pacific Railroad construction crews, army posts, and mining towns, and was one of the wealthiest men in Colorado when he died in 1878.

=== Natural disasters ===
The people of Iliff have proven to be a resilient folk, surviving a blizzard in 1949 and a flood in 1965. Iliff resides on the fertile banks of the South Platte River. The South Platte has been a cornerstone to the community. The January 2, 1949 blizzard affected northeastern Colorado and led to Operation Haylift, a U.S. Air Force relief effort. The June 1965 South Platte River flood passed through the region between Sterling and Julesburg from June 14-20, 1965.

=== Railroad ===
Union Pacific Railroad system map showing the network that connected Iliff to regional markets

The Union Pacific Railroad completed its line between LaSalle and Julesburg in 1881, providing crucial transportation for shipping cattle and agricultural products. The town was officially platted in 1887, the same year Logan County was carved from Weld County. According to historical records, Iliff was 'so busy with cattle-shipping that its saloon was converted into a land and loan office.' The 1900 census recorded 397 residents in Iliff.

=== Sugar beet era ===
The region's economy transformed dramatically after 1905 when Sterling Sugar Company built a beet-processing factory near Sterling, triggering 'unprecedented growth' throughout Logan County. Sugar beet acreage in Logan County grew from 5,352 acres in 1910 to 14,623 acres by 1929. The industry attracted immigrant labor, including German Russians beginning in 1902 and Mexican immigrants from 1900 to 1930. Japanese workers also came to the Iliff area between 1903 and 1907, with families such as the Kosuge-Shichirobei family settling in nearby Merino before moving to Iliff. This prosperity period supported Iliff's business development and population growth.

=== Growth period ===
During its early 20th century growth period, Iliff developed various businesses and institutions to serve its agricultural community. St. Catherine's Catholic Church was constructed in 1927, with an adjacent rectory building. The town also featured a bank building and dance hall/opera house dating from the early 1900s, along with a town pump installed in 1890 that remains in the center of town. At its peak, the community supported various businesses including a Baptist church, school, newspaper (the Iliff Independent), hotel, theater, drugstore, and agricultural services.

=== Decline ===
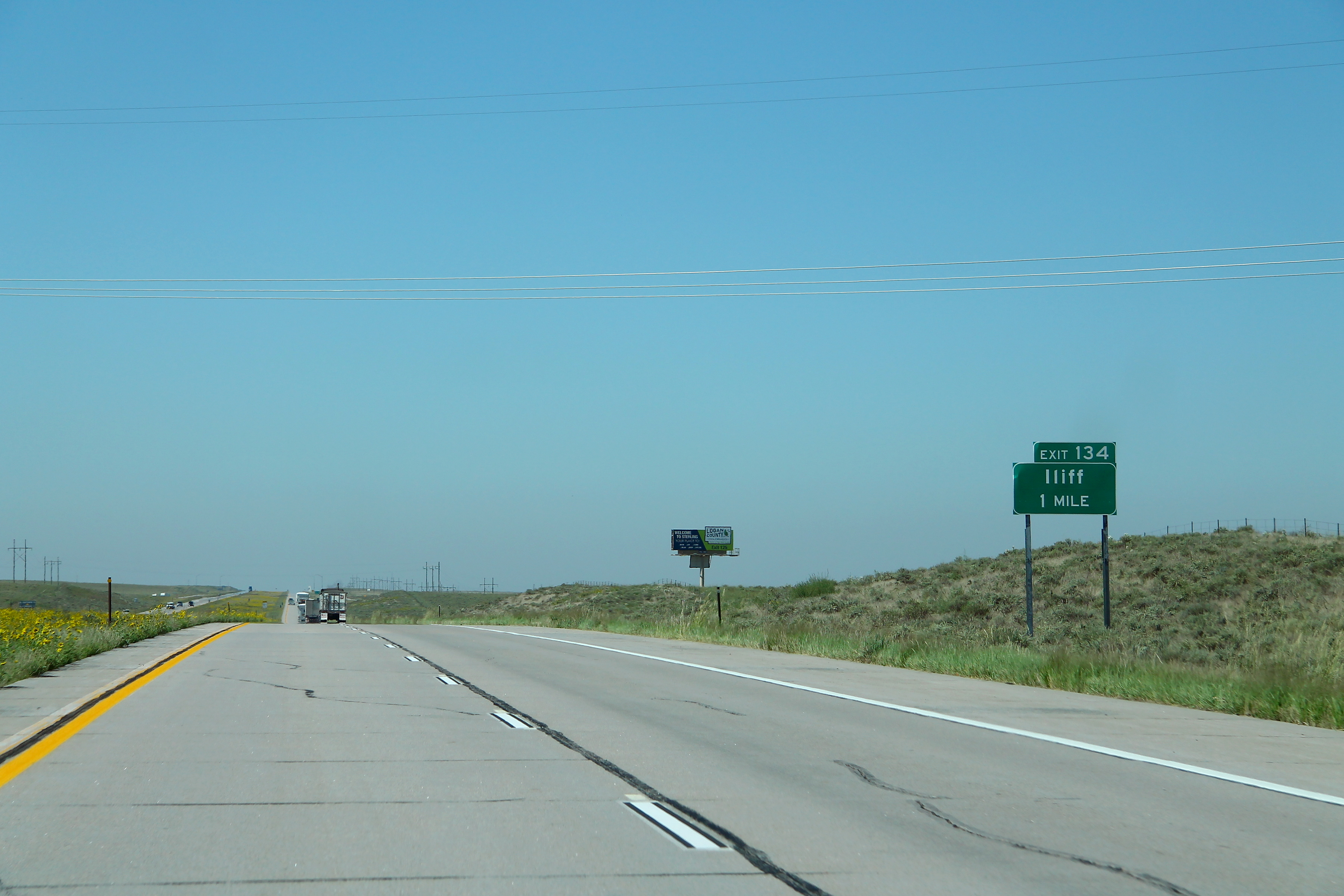
Interstate 76 exit sign for Iliff, showing the highway that bypassed the town in 1958

The growth declined during the depression, and again during World War II. In 1957 there were eleven businesses that slowly diminished with more people willing to drive the 12 miles to Sterling. The town's population peaked at 266 in the 2010 census before declining to 246 by 2020. The 1985 bankruptcy of Great Western Sugar Company and closure of the Sterling factory marked the end of the sugar beet era that had sustained the regional economy for eight decades. Interstate 76 was constructed beginning in August 1958 (originally designated Interstate 80S, renumbered in 1976), which bypassed Iliff and drew traffic away from State Highway 138, accelerating the town's economic decline.

== Geography ==
According to the United States Census Bureau, the town has a total area of 0.2 square miles (0.52 km^{2}), all of it land.

== Demographics ==
Historical population
Census	Pop.	Note	%±
1920	238		—
1930	266		11.8%
1940	322		21.1%
1950	235		−27.0%
1960	204		−13.2%
1970	193		−5.4%
1980	218		13.0%
1990	174		−20.2%
2000	213		22.4%
2010	266		24.9%
2020	246		−7.5%
U.S. Decennial Census

== See also ==
- Sterling, CO Micropolitan Statistical Area
