= Daniel A. Arnold =

American scholar and philosopher (born 1965)

- Born: 1965 (age 60–61); Paris, France
- Citizenship: United States
- Education: University of Chicago; Columbia University; Iliff School of Theology; Carleton College
- Awards: American Academy of Religion's Award for Excellence in the Study of Religion (Constructive-Reflective Studies), 2007; Toshihide Numata Book Prize in Buddhism
- Scientific career
- Fields: Philosophy of Religion, Buddhist Studies
- Workplaces: University of Chicago; McGill University

Daniel A. Arnold (born 1965) is an American scholar and philosopher. He is Associate Professor of the Philosophy of Religions at the Divinity School of the University of Chicago.

His work focuses on Indian Buddhist philosophy, which he engages in a constructive and comparative way. His particular interests are in Indian Buddhist Madhyamaka, and in the appreciation of Indian Buddhist philosophy as an integral part of the broader tradition of Indian philosophy. In this regard, he has been especially interested in issues disputed between Buddhist schools and the orthodox Brahmanical school of Pūrva Mīmāṃsā.

His first book, Buddhists, Brahmins, and Belief: Epistemology in South Asian Philosophy of Religion (2005), won the American Academy of Religion's Award for Excellence in the Study of Religion in the Constructive-Reflective Studies category for 2006. His second book, Brains, Buddhas, and Believing: The Problem of Intentionality in Classical Buddhist and Cognitive-Scientific Philosophy of Mind (2012) won the Toshihide Numata Book Prize in Buddhism.

He has been an editor for the academic listserv H-Buddhism, and serves on the editorial boards of, and acts in a consulting capacity for a number of academic journals and presses.

He is member of the American Oriental Society, the American Academy of Religion, and the International Association of Buddhist Studies.

== Education ==
- Ph.D. (2003, University of Chicago Divinity School)
- M.A. (1997, Iliff School of Theology)
- M.A. (1992, Columbia University)
- B.A. (1988, Carleton College)

== Books ==
- Buddhists, Brahmins and Belief: Epistemology in South Asian Philosophy of Religion (Columbia University Press, 2005)
- Brains, Buddhas, and Believing: The Problem of Intentionality in Classical Buddhist and Cognitive-Scientific Philosophy of Mind (Columbia University Press, 2012)

== Academic appointments ==
- Associate Professor of the Philosophy of Religion, University of Chicago Divinity School (2011- )
- Assistant Professor of the Philosophy of Religion, University of Chicago Divinity School (2004–2011)
- Assistant Professor of Religious Studies, McGill University (2003–2004)
