= McLuney Creek =

Stream in Perry County, Ohio, U.S.

Coordinates: 39°45′20″N 82°5′29″W

McLuney Creek is a stream in Perry County, Ohio.

McLuney Creek was named for a pioneer who settled there.

== See also ==
- List of rivers of Ohio
