= Henry White Warren =

American Methodist Episcopal bishop and author

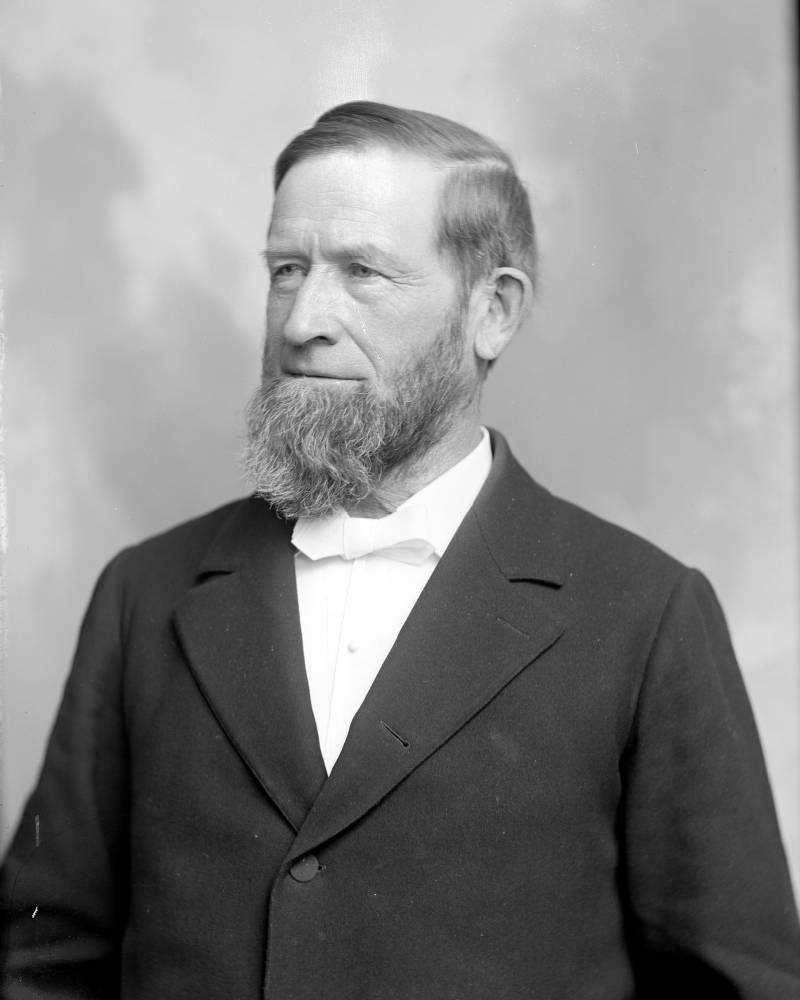
- Born: January 4, 1831; Williamsburg, Massachusetts
- Died: July 23, 1912 (aged 81); Denver, Colorado
- Resting place: Fairmount Cemetery
- Occupations: Clergyman, writer
- Spouses: Diantha Kilgore (m. 1855; died 1867) Elizabeth Iliff (m. 1883)
- Children: 3

Henry White Warren (1831–1912) was an American Methodist Episcopal bishop and author. William Fairfield Warren was his brother.

== Biography ==
Henry White Warren was born at Williamsburg, Massachusetts on January 4, 1831. He graduated in 1853 at Wesleyan University, Middletown, Conn. He taught ancient languages at Wilbraham Wesleyan Academy, Wilbraham, Mass. (1853–55), and then entered the New England Conference (1855). On April 6, 1855, he married Miss Diantha Kilgore, in Lowell, Massachusetts. In 1863 he was a member of the Massachusetts Legislature.

His wife died June 21, 1867, after having borne three children: Carrie, Henry and Ellen. After serving churches about Boston he was transferred to the Philadelphia Conference (1871) and was elected Bishop (1880).

When he visited Colorado for the first time in 1879 he met the widow of John Wesley Iliff, Elizabeth Iliff. They were married on December 27, 1883, in the Evans Memorial Chapel. He was a co-founder of the Iliff School of Theology in Denver, CO.

He was editor of The Study and published:

- Sights and Insights (1874)
- The Lesser Hymnal (1877)
- Studies of the Stars (1878)
- Recreations in Astronomy (1879)
- The Bible in the World's Education (1892)
- Among the Forces (1898)
- Fifty-two Memory Hymns (1908)

On May 5, 1912, Bishop Warren retired from the Iliff School of Theology. On July 23, 1912, he died of pneumonia at his home in the University Park neighborhood of Denver. He was buried at Fairmount Cemetery in Denver.

== See also ==
- List of bishops of the United Methodist Church
