= Speeches of Barack Obama =

Speeches of President of the United States

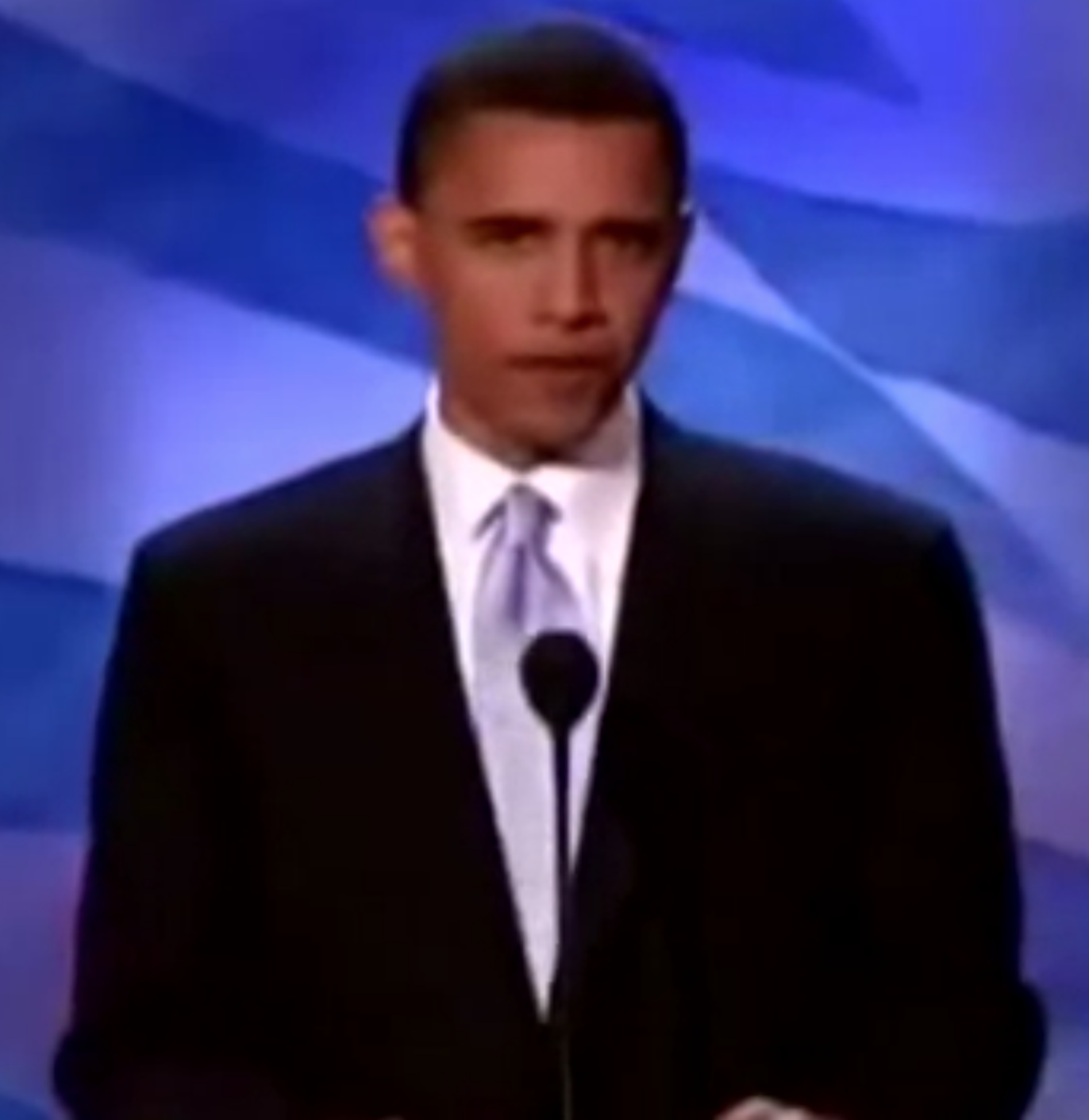
Barack Obama delivering the keynote address at the 2004 Democratic National Convention

Barack Obama served as the 44th president of the United States from 2009 to 2017. Before his presidency, he served in the Illinois Senate (1997–2004) and the United States Senate (2005–2008).

It was during his campaign for the United States Senate that he first made a speech that received nationwide attention; he gave the keynote address at the 2004 Democratic National Convention. and stated "there is not a liberal America and a conservative America—there is the United States of America". Obama began to run for president just three years after that speech. In response to a political controversy involving race during the primary campaign, he delivered his "A More Perfect Union" speech, which was widely seen as a critical point in the campaign.

Obama was elected to the presidency in 2008 and subsequently re-elected in 2012. Among the hundreds of speeches he has delivered since then include seven State of the Union addresses, two victory speeches, a speech to the Islamic world in Egypt early in his first term, and a speech following the shooting of Congresswoman Gabby Giffords.

On January 10, 2017, We Are The Change We Seek, a collection of Obama's greatest speeches selected and introduced by columnist E.J. Dionne and MSNBC host Joy-Ann Reid was published by Bloomsbury Publishing.

== 2004 Democratic National Convention keynote address ==
The keynote address at the 2004 Democratic National Convention (DNC) was given by then Illinois state senator, United States Senate candidate, and future president Barack Obama on the night of Tuesday, July 27, 2004. His unexpected landslide victory in the March 2004 Illinois U.S. Senate Democratic primary had made him overnight a rising star within the national Democratic Party, started speculation about a presidential future, and led to the reissue of his memoir, Dreams from My Father. His convention keynote address was well received, which further elevated his status within the Democratic Party and led to his reissued memoir becoming a bestseller.

Obama first met Democratic presidential candidate John Kerry in the spring of 2004, and was just one of several names considered for the role of keynote speaker at the party's convention that summer. After being alerted in early July that he had been chosen to deliver the address, Obama largely wrote the speech himself, with later edits from the Kerry presidential campaign. Delivered on the second night of the DNC in just under 20 minutes, the address included both a biographical sketch of Obama, his own vision of America, and the reasons for his support of Kerry for the presidency. Unlike almost all prior and all subsequent convention keynote addresses, it was not televised by the commercial broadcast networks, and was only seen by a combined PBS, cable news and C-SPAN television audience of about 9 million. Since its delivery, several academics have studied the speech, both for the various narratives it describes as well as its implications for racial reconciliation.

== 2008 A More Perfect Union ==
"A More Perfect Union" is the name of a speech delivered by Senator Barack Obama on March 18, 2008 in the course of the contest for the 2008 Democratic Party presidential nomination. Speaking before an audience at the National Constitution Center in Philadelphia, Obama was responding to a spike in the attention paid to controversial remarks made by the Reverend Jeremiah Wright, his former pastor and, until shortly before the speech, a participant in his campaign. Obama framed his response in terms of the broader issue of race in the United States. The speech's title was taken from the Preamble to the United States Constitution.

Obama addressed the subjects of racial tensions, white privilege, and race and inequality in the United States, discussing black "anger", white "resentment", and other issues as he sought to explain and contextualize Wright's controversial comments. His speech closed with a plea to move beyond America's "racial stalemate" and address shared social problems.

On March 27, 2008, the Pew Research Center called the speech "arguably the biggest political event of the campaign so far," noting that 85 percent of Americans said they had heard at least a little about the speech and that 54 percent said they heard a lot about it. The New Yorker opined that the speech helped elect Obama as the president of the United States.

== 2008 Presidential Election Victory Speech ==
Following his victory in the 2008 United States presidential election, President-elect Barack Obama gave his victory speech at Grant Park in his home city of Chicago, on November 4, 2008, before an estimated crowd of 240,000. Viewed on television and the Internet by millions of people around the globe, Obama's speech focused on the major issues facing the United States and the world, all echoed through his campaign slogan of change. He also mentioned his grandmother, who had died two nights earlier.

== 2009 Inaugural Address ==
Delivered on January 20, 2009.

== February 2009 Address to a Joint Session of Congress ==
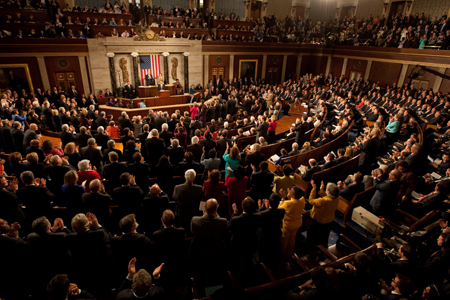
Obama addressing Congress

United States President Barack Obama delivered a speech to a joint session of the 111th United States Congress on February 24, 2009. It was not an official State of the Union address. Obama's first State of the Union Address was the 2010 State of the Union Address. The speech was delivered on the floor of the chamber of the United States House of Representatives in the United States Capitol. Presiding over this joint session was the House Speaker, Nancy Pelosi. Accompanying the speaker of the House was the president of the United States Senate, Joe Biden, the vice president of the United States.

President Obama discussed the recently passed $787 billion American Recovery and Reinvestment Act of 2009 as well as the Troubled Assets Relief Program, the state of the economy, and the future of the country.

Attorney General Eric Holder was the designated survivor and did not attend the address in order to maintain a continuity of government. He was sequestered at a secret secure location for the duration of the event.

== 2009 A New Beginning ==
"A New Beginning" is the name of a speech delivered by United States President Barack Obama on June 4, 2009, from the Major Reception Hall at Cairo University in Egypt. Al-Azhar University co-hosted the event. The speech honors a promise Obama made during his presidential campaign to give a major address to Muslims from a Muslim capital during his first few months as president.

White House Press Secretary Robert Gibbs indicated that Egypt was chosen because "it is a country that in many ways represents the heart of the Arab world." Egypt is considered a key player in the Middle East peace process as well as a major recipient of American military and economic aid. Reuters reporter Ross Colvin reported that the speech would attempt to mend the United States' relations with the Muslim world, which he wrote were "severely damaged" during the presidency of George W. Bush.

== September 2009 Address to a Joint Session of Congress ==
United States President Barack Obama discussed his plan for health care reform in a speech delivered to a joint session of the 111th United States Congress on September 9, 2009 at 8:00 PM (EDT). The speech was delivered to Congress on the floor of the chamber of the United States House of Representatives in the United States Capitol. House Speaker Nancy Pelosi presided over the joint session and was accompanied by the president of the United States Senate, Joe Biden, the vice president of the United States. Energy Secretary Steven Chu was chosen as the designated survivor and did not attend the speech.

== 2009 Address to the United Nations General Assembly ==
Delivered on September 23, 2009.

== 2010 State of the Union Address ==
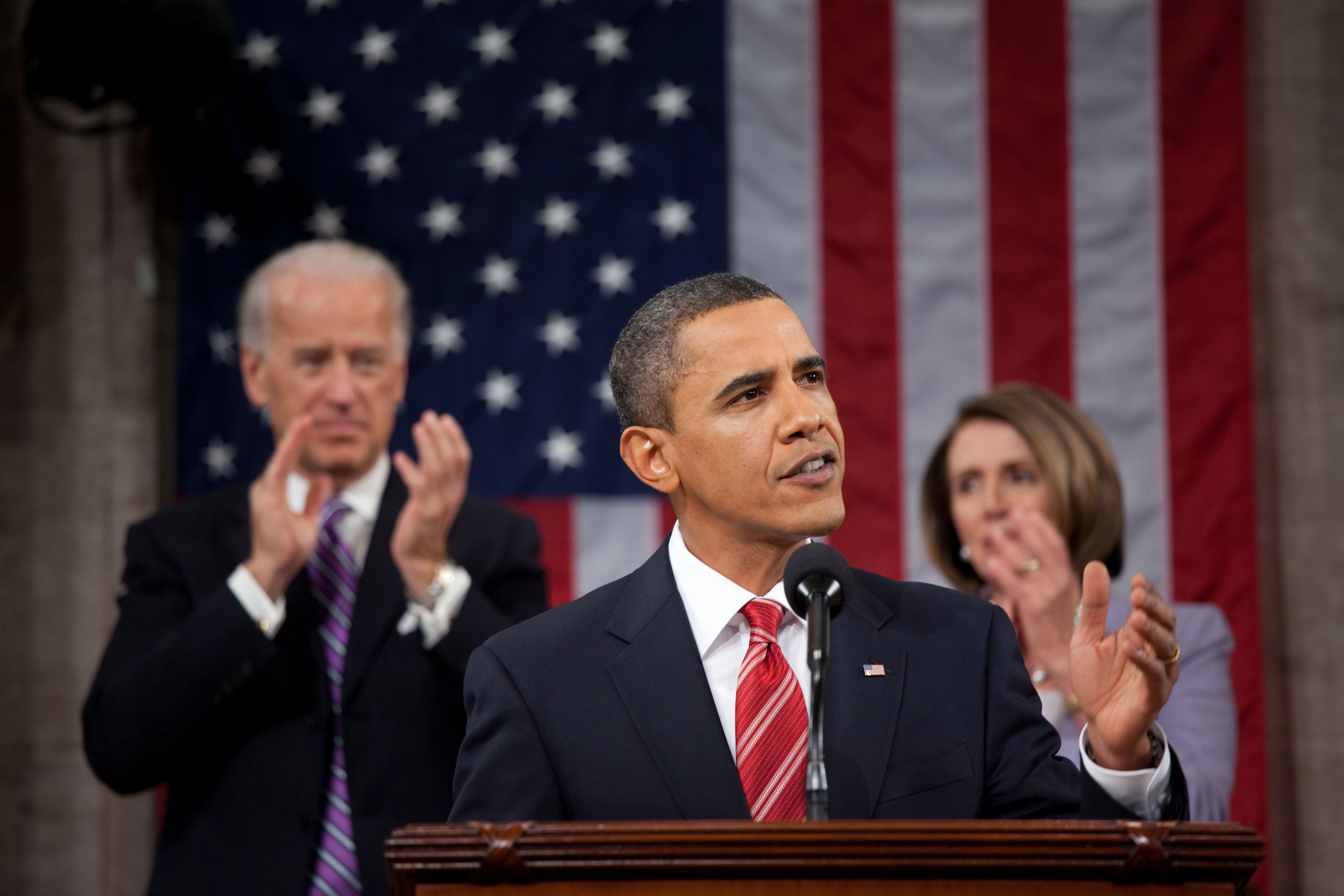
President Obama delivering the State of the Union to the United States Congress with Vice President Joe Biden and House Speaker Nancy Pelosi

The 2010 State of the Union Address was given by United States President Barack Obama on January 27, 2010, to a joint session of Congress. It was aired on all the major networks starting at 9 pm ET. It was Obama's first State of the Union Address, though the president did give a non-State of the Union address to a joint session of Congress a month after taking office in 2009.

The speech was delivered in the United States House of Representatives in the United States Capitol. As always, the presiding officers of the Senate and the House of Representatives, Vice President Joe Biden (as Senate President) and House Speaker Nancy Pelosi sat behind the president.

The theme for President Obama's speech was "Rescue, Rebuild, Restore – a New Foundation for Prosperity". Among the topics that Obama covered in his speech were proposals for job creation and federal deficit reduction.

Newly inaugurated Virginia Governor Bob McDonnell delivered the Republican response following the speech from the floor of the House of Delegates at the Virginia State Capitol in front of over 300 people.

== 2010 Space policy speech at Kennedy Space Center ==
This speech was delivered on April 15, 2010, at the Kennedy Space Center.

== 2010 Address to the United Nations General Assembly ==
Delivered on September 23, 2010.

== 2011 Tucson memorial speech ==
President of the United States Barack Obama delivered a speech at the Together We Thrive: Tucson and America memorial on January 12, 2011, held in the McKale Center on the University of Arizona campus.

It honored the victims of the 2011 Tucson shooting and included themes of healing and national unity. Watched by more than 30 million Americans, it drew widespread praise from politicians and commentators across the political spectrum and from abroad.

== 2011 State of the Union Address ==
The 2011 State of the Union Address was a speech given by President Barack Obama at 9 p.m. EST on January 25, 2011, in the chamber of the United States House of Representatives. In this joint session Obama outlined his "vision for an America that's more determined, more competitive, better positioned for the future—an America where we out-innovate, we out-educate, we out-build the rest of the world; where we take responsibility for our deficits; where we reform our government to meet the demands of a new age."

== 2011 Birth Certificate statement ==
Obama delivered a speech at the White House Briefing Room on April 20, 2011. He stated that the release of his birth certificate is a settled issue saying that the American people "didn't care" nor were concerned about this. Obama blamed partisan politics and said this release is no different than any earlier release.

== September 2011 Address to a Joint Session of Congress ==
Delivered on September 8, 2011.

== 2011 Address to the United Nations General Assembly ==
Delivered on September 21, 2011.

== 2012 State of the Union Address ==
The 2012 State of the Union Address was a speech given by President Barack Obama, from 9 p.m. to 10:17 p.m. EST on Tuesday, January 24, 2012, in the chamber of the United States House of Representatives. In his speech, he focused on education reform, repairing America's infrastructure with money not used on the Iraq War, and creating new energy sources in America.

== 2012 "You didn't build that" ==
The speech took place in Roanoke, Virginia, on July 13, 2012.

== 2012 Address to the United Nations General Assembly ==
Delivered on September 25, 2012.

== 2012 Speech to the Clinton Global Initiative ==
Barack Obama's speech to the Clinton Global Initiative in 2012 took place on September 25, 2012. The speech was on the subject of human trafficking, which Obama referred to as "modern slavery". He stated that he did not use the term "slavery" lightly, knowing that this word conjures painful memories of previous forms of slavery in the United States. In the speech, he told his administration to oppose human trafficking to a greater extent than the administration had done previously. He also encouraged people to develop technology to combat human trafficking, and specifically put a call out to college students. He also told the story of former human trafficking victim Sheila White, who, in 2003, was battered next to the Port Authority of New York and New Jersey without anyone even asking her if she needed help. Opening night of the human-trafficking-themed Canadian play She Has a Name in Edmonton, Alberta coincided with Obama's speech. JD Supra called it a "landmark speech [that] is reflective of the fact that human trafficking and forced labor have become key priorities" for people wishing to address the human rights issues that result from business operations. California Against Slavery founder Daphne Phung was pleased with Obama's speech. As part of the Obama administration's followup to the speech to the Clinton Global Initiative, there was a 25-person discussion at the White House about how to eliminate human trafficking globally.

== 2012 Presidential Election Victory Speech ==
Delivered on November 6, 2012.

== 2013 Inaugural Address ==
Delivered on January 21, 2013.

== 2013 State of the Union Address ==
Delivered on February 12, 2013.

== 2013 Speech at the Brandenburg Gate Berlin ==
Delivered on June 19, 2013.

== 2013 "Trayvon Martin could have been me 35 years ago" ==
President Obama delivers a speech in the White House Press Room on July 19, 2013. (Note: Transcript of President Obama's Remarks * Remarks by the President on Trayvon Martin Video of President Obama's Remarks * President Obama Speaks on Trayvon Martin)

On July 19, 2013, President Obama gave a speech in place of the usual White House daily briefing normally given by White House Press Secretary Jay Carney. In the 17-minute speech, President Obama spoke about public reaction to the conclusion of the George Zimmerman trial, racial profiling, and the state of race relations in the United States. The speech was widely covered on news networks, and made headlines across the country. During this speech, made six days after George Zimmerman was found not guilty, Obama said, "Trayvon Martin could have been me 35 years ago." That phrase became the most frequently quoted portion of the speech in the news cycle that followed. The speech marked a major turning point for Barack Obama, who had previously shied away from addressing issues of racial tension during his presidency. During the remarks, President Obama spoke about the many African-Americans who have experienced racial profiling, including himself.

There are very few African American men in this country who haven't had the experience of being followed when they were shopping in a department store. That includes me. There are very few African American men who haven't had the experience of walking across the street and hearing the locks click on the doors of cars. That happens to me—at least before I was a senator. There are very few African Americans who haven't had the experience of getting on an elevator and a woman clutching her purse nervously and holding her breath until she had a chance to get off. That happens often.

President Obama also spoke about stand-your-ground laws and pondered that, if Trayvon Martin had been armed, he might possibly have legally stood his ground on the sidewalk and shot George Zimmerman because he felt threatened. Based on that ambiguity, Obama said that perhaps such laws should be examined.

== 2013 Speech at the Lincoln Memorial Reflecting Pool ==
On August 28, 2013, the 50th anniversary of the March on Washington for Jobs and Freedom and Martin Luther King Jr.'s "I Have A Dream" speech was commemorated by an all day event featuring various speakers including President Barack Obama and John Lewis, the only speaker from the original rally to remain living.

== 2013 Address to the United Nations General Assembly ==
Delivered on September 24, 2013.

== 2014 State of the Union Address ==
Delivered on January 28, 2014.

== 2014 Address to the United Nations General Assembly ==
Delivered on September 24, 2014.

== 2015 State of the Union Address ==
Delivered on January 20, 2015.

== 2015 Selma Anniversary ==
Obama spoke on March 7, 2015 to mark the 50th anniversary of the Selma to Montgomery Marches, lauded unsung heroes and everyday Americans that stood up for justice. According to leading George W. Bush speechwriter Michael Gerson, the speech "falls into the category of speeches that every child should read in school" and is cited by the Washington Post as the Obama speech which will hold up best for posterity.

== 2015 Eulogy for Clementa Pinckney ==
After the Charleston church shooting, during which state senator Clementa C. Pinckney and eight other victims were gunned down by a white supremacist, Obama went to the College of Charleston on June 26, 2015 to deliver the eulogy for senator Pinckney while addressing bigger issues about race relations and civil rights in the United States. Speech had Obama singing "Amazing grace" with the emotional crowd. A part of this song in speech was sampled by British band Coldplay in their album "A Head Full of Dreams".

== 2015 Address to the United Nations General Assembly ==
Delivered on September 28, 2015.

== 2015 Address to the Nation by the President ==
On December 6, 2015, after a terrorist attack on San Bernardino, California, Obama delivered a live Address to the Nation by the President from the Oval Office. In the address, he declared the shooting an act of terrorism, referring to the shooters as having "gone down the dark path of radicalization" and embracing a "perverted version of Islam." Obama said that "the threat from terrorism is real, but we will overcome it" and promised that the United States will "destroy ISIL and any other organization that tries to harm us." Obama also outlined the ongoing fight against ISIL (including U.S. airstrikes, financial sanctions, and targeted special operations) and urged Americans to not give in to fear. It was just the third speech from the Oval Office in the seven years of Obama's presidency.

== 2016 State of the Union Address ==
Delivered on January 12, 2016.

== 2016 Hiroshima Speech ==
On May 27, 2016, Obama became the first sitting US president to visit Hiroshima, bombed by the US in 1945. He made a speech at the Hiroshima Peace Park to a small audience of around 100 people, including hibakusha (atomic bomb survivors). His speech was followed by one by Japanese prime minister Shinzō Abe.

== 2016 Democratic National Convention ==
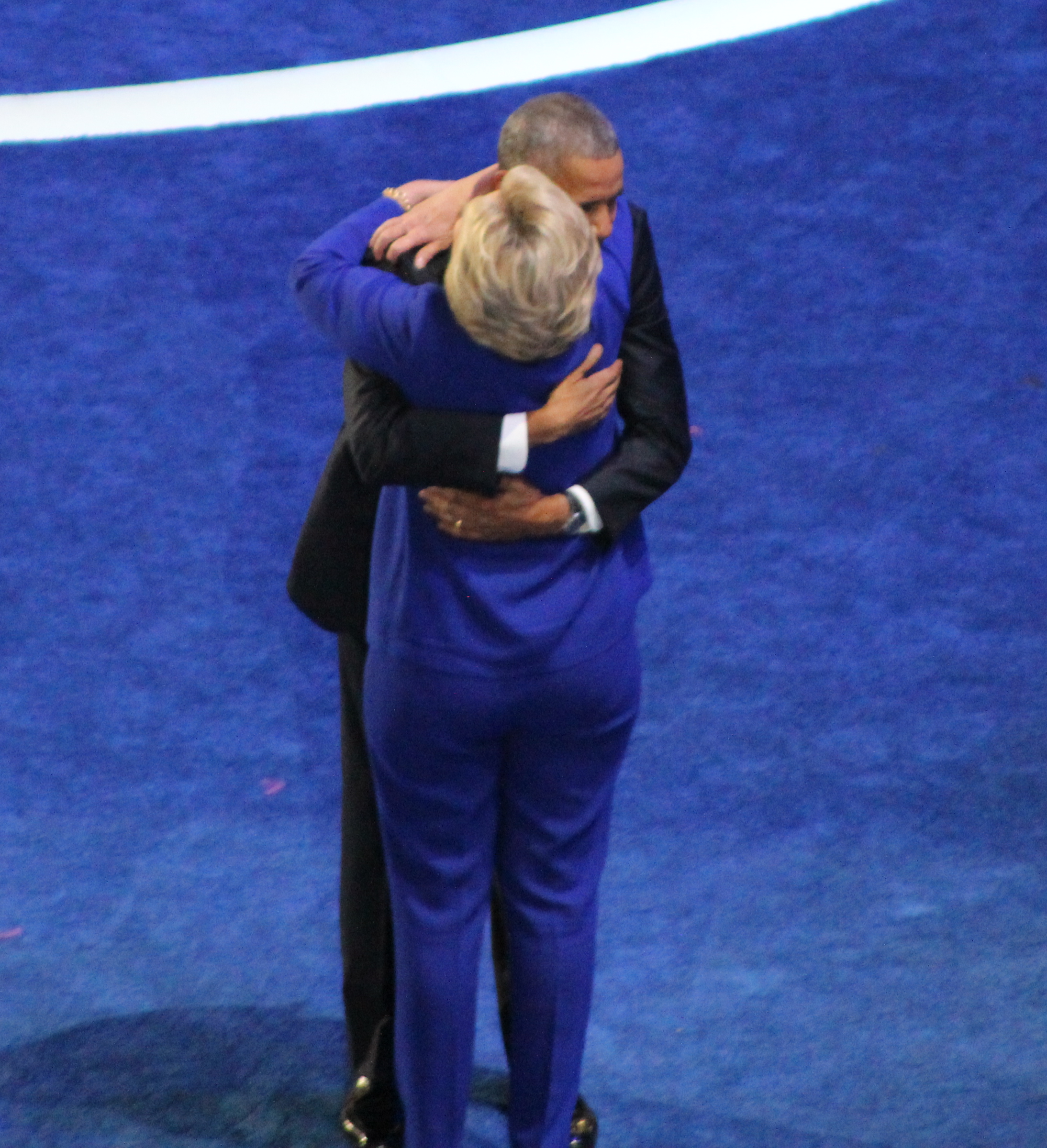
President Obama hugging Hillary Clinton

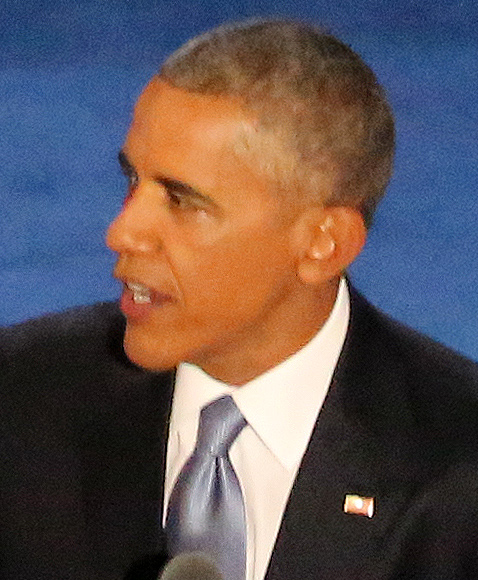

"You know, nothing truly prepares you for the demands of the Oval Office. Until you've sat at that desk, you don't know what it's like to manage a global crisis or send young people to war. ... But Hillary's been in the room. She's been part of those decisions."

— Barack Obama in the 2016 Democratic National Convention (July 27, 2016)

In one of the last major speeches of his presidency, Obama strongly endorsed Clinton as the Democratic nominee for president on July 27, 2016, saying "there has never been a man or woman more qualified than Hillary Clinton. Not me, not Bill, nobody!" Obama contrasted his and Clinton's hopeful view of America with that of Republican nominee Donald Trump, which he called "deeply pessimistic." Obama argued that Trump was unqualified for the office, and was attempting to use fear to get elected. Michael Grunwald of Politico called it a "stirring but fundamentally defensive speech." Conservative blogger Erick Erickson tweeted "I disagree with the President on so much policy and his agenda, but appreciate the hope and optimism in this speech." After the speech, Clinton appeared on the stage for the first time in the convention, embracing her 2008 primary rival.

== 2016 Hillary Clinton Presidential Campaign speeches ==
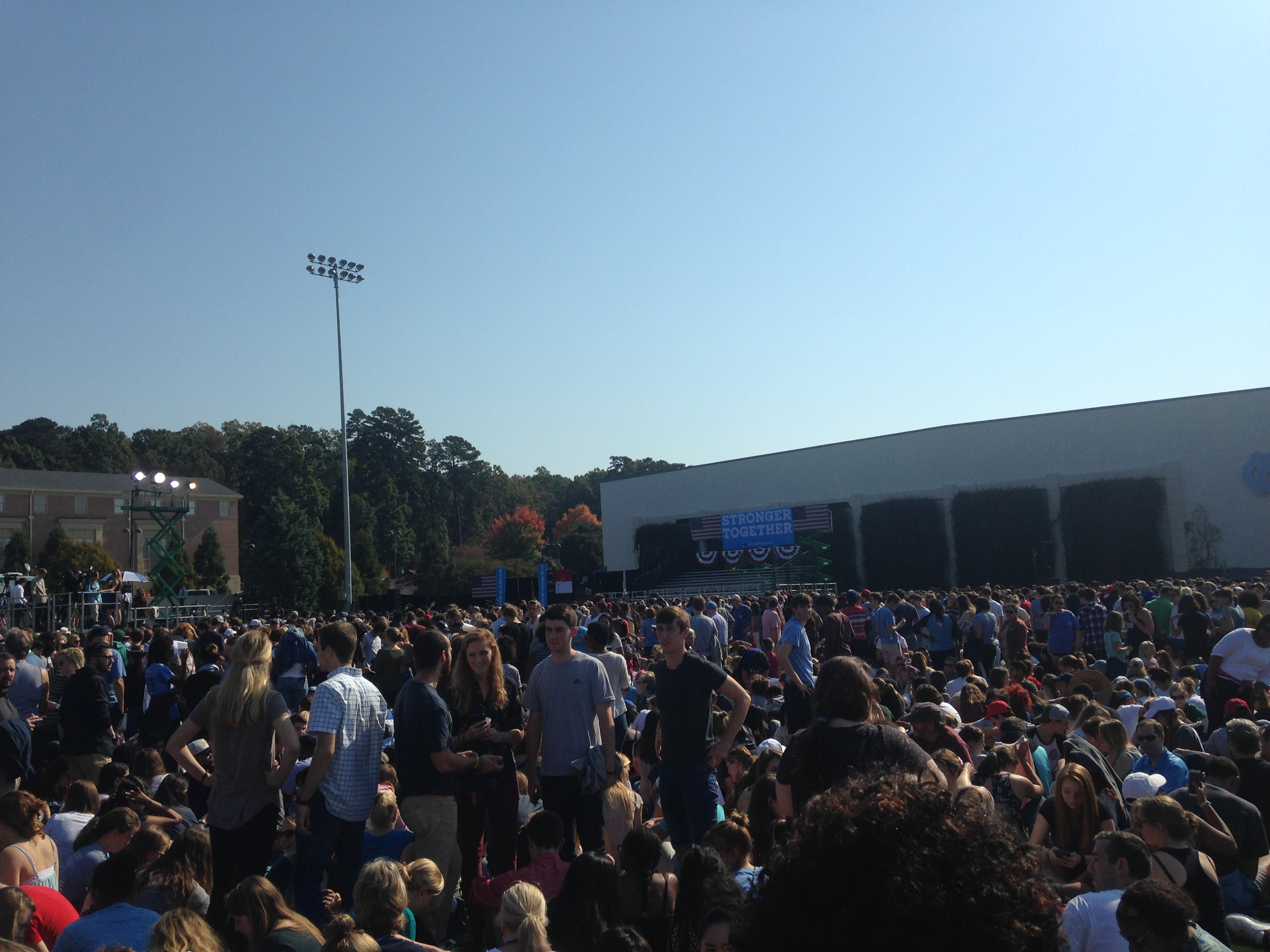
People waiting on Hooker Fields at the University of North Carolina at Chapel Hill, for Obama to arrive and give a speech

Barack Obama gave eighteen speeches on behalf of the Clinton Campaign, many of which were in battleground states, such as North Carolina and New Hampshire. His last speech on behalf of the campaign was delivered at a rally at Independence Hall in Philadelphia on the eve of Election Day on November 7, 2016.

== 2016 Address to the United Nations General Assembly ==
Delivered on September 20, 2016.

== 2017 Farewell Address ==
Barack Obama gave a farewell speech on January 10, 2017, stating many achievements made during his presidency and thanking the American people for their hard work they had done and would continue to do.

== 2020 HBCU Commencement speech ==
On May 16, 2020, Obama gave a virtual commencement speech for some 27,000 students from 78 historically black colleges and universities (HBCU). He said, "You've got more tools, technology, and talents than my generation did. No generation has been better positioned to be warriors for justice and remake the world."
