= The Double Conscious: Race & Rhetoric =

- Directed by: Matt Reaves
- Produced by: Matt Reaves
- Edited by: Glenn D. Toof
- Release date: 2011
- Running time: 140 min.
- Country: United States
- Language: English

The Double Conscious: Race & Rhetoric is a 2011 educational documentary compilation of speeches, by a number of prominent figures, dealing with race and racism in America.

== Speeches ==
- Atlanta Exposition Speech by Booker T. Washington
- Civil Rights Address by John F. Kennedy
- I Have a Dream by Martin Luther King Jr.
- Oxford Union Debate by Malcolm X
- "Can We All Get Along?" by Rodney King
- "The Day of Jerusalem's Fall" by Jeremiah Wright
- A More Perfect Union (speech) by Barack Obama
- Department of Justice African American History Month Remarks by Eric Holder
