= The Speech (Sharpley-Whiting book) =

2009 book by Tracy Denean Sharpley-Whiting

The Speech: Race and Barack Obama's "A More Perfect Union"
- Author: T. Denean Sharpley-Whiting
- Language: English
- Subject: Political convictions, race relations
- Publisher: Bloomsbury USA
- Publication date: August 2009
- Publication place: United States
- Media type: Print (Paperback)
- Pages: 288
- ISBN: 978-1-59691-667-8
- OCLC: 306806376
- Dewey Decimal: 973.932092 22
- LC Class: E184.A1 S698 2009

The Speech: Race and Barack Obama's "A More Perfect Union" is a 2009 non-fiction book edited by T. Denean Sharpley-Whiting, author of several books on race and director of Vanderbilt University's African American and Diaspora Studies, concerning the "A More Perfect Union" speech of then-Senator Barack Obama.

== The speech ==
The speech was delivered on March 18, 2008 in the course of the contest for the 2008 Democratic Party presidential nomination. Speaking before an audience at the National Constitution Center in Philadelphia, Pennsylvania, Obama was responding to a spike in the attention paid to controversial remarks made by the Reverend Jeremiah Wright, his former pastor and, until shortly before the speech, a participant in his campaign. Obama framed his response in terms of the broader issue of race in the United States. The speech's title was taken from the Preamble to the United States Constitution. Obama addressed the subjects of racial tensions, white privilege, and race and inequality in the United States, discussing black "anger," white "resentment," and other issues as he sought to explain and contextualize Wright's comments. His speech closed with a plea to move beyond America's "racial stalemate" and address shared social problems. On March 27, 2008, the Pew Research Center called the speech "arguably the biggest political event of the campaign so far," noting that 85 percent of Americans said they had heard at least a little about the speech and that 54 percent said they heard a lot about it. Eventually, The New Yorker opined that the speech helped elect Obama as the President of the United States. The speech itself was widely praised as eloquent and honest and concerned racial issues in the United States. Obama, of African-American ancestry, is the first non-white US President.

== Content ==
The book is a collection of original essays from "leading black thinkers" – journalists, scholars and public intellectuals – exploring literary, political, social and cultural issues of Obama's speech. In addition to the essays, the full text of the speech is included as well as a journalistic look at the issues of race in the 2008 Democratic primaries and general election. The book is titled The Speech because Sharply-Whiting's contact at the publisher kept referring to Obama's speech as "the speech, the speech" and prompted a book to be written on the subject. She was also inspired by the core components of institutionalized racism, structural inequalities and race relations in America that was sparked by the Jeremiah Wright controversy.

T. Denean Sharpley-Whiting and groups of the essayists were brought together on several occasions around the US with a few of them being recorded and one being aired on national cable television. In October 2009, Book TV (C-SPAN) aired a program of T. Denean Sharpley-Whiting and five of the essayists, filmed at Vanderbilt University in September 2009, reading excerpts and talking about the collection and their views on Obama's speech as well as the ideas of a post-racial America. The same month the Schomburg Center for Research in Black Culture at the New York Public Library presented a panel discussion of the book with several contributors.

== Contributors ==
Essays are from "contributors of diverse backgrounds and vocations" including;

- Associate Professor of African American and Diaspora Studies and author Omar H. Ali, "Obama and the Generational Challenge"
- ta-Nehisi Coates
- Michael Eric Dyson
- political commentator Keli Goff
- Biblical scholar and theologian Obery M. Hendricks Jr., "A More Perfect (High-Tech) Lynching."
- columnist Derrick Jackson, contributed three parts; "Wright Stuff Wrong Time", the build-up to the speech, the press pool reaction to the speech and the ways the speech took on its own life during the campaign.
- Glenn Loury
- author and playwright Adam Mansbach, "Toward a More Perfect Union?"
- journalist, author and cultural critic Joan Morgan, "Black Like Barack"
- Orlando Patterson
- novelist Alice Randall, "Barack in the Dirty, Dirty South."
- columnist Connie Schultz
- sociolinguist Geneva Smitherman
- professor, researcher and consultant Gilman Whiting
- sociologist William Julius Wilson

== Reception ==
The Los Angeles Times noted, "Overall, "The Speech," though somewhat uneven, is a rich landscape of opinion on the state of race and Obama's singular relationship to it." Publishers Weekly said the collection is "scholarly without being dry, the book offers a way forward from what has become a stalemate between a "color-blind" white America that sees racism as a problem solved in the 1960s and a nation of ethnic minorities that experiences daily its structural inequities." Salon called the book an "eye-opening collection of essays" although they also called it "a provocative, if uneven set of essays".
