= Trinity United Church of Christ =

African American church in Chicago

Coordinates: 41.721928°N 87.634227°W

- Trinity United Church of Christ
- Country: US
- Denomination: United Church of Christ

History
- Founded: December 3, 1961

Trinity United Church of Christ is a predominantly African-American megachurch with more than 8,500 members. It is located in the Washington Heights community on the South Side of Chicago. It is the largest church affiliated with the United Church of Christ, a predominantly white Christian denomination with roots in Congregationalism, which historically branched from early American Puritanism.

The church's early history coincided with the American civil rights movement, subsequent murder of Martin Luther King Jr., and the tumultuous period that engulfed the civil rights movement after King's death due to intense competition among actors over who would carry King's mantle. During that tumultuous period, an influx of radical black Muslim groups had begun to headquarter in Chicago, and Trinity sought to recontextualize Christianity through black theology in order to counter the influence of radical black Muslim leaders, who taught that it was impossible to be both black and Christian.

In early 2008, as part of their presidential election coverage, news media outlets and political commentators brought Trinity to national attention when controversial excerpts of sermons by the church's long-time former pastor Jeremiah Wright were broadcast to highlight Democratic presidential candidate Barack Obama's pastoral relationship with Wright and the church. Obama responded with a speech, A More Perfect Union, which addressed the criticisms and largely alleviated them from popular political criticisms at the time. On 31 May 2008 Obama severed links with the church, over comments by Wright and visiting priest Michael Pfleger.

Trinity is best known today for its national and international social programs on behalf of the disadvantaged, although in its earliest days such outreach did not figure into its mission.

== Background and history ==
=== Social and religious context ===
Patterns of migration among both blacks during the Great Migration of African Americans between 1910 and 1940, and among whites, are an important part of the social context in which Trinity was founded. Another is the threat that radical black nationalism and black Islam posed to Christianity's influence among Chicago blacks, as well as to blacks nationwide. As these movements gained ground among Chicago blacks, Trinity sought to turn the attention of blacks back to Christianity.

==== 1910 through 1940s ====
Beginning around 1910, the Great Migration of African Americans occurred as many thousands of blacks migrated northward from the south. A great many settled on Chicago's southside. When they arrived, they brought with them the forms of Christianity they had practiced in the South. As elsewhere in the United States, Chicago blacks of the time faced serious discrimination in typically every area of their existence.

In the early 1930s, Nation of Islam leader Elijah Muhammad moved his embroiled religion's headquarters from Detroit to Chicago. Mixing elements of the Bible and the Qur'an, Elijah Muhammad taught that Africans were the Earth's first and most important people. He prophesied that a time was coming when African Americans would be fully vindicated, released from their various oppressions, and brought into full freedom within their own geographical state. For this to actualize, however, Elijah Muhammad taught that blacks had to radically separate from all whites. In addition, he proclaimed that blacks needed to live a moral life.

By the 1940s, the Nation of Islam's radical message had drawn in thousands of Chicago's blacks, many who had converted from one of the forms of Christianity their forebears brought northward to Chicago (see Trinity in comparative perspective, below, for a discussion of the various forms).

==== 1950s through 1960 ====
Another of the contextual backdrops of Trinity is a pattern of migration that occurred in Chicago during the 1950s and 1960s, when middle-class whites began vacating urban areas for surrounding suburbs. As whites in southern Chicago migrated in large numbers to suburbs, upwardly mobile blacks from the "Black Belt" of Chicago's South Side migrated in, while non-mobile blacks remained in the South Side.

Meanwhile, by 1960, the Nation of Islam national spokesperson Malcolm X had founded Mr. Muhammad Speaks in Chicago to help the continued spread of the Nation of Islam message. The newspaper achieved a circulation of over 600,000, making it one of the most prominent black American newspapers of the time. By this time, Nation of Islam ideology held a quite significant sway over Chicago blacks.

=== Founding ===
It was within the above social context that Trinity came into being.

=== 1961 through 1966: under Kenneth B. Smith ===
On December 3, 1961, twelve middle-class black families, most descendants of migrants to Chicago during The Great Migration of African Americans, met for worship in a Chicago elementary school. Prior to the recent migration of whites to the suburbs, blacks had found it extremely difficult to move into middle-class surroundings in Chicago due to segregated housing patterns and homeownership discrimination (also see Racial steering). At the time of the 3 December meeting, Chicago's Halsted Street marked "the color line".

Sidenote:
Congregationalist worship at Trinity, 1960s

During the late 19th century, Congregationalist missionaries, working through the American Missionary Association, established numerous black colleges and universities throughout the U.S. south and north. They insisted that educated blacks eliminate displays of emotion during singing and preaching. This practice widely persisted through much of the 1960s and was carried over into black Congregationalist churches; some AMA-derived churches in the UCC still use a more restrained liturgy to this day. Worship services at Trinity during the 1960s followed the standard order of service for Congregationalist churches: prayers, followed by liturgy and hymns from The Pilgrim Hymnal, followed by a well-organized homily, followed by a benediction, confined to one hour in total. There was no shouting, hand waving, or displays of emotions. One of Trinity's black ministers said, from the pulpit, "We will have no 'niggerisms' in our services."

Trinity's first pastor, Kenneth B. Smith, was appointed by the Chicago Congregational Christian Association of the United Church of Christ (formed only in 1957) to expand the denomination toward southern Chicago, where blacks had recently begun to migrate from the "Black Belt" of Chicago's South Side to the more southerly urban areas whites had recently abandoned for the suburbs. The expressed vision of the association was to have a church for middle-class blacks, who would later merge with a congregation of suburban whites and have white and black co-pastors; in other words, an explicitly integrationist aim. Two successful African-American Congregational churches, Good Shepherd and Park Manor, had been started earlier in the twentieth century some distance to the north in the older South Side neighborhoods, so officials were probably expecting Trinity to emulate those previous developments. Smith came to the new church from an associate pastorate at Park Manor.

Although the vision was bold for the time, and a similar vision had been followed by other pockets of blacks both inside and outside of Chicago, it the same time produced apprehension within Trinity's upwardly mobile blacks, since some blacks in Chicago had had their homes burned for transgressing the color line. Moreover, the vision failed to address the many blacks who were still unable to reach upward mobility—those still on the South Side, those in the projects on the other side of Halsted Street, blacks who did not figure into the Association's vision because they were not considered "the right kind of black people".

Considerably later, the first African American conference minister of the United Church of Christ, the Rev. Dr. W. Sterling Cary, discussed the Association's disinterest in more detail. Cary wrote "Historically, the Association made special efforts to seek out 'high potential' churches within the Black community," which he said were understood as groups of blacks likely willing to be culturally assimilated into the forms and functions of worship of the Chicago Congregational Christian Association, with its strong Puritan heritage. American religion historian Julia Speller summarizes, "It was this racial reality that informed the planting of Trinity on the South Side of Chicago."

With the church's vision still maturing, Smith remained as pastor and led the growing congregation, while noting two things. Firstly, that the church's affiliation with a white denomination provided his congregants with a sense of unity and purpose within the mainline religious tradition of America (see Origins of the United Church of Christ). Secondly, the congregation began to find a kindred spirit with the denomination's commitment to justice and equality, as congregant activism began to emerge. Smith pointed to the march from Montgomery to Selma in 1965 under Martin Luther King Jr. as an event that fueled that activism, noting his congregants made picket signs and joined a Chicago area march in symbolic solidarity with southern blacks. However, Speller notes that the congregation's concern for the voting rights of southern blacks "stood in stark contrast to their obvious blind spot of the Association's position on church growth among African Americans in Chicago—one that supported only middle-class churches".

This period of the church culminated when plans to merge with a white congregation fell through—"whites were not much interested in integration" at the time, as Jason Byassee (editor at The Christian Century) notes—and the black congregation moved into its first church building in 1966. Seating two-hundred, it was located among the growing community of southern Chicago's middle-class blacks, east of the color line. Meanwhile, the Association continued its push for the church to focus ministry toward middle-class blacks.

After leaving Trinity, Smith became pastor of Good Shepherd Church and president of Chicago Theological Seminary.

=== 1966 to 1971: under Willie J. Jamerson ===
Sidenote:
A view of race in 1968 Chicago

"Following the assassination of the Rev. Martin Luther King Jr...our family moved into a racially changing Chicago community, where the vestiges of racism literally stood in our way. Racism manifested itself in insurance redlining, predatory lending practices and religious authorities working to maintain a line of segregation. The local activist Catholic priest declared no 'niggers' were allowed across Ashland Avenue... Out of this experience of brokenness and spiritual hope...black liberation theology emerged. The irrationality of racism and injustice provided the roots of an African-American theology focused on life in the present world.... The political, social and economic realities of African-American people get merged into the religious experience and are articulated through a message that is spiritual and social-speaking to the whole person." —Larry Pickens

Trinity's second pastor arrived a short time later, just as the Civil Rights Movement reached its peak. The Rev. Willie J. Jamerson, who came from Howard Congregational Church (UCC) in Nashville, Tennessee (a church founded by the American Missionary Association), brought "a desire to comfort the afflicted and afflict the comfortable", while "perhaps being more drawn to the role of prophet than that of priest", as he said, although Jamerson wound up doing much more comforting as a priest than afflicting as a prophet. As Jamerson recounted, the church continued its decline in membership, due to the constriction of vision that resulted from what he described as the church's continued major purpose to affirm the middle-class Congregationalism of its members. According to Speller, this foundational focus experienced another significant crack when Martin Luther King Jr. was assassinated in 1968, which subsequently brought many changes within black communities—another of Trinity's contextual backdrops.

As Speller explains, "The failure of the civil rights movement to usher in an era of genuine integration and harmony between the races turned into a search for an alternative experience of purpose and belonging for many African Americans." Corresponding with this search, a small rift began to form among Trinity's congregants, one that was also occurring in other predominantly black churches in the U.S. at the time. As the influence of the civil rights movement began to diminish in wake of King's assassination, the Black Power movement rushed in to fill the void, and some blacks, including a few at Trinity, became attracted to the validation the movement gave to their life and religious experiences. Other blacks, however, including most at Trinity, felt that a strategy of gradualism would eventuate in an America that honored achievements regardless of race. According to Speller, the majority of Trinity's congregants sided with gradualist notions, and "held tenaciously to their Congregational tradition, finding unity in their connection to American Protestantism and purpose in the lifestyle of black 'middle-classness'." (sic)

By 1972, however, Trinity's membership had dwindled from its peak of 341 (in 1968–69) down to 259 members (perhaps 100 of them active), and no one could pinpoint the cause. Jamerson soon resigned to take a position as a schoolteacher, and Trinity was faced with possibly closing its doors.

=== 1971 to 1972: under Reuben A. Sheares II ===
The church instead opted to bring on the Rev. Reuben A. Sheares II as interim pastor. According to Speller, Sheares's brief tenure with Trinity marked an important shift in the congregation's sense of purpose. Together with Trinity's remaining leaders, Sheares sought to discover the reasons behind Trinity's dramatic decline in membership and then work a remedy. As recounted by a key Trinity lay leader at the time, Vallmer E. Jordan, the small core of leaders concluded that "for years we had prided ourselves on being a middle-class congregation within a mainline denomination, but suddenly the values within the black community had shifted. Aspirations for integration and assimilation were being replaced by those of black pride and separation." Byassee fills in details by pointing out that Chicago had long since become an organizing center for militant black religious groups like The Nation of Islam and The Black Hebrew Israelites, who strenuously argued that "black" and "Christian" were contradictory terms. Many blacks had been leaving Christianity as a result.

Trinity's leaders had thus discovered the reasons for its decline in membership. As a congregation, Trinity would thus need to inaugurate a "shift" in how it viewed both itself and its mission—they needed to let blacks know, both those inside and outside its walls, that Christianity was not at all just a religion for whites. To begin this change, Sheares coined the motto "Unashamedly Black and Unapologetically Christian". Contextualizing the motto, Speller, herself black, informs that shame about being black has been "part and parcel of the black experience in America" (sic), and that blacks have historically hid their shame behind a variety of coping strategies and behaviors. Martin E. Marty, an emeritus professor of religious history, further explains, "For Trinity, being 'unashamedly black' does not mean being 'anti-white.' [...] Think of the concept of 'unashamedly': tucked into it is the word 'shame'." (sic) Underlying the idea, according to Marty, is a diagnosis "of 'shame', 'being shamed', and 'being ashamed' as debilitating legacies of slavery and segregation in society and church." Marty also explains that the Afrocentrism contained in the statement "should not be more offensive than that synagogues should be 'Judeo-centric' or that Chicago's Irish parishes be 'Celtic-centric'." Speller informs that the motto "has remained as a reminder of not only who [Trinitarians] are but Whose they are, continuing to emphasize both meaning and belonging".

In addition to Sheares's new motto, Jordan crafted a new mission statement that encapsulated the church's new vision to be

a source of spiritual sustenance, security, and inspiration; that those participating in our spiritual-social process [may] be strengthened in their commitment...to serve as instruments of God and church in our communities and the world, confronting, transforming and eliminating those things in our culture that lead to the dehumanization of persons and tend to perpetuate their psychological enslavement.

As Trinity sought a new pastor to lead growth, they gave the mission statement to each applicant.

=== 1972 to early 2008: under Jeremiah Wright ===
Jeremiah Wright, the son of a long-tenured Philadelphia Baptist minister, interviewed for the Trinity pastorate on December 31, 1971. Jordan recalls that Wright exuded excitement and vision for the church's new mission statement, and that Wright's response to the question "How do you see the role of the Black Church in the black struggle?" (sic) indicated he was the only possible candidate for Trinity. With the church also impressed with Wright's educational credentials—Wright held graduate degrees in English studies and divinity and was studying for a doctorate in religious history—he was shortly confirmed as the new pastor.

==== Context and challenges ====
Speller points out that Wright's arrival at Trinity coincided with the height of the U.S. Black Consciousness Revolution (also see South African Black Consciousness Movement) and additionally contends that Wright was keenly aware of the challenges that this deeply racialized context presented to Trinity. During graduate school Wright, as Bayassee notes, argued strenuously against radical black Islamic groups who had been drawing blacks away from Christianity by asserting that the religion was inherently racist and only for whites. To recontextualize the Christian message for the new context and time in which Wright perceived the church itself to be within, Wright, the author claims, anticipated that he would need to co-opt the positive elements of the Black Power message, while rejecting its philosophies of separation and black superiority—an idea around which a larger Christian theological movement had been forming, as evidenced by a full-page New York Times ad entitled "Black Power" run in November 1967 by the National Committee of Negro Churchmen, and Black Theology and Black Power published in 1969 by James H. Cone.

===== Youth choir =====
The first change occurred in late 1972 when Trinity's youth lobbied for a greater role in the church. Under a new choir director the youth brought in, they led musical worship using gospel music (also see Urban contemporary gospel) for the first time, while incorporating dramatic visual props. As Speller describes it, the youth choir "ushered in a new day at Trinity Church, and through their music they ignited the flame that would burn off the dross of Black shame to reveal the refined gem of self-love." However, with call and response increasing and the Pilgrim Hymnal no longer in favor, some of Trinity's congregants left because of what Wright described as "fear of change—change in the style of worship but, more importantly, change in the kind of members that would desire to join our church."

===== From social enhancement to God-consciousness =====
As Wright philosophized of this period some thirty years later, 'Having a witness among the poor and having a ministry to the poor is one thing, but making the poor folks members of your congregation is something else altogether." Wright further explained, "Failure to have the black poor at the table with you as equals means you are doing missionary work," (sic) while having "poor black folks" (sic) who "sit down at the table as equals" means you are "serious about talking or doing [...] Black theology." As Speller explains, Trinity's congregants "began to slowly move away from the concept of church as a place to enhance and validate their social position to one that appreciated the church as a place for spiritual formation." In sum, Trinity began to more fully move away from its earlier purpose surrounding "middle-classness" to one where devotion to God and the poor took much greater prominence.

God has smiled on us and freed us up to be God's people—unshackled by stereotypes and the barriers of assimilation, unshackled by the fear of joining in the struggle for liberation, and unshackled by the stigmas, defeats, or victories of the past. [God] has freed us to be the Church in the world—[God's] Children! Black, Christian and proud of being created in [God's] image and being called by [God's] name.

Speller asserts that the statement indicates that Trinity had journeyed "from assimilation and fear to liberation and courage", and argues how the freedom expressed concerns a freedom to be black as a matter of cultural identity (also see Ethnic identity), and to be Christian as a matter of purpose and belonging to God. (sic)

From 1972 to early 2008, the Rev. Jeremiah Wright was pastor of Trinity UCC. In February 2008, Wright retired, and the Rev. Otis Moss III became Trinity's pastor.

Among the importantant contemporary media features highlighting Wright and Trinity is that by correspondent Roger Wilkins in a Sherry Jones' documentary entitled "Keeping the Faith," broadcast as the June 16, 1987 episode of the PBS series Frontline with Judy Woodruff.

=== Since 2008: under Reverend Otis Moss III ===
Reverend Dr. Otis Moss III has been Trinity's senior pastor since 2008. He is a graduate of Morehouse College, Yale Divinity School, and Chicago Theological Seminary. His father, Rev. Dr. Otis Moss Jr., was also an acclaimed preacher before him.

Moss' sermons are video streamed live online through the church's website and some sermons can also be found on YouTube.

Weekly broadcasts of the church's Sunday service are also carried across the US on TV One on Sundays at 7:30 a.m. EST.

== Trinity in comparative perspective ==
Byassee argues that "African Americans have generated distinctly black forms of Christianity since they arrived on these [American] shores" and asserts that "the significance of these forms has been appreciated in mainline seminaries and churches for at least two generations." Speller has discussed the major interpretive frameworks into which black churches have been historically categorized by scholars, as well as several later ones. She does this to place Trinity within a broader understanding of the Black church, and all Christian churches, and to trace Trinity's history of movement within several of the frameworks, while also discussing numerous of Trinity's ongoing struggles. Byassee asserts that Trinity is well within the mainstream of the black church, and is remarkable in the mainline Protestant world only for its size and influence."

Speller summarizes several interpretive models of black churches that have predominated in scholarly literature from especially prior the 1960s:

=== The Assimilation Model ===
Black churches that have been explained as within The Assimilation Model are those primarily composed of middle-class blacks motivated by a racially integrated society and who are willing to disassociate themselves from their ethnic identity to achieve this, as well as to avoid the stereotyped labels sometimes assigned to blacks by whites. This model has been described as the "demise of the Black church for the public good of Blacks."

=== The Isolation Model ===
The Isolation Model category has been assigned to those black churches composed of primarily lower-class blacks who lack the optimism of middle-class blacks about societal integration between the races. Churches described as within this model hold to theologies that emphasize "other worldliness" and deemphasize social action within "this world."

=== The Compensatory Model ===
The Compensatory Model has been a designation of black churches where congregants find acceptance, appreciation, and applause often denied them within dominant society. Motivation stems from a promise of achieving personal empowerment and recognition, i.e., congregants are "compensated" with improved self-esteem as their peers affirm their successes.

=== The Ethnic Community-prophetic Model ===
Speller, following the research of Nelson and Nelson in the 1970s, notes how each of the above three models placed black churches within a reactive rather than a proactive mode. Finding that problematic, and unsatisfied that previous interpretive models accurately depicted black churches that emerged in the 1960s, Nelson and Nelson developed a fourth model, The Ethnic Community-prophetic Model. Black churches that have been categorized as such are those that have been marked by blacks who spoke out and undertook activism against economic and political injustices from a heightened awareness of black pride and power.

=== The Dialectical Model ===
In her discussion about Trinity, Speller argues for an additional model of the black church, The Dialectical Model, developed by Duke University sociologist C. Eric Lincoln to explain certain black churches. Corrective to the earlier models by which black churches were susceptible to being rigidly stereotyped, and that barred them from being seen as societal change agents, Lincoln and Mamiya describe the model as holding in "dialectical tension" "the priestly and the prophetic; other-worldly versus this-worldly; universalism and particularism; communalism and privatism; the charismatic versus the bureaucratic and resistance versus accommodation." Speller additionally argues that The Dialectical Model is mirrored in W. E. B. Du Bois's concept of "double consciousness". Du Bois explained this dichotomy:

The history of the American Negro is the history of this strife—this longing to attain self-conscious manhood, to merge his double self into a better and truer self. In this merging he wishes neither of the older selves to be lost. He does not wish to Africanize America, for America has too much to teach the world and Africa; he does not wish to bleach his Negro blood in a flood of white Americanism, for he believes that Negro blood has yet a message for the world. He simply wishes to make it possible for a man to be both a Negro and an American without being cursed and spit upon by his fellows, without losing the opportunity of self-development.

=== The evolution of Trinity ===
Speller asserts that Trinity in its history has evolved from the Assimilation Model under Smith and Jamerson, to the Compensatory Model under Sheares and during the early years of Wright, and into the Ethnic Community-prophetic Model under Wright to embrace the Dialectical Model also under Wright. She states, however, that the church continues to struggle in varying degrees to balance the dialectic polarities described by Lincoln and Mamiya (see The Dialectical Model, just above), and that the church's greatest challenge has been "mediating the tension between being black and Christian." (sic)

== See also ==
- Jeremiah Wright controversy
- Otis Moss III
