= A More Perfect Union (speech) =

2008 speech by Barack Obama

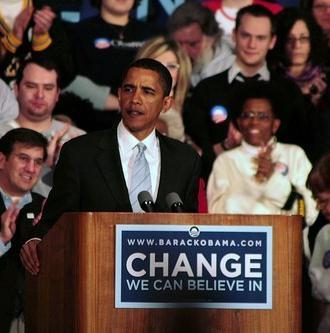
Barack Obama speaking in March 2008

"A More Perfect Union" is the title of a speech delivered by then-Senator Barack Obama on March 18, 2008, in the course of the contest for the 2008 Democratic Party presidential nomination. Speaking before an audience at the National Constitution Center in Philadelphia, Pennsylvania, Obama was responding to a spike in the attention paid to controversial remarks made by Jeremiah Wright, his former pastor and, until shortly before the speech, a participant in his campaign. Obama framed his response in terms of the broader issue of race in the United States. The speech's title was taken from the Preamble to the United States Constitution.

Obama addressed the subjects of racial tensions, white privilege, and racial inequality in the United States, discussing black "anger," white "resentment," and other issues as he sought to explain and contextualize Wright's controversial comments. His speech closed with a plea to move beyond America's "racial stalemate" and address shared social problems.

On March 27, 2008, the Pew Research Center called the speech "arguably the biggest political event of the campaign so far," noting that 85 percent of Americans said they had heard at least a little about the speech and that 54 percent said they heard a lot about it. The New Yorker opined that the speech helped elect Obama as the president of the United States.

== Events prior to the speech ==
Then-Senator Barack Obama, the son of a white American mother and black Kenyan father, launched a campaign in January 2007 to be the Democratic Party's 2008 presidential nominee. His election marked the first election of an African-American president in American history.

In March 2008, ABC News released a story examining the sermons of Obama's longtime pastor, Jeremiah Wright, in which Wright denounced the United States and accused the government of crimes against people of color. Wright had said, among other things, "God damn America" for its racism and "for killing innocent people." Obama had begun distancing himself from Wright when he called his pastor the night before the February 2007 announcement of Obama's presidential candidacy to withdraw his request that Wright deliver an invocation at the event. However, Wright did attend the announcement, prayed with Obama beforehand, and was named to the Obama campaign's African American Religious Leadership Committee. When several videos of Wright's Christmas sermon appeared on YouTube in the first week of March 2008, Obama responded by going further than he had before, "vehemently disagree[ing with] and strongly condemn[ing] ... inflammatory and appalling remarks Wright made about our country, our politics, and my political opponents." On March 14, the campaign announced that "Rev. Wright is no longer serving on the African American Religious Leadership Committee."

Feeling that he had failed to sufficiently address and explain the context of his relationship with the pastor, Obama began writing the speech that became "A More Perfect Union". Obama's usual speechwriting practice during the 2008 campaign was to discuss major themes with speechwriter Jon Favreau, let Favreau write a draft, and then edit the result. However, on Saturday, March 15, Obama dictated a lengthy draft of this speech to Favreau, who edited the speech the next day. Obama stayed up until 3:00 am Sunday night working on the speech, and continued to work on it Monday and in the early hours of Tuesday. He sent his final draft of the speech to Favreau and campaign strategist David Axelrod. After reading Obama's final draft, Axelrod sent him an email saying "This is why you should be president."

Obama later said that as he wrote the speech, he tried to ensure that his mother, Ann Dunham, would have trusted its sentiments.

== Speech ==
Obama's speech began by quoting the preamble to the United States Constitution: "We the people, in order to form a more perfect union ...". Noting his proximity to Independence Hall in Philadelphia, Obama highlighted the tension between the ideals of equal citizenship and freedom expressed in the Constitution and America's history of slavery, and connected the American Civil War and civil rights movement with the goals of his own campaign, "to continue the long march of those who came before us, a march for a more just, more equal, more free, more caring and more prosperous America."

Obama described his own family history—stating that "in no other country on Earth is my story even possible"—and connected both his multicultural background and his campaign with the American motto, "out of many, we are one". He mentioned that he achieved primary victories in "states with some of the whitest populations in the country" and in South Carolina, where he won with the support of white and black voters.

Obama then addressed the comments of Jeremiah Wright:

... we've heard my former pastor ... use incendiary language to express views that have the potential not only to widen the racial divide, but views that denigrate both the greatness and the goodness of our nation; that rightly offend white and black alike.

I have already condemned, in unequivocal terms, the statements of Reverend Wright that have caused such controversy. For some, nagging questions remain. Did I know him to be an occasionally fierce critic of American domestic and foreign policy? Of course. Did I ever hear him make remarks that could be considered controversial while I sat in church? Yes. Did I strongly disagree with many of his political views? Absolutely—just as I'm sure many of you have heard remarks from your pastors, priests, or rabbis with which you strongly disagreed.

But the remarks that have caused this recent firestorm weren't simply controversial. They weren't simply a religious leader's effort to speak out against perceived injustice. Instead, they expressed a profoundly distorted view of this country—a view that sees white racism as endemic, and that elevates what is wrong with America above all that we know is right with America ...

Obama went on to say that Wright's views were "not only wrong but divisive ... at a time when we need unity." He posed the rhetorical question of why he would have allied himself with Wright in the first place. Arguing that Wright and Trinity United Church of Christ had been misrepresented by "the snippets of those sermons that have run in an endless loop on the television and YouTube", Obama spoke of Wright's service to the poor and needy, and of the role Wright played in Obama's own journey to Christianity.

Obama stated that, like other black churches, Trinity contained the full spectrum of the black community: "the kindness and cruelty, the fierce intelligence and the shocking ignorance, the struggles and successes, the love and yes, the bitterness and bias that make up the black experience in America." Similarly, he argued that Wright "contains within him the contradictions—the good and the bad—of the community that he has served diligently for so many years." Therefore, Obama stated:

I can no more disown him than I can disown the black community. I can no more disown him than I can my white grandmother—a woman who helped raise me, a woman who sacrificed again and again for me, a woman who loves me as much as she loves anything in this world, but a woman who once confessed her fear of black men who passed by her on the street, and who on more than one occasion has uttered racial or ethnic stereotypes that made me cringe. These people are a part of me. And they are a part of America, this country that I love.

Emphasizing that he was in no way justifying or excusing Wright's comments, Obama said that to dismiss Wright as a "crank or a demagogue ... would be making the same mistake that Reverend Wright made in his offending sermons about America—to simplify and stereotype and amplify the negative to the point that it distorts reality."

Obama then invoked the history of racial inequality in the United States, first by paraphrasing a line by William Faulkner: "The past isn't dead and buried. In fact, it isn't even past." He argued that many of the difficulties in African-American communities could be traced to the sufferings of previous generations under slavery and Jim Crow laws. Obama observed that, in the era in which African-Americans of Wright's generation grew up, segregation and degradation were common. Even blacks of that generation who, like Wright, surmounted obstacles to succeed in life often remained bitter and angry about their experiences with racism. Obama noted:

That anger may not get expressed in public, in front of white co-workers or white friends. But it does find voice in the barbershop or around the kitchen table ... occasionally it finds voice in the church on Sunday morning, in the pulpit and in the pews. The fact that so many people are surprised to hear that anger in some of Reverend Wright's sermons simply reminds us of the old truism that the most segregated hour in American life occurs on Sunday morning. That anger is not always productive ... it keeps us from squarely facing our own complicity in our condition, and prevents the African-American community from forging the alliances it needs to bring about real change. But the anger is real; it is powerful; and to simply wish it away, to condemn it without understanding its roots, only serves to widen the chasm of misunderstanding that exists between the races.

Obama then shifted to an expression of what he called "a similar anger" in the white community based on resentments over busing, affirmative action, and the way in which fears about crime are often met with accusations of racism. Obama stated that these resentments were rooted in legitimate concerns, and that dismissing them as misguided or racist only widened the racial divide and increased misunderstanding.

Obama described the resultant situation as "a racial stalemate we've been stuck in for years." He pointed out that his "imperfect" candidacy is not the solution to racial division, but argued that it is possible and important for Americans of all races to work together to overcome it. To that end, he called for the African-American community to "[bind] our particular grievances—for better health care, and better schools, and better jobs—to the larger aspirations of all Americans" and for the white community to acknowledge the "legacy of discrimination ... and current incidents of discrimination." Obama insisted that progress on matters of race was both possible and actual:

The profound mistake of Reverend Wright's sermons is not that he spoke about racism in our society. It's that he spoke as if our society was static; as if no progress has been made; as if this country—a country that has made it possible for one of his own members to run for the highest office in the land and build a coalition of white and black; Latino and Asian, rich and poor, young and old—is still irrevocably bound to a tragic past.

Obama then presented a choice to his audience. On the one hand, the country could continue to address race "only as spectacle—as we did in the OJ trial—or in the wake of tragedy, as we did in the aftermath of Katrina—or as fodder for the nightly news." On the other hand, Americans could come together to solve the nation's problems, in particular the problems of education, health care, jobs moving overseas, the Iraq War, and caring for veterans.

Obama concluded his speech by relating an anecdote about a young white woman who organized for his campaign in South Carolina and the personal connection she made with an elderly black volunteer.

By itself, that single moment of recognition between that young white girl and that old black man is not enough. It is not enough to give health care to the sick, or jobs to the jobless, or education to our children. But it is where we start. It is where our union grows stronger. And as so many generations have come to realize over the course of the two-hundred and twenty one years since a band of patriots signed that document in Philadelphia, that is where the perfection begins.

The 37-minute speech as actually delivered was essentially the same as the prepared text of the speech that had been distributed to the media, except for some minor differences.

== Response ==
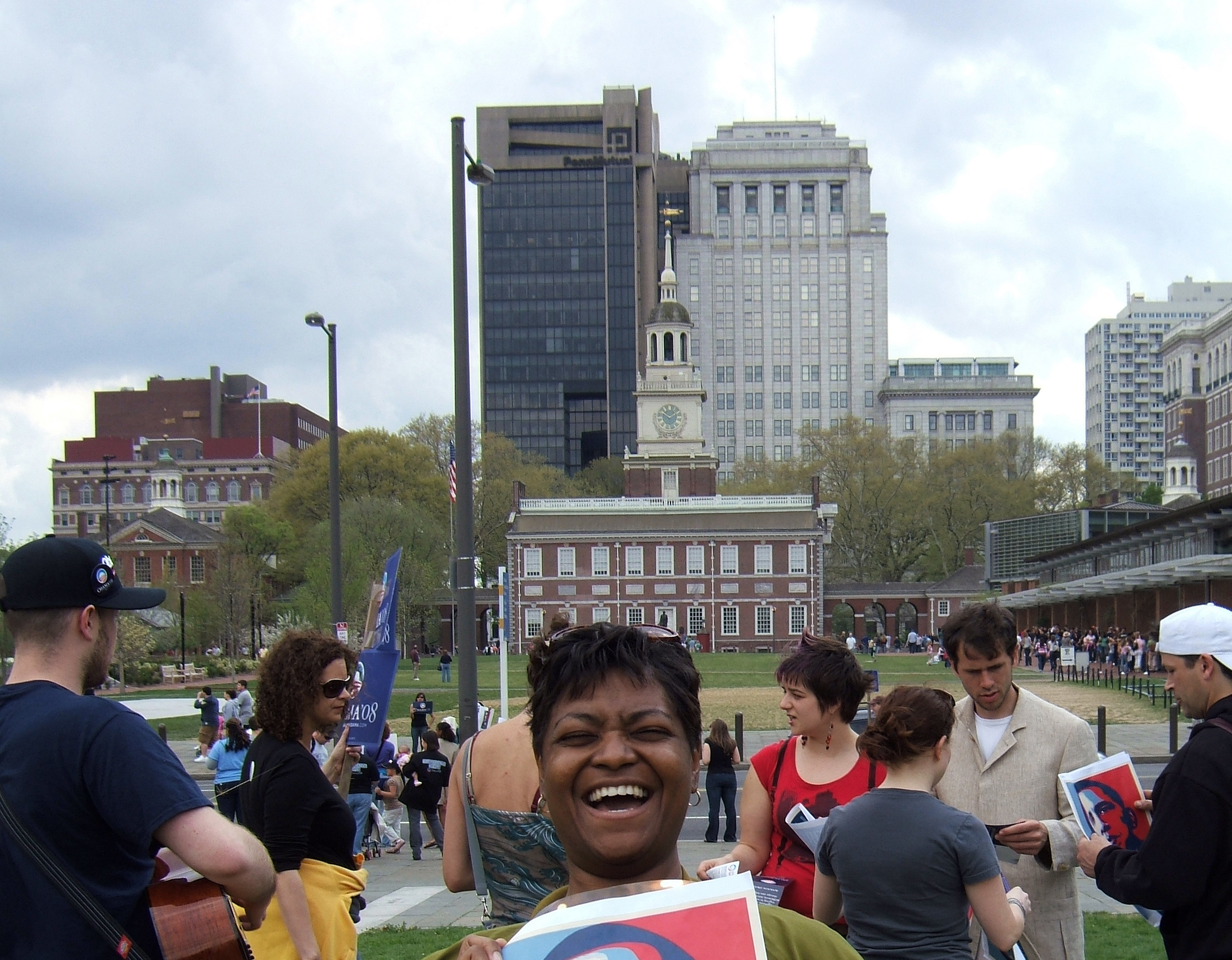
Obama supporters gathered in Independence National Historical Park in Philadelphia prior to Obama's speech

Reaction to Obama's speech was swift and widespread in the United States. Politicians, news media, members of the political punditry, academics, and other groups and individuals quickly weighed in on its significance and effectiveness. In the days following the speech, commentators debated (among other questions) its possible importance to American history, the extent to which Obama did or did not succeed in pushing questions about his association with Jeremiah Wright to the side, and the overall effect the speech would have on Obama's campaign and the contest with Hillary Clinton for the Democratic nomination.

The speech achieved immediate popularity on YouTube, garnering 1.2 million views in the first 24 hours after the speech and 2.5 million views within the first few days.

=== Politicians ===
==== Democrats ====
The response to the speech from Democratic politicians and activists was largely positive. Some characterized the speech as "honest", while others speculated about its possible significance for race relations in the United States.

Obama's only remaining opponent in the race for the Democratic nomination, Senator Hillary Clinton, as well as past Democratic presidential candidates, offered thoughts on the speech soon after it was given. Clinton said that she had not seen or read the speech, but that she was glad he had given it:

Issues of race and gender in America have been complicated throughout our history, and they are complicated in this primary campaign ... There have been detours and pitfalls along the way, but we should remember that this is a historic moment for the Democratic Party and for our country. We will be nominating the first African-American or woman for the presidency of the United States, and that is something that all Americans can and should celebrate.

When asked a week later about the controversy about Obama's pastor that prompted, and was addressed by, Obama's speech, Clinton answered, "He would not have been my pastor. You don't choose your family, but you choose what church you want to attend ... hate speech [is] unacceptable in any setting ... I just think you have to speak out against that. You certainly have to do that, if not explicitly, then implicitly by getting up and moving."

Senator, former 2008 candidate and future President Joe Biden called Obama's speech powerful, truthful, and "one of most important speeches we've heard in a long time." Biden believed that Obama's speech would "come to represent an important step forward in race relations in our country."

The speech played at least a partial role in the decision of New Mexico governor Bill Richardson (who was, like Biden, a former 2008 candidate, and one whose support was heavily courted by both Clinton and Obama given that he was the country's only Latino governor) to endorse Obama for president, on March 21 in Portland, Oregon. According to The New York Times, Richardson had decided to endorse Obama a week earlier (prior to the speech), but "his decision was bolstered by Mr. Obama's speech on race in Philadelphia." After the speech, Richardson sent word to Obama that he had found it inspiring and impressive. While endorsing Obama in Portland, Richardson said that "Senator Barack Obama addressed the issue of race with the eloquence and sincerity and decency and optimism we have come to expect of him ... He did not seek to evade tough issues or to soothe us with comforting half-truths. Rather, he inspired us by reminding us of the awesome potential residing in our own responsibility." The day after the endorsement, Richardson elaborated on his rationale for supporting Obama, saying that the speech "kind of clinched it for me."

In a joint press conference, New York Governor David Paterson and New York City Mayor Michael Bloomberg both praised Obama's speech and remarked that it was an issue he needed to address. Former mayor of New York Ed Koch, a supporter of Hillary Clinton, was one of the few Democrats who were critical of the speech. He called it "unconvincing", chastised Obama for comparing insensitive racial comments made by his white grandmother with the comments made by Wright, and asked "Why didn't Senator Obama stand up in the church and denounce [Wright's] hateful statements or, at the very least, argue privately with his minister?"

Jesse Jackson—who, prior to Obama's campaign, had come closer than any other African American to winning a major party's presidential nomination—said that the Obama campaign had been on the verge of being derailed by racial fear stemming from Wright's comments and previous remarks by Clinton supporter Geraldine Ferraro that Obama would not have come so far had he been white. Jackson said that Obama "made the case we've been here before, but not this time will we linger. This time we're going to higher ground."

Democratic consultants and strategists also evaluated the importance and effectiveness of the speech. Stephanie Cutter, John Kerry's spokesperson in the 2004 presidential campaign, suggested that "no other person in this country, black or white, could have given a speech like that." She called the speech "incredibly honest and personal" and argued that Obama "changed the terms of the debate." Donna Brazile, former manager of Al Gore's 2000 presidential campaign, said that Obama was one of the few politicians who "could weave not just their own personal history with American history but [serve] themselves up as an example of the contradictions in this country." According to Brazile, Obama had reclaimed the "high road", but the question remained as to whether that road would "lead to the White House or back to the United States Senate." Unaffiliated Democratic strategist Jamal Simmons called it "an incredibly honest speech" and "a brave thing to do politically." Simmons stated it "was the most profound speech about race that I could recall in my lifetime."

==== Republicans ====
Prominent Republican politicians reacted to the speech as well. Former Arkansas governor and 2008 presidential candidate Mike Huckabee praised Obama's speech on the MSNBC program Morning Joe, while also commenting on the Wright controversy. Huckabee argued that Obama "handled this about as well as anybody could" and suggested that it was "a very historic speech." While he decried the remarks made by Wright, Huckabee, a former pastor himself, also noted that "sermons ... are rarely written word-for-word" and that pastors often get "caught up in the emotion of the moment." Referencing his experience growing up in the segregated South and the legacy of Jim Crow, the former Arkansas governor noted that "we've got to cut some slack to people who grew up being called names, being told, 'You have to sit in the balcony when you go to [a] movie' ... Sometimes people do have a chip on their shoulder and resentment. And you have to just say, I probably would too." Huckabee suggested that he was "probably the only conservative in America who's going to say something like this."

Presumptive Republican presidential nominee John McCain also offered a warm reaction to the speech during an interview with Chris Matthews on April 15 at Villanova University, describing it as an "excellent speech" and "an important statement that he had to make at the time", and saying that "it was good for all of America to have heard it."

Condoleezza Rice, the top ranking African American in the Bush cabinet, responded to the speech on March 28, saying, "I think it was important that he (Obama) gave it for a whole host of reasons." Rice went on to say that "[t]here is a paradox for this country and a contradiction of this country and we still haven't resolved it ... but what I would like understood as a black American is that black Americans loved and had faith in this country even when this country didn't love and have faith in them, and that's our legacy." Colin Powell, Rice's predecessor as Secretary of State, described Obama's speech as "a very, very thoughtful, direct speech", and added: "I admired him for giving it, and I agreed with much of what he said."

The political strategist and former executive director of the Christian Coalition of America Ralph Reed argued that Obama should have gone much further in his condemnation of Wright. He saw the speech as "an enormous missed opportunity to really assert as a very articulate and capable African-American leader how damaging Wright's expressions of hatred and animosity are to the African-American community itself."

In a speech before the American Enterprise Institute, former Republican Speaker of the House Newt Gingrich responded directly to Obama, who he said "gave us a very courageous speech." Gingrich agreed that "there's an authenticity and legitimacy of anger by many groups in America", and "that anger can be a source of energy to create a better future, in which case it's a good thing. But if anger is a self-inflicted wound that limits us, it is a very bad and a very dangerous thing. And we have to be very careful about the role that anger plays in our culture." Gingrich encouraged Obama to "join a dialogue about new solutions" to problems of race and poverty, including "solutions based on principles that have been politically incorrect in terms of the culture of the Left."

=== News media and pundits ===
An editorial in The New York Times praised the remarks, saying, "Senator Barack Obama, who has not faced such tests of character this year, faced one on Tuesday. It is hard to imagine how he could have handled it better."

Chris Matthews of MSNBC referred to the speech as "what many of us think is one of the great speeches in American history, and we watch a lot of them." Independent Women's Forum CEO and MSNBC political analyst Michelle Bernard said it was "the best speech and most important speech on race that we have heard as a nation since Martin Luther King's 'I Have a Dream' speech."

Jonathan Alter of Newsweek said that "Barack Obama didn't simply touch the touchiest subject in America, he grabbed it and turned it over and examined it from several different angles and made it personal. Just steps from Independence Hall in Philadelphia, he rang the bell hard and well."

Writing in The Wall Street Journal, Peggy Noonan called the speech "strong, thoughtful and important", and noted that its rhetorical style subverted the soundbite-driven coverage of contemporary news media.

Jim VandeHei and John F. Harris of Politico said that "[t]he Philadelphia speech offered lines calculated to reassure all the groups with which he is most vulnerable." However, they noted that "Obama's cross-racial and even cross-partisan support has been driven by a belief that he is a new-era politician, not defined by the grievances and ideological habits of an earlier generation ... Then came Wright." The authors quote Southern academic Merle Black as saying: "The new information, especially about his minister and his twenty-year association with this church, really undermines the message he's been delivering for the last year, it completely undercuts it."

Charles Murray, author of The Bell Curve, wrote at National Review Online (NRO) that "As far as I'm concerned, it is just plain flat out brilliant—rhetorically, but also in capturing a lot of nuance about race in America. It is so far above the standard we're used to from our pols." Also at NRO, Peter Wehner, former deputy assistant to the president and a senior fellow at the Ethics and Public Policy Center, wrote:

Senator Obama's speech on Tuesday was a brilliant effort to deflect attention away from what remains the core issue: what did Obama hear, when did he hear it, and what did he do about it? The answers, as best we can tell at this stage, is that Obama heard some very harsh things said from the pulpit of Trinity United Church of Christ; that Obama heard them said a long time ago and probably repeatedly; and that he did little or nothing about it. This from a man who tells us at almost every stop along the campaign trail that he has the "judgment to lead."

Ben Smith at Politico compared the speech to Mitt Romney's earlier campaign address regarding his religion: "A smart colleague notes that this speech is the polar opposite of this year's other big speech on faith, in which Mitt Romney went to Texas to talk about Mormonism, but made just one reference to his Mormon faith. Obama mentions Wright by name 14 times."

Dean Barnett of the conservative journal The Weekly Standard wrote a piece subtitled "Answering the question no one asked", saying:

Jeremiah Wright is a man who less than a week after 9/11 gave a sermon that sadistically rejoiced how America's chickens had come home to roost ... The fact is, Barack Obama opted to remain in this minister's company for more than six years after that sermon until partially distancing himself just last week in the heat of a presidential race ... What the analysts who are gushing over Obama's sentiments regarding race relations are missing is not only did Obama fail to accomplish the mission he needed to, he didn't even really try. He made no attempt to explain his relationship with Wright and why he hung around a man who habitually offered such hateful rhetoric. Obama instead offered a non-sequitur on race relations.

Writing for progressive journal The Nation, Tom Hayden, Bill Fletcher Jr., Danny Glover, and Barbara Ehrenreich said that

Obama's speech on racism was as great a speech as ever given by a presidential candidate, revealing a philosophical depth, personal authenticity, and political intelligence that should convince any but the hardest of ideologues that he carries unmatched leadership potentials for overcoming the divide-and-conquer tactics that have sundered Americans since the first slaves arrived here in chains.

In a moment of rare straight-faced sincerity, Jon Stewart of The Daily Show finished his otherwise-typical satirical coverage of the speech by calmly stating: "And so, at 11 o'clock AM on a Tuesday, a prominent politician spoke to Americans about race as though they were adults."

Conservative The New York Times columnist Bill Kristol rejected Obama's call for a discussion of race in America, saying: "The last thing we need now is a heated national conversation about race. ... 'National conversations' tend to be pointless and result-less." In contrast, liberal columnist Frank Rich said that he shared "the general view that Mr. Obama's speech is the most remarkable utterance on the subject by a public figure in modern memory."

CBSNews.com senior political editor Vaughn Ververs commented: "... a speech long on history was shorter on solutions. It will take some time for this speech to settle in to the nation's political consciousness but it's unlikely to stop a potentially divisive conversation that has already begun."

Syndicated columnist Charles Krauthammer dismissed Obama's speech as "a brilliant fraud" that failed to either properly pose or frankly answer the question of why someone who purports to transcend the anger of the past would remain in a congregation whose pastor epitomizes that anger; he referred to the speech as an "elegantly crafted, brilliantly sophistic justification of that scandalous dereliction." After Wright made a series of appearances in March 2008 and Obama changed his initial decision to not renounce Wright, Krauthammer derided "the speech [that] was not just believed [but] was hailed, celebrated, canonized as the greatest pronouncement on race in America since Lincoln at Cooper Union" as a "shameful, brilliantly executed, 5,000-word intellectual fraud." He argued that it was based on moral "equivalences [that have] been revealed as the cheap rhetorical tricks they always were", a "pretense that this 'endless loop' of sermon excerpts being shown on 'television sets and YouTube' had been taken out of context" that had now been destroyed, and an assertion that white surprise at Wright's anger was based on ignorance, rendered inoperative by Obama's own new admission of surprise.

Summarizing the media response to the speech, The Washington Post media critic Howard Kurtz wrote,

Not surprisingly, most liberals loved the speech and many conservatives—though not all—lambasted it. ... the reaction on the left and right sometimes made me wonder whether these pundits were watching the same speech. The only point of agreement I found is skepticism that it will help Obama with white, working-class voters, sometimes short-handed as Reagan Democrats.

After Obama had secured the Democratic nomination, journalists continued to refer to this speech when analyzing the role of race and racial attitudes in the presidential contest. A Newsweek summary of Obama's campaign called the speech a "tour de force, the sort of speech that only Barack Obama could give", but added that "a close reading of the speech suggests more than a hint of personal grandiosity."

=== Academics ===
Political scientists and other academics also offered initial evaluations of the speech. While generally agreeing that the speech was quite significant, there was debate about what effect it would have on the campaign.

Larry Sabato of the University of Virginia said that it "was a serious speech about the incendiary topic of race in America." Sabato noted that a debate about race was "inevitable" in the campaign and that "from Obama's perspective, it's much better to have this discussion now", rather than shortly before the November election (assuming he captured the Democratic nomination).

Congressional scholar and Brookings Institution senior fellow Thomas Mann argued that Obama gave "an extraordinary speech—not because of any rhetorical flourishes, but because it was honest, frank, measured in tone, inclusive and hopeful." Obama "appeared wise beyond his years and genuinely presidential", but Mann felt it was unclear "whether it will be sufficient to stem a racial backlash against his candidacy."

Donald F. Kettl of the University of Pennsylvania called the speech "stirring" and noted that, "rather than put race behind him, [Obama] put it more at the center of the campaign." However, Kettl questioned "whether the message will resonate with white working class Pennsylvanians" (Pennsylvania being the next state to vote in the Democratic primaries) and argued that Obama needed to "couple his portrait of race to the broader challenge of economic opportunity" in order to connect with white voters.

Some political science professors questioned whether Obama's speech would have the effect he hoped for in terms of distancing himself from the controversial comments made by Wright and allaying the concerns of a number of white voters. The political scientist and former North Carolina Libertarian gubernatorial candidate Michael Munger called the speech "brave", but said that Obama was "being naive". Munger argued that "[a] black candidate named Barack Hussein Obama can't have questions about his patriotism, and commitment to America, not if he is going to beat a genuine war hero" (a reference to John McCain and the general election). He argued that Obama "had to distance himself far from Wright. Instead, he was brave." Susan B. Hansen of the University of Pittsburgh noted that "the dilemma for Obama is that the more he talks about race being unimportant or transcended, the more important it will become to the media and voters' perceptions." She suggested Obama did not put the Wright issue to rest and that, if Obama became the nominee, Wright's comments would no doubt play a role in the general election as fodder for Republican attacks against him. Similarly, Eric Plutzer of Penn State argued that Obama's speech "did not put the Rev. Wright controversy behind him. Those skeptical of Obama are likely to continue to distribute video clips, and quotes of Obama's own words, to argue that his reaction was not sufficiently strong ..."

Historian Roger Wilkins suggested that no other presidential candidate had ever engaged in such an extensive discussion of race.

David Eisenhower at the University of Pennsylvania compared the speech with Robert Kennedy's 1968 speech on the assassination of Martin Luther King, saying: "Like Robert Kennedy, Obama used this as a teaching moment."

Historian Garry Wills, author of Lincoln at Gettysburg (1992), a Pulitzer Prize-winning book on Abraham Lincoln's Gettysburg Address, compared "A More Perfect Union" with Lincoln's Cooper Union speech of 1860. He noted similarities in the political contexts of both speeches: "The men, both lawyers, both from Illinois, were seeking the presidency, despite what seemed their crippling connection with extremists. ... Each decided to address [alleged connections with radicals] openly in a prominent national venue, well before their parties' nominating conventions". Wills argued that "Jeremiah Wright was Obama's John Brown" (Brown was the radical abolitionist from whom Lincoln made a point of disassociating himself). For Wills, "what is of lasting interest is their similar strategy for meeting the charge of extremism ... Each looked for larger patterns under the surface bitternesses of their day. Each forged a moral position that rose above the occasions for their speaking." While Wills was complimentary of Obama's speech, he noted that its prose "of necessity lagged far behind the resplendent Lincoln."

Houston A. Baker Jr., a professor at Vanderbilt University, scholar of African-American literature, and former president of the Modern Language Association, criticized the speech, saying:

Sen. Obama's "race speech" at the National Constitution Center, draped in American flags, was reminiscent of the Parthenon concluding scene of Robert Altman's Nashville: a bizarre moment of mimicry, aping Martin Luther King Jr., while even further distancing himself from the real, economic, religious and political issues so courageously articulated by King from a Birmingham jail. In brief, Obama's speech was a pandering disaster that threw, once again, his pastor under the bus.

T. Denean Sharpley-Whiting, director of Vanderbilt University's program in African American and diaspora studies, edited The Speech: Race and Barack Obama's "A More Perfect Union", a 2009 collection of essays about the speech, with contributions from novelists Alice Randall and Adam Mansbach, theologian Obery M. Hendricks Jr., newspaper columnist Connie Schultz, and language scholar Geneva Smitherman.

=== Other responses ===
The New York Times reported that, within days of the speech, some religious groups and institutions of higher learning were "especially enthusiastic" about Obama's call for a racial dialogue. According to the Times, "Universities were moving to incorporate the issues Mr. Obama raised into classroom discussions and course work, and churches were trying to find ways to do the same in sermons and Bible studies." Troy Benton, lead pastor at a church outside Atlanta, said that he did not "see how you can be an African-American preacher and not try to figure out how to have something to say this Sunday (March 23, 2008), even though it's Easter." James A. Forbes was to preach the Trinity United Church of Christ Easter service which Wright had preached in the past, telling the Times: "It is nighttime in America, and I want to bring a word of encouragement."

Janet Murguia, president of the National Council of La Raza, said that she hoped that Obama's speech would help people "talk more openly and honestly about the tensions, both overt and as an undercurrent, that exist around race and racial politics."

Others applauded Obama's call for a national dialogue on race, but hoped that words would be translated into action. Rabbi Michael Lerner, the editor of Tikkun and a founder of the Network of Spiritual Progressives, argued that "this has got to be more than a speech because these things don't just happen spontaneously ... There needs to be some systematic, organizational commitment to making this happen, with churches, synagogues and mosques working out a plan for continued dialogue."

Later in the 2008 presidential campaign, Obama cited his crafting of this speech as an example of a "gut decision". Speaking to journalist Joe Klein in October 2008, Obama said that he decided to make his response to Wright's comments "big as opposed to make it small", and added:

My gut was telling me that this was a teachable moment and that if I tried to do the usual political damage control instead of talking to the American people like ... they were adults and could understand the complexities of race, I would be not only doing damage to the campaign but missing an important opportunity for leadership.

== Effect on voters ==
One of the crucial questions after Obama's speech was what effect (if any) the speech would have on voters in terms of their overall opinion of Obama and their willingness to vote for him in the remaining Democratic primaries and in the general election. Critical to these questions was the extent to which voters identified Obama with the views of Jeremiah Wright.

A Fox News poll taken immediately after Obama's speech on the evenings of March 18 and March 19 found that 57 percent of respondents did not believe that Obama shared the views of Wright while 24 percent believed he did share Wright's views. 36 percent of Republicans, 20 percent of independents, and 17 percent of Democrats believed that Obama shared Wright's views. The poll also found that 35 percent of voters (including 25 percent of Democrats and 27 percent of independents) had doubts about Obama because of his relationship with Wright. The racial division was especially noteworthy, with 40 percent of whites expressing doubts in comparison to only 2 percent of African Americans.

A CBS News poll taken two nights after the speech showed that 69 percent of registered voters who heard about or read about the speech felt that Obama "did a good job addressing race relations." Seventy-one percent felt that Obama had effectively explained his relationship with the controversial pastor. An equal numbers of voters (14 percent) saw themselves as more likely to vote for Obama after the speech as saw themselves less likely to vote for him. 70 percent of voters felt that recent events had made no difference. These numbers are markedly different from the pre-speech numbers. The numbers were less positive for Obama when respondents were asked whether he would unite the country; only 52 percent said he would, a drop of fifteen percentage points from a poll taken the previous month.

A poll taken by the Pew Research Center between March 19 and March 22 showed that, although 35 percent of likely voters said that their opinion of Obama had grown less favorable because of the Wright affair, it had not had a significant effect on the support for his candidacy; he maintained a 49 percent to 39 percent lead over Hillary Clinton among likely Democratic voters. The survey showed that 51 percent of the public had heard "a lot" about Wright's controversial sermons, and 54 percent heard "a lot" about Obama's speech. Of those who heard "a lot" about the speech, 51 percent felt that he had handled the situation well, as did 66 percent of Democrats (84 percent of Obama supporters and 43 percent of Clinton supporters).

Similarly, in a The Wall Street Journal/NBC poll taken between March 24 and March 25, 63 percent of registered voters said that they had been following the Wright story "very closely" or "somewhat closely". 85 percent said that they were disturbed "a great deal" or "somewhat" by Wright's comments. 46 percent said that they had heard or seen most of Obama's speech, and another 23 percent heard or saw news coverage of the speech. Of those who had seen or heard the speech, 55 percent were satisfied with Obama's explanation of his relationship with Wright, and 44 percent said they were reassured about Obama's thinking and beliefs on the issue of race. (46 percent of white voters who saw the speech said that they were still uncertain or doubtful about Obama's thinking and beliefs on race.) In this poll, Obama and Clinton were tied among Democratic voters with 45 percent each; in a hypothetical general election matchup against John McCain, Obama lead slightly (44 to 42 percent) while Clinton trailed McCain slightly (44 to 46 percent).

In the long run, the speech had a significant effect on some voters, Hendrik Hertzberg writing:

In his Philadelphia speech of March 18, 2008, prompted by the firestorm over his former pastor, he treated the American people as adults capable of complex thinking—as his equals, you might say. But what made that speech special, what enabled it to save his candidacy, was its analytic power. It was not defensive. It did not overcompensate. In its combination of objectivity and empathy, it persuaded Americans of all colors that he understood them. In return, they have voted to make him their President.

== Role in changing media landscape ==
Beyond the content of the speech, some media coverage focused on the manner in which it spread through the Internet. Video of the speech "went viral", reaching over 1.3 million views on YouTube within a day of the speech's delivery. By March 27, the speech had been viewed nearly 3.4 million times. In the days after the speech, links to the video and to transcripts of the speech were the most popular items posted on Facebook. The New York Times observed that the transcript of the speech was e-mailed more frequently than their news story on the speech, and suggested that this might be indicative of a new pattern in how young people receive news, avoiding conventional media filters. Maureen Dowd further referenced the phenomenon on March 30, writing in her column that Obama "can ensorcell when he has to, and he has viral appeal. Who else could alchemize a nuanced 40-minute speech on race into must-see YouTube viewing for 20-year-olds?" By May 30, the speech had been viewed on YouTube over 4.5 million times. The Los Angeles Times cited the prominence of the speech and the music video "Yes We Can" as examples of the Obama campaign's success in spreading its message online, in contrast with the campaign of Republican (then) presumptive nominee John McCain.
