= Obery M. Hendricks Jr. =

American writer

The Reverend Obery M. Hendricks Jr.
- Born: Obery Mack Hendricks Jr. April 9, 1953 (age 73)
- Political party: Democratic Party

Ecclesiastical career
- Religion: Christianity (Methodist)
- Church: African Methodist Episcopal Church
- Ordained: 1995

Academic background
- Education: Rutgers University; Princeton Theological Seminary; Princeton University
- Thesis: A Discourse of Domination (1995)

Academic work
- Discipline: Theology
- School or tradition: Christian socialism
- Institutions: Drew University; Payne Theological Seminary; New York Theological Seminary

Obery Mack Hendricks Jr. (born 1953) is a visiting research scholar at Columbia University. Before taking this position he was a professor at Drew University and a visiting professor at Princeton Theological Seminary. He has also served as president of Payne Theological Seminary, the oldest African-American theological institution. He is an ordained elder in the African Methodist Episcopal Church.

A former Wall Street investment executive, Hendricks received his PhD from Princeton University. He is currently a spokesperson who has been featured on C-SPAN, PBS, NPR, the Bloomberg network, hip hop stations and more. He has been a featured writer as well as an editor or editorial advisor for multiple publications including the award-winning Tikkun magazine. He is a member of the Faith Advisory Council of the Democratic National Committee and an Affiliated Scholar in the "Faith and Public Policy Initiative" at the Center for American Progress.

Hendricks currently lives in New York City.

== Books ==
- Living Water, HarperOne, 2003. ISBN 978-0-06-000087-5
- The Politics of Jesus: Rediscovering the True Revolutionary Nature of Jesus' Teachings and How They Have Been Corrupted, Doubleday, 2006. ISBN 978-0-385-51665-5
- The Universe Bends Toward Justice: Radical Reflections on the Bible, the Church, and the Body Politic, Orbis Books, 2011. ISBN 978-1-57075-940-6
- Christians Against Christianity: How Right-Wing Evangelicals are Destroying Our Nation and Our Faith, Beacon Press, 2021. ISBN 978-0-80705-740-7
