= Jeremiah Wright controversy =

2008 American political controversy

The Jeremiah Wright controversy gained national attention in the United States, in March 2008 after ABC News investigated the sermons of Jeremiah Wright who was, at that time, the pastor of then U.S. presidential candidate Barack Obama. Excerpted parts of the sermons were found to pertain to terrorist attacks on the United States and government dishonesty and were subject to intense media scrutiny. Wright is a retired senior pastor of Trinity United Church of Christ in Chicago and former pastor of Obama.

Obama denounced the statements in question, but critics continued to press the issue of his relationship with Wright. In response to this, he gave a speech titled "A More Perfect Union", in which he sought to place Wright's comments in a historical and sociological context. In the speech, Obama again denounced Wright's remarks, but did not disown him as a person. The controversy began to fade, but was renewed in late April of that year when Wright made a series of media appearances, including an interview on Bill Moyers Journal, a speech at the NAACP, and a speech at the National Press Club. After the last of these, Obama spoke more forcefully against his former pastor, saying that he was "outraged" and "saddened" by his behavior, and in May he resigned his membership in the church.

== Background ==
Barack Obama first met Wright in the late 1980s, while he was working as a community organizer in Chicago before attending Harvard Law School. Wright officiated at the wedding ceremony of Barack and Michelle Obama, as well as at their children's baptisms.

The title of Obama's 2006 memoir, The Audacity of Hope, was inspired by one of Wright's sermons. This sermon also was the source for themes of Obama's 2004 keynote address to the Democratic National Convention.

As reported in The New York Times, Wright was scheduled to give the public invocation before Obama's presidential announcement, but Obama withdrew the invitation the night before the event. Wright criticized the Times for their characterization of the incident as a distortion of the interview he had granted, where he had spoken of Obama in an extremely positive light.

In 2007, Wright was appointed to Barack Obama's African American Religious Leadership Committee, a group of over 170 national black religious leaders who supported Obama's bid for the Democratic nomination. However, it was announced in March 2008 that Wright was no longer serving as a member of this group.

On May 31, 2008, Barack and Michelle Obama announced that they had withdrawn their membership in Trinity United Church of Christ, stating that "Our relations with Trinity have been strained by the divisive statements of Reverend Wright, which sharply conflict with our own views".

== Controversial sermon excerpts ==
Most of the controversial excerpts that gained national attention in March 2008 were taken from two sermons: one titled "The Day of Jerusalem's Fall", delivered on September 16, 2001, and another titled "Confusing God and Government", delivered on April 13, 2003.

=== "The Day of Jerusalem's Fall" ===
In a sermon delivered shortly after the September 11 attacks in 2001, Wright made comments about an interview of former U.S. Ambassador Edward Peck which he saw on Fox News. Wright said:

I heard Ambassador Peck on an interview yesterday. Did anybody else see him or hear him? He was on Fox News. This is a white man, and he was upsetting the Fox News commentators to no end. He pointed out — did you see him, John? — a white man, he pointed out, ambassador, that what Malcolm X said when he got silenced by Elijah Muhammad was in fact true — America's chickens are coming home to roost.

Wright spoke of the United States taking land from the Indian tribes by what he described as "terrorism," invading Grenada and Panama as well as bombing Libya in addition to Hiroshima and Nagasaki, and argued that the United States supported state terrorism against the Palestinians and South Africa. He said that his parishioners' response should be to examine their relationship with God, not go "from the hatred of armed enemies to the hatred of unarmed innocents." His comment (quoting Malcolm X) that "America's chickens are coming home to roost" was widely interpreted as meaning that America had brought the September 11 attacks upon itself. ABC News broadcast clips from the sermon in which Wright said:

We bombed Hiroshima, we bombed Nagasaki, and we nuked far more than the thousands in New York and the Pentagon, and we never batted an eye ... and now we are indignant, because the stuff we have done overseas is now brought back into our own front yards. America's chickens are coming home to roost.

Later, Wright continued:

Violence begets violence. Hatred begets hatred. And terrorism begets terrorism. A white ambassador said that, y'all. Not a black militant. Not a reverend who preaches about racism. An ambassador whose eyes are wide open and who is trying to get us to wake up and move away from this dangerous precipice upon which we are now poised. The ambassador said the people that we have wounded don't have the military capability we have. But they do have individuals who are willing to die and take thousands with them. And we need to come to grips with that.

=== "Confusing God and Government" ===
Clips from a sermon that Wright gave, entitled "Confusing God and Government", were also shown on ABC's Good Morning America and on Fox News. In the sermon, Wright first makes the distinction between God and statecraft, and points out that many governments in the past have failed: "Where governments lie, God does not lie. Where governments change, God does not change." Wright then states:

[The United States] government lied about their belief that all men were created equal. The truth is they believed that all white men were created equal. The truth is they did not even believe that white women were created equal, in creation nor civilization. The government had to pass an amendment to the Constitution to get white women the vote. Then the government had to pass an equal rights amendment to get equal protection under the law for women. The government still thinks a woman has no rights over her own body, and between Uncle Clarence who sexually harassed Anita Hill, and a closeted Klan court, that is a throwback to the 19th century, handpicked by Daddy Bush, Ronald Reagan, Gerald Ford, between Clarence and that stacked court, they are about to undo Roe vs. Wade, just like they are about to un-do affirmative action. The government lied in its founding documents and the government is still lying today. Governments lie.

He continued:

The government lied about Pearl Harbor too. They knew the Japanese were going to attack. Governments lie. The government lied about the Gulf of Tonkin Incident. They wanted that resolution to get us in the Vietnam War. Governments lie. The government lied about Nelson Mandela and our CIA helped put him in prison and keep him there for 27 years. The South African government lied on Nelson Mandela. Governments lie.

Wright then stated:

The government lied about the Tuskegee experiment. They purposely infected African American men with syphilis. Governments lie. The government lied about bombing Cambodia and Richard Nixon stood in front of the camera, "Let me make myself perfectly clear ..." Governments lie. The government lied about the drugs for arms Contra scheme orchestrated by Oliver North, and then the government pardoned all the perpetrators so they could get better jobs in the government. Governments lie. ... The government lied about inventing the HIV virus as a means of genocide against people of color. Governments lie. The government lied about a connection between Al Qaeda and Saddam Hussein and a connection between 9.11.01 and Operation Iraqi Freedom. Governments lie.

He spoke about the government's rationale for the Iraq War:

The government lied about weapons of mass destruction in Iraq being a threat to the United States peace. And guess what else? If they don't find them some weapons of mass destruction, they gonna do just like the LAPD, and plant them some weapons of mass destruction. Governments lie.

Wright then commented on God and government:

And the United States of America government, when it came to treating her citizens of Indian descent fairly, she failed. She put them on reservations. When it came to treating her citizens of Japanese descent fairly, she failed. She put them in internment prison camps. When it came to treating her citizens of African descent fairly, America failed. She put them in chains, the government put them on slave quarters, put them on auction blocks, put them in cotton field, put them in inferior schools, put them in substandard housing, put them in scientific experiments, put them in the lowest paying jobs, put them outside the equal protection of the law, kept them out of their racist bastions of higher education and locked them into positions of hopelessness and helplessness. The government gives them the drugs, builds bigger prisons, passes a three-strike law and then wants us to sing "God Bless America". No, no, no, not God Bless America. God damn America — that's in the Bible — for killing innocent people. God damn America, for treating our citizens as less than human. God damn America, as long as she tries to act like she is God, and she is supreme. The United States government has failed the vast majority of her citizens of African descent.

These sermon excerpts were widely viewed in early 2008 on network television and the Internet.

== Reaction ==
=== Barack Obama ===
When Wright's comments were aired in the national media, Obama distanced himself from them, saying to Charles Gibson of ABC News, "It's as if we took the five dumbest things that I've ever said or you've ever said in our lives and compressed them and put them out there — I think that people's reaction would, understandably, be upset." At the same time, Obama stated that "words that degrade individuals have no place in our public dialogue, whether it's on the campaign stump or in the pulpit. In sum, I reject outright the statements by Rev. Wright that are at issue." Obama later added, "Had the reverend not retired, and had he not acknowledged that what he had said had deeply offended people and were inappropriate and mischaracterized what I believe is the greatness of this country, for all its flaws, then I wouldn't have felt as comfortable staying at the church."

Obama stated that he was aware of Wright's controversial comments and had personally heard "remarks that could be considered controversial" in Wright's church, but denied having heard the particular inflammatory statements that were widely televised during the campaign. Obama was specifically asked by Bill O'Reilly if Wright had said white people were bad, to which Obama replied that he hadn't. In his book Dreams from my Father, Obama had quoted Wright as saying in a sermon "It's this world, where cruise ships throw away more food in a day than most residents of Port-au-Prince see in a year, where White folks' greed runs a world in need." Obama said that the remarks had come to his attention at the beginning of his presidential campaign, but contended that because Wright was on the verge of retirement, and because of Obama's strong links to Trinity, he had not thought it appropriate to leave the church. He began distancing himself from Wright when he called his pastor the night before the February 2007 announcement of Obama's presidential candidacy to withdraw his request that Wright deliver an invocation at the event. A spokesperson later said, "Senator Obama is proud of his pastor and his church, but ... decided to avoid having statements and beliefs being used out of context and forcing the entire church to defend itself." Wright attended the announcement, prayed with Obama beforehand, and in December 2007 Obama named him to the African American Religious Leadership Committee of his campaign. The Obama campaign released Wright after the controversy.

Obama's critics found this response inadequate. For example, Mark Steyn, writing in the conservative publication National Review, stated: "Reverend Wright['s] appeals to racial bitterness are supposed to be everything President Obama will transcend. Right now, it sounds more like the same-old same-old."

On March 18, in the wake of the controversy, Obama delivered a speech entitled "A More Perfect Union" at the National Constitution Center in Philadelphia, Pennsylvania. During the course of the 37-minute speech, Obama spoke of the divisions formed through generations through slavery, segregation, and Jim Crow laws, and the reasons for the kinds of discussions and rhetoric used among blacks and whites in their own communities. While condemning the remarks by the pastor, he sought to place them in historical context by describing some of the key events that have formed Wright's views on race-related matters in America. Obama did not disown Wright, whom he has labeled as "an old uncle", as akin to disowning the black community. The speech was generally well received. Obama said that some of the comments by his pastor reminded him of what he called America's "tragic history when it comes to race."

=== Other presidential candidates ===
In an interview with the editorial board of the Pittsburgh Tribune-Review on March 25, 2008, Hillary Clinton commented on Obama's attendance at Trinity United Church of Christ, stating, "You don't choose your family, but you choose what church you want to attend." Later the same day, during a press conference, Clinton spoke on her personal preference in a pastor: "I think given all we have heard and seen, [Wright] would not have been my pastor." A spokesperson for the Obama campaign asserted that Clinton's comments were part of a "transparent effort to distract attention away from the story she made up about dodging sniper fire in Bosnia" the prior week. Weeks later during the Pennsylvania debate in Philadelphia, Clinton said, "For Pastor Wright to have given his first sermon after 9/11 and to have blamed the United States for the attack, which happened in my city of New York, would have been just intolerable for me."

Future Republican nominee John McCain defended Obama, saying, "I think that when people support you, it doesn't mean that you support everything they say. Obviously, those words and those statements are statements that none of us would associate ourselves with, and I don't believe that Senator Obama would support any of those, as well."

=== Government officials ===
Vice President Dick Cheney weighed in on the Wright matter on April 10, 2008. He appeared on Sean Hannity's radio show and said, "I thought some of the things he said were absolutely appalling ... I haven't gotten into the business of trying to judge how Sen. Obama dealt with it, or didn't deal with it, but I think, like most Americans, I was stunned at what the reverend was preaching in his church and then putting up on his Web site."

Lawrence Korb—Director of National Security Studies at the Council on Foreign Relations, and former assistant Secretary of Defense in the administration of Ronald Reagan—defended Wright's military service, stating, "We've seen on television, in a seemingly endless loop, sound bites of a select few of Rev. Wright's many sermons. Some of the Wright's comments are inexcusable and inappropriate and should be condemned, but in calling him 'unpatriotic,' let us not forget that this is a man who gave up six of the most productive years of his life to serve his country ... he has demonstrated his patriotism."

=== Media ===
==== Commentators and pundits ====
Conservative radio talk show and television host Sean Hannity expressed shock and anger when hearing the comments, saying, "First of all, I will not let up on this issue. If his pastor went to Libya, Tripoli with Louis Farrakhan, a virulent, anti-Semitic racist, his church gave a lifetime achievement award to Louis Farrakhan. That's been Barack Obama's pastor for 20 years. And we will continue to expose this until somebody in the mainstream media has the courage to take this on."

Salon editor-in-chief Joan Walsh wrote: "the whole idea that Wright has been attacked over 'sound bites,' and if Americans saw his entire sermons, in context, they'd feel differently, now seems ludicrous. The long clips Moyers played only confirm what was broadcast in the snippets". She went on to note: "My conclusion Friday night was bolstered by new tapes of Wright that came out this weekend, including one that captures him saying the Iraq war is 'the same thing al-Qaida is doing under a different color flag,' and a much longer excerpt from the 'God damn America' sermon that denounces 'Condoskeezer Rice ... '".

Fox News' Bill O'Reilly said of Wright, "In my opinion, Rev. Jeremiah Wright is not an honest man. He preaches anti-white and anti-American rhetoric, all the while making money off it."

Cultural critic Kelefa Sanneh traced Wright's theology and rhetoric back to Frederick Douglass, analyzing his 1854 reference to antebellum US Christians as "bad, corrupt, and wicked".

Noting that "many observers argue that Wright's sermons convey a more complex message than simple sound bites can express", the Chicago Tribune published lengthy excerpts in the article "Rev. Jeremiah Wright's words: Sound bite vs. sermon excerpt".

Economist and social commentator Thomas Sowell wrote that there was "no way that [Obama] didn't know about Jeremiah Wright's anti-American and racist diatribes from the pulpit." He wrote that Obama was "no ordinary member" of the church, having once donated $20,000 to it, and that Obama's speech was "like the Soviet show trials during their 1930s purges", intended only to convince supporters.

===== Commentary on media coverage =====
The controversy sparked continuous media coverage, on both national media outlets and local sources. More than 3,000 news stories had been written on the issue by early April.

Wright's church, Trinity United Church of Christ, criticized the media coverage of his past sermons, saying in a statement that Wright's "character is being assassinated in the public sphere. ... It is an indictment on Dr. Wright's ministerial legacy to present his global ministry within a 15- or 30-second sound bite."

Lara Cohen, news director at the Us Weekly, noted that her publication "has been accused of distracting people from the 'Important Issues'" because of its focus on supermarket tabloid concerns, and said that mainstream media "talking heads love to tut-tut about how attention to celebrity gossip is causing the great dumbing down of American society." She charged that, in light of the sensationalized coverage about Wright, mainstream media outlets no longer had grounds to make these criticisms of Us Weekly, and turned the charge back upon the mainstream media. Cohen stated, "The true hallmark of sensationalized journalism is ginning up controversy to drive sales, and for the mainstream news media Wright was a tailor-made tabloid icon. With newspaper sales at record lows, network news ratings tanking and 24-hour news channels desperate to fill up all 24 hours, Wright's outbursts were the mainstream media's equivalent of Tom Cruise jumping on Oprah's couch—a train wreck no one could turn away from. And so they milked it, regardless of the impact on the very race they were supposedly covering objectively."

Republican commentator and former National Security Council staff member Lt. Col. Oliver North (whom Wright mentioned in his controversial comments) said of the controversy's media coverage, "Rather than serving up more blather about Jeremiah Wright, editors, producers and program directors would better serve us all by sending their commentators and correspondents out to cover those who have volunteered to serve in our military."

Stephen Colbert satirized what he portrayed as the media's obsession with the Wright story. Jon Stewart similarly made fun of the media's obsession with Wright, calling it their "Festival of Wrights" and the "Reverending Story".

Investigative journalist Robert Parry contrasted the mainstream media's attention to Wright with its almost total silence on the topic of South Korean religious leader Sun Myung Moon and his relationship with the Republican Party and especially the Bush family.

=== Trinity United Church of Christ members ===
Lisa Miller in Newsweek reported that, before the political controversy erupted, "Trinity was already in the throes of a difficult generational transition." After the period of Wright's speaking engagements before national audiences, Miller describes how "the reaction was anguish and anger" among church members and that three basic factions developed among them: those who wished Wright would not speak anymore, those who believed in what he said, and those who just wished the whole controversy would go away.

=== Academia ===
Many academics commented on Wright, black theology, and the concomitant political controversy within a broader context of American history and culture.

In 2004, prior to the Wright controversy, Anthony E. Cook, a professor of law at Georgetown University, provided a detailed comparative analysis of sermons delivered after 9–11 by Jerry Falwell, T. D. Jakes, and Jeremiah Wright. Cook argued that the overall intent of Falwell's and Jakes's sermons was to use the Christian religion as a justification for the war on terror, while Wright's overall intent was to side against war and to get listeners to engage in introspection about their daily behavior and relationship with God.

After the political controversy erupted, Georgetown University sociology professor Michael Eric Dyson stated, "Patriotism is the affirmation of one's country in light of its best values, including the attempt to correct it when it's in error. Wright's words are the tough love of a war-tested patriot speaking his mind." J. Kameron Carter, associate professor of theology and black church studies at Duke Divinity School, stated that Wright "voiced in his sermons a pain that must be interpreted inside of the tradition of black prophetic Christianity."

Martin E. Marty, an emeritus professor of religious history, criticized reporters' "naiveté" about the civil rights movement. He placed Wright's comments in context of his church: "For Trinity, being 'unashamedly black' does not mean being 'anti-white'". He also argued that black shame was a debilitating legacy of slavery and segregation in society and church, and argued that Trinity's Afrocentrism "should not be more offensive than that synagogues should be 'Judeo-centric' or that Chicago's Irish parishes be 'Celtic-centric'."

Bill J. Leonard—dean of the divinity school and professor of church history at Wake Forest University—argued that Wright "was standing and speaking out of the jeremiad tradition of preaching in the U.S.", which he said "dates back to the Puritans"; Leonard stated that this was something that both "black and white ministers have used since the 17th century in this country." Leonard explains that the jeremiad tradition dealt with "woe and promise and moral failure not only in the church but in the nation." James B. Bennett of Santa Clara University said that Martin Luther King Jr. shared similar feelings with Wright concerning some U.S. activities, quoting King as saying, "the greatest purveyor of violence in the world today — my own government", and that "America was founded on genocide, and a nation that is founded on genocide is destructive."

Stephan Thernstrom, Winthrop professor of history at Harvard, and Abigail Thernstrom, political scientist and the vice chair of the U.S. Commission on Civil Rights, wrote that "[Wright] contended that blacks and whites had completely different brain structures, one left-dominant, the other right-dominant. This is nothing more than an updated version of the pseudo-science once used to defend segregation in the Jim Crow South". They also wrote: "clearly, Rev. Wright does not speak for mainstream black churches — and he has done them a gross disservice by claiming to do so." The New Republic chief editor as well as former Harvard lecturer Martin Peretz concurred, endorsing the article and saying that it "puts Trinity into its proper place in relation to other black churches and shows how different it is from them."

== Subsequent Jeremiah Wright appearances ==
Jeremiah Wright publicly discussed the controversy in depth in an hour-long interview with Bill Moyers on April 25, 2008. This included longer clips of his sermons, along with his explanations of what he was saying. There were also clips of his ministry and parishioners at various points in time since he became pastor in 1972, in an attempt to show what Trinity UCC stands for and has accomplished. Wright stated that his comments were "taken out of context" and that people "who have heard the entire sermon understand the communication perfectly." He went on to say: "When something is taken like a sound bite for a political purpose and put constantly over and over again, looped in the face of the public, that's not a failure to communicate. Those who are doing that are communicating exactly what they want to do, which is to paint me as some sort of fanatic or as the learned journalist from the New York Times called me, a 'wackadoodle'...[referring to an article by Maureen Dowd] The message that is being communicated by the soundbites is exactly what those pushing those sound bites want to communicate." Conservative pundits and PBS's ombudsman criticized Moyers for being too gentle on Wright.

On April 27, Wright gave a keynote address at a fundraising dinner for the Detroit-chapter of the NAACP. In front of nearly 10,000, he discussed the controversy, saying, "I am not running for the Oval Office", referring to what he perceived as Republican attempts to make the controversy part of the campaign. Earlier that day, he delivered a sermon to 4,000 at the Friendship-West Baptist Church in Dallas. On April 28, he spoke to the National Press Club, where he discussed the Black church.

In his speech to the NAACP, Wright speculated that, "Africans have a different meter, and Africans have a different tonality. Europeans have seven tones, Africans have five. White people clap differently than black people. Africans and African-Americans are right-brained, subject-oriented in their learning style. They have a different way of learning." The comments were labeled as racist, and likened to eugenics.

Former aide to President Ronald Reagan David Gergen called Wright's speaking tour "the dumbest, most selfish, most narcissistic thing I've seen in 40 years of covering politics." Libertarian commentator Andrew Sullivan said Wright's comments on the tour were a "calculated, ugly, repulsive, vile display of arrogance, egotism, and self-regard." Former Speaker of the House Newt Gingrich characterized Wright's speaking tour as an attempt to deliberately hurt Obama, and stated that Wright's sense of self-importance appeared to be his motivation. Columnist Bob Herbert of The New York Times also suggested that Wright was being a "narcissist" and trying to "wreck" Obama's campaign.

=== Obama's response ===
Obama attempted to further distance himself from Wright, as he expressed outrage and shock at a press conference on April 29:

I am outraged by the comments that were made and saddened by the spectacle that we saw yesterday ... The person that I saw yesterday was not the person that I met 20 years ago. His comments were not only divisive and destructive, but I believe that they end up giving comfort to those who prey on hate, and I believe that they do not portray accurately the perspective of the black church. They certainly don't portray accurately my values and beliefs. And if Reverend Wright thinks that that's political posturing, as he put it, then he doesn't know me very well. And based on his remarks yesterday, well, I may not know him as well as I thought either. ... What became clear to me is that he was presenting a world view that contradicts who I am and what I stand for, and what I think particularly angered me was his suggestion somehow that my previous denunciation of his remarks were somehow political posturing. Anybody who knows me and anybody who knows what I'm about knows that I am about trying to bridge gaps and I see the commonality in all people. ... [A]fter seeing Reverend Wright's performance, I felt as if there was a complete disregard for what the American people are going through and the need for them to rally together to solve these problems. ... [W]hatever relationship I had with Reverend Wright has changed, as a consequence of this.

==== Reaction ====
Obama's second statement on the controversy elicited a range of responses. Noam Scheiber of The New Republic wrote, "I thought Obama put the distance he needed to between himself and Wright just now ... The other lingering question is whether people will wonder all over again how Obama could have been friends with this guy for 20 years. It's a legitimate concern, but if it didn't weigh him down too much after the Philadelphia speech in March, I wouldn't expect it to do him in this time. Wright's 'performance' yesterday struck me as new and brazen enough to warrant a different reaction than Obama would have had in the past."

Victor Davis Hanson wrote, "Obama, by what he wrote in his memoirs, by what he said when he spoke in his early campaign speeches, by his frequent praise of Wright, and by his 20-year presence in front of, and subsidies to, Wright knew exactly the racist and anti-American nature of his odious pastor." American linguist and social commentator John McWhorter wrote, "now that the Reverend Wright has gone on tour and given us full doses of these professionally alienated postures from another time, it is good to see that Mr. Obama has had the courage to decisively break with him. Sad, too — the man was his pastor, after all. But here is one more way that Mr. Obama is learning what hardball really is."

=== Obama leaves Trinity United Church of Christ ===
On May 31, 2008, Barack and Michelle Obama announced that they had withdrawn their membership in Trinity United Church of Christ, where Wright had previously served as senior pastor, stating that "Our relations with Trinity have been strained by the divisive statements of Reverend Wright, which sharply conflict with our own views".

=== Later impact and continuing controversy ===
Nearly five months after the latest Israeli invasion of Gaza resulting in heavy casualties, on June 9, 2009, in an interview with the Daily Press of Newport News, Wright indicated that he hadn't had contact with Obama up to that point because "Them Jews aren't going to let him talk to me. I told my baby daughter, that he'll talk to me in five years when he's a lame duck, or in eight years when he's out of office." Wright also suggested that Obama did not send a delegation to the Durban Review Conference in Geneva on racism because of Zionist pressure saying: "[T]he Jewish vote, the A-I-P-A-C vote, that's controlling him, that would not let him send representation to the Durban Review Conference, that's talking this craziness on this trip, cause they’re Zionists, they would not let him talk to someone who calls a spade what it is." Writing for The Atlantic, Ta-Nehisi Coates characterized Wright's remarks as "crude conspiratorial antisemitism."

The pro-Israel Anti-Defamation League released a statement condemning Wright's remarks as "inflammatory and false. The notions of Jewish control of the White House in Reverend Wright's statement express classic anti-Semitism in its most vile form." Rabbi Scott Gurdin at Temple Sinai said Wright "is missing an opportunity to build alliances and bridges." The National Jewish Democratic Council distributed a statement reading, "Obama showed good judgment in strongly separating himself from Reverend Jeremiah Wright".

On June 11, 2009, Wright amended his remarks during an interview with Mark Thompson on his radio program, Make it Plain. "Let me say like Hillary, I misspoke. Let me just say: Zionists... I’m not talking about all Jews, all people of the Jewish faith, I’m talking about Zionists." In The Atlantic, Jeffrey Goldberg alleged that "In other words ... [h]e regrets speaking plainly instead of deploying a euphemism."

Wright wrote on his Facebook page apologizing for his remarks on June 12. He wrote, "I mis-spoke and I sincerely meant no harm or ill-will to the American Jewish community or the Obama administration ... I have great respect for the Jewish faith and the foundational (and central) part of our Judeo-Christian tradition." He also stated, "I love President Obama as my son, and support and honor him as the President of the United States of America and leader of the free world." Amos Brown, a former San Francisco supervisor and Baptist pastor, has defended Wright and disputed charges of antisemitism. He said, "[p]eople hear snippets of things and they go running with it rather than sitting down and having a dialogue, the way Jesus engaged people".

== Opinion polling ==
In mid-March 2008, a Rasmussen Reports national telephone poll of voters found that just 8% had a favorable opinion of Jeremiah Wright and 58% had an unfavorable view. 73% of voters believed that Wright's comments were divisive, while 29% of African-Americans said Wright's comments made them more likely to support Obama. 66% of those polled had read, seen, or heard news stories about Wright's comments.

During these events, Hillary Clinton briefly took the lead in the Gallup national tracking poll, ahead of Obama by 7 points on March 18. By March 20, Clinton's lead decreased to 2 points, a statistically insignificant amount. The same day, John McCain took a 3-point lead over both Democratic candidates in hypothetical General Election match ups, with a 2-point margin of error. By March 22, Obama had regained his lead over Clinton and was up by 3 points. The editor-in-chief of the Gallup Poll said that the effect of the controversy "died after a couple of days".

A CBS poll taken from March 15 to March 17 found that sixty-five percent of registered voters said it made no difference in their view of Obama, while thirty percent said it made them have a less favorable view.

At the end of March 2008, as over 40 states had already held their Democratic primary processes, Barack Obama built on his national Gallup daily tracking poll results to become the first candidate to open a double-digit lead since Super Tuesday, when his competitor Clinton had a similar margin. On March 30 the poll showed Obama at 52% and Clinton at 42%. The Rassmussen Reports poll—taken during the same time frame—showed an Obama advantage of five points. These polls followed weeks of heavy campaigning and heated rhetoric from both camps, and another late-March poll found Obama maintaining his positive rating and limiting his negative rating, better than his chief rival Clinton, even considering Obama's involvement in controversy during the period. The NBC News and Wall Street Journal poll showed Obama losing two points of positive rating and gaining four points of negative rating, while Clinton lost eight points of positive rating and gained five points of negative rating.

Following the revival of the controversy surrounding Wright in late April 2008, several polls showed that Obama's image among voters had suffered. According to a Gallup poll, Obama's nationwide favorable rating dropped from 50% to 45%, while Clinton's rating rose to 49%. In this poll, McCain edged Obama by four percentage points in general election match ups, while Clinton was tied with McCain. As of May 5, a Gallup poll of Democratic and Democratic-leaning voters showed Obama with a 5% lead over Clinton for the Democratic nomination.

In poll data released May 3, 2008, from The New York Times and CBS News, Obama's favorable/unfavorable rating among white Democrats remained the same from last summer. During the same period, Clinton's unfavorable rating among black Democrats increased by 36 percentage points. The Times theorized that the opinion shift among blacks was due to tactics of the Clinton campaign labelled "racially tinged" by many vocal elements within the media, including the alleged "amplifying" by Hillary Clinton of the Wright affair at numerous times.

== Comparisons with other candidates ==
Several commentators have drawn comparisons between the media's treatment of Barack Obama and Jeremiah Wright with the treatment of political candidates who ally themselves with white religious leaders who have made controversial statements. These critics said that John McCain actively sought the recommendation of John Hagee, who has been criticized for anti-Catholic and anti-Muslim statements and has described Hurricane Katrina as "the judgment of God on the city of New Orleans" for the city's "level of sin" (specifically a planned gay pride march). E. J. Dionne of The Washington Post contended that white religious leaders who make controversial statements often maintain their political influence. He specifically mentioned the remarks of Jerry Falwell and Pat Robertson, who agreed that gays, feminists, and liberals shared the blame for the 9/11 attacks, but faced no calls for denunciation by politicians with whom they had relationships. Frank Rich of The New York Times wrote that Rudy Giuliani's relationship with Monsignor Alan Placa had gained little media attention. (Placa is a longtime friend of Giuliani and performed his second wedding; Giuliani hired him to work in his consulting firm after Placa was barred from his priestly duties due to sexual abuse allegations.) Conservative commentator John Podhoretz said that the comparison of Wright with Hagee was "entirely specious", because Obama had a longstanding relationship with Wright and McCain had no personal relationship with Hagee.
