= Jeremiah Wright =

American pastor (born 1941)

The Reverend Jeremiah Wright
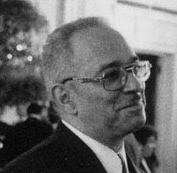
- Wright in 1998
- Born: Jeremiah Alvesta Wright Jr. September 22, 1941 (age 85); Philadelphia, Pennsylvania, U.S.
- Other name: Jerry Wright
- Spouse: Ramah Reed

Ecclesiastical career
- Religion: Christianity
- Church: United Church of Christ
- Ordained: 1967
- Congregations: Trinity United Church of Christ

Academic background
- Education: Virginia Union University; Howard University (BA); University of Chicago (MDiv); United Theological Seminary (DMin)
- Thesis: Black Sacred Music: Problems and Possibilities (1990)
- Doctoral advisor: Samuel DeWitt Proctor
- Influences: James H. Cone

Academic work
- School or tradition: Black liberation theology
- Institutions: United Theological Seminary; Chicago Theological Seminary; Garrett-Evangelical Theological Seminary
- Influenced: Barack Obama
- Military career
- Allegiance: United States
- Branch: United States Marine Corps; United States Navy
- Service years: 1961–1967
- Rank: Private First Class; Hospital Corpsman Third Class
- Units: 2nd Marine Division; Presidential medical team

Jeremiah Alvesta Wright Jr. (born September 22, 1941) is an American Mainline Protestant minister who is pastor emeritus of Trinity United Church of Christ in Chicago, a congregation he led for 36 years, during which its membership grew to over 8,000 parishioners. Following retirement, his beliefs and preaching were scrutinized when segments of his sermons about terrorist attacks on the United States and government dishonesty were publicized in connection with the 2008 presidential campaign of Barack Obama.

== Early years ==
Wright was born on September 22, 1941. He was born and raised in the racially mixed area of Germantown, Philadelphia, Pennsylvania. His parents were Jeremiah Wright Sr. (1909–2001), a Baptist minister who pastored Grace Baptist Church in Germantown from 1938 to 1980, and Mary Elizabeth Henderson Wright, a schoolteacher who was the first Black person to teach an academic subject at Roosevelt Junior High. She went on to be the first Black person to teach at Germantown High and Girls High, where she became the school's first Black vice principal.

Wright graduated from Central High School of Philadelphia in 1959, among the best schools in the area at the time. At the time, the school was around 90 percent white. The 211th class yearbook described Wright as a respected member of the class. "Always ready with a kind word, Jerry is one of the most congenial members of the 211," the yearbook said. "His record in Central is a model for lower class [younger] members to emulate."

== Education and military service ==
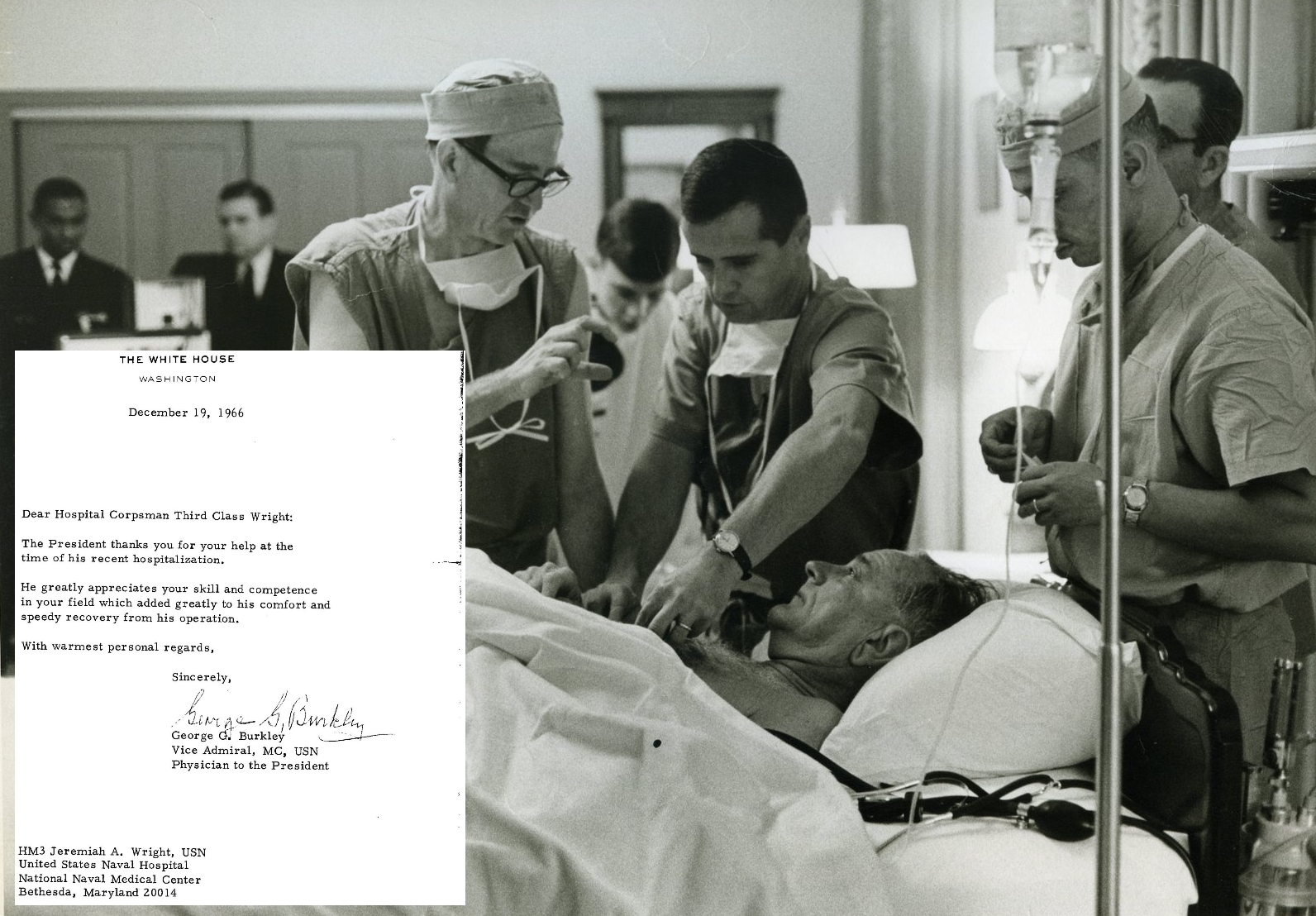
Jeremiah Wright (second from right, behind IV pole), in 1966, as a US Navy Hospital Corpsman. He is tending to President Lyndon Johnson, standing behind him is Bill Moyers. (A letter of thanks on behalf of the President is superimposed on photo).

From 1959 to 1961, Wright attended Virginia Union University, in Richmond and is a member of Omega Psi Phi fraternity, Zeta chapter. In 1961 Wright left college and joined the United States Marine Corps and became part of the 2nd Marine Division attaining the rank of private first class. In 1963, after two years of service, Wright joined the United States Navy and entered the Corpsman School at the Great Lakes Naval Training Center. Wright was then trained as a cardiopulmonary technician at the National Naval Medical Center in Bethesda, Maryland. Wright was assigned as part of the medical team charged with care of President Lyndon B. Johnson (see photo of Wright caring for Johnson after his 1966 surgery). Before leaving the position in 1967, the White House Physician, Vice Admiral Burkley, personally wrote Wright a letter of thanks on behalf of the United States President.

In 1967 Wright enrolled at Howard University in Washington, DC, where he earned a bachelor's degree in 1968 and a master's degree in English in 1969. He also earned a master's degree from the University of Chicago Divinity School. Wright holds a Doctor of Ministry degree (1990) from the United Theological Seminary in Dayton, Ohio, where he studied under Samuel DeWitt Proctor, a mentor to Martin Luther King Jr.

Wright and his wife Ramah Reed Wright have four daughters: Janet Marie Moore, Jeri Lynne Wright, Nikol D. Reed, and Jamila Nandi Wright, and one son, Nathan D. Reed.

== Career as minister ==
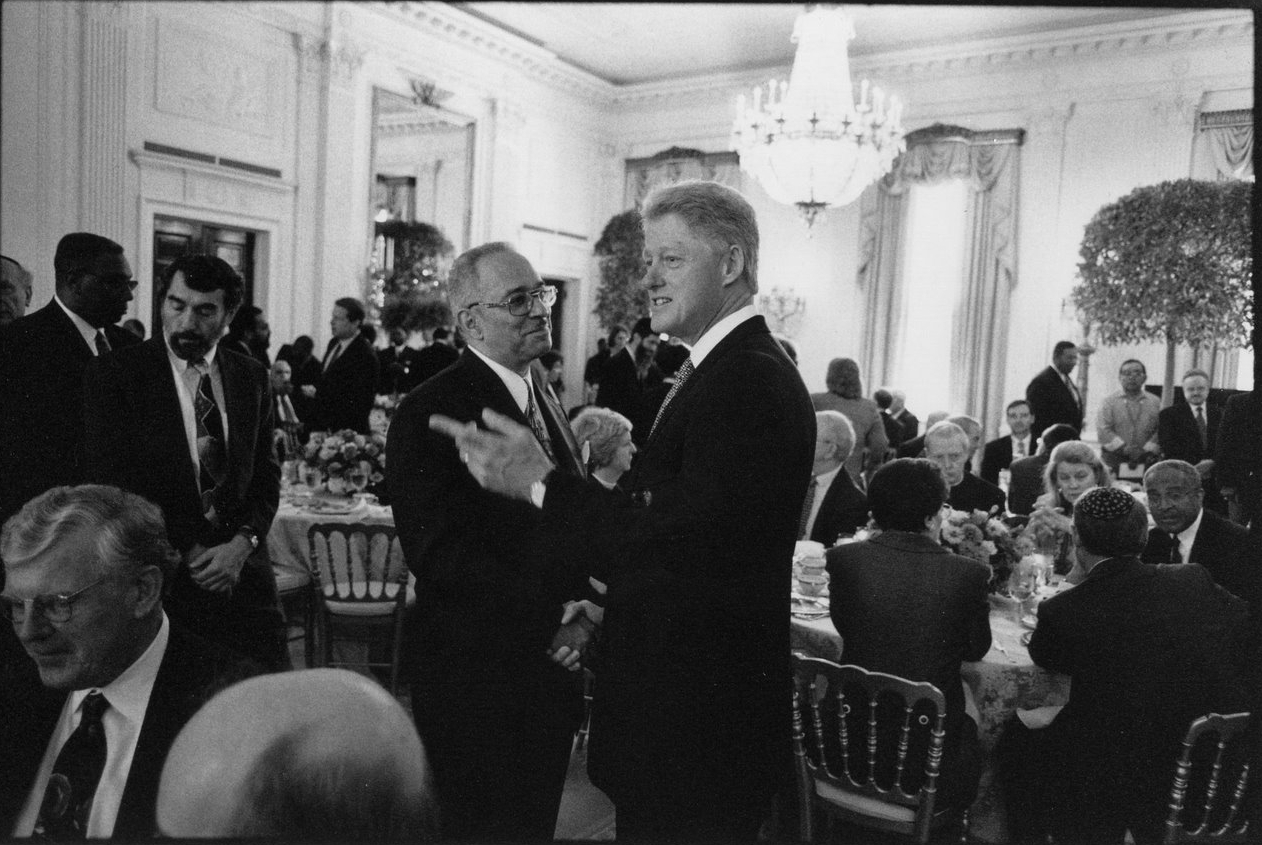
Jeremiah Wright (center left), in 1998, greeting President Bill Clinton during a prayer breakfast at the White House

Wright became pastor of the Trinity United Church of Christ, Chicago on March 1, 1971; it had some 250 members on its rolls, but only about 90 or so were actually attending worship by that time. By March 2008 Trinity United Church of Christ had become the largest church in the mostly white United Church of Christ denomination. The President and General Minister of the United Church of Christ, John H. Thomas, has stated: "It is critical that all of us express our gratitude and support to this remarkable congregation, to Jeremiah A. Wright for his leadership over 36 years." Thomas, who is a member of the Pilgrim Congregational United Church of Christ in Cleveland, has also preached and worshipped at Trinity United Church of Christ (most recently on March 2, 2008).

Trinity and Wright were profiled by correspondent Roger Wilkins in Sherry Jones' documentary Keeping the Faith, broadcast as the June 16, 1987, episode of the PBS series Frontline with Judy Woodruff. In 1995, Wright was asked to deliver a prayer during an afternoon session of speeches at the Million Man March in Washington, DC.

Wright, who began the "Ministers in Training" program at Trinity United Church of Christ, has been a national leader in promoting theological education and the preparation of seminarians for the African American church. The church's mission statement is based upon systematized black theology that started with the works of James Hal Cone.

Wright has been a professor at Chicago Theological Seminary, Garrett–Evangelical Theological Seminary, and other educational institutions. Wright has served on the Board of Trustees of Virginia Union University, Chicago Theological Seminary and City Colleges of Chicago. He has also served on the Board Directors of Evangelical Health Systems, the Black Theology Project, the Center for New Horizons and the Malcolm X School of Nursing, and on boards and committees of other religious and civic organizations.

Wright attended a lecture by Frederick G. Sampson in Richmond, Virginia, in the late 1980s, on the G. F. Watts painting Hope, which inspired him to give a sermon in 1990 based on the subject of the painting – "with her clothes in rags, her body scarred and bruised and bleeding, her harp all but destroyed and with only one string left, she had the audacity to make music and praise God.... To take the one string you have left and to have the audacity to hope... that's the real word God will have us hear from this passage and from Watt's painting." Having attended Wright's sermon, Barack Obama later adapted Wright's phrase "audacity to hope" to "audacity of hope" which became the title for his 2004 Democratic National Convention keynote address, and the title of his second book.

== Controversies ==
Wright, who was Barack Obama's former pastor, gained national attention in March 2008 when ABC News, after reviewing dozens of Wright's sermons, excerpted parts which were subject to intense media scrutiny. Obama denounced the statements in question, but after critics continued to press the issue of his relationship with Wright he gave a speech titled "A More Perfect Union", in which he denounced Wright's remarks, but did not disown him as a person. The controversy began to fade, but was renewed in late April when Wright made a series of media appearances, including an interview on Bill Moyers Journal, a speech at the NAACP and a speech at the National Press Club. After the last of these, Obama spoke more forcefully against his former pastor, saying that he was "outraged" and "saddened" by his behavior, and in May he resigned his membership in the church.

Nearly five months after the late 2008 Israeli invasion of Gaza resulting in heavy casualties, on June 9, 2009, in an interview with the Daily Press of Newport News, Wright indicated that he had no contact with Obama up to that point because "Them Jews aren't going to let him talk to me. I told my baby daughter, that he'll talk to me in five years when he's a lame duck, or in eight years when he's out of office." Wright also suggested that Obama did not send a delegation to the Durban Review Conference in Geneva on racism because of Zionist pressure, saying: "[T]he Jewish vote, the A-I-P-A-C vote, that's controlling him, that would not let him send representation to the Durban Review Conference, that's talking this craziness on this trip, cause they're Zionists, they would not let him talk to someone who calls a spade what it is." Writing for The Atlantic, Ta-Nehisi Coates characterized Wright's remarks as "crude conspiratorial antisemitism." On June 11, 2009, Wright amended his remarks during an interview with Mark Thompson on his radio program, Make it Plain. "Let me say like Hillary, I misspoke. Let me just say: Zionists... I'm not talking about all Jews, all people of the Jewish faith, I'm talking about Zionists."

Wright wrote on his Facebook page apologizing for his remarks on June 12, 2009. He wrote, "I mis-spoke and I sincerely meant no harm or ill-will to the American Jewish community or the Obama administration... I have great respect for the Jewish faith and the foundational (and central) part of our Judeo-Christian tradition." "In other words", Jeffrey Goldberg inferred, also in The Atlantic, "he regrets speaking plainly instead of deploying a euphemism." The pro-Israel Anti-Defamation League released a statement condemning Wright's remarks as "inflammatory and false. The notions of Jewish control of the White House in Reverend Wright's statement express classic anti-Semitism in its most vile form."

In June 2011, in a speech at Empowerment Temple in Baltimore, Wright called the State of Israel "illegal" and "genocidal" and insisted, "To equate Judaism with the state of Israel is to equate Christianity with [rapper] Flavor Flav."

== Retirement ==
Wright retired as pastor from Trinity United Church of Christ in early 2008. Over the course of his tenure, he brought the church's membership from 87 in 1972 to over 8,000 parishioners. Trinity United purchased a lot in Tinley Park, a predominantly white Chicago suburb, and built Wright a 10,340-square-foot (961 m^{2}) home valued at $1.6 million.

In September 2016, Wright had a stroke which paralyzed the left side of his body and left him reliant on a wheelchair; despite the effect on his voice, Wright continues to give sermons on certain occasions.

== Honors ==
Wright has received a Rockefeller Fellowship and seven honorary doctorate degrees, including from Colgate University, Lincoln University (in Pennsylvania), Valparaiso University, United Theological Seminary, Chicago Theological Seminary, and Starr King School for the Ministry. Wright was named one of Ebony magazine's top 15 preachers. He was also awarded the first Carver Medal by Simpson College in January 2008, to recognize Wright as "an outstanding individual whose life exemplifies the commitment and vision of the service of George Washington Carver". On May 1, 2008, Northwestern University withdrew its invitation for him to receive an honorary doctorate in light of the controversy over his recent remarks.

== Works ==
- Jeremiah A. Wright Jr., "Music as Cultural Expression in Black Church Theology and Worship", Journal of Black Sacred Music 3, 1 (1; Spring 1989).
- Wright, Jeremiah A. Jr. and Jini Kilgore Ross, What Makes You So Strong?: Sermons of Joy and Strength from Jeremiah A. Wright Jr., Judson Press, November 1993, ISBN 978-0-8170-1198-7
- Jawanza Kunjufu and Jeremiah Wright Jr., Adam! Where Are You?: Why Most Black Men Don't Go to Church, African American Images, 1997, ISBN 978-0-913543-43-6 (also African American Images, 1994, ASIN B000T6LXPQ)
- Wright, Jeremiah A. Jr. and Colleen Birchett, Africans Who Shaped Our Faith (Student Book and Leader Guide), Urban Ministries, Inc., 1995, ISBN 978-0-940955-29-5
- Wright, Jeremiah A. Jr. and Jini Kilgore Ross, Good News!: Sermons of Hope for Today's Families, Judson Press, 1995, ISBN 978-0-8170-1236-6
- William J. Key, Robert Johnson Smith, Jeremiah A. Wright Jr. and Robert Johnson-Smith, From One Brother to Another: Voices of African American Men, Judson Press, 1996, ISBN 978-0-8170-1250-2
- Frank Madison Reid III, Jeremiah Wright Jr. and Colleen Birchett, When Black Men Stand Up for God: Reflections on the Million Man March, African American Images, 1997, ISBN 978-0-913543-48-1
- Wright, Jeremiah A. Jr., What Can Happen When We Pray: A Daily Devotional, Augsburg Fortress Publishers, 2002, ISBN 978-0-8066-3406-7
- Wright, Jeremiah A. Jr., From One Brother To Another, Volume 2: Voices of African American Men , Judson Press, 2003, ISBN 978-0-8170-1362-2
- Wright, Jeremiah A Jr. (2004), "Doing black theology in the black church", pp. 13–23, 213–214. In Linda E. Thomas (Ed.), Living Stones in the Household of God: The Legacy and Future of Black Theology, Minneapolis: Fortress. ISBN 0-8006-3627-9
- Wright, Jeremiah. "Here I am, send me". In Awakened to a calling: reflections on the vocation of ministry, Ann M. Svennungsen and Melissa Wiginton (Eds.), Nashville: Abingdon Press, 2005. ISBN 0-687-05390-0
- Wright, Jeremiah. "In the Lord's house, on the Lord's day". In Awakened to a calling: reflections on the vocation of ministry, Ann M. Svennungsen and Melissa Wiginton (Eds.), Nashville: Abingdon Press, 2005. ISBN 0-687-05390-0
- Iva E. Carruthers (Editor), Frederick D. Haynes III (Editor), Jeremiah A. Wright Jr. (Editor), Blow the Trumpet in Zion!: Global Vision and Action for the 21st Century Black Church, Augsburg Fortress Publishers, 2005, ISBN 978-0-8006-3712-5
- Ernest R. Flores and Jeremiah A. Wright Jr., Tempted to Leave the Cross: Renewing the Call to Discipleship, Judson Press 2007, ISBN 978-0-8170-1524-4

Wright has written several books and is featured on Wynton Marsalis's album The Majesty of the Blues, where he recites a spoken word piece written by Stanley Crouch, and on the Odyssey Channel series Great Preachers.
