= United Theological Seminary =

Methodist seminary in Ohio, United States

Coordinates: 39.814418°N 84.280324°W

- Type: Private school
- Established: 1871
- Religious affiliation: United Methodist Church
- President: Mark Teasdale
- Students: 642
- Location: Trotwood, Ohio, U.S.
- Campus: Suburban, 80 acres
- Website: united.edu

United Theological Seminary is a United Methodist seminary in Trotwood, Ohio. Founded in 1871 by Milton Wright, the father of the Wright brothers, it was originally sponsored by the Church of the United Brethren in Christ. In 1946, members of the Church of the United Brethren in Christ merged with the Evangelical Church to form the Evangelical United Brethren Church, with which the seminary then became affiliated. When that denomination merged with The Methodist Church in 1968, United Theological Seminary became one of the thirteen seminaries affiliated with the new United Methodist Church (UMC).

The school was known as the Bonebrake Theological Seminary from 1909 to 1954.

Although the seminary is affiliated with the United Methodist denomination, students come from many denominations and are ordained by a wide range of denominations upon graduation. The seminary has several houses of study for specialized ministry training, including a Hispanic House of Study and Korean House of Study. The seminary is also home to the Bishop Bruce Ough Innovation Center.

The seminary has strong ties to the African-American church tradition, with a number of major figures in the American Civil Rights Movement later going on to become students or faculty at United. In recent years, the seminary has become a leading center for discussion of church renewal. It has also been named one of the fastest-growing seminaries in the United States.

== History ==
In 1869, the General Conference of the Church of the United Brethren in Christ voted to create and fund a seminary. The motion was suggested by Milton Wright, who later joined the seminary as the chairman of its first executive committee and named the seminary. The denomination's publishing house was already located in Dayton, making the city an ideal location for its seminary. The school opened as Union Biblical Seminary in Dayton in 1871, operating with two full-time professors. In 1873 the seminary began admitting women. The first graduating class completed their studies in 1874, while the first woman graduated in 1883. An important early supporter of the school was the prominent Rike family, who founded and operated Rike Kumler Co. The school changed its name to Bonebrake Seminary in 1909 to honor Mary and John Bonebrake, who gave the seminary 3,840 acres of land in Kansas in an effort to raise revenue for the school. After the land was sold this amounted to a gift of nearly $100,000. Due to the seminary's growing popularity and increasing enrollment, school officials had already been looking to expand the school's campus. In 1911 the seminary, which had previously consisted of only one building, was able to buy a new 274-acre tract of land which was located a mile and a half away from the seminary's previous plot of land. However, the school did not break ground to build any new facilities until 1920. Eventually the school constructed three buildings on the land, with the new campus being designed by the internationally acclaimed Olmsted Brothers, who also helped design dozens of other national parks, university campuses, and landmarks around the world, including Biltmore Estate, the Jefferson Memorial, and Yosemite National Park and whose father, Frederick Law Olmsted, designed Central Park. The school was able to hire the Olmsted Brothers due to a sizable contribution from John Henry Patterson, the founder of the National Cash Register Company. The three buildings were all completed in 1923, at which time the seminary sold the building it had previously been occupying. The building was bought by the Evangelical School of Theology, which had formerly been located in Reading, Pennsylvania.

In 1943, the United States government established a top-secret testing site at the Bonebrake Theological Seminary for the Dayton Project, which was part of the broader Manhattan Project, where research was conducted on the creation of an atomic bomb and polonium was produced that would eventually be used in the atomic bomb that was dropped on Nagasaki, Japan, on August 9, 1945. After many years of planning the Church of the United Brethren in Christ merged with the Evangelical Church, forming a new denomination which would be called the Evangelical United Brethren Church, with which the seminary then became affiliated. As a result of the merger that created the Evangelical United Brethren Church efforts were made to merge the seminaries of the two denominations. In 1954, United Theological Seminary was formed when the existing Bonebrake Seminary (the former United Brethren seminary) merged with The Evangelical School of Theology (the former Evangelical Church seminary located on the campus of Albright College in Reading, Pennsylvania). Four of the faculty members from the Evangelical School of Theology moved to the new United Seminary in Dayton, Ohio. A new library was constructed in 1952 and a new dormitory completed in 1957, while 1961 saw the completion of a new worship center. In 1968, the Evangelical United Brethren Church and The Methodist Church denominations completed a merger to become the present day United Methodist Church and United Theological Seminary merged. became one of thirteen seminaries affiliated with the new denomination.

The seminary began offering a Doctor of Ministry degree for the first time in 1971, with the first students to receive a doctorate graduating in 1973. The school established the Communication Center in 1973, with a sizable amount of multimedia technology resources and a television production studio. The seminary soon became known as a leader and innovator in religious programming and the application of new technologies to theological education. The seminary was also one of the first seminaries to offer curriculum and research related to biblical storytelling, with New Testament professor Tom Bommershine being credited as the creator of the discipline. The Harriet L. Miller Women's Center was created in 1977 to support theologians and clergy who wished to research or support feminist theology, womanist theology, and mujerista theology. The seminary later hired leading womanist theologian Prathia Hall as director of the center before she was later named dean of the seminary. During the 1970s and 1980s, several other new initiatives were undertaken and the seminary expanded their degree offerings at the masters level to offer two new degree programs. 1992 saw the creation of a Doctor of Missiology degree program. In 1996 a second campus was established in Buffalo, New York, on the campus of Houghton College, which was in existence until 2005, when school officials decided to shut down the campus and allocate funds to improve other institutional programs. Another campus site had earlier been created at the University of Charleston. That campus was later moved to West Virginia Wesleyan College, which is still a popular venue for students living in the Mideastern United States. Two years after celebrating their 130th anniversary in 2001, the seminary formed the Institute for Applied Theology in 2003, which offered courses and workshops to clergy, lay leaders, and community members. In 2012, the seminary changed the name of the Institute for Applied Theology to the School for Discipleship and Renewal, and it continued operating through 2023. The school now offers non-degree resourcing through the Bishop Bruce Ough Innovation Center, launched in 2020, and the Fire Academy, introduced in 2024. The seminary introduced a Doctor of Theology degree in 2024.

In 2005, the seminary moved their campus from Dayton to the suburb of Trotwood, purchasing property at 4501 Denlinger Road, Dayton, Ohio, that was formerly owned by the Dayton Jewish Federation. The school's campus now sits on an eighty-acre piece of land just inside the Trotwood city limits. The main building on the property, formally known as the Jesse Phillips Building, was renovated, and the 78,000-square-foot space now houses the seminary's classrooms, faculty offices, student lounge, and library. O'Brien Library, named for two former longtime librarians at the school, features a replica Wright Glider to commemorate Dayton's aviation heritage and the leadership of Milton Wright (father of the Wright Brothers) at the seminary, as well as the Uncial 0206, which are a group of manuscripts from the Oxyrhynchus Papyri. The library currently holds over 150,000 books, periodicals, journal articles, audio and visual materials, and other resources. During the 2000s United has developed several distance learning programs and continues to attract students from nearly every state in the United States, as well as from a number of countries around the world. The school celebrated its 140th anniversary in 2011. In 2012 the school was named one of the fastest-growing seminaries in the United States. As of 2012, there are over 5,500 living alumni/ae who are living in all fifty states and over thirty countries around the world. The school has also become a leading center for discussion of church renewal and offers a variety of resources on the subject.

== Academics ==
The seminary offers Master of Divinity (M.Div.), Master of Theological Studies (M.T.S.), Master of Arts in Christian Ministries (M.A.C.M.), Master of Ministry (M.Min.) and Master of Arts (M.A.) degrees at the masters level, as well as a Doctor of Ministry (D.Min.) and Doctor of Theology (Th.D.) degrees at the doctoral level. Students in the Master of Divinity program can choose a number of concentrations, such as Church Renewal, Pastoral Caregiving and Wesleyan and Methodist Studies. Students who live in a geographic area where theological education is not readily accessible can choose one of the seminary's online programs.

The school's Doctor of Ministry program is one of the largest in the nation. Students in the program can choose from over forty concentrations, which each involve participation in a peer focus group cohort led by a faculty mentor specializing in the given concentration. United also offers a number of non-degree programs. The seminary also offers an Online Teaching and Learning Certificate (OTLC) for professors, pastors, and administrators who are hoping to expand their expertise in distance learning and online education. The school also houses the Bishop Bruce Ough Innovation Center and the Fire Academy, which offer classes and resourcing for enrolled students, clergy, and lay leaders. In February 2013, the seminary created a new online Hispanic lay ministry school as part of its Center for Hispanic/Latino Ministries. In 2021, the Hispanic Christian Academy became the Hispanic House of Study, offering a Master of Divinity in Spanish, as well as certificate programs for laity and clergy.

== Accreditation ==
United Theological Seminary is accredited by the Association of Theological Schools and the Higher Learning Commission of the North Central Association of Colleges and Schools.

== Annual events and lectures ==
The seminary hosts and sponsors a number of conferences, workshops, lectures, and other events every year. In 2012 under Professor Peter Bellini, United began its annual Holy Spirit Seminar, which is one of the most widely attended events held by the seminary. The Holy Spirit Seminar, a conference on church renewal, features speakers and themes from a charismatic or renewalist perspective. The Fire Academy, United's non-degree programs, offers three seminars a year for clergy and laity, The Holy Spirit Seminar, The X-Seminar (healing & deliverance), and the Radical Discipleship Seminar. The seminary also hosts the annual J. Arthur Heck Lectures, which has welcomed speakers such as Walter Brueggemann, Craig A. Evans, and Ted Peters.

Other speakers to be featured in recent events include William Willimon, Geoffrey Wainwright, William Abraham, Leonard Sweet, Don Saliers, Amos Yong, Peter Bellini, Randy Clark, Kenneth Copeland, Violet L. Fisher, Ellen Charry and Jonathan Wilson-Hartgrove.

The seminary also co-sponsored the annual Change the World conference hosted by Ginghamsburg Church, which included such speakers as Greg Boyd, Brian McLaren, Jim Wallis, Ron Sider, Alan Hirsch, Michael Frost, Adam Hamilton, and Ruby Payne. It also co-sponsors the Ryterband Symposium with the University of Dayton and Wright State University, which featured Joel S. Kaminsky and Joel N. Lohr in 2023 and Naomi Seidman in 2024.

United also hosted the 2012 Jesus Conference in which a number of issues related to the Historical Jesus were discussed. Scholars such as Dale Allison, Loren Stuckenbruck and Mark Goodacre, among others, spoke at the event.

The influential rabbi Brad Hirschfield has also spoken at the seminary on multiple occasions in recent years. Cornel West, has also spoken at seminary events (and formerly taught in the D.Min. program).

Martin Luther King Jr. spoke at the seminary on several occasions.

== Center for Evangelical United Brethren Heritage ==
A part of United's archives is its Center for Evangelical United Brethren Heritage, which manages archives related to the Evangelical United Brethren and other related denominations.

== Notable alumni ==
- DeForest Soaries (D.Min.) – pastor, politician, author and public advocate. Former Secretary of State of New Jersey.
- Floyd H. Flake (D.Min.) – pastor of the 23,000 member Greater Allen A. M. E. Cathedral of New York; president of Wilberforce University and U.S. Congressman.
- Stuart C. Lord (D.Min.) – education scholar, sociologist, and president of Naropa University.
- Vashti Murphy McKenzie (D.Min.) – first woman to become a bishop in the African Methodist Episcopal Church; member of the White House Office of Faith-Based and Neighborhood Partnerships.
- Suzan Johnson Cook (D.Min.) – current U.S. State Department Ambassador appointed by President Barack Obama, former policy advisor to President Bill Clinton, and the first female senior pastor in the history of the American Baptist Churches USA.
- Lynn Schofield Clark (M.A.) – scholar, media critic and notable figure in the fields of media studies and film studies.
- Clyde A. Lynch (B.D.) – president of Lebanon Valley College
- Jeremiah Wright (D.Min.) – longtime senior pastor of the famous Trinity United Church of Christ in Chicago, pastor to President Barack Obama, who attended the church for over two decades; major figure in black theology.
- Otis Moss Jr. (D.Min.) – pastor, Civil Rights Movement icon, close friend and advisor of Martin Luther King Jr. and Martin Luther King Sr., father of Otis Moss III, and member of the White House Office of Faith-Based and Neighborhood Partnerships.
- Vernon K. Robbins (M.Div.) – New Testament scholar.
- Dwight Clinton Jones (D.Min.) – current mayor of Richmond, Virginia and former member of the Virginia House of Delegates.
- John C. Dorhauer (D.Min.) – general minister & president of the United Church of Christ.
- Boise Kimber (D.Min.) – pastor and civil rights activist; director of the National Action Network and president of the Connecticut State Missionary Baptist Convention.
- Howard Storm (M.Div.) – former atheist and professor at Northern Kentucky University who gained fame and became a pastor after having a near-death experience.
- Paul Eugene Virgil Shannon (M.Div) – bishop in the Evangelical United Brethren Church.
- Marshall Gilmore (D.Min. in 1974) – bishop of the Christian Methodist Episcopal Church.
- W. Maynard Sparks (M.Div.) – bishop in the Evangelical United Brethren and United Methodist churches.
- Thomas Bickerton (D.Min.) – bishop of the Western Pennsylvania Conference of the United Methodist Church
- Barbara Ann Reynolds (D.Min.) – noted African-American journalist and author known in part for her biography of Jesse Jackson.
- Donald Hilliard – noted African-American preacher.
- Rudy Rasmus – pastor of St. John's UMC in Houston, influential church and home church of Beyoncé.
- Mayte Richardson – pastor with the United Brethren Church
- Char Samuelson (M.Div.) – former member of the Minnesota House of Representatives.
- Leonard N. Smith – pastor of the Mount Zion Baptist Church in Arlington, Virginia.
- Charlene P. Kammerer (D.Min.) – bishop in the United Methodist Church and faculty member of Candler School of Theology at Emory University.
- Melvin O. McLaughlin (M.Div.) – U.S. Congressman and president of York College.
- Dave Koehler – (M.Div.) – Illinois state senator.
- Amos C. Brown (D.Min.) – pastor of the well-known Third Baptist Church of San Francisco, attended by Kamala Harris, and president of the San Francisco branch of the NAACP.
- William Henry Fitzjohn – Sierra Leonean clergyman and diplomat.
- Tracy Smith Malone-bishop in the United Methodist Church.
- Paul Abels – first openly gay man to serve as a pastor in a major Christian denomination.
- Stefanie Minatee- singer-songwriter and musician.
- Patrick Matolengwe- South African Anglican bishop.
- Leonzo D. Lynch – president of the General Baptist State Convention of North Carolina Inc. and senior pastor of Ebeneezer Baptist Church of Charlotte, North Carolina.

== Notable faculty ==
- Leonard Sweet – former professor and president of the seminary.
- Andrew S. Park – current professor of theology and ethics and pioneer of Asian American liberation theology.
- Samuel DeWitt Proctor – former professor, leading figure in the Civil Rights Movement, and close friend of Martin Luther King Jr.
- Wyatt Tee Walker – former professor and dean who was a notable figure in the Civil Rights Movements and close friend of Martin Luther King Jr.
- Gayraud Wilmore – former professor, ethicist, and notable figure in the Civil Rights Movement and black theology.
- Prathia Hall – former professor, dean, prominent figure in womanist theology, ethicist, and Civil Rights Movement activist.
- Emerson Stephen Colaw – former professor and president of the seminary as well as United Methodist Bishop.
- Irwin Kula – influential rabbi, public intellectual, and president of the National Jewish Center for Learning and Leadership.
- Lillian Resler Keister Harford – church organizer and author
- Ella Pearson Mitchell African-American preacher and academic
