= Barbara Reynolds (disambiguation) =

Barbara Reynolds (1914–2015), English academic and translator

Barbara Reynolds may also refer to:

- Barbara Ann Reynolds (born 1942), American journalist
- Barbara Leonard Reynolds (1915–1990), American author and peace activist
