= P88 =

P88 may refer to:

- HMAS Arrow (P 88), a patrol boat of the Royal Australian Navy
- Papyrus 88, a biblical manuscript
- Walther P88, a pistol
- WM P88, a sports prototype racing car
- P88, a state regional road in Latvia
