= University Senate (United Methodist Church) =

Body to oversee all its affiliated schools, colleges, universities

The University Senate of the United Methodist Church is a body to oversee all its affiliated schools, colleges, universities.

== United Methodist Church ==
The United Methodist Church has a University Senate elected by the General Conference of the United Methodist Church to determine which schools, colleges, universities, and theological schools meet the criteria for listing as institutions affiliated with the United Methodist Church (UMC). Established in 1892 as one of the earliest accrediting agencies in the United States, the Senate is charged with reviewing Methodist-affiliated schools, colleges, universities, and theological schools maintain "institutional integrity, well-structured programs, sound management, and clearly defined Church relationships". To maintain high standards for Methodist related institutions, accreditation by the regional accrediting body is required for listing by the University Senate, so in recent years their focus has been more on the ways in which institutions are related to the United Methodist Church.

The UMC has more colleges, universities, theological schools and preparatory schools related to it than any other Protestant denomination, and 119 schools are currently listed as meeting the approved guidelines of the University Senate.

== See also ==
- United Methodist Seminaries
- International Association of Methodist-related Schools, Colleges, and Universities
