= List of Washington Journal programs aired in February 1995 =

The C-SPAN news and interview program Washington Journal has been presented live every day of the year from January 4, 1995, through the present, with very few exceptions. Programs are typically a mix of politically themed interviews, viewer calls and emails, discussion of current events, and reviews of that morning's newspapers.

In the table below, guests are listed in alphabetical order, rather than the order in which they appeared on the program. They are also listed with the position or affiliation they held at the time of their appearance.

== Table of programs ==
Date (w/link to video)	Approx. run time	Host(s)	Guests	Comments and summary
Wednesday, February 1, 1995	2 hr. 59 min.	Steve Scully	Sergio Aguayo (Professor, College of Mexico); Robert L. Bartley (Editor, Wall Street Journal); James K. Glassman (Columnist, Washington Post); William Kristol (Director, Project for a Republican Future); Madeleine M. Kunin (Deputy Secretary, Department of Education); Alfred Lott (Representative, World War II Commemoration Committee); Tim Loughran (Correspondent, Bloomberg Business News); Former Sen. George S. McGovern (D-SD); Nadine Strossen (President, American Civil Liberties Union)	"Mr. Glassman and Mr. Loughran talked about the financial situation in Mexico and the president’s plan concerning aid to Mexico. Mr. Loughran participated from Mexico City via telephone. In the newspaper roundtable, Mr. McGovern and Mr. Kristol discussed various headlines from newspapers around the country. Via remote link, Ms. Kunin talked about the state of education in America. Ms. Strossen discussed her new book Defending Pornography: Free Speech, Sex and the Fight for Women’s Rights. Lieutenant Colonel Lott talked about events that will honor African Americans who fought in World War II. Others reacted to the situation in Mexico and the president’s plan concerning aid to Mexico in telephone interviews."
Thursday, February 2, 1995	1 hr. 30 min.	Susan Swain	Laurie Goodstein (Correspondent, Washington Post); Laura Murphy Lee (Washington D.C. Director, American Civil Liberties Union); Mark R. Levin (Director, Center for Civil Rights, Landmark Legal Foundation); David M. Wessel (Correspondent, Wall Street Journal)	"Ms. Goodstein discussed the National Prayer Breakfast. In the newspaper roundtable Ms. Lee and Mr. Levin discussed various headlines from newspapers around the country, including welfare reform and the balanced budget amendment."
Friday, February 3, 1995	2 hr. 43 min.	Brian Lamb; Connie Doebele	Peter G. Gosselin (Correspondent, Boston Globe); Michael Kelly (Correspondent, The New Yorker); Rep. Bill Luther (D-MN); Virginia Postrel (Editor, Reason Magazine); Albert Shanker (President, American Federation of Teachers); Rep. Roger Wicker (R-MS)	"Mr. Gosselin talked about this week’s activities in Congress and the president’s budget plan. In the newspaper roundtable, Mr. Kelly and Ms. Postrel discussed headlines from various papers across the country. In a point-counterpoint discussion, Reps. Luther and Wicker discussed the House freshman classes. Via remote link, Mr. Shanker discussed school safety and discipline."
Sunday, February 5, 1995	1 hr. 29 min.	Steve Scully	Kenneth Adelman (Columnist, Tribune Company); Joyce Ann Ladner (President, Howard University); Brad O'Leary (President, P/M Consulting Corp.); Todd S. Purdum (Correspondent, New York Times)	"Interviews, video clips and vignettes illustrated the political issues and events of the previous week. Topics included tariffs on China, U.S. economy, and minimum wage."
Monday, February 6, 1995	2 hr. 59 min.	Brian Lamb; Connie Doebele	Ken Auletta (Telecommunications Columnist, The New Yorker); Georgie Anne Geyer (Syndicated Columnist, Universal Press Syndicate); Dorothy Butler Gilliam (Columnist, Washington Post); Robert Greenstein (Founder and Executive Director, Center on Budget and Policy Priorities); George Hager (Correspondent, Congressional Quarterly); Stephen "Steve" Moore (Senior Fellow, Cato Institute)	"By telephone, Mr. Hager talked about the federal budget, which President Clinton released later in the morning. In the newspaper roundtable, Ms. Geyer and Ms. Gilliam reviewed major news stories, including China’s economy and affirmative action. Then Mr. Greenstein and Mr. Cato discussed the federal budget. In the final segment, Mr. Auletta discussed his article about Democratic and Republican differences over the F.C.C."
Tuesday, February 7, 1995	2 hr. 31 min.	Lew Ketcham	Rep. Henry J. Hyde (R-IL); Rep. Peter "Pete" King (R-NY); Jose Nino (President, U.S. Hispanic Chamber of Commerce); Rep. Steven Schiff (R-NM); Rep. Robert "Bobby" Scott (D-VA); Rep. Harold Lee Volkmer (D-MO); William Welch (Congressional Correspondent, USA Today)	"In the first segment Mr. Welch described yesterday’s House passage of the Line-Item Veto bill and continuing Senate debate on the Balanced Budget Amendment. In the newspaper roundtable Representatives King and Volkmer discussed current news topics. In the next segment, Representatives Schiff and Scott, who are both Judiciary Committee members, debated the Republican crime legislation revisions, which the House would take up later in the day. In the last segment, Mr. Nino talked about the agenda for the Hispanic Chamber of Commerce Meeting later in the day."
Wednesday, February 8, 1995	2 hr. 38 min.	Steve Scully	Peter Applebome (Correspondent, New York Times); Moshe Arens (Israeli Defense Minister); Elizabeth Birch (Executive Director, Human Rights Campaign Fund); Rep. Bill Emerson (R-MO); Robert Greene (Agriculture Correspondent, Associated Press; Lloyd Grove (Correspondent, Washington Post); Stanley "Bruce" Herschensohn (Correspondent, KABC-TV); Jeanne Ponessa (Correspondent, Congressional Quarterly)	"In the first segment Ms. Ponessa discussed regulatory reform in Congress. Mr. Greene discussed the Agriculture Department proposals in the Fiscal Year 1996 federal budget. In the newspaper roundtable, the guests discussed abortion issues and other topics. Rep. Emerson participated by remote connection to discuss welfare reform. In the last segment, Israeli Defense Minister Arens discussed his book, Broken Covenant. Mr. Applebome called in to discuss his article on Americorps in today’s New York Times and to compare the program with the 1960s Peace Corps."
Thursday, February 9, 1995	2 hr. 41 min.	Lew Ketcham; Steve Scully; Susan Swain	Martin Crutsinger (Senior Writer, Economics, Associated Press); Serge Kovaleski (Correspondent, Washington Post; Lawrence "Larry" Kudlow (Economics Editor, National Review); David Lawsky (Correspondent, Reuters News Service); Martin Walker (Washington Office Bureau Chief, The Guardian) Brian Welch (Spokesman, NASA); Gov. Pete Wilson (R-CA)	"In the first segment Mr. Lawsky discussed the Balanced Budget Amendment. In the federal budget segment, Mr. Crutsinger described the Commerce Department budget proposal. In the newspaper roundtable Kudlow and Walker discussed a variety of topics. In the final segment, Governor Wilson talked about immigration issues and the proposed federal budget."
Friday, February 10, 1995	1 hr. 41 min.	Connie Doebele	James Atlas (Correspondent, New York Times Magazine); Ann Cooper (South Africa Correspondent, National Public Radio); Peter Copeland (Correspondent, Scripps Howard News Service); Tom Rosenstiel (Correspondent, Newsweek); Josette Sheeran Shiner (Correspondent, Washington Times)	"In the first segment Ms. Cooper, from Johannesburg, discussed the fifth anniversary of South African President Nelson Mandela’s release after 18 years in prison. In the federal budget segment Mr. Copeland discussed Defense Department budget proposals. In the newspaper roundtable Mr. Rosenstiel and Ms. Shiner discussed former Vice President Quayle's withdrawal from the Republican presidential race and other topics. Mr. Atlas talked about his New York Times Magazine cover story titled, “Look Who’s the Opinion Elite Now,” which examined young conservative thinkers. Senator Pryor talked about the career of former Senator William Fulbright who died yesterday."
Sunday, February 12, 1995	1 hr. 30 min.	Steve Scully	Gary Barrett (Correspondent, WHO-Radio, Des Moines); Michael Gartner (Publisher, Ames Daily Tribune); Jack Heath (News Director, WMUR-TV, Manchester, NH); William Meyers (Business Editor, U.S. News & World Report); Jody Powell (Former White House Press Secretary)	"Interviews, video clips and vignettes illustrated the political issues and events of the previous week, focusing on issues in Iowa and the Midwest. Mr. Peterson and Mr. Kennedy discussed state and national politics and the Iowa primary, which will be held in February next year and will be the first national primary of the 1996 campaign. Other topics included the nomination of Dr. Henry Foster to fill the post of surgeon general. Video clips of the C-SPAN School Bus at the capitol steps of Des Moines were also shown."
Monday, February 13, 1995	2 hr. 59 min.	Connie Doebele	Fred Barnes (Senior Editor, (New Republic); Joan Biskupic (Supreme Court Correspondent, Washington Post); David L. Boren (President, University of Oklahoma); Carl P. Leubsdorf (Washington Bureau Chief, Dallas Morning News); Pamela Maraldo (President, Planned Parenthood Federation of America); Mark Pitsch (Correspondent, Education Week Magazine); Barbara Reynolds (Editor, USA Today); Michael D. Tanner (Director, Project on Social Security Choice, Cato Institute)	"Mr. Leubsdorf talked about presidential politics. Via telephone, Mr. Pitsch talked about the Education Department budget. In the newspaper roundtable, Mr. Barnes and Ms. Reynolds discussed headlines from various papers across the country. In a point-counterpoint discussion, Ms. Maraldo and Mr. Tanner discussed the surgeon general’s office. Mr. Boren discussed his political career and his new position as president of the University of Oklahoma. Via telephone, Ms. Biskupic talked about President Clinton and his Supreme Court nominee choices."
Tuesday, February 14, 1995	2 hr. 29 min.	Lew Ketcham; Susan Swain	Brian Atwood (Administrator, U.S. Agency for International Development); Jeff Barber (Managing Editor, Inside Energy); Robert "Bob" L. Borosage, (Professor, Institute for Policy Studies); Becky Cain (President, League of Women Voters); Rep. David Funderburk (R-NC); Thelma LeBrecht (Congressional Correspondent, Associated Press); Rep. W. "Billy" J. Tauzin II (D-LA); Rep. Curt Weldon (R-PA)	"Ms. LeBrecht talked about the crime legislation that is currently being considered on the House floor. Via telephone, Mr. Barber talked about the Energy Department budget. In the newspaper roundtable, Mr. Atwood and Mr. Funderburk discussed headlines from various papers across the country. Via remote link, Mr. Tauzin talked about the new caucus that he along with several other conservative Democrats, are forming. In a point-counterpoint discussion, Mr. Borosage and Rep. Weldon discussed national security. Ms. Cain discussed the League of Women Voter’s accomplishments as the group celebrates its 75th anniversary."
Wednesday, February 15, 1995	3 hr. 1 min.	Bruce Collins; Steve Scully	Douglas J. Besharov (Resident Scholar, American Enterprise Institute); David Boaz (Executive Vice President, Cato Institute); Keller Freeman; Sen. Kay Bailey Hutchison (R-TX); Howard Kurtz (Media Affairs Correspondent, Washington Post); Charles Lewis (Founder and Executive Director, Center for Public Integrity); Will Marshall (Founder and President, Progressive Policy Institute); Rae Tyson (Environmental Issues Correspondent, USA Today); Jill Zuckman (Correspondent, Boston Globe)	"Ms. Zuckman talked about the continuing debate in the Senate of the Balanced Budget Amendment. Via telephone, Mr. Tyson talked about environmental issues and the impact these issues have on the federal budget. In the newspaper roundtable, Mr. Lewis and Mr. Boaz discussed headlines from various papers across the country. In a point-counterpoint discussion, Mr. Marshall and Mr. Besharov discussed welfare reform. Via telephone, Senator Hutchison talked about IRA equity for women at home. Via telephone, Mr. Kurtz talked about top editors stepping down. Ms. Freeman, who is the author of Shadow of Suribachi, talked about the events surrounding the 50th anniversary of the flag raising at Iwo Jima."
Thursday, February 16, 1995	2 hr. 1 min.	Susan Swain	James H. Billington (Librarian of Congress, United States ); Richard Blow (Correspondent, Regardoe's Magazine); Rep. Chaka Fattah (D-PA); Sen. Bob Graham (D-FL); Craig Havighurst (Editor, Medicine and Health); Rep. Suellen "Sue" Myrick (R-NC); Eric Pianin (Correspondent, Washington Post); Pat Towell (Correspondent, Congressional Quarterly)	"Mr. Towell talked about what is happening with the defense policy debate on the House floor. Via telephone, Mr. Havighurst talked about the Health and Human Services Department budget. In the newspaper roundtable, Reps. Fattah and Myrick discussed headlines from various papers across the country. Via telephone, Mr. Blow talked about the Republicans in the House changing peoples lives. Via telephone, Mr. Pianin talked about a draft of a Republican report to help balance the budget. Via remote link, Senator Graham talked about his request for federally funded agencies to not purchase advertising during TV shows that contain violence. Mr. Billington discussed the “THOMAS,” the new electronic information system about the Congress."
Friday, February 17, 1995	2 hr. 59 min.	Brian Lamb; Connie Doebele	Michael Barone (Senior Writer, U.S. News & World Report); Steve Daley (Correspondent, Chicago Tribune); Steven Holmes (Correspondent, New York Times); Judy Keen (Correspondent, USA Today); Peter Maas (Correspondent, Parade Magazine); Richard Newpher (Representative, American Farm Bureau Federation); Paul Nyhan (Correspondent, Congressional Quarterly); Jonathon Tolman (Representative, Competitive Enterprise Institute); Michael Treacy	"Mr. Holmes talked about the NAACP’s elections this weekend for board chairman. Via telephone, Mr. Nyhan talked about the Housing and Urban Development Department budget. In the newspaper roundtable, Mr. Barone and Mr. Daley discussed headlines from various papers across the country. Via telephone, Ms. Keen talked about her article in USA Today about the Whitewater investigation. Via telephone, Mr. Maas talked about his article in Parade Magazine about President Clinton’s administration. In a point-counterpoint discussion, Mr. Newpher and Mr. Tolman discussed agriculture subsidy. Mr. Treacy talked about his recent book The Discipline of Market Leaders."
Sunday, February 19, 1995	1 hr. 57 min.	Steve Scully	Richard L. Berke (Politics Correspondent, New York Times); Patrick J. Buchanan, Political Analyst, CNN); Chris Matthews (Washington Bureau Chief, San Francisco Examiner); Kathleen Matthews (News Correspondent, WJLA-TV, Washington, D.C.); Joseph McQuaid (Editor-in-Chief, Union Leader, Manchester, NH); Gov. Stephen Merrill (R-NH); Sen. Arlen Specter (R-PA)	"Interviews, video clips and vignettes illustrated the political issues and events of the previous week. Topics included the 1996 presidential campaign and Republican politics."
Monday, February 20, 1995	3 hr. 1 min.	Brian Lamb	Joseph A. Califano Jr. (Founder, Chair and President, National Center on Addiction and Substance Abuse); Bill Clark (Officer, National Park Service); Josef Hebert (Environment Correspondent, Associated Press); Christopher Hitchens (Columnist, The Nation); Peter Hitchens (Washington D.C. Correspondent, London Daily Express); Kevin Landrigan (Politics Correspondent, Nashua (NH) Telegraph); Fred Voss (Curator, Smithsonian Institution's National Portrait Gallery)	"On the 100th anniversary of Frederick Douglass’s death, Mr. Clark was interviewed from the Douglass home in Anacostia, Virginia. In the federal budget segment, Mr. Hebert reviewed the Interior Department budget proposal. Mr. Voss described the new Frederick Douglass exhibit at the National Portrait Gallery. Mr. Landrigan talked about the atmosphere in New Hampshire one year before the presidential primaries there. Former HEW Secretary Califano talked about his new book, Radical Surgery: What’s Next for America’s Health Care?"
Tuesday, February 21, 1995	3 hr.	Lew Ketcham; Susan Swain	Raymond Chretien (Canadian Ambassador to the United States); Richard S. Dunham (Politics Correspondent, Business Week); Frank Kruesi (Assistant Secretary for Transportation Policy, U.S. Department of Transportation); Rep. James L. Oberstar (D-MN); Ron Ostrow (Correspondent, Los Angeles Times); Martha Phillips (Executive Director, Concord Coalition); Spencer Rich (Correspondent, Washington Post); C. DeLores Tucker (Chairman, National Congress of Black Women)	"Mr. Dunham talked about tax deductions for the self-employed for health care costs which the House would debate later in the day. To obtain such deductions, Republicans want to cut a federal program that provides tax credits to facilitate minority ownership of radio and television entities. Mr. Ostrow talked about the 1996 Justice Department budget by telephone. In the newspaper roundtable, Ms. Phillips and Ms. Tucker talked about current issues including the balanced budget amendment and the fight over affirmative action. In the next segment, Rep. Oberstar and Mr. Kruesi discussed whether and how much the FAA should be privatized. Next, Mr. Rich talked about the role of Social Security in the conflict over how to balance the budget. In the last segment, Ambassador talked about President Clinton’s trip to Canada and current issues in Canadian politics."
Wednesday, February 22, 1995	2 hr. 7 min.	Steve Scully	L. Brent Bozell III (Founder, Media Research Center); Farai Chideya; Asra Q. Nomani (Correspondent, Wall Street Journal); Leslie Phillips (Correspondent, USA Today); Richard Sammon (Correspondent, CQ Daily Monitor); David A. Vise (Correspondent Washington Post); Amelie Wogan (Director, Standard and Poor's)	"Mr. Sammon reviewed the first 50 days of the Republican “Contract with America.” Ms. Phillips talked about Republican changes in welfare, including school lunches. Ms. Nomani talked about the 1996 Labor Department budget. In the newspaper roundtable, Ms. Chideya and Mr. Bozell talked about such issues as economic empowerment for African-Americans and public views on congressional performance. During this segment, Mr. Vise talked about the District of Columbia’s financial difficulties. In the next segment, Ms. Wogan also talked about the district’s financial woes."
Thursday, February 23, 1995	2 hr. 41 min.	Lew Ketcham; Susan Swain	George Gedda (State Department Correspondent, Associated Press); Elizabeth MacDonald (Correspondent, Worth Magazine); Joe Madison (Talk Show Host, TPT News); Edwin Meese III (Former Attorney General, Department of Justice); Margaret Ann Reigle (Founder, Fairness to Land Owners Committee); Jonathan Turley (Public Interest Law Professor, George Washington University); Craig Turner (Canadian Bureau Correspondent, Los Angeles Times)	"Mr. Turner discussed President Clinton’s upcoming trip to Canada and the status of relations between the U.S. and Canada. Mr. Gedda discussed the Clinton administration’s budget proposal for the Department of State. In the newspaper roundtable, Mr. Madison and Mr. Meese discussed recent events in the news. Professor Turley and Ms. Reigle talked about individual property rights and the federal government. In the final segment, Ms. McDonald reviewed her article in Worth magazine on the Internal Revenue Service (IRS) and problems in the way the IRS operates."
Friday, February 24, 1995	2 hr.	Brian Lamb	Lisa Burgess (Transportation Correspondent, Journal of Commerce); Michael Frisby (White House Correspondent, Wall Street Journal); Major E. Garrett (Congressional Correspondent, Washington Times); Ford Peatross (Architecture Curator, Library of Congress); Pamela Scott (Guest Curator, Library of Congress)	"Via remote, Mr. Peatross talked about the new Temple of Liberty exhibit which is on display at the Library of Congress. Via telephone, Ms. Burgess talked about the Transportation Department budget. In the newspaper roundtable, Mr. Frisby and Mr. Garrett discussed headlines from various papers across the country. Via remote, Ms. Scott talked about the new Temple of Liberty exhibit that opened today at the Library of Congress."
Sunday, February 26, 1995	1 hr. 29 min.	Steve Scully	Rep. Thomas DeLay (R-TX); Brian Duffy (Assistant Managing Editor, U.S. News & World Report); Mike Flannery (Politics Correspondent, WBBM-TV); Lawrence J. Korb (Director, Center for Public Policy Education, Brookings Institution); Barbara Matusow (Senior Writer, Washingtonian Magazine); Jack Nelson (Chief Correspondent, Washington Bureau, Los Angeles Times)	"Ms. Matusow talked about current events in the news, including Secretary Brown’s scandal troubles, media coverage of Speaker Gingrich and President Clinton’s trip to Canada. In a live interview, Mr. Korb talked about the state of U.S. defense forces. In a live telephone interview, Mr. Duffy talked about his article about the Aldrich Ames spy scandal. In a taped interview Rep. DeLay talked evaluated progress on the Republican “Contract with America” during the first 50 days of the 104th Congress. In a live satellite interview, Mr. Flannery talked about the Chicago mayoral campaign."
Monday, February 27, 1995	3 hr. 7 min.	Bruce Collins; Connie Doebele	Eric Alterman (Washington Bureau Correspondent, Mother Jones); Andrew Ferguson (Senior Writer, Washingtonian Magazine); Rep. Nancy Johnson (R-CT); Jonathan S. Landay (National Security Correspondent, Christian Science Monitor); Steve Langdon (Correspondent, Congressional Quarterly); Sen. Paul S. Sarbanes (D-MD); Sen. Paul Simon (D-IL); David Skidmore (Correspondent, Associated Press)	"Mr. Langdon talked about the continuing debate in the Senate over the Balanced Budget Amendment. Via telephone, Mr. Skidmore talked about the Treasury Department budget. In the newspaper roundtable, Mr. Alterman and Mr. Ferguson discussed headlines from various papers across the country. In a point-counterpoint discussion, Senators Simon and Sarbanes discussed the Balanced Budget Amendment. Mr. Landay discussed the military base closings and realignments. Via telephone, Rep. Johnson talked about the IRS budget and tax fraud."
Tuesday, February 28, 1995	2 hr. 30 min.	Lew Ketcham	Michele Benecke (Representative, Service Members Legal Defense Network); James Brady (former White House Press Secretary); Sen. Kent Conrad (D-ND); Steven Komarow (Correspondent, USA Today); Robert Maginnis (Representative, Family Research Council); Bill McAllister (Correspondent, Washington Post Magazine); Tanya Metaksa (Executive Director, National Rifle Association Institute for Legislative Action); Federico Pena (Secretary, Department of Transportation); Jenny Ritter (President, College Democrats of America); Bill Spadea (President, College Republican National Committee)	"Mr. Kamarow talked about military base closings. Via telephone, Mr. McAllister talked about the Veterans Affairs Department budget. In the newspaper roundtable, Ms. Ritter and Mr. Spadea discussed headlines from various papers across the country. Mr. Brady talked about the effects of the Brady Handgun Control law, which was named after him. Mr. Pena talked about the opening of the Denver International Airport. Secretary Pena was mayor of Denver when this project began. In a point-counterpoint discussion, Ms. Benecke and Mr. Maginnis discussed gays and lesbians in the military. Via telephone, Ms. Metaksa talked about the effects of the Brady Handgun Control law. Via telephone, Senator Conrad talked about the Balanced Budget Amendment."
