= Uncial 0232 =

- New Testament manuscript
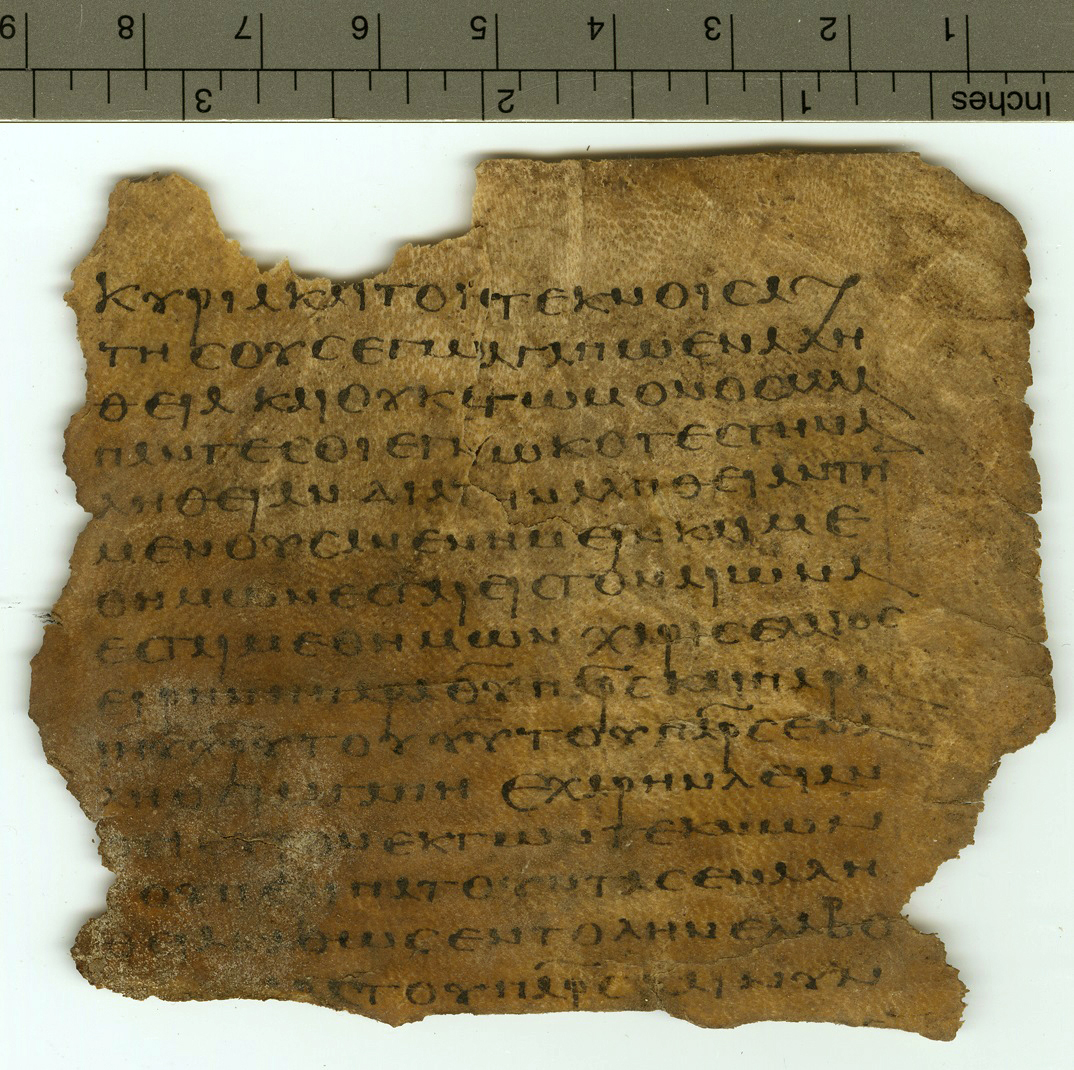
- Text: 2 John 1-9
- Date: 5th / 6th century
- Script: Greek
- Now at: Ashmolean Museum
- Size: 10 x 9 cm
- Type: Alexandrian text-type
- Category: II

Uncial 0232 (in the Gregory-Aland numbering), is a Greek uncial manuscript of the New Testament. The manuscript palaeographically has been assigned to the 5th or 6th century.

It contains most of the Second Epistle of John (verses 1-5 on the recto and 6-9 on the verso), on 1 parchment leaf (10 cm by 9 cm). The text is written in one column per page, 20 lines per page.

The Greek text of this codex is a representative of the Alexandrian text-type. Aland placed it in Category II.

Currently it is dated by the INTF to the 5th or 6th century.

Don Barker proposes a wider and earlier range of dates for Uncial 0232, along with Papyrus 39, Papyrus 88 and Uncial 0206; and states that all four could be dated as early as the late second century or as late as the end of the fourth century.

The manuscript was added to the list of the New Testament manuscripts by Kurt Aland in 1953.

The codex is housed at the Ashmolean Museum (P. Ant. 12), in Oxford.

== See also ==
- List of New Testament uncials
- Textual criticism
