= Vernon K. Robbins =

American New Testament scholar and historian

Vernon Kay Robbins
- Born: March 13, 1939 (age 87); Wahoo, Nebraska
- Known for: Markan scholarship
- Title: Winship Distinguished Research Professor of New Testament and Comparative Sacred Texts

Academic background
- Education: University of Chicago Divinity School

Vernon Kay Robbins (born March 13, 1939, in Wahoo, Nebraska) is an American New Testament scholar and historian of early Christianity. He is currently Winship Distinguished Research Professor of New Testament and Comparative Sacred Texts at Emory University, as well as visiting professor of New Testament at the University of Stellenbosch in South Africa. He is a major figure in Markan scholarship (scholarship related to the Gospel of Mark) and is the creator and a prominent proponent of socio-rhetorical criticism in New Testament studies.

Robbins obtained a B.A. from Westmar College, an M.Div. from United Theological Seminary and M.A. and Ph.D. degrees from the University of Chicago Divinity School. He taught at the University of Illinois at Urbana-Champaign before moving to Emory and in 1983-84 he was Fulbright Professor at the University of Trondheim.

In 1991, Robbins founded the monograph series Emory Studies in Early Christianity. Then in 2015, he launched the Rhetoric of Religious Antiquity series with the Society of Biblical Literature Press, which contains within it Sociorhetorical Exploration Commentaries.

In 2003, a festschrift was published in his honor, Fabrics of Discourse: Essays in Honor of Vernon K. Robbins, edited by David B. Gowler, L. Gregory Bloomquist, and Duane F. Watson (ISBN 1563383659). In 2014, Robbins was featured as one of the five pioneers of New Testament rhetorical criticism in Genealogies of New Testament Rhetorical Criticism, Fortress Press (ISBN 9780800699741)

== Works ==
- Robbins, Vernon K. (1984). Jesus the Teacher: A Socio-Rhetorical Interpretation of Mark. Philadelphia, PA: Fortress Press. ISBN 9780800607197. OCLC 9918718.
- ———; Mack, Burton L. (1989). Patterns of Persuasion in the Gospels. Sonoma, CA: Polebridge. ISBN 9780944344088. OCLC 19393083.
- ——— (1989). Ancient Quotes and Anecdotes: From Crib to Crypt. Sonoma, CA: Polebridge. ISBN 9780944344026. OCLC 17871751.
- ——— (1994). New Boundaries in Old Territory: Forms and Social Rhetoric in Mark. Emory studies in early Christianity. Vol. 3. New York: Peter Lang. ISBN 9780820419114. OCLC 28503116.
- ——— (1996). The Tapestry of Early Christian Discourse: Rhetoric, Society and Ideology. London & New York: Routledge. ISBN 9780415139977. OCLC 924617297.
- ——— (1996). Exploring the Texture of Texts: A Guide to Socio-Rhetorical Interpretation. Valley Forge, PA: Trinity Press International. ISBN 9781563381836. OCLC 35325390.
- ———; Lightstone, Jack N. (2006). Mishnah and the Social Formation of the Early Rabbinic Guild: a Socio-Rhetorical Approach. Waterloo: Wilfrid Laurier University Press. ISBN 9780889207295. OCLC 753479530.
- ——— (2009). Invention of Christian Discourse. Rhetoric of religious antiquity series. Vol. 1. Blandford Forum, UK: Deo Press. ISBN 9789058540218. OCLC 232128222.
- ——— (2010). Sea Voyages and Beyond: Emerging Strategies in Socio-Rhetorical Interpretation. Emory studies in early Christianity. Vol. 14. Blandford Forum, UK: Deo Press. ISBN 9781905679133. OCLC 666224068.
- ——— (2013). Who do People Say I Am?: Rewriting Gospel in Emerging Christianity. Grand Rapids, MI: Eerdmans. ISBN 9780802868398. OCLC 841201194.
- ——— (2015). Jesus and Mary: Reimagined in Early Christian Literature. Writings from the Greco-Roman world supplement series. Vol. 6. Atlanta, GA: SBL Press. ISBN 9781628370638. OCLC 908376672.
- ——— (2016). Foundations For Sociorhetorical Exploration: A Rhetoric of Religious Antiquity Reader. Vol. 4. Atlanta, GA: SBL Press. ISBN 9780884141686. OCLC 950902161.
- ——— (2017). The Art of Visual Exegesis: Rhetoric, Texts, Images. Emory studies in early Christianity. Vol. 19. Atlanta, GA: SBL Press. ISBN 9780884142133. OCLC 988084140.

== Festschrift ==
- Gowler, David B.; Bloomquist, L. Gregory; Watson, Duane F., eds. (2003). Fabrics of Discourse: Essays in Honor of Vernon K. Robbins. A&C Black. ISBN 1563383659.
