= Stefanie Minatee =

American singer-songwriter (born 1957)

Stefanie R. Minatee (born April 14, 1957) is an American singer-songwriter, recording artist, minister, and the founder and director of the Rev. Stef and Jubilation choir.

== Early life ==
Born April 14, 1957, in Newark, New Jersey, Stefanie Minatee is the eldest of three children of Pauline “Pearl” Tucker and Steven Emmanuel Minatee. A gospel singer, Pearl was a member of Savoy Records recording artists the Unique Gospel Singers and, starting in 1959, the Angelic Choir of the First Baptist Church of Nutley, New Jersey.

Minatee's father resided in Newark's Pennington Court projects and her mother resided on Thomas Street in the East Ward of Newark. The two married in 1953. In 1962, they moved to Edwin Place, becoming one of the first African American families to reside on that block. By then, the Minatees had shifted their church membership from Mt. Zion Baptist Church in Newark to First Baptist Church of Nutley, New Jersey, where the Reverend Lawrence Roberts was pastor and Pearl was a founding member of the Angelic Choir.

"I fell in love with gospel music at the First Baptist Church", Minatee told Tris McCall of the New Jersey Star-Ledger in 2013. "I spent a lot of time with Reverend Roberts. I'd hear him preach and play and sing. And it was amazing to see the procession of famous artists who would visit the church — everybody from Aretha Franklin to the Ward Singers to Billy Preston".

After graduating from Bragaw Avenue School in Newark in 1971, Minatee successfully auditioned for entrance to the Newark High School for the Arts (Arts High). While at Arts High (1971–75), she participated in gospel choir and women's ensemble.

Initially Minatee wanted to become a music teacher, but her parents did not believe that majoring in music was a practical career path. So she tried studying speech and hearing, but hated it. “When I had to take a course called ‘The Anatomy and Physiology of the Ear,’” Minatee related to McCall, “I said, ‘I can't do this,’ and I moseyed across the campus to the music department. I never looked back.”

She worked her way through college doing various jobs, including a toll booth collector and a United States Immigration officer. She obtained a Bachelor of Arts degree in music performance and a certificate in music education from Kean University in Union, New Jersey, in 1983.

Minatee has spent much of her professional career teaching vocal music at Plainfield High School and the Plainfield Academy for the Arts and Advanced Studies, both in Plainfield, New Jersey. As a vocal coach, composer and vocal arranger, she has authored and cataloged more than 100 songs.

== Religious ministry ==
Stefanie Minatee received the call to religious ministry and was licensed to preach on December 11, 1987, by Reverend Lawrence Roberts of First Baptist Church of Nutley, where she preached her first public sermon. She directed the church’s young adult choir during the 1980s and by the 1990s, assisted Rev. Roberts with the world-famous Angelic Choir.

Minatee was ordained on November 10, 2002, by the Reverend William C. Hall, the late Pastor of the New Light Baptist Church, Bloomfield, New Jersey. Since 2003, she has served as associate minister for the Community Baptist Church in Englewood, New Jersey. Returning to school, Minatee earned a Master's degree in Theological Studies from Drew University, Madison, New Jersey, in 2007, and a Doctorate of Ministry from the United Theological Seminary, Dayton, Ohio, in 2012.

== Rev. Stef and Jubilation ==
In 1998, Minatee was invited to form a community choir called Jubilation, at the request of New Jersey Performing Arts Center (NJPAC) CEO Larry Goldman and her maternal uncle, Donald Kofi Tucker, a civil rights champion and the longest-serving member of the Newark City Council. Among the members of Jubilation was Rita Owens, a friend of Minatee’s from First Baptist Church. Owens’ daughter, Dana, would later become known as the rapper, songwriter, singer, actress, and producer Queen Latifah.

Although the choir was formed to accompany gospel singer Shirley Caesar for a one-time NJPAC concert, the experience was so powerful that Jubilation became a permanent community choir, with Minatee as artistic director. By 1992, the group launched a touring choir called Voices of Jubilation, which traveled to Japan on its first tour. The year 1992 also saw the 120-voice Jubilation support Ray Charles on his first-ever holiday special, Ray Charles Celebrates a Gospel Christmas. The special was released on CD (Madacy Records) and on DVD in 1994. The same year, the choir toured with Charles and became an independent entity from the NJPAC.

Jubilation recorded its first full-length album, The Launch Out Project, in 2005. An introduction by a mutual friend to April Washington led to The Launch Out Project receiving a national rollout on Washington's Habakkuk Records in 2008. The album earned featured soloist Nancey Jackson Johnson a Stellar Award nomination in 2009 for Traditional Female Soloist of the Year.

Also in 2009, Minatee and Jubilation were tapped by Queen Latifah to provide her with assistance and vocal support on her contribution to the 2009 EMI Gospel various artist compilation Oh Happy Day: An All-Star Music Celebration. Together, they recorded the title track, which won Best Gospel Album at the 52nd Annual Grammy Awards.

Rev. Stef and Jubilation backed Queen Latifah again at Super Bowl 44 in Miami, Florida, and in April 2010 appeared on "Idol Gives Back" with famed guitarist Jeff Beck and singer Joss Stone.

The choir's next full-length release, 2011's independently released Just Like Sunday Morning, featured the singles “The Blood,” and the A. Jeffrey LaValley-penned “Still Standing.” Billboard-charting gospel artist Nancey Jackson-Johnson guest soloed on “He's Everything to Me.” Giving the album four of five stars, the Journal of Gospel Music said: “The CD highlights what Sunday Morning sounds like in the wooden churches on the hill, in the storefronts, and on the corner; and in the churches with stadium-like seating and foyers as big as a hotel’s.”

In 2013, the choir released A Jubilation Christmas, which included an energetic arrangement of “Hark the Herald Angels Sing” that was first recorded by the Reverend James Cleveland and the Angelic Choir of First Baptist Church in 1968.

Under the leadership of Minatee, Jubilation has worked with such popular music stars as Isaac Hayes, Dionne Warwick, Kenny Loggins, and Patty Griffin; as well as gospel legends Bishop Walter Hawkins, Albertina Walker, Kurt Carr, and Donnie McClurkin. They sang at the funeral of the band leader and vibraphone player Lionel Hampton.

== Illness and recovery ==
On April 9, 2015, Minatee suffered a debilitating stroke that did not affect her speech or consciousness, but did weaken her left side and restricted her mobility. During this period, Minatee self-published Prophetic Music Ministry, a book based on her doctoral education that combined her autobiography and philosophy of music ministry.

Minatee gained sufficient mobility by February 2018, to direct her musical survey, From The Middle Passage, an African-American Journey, at Community Baptist Church. Starring in the production were former Prince keyboardist Cassandra O’Neal, the teenage jazz singer Alexis Morrast, and Nancey Jackson Johnson. For Minatee, it was a grateful revisiting of a project she has produced off and on since 2002. She has since returned to directing Jubilation and preparing the choir for a 20th anniversary performance at NJPAC in June 2019, where it all began. In February 2020, during Black History Month, Minatee was honored for her community contributions by Governor Phil Murphy and the State of New Jersey. The ceremony was held in the Governor's Mansion in Princeton, New Jersey.

== Honors and recognition ==
Proclamation, Newark Mayor Cory Booker and the New Jersey State Assembly (2010)

Medal of Honor, City of Newark (2011)

Woman of Achievement, Center Jersey chapter of Delta Sigma Theta sorority (2011)

== Discography ==
Albums

Holy Spirit, Come on in the Room – Stefanie and Friends (Independent, 1997)

Spirit – NJPAC Jubilation Choir (Independent, 2004)

The Launch Out Project – (Independent, 2005; reissued on Habakkuk Music, 2008)

A Jubilation Christmas – Rev. Stef and Jubilation (Jubilation, Inc., 2013)

Just Like Sunday Morning – Rev. Stef and Jubilation (Jubilation, Inc., 2014)

Singles

“It's All About You,” 2019 (single and video)

Rev. Stef and Jubilation as Featured Artist

Ray Charles Celebrates a Gospel Christmas (Madacy, 2004)

“Oh Happy Day” with Queen Latifah on Oh Happy Day: An All-Star Music Celebration (EMI Gospel, 2009)
