= Lebanon Valley College =

Private college in Annville, Pennsylvania, US

- Motto: Libertas per Veritatem (The truth shall set you free)
- Type: Private university
- Established: February 23, 1866; 160 years ago
- Religious affiliation: United Methodist Church
- Endowment: $110.7 million (2025)
- President: James M. MacLaren
- Faculty: 122 full-time
- Administrative staff: 215
- Students: 1,915
- Undergraduates: 1,729
- Postgraduates: 186
- Location: Annville, Pennsylvania, United States; 40°19′57″N 76°30′54″W
- Campus: Rural on 340 acres (1.48 km^{2})
- Colors: Blue and white
- Nickname: Flying Dutchmen
- Mascot: Flying Dutchman
- Website: lvc.edu

Lebanon Valley College (LVC, Lebanon Valley, or The Valley) is a private university in Annville, Pennsylvania.

== History ==
Lebanon Valley College was founded on February 23, 1866, with classes beginning May 7 of that year and its first class graduating in 1870. Expenses at this time for a full year were $206.50 (equal to approximately $5,260 in 2025) and remained relatively unchanged for the next 50 years.

=== Early history (1866–1897) ===
The college was founded by and initially associated with the Church of the United Brethren in Christ. Today, Lebanon Valley College is affiliated with the United Methodist Church, which occurred through a series of church mergers: The Church of the United Brethren in Christ merged with the Evangelical Association in 1946 creating the Evangelical United Brethren Church (EUB), which subsequently merged with the Methodist Church in 1968 to create the United Methodist Church. The ties to the Methodist Church are not as strong as they once were, which is evidenced by the lack of mandatory chapel services, but the church maintains a presence on the campus. Out of 34 colleges and academies founded by the United Brethren in Christ Church, Lebanon Valley was one of four to survive.

The campus began as a single building, the empty Annville Academy building, which was purchased for $4,500 (equal to $100,000 in 2025) by five Annville citizens. They presented the building as a gift to the East Pennsylvania Conference of the United Brethren Church to settle the argument over where to establish the college. In a little more than two months from its founding, 12 trustees were appointed, President Thomas R. Vickroy was elected, the building was repaired and redecorated, a curriculum was devised, faculty recruited, and classes began. The college was entirely contained in that one building (class rooms, student residence, president's residence, and "dining hall") until 1868, when "North College" was opened at a cost of $31,500, equal to $760,000 in 2025. The Annville Academy building became known as "South Hall" or "Ladies Hall" as the North College building was now the home to the men's dormitories.

The college charter, granted in 1867, specifically stated that Lebanon Valley College was established for the education of both sexes, so Lebanon Valley College can claim that it has been coeducational longer than any other college east of the Allegheny Mountains. However, the curricula were different for men and women, a condition created from a compromise after an uproar in the founding church over the equal treatment of men and women. The "Ladies Course" included modern languages, painting, drawing, wax flower and fruit making, and music. By 1878, the college catalog began announcing that experience showed that there was no difference between men and women in their ability to master college courses, an unpopular idea at its time.

This was also the time of the founding literary societies: Philokosmian, Clionian, and Kalozetean, which bear no resemblance to their present fraternity and sorority selves. They met regularly to debate topics and discuss essays. Other activities included mixed socials, parades, the annual Chestnut Picnic, and other special events throughout the years.

=== Growth (1897–1948) ===
The college steadily grew during its first 35 years, and by 1904, the campus had expanded to include Engle Hall, home of the music department, and a partially completed library funded by Andrew Carnegie. On Christmas Eve 1904, North College (not to be confused with the residence hall with the same name), which stood in the current footprint of the Administration/Humanities building, burned down. The next year, the college raised funds to rebuild and also began expanding the campus further, building not only a new Administration Building (the current Humanities Building), but also North Hall (a women's dorm, currently the site of Miller Chapel), Kreider Hall (a men's residence hall where the current Neidig-Garber Science Center is located), the central heating plant (still in existence), a science building, and a gymnasium. However, funding ran out, debt rose, and building halted on the gym and science buildings. President Hervin U. Roop resigned in disgrace on New Year's Day, 1906. It was not until President Lawrence W. Keister took office on June 12, 1907, that the debt situation was solved. Thanks to his fundraising efforts, the debt was eliminated by 1911. The college landscape remained relatively unchanged for the next four decades, under the leadership of President George D. Gossard (1912–1932) and Clyde A. Lynch (1932–1950).

Cultural changes at LVC paralleled those in the rest of the country, moving through World War I, the Roaring Twenties, the Great Depression, and the New Deal.

=== Mid-century and modern day (1948–present) ===
World War II nearly proved to be the end of Lebanon Valley College. In the fall of 1942, LVC's first wartime registration showed only 357 students enrolled. As the second semester began in 1943, there were only 282 students: 145 women and 137 men, the first time that women outnumbered men. 1943 Fall enrollment dropped again to only 199 students, 62 of which were on limited deferment, waiting to be called to active duty. This prompted one of the first capital campaigns to help the ailing college. The campaign to raise $550,000 received 91% support from current students. The money was to go toward an endowment and a real gymnasium, which bore the name of the president who initiated the campaign—Clyde A. Lynch Memorial Hall. Right before the war ended, LVC enrollment hit bottom at 192 students. In 1946, however, enrollment ballooned to 683 students, more than 300 of which were ex-servicemen.

Enrollment steadily grew and by 1948, thanks to the G.I. Bill, it had reached 817 full-time students, far beyond the college's capacity. Eventually, additional facilities and residences were added to the college. Clyde A. Lynch Memorial Hall—which included the school's first proper gymnasium—was opened in 1953. In 1957, Science Hall (now the Derickson A apartments) was created out of the old Kreider Factory building on White Oak St., and Gossard Library also opened that year. In 1966, Frederic K. Miller Chapel was completed. The 1950s also saw the college expand north of Sheridan Avenue, with the Dining Hall (now Lehr and Phillips Dining Hall) built in 1958. Other current traditional residence halls were built between the 1950s and 1970s as well—Mary Green (1956) and Vickroy (1960) in the 1950s-60s, Hammond and Keister Hall in 1965, and Funkhouser and Silver in the 1970s. Marquette and Dellinger were added in 1999 and 2002, respectively, and Stanson was added in 2009.

Enrollment also grew, although it had stagnated by the 1980s. A turnaround began under the presidency of Arthur L. Peterson, whose tenure in office was cut short due to health issues. Soon thereafter, a highly energetic president, John Synodinos, ushered in a period of growth and change with the bold introduction of merit scholarships and the renovation and beautification of a substantial portion of the campus that included the addition of the Edward H. Arnold Sports Center and the Suzanne H. Arnold Art Gallery and Zimmerman Recital hall. With the assistance of William J. McGill, senior vice president and the dean of the faculty, academic excellence continued to be emphasized, linkages were established with other institutions and schools, an international initiative undertaken, and collaborative learning experiences developed. A new technologically advanced library, the Vernon and Doris Bishop Library, opened in January 1996.

Beginning in 1996 and building on the work of his predecessor, G. David Pollick's eight-year presidency ushered in a period of continued growth. There was a 40 percent increase in undergraduate enrollment with applications more than doubling. New undergraduate and graduate degree programs were added and there was a large increase in the number of first-year students who studied abroad. A major public relations focus to enhance the college's standing among peer institutions was followed by a major rebuilding and renovation effort on campus and the start of a $50 million campaign, Great Expectations. Pollick oversaw a growth plan that added athletic teams, more than a dozen new campus buildings and athletic facilities, and the college's signature Fasick Bridge. These additions almost tripled the usable space of the college, including five new facilities: the Marquette and Dellinger Residence Halls, the Allan W. Mund College Center, Sorrentino Gymnasium, and the Heilman Center. A revitalization of Clyde A. Lynch Memorial Hall and the Neidig-Garber Science Center also were begun during this period.

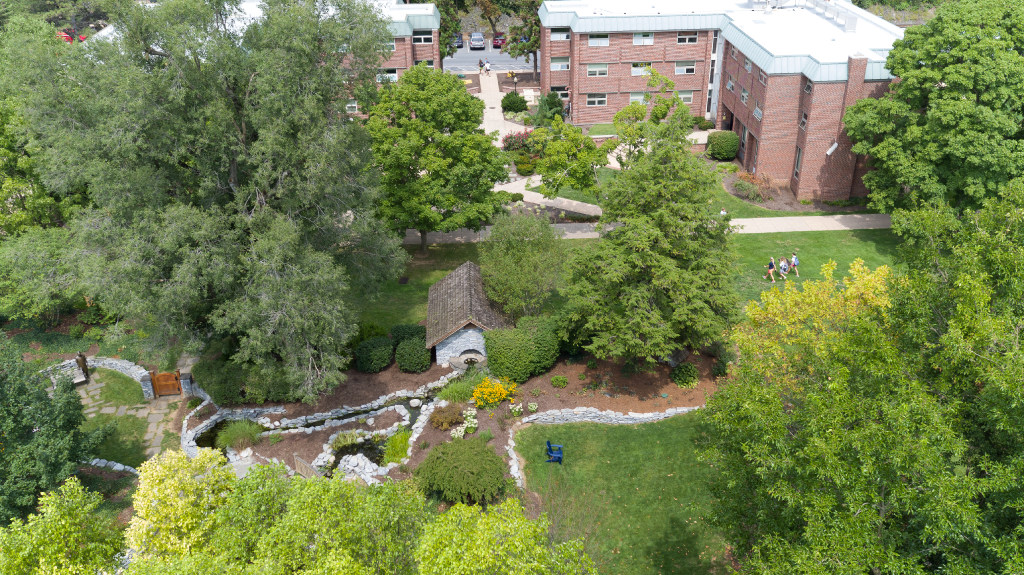
An aerial view of LVC's Peace Garden, taken by Blue Fuego. The Peace Garden is in the middle of the college's Residential Quad and is a popular place to study, relax, or take milestone photographs, especially weddings.

Today, the campus consists of 40 buildings, including the recently renovated Clyde A. Lynch Memorial Hall, the Vernon and Doris Bishop Library (revitalized in 2016), the Heilman Center for communication sciences & disorders/speech-language pathology, and $20 million Jeanne and Edward H. Arnold Health Professions Pavilion (opened August 2018) for athletic training, exercise science, and physical therapy. Students received career advice from experts in the Edward and Lynn Breen Center for Graduate Success (launched programming in 2018) and study under the college's new general education curriculum, Constellation LVC (started in fall 2016). Students reside in one of 25 residence halls that include traditional single-sex and co-educational dormitories and apartment-style residences. Students may also reside in special interest houses upon proposal and approval of LVC administration. A small number of upperclassmen are allowed to live off-campus, and a significant portion of the student body are commuter students. Undergraduate enrollment is now over 1,900 students.

The endowment of the institution is more than seventy-five million dollars (2023).

=== Lost lore and current traditions ===
==== May Day ====
A festive tradition, this pageant was begun in 1912. Each year, a May Queen would be elected and would watch over the festival with her court. Typical May Day activities took place, including the expected May pole. This tradition persisted for 55 years until the late 1960s.

==== Formal dances ====
Until October 1931, dancing on the LVC campus was forbidden. One evening after a football game, President Gossard decided to change the policy and allowed the students to dance with his blessing. From then on, the literary societies began holding annual dinner dances. Formal proms were organized and any opportunity for dancing was not overlooked.

In February 1985, the institution opened a nighttime dance club called the Underground (or "UG" as it is referred to by most students). The UG is a place where students can go to have fun with their classmates and friends on most Saturday nights. The UG plays popular hits from today's music and is open to non-LVC students at a small price. Today the dance club part of the Underground no longer exists and is mainly used by the institution for events.

==== March to the President's House ====
In a tradition that dates to the presidency of Clyde A. Lynch, class of 1918 (1932–1950), students march to the president's home, Kreiderheim since 1976, to request the day off before Thanksgiving when the football team defeats Albright College. LVC defeated Albright in double overtime in 2018 and President Thayne granted the students' wish.

=== Presidents ===
Former presidents of LVC include:

1. Thomas Rhys Vickroy, 1866–1871
2. Lucian H. Hammond, 1871–1876
3. David D. DeLong, 1876–1887
4. Edmund S. Lorenz, 1887–1889
5. Cyrus J. Kephart, 1889–1890
6. E. Benjamin Bierman, 1890–1897
7. Hervin U. Roop, 1897–1906
8. Abram Paul Funkhouser, 1906–1907
9. Lawrence Keister, 1907–1912
10. George Daniel Gossard, 1912–1932
11. Clyde Alvin Lynch, 1932–1950
12. Frederick K. Miller, 1951–1967 (Allan W. Mund acting president, 1967–1968)
13. Frederick P. Sample, 1968–1983 (F. Allen Rutherford Jr. acting president, 1984)
14. Arthur L. Peterson, 1984–1987 (William J. McGill acting president, 1987–1988)
15. John A. Synodinos, 1988–1996
16. G. David Pollick, 1996–2004
17. Stephen C. MacDonald, 2004–2012
18. Lewis Evitts Thayne, August 1, 2012 – June 30, 2020
19. James M. MacLaren, July 1, 2020–Present

== Academics ==
LVC offers more than 45 undergraduate majors, 11 graduate programs, and 10 graduate certificate programs. Students can also study abroad for a semester in England, Germany, Ireland, Italy, New Zealand, Northern Ireland, and Spain; or pursue a short-term program in Canada, Costa Rica, Germany, Italy, the Netherlands, Poland, and Spain, with new options for Northern Ireland and Scotland in summer 2024. The institution also offers domestic programs in Boston and Washington, D.C.

== Athletics ==
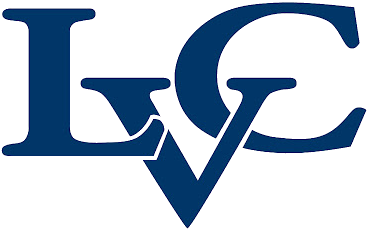
Lebanon athletics mark

Lebanon Valley College is a member of NCAA Division III, competing in the MAC Freedom. LVC offers 26 intercollegiate sports, including Pennsylvania's first varsity eSports program, which competes in the National Association of Collegiate Esports. The athletic program began in 1893 with baseball and then football in 1897. Men's and women's basketball were introduced in 1904. LVC's teams are called the Flying Dutchmen, and its mascot is the Dutchman.

=== Men's teams ===
- Baseball
  - Established 1893.
  - 2002, 2022, 2023 Commonwealth Conference Champion and Coach Jonas Fester named MAC Commonwealth Coach of the Year, 2022 and 2023.
  - 2023 NCAA Division III Regional Finalists
  - Plays at McGill Field
- Basketball
  - Established in 1904.
  - 1994 NCAA Division III National Champions
  - The 1952–53 team reached the NCAA Sweet 16, and is the smallest school in enrollment (425 students) to advance that far.
  - Plays at the Louis A. Sorrentino Gymnasium
- Cross Country
  - Competes at Union Canal Tunnel Park in Lebanon.
- Football
  - Established in 1897
  - 2009 and 2011 ECAC Southwest Bowl champions
  - Has produced 11 all-Americans
  - Plays at Henry and Gladys Arnold Field.
  - co-champions with Lycoming in 2013 for MAC Division III
  - First NCAA Division III football appearance in school history
  - Wittenberg University (OH) beat LVC in first round of tournament
  - Played its first game under lights.
  - Current coach is former LVC football star Greg Drake
- Golf
  - Began play in 1965
  - Hosts tournaments at Lebanon Country Club.
- Ice Hockey
  - Began play in 1998
  - Plays home games at Hersheypark Arena and the Giant Center in Hershey, Pa.
- Lacrosse
  - Originally sponsored from 1965 to 1985, re-established in 2010
  - Plays at Arnold Field
- Soccer
  - Established in 1973
  - Plays home games at Herbert Field
- Swimming
  - Established in 1988
  - Competes at the Arnold Sports Center
- Tennis
  - Was played as early as 1915 and has been sponsored several times since then, regaining varsity status for good in 1992
  - Won eight Commonwealth Conference titles since re-establishing, including in 2022 and 2023, and competed in 2022 and 2023 NCAA Division III National Championships.
- Track & Field (indoor and outdoor)
  - Established in 1913
  - Has produced eight All-Americans
  - Competes at the Arnold Sports Center (indoors) and Arnold Field (outdoors).

=== Women's teams ===
- Basketball
  - Established in 1904
  - Has won three straight Commonwealth Conference champions (2011, 2012, 2013)
  - Advanced to the NCAA Elite Eight in 2011 and NCAA Sweet 16 in 2012
  - Plays at the Sorrentino Gymnasium
- Cross Country
  - Had its first MAC Champion in 2012 with freshman Kelsey Patrick.
  - Competes at Union Canal Tunnel Park in Lebanon.
- Field Hockey
  - Established in 1933
  - Four NCAA Division III Final Four appearances (1996, 1997, 2006, 2007) with 16 NCAA appearances
  - Former player Jocelyn Novak is the all-time NCAA Division III leader in goals and points
  - Six-time MAC/Commonwealth Conference champion, most recently in 2006
  - 45 All-Americans since 1987
  - Plays at Arnold Field.
  - Current coach is alum Amber Corcoran ('09)
- Golf
  - Began play in 2013
  - Hosts tournaments at Lebanon Country Club.
- Ice Hockey
  - Began play in 2016
  - NCAA Division III All-Time Leader for Saves in a Season and Career, Jill Moffatt '20
- Lacrosse
  - 2013 ECAC Mid-Atlantic Champion
  - Originally sponsored from 1975 to 1985, re-established in 2010
  - Plays at Arnold Field
- Soccer
  - Established in 1996
  - Plays home games at Herbert Field
- Softball
  - Established in 1984
  - 2008, 2013, 2014, and 2015 Commonwealth Conference Champions
  - NCAA Tournament appearances in 2008, 2010, 2013, 2014, 2015, and 2023
  - Advanced to the NCAA Regional Championship game in 2013 and NCAA Super Regional in 2023
  - NCAA Division All-Time leader for consecutive stolen bases (97), Sammy Bost '17, D'19
  - Coach Scot Adams named MAC Commonwealth Coach of the Year, 2022 and 2023
  - Plays at the LVC Softball Park
- Swimming
  - Established in 1989
  - Competes at the Arnold Sports Center
- Tennis
  - Began in 1994
  - 2009, 2022, and 2023 MAC Commonwealth Conference champions.
  - Won first NCAA Division III Tournament match in 2023
  - Coach Jeff Robins named MAC Commonwealth Coach of the Year
- Track & Field (indoor and outdoor)
  - Began in 1986
  - Won the 2012 and 2013 Middle Atlantic Conference indoor championships
  - Has produced nine all-Americans
- Volleyball
  - Won four straight Commonwealth Titles from 2008 to 2011.
  - Four consecutive NCAA Division III Tournament appearances from 2008 to 2011.
  - Plays at the LVC Gymnasium

=== Co-ed teams ===
- Esports
  - Began in December 2017
  - Compete in Call of Duty (Vanguard), Counter Strike, Fighting Games, Halo (Infinite), Hearth Stone, League of Legends, Overwatch, Rainbow Six (Siege), Rocket League, Smite, Super Smash Bros (Ultimate), and Valorant
  - Won NECC Challengers Division National Championship (Rainbow Six) in 2023

== Residential life ==
Lebanon Valley College has several buildings in which students reside. These buildings include Mary Green, Keister, Hammond, Funkhouser, Silver, Stanson, and Vickroy. In addition to those seven traditional dorms, Marquette, Dellinger, Stanson, and Derickson A/B provide apartment style living for upperclassman students on campus. All dorms include co-ed living among the floors. Residential Assistants are assigned to each building to enforce rules and organize activities for the students.

== Notable alumni ==
- Marylouise Burke (Class of 1962)—American actress who appeared in the films Sideways and Wild Canaries, on Broadway in Inherit the Wind and Into the Woods, and off-Broadway in Fuddy Meers (winner of the Drama Desk Award for Featured Actress in a Play) and in Kimberly Akimbo (nominee for Drama Desk Award for Outstanding Actress in a Play); and 2014 Obie Award honoree for sustained excellence and performance.
- Mark B. Cohen (Master of Business Administration, Class of 2000)—Judge of the Philadelphia Court of Common Pleas, former member of the Pennsylvania House of Representatives.
- Tom Corbett (Class of 1971)—46th governor of Pennsylvania, 2011–2015: Pennsylvania Attorney General, 1995–1997, and 2005–2011.
- Bryan Cutler (Class of 2001)—former Speaker of the Pennsylvania House of Representatives, current minority leader for the Pennsylvania House of Representatives; member of the House since being elected in 2006.
- Reuben Ewing (born Reuben Cohen), Major League Baseball player
- Giovanni Ferrero— Italian billionaire businessman and CEO of the confectionery company Ferrero SpA.
- Daniel Fox (Class of 1948)—Credited with inventing LEXAN polycarbonate, which is used in CDs, DVDs, car bumpers, and Nalgene products.
- Charlie Gelbert (Class of 1928)—former Major League Baseball player who played primarily at shortstop for the St. Louis Cardinals, Cincinnati Reds, Detroit Tigers, Washington Senators, and Boston Red Sox.
- Carolyn Gillette (Class of 1982)—Renowned composer whose hymns have been sung by congregations nationally and internationally; her hymns cover national tragedies such a 9/11 and have been performed nationally on PBS–TV and internationally on BBC–TV.
- Hinkey Haines (Class of 1919, transferred to Penn State University)—former Major League Baseball outfielder for the New York Yankees, playing only in the 1923 season.
- Ned D. Heindel (Class of 1959)—former president, American Chemical Society; cancer, nuclear medicine, and therapeutic drug researcher with 14 patents and more than 260 publications.
- Henry "Two Bits" Homan (Class of 1924)— former NFL quarterback who played with the Frankford Yellow Jackets in Philadelphia from 1925 until 1930, and team member of the 1926 NFL champions.
- F. Obai Kabia (Class of 1973, Honorary Doctorate, 2018)—former representative to the Permanent Mission of the Republic of Sierra Leone, Third and First Secretary to the United Nations (UN); also worked with the UN Secretariat through the Office of the UN Commissioner for Namibia, the Office of the UN Secretary General (UNSG), and the UN Department of Peacekeeping Operations.
- Horace Kephart (Class of 1879, 1882)—Outdoorsman, travel writer, and author named a father of the Great Smoky Mountain National Park; co-plotter of the Appalachian Trail through the Smoky Mountains; Mount Kephart named in his honor; featured in a Ken Burns series.
- Paul K. Keene (Class of 1932)—founder and owner of Walnut Acres; considered a pioneer of the organic farming movement in the U.S.
- Malcolm L. Lazin (Class of 1965)—Founder and executive director, Equality Forum; former Assistant United States Attorney for the Easter District of Pennsylvania [1970–1974].
- Roy Lechthaler—National Football League player who played with the Philadelphia Eagles.
- Walt Levinsky (Class of 1951)—Jazz clarinetist and lead alto sax player who performed with the Tommy Dorsey, Benny Goodman, and Artie Shaw orchestras, Frank Sinatra, Lena Horne, and many others.
- Dale Miller (academic) (class of 1978)-Director of Research at Inria Saclay and one of the designers of the λProlog programming language and the Abella theorem prover.
- Clyde A. Lynch (Class of 1914), pastor and president of Lebanon Valley College 1932–1950
- Edward C. Malesic — current Catholic Bishop of Cleveland
- Bruce Metzger (Class of 1935)—Princeton Theological Seminary professor, author, and theological scholar.
- Gary Miller (Class of 1968)—Conductor and gay activist l co-founder and director [1980–1998] of the New York City Gay Men's Chorus, which performed more than 50 concerts in Carnegie Hall.
- Peter George Olenchuk, M.D. (Class of 1942)—U.S. Army Major General; assistant deputy chief of staff for research, development, and acquisition.
- Andrew "Andy" Panko (Class of 1999)—Professional basketball player; made his National Basketball Association debut with the Atlanta Hawks in 2001; was named the Spanish ACB League MVP in 2012, while playing with San Sebastián Gipuzkoa.
- Mike Rhoades (Class of 1995)—Head men's basketball coach, Pennsylvania State University; led Lebanon Valley College men's basketball team to 1994 NCAA Division III National Championship.
- John Sant'Ambrogio (Class of 1954)—Principal cellist with the Saint Louis Symphony Orchestra [1968–2005]; founder and artistic director, the Arts for the Soul summer vacation retreat in Steamboat Springs, Colorado.
- Charles F. Schmidt, M.D., (Class of 1914)—Scientist and University of Pennsylvania Medical School chair who, along with K.K. Chen of China, re-discovered ephedrine and introduced it to the Western world; considered by many to be a father of pharmacology who also studied morphine; researched aviation and space medicine working with U.S. astronauts John Glenn and Neil Armstrong as research director of the Naval Air Development Center.
- Paul E. V. Shannon (Class of 1918)—former Bishop of the Evangelical United Brethren Church, elected in 1957.
- Lloyd Smucker—Republican member of the U.S. House of Representatives for Pennsylvania's 16th congressional district; former member of the Pennsylvania State Senate.
- W. Maynard Sparks (Class of 1927)—former Bishop of the Evangelical United Brethren Church, elected in 1958.
- Frank Tulli (Class of 1966)—former Republican representative for the 106th district in the Pennsylvania House of Representatives.
