= Charlene P. Kammerer =

American Methodist bishop

Charlene P. Kammerer is an American bishop in The United Methodist Church, elected and consecrated to the Episcopacy in 1996.

Born January 5, 1948, Kammerer graduated from Wesleyan College in 1970. She received a Master of Christian Education and Master of Divinity from Garrett-Evangelical Theological Seminary. She received a Doctor of Ministry from United Theological Seminary in 1991.

Kammerer is married to Leigh Kammerer. They have one son, Chris.

== Ordained ministry ==
- Ordained Deacon, Florida Conference, 1975
- Ordained Elder, Florida Conference, 1977
- Campus Minister, Duke University
- District Superintendent, Tallahassee District, Florida Conference
- Bishop, Western North Carolina Conference, 1996
- Bishop, Virginia Annual Conference, 2004

== See also ==
- List of bishops of the United Methodist Church
