= Otis Moss Jr. =

African-American pastor (1935-)

Otis Moss Jr. (born February 26, 1935) is an American pastor, theologian, speaker, author, and activist. Moss is well known for his involvement in the Civil Rights Movement and his friendship with both Martin Luther King Jr. and Martin Luther King Sr. He is also the father of Otis Moss III, the current pastor of Trinity United Church of Christ in Chicago.

== Early life and education ==
Moss, who is of African American heritage, was born in and raised in LaGrange, Georgia, the fourth of five children. After being orphaned at 16 he earned his B.A. at Morehouse College in 1956, before earning his Master of Divinity from the Morehouse School of Religion in 1959. At Morehouse, Moss was taught and mentored by Benjamin Mays, who was also a mentor to Martin Luther King Jr. While at Morehouse, Moss helped lead sit-ins for The Atlanta Student Movement and other activities to protest segregation. He completed further graduate coursework at the Interdenominational Theological Center from 1960 to 1961. He also earned a Doctor of Ministry from United Theological Seminary in 1990, where he was taught there by Samuel DeWitt Proctor and became friends with Jeremiah Wright, pastor of the famous Trinity United Church of Christ in Chicago and pastor of Barack Obama. Moss's son, Otis Moss III, would later take over as senior pastor for Wright after he was caught up in a controversy during the 2008 presidential election over the content of sermons he gave during the time in which Barack Obama attended the church.

== Career and ministry ==
Moss became the pastor of Mount Olive Baptist Church in LaGrange in 1954, pastoring the church until 1961. From 1956 to 1959 he simultaneously served as the senior pastor at both Mount Olive and Providence Baptist Church in Atlanta. He then moved to pastor Mount Zion Baptist Church in Lockland, Ohio from 1961 to 1975. While at the church he was regional director of Martin Luther King Jr.'s Southern Christian Leadership Conference, leading several campaigns to fight various forms of discrimination and segregation. He also participated in the Selma, Alabama civil rights march with King, whom he became close friends with. King also married Moss and his wife. In 1971 he spent one year away from the church to co-pastor Ebenezer Baptist Church in Atlanta with Martin Luther King Sr. After leaving Mount Zion Baptist Church in 1975 he left to pastor the Olivet Institutional Baptist Church in Cleveland, which was then the largest black church in the state of Ohio. He led the church for 33 years before retiring in 2008. During his time at the church, besides continuing to be a sought-after speaker and influential figure in social justice movements, he was an advisor to President Jimmy Carter and also befriended such figures as Bill Clinton, Barack Obama, Oprah Winfrey, and Jesse Jackson. In 1997 Moss partnered with University Hospitals to create the Otis Moss Jr. Medical Center. He was also repeatedly named one of American's most influential black preachers by Ebony Magazine.

== Honors and awards ==
Moss has received dozens of honors and awards. He has received the Candle in Religion Award from Morehouse College, the Role of Model of the Year Award from the National Institute for Responsible Fatherhood and Family development, a Leadership Award from the American Jewish Committee, the Human Relations Award from Bethune-Cookman University, and a Lifetime Achievement Award from the Cleveland Clinic.

== Lectures ==
Moss has long-been a sought-after speaker, lecturing at hundreds of colleges and churches throughout the world, including at the Oxford Roundtable at Oxford University and in the Lyman Beecher Lecture Series at Yale University, and the National Cathedral in Washington D.C. He has also spoken in Hong Kong, Taiwan, Japan, Jordan, Israel, and South Africa.

== Personal life ==
Moss has been married to his wife, Edwina, for over fifty years and has three children, Kevin, Daphne (deceased), and Otis III.
