= Patrick Matolengwe =

South African Anglican bishop (1937–2019)

- Born: Monwabisi Patrick Matolengwe; 12 May 1937; Graaff-Reinet, Eastern Cape, South Africa
- Died: 31 May 2019 (aged 82); Johannesburg, South Africa
- Education: Teachers' College at Lovedale; Nashotah House; United Theological Seminary
- Occupations: Bishop, teacher

Monwabisi Patrick Matolengwe (12 May 1937 – 31 May 2019) was a South African Anglican bishop.

== Biography ==
Matolengwe was born in Graaff-Reinet in the Eastern Cape. He qualified as a teacher at the Teachers’ College at Lovedale, he taught for a few years, after which he worked as a court interpreter in Laaiplek in the Western Cape. While at Laaiplek he became involved in Christian youth education and decided to change his career and trained for the Anglican ministry.

After graduation in 1966, he worked at Nyanga, Cape Town and in the surrounding rural areas. In recognition of his ministry he was made a canon of St. George's Cathedral, Cape Town, he was subsequently elected to be a suffragan bishop of the diocese of Cape Town.

The political and social pressures of life in the Apartheid-era South Africa in the 1970s and 80s took their toll on his health. In 1988, he was invited by the bishop of Milwaukee to move to the United States. He was appointed dean of All Saints Cathedral, Milwaukee and assisting bishop in the diocese of Milwaukee. He studied theology at Nashotah House and at the United Theological Seminary, Dayton, Ohio, where he received a master's degree in Theological Studies degree and doctoral degree in ministry. In recognition of his work in the diocese, Nashotah House conferred on him an honorary Doctor of Divinity degree.

He returned to South Africa in 1998 and worked with the South African Council of Churches. In retirement, he worked in the Anglican parish in Graaff-Reinet in the Diocese of George. In 2011 the bishop of Kimberley and Kuruman invited him to be an assisting bishop in the western part of that diocese. On completion of that assignment he returned to Johannesburg to assist at the parish of Christ the King in Sophiatown.

Matolengwe died on 31 May 2019 in the Helen Joseph Hospital, Johannesburg.
