= Emerson Stephen Colaw =

American Methodist bishop and theologian

Emerson Stephen Colaw (November 13, 1921 – October 11, 2016) was an American bishop in the United Methodist Church and theologian specializing in homiletics. He was first elected as bishop in 1980.

== Education ==
Colaw earned a B.S. degree in 1944 from the University of Cincinnati and a Bachelor of Divinity degree, magna cum laude, in 1947 from Drew Theological Seminary. He received a Master of Arts degree from Northwestern University in Evanston, Illinois, in 1953. He did graduate work at Union Theological Seminary in New York City and the Lutheran School of Theology in Chicago. He received honorary doctorates from five different institutions.

== Ordained ministry ==
He was ordained a deacon in 1945 by Bishop H. Lester Smith, and an elder in 1947 by Bishop G. Bromley Oxnam. Rev. Colaw became a member in full connection with the New York state annual conference of the Methodist Church in 1947. That fall, however, he transferred to the Northern Illinois annual conference, where he served three different pastorates over 14 years. In 1961, Colaw was appointed to the Hyde Park Community United Methodist Church in Cincinnati, Ohio (West Ohio annual conference). It was from this appointment that he was elected to the episcopacy by the North Central jurisdictional conference of the United Methodist Church]in July 1980.

Colaw was a jurisdictional and general conference delegate from 1968 to 1980. He also was a member of the General Conference Commission on Doctrine and Doctrinal Standards.

== Episcopal ministry ==
Colaw was elected to the episcopacy by the 1980 North Central Jurisdictional Conference of the church. As a bishop he was on the General Board of Discipleship, the General Council on Finance and Administration, the General Board of Higher Education and Ministry and was chairperson of the Commission to Study the Mission of the Church during the 1984-88 quadrennium.

== Other ==
Colaw received numerous ecumenical awards. He retired in 1988 and then became a professor of homiletics and Christian ministry at United Theological Seminary in Dayton, Ohio from 1988 to 1999. He was the acting president of the seminary from 1995 to1996. After his second retirement, he became bishop in residence at the North Naples United Methodist Church in Naples, Florida, during winters. He relaxed with golf and reading and, for many years, was active in Rotary International. In Cincinnati, Colaw spent many years as moderator of a weekly television program titled Dialogue which had an ecumenical panel of local Protestant, Catholic and Jewish clergy.

He wrote many books and pamphlets and more than 40 magazine articles.

== Birth and family ==
Colaw was born in Chanute, Kansas. He married Jane Elizabeth Curry of East McKeesport, Pennsylvania, on August 26, 1942. They have four children: Prudence, Deborah, Marcella, and David. His wife, Jane, died on April 16, 2013, in Cincinnati, Ohio. Colaw died on October 11, 2016, in Cincinnati.

Their daughter Prudence Klinger (Larry) has three children, Jeffrey, Robert (died October 11, 2010) and Kristin.

Their daughter Deborah Peterson has one son, Andrew Peterson.

Their daughter Marcella Vilardo (Michael) has three children, Christopher, Laura and David.

His son David (Jill Compston) has two children, Joshua and Rachael.

In 2021, there were 13 great-grandchildren and two great-great-grandchildren.

== See also ==
- List of bishops of the United Methodist Church
