= Uncial 0206 =

- New Testament manuscript
- MOTB
- Name: P. Oxy. 1353
- Text: 1 Peter 5:5-13
- Date: 4th century
- Script: Greek
- Found: Oxyrhynchus, Egypt
- Now at: United Theological Seminary
- Cite: B. P. Grenfell & A. S. Hunt, OP XI (1915), pp. 5-6.
- Size: 14 x 10 cm
- Type: mixed
- Category: III

Uncial 0206 (in the Gregory-Aland numbering of New Testament manuscripts), is a Greek uncial manuscript of the New Testament. Using the study of comparative writing styles (palaeography), it has been dated to the 4th century.

== Description ==
The surviving leaf contains most of First Epistle of Peter 5:5-13, on three discontinuous parchment fragments (page size 14 cm by 10 cm). The text is written in one column per page, with only 8 lines per page, in large monumental uncial letters. It originally formed part of a deluxe manuscript book collecting an extensive corpus of Christian texts. The handwriting resembles Codex Sinaiticus.

Papyrologist Don Barker notes a page number added to the head of the verso (reverse side) had been misread by papyrologist Bernard Grenfell, the original editor, as 229 (represented by Greek letters σκθ functioning as numerals), but is in fact 829 (or possibly 819; represented by Greek letters ωκθ or ωιθ - the middle letter is unclear). This demonstrates the copyist had already filled over 800 pages of text before reaching the First Epistle of Peter. Even allowing for the exceptionally large scale of the writing, and the relatively small parchment pages, this would imply the original codex must have contained a very substantial corpus of Christian writings; and would, for example, have been consistent with it containing the entirety of the eventual canon of Pauline and Catholic epistles.

== Text ==
The Greek text of this codex is representative of the Alexandrian text-type. The text-types are groups of different New Testament manuscripts which share specific or generally related readings, which then differ from each other group, and thus the conflicting readings can separate out the groups. These are then used to determine the original text as published; there are three main groups with names: Alexandrian, Western, and Byzantine. Textual critic and biblical scholar Kurt Aland placed it in Category III of his New Testament manuscript text classification system. Category III manuscripts are described as having "a small but not a negligible proportion of early readings, with a considerable encroachment of [Byzantine] readings, and significant readings from other sources as yet unidentified." According to Grenfell and papyrologist Arthur Hunt, its text is close to Codex Vaticanus.

== Textual Variants (following the latest reconstruction) ==
- 5:8a It reads ο before διαβολος along with p72, against the majority of manuscripts.
- 5:8b It lacks τινα along with 03, against the majority of manuscripts.
- 5:9b It lacks τω along with the majority, against p72 01 03.
- 5:9c It reads επιτελεισθαι (to be experiencing) along with the majority against p72 επειτελειται (will be experiencing), and 01 02 03 επιτελεισθε (you are experiencing).
- 5:10aa It lacks τω along with the majority, against p72 01 03.
- 5:10ab It lacks the ns for "Jesus" along with 01 03, against the majority.
- 5:10ba It reads καταρτισει (will be preparing) along with p72c 01 02 03, against the majority reading καταρτισαι υμας (to prepare you).
- 5:10bb It lacks a verb for "establish" along with 02 03, against θεμελιωση (may establish) in p72 and the majority reading θεμελιωσει (will be establishing).
- 5:11a It reads αυτω κρατος (to whom [is] dominion) along with p72 02 03 against the majority reading of αυτω η δοξα και το κρατος (to whom [is] the glory and the dominion).
- 5:11b It reads εις τους αιωνας των αιωνων αμην (to the ages of the ages, Amen) along with the majority against p72 03 εις τους αιωνας αμην (to the ages, Amen).
- 5:12 It lacks the second του, along with p72 against the majority.

== History ==
It is dated by the INTF to the 4th century. Papyrologist Pasquale Orsini dated it to the second half of the 4th century.

Don Barker proposes a wider and earlier range of dates for Uncial 0206, along with Papyrus 39, Papyrus 88 and Uncial 0232; and states that all four could be dated as early as the late second century or as late as the end of the fourth century.

The manuscript was found in Oxyrhynchus by B. P. Grenfell and A. S. Hunt. They published a description of its text.

The manuscript was added to the list of the New Testament manuscripts by textual critic and theologian Ernst von Dobschütz in 1933.

The codex leaf is housed at the Museum of the Bible in Washington, D.C. Its previous home was the United Theological Seminary (name P. Oxy. 1353) in Dayton.

== See also ==
- List of New Testament uncials
- Oxyrhynchus Papyri
- 1 Peter 5
