= Paul E. V. Shannon =

Paul Eugene Virgil Shannon (March 25, 1898 – May 23, 1957) was a bishop of the Evangelical United Brethren Church, elected in 1957.

== Birth and early life ==
Shannon was born in Mountville, Pennsylvania, the fifth child of the Rev. Absalom Lincoln and Linnie (Erb) Shannon. He was named for the Apostle Paul and for Eugene Field, whose writings his parents enjoyed. Fifteen years later, his mother added Virgil to his name. His parents hoped that Paul would become a minister in the Church they loved and served.

Before Paul was three years of age, however, his father died of diphtheria just twelve days before Christmas. Leaving meager financial resources, his mother worked at whatever jobs were available to support her six children. The long hours away from home and the care of the children proved too much. Four of the children were placed in other homes. Only Paul and his invalid sister, Lois, remained with their mother. One brother and sister were in fact the first residents of the Quincy Orphanage in Pennsylvania.

Their hand-to-mouth existence meant there were days without food. Lois, who suffered from a heart ailment, died while still a young teenager. One month before Paul's High School graduation, his mother died. Paul wrote,

"I was called into the room and there was my mother drawing her last breath. She had laid down her life for us as the Good Shepherd did. Worldly separation is cruel, yet we can be thankful that we can not fully realize our loss. I immediately placed my heart in God's will and said, 'They will be done.'"

This marked his decision to enter the Gospel ministry.

== Education ==
His parents had planned for Paul and his brother Carl to attend Lebanon Valley College, where their parents had met. Obviously, their deaths cast a shadow over such dreams. Paul and Carl lived together following their mother's death. And when they inherited a little money from an aunt, they both enrolled. Paul was a student there 1914-1918, and at Hillsdale 1917-18.

In order to attend college, it was necessary for Paul to work during the summer and at other times whenever possible. One summer he secured a job at the steel mill in Steelton, Pennsylvania. His first day on the job was spent cracking limestone rocks with a heavy sledge hammer. By evening his hands were raw and bloody and his muscles ached so much that the pain kept him awake most of the night. Nevertheless, he was back on the job the next morning without complaint. Indeed, explaining to the foreman his need to earn money for college expenses, the foreman bandaged his hands and transferred him to easier work.

Following college graduation from Lebanon Valley in 1918, Paul enrolled at Bonebrake Theological Seminary, Dayton, Ohio.

== Ordained ministry ==
After receiving a License to Preach, Paul was appointed Pastor of two United Brethren Churches near Middletown, Pennsylvania. Under the combined load of college studies and pastoral responsibilities, however, Paul suffered a physical breakdown. This was, in fact, the first of several such episodes which plagued his ministry. Nevertheless, never was there any expression of bitterness of self-pity. Of this occasion, Paul later wrote, "I was not worried or frightened for I knew the Lord would provide for his own, and he surely did."

Following college graduation at twenty years of age, Paul spent the summer as Pastor of the U.B. Church in Veedersburg, Indiana. During his second year in seminary, he began serving the Fairview Church in Dayton, but ill health forced him out of the pulpit. In his farewell message to the Fairview congregation, he said:

"It is no compliment to a pastor to have his work fail in his absence. I have tried to win you to Christ. If I have succeeded, you will be faithful; if I have won you to myself, then the church will fail. The biggest compliment you can pay me is to carry on the work for which I have given my strength."

Two days before Christmas, 1924, the Shannon family moved to a cottage at Mt. Gretna, Pennsylvania.

== Death and burial ==
Bishop Shannon is buried in Home Cemetery, Dallastown, Pennsylvania.

== See also ==
- List of bishops of the United Methodist Church
