= Papyrus 39 =

Papyrus 𝔓^{39}
- New Testament manuscript
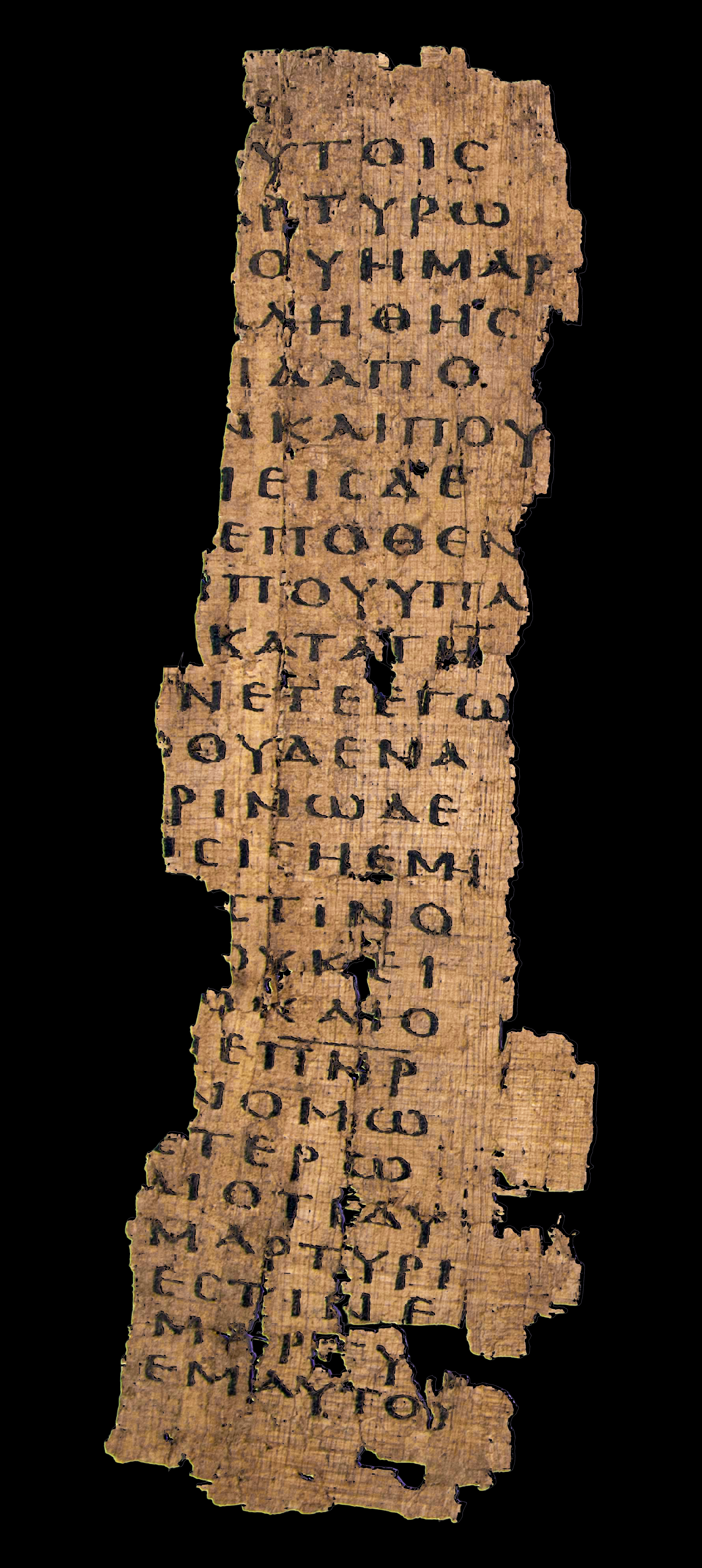
- Recto John 8:14–18
- Name: P. Oxy. XV 1780
- Text: John 8 †
- Date: 3rd century
- Script: Greek
- Found: Egypt
- Now at: The Green Collection
- Cite: Grenfell & A. S. Hunt, Oxyrhynchus Papyri XV, 1922, pp. 7-8.
- Size: 26 by 16 cm
- Type: Alexandrian text-type
- Category: I

Papyrus 39 is an early copy of the New Testament in Greek. It is a papyrus manuscript of the Gospel of John in a fragmentary condition, containing only John 8:14-22. It is designated by the siglum 𝔓^{39} in the Gregory-Aland numbering of New Testament manuscripts. Using the study of comparative writing styles (palaeography), it has been assigned to the 3rd century CE.

== Description ==
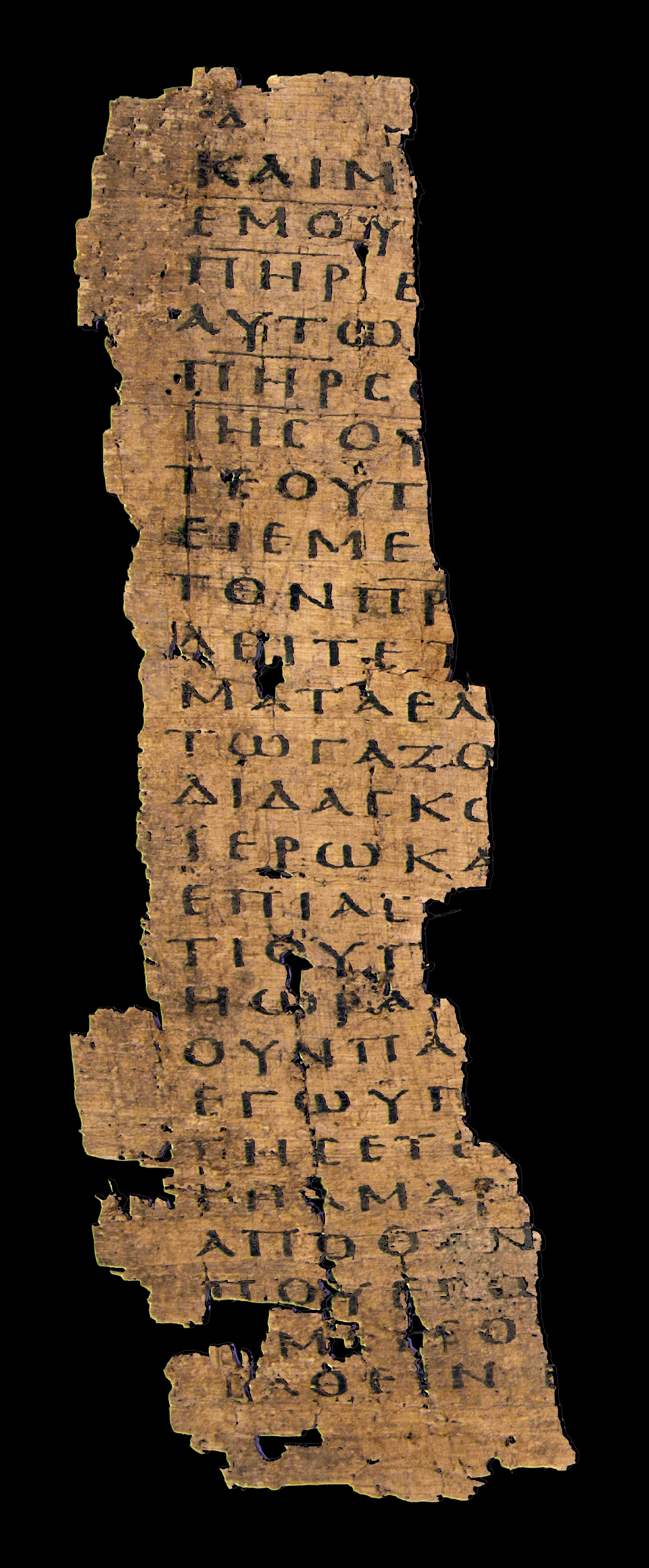
Verso John 8:19–22

The manuscript was likely written by professional scribe, in 25 lines per page, in large, beautiful letters. It has numbered pages. Biblical scholar Don Barker proposes a wider and earlier range of dates for Papyrus 39, along with Uncial 0232, Papyrus 88 and Uncial 0206; and states that all four could be dated as early as the late second century or as late as the end of the fourth century.

== Text ==
The Greek text of this codex is considered a representative of the Alexandrian text-type (or more likely proto-Alexandrian). Biblical scholar Kurt Aland placed it in Category I of his New Testament manuscript classification system. 𝔓^{39} shows agreement with Vaticanus and 𝔓^{75}. There are no singular readings.

Papyrologist Guglielmo Cavallo published a facsimile of 𝔓^{39} in 1967. The manuscript now resides in the Green Collection and is featured at the Museum of the Bible in Washington, D.C.

== See also ==
- Biblical manuscript
- John 8
- List of New Testament papyri
- Papyrus Oxyrhynchus
