= Mayte Richardson =

American cleric

Mayte Richardson (1889–1963) was an American cleric who served as a pastor with the United Brethren Church from her ordination in 1926 till her death in December 1963.

In partnership with Rev. Sara Mouer, Richard served as a permanent pastor in churches across Wisconsin. She also conducted evangelistic work across the United States during a period when the ordination of women was severely limited or denied outright for most Christian denominations including the United Brethren church.

== Early life ==
Richardson was born on February 8, 1889, in Richland County, Wisconsin. As an adult, she taught school in Richland and Grant County, Wisconsin. In 1923, at age 34, Richardson entered the Bonebrake Theological Seminary in Dayton, Ohio.

== Career ==
Richardson graduated from Bonebrake in 1926. While at the seminary, she met Sara Mouer, with whom she made a plan “for sharing their ministerial careers”. Mayte was ordained on September 12, 1926, at Turtle Lake, Wisconsin. After ordination, she joined Mouer for their first assignment at the United Brethren church at Ontario, Wisconsin, from 1926 to 1932. In December 1932 the two pastors were assigned to the United Brethren church in Monroe, Wisconsin. Upon their assignment, the local newspaper stated that “a permanent woman pastor is an innovation in Monroe.”

Richardson and Mouer served in Ontario, Monroe, Loyd-Ithaca, Lime Ridge-Sandusky and Beloit Wisconsin from 1926 to 1959. Richardson and Mouer also served for five years as evangelists from 1936 to 1941, fulfilling calls across the United States. Reverends Richardson and Mouer were known for the musical aspects of their ministry which “included duet signing with Miss Richardson playing the accompaniment”. This partnership continued until Mouer's death on April 27, 1959.

Rychie Breidenstein states in How Shall We Be Known that “these were two women whose way of life and ministry would, today, be subject to all kinds of scrutiny, yet they seemed to have found a way to make ‘all things work together for good’ in God's service” (58).

After Mouer's death, Richardson moved to Richland Center, Wisconsin, where she served as a substitute pastor and conducted special services until her death in December 1963.

Richardson spent the larger part of her career as an ordained minister in a denomination that denied ordination to women. She was ordained under the auspices of the United Brethren Church which had permitted the ordination of women from 1889 to 1946. However following the merger of the United Brethren Church with the Evangelical Association in 1946, the ordination of women was no longer permitted.

It was only in 1968, five years after Richardson's death, that Evangelical United Brethren Church (EUB) members through their merger with the Methodist Church accepted women for ordination as members of the United Methodist Church. While women ministers were an innovation for the rural communities of Wisconsin that Richardson served with Mouer, the ministerial pair were beloved by their communities.
