= Jack N. Lightstone =

- Born: 1951 (age 74–75); Ottawa, Ontario, Canada
- Occupations: University professor, University executive
- Known for: Brock University presidency and scholarship in Hebrew literature
- Spouse: Dorothy Markiewicz

Academic background
- Education: Carleton University, Brown University
- Thesis: (1977)

Jack N. Lightstone is a Canadian professor of history, and former President and Vice-Chancellor of Brock University in St. Catharines, Ontario. He took office on July 1, 2006, to serve a five-year term as President and as a professor of history.

== Background ==
Lightstone was born in Ottawa, Ontario. He received his BA from Carleton University in 1972, his MA in 1974 and went on to complete his Ph.D. in 1977 at Brown University in Rhode Island.

He is an expert on ancient and contemporary North American Judaism, has lectured extensively and written six books. He is fluent in three languages - English, French and Hebrew.

== Administrative career ==
Prior to Brock, he was Provost and Vice-Rector at Concordia University in Montreal, where he is credited with leading an extensive academic planning overhaul while under budget constraints.

== Works ==
- Lightstone, Jack N. (1979). Yose the Galilean. Studies in Judaism in late antiquity. Vol. 31. Leiden: Brill. ISBN 9789004059887. OCLC 715735403.
- ——— (1988). Society, the sacred, and scripture in ancient Judaism: a sociology of knowledge. Studies in Christianity and Judaism. Vol. 3. Waterloo: Wilfrid Laurier University Press. ISBN 9780889209756. OCLC 243565360.
- ——— (1994). The Rhetoric of the Babylonian Talmud, Its Social Meaning and Context. Studies in Christianity and Judaism. Vol. 6. Waterloo: Wilfrid Laurier University Press. ISBN 9780889202382. OCLC 477137125.
- ———; Robbins, Vernon K. (2006). Mishnah and the Social Formation of the Early Rabbinic Guild: a Socio-Rhetorical Approach. Waterloo: Wilfrid Laurier University Press. ISBN 9780889207295. OCLC 753479530.
