= Clyde A. Lynch =

American pastor and professor (1891–1950)

Clyde Alvin Lynch (August 24, 1891 – August 6, 1950) was an American pastor, professor of homiletics and theology, and president of Lebanon Valley College from 1932 until his death. As well as holding positions in national educational associations and in the masonic Grand Lodge of Pennsylvania, Lynch chaired the Pennsylvania Commission on Displaced Persons.

== Early life ==
Lynch was born at Harrisburg, Pennsylvania, a son of John Henry Lynch by his marriage to Carmina Blanche Keys. He was educated at public schools in Harrisburg, and then at the Lebanon Valley Academy.

While not yet twenty, Lynch dedicated himself to the ministry of the Church of the United Brethren in Christ (New Constitution). In 1909 he received a Quarterly Conference License to preach, and in 1910 an Annual Conference License. In 1911–1912, he was a regular pastor on the Centerville Circuit in Lancaster County, and in 1912, while a preparatory student, he was appointed to serve churches in Linglestown and Rockville, in Dauphin County.

In 1914, Lynch entered Lebanon Valley College, and in 1916 was ordained as a minister of the United Brethren, going on to graduate AB in 1918. Throughout his years as an undergraduate, he went on serving the congregations in Linglestown and Rockville. He then proceeded to the Bonebrake Theological Seminary, in Trotwood, Ohio, where from 1918 to 1921 he served as pastor at Antioch and Pyrmont, both in Montgomery County. He took the degree of BD in 1921, before returning to Lebanon Valley College and graduating MA in 1925. He was pastor at Ephrata during that period. From 1925 to 1930, he served as pastor of the Second Church of the United Brethren in Christ in Philadelphia, while studying at the University of Pennsylvania, where he took a second master's degree in 1929. A year before that, Lebanon Valley College had awarded Lynch the honorary degree of Doctor of Divinity, in recognition of his services to the church.

== Academic career ==
In 1928, Lynch joined the Department of Psychology at the University of Pennsylvania, and in 1930 the University awarded him a doctorate in psychology for a dissertation entitled "The memory values of certain alleged emotional toned words as determined by the recognition method". He was then appointed as professor of homiletics and practical theology at the Bonebrake Theological Seminary.

On December 1, 1932, Lynch took office as President of Lebanon Valley College, Annville, his own alma mater, following the death in April 1932 of the previous President, Dr G. D. Gossard. He continued to hold the post until his own early death at the age of 58 in 1950.

In 1943, Lynch created a General Campaign Committee to raise $550,000 "for the purpose of creating a Physical Education Building, of increasing our endowment, and of liquidating our indebtedness." In September 1946, he was able to report "We have emerged without indebtedness, have acquired considerable property, have completed a successful financial campaign, have raised our endowment to a million dollars, and have the largest student body in our history."

In 1946, Lynch also took part in the General Conference which brought about a merger between the Church of the United Brethren in Christ (New Constitution) and the Evangelical Church to form the Evangelical United Brethren Church. He also held several positions in state and national educational associations, in his church, and in the Grand Lodge of Pennsylvania. In 1948 he became Chairman of the new Pennsylvania Commission on Displaced Persons, created as a result of the Displaced Persons Act 1948.

On May 6, 1950, Lynch laid the cornerstone of the new Physical Education Building. He was taken ill at the beginning of August and died on August 6, 1950.

== Personal life ==
On June 30, 1914, Lynch married Edith Basehore of Harrisburg, a daughter of John and Clara Barnhart Basehore. They remained together until his death, after which she continued to live in Annville and then Myerstown, surviving until 1976. Their daughter, Rose Eleanor Lynch, born in 1915 and known as Eleanor, graduated from Lebanon Valley College in the class of 1936, was married in 1940, becoming Mrs Vernon C. Hemperly, and died in 1995. They also had a son, John H. Lynch, who died in 1973.

== Memorial ==
After Lynch's death the college decided to name the new Physical Education Building, still under construction, as the Lynch Memorial Hall. The name was changed to the Clyde A. Lynch Memorial Hall in 1990.

In 2015, a group of the college's students asked for the name of Lynch to be removed from the Memorial Hall, as they considered the name to be a microaggression, reminding them of the practice of lynching; but this suggestion was rejected. This led to brief national interest in the life of Lynch and mocking of the students' requests. The controversy surrounding this was derided by journalist Emily Shire, in an article for The Daily Beast, as "The Dumbest College Renaming Debate Yet".
