= Prathia Hall =

American civil rights leader (1940–2002)

Prathia Laura Ann Hall Wynn
- Born: January 1, 1940; Philadelphia, Pennsylvania, U.S.
- Died: August 12, 2002 (aged 62); Boston, Massachusetts, U.S.
- Occupations: Womanist theologian, ethicist
- Known for: Civil Rights Movement

Prathia Laura Ann Hall Wynn (January 1, 1940 – August 12, 2002) was an American leader and activist in the Civil Rights Movement, a womanist theologian, and ethicist. She was the key inspiration for Martin Luther King Jr.'s "I Have a Dream" speech.

== Biography ==
=== Early life ===
Of African American heritage, Hall was raised in Philadelphia, the daughter of Berkeley L Hall and Ruby Hall, née Johnson. Her father founded Mount Sharon Baptist Church, an inner-city congregation in an under-served area of the city. Her father was a Baptist preacher and a passionate advocate for racial justice, who regarded her as his successor. He inspired her to pursue religion and social justice. Prathia believed she was brought into the world for a reason – to integrate religion and freedom together.

Her leadership potential was recognized early. She credited many groups, such as the National Conference of Christians and Jews for singling her out and helping her to develop. Hall attended predominantly white schools until the age of five; she took a train ride South with her sisters to visit their grandparents. The girls were forced to sit in the segregated seats located just behind the engine. This was her first experience of dehumanizing discrimination.

=== Civil rights involvement ===
By her mid-teens, Hall hoped to join the Civil Rights Movement. In high school, she became involved with Fellowship House, an ecumenical social justice organization, where she studied the philosophy of nonviolence and direct action. After graduating from high school, she attended Temple University, located in Philadelphia, not far from her home. In 1961, while still a junior at Temple, Hall was arrested in Annapolis, Maryland, for participating in the anti-segregation protests on Maryland's rural Eastern Shore. She was held without bail in jail for two weeks.

After graduating from Temple with a degree in political science, Hall joined the Student Nonviolent Coordinating Committee (SNCC); she worked with Charles Sherrod in Southwest Georgia. She became one of the first women field leaders in southwest Georgia. Hall later worked in Terrell County, Georgia, known as "Terrible Terrell County." because of its violence against civil rights activists. African Americans who attempted to register to vote would end up missing or dead. On September 6, 1962, night riders fired into the home where Hall and other activists were staying, wounding her, Jack Chatfield, and Christopher Allen.

She was shot at and jailed many times in Georgia, including in the notorious Sasser, Georgia, jail. While working for SNCC, Hall canvassed door to door to register voters. She also taught in Freedom Schools (educational programs to teach potential voters how to prepare for and pass the required voter registration tests). She became involved in the Albany Movement. She became known for her oratorical power, which she expressed in movement meetings and preaching.

=== "I Have a Dream" ===
In September 1962, Hall agreed to participate in a service commemorating Mount Olive Baptist in Terrell County, which had been burned to the ground by the Ku Klux Klan. It had been a center for voter registration and for other mass meetings in the county among African Americans. The service was attended by Martin Luther King Jr. and SCLC's strategist James Bevel. Hall was scheduled to deliver a prayer during the service. According to Bevel, "As she prayed, she spontaneously uttered and rhythmically repeated an inspiring phrase that captured her vision for the future-'I have a dream'". Bevel claims that her use of this memorable phrase is what inspired King to begin to use it as a fixture in his sermons.

=== Selma, Alabama ===
Hall was called to Selma, Alabama in the winter of 1963 after SNCC field secretary Bernard Lafayette was beaten and jailed there in relation to demonstrations for voter registration. There were numerous instances of brutality. The violence became too much for Hall after the events of Bloody Sunday on March 7, 1965, when marchers intending to go to the state capital were beaten on a bridge just outside the city. Hall suffered a theological crisis related to these events. She resigned from SNCC in 1966 after the organization began to shift away from supporting nonviolence.

=== Later life ===
Hall decided to pursue divinity studies and ordination, after many years of wrestling with a calling to the ministry. She moved to Roosevelt, New York with her husband Ralph Wynn. While living in NY, she earned a Master of Divinity, Master of Theology, and Ph.D. from Princeton Theological Seminary, in New Jersey. In 1978 Hall began serving as pastor at the Mt. Sharon Baptist in Philadelphia, driving there every weekend from Princeton. Hall struggled with religion after her daughter died of a stroke. She later had some chronic issues, suffering from pain due to injury in an old accident. This ultimately contributed to her death many years later.

Hall was one of the first women ordained in the American Baptist Churches USA. Hall joined the faculty at United Theological Seminary in Dayton, Ohio, eventually becoming dean of African American studies, and director of the school's Harriet Miller Women's Center. She was a visiting scholar at the Interdenominational Theological Center in Atlanta. She later joined the faculty at the Boston University School of Theology, holding the Martin Luther King Chair in Social Ethics. Her work focused on womanist theology and ethics.

Hall was well known for being a compelling speaker and preacher. In 1997, Ebony magazine named Hall as number one on their list of "Top 15 Greatest Black Women Preachers". She remained active in her role in the until her death in 2002 after a long battle with cancer, at the age of 62.

== Quotations about Hall ==
I remember sitting one day in the little area outside Forman's, transcribing a mass meeting speech given by Prathia Hall, a SNCC field secretary then posted to Selma, Alabama. As she described the violence in Selma, the awful beauty of her words—and the intensity of her moral outrage—took me by such force that I remember typing on to that long, green mimeo stencil with tears just streaming down my face. It was as if some force of nature had swept me away to another place.

— Judy Richardson

Prathia Hall is one of the platform speakers I would prefer not to follow.

— Martin Luther King Jr.

We who believe in freedom cannot rest until it comes.

— Prathia Hall

== See also ==
- List of civil rights leaders

== Further ==
- Faith S. Holsaert; et al., eds. (2010). Hands on the Freedom Plow: Personal Accounts by Women in SNCC. of Illinois Press.
