= Donald Hilliard =

Donald Hilliard Jr.
- Born: June 28, 1957 (age 69)
- Spouse: Phyllis Hilliard (m. 1982)
- Children: Leah Joy Alease Hilliard, Charisma Joy Denise Hilliard, and Destiny Joy Hilliard
- Parent(s): Donald Hilliard Sr. (father) and Alease Chapman-Hilliard (mother)
- Website: www.DonaldHilliardJr.org

Donald Hilliard Jr. (born June 28, 1957) is an American preacher, author, painter, professor, producer, and the senior pastor of Cathedral International. The church has three locations and 50 ministries serving three New Jersey areas: Perth Amboy, Asbury Park and Plainfield. Hilliard is the presiding bishop and founder of the Covenant Ecumenical Fellowship and Cathedral Assemblies Inc., serving as spiritual adviser and mentor for several pastors and churches in the United States and West Africa."

Hilliard was named as one of "the top 20 black preachers in America" by The Root, a Washington Post publication. He is the author of 14 books including his latest, 55 and Counting, which was released in December 2013.

https://www.donaldhilliardjr.org/

== Early life and family ==
Hilliard was born in East Orange, New Jersey, and is one of two children of Donald Hilliard Sr. and Alease Elizabeth Hilliard-Chapman. His father, Donald Hilliard Sr. was an Army veteran, and a postal worker until his death. His mother, Alease Elizabeth Hilliard-Chapman, better known as Mother Hilliard, was active in Cathedral International. She died on August 26, 2013. At the age of 21 Hilliard was ordained into the gospel ministry by the Progressive National Baptist Convention, Inc. in 1978. He married his wife Phyllis in 1981. Two years later in October 1983 Hilliard became senior pastor of a small house of worship called Second Baptist Church.

== Education ==
Hilliard earned a Bachelor of Arts degree from Eastern College (now Eastern University), St. David's, Pennsylvania, the Master of Divinity degree from Princeton Theological Seminary, Princeton, NJ, and an earned Doctor of Ministry degree from United Theological Seminary, Dayton, Ohio, as a Dr. Samuel D. Proctor Fellow.

== Career ==
In 1983, as Hilliard became senior pastor of Second Baptist Church, the church membership was 125. Under his leadership, the church experienced unprecedented growth and soon became too large for its Broad Street location. While a more spacious residence was being sought (in 1990 to 1992), members worshipped in the auditorium of the McGinnis School. In April 1992, Cathedral International moved into its present location, the renovated, 1,500-seat Majestic Theater on Madison Avenue.

=== Preaching style/Platform ===
Though a member of the American Baptist Churches, USA denomination, Cathedral International's style is Pentecostal. Hilliard is the presiding prelate of the Covenant Ecumenical Fellowship & Cathedral Assemblies, Inc. He is a bishop in the Joint College of Bishops, which serves as development center for the Episcopacy in the African American culture. The College of Joint Bishops offers an adjutant school, a Helpmeet and Episcopal companions forum; Episcopal Installation Services to Reformations, a Scholarship Program; and International College events reconnecting the American Episcopacy with the global church. Hilliard's platform for the past few decades has focused on building healthy families. He stated to the Courier News, "the role of family and faith are all critically important." This theme is clear in many of his books and conferences.

== Books ==
Hilliard is the author of 13 books on a variety of self-help topics. He addressed his prolific writing in his book, Midlife, Manhood, and Ministry. He states, "The Lord has been faithful to me, and I want to pass on that cloak of knowledge to others. I acknowledge fully that the Lord has allowed me to walk through doors that have swung on welcomed hinges, but I always left the doors ajar so that those coming behind me could step through easily. That is what I see in my future and what I work toward."

- 55 and Counting (Xulon Press, 2014)
- Midlife, Manhood, and Ministry (Judson Press, 2013)
- Stop the Funeral, Revised: Reaching a Generation Determined to Kill Itself (LiPav Publishing, 2013)
- Somebody Say Yes! Answers to the Most Pressing Issues of the New Millennium (Evergreen Press, 2001)
- A Safe Harbor Begins @ Home (Evergreen Press, 2001)
- Faith in the Face of Fear: A Christian Response to the 9-11 Attacks and Ongoing Threats (Evergreen Press, 2002)
- In the Grip of His Mercy (Faith Communications, 2005)
- Church Growth from an African American Perspective (Judson Press, 2005)
- After the Fall: Resurrecting Your Life from Shame, Disgrace, and Guilt (Destiny Image, 2011)
- Journal Your Journey: This Too Will Pass (iUniverse.com, 2009)
- Faith in the Face of Fear: A Call to Courage in the Time of Trouble —10th Anniversary Edition (Evergreen Press, 2011)
- A Lenten Journey—Lessons Learned in the Wilderness (Godzchild Inc., 2012)
- Pentecost: Real Power for Real Times (Amazon Digital Services, Inc., 2012)

== Personal life ==
Bishop Hilliard has been married to Phyllis Thompson, who is also a pastor, since September 12, 1981. They have three daughters, Leah Joy Alease Hilliard, Charisma Joy Denise Hilliard, and Destiny Joy Hilliard-Thomas along with a son-in-law Joseph Thomas. He has two grandchildren, Joseph Donald and Khori Alease. He has one sister, Denise Darlene Hilliard.

== Play ==
In April 2013, Hilliard added "Executive Producer" to his titles. He produced the stage play "Stop the Funeral" held at the Union County Performing Arts Center in Rahway, New Jersey, which featured Marvin Sapp. The play was based upon his book and adapted for the stage by writer Fernandel Almonor, who served as the director. According to Hilliard, the play was to serve as a wake-up to youth against gun violence. He stated, "this play will be the catalyst to create an awakening. It is a call to action for the youth who will see it...that they will realize the devastation of gun violence upon their families, friends, and communities and get involved to stop the funeral." Based upon the successfully sold-out premiere, Hilliard developed plans to produce the play in other cities.

== Academia ==
Hilliard is the former Group Convener and Mentor of the Donald Hilliard Fellows Doctor of Ministry Program and visiting professor of Church Renewal at Drew University School of Theology in Madison, NJ. In 2012, he established the Hilliard/Sweet Concentration with Professor Leonard Sweet, as a part of the Doctor of Ministry Program at Drew University. In December 2013 Bishop Hilliard became a Senior Faculty Fellow at the Northwind Institute launched the DHM Academy as a Northwind Institute Program Partner.

== Artwork ==
In 2006, after overcoming health challenges, Hilliard revisited his craft of painting by creating original pieces of art through his abstract expressionistic company, Pulpit to the Palate Art. The collection consists of premier collections of over 70 original pieces, which include a "From the Pulpit to the Palate" series. His "Let Go, Let Gesture: Abstract Ascension" collection has been exhibited at the Dragonfly Fine Arts Gallery in Martha's Vineyard and is currently at Tucker Contemporary Art. His art work may be view on his new website: "From The Pulpit to the Palette" https://pulpit2palette.com/

== Awards and honors ==
- Religious Interfaith Award from United Muslim Inc. Other (2013)
- Clergy of the Year Award by The New York Council of Churches (2008)
- Roberto Clemente Special Recognition Award from the Puerto Rican Association for Human Development, Perth Amboy, NJ (2001)
- New Jersey Child Assault Prevention (CAP) Award (1999)
- Distinguished Alumnus of the Year Award from Princeton Theological Seminary, Princeton, NJ (1995) and Eastern College, St. David's, PA (1997)
- The American Baptist Church, USA Evangelism Award (1996).
- Inducted into the Martin Luther King Jr. Board of Preachers at Morehouse College, Atlanta, GA. (1995)
- Perth Amboy Chamber of Commerce Executive of the Year Award (1994)
- Drew University Martin Luther King Jr. Humanitarian Award (1994)
- Humanitarian Award, National Conference for Community and Justice
