= Carolyn Gillette =

American hymnwriter and pastor

Carolyn Winfrey Gillette is a hymn writer and Presbyterian pastor. She has written over 400 hymns. Gillette and her husband Bruce are the pastors of First Presbyterian Union Church in Owego, New York since December 2018. They have previously served as pastors in Philadelphia, Wilmington, Delaware, Pitman, New Jersey and Sussex County, New Jersey.

Gillette was born in Harrisonburg, Virginia on May 28, 1961. She grew up in a Methodist family, and her father was a graduate of Drew Seminary. She was baptized and confirmed in Methodist congregations. She graduated from United Methodist Church-related Lebanon Valley College. She and her husband Bruce are graduates for Princeton Theological Seminary. They are the parents of three children and four grandchildren.
