= Otis Moss III =

African-American pastor (born 1970)

The Reverend Otis Moss III
- Born: September 16, 1970 (age 56)
- Education: Morehouse College (BA); Yale University (MDiv); Chicago Theological Seminary (DMin)
- Spouse: Monica Brown
- Parent: Otis Moss Jr.

Ecclesiastical career
- Religion: Christianity (Protestant)
- Church: Progressive National Baptist Convention; United Church of Christ
- Ordained: 1995
- Congregations: Tabernacle Baptist Church (Augusta, Georgia); Trinity United Church of Christ

Otis Moss III (born 16 September 1970) is an American Protestant minister who is the pastor of Chicago's Trinity United Church of Christ. He espouses black theology and speaks about reaching inner-city black youth.

== Early life and education ==
His father Otis Moss Jr. was an affiliate of Martin Luther King Jr. working together in the Southern Christian Leadership Conference and serving in 1971 as co-pastor with his father Martin Luther King Sr. at Ebenezer Baptist Church.

After growing up in the Cleveland suburb of Shaker Heights, Ohio, graduating from Shaker Heights High School, Moss attended Morehouse College in Georgia as an undergraduate, initially majoring in political science and film with the intent of becoming a filmmaker. He was a runner and named by the NCAA as an All-American Track and Field athlete. After hearing his call to the ministry during track practice, he changed majors to religion and philosophy and graduated with honors in 1992.

He then attended Yale University in Connecticut, receiving in 1995 a Master of Divinity degree with a concentration in ethics and theology. During his time at Yale he became enamored of the black theology of James Hal Cone. He was also ordained as a Baptist minister by his father in 1995.

Moss moved to Denver to study for a PhD in religion and social change from a joint program of the University of Denver and the Iliff School of Theology, a Methodist seminary. However, he entered ministry full-time before completing the degree. While in Denver, he became the minister of youth programs at the New Hope Baptist Church. A sermon tape from a youth rally was given to the retiring pastor of Tabernacle Baptist Church in Augusta, Georgia, leading to his call there.

== Career ==
=== Tabernacle Baptist years ===
In 1997, Moss moved to Augusta, Georgia, to take up the pastorate at Tabernacle Baptist Church, founded in 1885 as Beulah Baptist Church. During the Civil Rights Movement the church served as a local base for that movement.

At the time Moss took over the church, it had 125 members, growing to 2,100 members by the time he left it in 2006, reportedly mostly through the inclusion of formerly unchurched young people. During his tenure, the church also undertook a major renovation of their historic building.

In 2000, he published a sermon collection entitled Redemption in a Red Light District: Messages of Hope, Healing and Empowerment, consisting of sermons from his first year of ministry. He also periodically swapped pulpits with the pastor of the First Baptist Church of Augusta, where the Southern Baptist Convention was originally organized in support of slavery.

In 2002, he was the first recipient of a prize, carrying a $25,000 stipend, for exemplary community service, evangelism and preaching. He had been nominated by the historian of the Chautauqua Institution in New York who considered him one of the best to have preached there. The prize is jointly awarded by three Presbyterian organizations; the Columbia Theological Seminary, the Presbyterian College, and the Peachtree Presbyterian Church of Atlanta, Georgia.

During this period, Moss was a member of the Progressive National Baptist Convention as well as state and local Baptist organizations. Politically, he was a member of the NAACP and the Georgia branch of the Rainbow/Push Coalition founded by Jesse Jackson. He also served on the boards of the local United Way chapter and Augusta's black history museum, which is named after Lucy Craft Laney.

=== Trinity United Church of Christ ===
Moss received two job offers. One was to come to the Olivet Institutional Baptist Church in Cleveland, Ohio to succeed his father as pastor, the other to move to Chicago's Trinity United Church, a United Church of Christ (UCC) church pastored by Jeremiah Wright, to become Wright's successor at the roughly 8,500-member megachurch. Moss says that after prayer and fasting, he felt God's call was for him to go to Chicago, and did so in 2006, initially as Wright's assistant. Moss assumed responsibility for regular preaching at Trinity on March 9, 2008, and was installed as the senior pastor in May 2009.

Early in 2007, Moss was one of four additional contributors to the book The Gospel Remix: Reaching the Hip Hop Generation by Professor Ralph C. Watkins of the Fuller Theological Seminary. That summer, Moss was one of several black ministers who gave eulogies at a mock funeral the NAACP put on for the word nigger, where he described it as "the greatest child that racism ever birthed".

As of March 2008, Moss is a board member of The Christian Century.

== Personal life ==
Moss is married and has two children.
