= United Methodist seminaries =

The United Methodist Church maintains 13 denominational seminaries which are funded, in part, by the Methodist Ministerial Education Fund. They are listed below:

Seminary	University	Date	Location
Drew Theological School	Drew University	1867	Madison, New Jersey
Candler School of Theology	Emory University	1914	Atlanta
Boston University School of Theology	Boston University	1839	Boston
Claremont School of Theology		1885	Los Angeles, California
Duke Divinity School	Duke University	1926	Durham, North Carolina
Garrett-Evangelical Theological Seminary		1853	Evanston, Illinois
Iliff School of Theology	University of Denver (formerly)	1892	Denver
Methodist Theological School in Ohio		1956	Delaware, Ohio
Perkins School of Theology	Southern Methodist University	1911	University Park, Texas
Saint Paul School of Theology		1958	Overland Park, Kansas
United Theological Seminary		1871	Trotwood, Ohio
Wesley Theological Seminary		1882	Washington, D.C.
Gammon Theological Seminary		1958	Atlanta

== See also ==
- List of evangelical seminaries and theological colleges#Methodist
