= Papyrus 88 =

Papyrus 𝔓^{88}
- New Testament manuscript
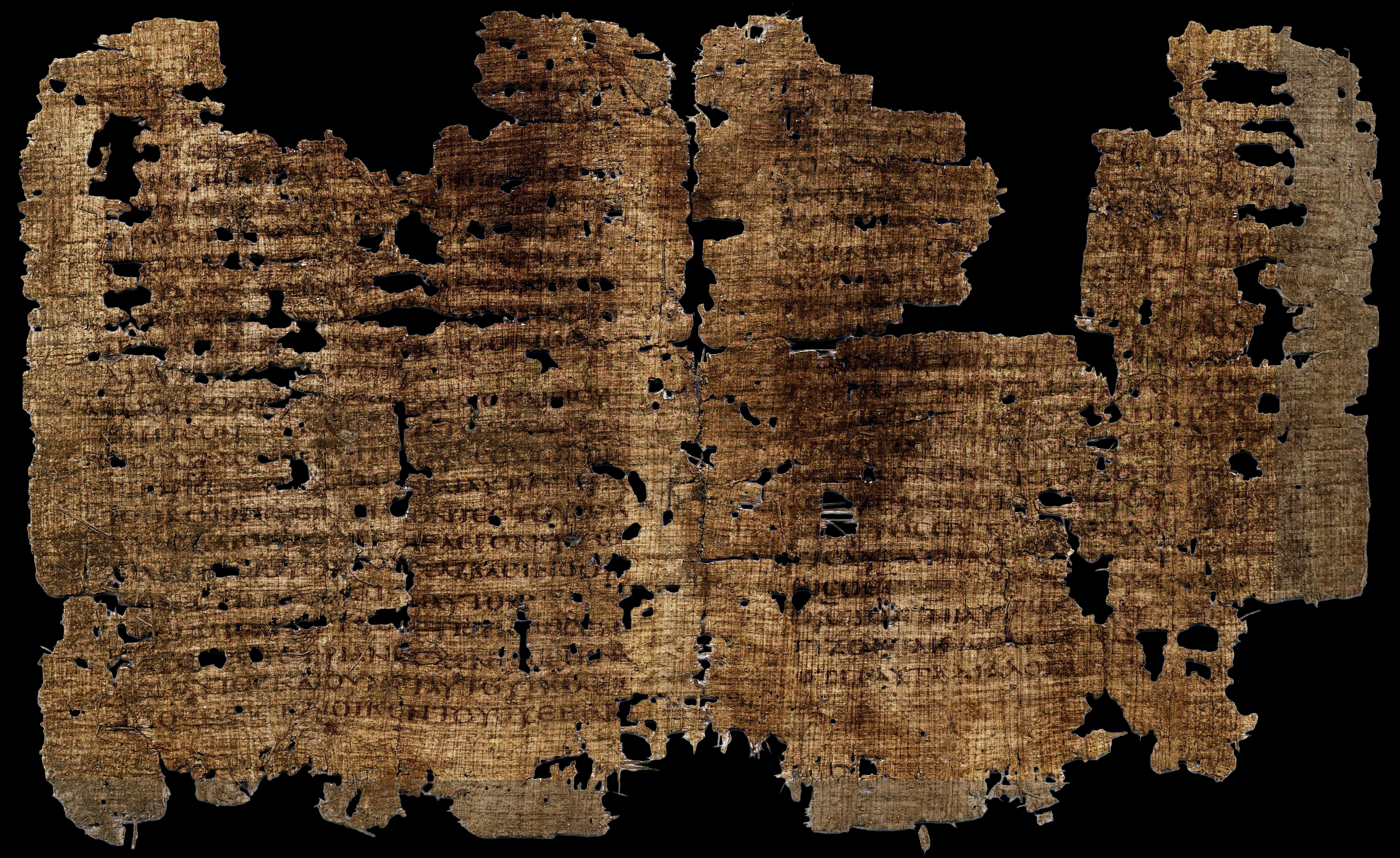
- Recto, Mark 2:1-8; 2:20-26
- Text: Gospel of Mark 2 †
- Date: 4th century
- Script: Greek
- Found: Egypt
- Now at: Università Cattolica del Sacro Cuore
- Cite: S. Daris, Aegyptus, 52 (1972), pp. 80-88.
- Type: mixed
- Category: III

Papyrus 88 (in the Gregory-Aland numbering), designated by 𝔓^{88}, is a single leaf from an early copy of the New Testament in Greek. It is a papyrus manuscript of the Gospel of Mark. The surviving texts of Mark are verses 2:1-26. The manuscript palaeographically has been assigned to the 4th century.

Don Barker proposes a wider and earlier range of dates for Papyrus 88, along with Uncial 0232, Papyrus 39 and Uncial 0206; and states that all four could be dated as early as the late second century or as late as the end of the fourth century.

Text

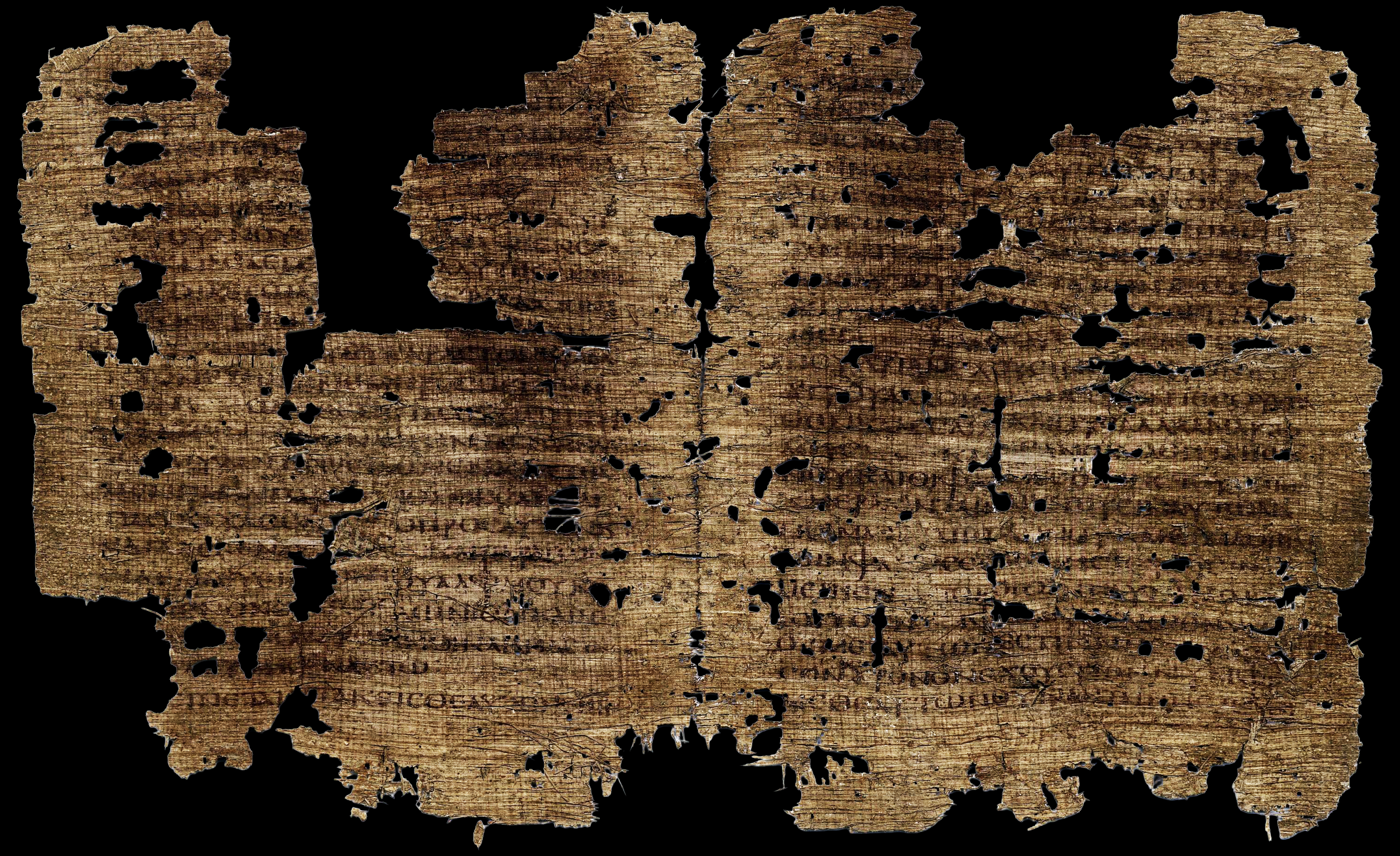
Verso, Mark 2:8-19

The Greek text of this codex is mixed. Aland placed it in Category III.

Location

It is currently housed at the Università Cattolica del Sacro Cuore (P. Med. Inv. no. 69.24) in Milan.

== See also ==
- List of New Testament papyri
