= Barbara Ann Reynolds =

American journalist and author (born 1942)

Barbara Ann Reynolds (born August 17, 1942) is an African-American journalist and author of a notable biography of Jesse Jackson, Jesse Jackson, the Man, the Myth, and the Movement, published in 1975.

== Career ==
Reynolds worked a social worker in Cleveland.

In 1968, she was hired by the Cleveland Press. In 1969, she was hired by Ebony, where she was an assistant editor and the author of their monthly food column. That year, she briefly wrote for Chicago Today before moving to the Chicago Tribune, where she served as the Washington correspondent until 1980. She contributed a regular column to USA Today until 1996.

While at the Tribune she covered Jesse Jackson, with whom she at first had a close friendship. Later her relationship with Jackson took a more journalistic and professional tone, and she published the controversial and sometimes critical biography, which she later revisited as Jesse Jackson, America's David.

Amongst other books, she wrote And Still We Rise: Interviews with 50 Black Role Models. In 1998, she released No, I Won’t Shut Up: 30 Years of Telling It Like It Is, that included a foreword by Coretta Scott King. In 2005, she published an autobiography, Out of Hell and Living Well.

== Personal life ==
Reynolds was born August 17, 1942 in Columbus, Ohio.

She graduated from Howard University Divinity School in 1992, and was ordained in 1993. She went on to graduate from United Theological Seminary in 1997 with a Doctor of Ministry. She served as a minister at Mt. Calvary Baptist Church in Washington, D.C.
