= Bayan Islamic Graduate School =

U.S. educational institution

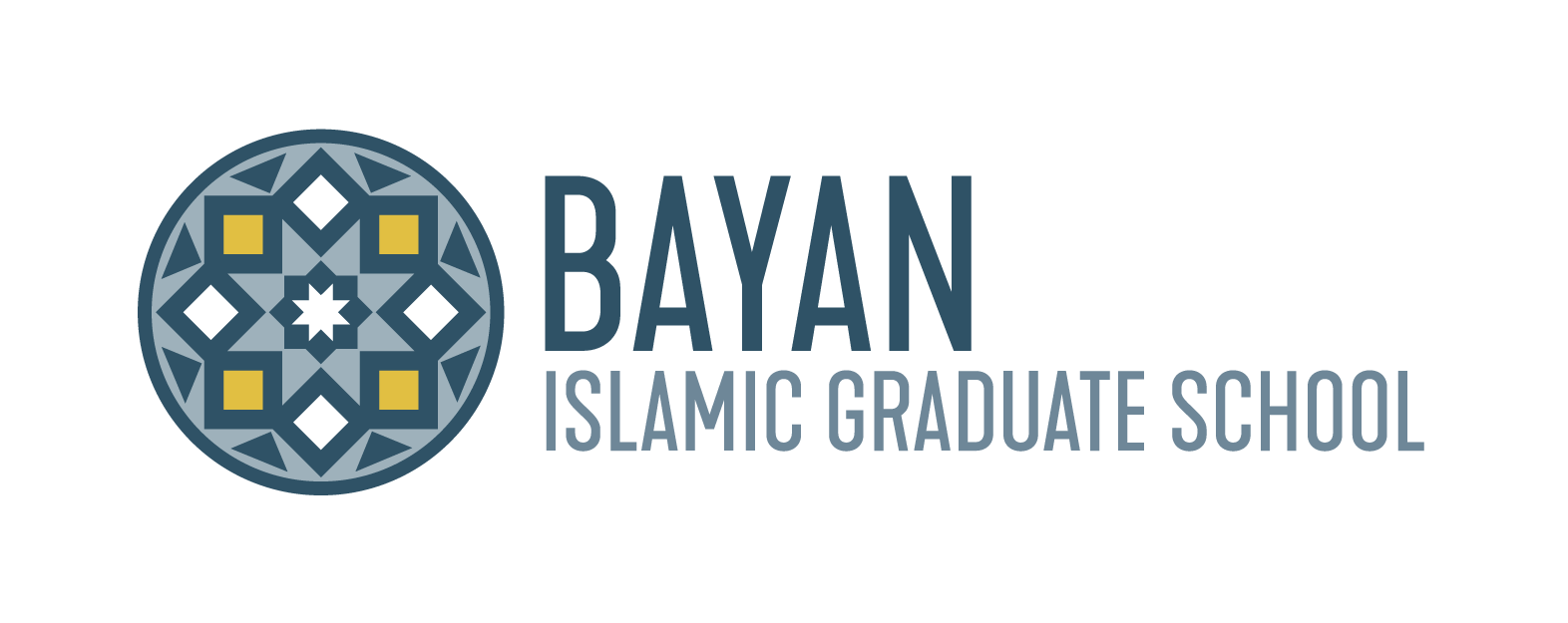
- Former name: Bayan Claremont
- Type: Private
- Established: 2011; 15 years ago
- Academic affiliations: Chicago Theological Seminary
- President: Dr. Jihad Turk
- Location: Chicago, Illinois, U.S. 41.785733°N 87.591057°W
- Campus: Urban, 78,000 sq ft (7,200 m^{2}), 4-story seminary on the University of Chicago campus
- Colors
- Website: bayanonline.org
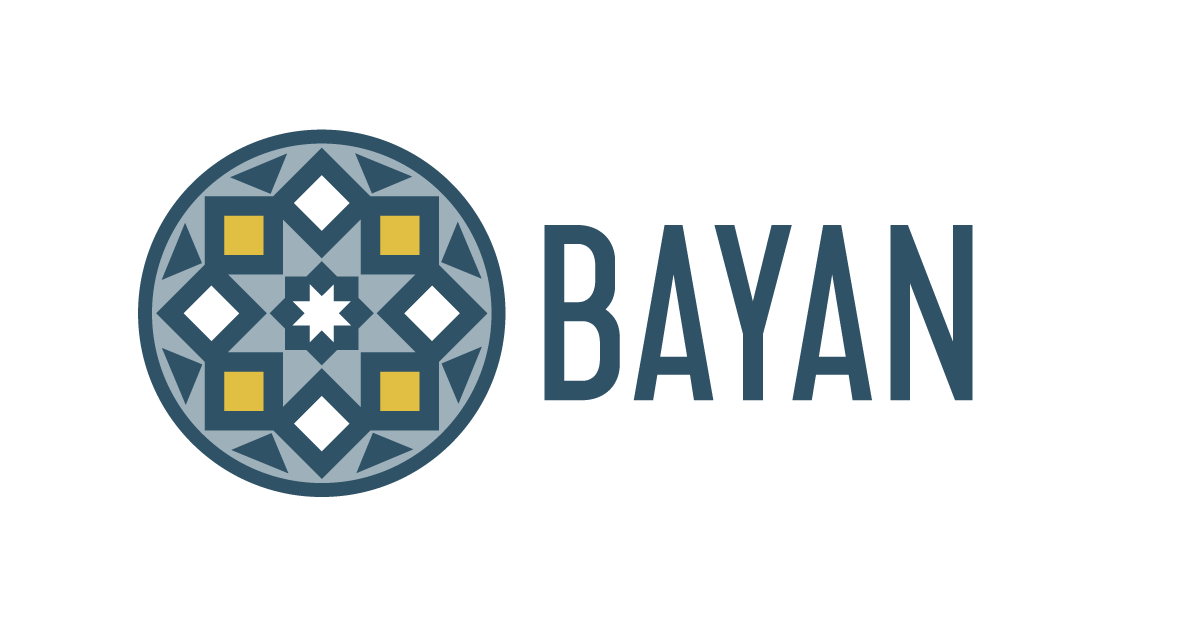

Bayan Islamic Graduate School is a private Islamic graduate school based in Orange, California with its campus located in Chicago, Illinois. It offers accredited Master of Arts degrees in four subject areas: Islamic Studies, Islamic Leadership, Islamic Education, and Islamic Theology as well as a Master of Divinity in Islamic Chaplaincy. In the Fall 2023, Bayan began offering a Doctor of Ministry (DMin) in Islamic Leadership.

Bayan's degree programs are offered in partnership with the Chicago Theological Seminary (CTS), one of Chicago's oldest seminaries.

Bayan also offers several continuing education programs including a graduate certificate in conjunction with CTS, an Intensive Arabic Language course online, and unlimited access to self-paced courses in Islamic Studies, Chaplaincy, and other subjects through Bayan On-Demand.

In 2019, Bayan launched an educational tour initiative called Bayan Tours. Through Bayan Tours, Bayan offers six to eight guided teaching tours to destinations of historical, cultural, and spiritual interest. In 2024, these excursions included Iran, Egypt, Morocco, Vietnam/Cambodia, Uzbekistan, Southern Spain, Turkey, and The Gambia & Senegal.

== History ==
Bayan was established in 2011 through a collaboration with the Claremont School of Theology (CST) and the Islamic Center of Southern California with the purpose of preparing spiritual and religious leaders (such as pastors, priests, imams, and chaplains) who learn in an inter-religious environment. Bayan's first graduating class was in 2013.

In 2016, Bayan Launched the first 72-unit accredited M.Div. in Islamic Chaplaincy, and the first 48-unit accredited M.A. in Islamic Education in the United States.

In 2017, with the blessing of Muhammad Ali's family, Bayan launched a full-tuition scholarship for students who are working as leaders in underserved communities nationwide. During the same year, Bayan also launched Bayan On-Demand, a subscription platform giving the community access the same graduate courses Bayan students study. Bayan On-Demand currently serves nearly 3,000 subscribers.

In 2019, Bayan formed a partnership with the Chicago Theological Seminary (CTS).

In 2023, Bayan launched a Doctor of Ministry (DMIn) program in Islamic Leadership.

As of 2024, Bayan has 95 alumni and expects to enroll 150 students during the 2024–25 academic year.

== Founder and President ==
Dr. Jihad Turk is the founding president of Bayan. Prior to founding Bayan, Dr. Turk served as the Religious Director of the Islamic Center of Southern California, the oldest and largest mosque in the Los Angeles area.

== Accreditation ==
As of fall 2020, Bayan's degree programs are being offered in partnership with the Chicago Theological Seminary (CTS), founded in 1855. Degree programs at CTS are accredited by the Association of Theological Schools (ATS) as well as the Higher Learning Commission (HLC) of the state of Illinois. CTS, founded in 1855, is affiliated with the United Church of Christ (UCC).

Bayan's programs constitute “concentrations” within established accredited degree programs of the host institution. The majority of program requirements are fulfilled by enrolling in courses provided by Bayan. In due course, Bayan intends to apply for independent accreditation with the appropriate regional bodies.

Bayan initially operated beginning in Fall 2011 as a division of the Claremont School of Theology (CST), which is accredited by the Western Association of Schools and Colleges (WASC) and the Association of Theological Schools (ATS). CST, founded in 1885, is affiliated with the United Methodist Church (UMC). CST's leadership took the pioneering step of incubating Bayan as one of the first Muslim American theological schools, with the purpose of enabling authentic Islamic education and leadership development, and sincere interreligious learning among students of various faith backgrounds. Bayan's academic partnership with CST will conclude in June 2021, with the graduation of Bayan students completing programs they began at CST.

== Graduate degree programs ==
As of 2024, Bayan offers six degree programs.

- Master of Arts in Islamic Studies
- Master of Arts in Islamic Leadership
- Master of Arts in Islamic Education
- Master of Arts in Islamic Theology
- Master of Divinity in Islamic Chaplaincy
- Doctor of Ministry in Islamic Leadership

== Bayan On-Demand ==
In 2017, Bayan launched BayanONLINE, now called Bayan-On-Demand, a digital learning platform that includes over 350 hours of course content that speak directly to a multitude of issues Muslims face today. The on-demand content is curated by Bayan's faculty and is the same instruction that degree-seeking students have access to. Bayan-On-Demand offers an “All Access Pass” which provides subscribers with full access to Bayan's digital content library. Bayan adds to its library on a regular basis.

As of Fall 2024, courses available through Bayan On-Demand include:

- Abrahamic Faiths in Conversation
- Chaplaincy in Contexts
- Counseling Muslims
- Foundations of Islamic Studies
- Foundation of the Islamic Worldview
- Fundraising Strategies for Religious Non-Profits
- Introduction to Islamic Legal Philosophy
- Islam and Liberal Citizenship
- Islam & West Africa
- Islam in America
- Islam in Blackamerica: From Slavery to Hip-Hop
- Islamic Bioethics
- Islamic History
- Islamic Law and Legal Theory
- Islamic Mysticism
- Islamic Spirituality & Leadership
- Islamic Theology and Philosophy
- Muslim Adolescent Identity Development
- Peacebuilding, Conflict Resolution & Restorative Justice
- Prophetic Biography
- Prophetic Model of Ministry
- Public Speaking: Islam & The Media
- The Quran: Composition, Collection & Teachings
- Religious Care for Communities in Crisis
- School Leadership, Board Management & Change Agency
- Self-Development and Spiritual Care
- Spiritual Development & Self Care
- Universal Maxims In Islamic Law & Beyond

== Notable faculty ==
Bayan has its own faculty but also invites faculty from other institutions to teach courses in their hybrid intensive format (a format that utilizes online platforms as well as in-person teaching).

- Dr. Jihad Saafir, Founder, Islah Academy
- Shaykh Jihad Brown
- Dr. Umar Faruq Abd-Allah
- Dr. Ovamir Anjum
- Dr. Jonathan Brown, associate professor, Georgetown University
- Dr. Sherman Jackson, King Faisal Chair of Islamic Thought and Culture and Professor of Religion and American Studies and Ethnicity at the University of Southern California
- Edina Lekovic, public affairs consultant, Muslim Public Affairs Council
- Dr. Joseph Lumbard, a co-author of The Study Qur'an
- Dr. Rami Nashashibi, founder of the Inner-City Muslim Action Network
- Dr. Omid Safi, Associate Professor of Islamic Studies, Duke University
- Shaykh Suhaib Webb
- Najah Bazzy, RN, founder and CEO, Zaman International School
- Dr. Maria Massi Dakake
- Omar Suleiman (imam)

== Bayan tours ==
As part of its educational programming, Bayan Tours offers family-friendly, faculty-led educational tours to world heritage destinations, with previous tours to the Holy Land, Southern Spain, Singapore, Iran, Senegal, Turkey, The Gambia, Egypt, Uzbekistan, and Bosnia-Herzegovina. Each tour is led by one or more faculty members who provide daily background lectures and insights about the historical and contemporary contexts. Future tours are planned for Cape Town and Vietnam/Cambodia.

== Notable alumni ==
- Preacher Moss, author and comedian
- Dr. Jihad Saafir, Founding Executive Director, Islah Academy

== Notable support ==
In 2020, Bayan received a grant of $234,500 from the Templeton Foundation to support Bayan's “Advanced Islamic Theology and Contemporary Thought Program.” The project funding enabled Bayan to develop three new courses for an Advanced Islamic Theology concentration within the Master of Arts (MA) degree, inclusive of a special certificate given to students completing the course sequence. The courses have been developed based on a period of dedicated research and conceptualization by Resident Scholar Shaykh Jihad Brown.

In 2021, Bayan received a $1,000,000 grant from the Annenberg Foundation to expand its programming.
