= Abner Mikva =

American politician and judge (1926–2016)

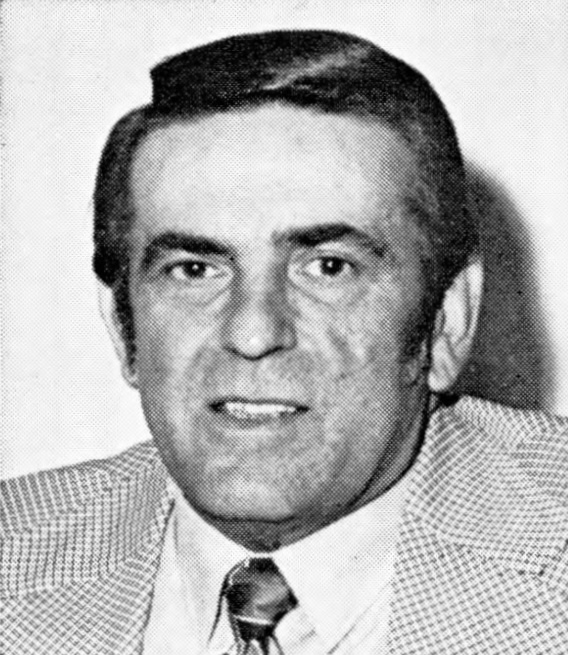
- Mikva in 1977

White House Counsel
- In office October 1, 1994 – November 1, 1995
- President: Bill Clinton
- Preceded by: Lloyd Cutler
- Succeeded by: Jack Quinn

Chief Judge of the United States Court of Appeals for the District of Columbia Circuit
- In office January 19, 1991 – September 19, 1994
- Preceded by: Patricia Wald
- Succeeded by: Harry T. Edwards

Judge of the United States Court of Appeals for the District of Columbia Circuit
- In office September 26, 1979 – September 19, 1994
- Appointed by: Jimmy Carter
- Preceded by: Seat established
- Succeeded by: Merrick Garland

Member of the U.S. House of Representatives from Illinois
- In office January 3, 1975 – September 26, 1979
- Preceded by: Samuel H. Young
- Succeeded by: John Porter
- Constituency: 10th district
- In office January 3, 1969 – January 3, 1973
- Preceded by: Barratt O'Hara
- Succeeded by: Ralph Metcalfe (redistricted)
- Constituency: 2nd district

Personal details
- Born: Abner Joseph Mikva; January 21, 1926 Milwaukee, Wisconsin, U.S.
- Died: July 4, 2016 (aged 90) Chicago, Illinois, U.S.
- Party: Democratic
- Education: University of Wisconsin, Milwaukee (attended); Washington University (BA); University of Chicago (JD)

Abner Joseph Mikva (/ˈæbnər ˈmɪkvə/ AB-nər MIK-və; January 21, 1926 – July 4, 2016) was an American politician, federal judge, and legal scholar. He was a member of the Democratic Party. After serving in the Illinois House of Representatives, Mikva ran for the U.S. Congress in 1966 but lost the primary to incumbent congressman Barrett O'Hara. In 1968, Mikva defeated O'Hara. Mikva served in the United States House of Representatives representing Illinois's 2nd congressional district (1969–1973) and 10th congressional district (1975–1979). He was appointed as a United States circuit judge of the United States Court of Appeals for the District of Columbia Circuit by President Jimmy Carter, serving from 1979 to 1994. He served as the White House Counsel from 1994 to 1995 during Bill Clinton's presidency. He was one of the few people in modern times to serve in the executive, legislative and judicial branches of the Federal government.

In his later career, Mikva taught at the University of Chicago Law School, the Georgetown University Law Center and the Northwestern University Pritzker School of Law. He mentored future President of the United States Barack Obama and future United States Attorney General Merrick Garland (who also succeeded him on the D.C. Circuit) during their early years in law. In 2014, Obama honored Mikva with the Presidential Medal of Freedom.

== Early life and family ==
Mikva was born in Milwaukee, Wisconsin, the son of Ida (Fishman) and Henry Abraham Mikva, Jewish immigrants escaping from pogroms in Ukraine. Mikva and his parents spoke Yiddish at home. During the Great Depression, his father was often unemployed and the family relied on welfare. Abner attended local public schools. During World War II, he enlisted and was trained in the United States Army Air Corps, but the war ended the day before he was due to be deployed. Afterward, the GI Bill enabled Mikva to attend the University of Wisconsin–Milwaukee before transferring to Washington University in St. Louis, where he met his future wife, Zorita Rose (Zoe) Wise. Both graduated in 1948 and soon married.

The couple moved to Chicago, Illinois, where Zoe had urged Mikva to enroll at the University of Chicago Law School. He graduated in 1951 with a J.D. degree, having served as editor-in-chief of the University of Chicago Law Review. The couple eventually had three daughters: Mary Lane (b. 1953), an Illinois Appellate Court judge in Chicago; Laurie, who teaches at Northwestern University and is on the board of directors of the Legal Services Corporation; and Rachel, a rabbi and professor who teaches at the Chicago Theological Seminary.

== Political career ==
After graduation, Mikva clerked for Supreme Court Justice Sherman Minton. He also returned to Chicago and began practicing law, at a firm which became Goldberg, Devoe, Shadur & Mikva after he made partner. The firm handles labor, real estate, commercial and civil rights cases, as well as some criminal defense.

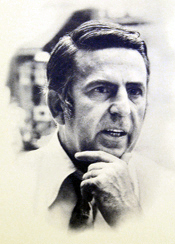
Mikva as a U.S. representative during the 1970s

Nonetheless, his early interest in Chicago clearly was politics:

One of the stories that is told about my start in politics is that on the way home from law school one night in 1948, I stopped by the ward headquarters in the ward where I lived. There was a street-front, and the name Timothy O'Sullivan, Ward Committeeman, was painted on the front window. I walked in and I said, "I'd like to volunteer to work for [Adlai] Stevenson and [Paul] Douglas." This quintessential Chicago ward committeeman took the cigar out of his mouth and glared at me and said, "Who sent you?" I said, "Nobody sent me." He put the cigar back in his mouth and he said, "We don't want nobody that nobody sent." This was the beginning of my political career in Chicago.

=== Illinois House of Representatives ===
He spent ten years, 1956 to 1966, in the Illinois House of Representatives. In the Illinois House, Mikva was part of the "Kosher Nostra", a group of independent, clean Democrats that included future United States Senator and Presidential candidate Paul Simon, future Illinois Comptroller and candidate for Governor Dawn Clark Netsch, and Representative Anthony Scariano.

=== U.S. House of Representatives ===
Mikva lost a primary challenge to machine-backed U.S. Representative Barratt O'Hara in 1966, but "reinvented himself" as a community activist, winning election to the United States Congress in 1968. He served in the U.S. House of Representatives from 1969 to 1973 and 1975 to 1979.

He first represented Illinois's 2nd District, which included the South Side's lakefront wards including Hyde Park, his residence and the University of Chicago. Both parties attempted to redistrict Mikva out of Congress. The redistricting for the 1972 elections put Hyde Park in the 1st District for the first time since 1903. This would have pitted Mikva against Democratic incumbent Ralph Metcalfe in a nearly 90% black district; moving to stay in the 2nd District would have matched him against Democratic incumbent Morgan F. Murphy, who had previously represented the 3rd District. Mikva instead moved to the North Shore's 10th District.

After he was defeated by Republican Samuel H. Young in 1972, he ran in the 1974 Democratic wave election and beat Young with 50.9% of the vote; his status was enhanced in the predominantly Republican, suburban district because he was viewed as critical of the Chicago Democratic establishment. In 1976, he was reelected by 201 votes against Young in a rematch that was one of the most expensive congressional races up to that time. When he defeated Republican State Representative John Porter by 650 votes in 1978, he joked to supporters that he had "won by a landslide." Porter won the seat after Mikva resigned to become a federal judge.

== Federal judicial service ==
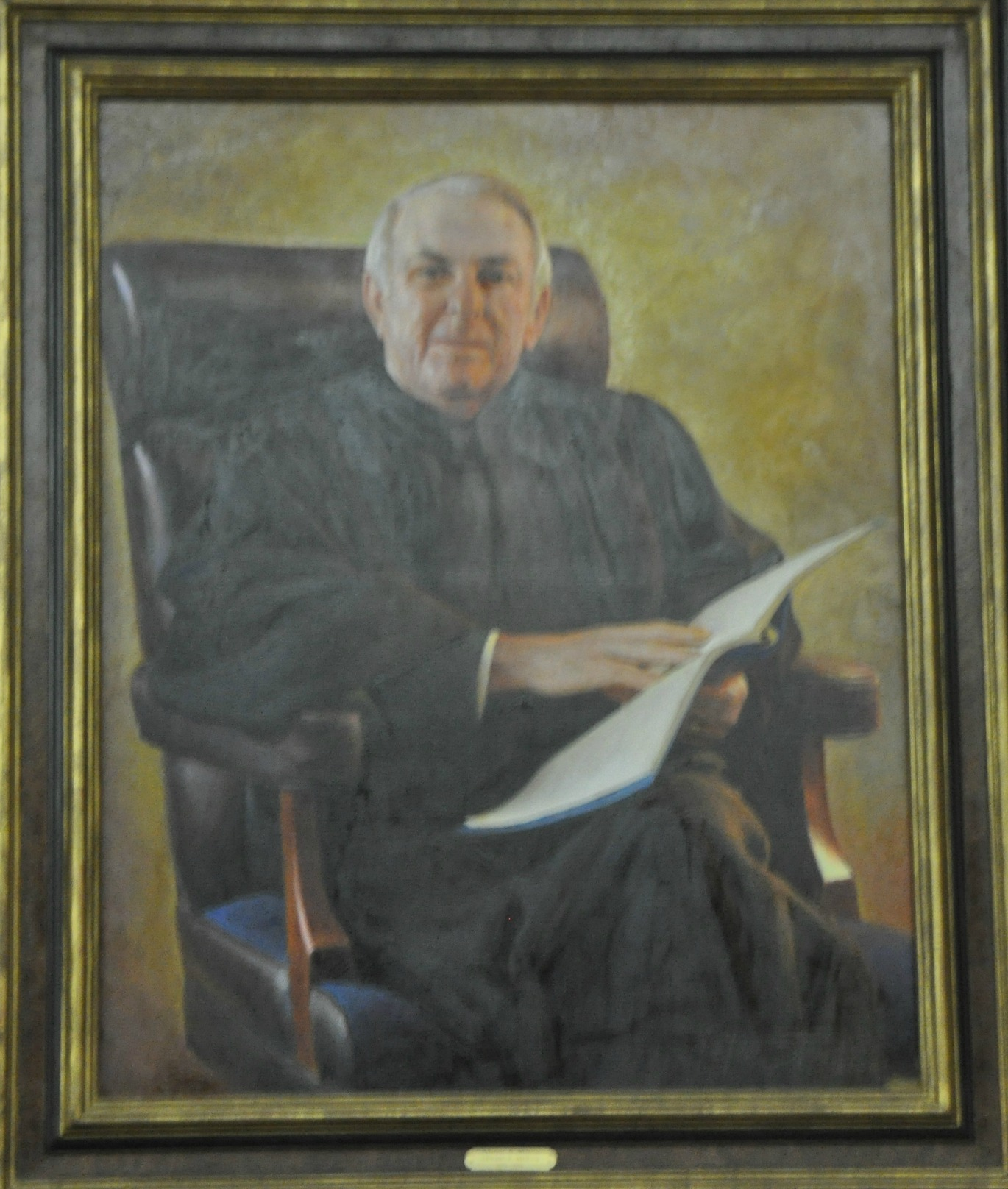
Mikva's official portrait as Chief Judge of the D.C. Circuit Court of Appeals

Mikva was nominated by President Jimmy Carter on May 29, 1979, to the United States Court of Appeals for the District of Columbia Circuit, to a new seat authorized by 92 Stat. 1629. Despite opposition from anti-gun control interests that spent over $1 million to oppose his nomination, Mikva was confirmed by the United States Senate on September 25, 1979 and received his commission on September 26, 1979. He served as Chief Judge from 1991 to 1994. His service terminated on September 19, 1994, due to retirement, after which he became White House Counsel to President Bill Clinton.

During his 15 years as judge, including four as Chief Judge, Mikva used his experience in the legislative branch as well as with the conservative Justice Minton to craft his opinions. Mikva's most controversial decisions struck down the Pentagon ban against gay people serving in the U.S. military (overturned on appeal by the circuit sitting en banc, but the ban was ultimately overturned by Executive Order), and - in 1982 - upheld regulation of air bags in automobiles.

In 1992, while serving as Chief Judge on the D.C. Circuit, Mikva appeared in the Kevin Kline comedy Dave as "Supreme Court Justice Abner J. Mikva," in a scene in which he administers the presidential oath of office to the Vice President (played by Ben Kingsley).

== Post-judicial career ==
Mikva taught law at Northwestern University and was White House Counsel under President Bill Clinton from 1994 to 1995, finding himself the oldest member of the White House team, and eventually resigning due to exhaustion. He then returned to the University of Chicago Law School, serving as the Schwarz Lecturer and the senior director of the Mandel Legal Aid Clinic. While at the university, Mikva came to better know future president Barack Obama, whom he mentored and supported politically. Obama awarded Mikva the Presidential Medal of Freedom on November 24, 2014. Mikva offered Obama a law clerk position in his judicial office after Obama graduated from Harvard Law School, but Obama declined. Future Obama appointee and United States Supreme Court Justice Elena Kagan did serve as one of Mikva's law clerks and was then a professor at the University of Chicago Law School. Mikva also encouraged Obama to listen to preachers to understand public speaking, "listen[ing] to patterns of speech, how to take people up the ladders. It's almost a Baptist tradition to make someone faint, and, by God, he's doing it now."

In 1997, Mikva served as the Wayne Morse Chair of Law and Politics, established in honor of the late former Senator, at the University of Oregon.

== Other pursuits ==
Mikva served as a mediator through JAMS, and was co-chairman of the Constitution Project's bipartisan Constitutional Amendments Committee. In November 2004, Mikva was an international election monitor of Ukraine's contested presidential election. In July 2006, Illinois Governor Rod Blagojevich named Mikva chair of the Illinois Human Rights Commission. In 2009, Illinois Governor Pat Quinn requested that Mikva lead a commission investigating the University of Illinois at Urbana–Champaign for admitting applicants (many of whom were not very well qualified) whose relatives or backers had connections to and had donated money to Illinois state lawmakers.

=== Mikva Challenge ===
Mikva and his wife Zoe started the Mikva Challenge in 1997. Mikva Challenge is a non-profit, non-partisan organization whose mission is to develop youth to be informed, empowered, and active citizens and community leaders who will promote a just and equitable society. Mikva Challenge has chapters in Chicago, Illinois, Washington, D.C., and Los Angeles, California, and partner sites spanning the country including Cobb County, Georgia, Wilmington, Delaware, Rochester, New York, New York City, New York, Louisville, Kentucky, Riverside, California, New Hampshire, Detroit, Michigan, and Macomb County, Michigan, Madison, Wisconsin, and Milwaukee, Wisconsin. The organization helps youth to expand their political desire by working as election judges, volunteering on campaigns, advising city officials, and creating local activism projects to improve their schools and communities. Their motto is "Democracy is a Verb!" As of 2020, Mikva Challenge reaches 100,000 youth annually in programs in over 3,000 schools across the country.

== Death ==
Mikva died under hospice care in Chicago, Illinois, from complications of bladder cancer on July 4, 2016, aged 90. He was also suffering from chronic obstructive pulmonary disease at the time of his death.

== Legacy and awards ==
Mikva's congressional and judicial papers are archived at the Abraham Lincoln Presidential Library in Springfield, Illinois. In 1998, Mikva received the Chicago History Museum's "Making History Award" for Distinction in Public Service. In 2016, Congress renamed the United States Post Office in downtown Evanston, Illinois, after Mikva, who had lived in Evanston and represented it as a congressional representative.

== See also ==
- List of Jewish American jurists
- List of Jewish members of the United States Congress
- List of law clerks for the third seat of the Supreme Court of the United States

U.S. House of Representatives
Preceded by Barratt O'Hara	Member of the U.S. House of Representatives from Illinois's 2nd congressional district 1969–1973	Succeeded by Morgan F. Murphy
Preceded by Samuel H. Young	Member of the U.S. House of Representatives from Illinois's 10th congressional district 1975–1979	Succeeded by John Porter
Legal offices
New seat	Judge of the United States Court of Appeals for the District of Columbia Circuit; 1979–1994	Succeeded by Merrick Garland
Preceded by Patricia Wald	Chief Judge of the United States Court of Appeals for the District of Columbia Circuit; 1991–1994	Succeeded by Harry T. Edwards
Preceded by Lloyd Cutler	White House Counsel; 1994–1995	Succeeded by Jack Quinn
