= Ken Stone =

Ken Stone may refer to:

- Ken Stone (American football) (born 1950), former professional American football safety
- Ken Stone (biblical scholar), author and biblical scholar
- Ken Stone (fighter) (born 1982), American mixed martial artist
