= Daniel Patte =

French-American biblical scholar and author

Daniel Patte (1939 – 2024) was a French-American biblical scholar and author. Patte was, since 2013, professor emeritus of Religious Studies, New Testament and Christianity at Vanderbilt University where he taught from 1971.

Patte studied in both European and American schools: following his Baccalauréat in Philosophy (Grenoble, 1958) he received a Baccalauréat en Théologie (1960) from the Faculté de Théologie Protestante, Montpellier, France, where he met his wife, Aline Teitelbaum; Licence en Théologie, (équivalent to Th.M., 1964) from the University of Geneva, Switzerland, and a Th.D. (1971) from the Jewish Christian Center at Chicago Theological Seminary.

As a biblical scholar and teacher in various settings around the world, Patte called for an ethics of biblical interpretation that involves acknowledging the contextual character of any interpretation of the Bible, as his numerous books and articles indicate. In the 1970s-1980s Patte pioneered structural criticism in biblical studies, then served two terms (1992–98) as the General Editor of Semeia, an Experimental Journal for Biblical Criticism of the Society of Biblical Literature.

Patte initiated and chaired programs of the Society of Biblical Literature, including on Semiotic and Exegesis, Romans Through History and Cultures, and, since 2007, Contextual Biblical Interpretation. With colleagues of the Society of Biblical Literature and of the American Academy of Religion involved in these programs, he envisioned and edited A Global Bible Commentary (2004) and The Cambridge Dictionary of Christianity (2010).

== Biography ==
As a child of a Huguenot family who was part of the underground striving to help Jewish families flee from the Nazi Holocaust, and as a missionary and teacher in the Republic of Congo (1964–66), from the start Patte's life, teaching and research have revolved around a theme of cross-cultural hermeneutics and “ethics of interpretation” of the Bible.

After reading the New Testament in terms of French existentialism (L’athéisme d’un Chrétien ou un Chrétien à l’écoute de Sartre, 1965, his MA thesis at the University of Geneva), he studied Jewish hermeneutics as expressed in early Midrash, Targum, and the Dead Sea Scrolls (Early Jewish Hermeneutics in Palestine, 1975, his Th.D. thesis at the Chicago Theological Seminary). His interests in hermeneutics, and then in theories of communication, structuralism, and semiotics (cf. his books on 'Structural Exegesis' and semiotics, two of them co-authored with his wife, Aline) led him to pay special attention to The Religious Dimensions of Biblical Texts and, in particular, those of Paul's letters (Paul's Faith and the Power of the Gospel: A Structural Introduction to the Pauline Letters) and Matthew (The Gospel according to Matthew: A Structural Commentary on Matthew's Faith).

His involvement as General Editor of Semeia with many very diverse colleagues – feminist, African-American, postcolonial biblical scholars from the US and biblical scholars from Africa (including from South Africa, Botswana, Kenya, Nigeria) and Asia (including from the Philippines, China, Korea, and India) – confronted him with the fact that any biblical interpretation (including the most rigorous critical exegesis) involves choosing one interpretation among several legitimate and plausible ones, and that this interpretive choice always has very concrete (often life and death) consequences. Therefore, any interpreter must assume moral responsibility for her/his interpretive choices (Ethics of Biblical Interpretation, 1995). These cross-cultural exchanges confirmed by structural semiotic theories (regarding the ways we make sense of texts) led him to a practice of 'Scriptural Criticism' – necessarily in collaboration with theologians, church historians, and other biblical scholars from around the world – that accounts for the analytical-exegetical, hermeneutical-theological, and contextual choices involved in any interpretation of the Bible.

The practice of Scriptural Criticism was first illustrated in Discipleship According to the Sermon on the Mount: Four Legitimate Readings, Four Plausible Views of Discipleship, and Their Relative Values (1996), in The Challenge of Discipleship: A Critical Study of the Sermon on the Mount as Scripture (1999), and in The Gospel of Matthew: A Contextual Introduction for Group Study (co-authored with Monya Stubbs, Justin Ukpong, and Revelation Velunta, 2003) and in A Global Bible Commentary (with seventy scholars from around the world, 2004).

With this approach, (A) he led a SBL Seminar (Romans Throughout History and Cultures, 1998–2011, involving 93 contributing scholars) in a study of the reception of Paul's letters to the Romans throughout history and in present-day cultures around the world; Patte and the theologian Cristina Grenholm co-edited a 10 volume book series, Romans through History and Cultures (2000–2013); (B) he edited (with José Severino Croatto, Nicole Wilkinson Duran, Teresa Okure, Archie Chi_Chung Lee) A Global Bible Commentary (2004) with contributions of seventy scholars from around the world; [2] (C) He was the General Editor of The Cambridge Dictionary of Christianity (2010), involving 828 contributing scholars from around the world) [3] that seeks to make understandable the complexity of present-day Christianity by clarifying the contextual character of Christian theological views, practices, and movements through history and cultures.

He is now compiling what he learned from all these in his massive multivolume project Romans: Three Exegetical Interpretations and the History of Reception (Volume 1 [2018] on Romans 1:1-32 and much methodological discussion is 531 page-long).

== Biblical interpretation ==
Patte's lifelong research and teaching crystallized in the emphasis on contextual biblical interpretations. He pioneered this approach in critical biblical studies, making a significant impact not only on biblical scholarship but also on the laity and practical theology. This approach is concerned with the diversity of interpretations, their on-going conflicts, and with criteria for assessing the ethical value of particular interpretations. When one acknowledges that any interpretation necessarily includes three kinds of interpretive moves – a textual choice (foregrounding an aspect of the text, rather than others), a theological/hermeneutical choice (privileging certain connotations of key concepts), and contextual choices (allowing specific contextual concerns to frame one's reading) – any interpreter is faced with a plurality of reading possibilities, and therefore with ethical responsibility. Consequently, Patte's pedagogy takes the form of round-table discussions as a procedure for discerning the relative value of different interpretations and for calling for a critical, communal evaluation of each and every interpretation. Each interpreter needs to assume the ethical responsibility for the effect that her/his choice of an interpretation has for people in her/his narrow or broader context. Far from promoting a naïve relativism (any reading goes) Patte advocates critically engaged interpretations that acknowledge the cultural and ethical value of interpretations.

== Selected bibliography ==
- L'Athéisme d'un Chrétien ou un Chrétien à l'écoute de Sartre. Nouvelles Editions Latines: Paris, 1965.
- Early Jewish Hermeneutic in Palestine. Missoula: Scholars Press. 1975.
- What Is Structural Exegesis? Philadelphia: Fortress Press, 1975.
- Structural Exegesis from Theory to Practice. Exegesis of Mark 15 and 16. Philadelphia: Fortress Press (with Aline Patte). 1978.
- Pour une exégèse structurale. Paris: Le Seuil, 1978 (with Aline Patte).
- Paul's Faith and the Power of the Gospel. Philadelphia: Fortress Press. 1983.
- Paulo, Sua Fé e a Força do Evangelo. São Paulo: Ediçoes Paulinas. 1987.
- Paul, Sa Foi, et la Puissance de l'Evangile. Paris: Le Cerf, 1985.
- Preaching Paul. Philadelphia: Fortress Press. 1984.
- The Gospel according to Matthew: A Structural Commentary on Matthew's Faith. Philadelphia: Fortress Press. 1987.
- Structural Exegesis for New Testament Critics. Minneapolis: Fortress Press. 1990.
- The Religious Dimensions of Biblical Texts: Greimas's Structural Semiotics and Biblical Exegesis. Semeia Studies Series. Atlanta: Society of Biblical Literature, 1990.
- Ethics of Biblical Interpretation: A Reevaluation. Louisville, KY: Westminster John Knox, 1995.
- Discipleship According to the Sermon on the Mount: Four Legitimate Readings, Four Plausible Views of Discipleship, and Their Relative Values. Harrisburg, PA: Trinity Press International. 1996.
- The Challenge of Discipleship: A Critical Study of the Sermon on the Mount as Scripture. Harrisburg, PA: Trinity Press International, 1999 (reprinted, London & New York: T & T Clark International).
- The Gospel of Matthew: A Contextual Introduction for Group Study. (with Monya Stubbs, Justin Ukpong, Revelation Velunta). Nashville: Abingdon. 2003.
- Romans: Three Exegetical Interpretations and the History of Reception. Volume 1: Romans 1:1-32. London, New York: Bloomsbury T&T Clark. 2018.

== Edited books ==
- Reading Israel in Romans: Legitimacy and Plausibility of Divergent Interpretations. (with Cristina Grenholm), Romans Through History and Cultures Series Vol. 1. Harrisburg, PA: Trinity Press International, 2000; re-printed, London & New York: T & T Clark International.
- Engaging Augustine on Romans: Self, Context, and Theology in Interpretation. (with Eugene TeSelle) Romans Through History and Cultures Series, Vol. 2. Harrisburg, PA: Trinity Press International, 2002; re-printed, London & New York: T & T Clark International.
- Gender, Tradition and Romans. Shared Ground, Uncertain Borders. Vol. 5, Romans Through History and Cultures. London & New York: T & T Clark International, 2005 (with Cristina Grenholm).
- The Greek Fathers' and Eastern Orthodox Interpretations of Romans. Vol. 9, Romans Through History and Cultures. London & New York: T & T Clark International, 2005 (with Vasile Mihoc).
- Modern Interpretations of Romans Romans Through History and Cultures. Vol, 10, Romans Through History and Cultures, London & New York: T & T Clark International, (forthcoming) (with Cristina Grenholm).
- A Global Biblical Commentary. Nashville: Abingdon, 2004.
- The Cambridge Dictionary of Christianity. Cambridge, U.K. and New York: Cambridge University Press, 2010. Bibliography online
