= Yoshio Fukuyama =

American theologian

Yoshio Fukuyama (福山 喜雄, Fukuyama Yoshio; April 29, 1921 - April 3, 1995) was an American theologian and writer. He held a doctorate in sociology from the University of Chicago and was a faculty member of the Chicago Theological Seminary. He is credited with beginning the scholarly discussion on how to define and measure religious commitment. Some of his works include The ministry in transition: a case study of theological education (Pennsylvania State University Press, 1972) and The fragmented layman; an empirical study of lay attitudes (Pilgrim Press, 1970, co-author). Some of his academic roles performed during his career include Director of Research for the United Church of Christ, chair of the membership committee for the Society for the Scientific Study of Religion. He is the father of political scientist Francis Fukuyama.

== Other works ==
- "Social Research and the Churches", Review of Religious Research, Volume 28, Issue 1, September, 1986
- "The Major Dimensions of Church Membership", Review of Religious Research, Volume 2, pages 154–161, 1961
- Papers associated with Yoshio Fukuyama at Chicago Theological Seminary
