= John W. de Gruchy =

South African theologian (born 1939)

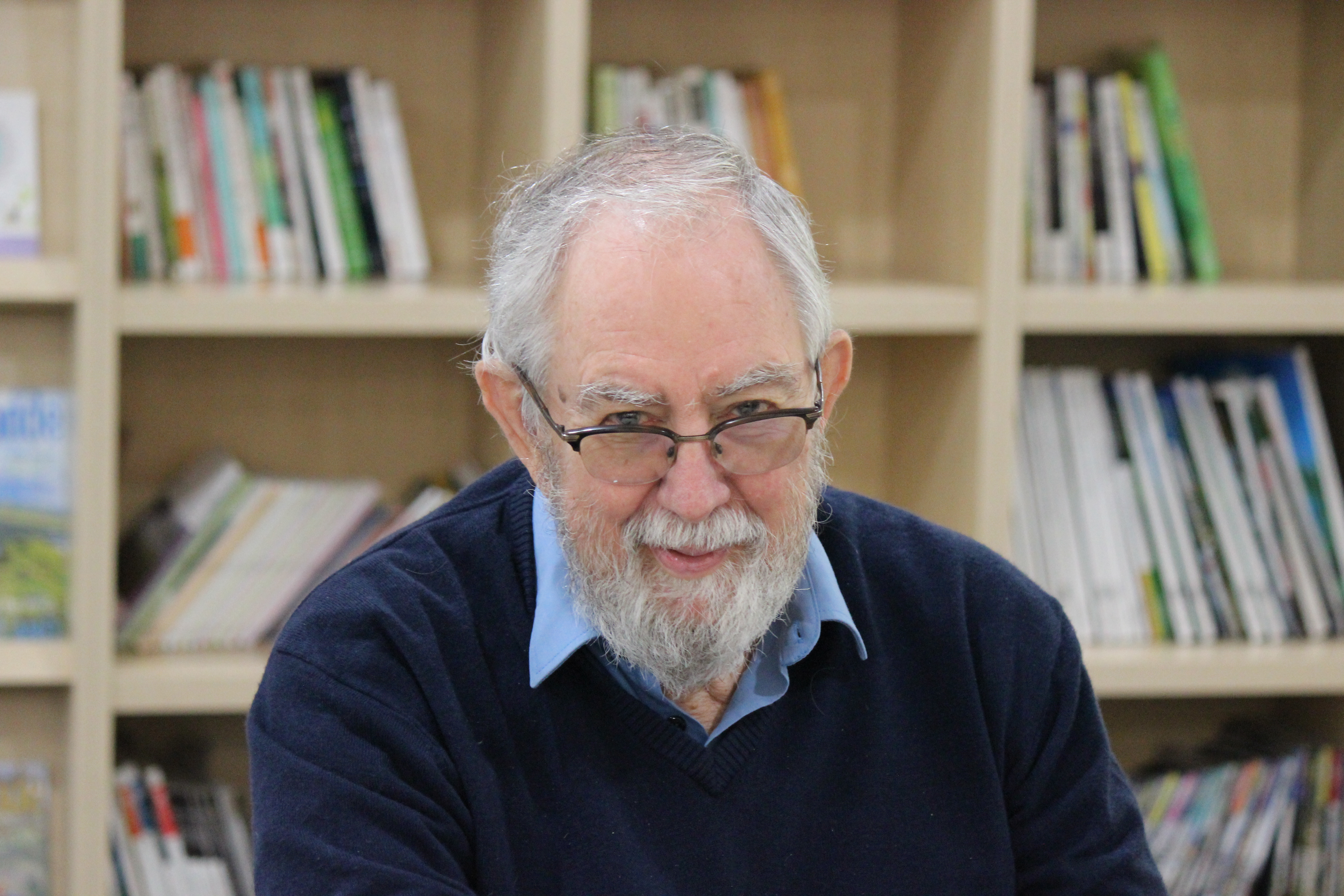
- Born: 18 March 1939 (age 87); Pretoria, South Africa

Academic background
- Education: University of Cape Town, Rhodes University, Chicago Theological Seminary, University of Chicago

Academic work
- Discipline: Theologian
- Institutions: University of Cape Town, University of Stellenbosch

John W. de Gruchy (born 18 March 1939) is a Christian theologian known for his work resisting apartheid. He is presently Emeritus Professor at the University of Cape Town and Extraordinary Professor at the University of Stellenbosch.

== Biography ==
A native of Pretoria, South Africa, de Gruchy studied at the University of Cape Town, Rhodes University, Chicago Theological Seminary and the University of Chicago. He has two doctorates, one in theology and another in the social sciences, and a number of honorary doctorates.

For many years, he was Robert Selby Taylor Professor of Christian Studies at University of Cape Town. He remains an emeritus professor at the University of Cape Town and holds a post as an extraordinary professor at the University of Stellenbosch. A feschrift was published in his honor in 2002.

Some of his earliest works were written in the midst of apartheid in South Africa, speaking out against the legislation and engaging the theology of Dietrich Bonhoeffer to argue for the liberation of the oppressed. After apartheid legislation was abolished in 1991, de Gruchy wrote a number of works speaking about the theological role of art in society and advocating for a theology of reconciliation.

== Works ==
- de Gruchy, John W. (1979). The Church Struggle in South Africa. Grand Rapids, MI: William B. Eerdmans. ISBN 978-0-8028-1786-0.
- ——— (1984). Bonhoeffer and South Africa: Theology in Dialogue. W.B. Eerdmans. ISBN 978-0-8028-0042-8.
- ——— (2001). Christianity, Art and Transformation: Theological Aesthetics in the Struggle for Justice. Cambridge University Press. ISBN 978-0-521-77205-1.
- ——— (2002). Reconciliation: Restoring Justice. Fortress Press. ISBN 978-1-4514-1161-4.
- ——— (2006). Confessions of a Christian Humanist. Fortress Press. ISBN 978-0-8006-3824-5.
- ——— (2006). Being Human: Confessions of a Christian Humanist. SCM. ISBN 978-0-334-02979-3.
- ——— (2013). John Calvin: Christian Humanist and Evangelical Reformer. Wipf and Stock. ISBN 978-1-62032-773-9.
- ——— (2013). Led Into Mystery: Faith Seeking Answers in Life and Death. Hymns Ancient and Modern Ltd. ISBN 978-0-334-04736-0.
- ——— (2014). A theological odyssey: My life in writing. AFRICAN SUN MeDIA. ISBN 978-1-920689-43-8.
- Everett, William J.; ——— (2014). Sawdust and Soul: A Conversation about Woodworking and Spirituality. Wipf and Stock. ISBN 978-1-63087-737-8.

== See also ==
- Reformed theology
