= Herman Schaalman =

Reform rabbi

- Title: Rabbi

Personal life
- Born: Herman Ezra Schaalman; April 1916 Munich, Germany
- Died: January 2017 (aged 100) Chicago, Illinois
- Spouse: Lotte Schaalman
- Children: Michael and Susan

Religious life
- Religion: Judaism

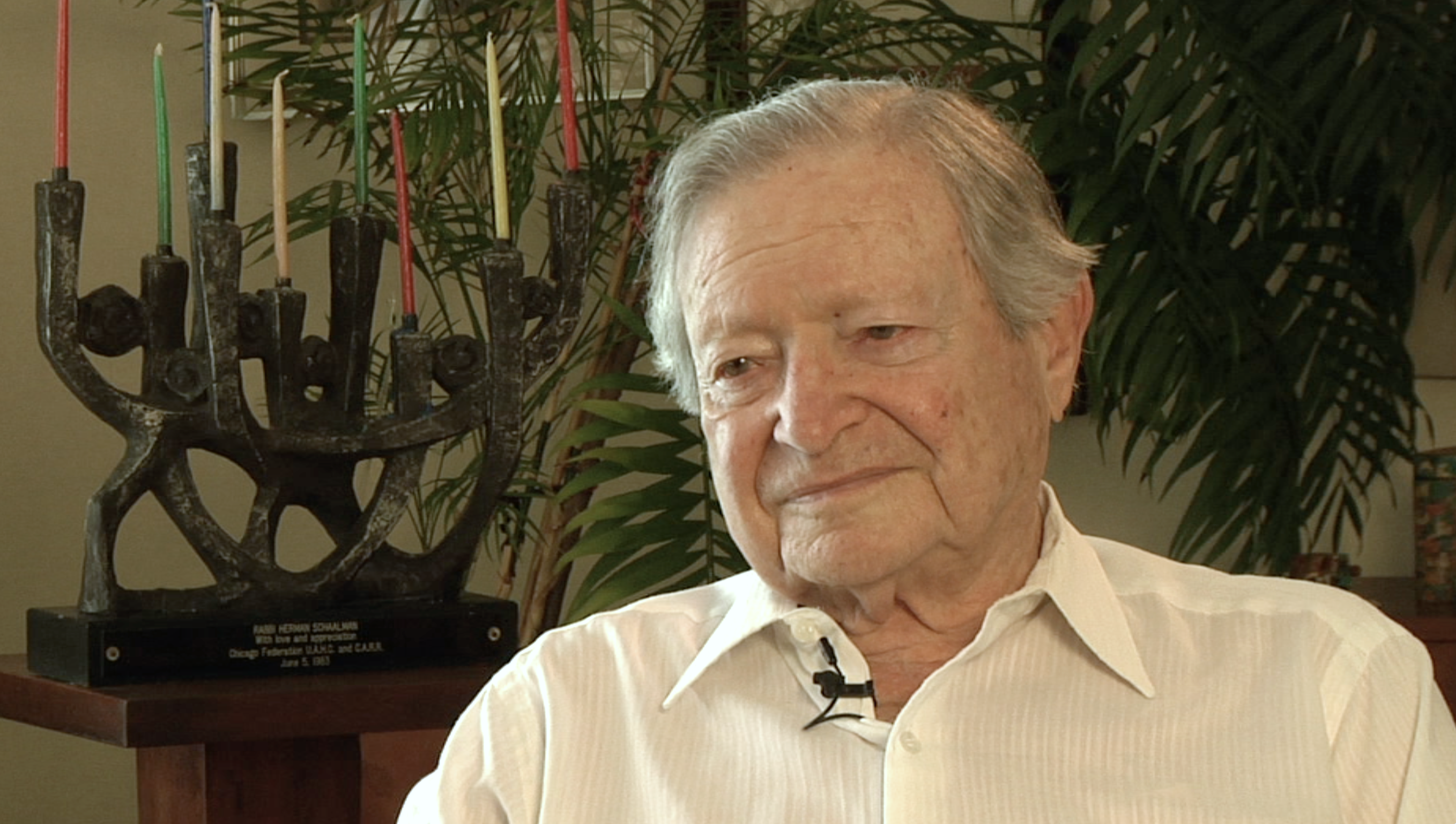

Herman Ezra Schaalman (April 1916 – January 2017) was a Reform rabbi.

== Early life and education ==
Herman Ezra Schaalman was born on April 28, 1916, in Munich, Germany. His father, a veteran of WWI who fought at the Battle of Verdun, was a mathematics and physics professor. His mother was from a rabbinic family.

As a Jewish child in a predominantly Roman Catholic city, Schaalman experienced instances of antisemitism, intolerance, and exclusion. For example, in a 2005 interview with U.S. Catholic, Schaalman recalled the memory of being beaten up by his own friends when he was seven or eight years old, solely because he was Jewish.

In 1935, Schaalman evaded the dangers of the Nazi party and, consequently, the eventual dangers of the Holocaust when he was given a scholarship to Hebrew Union College, along with four other students. Schaalman spent the next six years studying there and was ordained in 1941. During this time, Schaalman also studied at the University of Cincinnati and earned his B.A. and M.A. in 1937.

== Career ==
Schaalman's first placement was in Cedar Rapids, Iowa, at Temple Judah. He served at this location from 1941 to 1949. At the same time, Schaalman also taught at Coe College and Cornell College. From 1949 to 1951, Schaalman served as the director of the Chicago Federation of the Union of American Hebrew Congregations. This position led him to establish and become the first director of a camp for kids called the Olin-Sang Ruby Union Institute, located in Wisconsin.

In 1956, Schaalman went to Emanuel Congregation of Chicago to serve as their Senior Rabbi. This position lasted for more than thirty years, until he retired in 1986, yet still continued as rabbi emeritus until his death.

During his time as a rabbi, Schaalman also served in many other positions. He was president of the Central Conference of American Rabbis from 1981 to 1983. He served on the board of directors of the Jewish Federation of Metropolitan Chicago alongside multiple committees, including the Ethics Committee and the Committee of Patrilineal Decent, among others.

Schaalman is also widely known for his inter-religious activism. He often wrote and spoke about the importance of dialogue between religions, specifically Christians and Jews. He believed constructive dialogues, and even inter-religious friendships, could make the world a better place. This was greatly exemplified when he performed a memorial service in a Roman Catholic cathedral for Cardinal Joseph Bernardin in 1996, with whom he had been very close friends. Schaalman and many others considered this act, a rabbi performing a religious act in a church, to be among the first, if not only, of its kind.

== Awards and honors ==
Herman Schaalman was the recipient of numerous honors and awards throughout his life.

In 1966, he was awarded an honorary degree of doctor of divinity from Hebrew Union College–Jewish Institute of Religion.

In 1995, the Chicago Archdiocese bestowed upon Schaalman a Larueante in Ecumenicism. The Immigrants' Service League also named him one of the outstanding foreign-born citizens of Chicago for all of his service work. Schaalman was also inducted into the Hall of Fame of Jewish Community Centers.

In 1999, Schaalman was given the Julius Rosenwald Medallion by the Jewish Federation of Metropolitan Chicago.

In 2000, Schaalman acquired many honors and awards, among them being an honorary doctorate in ministry from the Catholic Theological Union at Chicago, the Graham Taylor Award and the creation of an award named after him from the Chicago Theological Seminary.

In 2001, Schaalman acquired another honorary doctorate from the Spertus Institute of Judaic Studies.

In 2002, Schaalman was awarded the Lincoln Medal, which is the highest recognition anyone can receive from the state of Illinois.

In 2004, the Garrett – Evangelical Theological Institute at Northwestern University in Evanston, Illinois, gave him another honorary degree. This same year, Schaalman was also given the Luminary Senior Award by the city of Chicago and was inducted into the Chicago Senior Citizens Hall of Fame. Near the latter part of 2004, the city of Chicago dedicated a park in his honor.

== Writings ==
Herman Schaalman is the author of multiple articles, the editor of one book, and the author of one book. Some of the writings he has contributed to are listed below.

- Schaalman, Herman E. "An Agenda for Reform Judaism in Israel." Judaism, vol. 31, no. 4, Fall82, p. 438. ISSN 0022-5762
- Schaalman, Herman E. (Herman Ezra). "Creation as a Divine-Human Collaboration." Wisdom of Creation, Liturgical Press, 2004. ISBN 0814651224
- Schaalman, Herman E. "History and Halakhah Are Related and Inseparable." Judaism, vol. 34, no. 1, Winter85, p. 74. ISSN 0022-5762
- Schaalman, Herman E. (Herman Ezra). "Judaic Spirituality." Chicago Studies, vol. 36, Apr. 1997, pp. 39–46. ISSN 0009-3718
- Preaching Biblical Texts: Expositions by Jewish and Christian Scholars. Eerdmans, 1995.
- Schaalman, Herman E. (Herman Ezra). "Religious Pluralism - a Jewish View." Chicago Theological Seminary Register, vol. 76, no. 1, 1986, pp. 29–35. ISSN 0739-5124
- Schaalman, Herman E. "The Binding of Isaac." Preaching Biblical Texts, Eerdmans, 1995, pp. 36–45.
- Schaalman, Herman E. (Herman Ezra). "What's in a Name." The Covenant Quarterly, vol. 55, no. 2-3, May 1997, pp. 69–74. ISSN 0361-0934
- Schaalman, Herman E. (Herman Ezra), Hineni: Here I Am Ktav Pub & Distributors Inc., April 2007, ISBN 978-0881259544

== Personal life ==
Herman Schaalman married his wife, Lotte Schaalman, in 1941 after being ordained. They were married almost 76 years, until Lotte died at the age of 102 in January 2017.

The Schaalmans had two children, Michael and Susan, and multiple grandchildren and great-grandchildren.
