= Alden E. Matthews =

- Born: September 10, 1921; Chicago, Illinois, United States
- Died: October 8, 2014 (aged 93); Palm Harbor, Florida, United States
- Other name: 麻安德
- Occupation: Christian missionary
- Spouses: Derrith Lovell (m. 1944; died 1986) Sallie Rennie Parks (m. 1996)
- Children: 3
- Parent(s): Harold Shepard Matthews; Grace Waters Matthews

Alden Ewart Matthews (Chinese: 麻安德; pinyin: Má Āndé; September 10, 1921 – October 8, 2014) was a Congregationalist missionary to China and Japan.

== Life ==
Matthews was born in Chicago in 1921. In 1922, he came to North China with his missionary parents, Harold Shepard (麻海如) and Grace Waters Matthews, who were under the auspices of the American Board of Commissioners for Foreign Missions. He acquired Mandarin Chinese as his first language and spent his childhood in Beijing, Dezhou of Shandong Province, Tianjin, and Fenzhou of Shanxi Province.

Matthews attended North China American School and in 1937 he returned to the United States to receive higher education. Later he graduated from Grinnell College, in Grinnell, Iowa, and Chicago Theological Seminary. As a young man, he served in the Navy and Naval Reserve as a chaplain. On June 15, 1944, he married Derrith Jane Lovell, his college classmate, and in 1946 their first child was born.

Matthews returned to China in 1947 along with his wife and baby daughter. He was assigned to Fuzhou to serve in the Mid-Fujian Synod of the Church of Christ in China (中华基督教会闽中协会). At first he worked in Changle, where his job was to help strengthen the churches in that area. In 1948, he moved to the West Gate of Fuzhou city to teach agricultural engineering in Union High School. In 1949 he again moved to the American Board mission compound near the South Gate, where he worked as the liaison with the Congregational Church in America with the title Corresponding Secretary. During that time his second daughter was born at Union Hospital, Fuzhou. Situations became difficult when Fuzhou was taken over by the Communist regime in August 1949. However, Matthews chose to stay to continue the mission work, but it wasn't long before he realized that the presence of the foreign missionaries had been counter-productive. In December, 1950, he and Derrith and their two daughters had to leave China.

After a one-year study in Union Theological Seminary, New York, Matthews was sent to Japan in 1952 to do a variety of work including teaching and administration in the United Church of Christ in Japan. His third child was born there. During the long period in Japan he was a member of the League of Women Voters, a Rotarian Emeritus, and member of Crystal Beach Community Church, as well as serving on many prestigious boards in Japan. His wife Derrith died of cancer on January 17, 1986, and was buried in Aoyama Cemetery in Tokyo. On November 1, 1986, Matthews officially retired from United Church Board for World Ministries, but lived in Japan until 1995.

In 1996 Matthews married again to Sallie Parks, a lady he met in Japan in 1986, who was then also working there. In 2007, Matthews published his autobiography My Three Worlds (ISBN 9781434318459), where he tells his inspiring stories in China, America, and Japan.

Matthews spent his last two decades in Palm Harbor, Florida, with his wife Sallie. He died of respiratory failure on the early morning of October 8, 2014.
