= Graham Taylor (theologian) =

Graham Taylor (May 2, 1851 – September 26, 1938) was a minister, social reformer, Chicago Theological Seminary faculty member, and founder of Chicago Commons Settlement House.

== Early life and education ==
Graham Taylor was born in Schenectady, New York on May 2, 1851, the second son of Dutch-reformed minister William James Romeyn Taylor and Katherine (nee Cowenhoven) Taylor. After graduating from Rutgers College, he entered the Theological Seminary of the Reformed Church in America (now, New Brunswick Theological Seminary) in New Brunswick, New Jersey, in 1870.

== Career ==
Three years later, he accepted the pastorate of a small church in Hopewell, New York, where he stayed for seven years.

In 1880, he moved to Hartford, Connecticut, to be the pastor of the Fourth Congregational Church. It was there that Taylor first experienced working with the poor and immigrant communities, and where he saw firsthand the effects of alcoholism, prostitution, and vice on society. His experiences led him toward to a more liberal social gospel theology and outlook.

Taylor was invited to teach at the Chicago Theological Seminary, so in 1892, he and his family moved to Chicago. In 1894 Taylor founded the Chicago Commons Settlement, a settlement house located at the corner of Union Street and Milwaukee Avenue, in Chicago's 17th Ward. When the work of the settlement outgrew the building, a new Commons building was constructed on the corner of Grand and Morgan Streets.

In 1894, Taylor, Jane Addams and Mary McDowell established the Chicago Federation of Settlements, a forerunner of the National Federation of Settlements. In 1914, Taylor was elected president of the National Conference of Charities and Correction; and in 1917, president of National Federation of Settlements. In 1921 Taylor retired from active administration of the Commons, though he remained active in Commons concerns and issues.

== Death ==
Taylor died in his sleep on September 26, 1938.

== Selected works ==
- Books for Beginners In the Study of Christian Sociology and Social Economics suggested by Graham Taylor (1895)
- Chicago Commons: A Social Center for Civic Co-operation (1904)
- Religion in Social Action (1913)
- Basis for Social Evangelism with Rural Applications (1914)
- Pioneering On Social Frontiers (1930)
- Chicago Commons Through Forty Years (1936)
