= Fred Eastman =

American Presbyterian theologian (1886-1963)

- Born: July 11, 1886; Lima, Ohio, U.S.
- Died: April 2, 1963 (aged 76); Claremont, California, U.S.
- Education: Wooster College (BA); Columbia University; Union Theological Seminary
- Occupations: Theologian; teacher; playwright; author; journalist
- Spouse: Lilla Frances Morse (m. 1914)
- Children: 2

Elmer Fred Eastman (July 11, 1886 – April 2, 1963) was an American Presbyterian theologian, professor, author, playwright, lecturer and journalist. He was the managing editor of the periodical, Christian Work, and a contributing editor to The Christian Century. For the final 26 years of his career he was professor of Biography, Literature and Drama at the Chicago Theological Seminary.

== Early life and career ==
A native of Lima, Ohio, Eastman was one of four children born to attorney Robert C. Eastman and Lealine Berry. He attended Lima High School, Wooster University, Union Theological Seminary and Columbia University.

On May 22, 1911, at Brooklyn's Central Presbyterian Church, in what The Brooklyn Eagle later dubbed "one of the longest drawn-out meetings of the Presbytery ever held," Eastman, together with three similarly inclined candidates, became a fully ordained Presbyterian minister despite his avowed agnosticism. From 1919 to 1924, he was director of education for the Presbyterian National Board of Home Missions. In March 1926, Eastman was appointed chair of Chicago Theological Seminary's newly established department of religious literature and drama, a post he held until his retirement in 1952.

In May 1950, in the wake of polls expressing mass approval of U.S. bombing of Hiroshima and Nagasaki, Eastman, in a published statement endorsed and later disseminated by the Claremont Wider Quaker Fellowship, likened threatened deployment of the hydrogen bomb to Herod's Slaughter of the Innocents.

== Personal life and death ==
On August 4, 1914, in St. Johnsbury, Vermont, Eastman, then Pastor of the Reformed Church of Locust Valley, Long Island, married fellow UTS alumnus Lilla Frances Morse, in a ceremony held in his bride's home and conducted by her brother, the Rev. Charles Morse. The marriage produced two sons.

On April 2, 1963, at age 76, Eastman died at Pilgrim Place, a retirement community in Claremont, California, survived by his wife and sons.

== Selected works ==
Unless otherwise indicated, all information derived from Open Library and/or Log College Press.

=== Books ===
- Fear God in Your Own Village. New York: Henry Holt and Company. 1918.
- Playing Square With Tomorrow. New York: Council of Women for Home Missions, Missionary Education Movement. 1921.
- Unfinished Business of the Presbyterian Church in America. Philadelphia: The Westminster Press. 1921.
- Modern Religious Dramas. New York: Henry Holt and Company. 1928. (compiled and edited).
- Religion and Drama: Friends or Enemies?: Being a brief account of their historical connection and their present relation. New York: The Century Company. 1930.
- Drama in the Church: A manual of religious drama production. New York: Samuel French. 1933
- Ten One-Act Plays. Chicago: Willett, Clark and Company. 1937.
- Books That Have Shaped the World. Chicago: American Library Association. 1937.
- Men of Power Vol. I.. Nashvillle: Cokesbury Press. 1938.
- Men of Power Vol. II. Nashvillle: Cokesbury Press. 1938.
- Men of Power Vol. III. Nashvillle: Cokesbury Press. 1939.
- Men of Power Vol. IV. Nashvillle: Cokesbury Press. 1939.
- Men of Power Vol. V. Nashvillle: Cokesbury Press. 1940.
- Christ in the Drama. New York; MacMillan. 1947.
- Writing the One-act Religious Play.. 1948.

=== Plays ===
- Bread: a play in one act. 1925
- The Triumph of the Defeated. 1929.
- The Tinker: a play in three acts. 1930.
- Courtship: a comedy in one act. 1930.
- America on Trial: a pageant play in one act. 1932.
- The Great Choice: (an incident of the next war) a play in one act. 1932.
- Our Lean Years: a play in one act. 1933.
- The Doctor Decides: a play in one act. 1934.
- The Examination: a play in one act. 1937.
- American Saint of Democacy: a play in one act. 1942.
- Prexy and Son: a play in three acts. 1942.
- An American Family. 1951.
- Satan Walks Again. 1961.
