= Clarence Beckwith =

American theologian and writer

Clarence Augustine Beckwith (Charlemont, Massachusetts, July 21, 1849 – 1931) was an American theologian and writer. He was a teacher at the United Church of Christ's Chicago Theological Seminary from 1905. He lived at Little Deer Isle, Maine.

Beckwith's best known work was The Idea of God, published in 1922. It was positively reviewed by Douglas Clyde Macintosh.

== Selected publications ==
- contributions to The New Schaff-Herzog Encyclopedia of Religious Knowledge 1883 as "C. A. B."
- Realities of Christian Theology (1906)
- The Idea of God: Historical, Critical, Constructive (1922)
