= Larry Pickens =

The Rev. Dr. Larry D. Pickens is a graduate of North Park University and holds a master of theology degree and master of divinity degree from Garrett-Evangelical Theological Seminary, a doctorate in ministry from Chicago Theological Seminary, and a Juris Doctor from DePaul University College of Law. Larry is the executive director of the Pennsylvania Council of Churches. Larry is the former general secretary of the General Commission on Christian Unity and Interreligious Concerns of the United Methodist Church. During his tenure as the ecumenical staff officer these significant events took place. Pickens served as the Ecumenical Director of The Lehigh Conference of Churches in Allentown, Pennsylvania from 2014-20.

Larry has engaged in and developed numerous ecumenical and interfaith events:

- Organized and Moderated a major United Methodist Consultation on the Global Nature of the Church, This was a forum designed to help the United Methodist Church address global and ecumenical issues in Africa, The United States, Europe, the Philippines and Latin America Norcross, Georgia
- Organized and led a United Methodist Delegation to the Vatican and the Pontifical Council for Promoting Christian Unity
- Organized and led a United Methodist Delegation to Havana, Cuba for an Ecumenical Visit. This including an effort to mediate an existing dispute between the Methodist Church in Cuba and the Presbyterian Church regarding the status of the Theological School at Matanzas. This was also an opportunity for us to meet with ecumenical representatives from Cuba an address issues facing the United States and
- Organized Training Event for United Methodists attending the 9th Assembly of the World Council of Council of Churches, Chicago, Illinois- This was a training opportunity designed to prepare United Methodist delegates for the intricacies of the Assembly process. It was also an overview of the issues that we would encounter at the Assembly.
- Led the agency through a process of strategic planning as we charted a course for the ecumenical and interfaith ministry of the United Methodist Church. This process involved an environmental scan and mapping for the future ecumenical agenda of the United Methodist Church. Our aim was to project the direction of the agency as we looked forward 5–10 years.
- Created the Bridge Builder Award in honor of the late Bishop James K Mathews. The first award was given to President Ellen Johnson Sirleaf at the 2008 General Conference in Ft. Worth, Texas

== Ecumenical and connectional involvement ==
=== Connectional and ecumenical church experiences ===
- Delegate (First Alternate) to The General Conference of The United Methodist Church, Fort Worth, Texas- 2008
- Delegate to The Jurisdictional Conference of The United Methodist Church, Grand Rapids, Michigan- 2008
- Board Member of Oikocredit- 2007
- Participant in Ecumenical Peace Conference, Savu Savu, Fiji- 2007
- Organized and Moderated a Major Consultation on the Global Nature of the Church, Norcross, Georgia- 2007*
- World Council of Churches, United Methodist Representative to the Joint Consultative Commission- 2007–Present
- World Council of Churches, Participant in Consultation on the Ecumenical Movement in the 21st Century in Geneva, Switzerland- 2006
- Member of the Executive Committee of the World Council of Churches- 2006–Present
- Member of the Central Committee of the World Council of Churches- 2006–Present
- Delegate to the World Methodist Conference, Seoul, Korea- 2006
- Organized and led a United Methodist Delegation to the Vatican and the Pontifical Council for Promoting Christian Unity- 2006
- Organized and led a United Methodist Delegation to Havana, Cuba for an Ecumenical Visit- 2006
- Organized Training Event for United Methodists Attending the 9th Assembly of the World Council of Churches, Chicago, Illinois- 2005
- Delegate to the Assembly on World Mission and Evangelism, Athens, Greece 2005
- Coordinating Council Member of Churches Uniting in Christ- 2005-2007
- World Council of Churches, Delegate to the 9th Assembly in Porto Alegre, Brazil- 2005
- World Council of Churches, Participant in the Ecumenical Officers Forum- 2004-2006
- National Council of Churches of Christ of the USA, Delegate General Assembly- 2004-2007
- National Council of Churches of Christ of the USA, Governing Board Member- 2004-2007
- The Committee to Study the Relationship between the United Methodist Church and the Affiliated Autonomous Churches of Latin America and the Caribbean- 2004-2008
- The Connectional Table- United Methodist Church- 2004-2008
- The Judicial Council- United Methodist Church- 2000-2004
- Delegate to the General Conference of The United Methodist Church, Cleveland, Ohio- 2000
- Delegate to the Jurisdictional Conference of The United Methodist Church, Madison, Wisconsin- 2000
- Northern Illinois Committee on Investigation- 1996-1999
- People to People, Delegate to International Human Rights Conference, Havana, Cuba- 1998
- Delegate to the People to People Seminar on the Legal System of South Africa- 1997
- Delegate to the World Methodist Conference, Singapore- 1991
- Delegate to the Seventh Assembly of the World Council of Churches, Canberra, Australia- 1991
- Delegate to the Assembly on World Mission and Evangelism, San Antonio- 1987
- Northern Illinois Board of Ordained Ministry- 1988-1993
- National Black Methodists for Church Renewal- 1986–Present
- Delegate to the World Methodist Conference, Nairobi, Kenya- 1985,

=== Community service ===
- The Human Relations Board-The City of Elgin, Illinois- 2001-2004
- Marcy Newberry Association, Board of Directors- 1988-1993
- Community Block Grant Advisory Board-The City of Chicago, Illinois-1988-1995

=== Other pastoral roles ===
- Southlawn United Methodist Church, Chicago, IL
- Memorial United Methodist Church, White Plains, NY
- Northbrook United Methodist Church, Northbrook Illinois, Senior Pastor
- General Commission on Christian Unity and Interreligious Concerns, New York, New York, General Secretary
- First United Methodist Church, Elgin, Illinois, Senior Pastor
- Maple Park United Methodist Church, Chicago, Illinois, Senior Pastor
- United States Trustee, Chicago, Illinois, Extern
- Gorham United Methodist Church, Chicago, Illinois, Senior Pastor
- St. Mark United Methodist Church, Chicago, Illinois, Associate Pastor

== Family ==
Pickens and his wife, Debra, have a daughter, Jessica.
