= Samuel H. Young =

American politician

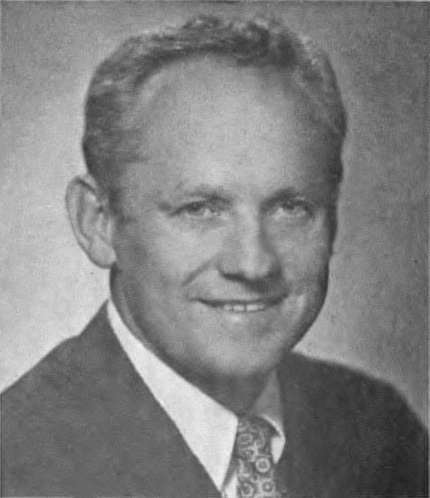

Member of the U.S. House of Representatives from Illinois's 10th district
- In office January 3, 1973 – January 3, 1975
- Preceded by: Phil Crane (redistricting)
- Succeeded by: Abner Mikva

Personal details
- Born: Samuel Hollingsworth Young; December 26, 1922 Casey, Illinois, U.S.
- Died: September 23, 2017 (aged 94) Glenview, Illinois, U.S.
- Party: Republican
- Spouse: Bonnie Young
- Education: University of Illinois; University of Illinois Law School

Samuel Hollingsworth Young (December 26, 1922 – September 23, 2017) was an American politician who served as a U.S. representative from Illinois.

== Early and family Life ==
Born in Casey, Illinois in 1922, Young graduated from Urbana High School in Urbana, Illinois in 1940, then began studies at the University of Illinois.

During World War II, Young interrupted his studies to serve in the United States Army as a paratrooper from 1943 to 1946. As a member of the 13th Airborne Division, he saw action in central Europe and attained the rank of captain. Using his GI Bill benefits after his honorable discharge, Young resumed his studies and received an LL.B. from the University of Illinois in 1947, and a J.D. from University of Illinois Law School in 1948.

He married Bonnie Young and during their 67-year marriage, they raised two daughters (Elizabeth and Bonnie Ellen) and a son (Samuel H. Young, Jr.).

== Career ==
Young was admitted to the Illinois bar in 1948 and commenced practice in Chicago with the United States Securities and Exchange Commission. From 1947 to 1948, Young was an instructor in economics at University of Illinois, and taught business finance at Northwestern University from 1949 to 1950, as well as developed his private legal practice.

Young served as Securities commissioner of Illinois from 1953 to 1955, and as assistant secretary of State from 1955 to 1957. In 1961, he published an article about exemptions from the registration requirement in the Illinois Securities Law of 1953. Young was financial vice president, secretary, and treasurer for a hospital supply company from 1965 to 1966. He also served as delegate to the Illinois State Republican conventions from 1951 to 1973.

Young was elected as a Republican to the Ninety-third Congress (January 3, 1973 – January 3, 1975). He was an unsuccessful candidate for reelection to the Ninety-fourth Congress in 1974, losing in a very tight election contest to Democrat Abner J. Mikva, who moved to the 10th district from the 2nd Congressional district after redistricting. After Mikva also defeated Young for election to the Ninety-fifth Congress in 1976, Young ended his public political career.

Young returned to his legal practice in Lincolnwood, Illinois, and continued to serve on the board of the Children's Care Foundation (1967 to 2005). He was admitted to the Florida bar in 1978, and concentrated his practice in trust and estates. Young also became the principal beneficiary of the estate of a wealthy, unmarried, childless businessman, which caused considerable controversy.

== Final years ==
Young maintained residences in both Glenview, Illinois, and Marco Island, Florida. He died at his home in Glenview in September 2017 at the age of 94, survived by his wife, children and ten grandchildren.

U.S. House of Representatives
| Preceded by Harold R. Collier | Member of the U.S. House of Representatives from Illinois's 10th congressional district 1973–1975 | Succeeded by Abner Mikva |
