= Howard Schomer =

American theologian, activist (1915–2001)

Howard Schomer (June 9, 1915 – June 28, 2001) was a United Nations Commission on Human Rights aide, civil rights activist, scholar, drafter of the Universal Declaration of Human Rights, and editor-at-large for The Christian Century. He received a B.S. from Harvard College in 1937; a D.D. from the Chicago Theological Seminary in 1954, and was ordained as a minister in the United Church of Christ in 1941. He was assigned to Civilian Public Service for refusing his ministerial exemption from the draft in World War II as a conscientious objector. Schomer was a close associate of Martin Luther King Jr. and remained a civil rights activist for his entire life.

He served as the Chicago Theological Seminary president from (1959–1966).
