= Wilhelm Pauck =

German-American church historian and theologian (1901–1981)

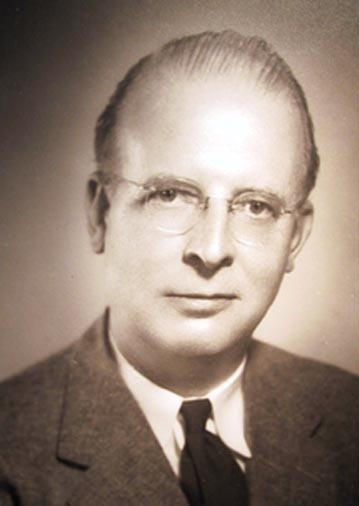
- Born: January 31, 1901; Laasphe, Germany
- Died: September 3, 1981 (aged 80); Palo Alto, California
- Education: University of Berlin
- Occupations: Church historian and theologian
- Years active: 20th century
- Spouse(s): Olga Dietz Gümbel (1928-1963); Marion H. Pauck (1964-1981)

Wilhelm Pauck (January 31, 1901 - September 3, 1981) was a German-American church historian and historical theologian in the field of Reformation studies whose fifty-year teaching career reached from the University of Chicago and Union Theological Seminary, to Vanderbilt and Stanford universities. His impact was extended through frequent lectures and visiting appointments in the U.S. and Europe. Pauck served as a bridge between the historical-critical study of Protestant theology at the University of Berlin and U.S. universities, seminaries, and divinity schools. Combining high critical acumen with a keen sense of the drama of human history, in his prime Pauck was considered the Dean of historical theology in the United States. In the course of his career he became associated with Reinhold Niebuhr and Paul Tillich as friend, colleague, and confidant.

== Biography ==
=== Formative years in Germany ===
After moving to Berlin with his family as a young boy, Pauck received a classical education in Greek, Latin, French, arithmetic, history, geography, and science at the Paulsen Realgymnasium in Berlin-Steglitz. Amid the pessimism and confusion of the First World War he became valedictorian of his class in 1920. Upon enrolling at the University of Berlin he intended to study history and philosophy, but his encounter with Karl Holl and Ernst Troeltsch caused him to turn to the study of the Reformation and to the history of theology. Through Holl, Pauck was introduced to the "Luther Renaissance," which applied critical historical study to the work of the Reformer, while Troeltsch taught him how the sixteenth-century Reformation underwent reinterpretation in the modern world. Two courses taken with Adolf von Harnack in Berlin impressed Pauck greatly. He also heard lectures by Karl Barth in Göttingen prior to returning to Berlin to pursue his dissertation on Martin Bucer's reformation treatise, De Regno Christi. In Göttingen he joined the German fraternity Göttinger Wingolf. He received the degree of Licentiate of Theology, University of Berlin, August 31, 1925. As the leading candidate of the theology faculty Pauck was sent as an exchange student to Chicago Theological Seminary for the year 1925-26. When he returned to Germany, Holl had died and a chance for a teaching appointment in Berlin was negated. Pauck declined a chance to teach in Königsberg. Fortuitously, upon the death of the church historian Henry H. Walker in Chicago, Pauck was called back to Chicago, where he was named Instructor in Church History in 1926 and remained in America for the rest of his career. On April 15, 1928 he was ordained to the ministry in the Hyde Park Congregational Church.

=== Life as a German-American ===
Having been educated in urban Berlin, Pauck experienced Chicago as a vibrant center of American life and culture. His genial and inquisitive nature made him an avid student of the U.S., both within the academy and in the larger world of politics, economics, and the arts. As a youth and university student he had witnessed the human grief and suffering that surrounded the First World War. He rejected the cultural pessimism espoused by Oswald Spengler in The Decline of the West (orig. German, 1918), because he knew persons in all walks of life who were affected by these tribulations but who remained unshaken in their spiritual roots. Alongside his Americanization Pauck never lost sight of the twentieth-century plight and horror that had seized his homeland with the rise of fascism and the Hitler state. In a speech given in 1939 at Chicago Theological Seminary, he stated:

I have detested this movement from that moment when it became clear to me that by its will to destroy the Christian foundations of Western civilization, it would lead Germany and the rest of the western world on the road to cultural ruin.

In the midst of ongoing crises of the 1930s-1940s, Pauck remained anchored in the traditions of his 19th-century forebears, especially the thought of Goethe, whom he frequently cited from memory. Pauck's life mediated between his native and his adopted culture. He became an American citizen on November 3, 1937.

== Academic career ==
=== Chicago Theological Seminary and the University of Chicago ===
When Chicago Theological Seminary appointed Pauck an instructor in 1926 he joined a growing and impressive list of scholars in the University of Chicago Divinity School, including Shailer Mathews, Shirley Jackson Case, William E. Dodd, John T. McNeill, Matthew Spinka and Charles H. Lyttle. In 1927, William W. Sweet, an American church historian joined the faculty and quickly befriended Pauck.

Wilhelm Pauck married Olga Dietz Gümbel on May 1, 1928 and rose to the rank of full professor by age 30. His 1936 presidential address of the American Society of Church History was on "The Nature of Protestantism." In 1939 he was appointed Professor of Historical Theology, Chicago Theological Seminary and The Divinity School of the University of Chicago with an additional appointment being made to the Department of History in 1945. Beginning in Chicago and continuing in his later career Pauck served on numerous elected boards, historical and theological scholarly societies, and committees of the university and the divinity schools where he pursued his career.

During the 1940s Pauck urged University President Robert Hutchins to invite refugee professors from Nazi Germany and was deeply involved with the refugee community of intellectuals and academics. In 1948-49 Pauck was an Exchange Professor at the University of Frankfurt and the University of Marburg, Germany and received the Goethe plaque from the city of Frankfurt.

Early on Pauck was troubled by the lack of attention that American liberal Protestantism gave to the theology of Karl Barth. In 1931, Pauck published Karl Barth: Prophet of a New Christianity? in an effort to defend Barth's critique of Protestant liberalism. While Pauck did support Barth's critique of liberalism he found Barth's lack of historical criticism troubling and could not defend Barth's attempt to confine God's revelation to the Bible. In later years Pauck emphasized that the title of this early book had ended with a question mark. Barth was angry at Pauck's critique but eventually came to regard him in friendly terms and suggested to him that he look at the theological ideals of Paul Tillich.

=== Union Theological Seminary, Vanderbilt and Stanford Universities ===
Wilhelm Pauck was already familiar with Tillich when he met the young Privatdozent in Berlin in 1921. Despite Pauck's residing in Chicago, the two became good friends after Tillich came to New York in 1934. That friendship deepened when Pauck moved from Chicago to teach alongside Niebuhr and Tillich at Union Theological Seminary in New York in 1953. He had long been acquainted with east coast theologians through participation in The Theological Discussion Group, which met twice a year to reflect on theological and social-economic issues. Consisting of some twenty-five theological educators, the participant list included the layman Francis P. Miller, Henry P. Van Dusen, John Coleman Bennett, Roland Bainton, Robert L. Calhoun, Georgia Harkness, H. Richard Niebuhr, Reinhold Niebuhr, Paul Tillich, in addition to Pauck, who became the group's secretary.

As Professor of Church History (1953-1960) and as the Charles A. Briggs Graduate Professor Church History (1960-1967), Pauck brought to Union Seminary the same level of institutional engagement he had practiced for 27 years in Chicago. During this time Pauck's first wife, Olga Dietz Gümbel, died January 15, 1963, and on November 21, 1964 he married the Union Seminary alumna and former Oxford University Press religion editor, Marion Hausner.

After reaching the age of retirement from Union Seminary, Wilhelm Pauck assumed the position of Distinguished Professor of Church History at the Vanderbilt University Divinity School (1967–72). His list of publications in this setting included the long-awaited book, Harnack and Troeltsch: Two Historical Theologians (1968). Following the Vanderbilt professorship he served as Visiting Professor in the Departments of History and Religious Studies at Stanford University from 1972 until his official retirement in 1976.

Together Wilhelm and Marion Pauck planned a two-volume work on Tillich, of which Volume 1 would focus on Tillich's life and be written primarily by Marion, and volume two would focus on Tillich's thought and be written primarily by Wilhelm. The first volume, Paul Tillich: Life and Thought (New York: Harper & Row), appeared in 1976. The second volume, planned as Wilhelm Pauck's exploration of Tillich's roots in German thought, was not completed, mainly due to Pauck's failing health but also because Pauck's admiration of Tillich was mixed with severe reservations about his dependence upon the German philosopher Friedrich Schelling. A significant initial section of Pauck's unpublished volume on Tillich's thought appeared posthumously in 1984 as "Paul Tillich: Heir of the Nineteenth Century." In addition, a multi-authored volume, The Thought of Paul Tillich, published by Harper and Row in 1985, includes a poignant Tillich portrait by Pauck, entitled, "To Be or Not to Be: Tillich on the Meaning of Life." The book chapter had been Pauck's last public address, given at New Harmony, Indiana, March 31, 1979.

== Teacher and educator ==
Pauck's impact as a teacher and educator was felt among colleagues as much as by his immediate students. A correspondence of 30 years with his Harvard colleague, James Luther Adams, is found among the Pauck papers at Princeton Seminary. Speaking in 1968 at the presentation of a Festschrift, his Divinity School colleague in Chicago, Lutheran theologian Joseph Sittler, described teaching as Pauck's "fabulous métier." Sittler stated further that

It is possible to say of very few men that they established a discipline in the American theological scene. . . . Now this discipline was not done by a detached career of scholarship ensconced within a university and principally engaged in research and writing; it was done in full engagement with students in classrooms and seminars. . . .

Pauck was especially noted for his ability t o mediate the past as a lively classroom lecturer, seminar teacher, podium speaker, and panelist. In his teaching and lectures, a telling anecdote would illumine the foibles and highpoints of the Christian past, while illustrating the human predicament generally and giving students courage to wrestle with similar issues in their own time and place.

Though less well known than Paul Tillich and Reinhold Niebuhr, Pauck was often present during crucial points of their careers. Like them, he preferred undogmatic expressions of neo-orthodox Christianity to more traditionalist teachings that failed to view the legacy of the church through the lens of history. Pauck had assisted in the efforts to unite a German-American denomination, the Evangelical and Reformed Church, with his denomination, the Congregational Christian Churches, thus forming the United Church of Christ in 1957. An active proponent of the ecumenical movement in the 1940s, including conversations with Roman Catholic theologians, Pauck consulted on the World Council of Churches meetings in Amsterdam (1948) and Evanston, Illinois (1954). Gradually his interest in such committee work, however, yielded to his preoccupation with the historical significance and roots of Christianity.

Though it was not inhibiting, an element of literary perfectionism, plus dedication to the needs of institutions and graduate students, limited Pauck's publishing activity. Yet his influence occurred both through his teaching and his considerable writings. A partial list of twentieth-century Reformation scholars and historians of theology influenced by him would include the names of James Luther Adams, William A. Clebsch, John Dillenberger, B.A. Gerrish, Hans Hillerbrand, Jaroslav Pelikan, Joseph Sittler, and Lewis Spitz.

== Historian and theologian ==
Pauck had confidence in the significance of the past for the present, and came to regret elements of American culture that downplay the need for a sense of what modern believers owe to their predecessors. From Goethe's Faust he took over the idea that "we must acquire knowledge of the past in order to possess it," while the abiding lesson he took from Harnack was that of "overcoming history with history." For him the latter phrase meant that one cannot get around the fact that all human culture, including religion, is anchored in history and thus subject to new interpretations. As a result, only further study of history, not a flight from history, can be used to correct mistaken views of the past. He took something like the same idea from his sole intellectual hero, Ernst Troeltsch, who taught that religion and theology are thoroughly historical, even when they purport to transmit eternal verities.

Like Adolf von Harnack, who knew that "one St. Francis has been more powerful than many of the princes of the church," Pauck stressed the power of the individual in world history, for which Martin Luther was a constant reminder. Pauck maintained that, for the foreseeable future, Protestant Christianity would necessarily continue to define itself over against Roman Catholicism, and vice versa. Although he sometimes seemed to be closer to Harnack than to Luther, his original respect for the Reformation remained intact. He criticized laissez-faire economic liberalism for its view of human autonomy, while viewing the task and challenge of theological liberalism (understood as non-fundamentalist Protestantism) to be that of preserving basic tenets of the faith while adapting to new historical conditions. He held that

The major Christian writings, including the Bible and the works of the great theologians, have been analyzed or edited by means of reliable critical methods. . . . Indeed, this critical historical interpretation of the Christian tradition constitutes the permanent achievement of liberalism.

His essay on "Luther's Faith" captures the teaching instilled by Karl Holl and the "Luther Renaissance" that Reformation faith is first and foremost a religion of conscience. Agreeing with Karl Holl's book, The Cultural Significance of the Reformation, Pauck took issue with Reinhold Niebuhr's view of Luther as lacking a social impact, while he simultaneously accorded a place of honor to Troeltsch's teaching about the difference between the sixteenth-century Reformation and modernity.

On Karl Barth's neo-Reformation teaching overall, Pauck's view was appreciative as well as critical. In "An Exposition and Criticism of Liberalism," a paper from 1935 that he revised in 1968, he wrote:

In his eagerness to assert the sovereignty of God and to recognize the act of God alone, . . . [Barth] even refuses to admit that there is a point of contact between God and man, that there exists a human possibility of arriving at the knowledge of God. . . . But this negation of human possibilities in the name of the 'totally other' God can actually be of little practical significance for the church and its work in the world.

At the same time, Pauck stated that

This criticism of Barth's theology must not prevent us from a serious consideration of the protest which has called it into being. For Barth's whole thought is a violent outburst against modern civilization and its dependence upon the principle of the freedom and the self-determination of man. . . . He accuses modern Christians of having closed their eyes to the power of sin and evil, which again and again destroys the unity not only of individual persons and of social groups but also of the world. I think that Barth is justified in making this accusation.

Pauck's "General Introduction" to his translation of Luther's Lectures on Romans shows how much the recovery of Reformation teaching owes to historical-critical scholarship. The 1905 discovery of this manuscript in Berlin gave us the young Luther's most significant exegetical work, thus providing a key to his rediscovery of the Gospel. The fresh translation of Luther's original German and occasional Latin, together with annotations, continues to be a monument of Reformation research. Without such scholarship, Pauck thought, the idea of reformulating classical Reformation doctrine, as proposed by Karl Barth, was impossible. Hence, the abiding lesson of Pauck's teaching is that critical historical scholarship and constructive theology must somehow continue to work together.

== Selected list of publications ==
- With H. R. Niebuhr and Francis Pickens, The Church Against the World (New York, Willett, Clark & Company, 1935).
- Harnack and Troeltsch: Two Historical Theologians (New York: Oxford University Press, 1968).
- Karl Barth: Prophet of a New Christianity? (New York: Harper, 1931).
- Editor and translator, Luther: Lectures on Romans (Philadelphia: The Westminster Press, 1961), with a general introduction, pp. xvii-lxvi. [The Library of Christian Classics XV].
- Editor, Melanchthon and Bucer (Philadelphia: The Westminster Press, 1969) [The Library of Christian Classics XIX].
- With Marion Pauck, Paul Tillich: His Life and Thought (New York: Harper and Row, 1976).
- Martin Butzer, Das Reich Gottes auf Erden. Utopie und Wirklichkeit, eine Untersuchung zu Butzers "De Regno Christi" und zur englischen Staatskirche des 16. Jahrhunderts, Berlin und Leipzig (Walter de Gruyter, 1928) [Martin Bucer: The Kingdom of God on Earth].
- "To Be or Not to Be: Tillich on the Meaning of Life," in The Thought of Paul Tillich, eds., James Luther Adams, Wilhelm Pauck, and Roger Shinn (New York: Harper and Row, 1985).

== Further information ==
- Marion Hausner Pauck, "Bibliography of the Published Writings of Wilhelm Pauck," in Interpreters of Luther, ed., Jaroslav Pelikan (Philadelphia: Fortress Press, 1968), pp. 362–366, provides a more complete list of publications, including articles.
- "A Chronology of the Life of Wilhelm Pauck," is available in From Luther to Tillich: The Reformers and Their Heirs, edited by Marion Pauck with an Introduction by Jaroslav Pelikan (San Francisco: Harper & Row, 1984), pp. 210–215.
- Jaroslav Pelikan, "Introduction Wilhelm Pauck: A Tribute," in Interpreters of Luther, pp. 1–8.
