= Susan Brooks Thistlethwaite =

American theologian and minister (born 1948)

The Reverend Susan Brooks Thistlethwaite
- Born: 1948 (age 77–78)

Academic background
- Education: Smith College (BA); Duke University (MDiv)
- Alma mater: Duke University (PhD)
- Thesis: H. Shelton Smith, Critic of the Theological Perspective of Progressive Religious Education, 1934-1950 (1980)

Academic work
- Discipline: Theology
- Institutions: Chicago Theological Seminary

Susan Brooks Thistlethwaite (born 1948) is an author, former president of Chicago Theological Seminary, a syndicated columnist, ordained minister, activist, theologian, and translator of the Bible. She is currently an emeritus faculty member at Chicago Theological Seminary. She also spent some of her time serving as a trustee for different organizations.

== Biography ==
Susan Brooks Thistlethwaite attended Smith College, in Northampton, Massachusetts, where she earned a Bachelor of Arts. She, then continued her studies at Duke Divinity School, earning a Master of Divinity and graduating Summa cum Laude. She was ordained as a minister in the United Church of Christ in 1974. She ministered for several years as an associate minister in North Carolina and Massachusetts, before earning a PhD from Duke University. During her time in North Carolina, she worked with women who had experienced domestic violence.

She taught women's studies and theology in various schools from 1975 to 1984. She served on a task force of the National Council of Churches that produced an inclusive language lectionary, while she was teaching theology at Boston University in the early 1980s. In 1984, she joined the faculty at Chicago Theological Seminary (CTS), a seminary affiliated with the United Church of Christ. In 1998, she became the president of the seminary, the first woman to lead the institution since its founding in 1855. She served two five year terms, stepping down from the post in 2008. Alice Hunt succeeded her as president of CTS.

Thistlethwaite became a Senior Fellow at the Center for American Progress in 2008, while also teaching full-time. She continued to be a public theologian, writing and speaking on matters relating to religion and public life. She wrote a column in The Washington Post for six years. She's contributed to articles for Theology Today, the Journal for Religious Education, and the Journal of Feminist Studies in Religion.

== Works ==
- Thistlethwaite, Susan B. and Victor Gold, Thomas Hoyt, Jr., Sharon Ringe, Burton Throckmorton, eds. The New Testament and Psalms: A New Inclusive Version (1995)
- Thistlethwaite, Susan B. and Rita Nakashima Brock. Casting Stones: Prostitution and Liberation in Asia and the United States (1996)
- Thistlethwaite, Susan B. and Mary Potter Engel, eds. Lift Every Voice: Constructing Christian Theologies from the Underside (1998)
- Thistlethwaite, Susan B. and Glen Harold Stassen Abrahamic alternatives to war Jewish, Christian, and Muslim perspectives on just peacemaking (2008)
- Thistlethwaite, Susan B. Sex, Race and God: Christian Feminism in Black and White (reprinted 2009)
- Thistlethwaite, Susan B., ed. Adam, Eve and the Genome: Theology in Dialogue with the Human Genome Project.
- Thistlethwaite, Susan B. Dreaming of Eden: American Religion and Politics in a Wired World (2010)
- Thistlethwaite, Susan B. #Occupy the Bible: What Jesus Really Said (and Did) about Money and Power (2013)
- Thistlethwaite, Susan B. Women's Bodies as Battlefield: Christian Theology and the Global War on Women (2015)
- Thistlethwaite, Susan B. “Feel Awful? How to identify Trump’s Politics of Abuse and Subvert It” from Taking it to the streets : public theologies of activism and resistance (2018)
