= Rami Nashashibi =

Palestinian-American activist and sociologist

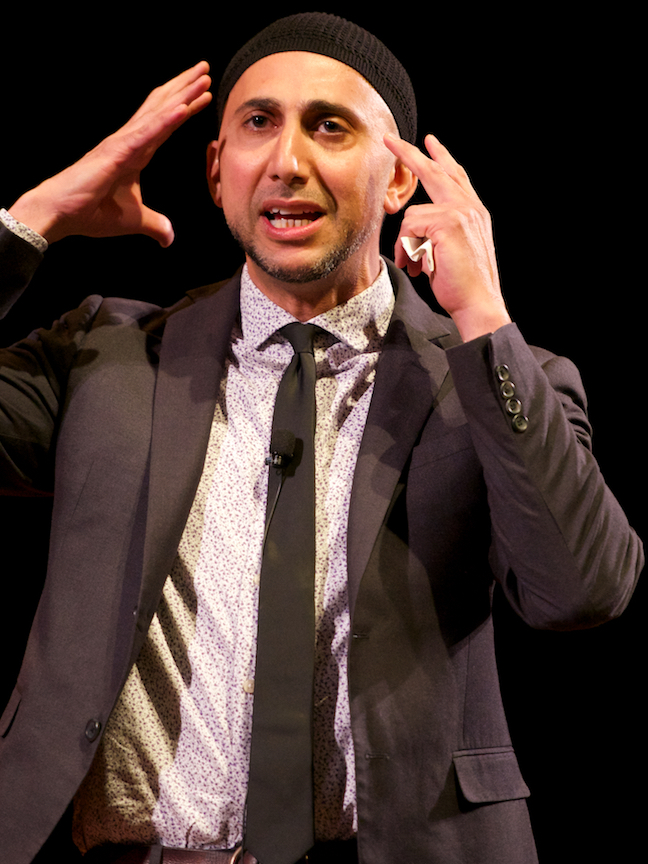
- Nashashibi in 2017
- Education: DePaul University; University of Chicago
- Occupations: Activist; Community organizer; Sociologist; Islamic studies scholar
- Awards: MacArthur Fellowship; Opus prize

Rami Nashashibi is a Palestinian-American activist, community organizer, sociologist, and Islamic studies scholar. He founded the nonprofit organization Inner-City Muslim Action Network in 1997, working as its executive director for many years, and has been involved in a number of efforts to improve the welfare of residents of the South Side of Chicago. He has also worked as a sociologist and religious studies scholar at universities, and as a musician. Nashashibi was a 2017 MacArthur Fellow.

== Early life and education ==
Nashashibi attended Saint Xavier University for the first year of his university education, where he held a soccer scholarship. After his freshman year he transferred to DePaul University, where he graduated with a B.A. degree in 1995. Nashashibi then attended graduate school at the University of Chicago, obtaining an A.M. degree in 1998. While working as an activist, Nashashibi continued to study sociology at the University of Chicago, and he completed a PhD in 2011. His scholarship and his activism both involved identifying or building connections between African American and Muslim immigrant communities.

== Career ==
In 1997, while still a graduate student at the University of Chicago, Nashashibi founded the nonprofit Inner-City Muslim Action Network, which aims to address systemic injustices affecting communities of color living on the South Side of Chicago. He continued to work as the executive director of the organization for many years after it was incorporated in 1997. The MacArthur Foundation described Nashashibi's work with the organization as involving organizing a coalition of African American Muslims and Muslim immigrants to advance social justice for residents of the South Side who are vulnerable to such problems as housing foreclosure, unemployment, and violence. The nonprofit also lobbies for socially progressive policies, and converts vacant properties into housing for lower-income residents. Though the Inner-City Muslim Action Network is informed by Muslim social ethics, a major emphasis of the organization has been to build coalitions both within and outside of the Muslim community in Chicago, reflecting the diversity of the Marquette Park neighborhood in which it is based.

Nashashibi's activism on the South Side of Chicago has also included drives to make healthy food available in areas where stores do not typically carry affordable healthy groceries, both through the Inter-City Muslim Action Network and through the Muslim Run Corner Store Campaign. The Inter-City Muslim Action Network also hosts cultural events, such as the Takin' It To The Streets festival in Marquette Park, and has opened a second chapter in Atlanta.

In addition to his activism, Nashashibi has worked as an academic, teaching subjects related to sociology and Islamic studies at universities and colleges. This includes working as a visiting professor at the Chicago Theological Seminary in the Sociology of Religion and Muslim Studies.

In 2016, Nashashibi served on the President's Advisory Council on Faith-Based and Neighborhood Partnerships, which developed recommendations to the Obama administration on how to collaborate with faith-based and neighborhood organizations to serve people in need.

In 2020, Nashashibi was the executive producer, lyricist, and guitarist on an album, This Love Thing, with fellow activist Drea D'Nur and sound engineer Elijah Hooks.

== Awards and recognition ==
In 2009, Nashashibi was named one of the 500 most influential Muslims by The Royal Islamic Strategic Studies Centre and the Prince Alwaleed Bin Talal Center for Muslim-Christian Understanding by Georgetown University. In 2014, the Center for American Progress listed Nashashibi as one of "14 Faith Leaders to Watch in 2014". In 2017, Nashashibi was named a MacArthur Fellow, for "confronting the challenges of poverty and disinvestment in urban communities through a Muslim-led civic engagement effort that bridges race, class, and religion". In 2018, he won the Opus Prize, a faith-based award for social entrepreneurship.

== See also ==
- Nashashibi clan
