= Ken Stone (biblical scholar) =

American biblical scholar

Ken Stone is an author, Professor of Bible, Culture and Hermeneutics at Chicago Theological Seminary and a member of the United Church of Christ. He chairs the Reading, Theory and the Bible Section of the Society of Biblical Literature. The winner of a Lambda Literary Award, Stone focuses much of his research and writing on the relationship between biblical hermeneutics and matters of gender and sexuality (see queer theology). His other research and teaching interests include the relationship between critical theory and biblical interpretation and matters of gender, sexuality, animals, and ecology.

== Education ==
He received a Master of Divinity degree from the Church of God School of Theology in 1987, a Master of Theology degree from Harvard Divinity School in 1989, and a Ph.D. from Vanderbilt University in 1995.

== Publications ==
Books

- Reading the Hebrew Bible with Animal Studies (Stanford University Press, 2017)
- Practicing Safer Texts: Food, Sex and Bible in Queer Perspective (T. & T. Clark, 2005)
- Queer Commentary and the Hebrew Bible, ed. (Sheffield Academic Press/Pilgrim Press, 2001)
- Sex, Honor and Power in the Deuteronomistic History (Sheffield Academic Press, 1996).

Articles

- "'Do Not Be Conformed To This World': Queer Reading And The Task Of The Preacher." Theology & Sexuality 13.2 (2007): 153–165.
- "Flame Of Yahweh: Sexuality In The Old Testament." Biblical Interpretation 19.3 (2011): 339–341.
- "Homosexuality And The Bible Or Queer Reading? A Response To Martti Nissinen." Theology & Sexuality 7.14 (2001): 107–118.
- "Safer Text: Reading Biblical Laments In The Age Of AIDS." Theology & Sexuality 5.10 (1999): 16.
