= Rachel Mikva =

Rabbi Rachel S. Mikva is an American rabbi and academic. She is the Rabbi Herman E. Schaalman Chair & Associate Professor of Jewish Studies, and Senior Faculty Fellow of the InterReligious Institute at Chicago Theological Seminary, Illinois, United States.

== Life ==
Mikva was ordained at Hebrew Union College in 1990. She served as a congregational rabbi for 13 years.

In 2009, Mikva was awarded a grant by the American Academy for Jewish Research to develop electronic formats for Hebrew Scriptures.

In 2024, Mikva described herself as "a committed progressive Jew" and as a Reform Jew.

Mikva was elected to Hebrew Union College's Board of Governors in 2025. She was named an Interfaith Leadership Network Fellow in 2026.

== Publications ==
=== Books ===
- Broken Tablets: Restoring the Ten Commandments and Ourselves. 2000.
- Midrash vaYosha: A Medieval Midrash on the Song at the Sea. Texts and Studies in Medieval and Early Modern Judaism. Tübingen: Mohr Siebeck. 2012. ISBN 978-3-16-151009-0.
- Dangerous Religious Ideas: The Deep Roots of Self-Critical Faith in Judaism, Christianity, and Islam. Beacon Press. 2020.
- Interreligious Studies: An Introduction. Cambridge: Cambridge University Press. 2023. ISBN 9781108826600.
- Monotheism and Pluralism. Cambridge University Press. 2024.

=== Chapters ===
- Gertsman, Elina, ed. (2012-02-20). "Weeping as Discourse between Heaven and Earth: The Transformative Power of Tears in Medieval Jewish Literature". Crying in the Middle Ages: Tears of History (1 ed.). Routledge. doi:10.4324/9780203807750. ISBN 978-0-203-80775-0.
- Beal, Jane, ed. (2014-01-01). "Epic and Romance, Narrative and Exegesis: Moses in the Minor Midrashim". Illuminating Moses: A History of Reception from Exodus to the Renaissance. BRILL. pp. 143–165. doi:10.1163/9789004258549. ISBN 978-90-04-25854-9.
- McFarlane, Doreen, ed. (2024-07-05). "Imagine I Am Sitting There: An Interreligious Perspective on Matthew 23". Furthering Interfaith Biblical Scholarship: A Festschrift in Memory of Andre LaCocque. Wipf and Stock Publishers. ISBN 978-1-6667-7681-2.

=== Articles ===
- Mikva, Rachel S. (2011). "Midrash in the Synagogue and the Attenuation of Targum". Jewish Studies Quarterly. 18 (4). Mohr Siebeck GmbH & Co. KG: 319–342. ISSN 0944-5706.
- Mikva, Rachel S. (2014-06-01). "Bridges Across an Impossible Divide: The Inner Lives of Arab and Jewish Peacemakers". Journal of Church and State. 56 (2): 382–383. doi:10.1093/jcs/csu011. ISSN 0021-969X.
- "Reflections in the Waves: What Interreligious Studies Can Learn from the Evolution of Women's Movements in the U.S.". Journal of Ecumenical Studies. 53 (4): 461–482. 2018. doi:10.1353/ecu.2018.0035. ISSN 2162-3937.
