= Inner-City Muslim Action Network =

Religious organization based in Chicago, Illinois, United States

- Abbreviation: IMAN
- Formation: 1996
- Type: 501(c)3
- Legal status: Social Work
- Headquarters: Chicago, Illinois
- Region served: Chicago
- Website: www.imancentral.org

Inner-City Muslim Action Network (IMAN), founded in 1996 by Rami Nashashibi, is one of the leading Muslim charity organizations in the United States.

According to the Inner-City Muslim Action Network, IMAN seeks "to utilize the tremendous possibilities and opportunities that are present in the community to build a dynamic and vibrant alternative to the difficult conditions of inner city life." IMAN sees understanding Islam as part of a larger process to empower individuals and communities to work for the betterment of humanity. Consequently, IMAN has initiated a diverse set of community programs and projects with the hope of changing the conditions in the inner city, in particular the communities on Chicago's South and Southwest Side. IMAN provides a range of direct social services through the IMAN/ICIC Food Pantry, IMAN Health Clinic, and IMAN's Career Development Initiative (ICDI). "Takin' It To The Streets" is IMAN's most popular and well-known project. The festival draws people from all over the Chicago area for a day of festivities, musical performances, sports tournaments, and carnivals.

Directors are listed as: Rami Nashashibi, Ayat Elnoory, Asad Jafri, M. Altaf Kaiseruddin.
