= Chicago Theological Seminary =

Christian ecumenical seminary in Chicago, Illinois, U.S.

Coordinates: 41.7898°N 87.5976°W

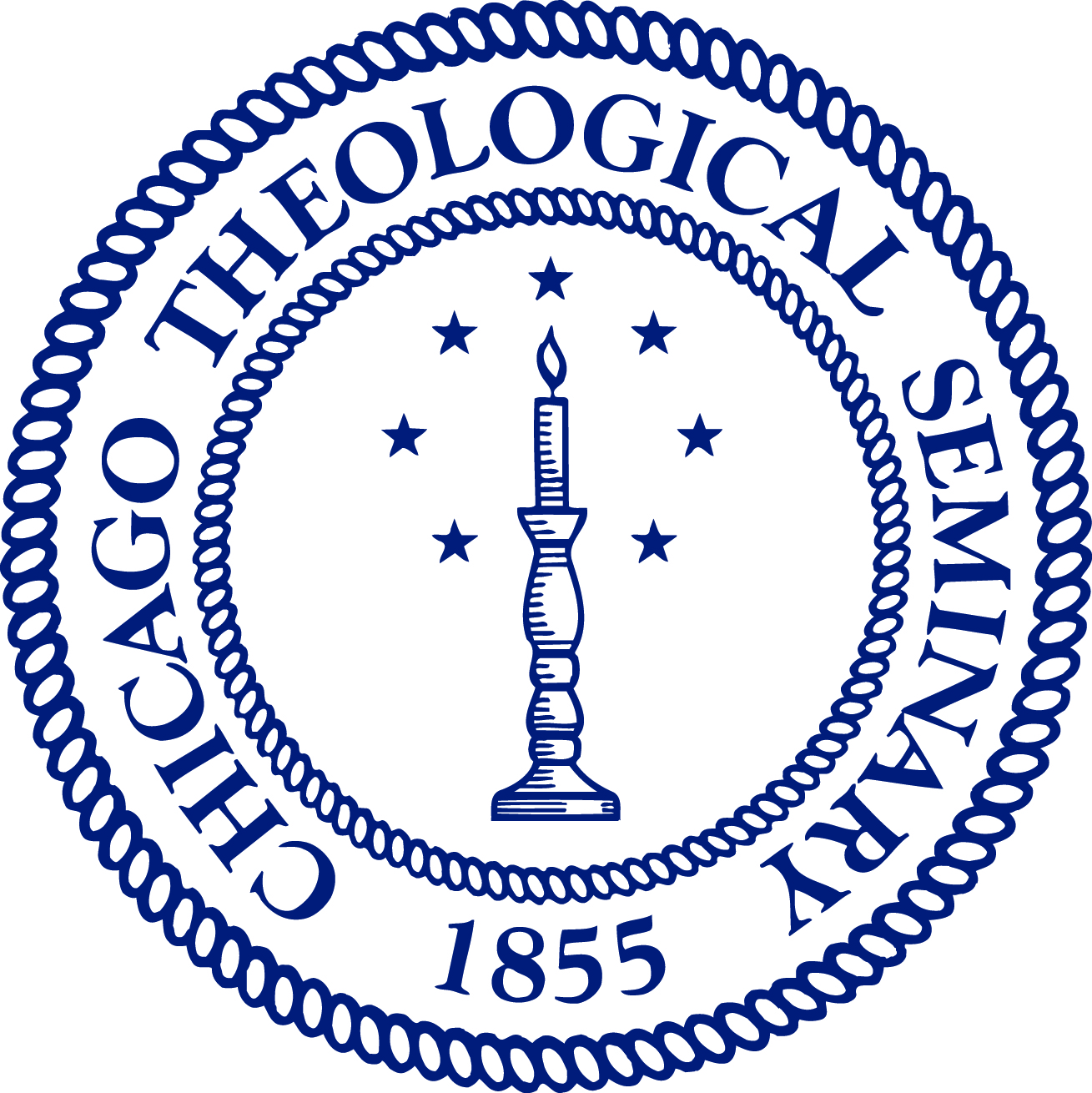
- Motto: "Leaders for the Next"
- Type: Private
- Established: 1855; 171 years ago
- Religious affiliation: United Church of Christ
- Academic affiliations: University of Chicago; Association of Chicago Theological Schools
- President: Dr. Brad Braxton
- Dean: Emily Vogt
- Faculty: 11 Full-time (Fall 2024)
- Students: 202 (Fall 2024)
- Location: 1407 E. 60th Street, Chicago, Illinois, United States
- Campus: Urban 78,000 sq ft (7,200 m^{2}), 4-story seminary with full basement located in the center of the University of Chicago campus
- Website: www.ctschicago.edu
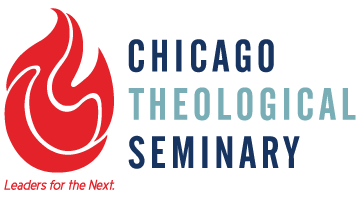

The Chicago Theological Seminary (CTS) is a Christian ecumenical American seminary located in Chicago, Illinois, and is one of several seminaries historically affiliated with the United Church of Christ. It is the oldest institution of higher education in Chicago, originally established in 1855 under the direction of the abolitionist Stephen Peet and the Congregational Church (now the United Church of Christ) by charter of the Illinois legislature.

In addition to being a seminary of the United Church of Christ, CTS offers students coursework necessary to be ordained by the Metropolitan Community Church denomination. It was the first theological school to introduce the field education experience into a seminary curriculum, the first to create a distinct Department of Christian Sociology in an American theological school, and the first seminary to award a degree in divinity to a woman in the United States (Florence Fensham, 1902).

== History ==
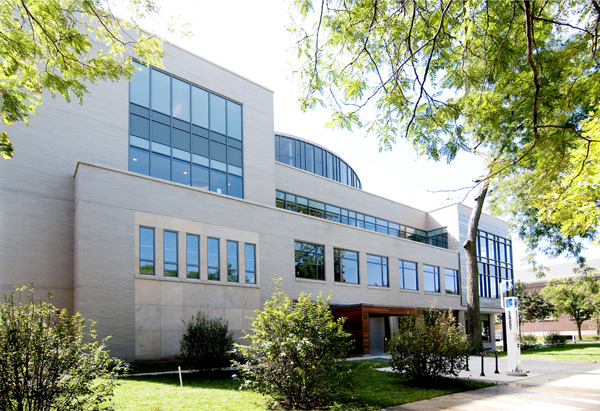
The Chicago Theological Seminary at its new location in Hyde Park, Chicago

Unintimidated by controversy, Chicago Theological Seminary has a record of setting trends in American faith life and leadership for more than a century.

In the 1850s and 1860s, CTS founder Stephen Peet was a leader in a new generation of 19th-century American abolitionists no longer content to wait for the end of slavery nor to tolerate those who defended it. Under his leadership, the seminary was active in the Underground Railroad and was a leading voice in the Christian Abolitionism movement.

The first CTS curriculum in 1855 was provided for students among congregations and missions across the Midwest. Students were encouraged to learn by direct experience the facts of community life and church needs in an experimental culture. Although such a practice was unknown at that time, this curriculum was the beginning of the first field education component introduced into seminary education. Field education is now a part of every accredited professional theological degree program.

=== Twentieth century ===
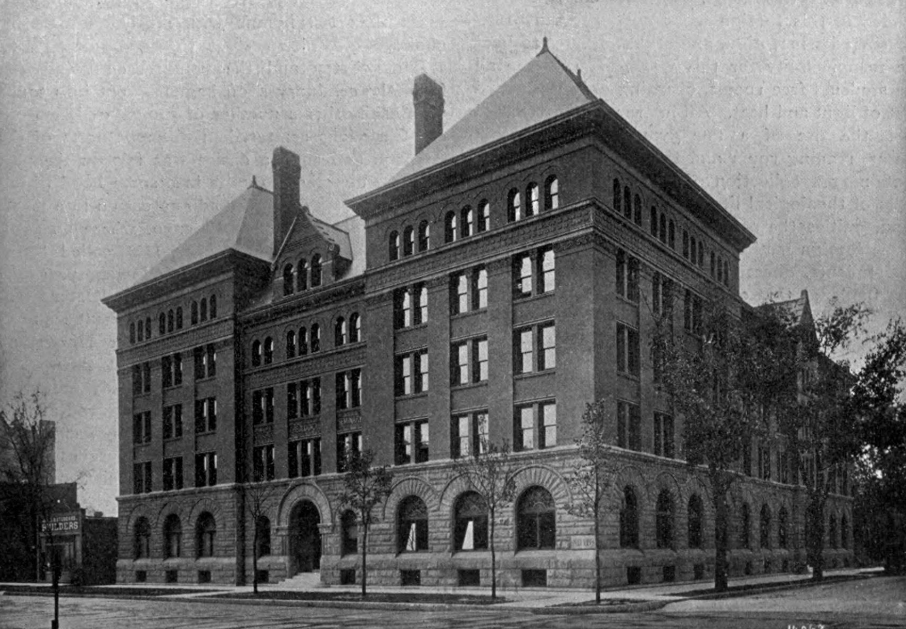
c. 1905

Because of a conviction that training for ministry needed to combine the study of Christian faith and the world of secular knowledge and action, during President Ozora Davis' tenure in 1900s, CTS moved to the vicinity of the University of Chicago. Under Ozora Davis' leadership the buildings of the seminary were financed and constructed, and the relationship with the University of Chicago established.

After recognizing Florence Fensham with the first American seminary degree awarded to a woman, Chicago Theological Seminary founded the Congregational Training School for Women in 1909 to provide Congregational women with advanced educational training. The school continued its mission until it was subsumed into the Chicago Theological Seminary in 1926. Florence Fensham was the school's first dean, succeeded by Agnes M. Taylor and Margaret M. Taylor after Dean Fensham died unexpectedly in 1912. The Chicago Theological Seminary allow full acceptance of women to its programs in 1926, thereby eliminating the need for a separate institution for women.

In 1892, CTS invited Graham Taylor, a professor of theology at Hartford Theological Seminary in Connecticut who had shown success in working with the poor, to establish the United States' first Department of Christian Sociology at CTS. Taylor worked closely with leading Chicago activist Jane Addams, founder of Hull House, an American settlement house. Taylor established the Chicago Commons settlement house in Chicago's Fulton Market neighborhood, where with the help of CTS students he brought recreational clubs, classes, a day nursery, and a kindergarten to the working poor. The house had 25 residents and was open to all ethnic groups and religious denominations. Pressed for space, the Chicago Commons moved a few blocks north to the building formerly occupied by the Chicago Congregational Tabernacle, where Taylor expanded the courses offered into the Chicago School of Civics and Philanthropy, which later became the University of Chicago School of Social Service Administration.

In the 1920s, Anton Boisen, a pioneer in the hospital chaplaincy movement and founder of the Council for the Clinical Training of Theological Students, began lecturing every fall quarter in the social ethics department of CTS. In 1932, he became chaplain of Elgin State Hospital (now Elgin Mental Health Center) and founded a Chicago arm of the Council for the Clinical Training of Theological Students. His work to help theological students better understand and minister to physically, mentally, and emotionally ill people ultimately led to the founding of the Association for Clinical Pastoral Education. Boisen's ashes are interred in the CTS cloisters.

In 1957, as the American civil rights movement escalated, CTS became the first seminary in the United States to award Rev. Dr. Martin Luther King an Honorary Doctor of Divinity degree in recognition of his activism. Two years later CTS alumnus Howard Schomer, who had received his doctorate of divinity from CTS in 1954, became president of the seminary. Schomer was a conscientious objector and former aide to the United Nations Commission on Human Rights who had assisted in the drafting of the Universal Declaration of Human Rights in 1948. A close associate of King, Schomer in March 1965 led a contingent of CTS students that included scholarship recipient Jesse Jackson, Sr. to Selma, Alabama, to march with local residents against segregation. Jackson dropped out of the Master of Divinity program just three courses short of degree completion in order to work on the civil rights movement full time. He went on to found Operation PUSH (People United to Serve Humanity), a Chicago counterpart to the southern civil rights movement that focused on the economic empowerment of African-Americans and poor people of all races, and the Rainbow Coalition, which worked to unite disenfranchised American groups, from racial minorities to small farmers, in order to exercise political power. CTS ultimately awarded Jackson the Master of Divinity in 2000 in recognition of his life's work.

During the 1960s, John W. de Gruchy, a white South African theologian who later became known for his work resisting Apartheid, attended CTS.

In 1965, CTS began a Doctorate of Religion program, one of the first professional doctorates in ministry. As standards for the professional doctorate were established by the Association of Theological Schools, the seminary became one of the initial group of six schools to have fully accredited programs of study for the Doctor of Ministry degree.

In the 1980s, CTS engaged in the anti-apartheid movement advocating for the divestment of resources from South Africa. In 1986, the seminary awarded Archbishop Desmond Tutu an honorary Doctor of Divinity degree for his activism to liberate black South Africans.

=== Twenty-first century ===
In 2006, CTS launched the Lesbian, Gay, Bisexual, Transgender, Queer (LGBTQ) Religious Studies Center (Queer Center), a grant-funded research program and resource for activists seeking to move toward greater justice and to encourage new conversations. CTS is also home to the Lesbian Gay Bisexual and Transgender Religious Archives Network, and the seminary's Heyward Boswell Society for LGBTQ people and allies engages students across campus in social activities. CTS also offers an annual Gilberto Castaneda scholarship award for outstanding GLBT students. CTS has graduated some of the nation's first transgender ministers and has many openly gay, lesbian, bisexual, and transgender students, staff, and faculty. Several of the seminary's faculty members have published books and articles regarding religion, sexual orientation, and gender identity. The United Church of Christ Coalition for GLBT Concerns lists Chicago Theological Seminary as an officially "Open and Affirming" institution that is especially welcoming to gay, lesbian, bisexual, transgender, and intersex concerns.

In 2007, CTS established the Center for the Study of Black Faith and Life (CSBFL), becoming the first denominational seminary to have a center devoted to engaging the larger Black Faith community through inclusivity of a variety of religions. CSBFL sponsors the annual C. Shelby Rooks lecture, which brings outstanding black theologians, ministers, activists, and non-profit leaders to campus.

In 2009, CTS became the first free-standing Protestant seminary to endow a faculty chair in Jewish studies, with the hope of advancing interfaith engagement and multi-faith education. The next year, CTS founded the Center for Jewish, Christian, and Islamic Studies (JCIS), the first American program of its kind based in a free-standing theological seminary. This center offers resources to students who concentrate in theology, ethics, and human sciences that enable scholars to experientially and theoretically integrate Jewish, Christian, and Muslim theology with these topics. In 2017, CTS established the InterReligious Institute (IRI), which stands counter to the idea that Christianity is the "normal" religious position for Americans and seeks to create space in the public square for people of other religions and for people with no religion. IRI does this by providing ongoing events, resources, and training materials for the public.

In 2019, CTS began a partnership with Bayan Claremont to provide both a graduate certificate and an accredited Master of Divinity in Islamic Chaplaincy at the seminary's Hyde Park campus.

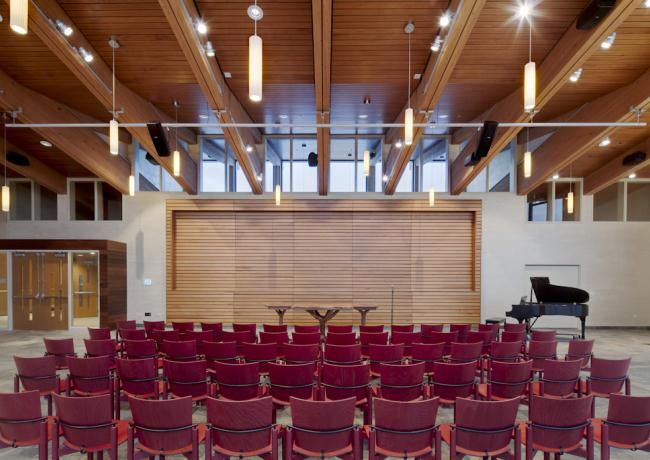
New Chapel elevation

=== Notable firsts ===
- CTS is the oldest institution of higher education in Chicago.
- CTS faculty and students participated in the abolitionist movement and the Underground Railroad prior to the Civil War.
- First seminary to introduce field education into a seminary curriculum in the US.
- First to create a distinct Department of Christian Sociology in an American theological school.
- First seminary to award a degree in divinity to a woman in the US. (Florence Fensham, 1902).
- Faculty and students instrumental in founding the Association for Clinical Pastoral Education (ACPE) in 1930.
- First seminary in the US to award Martin Luther King Jr. an honorary Doctor of Divinity degree for his activism in the civil rights movement.
- First African American to lead a predominantly white theological school (C. Shelby Rooks, 1974–1984).
- First free-standing Protestant seminary to endow a chair in Jewish Studies, advancing interfaith engagement and multi-faith education.

== Campus ==
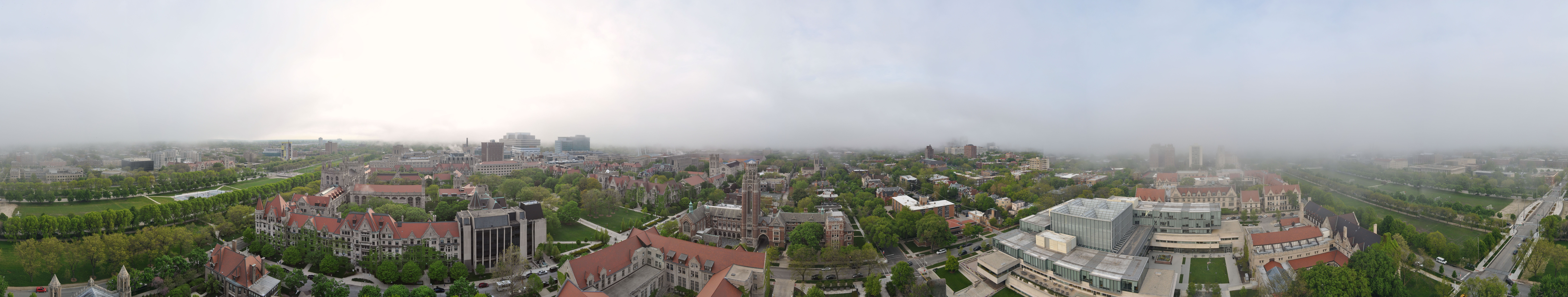
The Chicago Theological Seminary is an independent educational institution located within the broader campus of the University of Chicago. From the top of Rockefeller Chapel, the Main Quadrangles can be seen on the left (West), the Oriental Institute and the Booth School of Business and Laboratory Schools can be seen on the right (East). The panoramic is bounded on both sides by the Midway Plaisance (South).

The original buildings were designed by Herbert Riddle and built between 1923 and 1928. Riddle was the architect for Mather Tower in the Loop, as well as many buildings in New York. The original CTS building complex included stained glass windows, medieval style groin vaulting, furniture, lighting fixtures, ceramic ornament and tile work, and architectural relics—all of the highest quality of the day.

=== New building ===
The seminary, which was for decades located at 5757 South University Avenue in the Hyde Park neighborhood of Chicago, adjacent to the University of Chicago, during the 2011/2012 academic year moved to 1407 East 60th Street, also in Hyde Park. The building designed by Riddle that had served as a seminary for decades became home to the Department of Economics at the University of Chicago and the Becker Friedman Institute for Research in Economics.

Construction of the new $30 million CTS facility was a partnership between the University of Chicago and the Chicago Theological Seminary. In May 2008, the University of Chicago Board of Trustees Executive Committee authorized the purchase of two CTS buildings and an adjacent parking lot. Additionally, the University of Chicago agreed to construct a new seminary building at 60th Street and Dorchester Avenue. The seminary's new building, designed by Nagle Hartray Architecture, is located at 1407 E. 60th Street and is LEED Gold-certified and fully ADA accessible. By 2013, the building project had acquired numerous private and public funds.

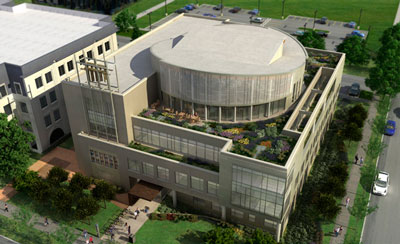
Aerial view of new CTS building on University of Chicago campus

=== Lapp Learning Commons Library ===
The Robinson & Janet Lapp Learning Commons, centrally located on the third floor of CTS's new building, is a working theological collection of more than 45,000 volumes. The library also subscribes to more than 700 periodicals and runs multiple research database platforms. Special holdings include the Boisen Collection in psychology and personality science, and the Campbell Morgan Collection named for G. Campbell Morgan, containing his sermons, writings, books, newspaper clips, lecture notes, photographs, and other archival materials. The Commons is also home to a number of rare books, including a 1670 first quarto edition of Thomas Hobbes' Leviathan published in London by Johannem Tomsoni. The collection is strong in the theological subject areas of Bible, Church history, and theology. Particular fields of note also include African American religion and spirituality, women's studies, LGBT/queer studies, and Jewish and Christian studies.

Besides the Lapp Learning Commons, CTS students also have access to the University of Chicago Library system, the 11th largest library collection in the United States. CTS students and faculty can use this resource in person.

== Academics ==
=== Accreditation and ordination ===
The seminary is accredited by the Association of Theological Schools in the United States and Canada and the Higher Learning Commission.

In addition to being a seminary of the United Church of Christ, it offers students coursework necessary to be ordained by the Metropolitan Community Church.

=== Degrees ===
Interior of the original seminary
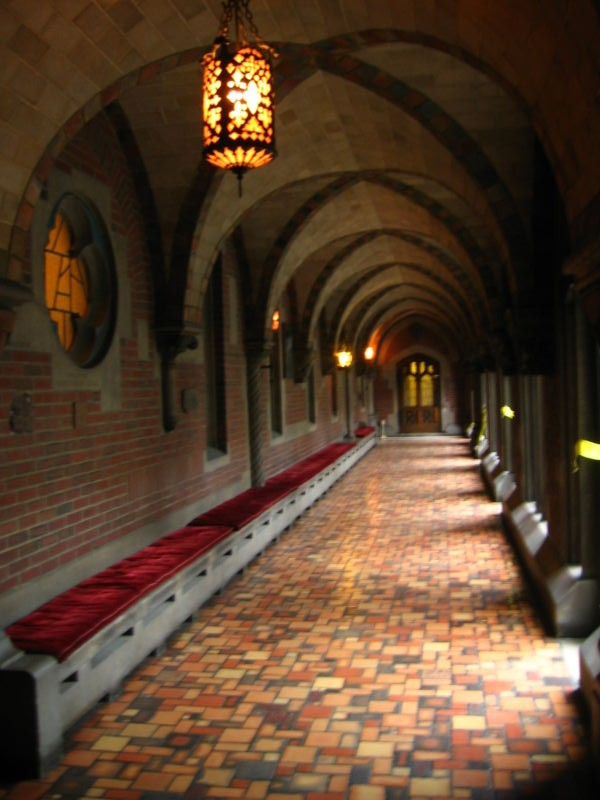
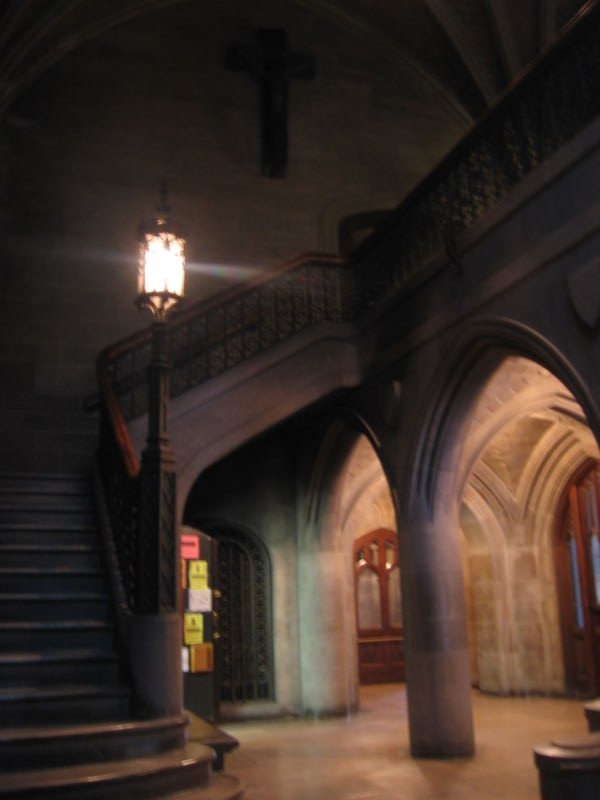
- Master of Divinity (M.Div.)
- Masters of Arts
- Master of Sacred Theology (S.T.M.)
- Doctor of Ministry (D.Min.)
- Doctor of Philosophy (Ph.D.)

== Notable people ==
=== Presidents ===
- Franklin Fisk (1888–1901), one of the most widely known theologians and educators of the West, according to The New York Times, Yale University alumnus and valedictorian, and first president of Chicago Theological Seminary.
- Joseph H. George (1901–1906)
- Graham Taylor, interim (1906–1908)
- Ozora Stearns Davis (1909–1929), prominent Congregational minister, hymn writer, long-time president of CTS, and biographer of his friend journalist Victor Freemont Lawson.
- Carl S. Patton, interim (1928–1930)
- Albert W. Palmer (1930–1946), Social Gospel reformer, peace activist, pastor
- Arthur Cushman McGiffert, Jr. (1946–1959), instructor, Fulbright scholar, professor, and church historian
- Howard Schomer (1959–1966), conscientious objector, United Nations Commission on Human Rights aide, civil rights activist, scholar, drafter of the Universal Declaration of Human Rights, and editor-at-large for Christian Century.
- Edward Manthei (1967–1971)
- Thomas Campbell (1971–1973), member of the National Inter-religious Task Force on Soviet Jewry, The American Jewish Committee
- Victor Obenhaus, interim (1973–1974) Union Theological Seminary (Manhattan) alumni, author, professor of Christian ethics, National Council of Churches leader, prison reform advocate.
- C. Shelby Rooks (1974–1984), Scholar, lecturer, administrator, and UCC leader
- Betty Reneker, interim (1984), Philanthropist, president of Children's Home and Aid Society of Illinois, and president of the National Fellowship of Congregational Christian Women.
- Kenneth B. Smith, Sr. (1984–1998), pastor, founder of Trinity United Church of Christ, Chicago school board member, community leader
- Susan Brooks Thistlethwaite (1998–2008), Author, columnist, ordained minister, activist, theologian, translator of the Bible
- Alice Hunt (2008–2018), Minister, biblical scholar, Hubble Space Telescope computer programmer, and former Associate Dean of Vanderbilt University Divinity School
- Donald C. Clark, Jr. (2017–2018), Counselor at law, entrepreneur, retired general counsel for the United Church of Christ, and past CTS board chair, served as Acting President while Hunt was on sabbatical.
- Stephen G. Ray, Jr. (2018–present), Professor, theologian, author, writer, ordained minister, activist, former Neal F. and Ila A. Fisher Professor of Systematic Theology at Garrett-Evangelical Theological Seminary.

=== Notable former faculty ===
- Clarence Beckwith—Author, minister, and professor at CTS
- Anton Boisen—Leading figure in the hospital chaplaincy and clinical pastoral education movements.
- Fred Eastman—Theologist, professor, playwright, author, and journalist; chair of dept. of religious drama and literature at CTS (1926–1952)
- Clara E. Powell—First female professor at CTS, and English teacher.
- Andre LaCocque—Founder of The Center of Jewish-Christian Studies & Professor of Hebrew Scriptures (1969–1999), Theologian, scholar, author and co-author of Thinking Biblically with philosopher Paul Ricoeur
- G. Campbell Morgan—British evangelist, preacher and a leading Bible scholar (D.D., 1902)
- Graham Taylor—Minister, social reformer, educator and founder of Chicago Commons Settlement House which later became the University of Chicago's School of Social Service Administration.
- Rabbi Herman Schaalman—Activist, rabbi, scholar, son of Dachau concentration camp survivor, rabbi emeritus of Congregation Emanuel, past president of the Council of Religious Leaders of Metropolitan Chicago, honoree of the Herman Schaalman Chair of Jewish Studies at Chicago Theological Seminary.
- Yoshio Fukuyama—Theologian and religious pioneer, father of Francis Fukuyama
- Wilhelm Pauck—German-American church historian and historical theologian in the field of Reformation studies
- Theodore W. Jennings, Jr.—Professor of Biblical and Constructive Theology
- Laurel C. Schneider, Theologian with special interests in queer and intersectional perspectives with focus on concepts such as multiplicity and polydoxy

=== Notable current faculty ===
- Ken Stone—Professor of Bible, Culture and Hermeneutics
- John H. Thomas—Visiting Professor in Church Ministries
- Susan Brooks Thistlethwaite—author, former CTS president, syndicated columnist, ordained minister, activist, theologian, and translator of the Bible
- Rachel Mikva—Rabbi Herman E. Schaalman Associate Professor of Jewish Studies, director of the Center for Jewish, Christian and Islamic Studies
- Rami Nashashibi—community organizer and American Muslim activist who co-founded and continues to serve as the executive director of the Inner-City Muslim Action Network (IMAN)

=== Notable alumni ===
- Jesse Jackson Sr.—American civil rights activist, politician, and Baptist minister. (M.Div., 2000)
- John W. de Gruchy—Anti-Apartheid leader, Karl Barth Prize award recipient, former Robert Selby Taylor Professor of Christian Studies at University of Cape Town (South Africa), and an Extraordinary Professor at the University of Stellenbosch.
- Jeremiah Wright, Jr.—Pastor Emeritus of Trinity United Church of Christ, and black liberation theologian. (1982, D.D.)
- G. Campbell Morgan—British evangelist, preacher and a leading Bible scholar (D.D., 1902)
- Richard A. Jensen—American theologian, author, and Carlson Professor of Homiletics Emeritus at Lutheran School of Theology at Chicago
- Abraham Kahikina Akaka—American clergyman (1955)
- Philo Carpenter—Illinois' first pharmacist, managing director of the Chicago Bible Society, abolitionist, school board member, board of health member, organizer of the Relief and Aid Society, and co-organizer of American Anti-Slavery Society.
- Otis Moss III—Pastor of Chicago's Trinity United Church of Christ (D.Min., 2012)
- Jared Maurice Arter—Former slave, Virginia school superintendent, author. (B.D.)
- Dean Drayton—Geophysicist, Uniting Church in Australia (UCA) minister and president, United Theological College lecturer, author, and aboriginal advocate. (Ph.D.)
- Daniel Day Williams—Process theologian, professor, and author. He served on the joint faculty of the University of Chicago and the Chicago Theological Seminary, and later at Union Theological Seminary in New York City. (D.D., 1966)
- Mercy Oduyoye—Methodist theologian known for her work in African women's theology. (2001, D.D.)
- Larry Pickens—United Methodist pastor, and ecumenical activist (Ph.D.)
- Adam Kotsko—American writer, theologian, religious scholar, and translator, working chiefly in the field of political theology. (M.A, 2005; Ph.D., 2009)
- Alden Ewart Matthews—Chinese: 麻安德; Pinyin: Má Āndé; Congregational missionary to China and Japan.
- James Henry Breasted—American archaeologist and historian
- Delbert Tibbs—Wrongfully convicted ex-felon, writer and anti-death penalty activist
- Wilhelm Pauck—German-American church historian and historical theologian in the field of Reformation studies
- Donald G. Bloesch—American evangelical theologian
- William Leonard Rowe—Professor emeritus of philosophy at Purdue University who specializes in the philosophy of religion
- Emily C. Hewitt—Former Judge and Chief Judge of the United States Court of Federal Claims. (D.Min.)
- Syngman Rhee—Former Moderator of the General Assembly of the Presbyterian Church, civil rights activist, teacher
- Jesse Jackson Jr.—National co-chair, Barack Obama 2008 presidential campaign; former U.S. Representative for the Illinois 2nd District. (M.Div., 1988)
- Daniel Crosby Greene—First missionary of the American Board to Japan, member of the committee for the translation of the New Testament into the Japanese and Chinese languages
- Daniel Patte—Professor of Religious Studies and of New Testament & Early Christianity at Vanderbilt University (Th.D., 1971 from The Center of Jewish-Christian Studies with André LaCocque)
- Rob Oliphant—Member of Canadian Parliament
