= Circle of Concerned African Women Theologians =

Pan-African ecumenical organization

- Formation: 1989; 37 years ago
- Founder: Mercy Oduyoye
- Type: academic association
- Location: African continent
- Continental Coordinator: Musa Dube (July 2019 –July 2024)
- Continental Coordinator: Molly Manyonganise (July 2024 - Present)

The Circle of Concerned African Women Theologians is a pan-African ecumenical organization that supports scholarly research of African women theologians. The Circle mentors the next generation of African women theologians throughout their academic careers in order to counter the dearth of academic theological literature by African women. The Circle has chapters in more than a dozen countries across the African continent, as well as diaspora chapters in Europe and North America.

== History ==
The organization was formally established in 1989 at Trinity College in Legon, Ghana, with 79 founding members convened by the Ghanaian theologian Mercy Oduyoye. Oduyoye contends it informally began in 1976 when she invited female scholars of theology and religion to join the Ecumenical Association of Third World Theologians. However, quota limits hindered these activities, which gave a stimulus for ultimately establishing the Circle. The official launch in 1989 was as "a culmination of a decade-long work and the realisation that while women were the majority in faith-based organisations, they were visibly absent in religious leadership and academic study of religion." Oduyoye was working at the World Council of Churches at the time of founding. Hence, the group awarded the WCC its Appreciation of Partnership Award at its 5th pan-African conference in 2019 "because the WCC created the space in which the Circle of Concerned African Women Theologians was born and flourished."

The Circle has highlighted issues related to sexuality, including concerns around violence against women and the HIV/AIDS epidemic. It has published over 30 books by group authorship and several single-author monographs written by Circle members. The Circle was also instrumental in establishing a research center for women, religion and culture in Accra, Ghana, and a women's resource center in Limuru, Kenya. According to the World Council of Churches, the Circle has "contributed research and writing that has added immeasurably to the ecumenical movement, particularly in the area of gender justice."

In July 2019, the Circle celebrated its 30th anniversary at its 5th pan-African conference at the University of Botswana in Gaborone. The four-day conference was held on the theme "Mother Earth, Mother Africa in Religious Imagination" and was attended by scholars from 17 countries. At the anniversary celebration, founder Mercy Oduyoye noted that the Circle's first meeting was held in 1980, but that it was officially launched in 1989. At the time, Oduyoye said, there was only one woman serving as a representative in the synod of her church, even though 80 percent of the congregants in churches were women. Keynote speaker Puleng LenkaBula added that the work of the Circle did not only acknowledge "the evil of oppression in our societies, but also the injustice of colonialism of our bodies and of the earth." For LenkaBula, the Circle represents "a contestation and a call for justice, but also a path that feminist and womanist theologians came to shape the narratives that were often muted in church and society."

== Notable women ==
=== Botswana ===
- Musa W. Dube

=== Democratic Republic of the Congo (Zaire) ===
- Bernadette Mbuy Mbeya
- Munda Tsh Badibanga
- Farhi Chibalonza
- Nzebia Kalombo
- Seur Tundu-Kyalu Gertrude
- Pikini Mawika
- Agnes Meta-Kapitene

=== Eswatini (Swaziland) ===
- Joyce Tsibedze

=== Togo ===
Kasa Dovi

=== Ghana ===
- Elizabeth Amoah Tetteh
- Mercy Amba Oduyoye
- Theresa AD Acolatse
- Esther Acolaste
- Patience Dickson
- Rabiatu Amma
- Angelica Latse
- Araba Ata Sam
- Regina Ogbozo
- Sophia Dukar
- Esme Sereboo
- Gladys Osae Oddo
- Rachel Etrue Tette
- Hannah Quansah
- Helena Obu
- Paulina A Kumadey
- Rebecca Gamsah
- Dora Ofori-Owusu
- Victoria Brew
- Mable Morny
- Margaret L Quist

=== Kenya ===
- Musimbi Kanyoro
- Esther Mombo
- Nyambura Njoroge
- Teresia Mbari Hinga
- Mary Getui
- Philomena Njeri Mwaura
- Emily Onyango
- Elizabeth W. Mburu
- Anne Nkirote Kubai
- Eva Chipenda
- Damaris S. Parsitau
- Hannah W. Kinoti
- Hazel Ong'ayo Ayanga
- Eunice Kamaara
- Grace Wamue Ngare
- Rose Okeno
- Margaret Gecaga
- Josephine Gitome
- Ruth Muthei
- Susan Kilonzo
- Esha Faki Mwinyihaji
- Lydia Mwaniki
- Margaret Mwenda
- Loreen Maseno
- Emily Jeptepkeny Choge Kerama

=== Lesotho ===
- Aletta Mandoro
- Alima Machema

=== Malawi ===
- Fulata Moyo
- Isabel Apawo Phiri
- Rachel NyaGondwe Fiedler
- Christine Phiri

=== Namibia ===
- Wilhelmina Pingana Shikomba

=== Nigeria ===
- Teresa Okure
- Rosemary Edet
- Meg Umeagudosu
- Josephine Olagunju
- Rhoda Ada James
- Daisy Nwachuku
- Titilayo Mary Fabiyi

=== Sierra Leone ===
- Lloyda Fanusie

=== South Africa ===
- Brigalia Bam
- Puleng LenkaBula
- Sarojini Nadar
- Angelene Swart
- Christina Landman

=== Tanzania ===
- Ana Eva Makyao
- Anna Mghwira
- Rose Materu

=== Uganda ===
- Anne Nasimiyu Wasike
- Mable Kahweire

=== Zambia ===
- Peggy Mulambya-Kabonde
- Juliet S Matembo
- Omega Bula

=== Zimbabwe ===
- Chipo Mtombeni

==== Kenyan Women Clergy ====
- Emily Onyango
- Rose Okeno
- Teresia Wairimu
- Lucy Natasha
- Margaret Wanjiru
- Lydia Mwaniki
- Pauline Njiru
- Lydia Chemei
- Dorcas Chebet Juma
- Kathy Kiuna

== Associated organizations ==
- EATWOT
- Pan- African Women's Ecumenical Empowerment Network (PAWEEN)
