= Mary Getui =

Kenyan theologian (born 1959)

Mary Getui MBS
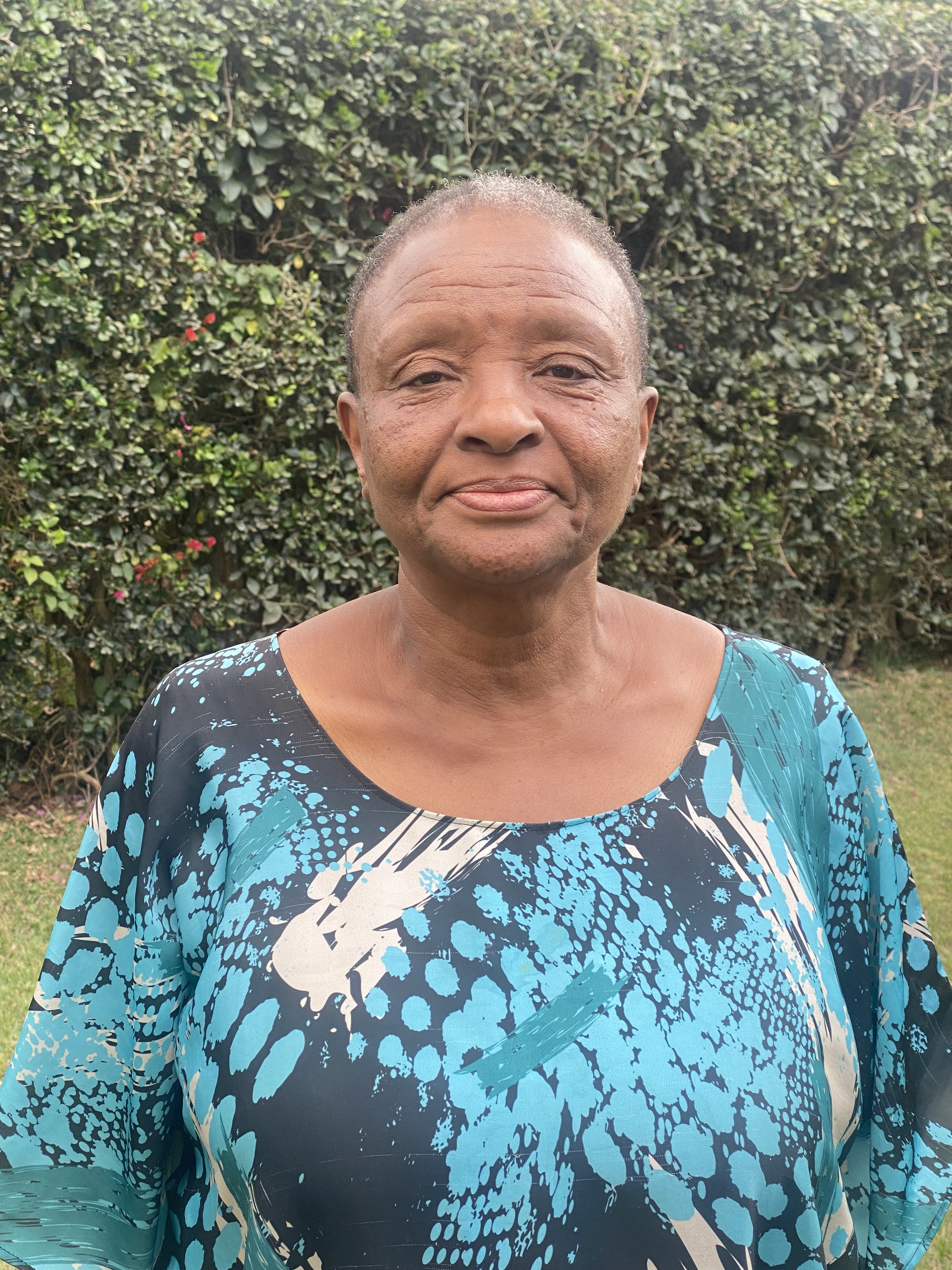
- Born: 1959 (age 66–67); Thika, Kenya
- Education: BA, MA University of Nairobi; PhD in Religious Education from Kenyatta University
- Occupations: Academic, professor
- Theological work
- Main interests: Theology, ethics, HIV/AIDS

Mary Getui MBS (born 1959) is a Kenyan theologian and Professor of Religious Studies at the Catholic University of Eastern Africa. She is a founding member of the Circle of Concerned African Women Theologians. In 2009, Getui was named a Moran of the Burning Spear. She was appointed as chair of the National Aids Control Council of Kenya that same year.

== Early life ==
In an interview about her work, Getui mentions that she was born in Thika, Kenya, and that her father was a Policeman. Getui is a member of the Seventh-day Adventist Church. She is married and has three children.

== Education and career ==
Getui notes that she went to school in Kisii as a child, and then attended St Mary’s Nyabururu Girls Primary School and Loreto Convent Limuru Girls High School. Getui also mentions that she was interested in becoming a teacher from an early age.

Getui graduated from the University of Nairobi with a Bachelor of Arts degree in Education in 1983. She then taught for two years at Upper Hill Secondary School, a boarding school in Kenya, where she taught Religion. Getui then began lecturing in the Religious Studies department in Kenyatta University. Thanks to a Kenyatta University staff development scholarship, she completed a masters of arts degree in religious studies from the University of Nairobi in 1987. She continued to advance her studies while teaching, and earned a PhD in Religious Education from Kenyatta University in 1994. She became an associate professor, and by 1996, was the chair of the Religious Studies Department at Kenyatta University. In 1999, while serving as chair, she co-led the planning team for a seminal conference of the African Association for the Study of Religion (AASR); the conference, the first held by the AASR in Africa, was hosted by the Religious Studies Department at Kenyatta University. She later became a full professor at Catholic University of Eastern Africa, where she teaches Religious Studies.

Getui joined the Ecumenical Association of Third World Theologians (EATWOT) and was a member of the EATWOT Women's Commission. In 1996, she was elected the African regional coordinator for EATWOT. Much of her scholarship has centered on gender issues in Christian theology and theological education. Her essay on theological education in the Seventh-day Adventist Church was included in the Handbook of Theological Education in Africa, edited by Isabel Apawo Phiri and Dietrich Werner and published by the World Council of Churches.

By presidential appointment, Getui became chair for the National Aids Control Council of Kenya in June 2009. The council was established in 1999, when the then-president Daniel arap Moi declared the HIV/Aids epidemic to be a national disaster. Noting that gender inequities contributed to the spread of the virus, and negatively impacted people living with HIV/Aids, the council made mainstreaming gender issues a priority in its work, beginning in the early 2000s.

== Circle of Concerned African Women Theologians membership ==
In 1989, Getui was part of a small planning group of African women academics with degrees in religion or theology, led by Mercy Oduyoye, that organized the inaugural continental gathering of African Women theologians in Ghana in 1989. At this gathering, the Circle of Concerned African Women Theologians (The Circle) was launched, to support the continuing development of African women's theology. The Circle has both local and regional chapters, which gather regularly and engage in discussion, research and publication. Getui joined the East African Circle representing Kenya, Uganda and Tanzania upon its formation after the 1989 convocation, and was active in the local Kenyatta University Circle, becoming the coordinator in 1992. The region was later reorganized and the Kenyan Circle was established as a separate chapter.

Getui played a major role in organizing two conferences for the Circle, in 1994 and 1996. In 1994, she helped organize the Southern and East African Zonal meeting, held in Nairobi. In 1996, a continental gathering of the Circle was held in Nairobi, and Getui was the chair of the local organizing committee. With Grace Wamue, she co-edited a volume of papers published by the Circle, entitled Violence Against Women: Reflections by Kenyan Women Theologians. In 2002, she co-edited, with Hazel Ayanga, a book entitled Conflicts in Africa: A Women Response, published by the Kenyan Chapter of the Circle.

== Awards and recognition ==
In 2009, Getui was made a Moran of the Burning Spear; this is one of Kenya's highest awards, given by the president to individuals in recognition of distinguished public service. Getui was given an honorary doctorate by DePaul University in 2012.

== Selected works ==
- Getui, M. (2022). Land and Spirituality in the African Socio-Cultural Context. ONTENT, 21.
- Churu, B. W., & Getui, M. N. (2021). Community on Mission in a World Wounded by Poverty: A Call to Solidarity, Vulnerability and Liberation. Ecclesial Futures, 2(1), 6-25.
- Getui, M., & Richard, G. K. (2020). Masculinity and public space in the Greco-Roman period: Implications for Africa today. Stellenbosch theological journal, 6(1), 27-39.
- Getui, M.N. (1998). Zelophehad’s Daughters in Kenya. Women in the Bible, 26, 52-59.

=== Co-edited works ===
- Getui, M. (2024). African Culture in 21st century: Persistence, Opportunities, Challenges and Prospects. AMECEA Gaba Publication-CUEA Press. ISBN 9789966836724
- Getui, M. N., Churu, B. W., & Susin, L. C. (2008). Spirituality for Another Possible World. Twaweza Communications. ISBN 9789966724441
- Getui, M. N. (Ed.). (2005). Responsible Leadership in Marriage and Family. Acton Publishers. ISBN 9966888063
- Getui, M.N. & J. K. Mugambi. (2004). Religions in Eastern Africa Under Globalization. Acton Publishers. ISBN 996688873X
- Getui, M. N. & Musyoni, W. (2003).Overcoming Violence: A Faith Based Response. National Council of Churches Publication.
- Getui, M. N., & Ayanga, H. (Eds.). (2002). Conflicts in Africa: A Women Response. Circle of Concerned African Women Theologians, Kenya Chapter.: Faith Institute of Councelling, Nairobi, Kenya. ISBN 996698884X
- Getui, M.N. & Theuri, M.M. (2002) Quests for Abundant Life in Africa. Acton Publishers. ISBN 996688839X
- Getui, M. N., Holter, K., & Zinkuratire, V. (2001). Interpreting the Old Testament in Africa. Acton Publishers. ISBN 0820449784
- Getui, M. N., Maluleke, S. T., & Ukpong, J. S. (Eds.). (2001). Interpreting the New Testament in Africa. Acton Publishers. ISBN 9966888020
- Getui, M.N. & Kanyandago, P. (1999). From Violence to Peace: A Challenge for African Christianity. Acton Publishers. ISBN 9966888136
- Getui, M. N. & A H de Jong (1999). Ethnicity: Blessing or Curse. Paulines Publications Africa. ISBN 9966214577
- Getui, M.N., Obeng, E.A. & Mugambi J.N.K. (1999). Theology of Reconstruction: Exploratory Essays. Acton Publishers. ISBN 9966888012
- Getui, M.N. (1998). Theological Method and Aspects of Worship in African Christianity. Acton Publishers. ISBN 9966888969
- Getui, M. N. & Wamue, G. N. (1996). Violence against women: Reflections by Kenyan women theologians. Acton Publishers. ISBN 9966888489
