= Hazel Ong'ayo Ayanga =

Kenyan theologian

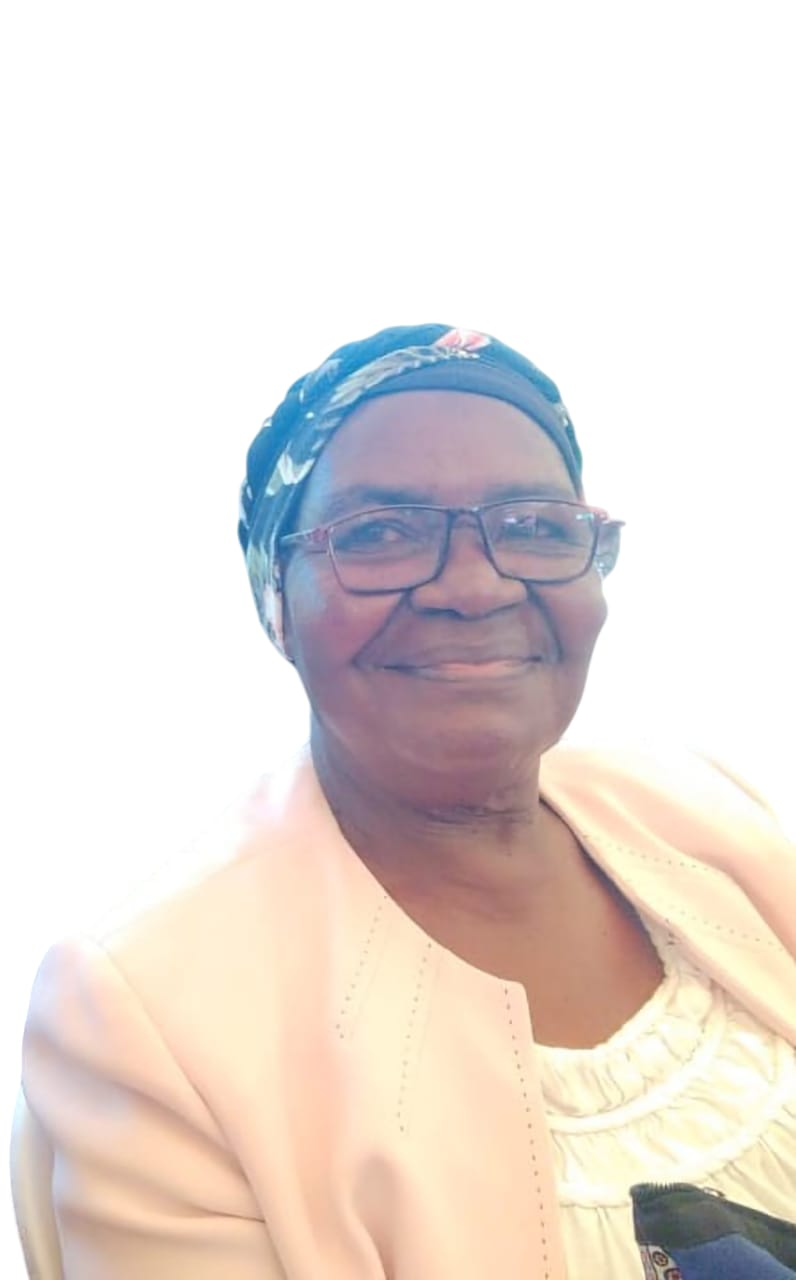
- Hazel Ong'ayo Ayanga
- Born: 10 January 1952 (age 74)
- Occupation: Professor of Religious Studies

Academic background
- Education: Moi University

Academic work
- Discipline: African Theology
- Sub-discipline: Feminist Theology
- School or tradition: Anglican
- Institutions: Professor of Religious Studies, Moi University
- Main interests: Care and empowerment of orphans, vulnerable children and women affected by HIV/AIDS

Hazel Ong'ayo Ayanga is a Kenyan theologian whose work focuses on the care and empowerment of orphans, vulnerable children and women affected by HIV/AIDS. She is an associate professor of Religious Studies at Moi University, Kenya and also researches spirituality in clinical settings, religion and social change in Africa and the centrality of ritual in human life. She has published over twenty peer-reviewed articles and coauthored several book chapters and edited volumes.

== Early life and education ==
Hazel Ayanga was born on 10 January 1952 to John Ayanga and the late Rita Ayanga, at the village of Luanda, in Vihiga County, Kenya. She is a member of the Anglican Church of Kenya.

Ayanga earned Bachelor's and Master's of Arts degrees from the University of Nairobi, Kenya and attained her PhD in Religious Studies at Moi University. Her post-doctoral studies were at Yale University. Her areas of research are on the care and empowerment of orphans, vulnerable children and women affected by HIV and AIDS, spirituality in clinical settings, religion and social change in Africa and the centrality of ritual in human life.

== Career ==
Ayanga started her career as a senior librarian at Kenya National Library Services in Nairobi from 1975 to 1983 and later joined Kenyatta University as an assistant librarian in 1987. She was employed by Moi University in 1989 as a tutorial fellow in the department of philosophy, religion and theology and rose through the ranks to become an associate professor of religious studies in the same department and has taught many courses at the university such as: Religion and Society, Phenomenology of Religion and History of Christian Doctrine, among others. She was the head of the department of Philosophy, Religion and Theology, Moi University between 2003 and 2005 and the East African regional representative for the African Association for the Study of Religions (AASR). She has also been an external examiner at several universities among them; the University of Nairobi (2004 to 2005), Kenyatta University (2010 to 2013) and Masinde Muliro University of Science and Technology, Kenya (2020 to date). She served as the coordinator of the Circle of Concerned African Women Theologians (the Circle), East African Region from 2007 to 2019.

Ayanga was awarded a Research Fellowship (African Christianity project) by the Centre for the Study of Christianity in the Non-Western World (currently The Centre for the Study of World Christianity), School of Divinity, University of Edinburgh in 1996. She won a Course Competition Award from the Centre for Theology and Natural Sciences (CTNS) in Berkeley, California in 2003 and the Indiana University Health and Values grant in 2019.

== Research and writing ==
Ayanga's research and writing span religion, culture and social change emphasizing social issues like gender, poverty, HIV/AIDS, marginalization and empowerment of the vulnerable women and children. For instance, in her article titled "Voice of the voiceless: The legacy of the Circle of Concerned African Women Theologians," she considers the legacy of the Circle of Concerned African Women Theologians as being the voice of the voiceless women in Africa. In this article, she argues that the Circle voices (figuratively and literally) women's issues through research and publications and by providing safe spaces for women to be themselves and to share their stories thus creating reconstructive and transformative theologies. Telling stories gives voice to women's lived experiences and makes women, their lives and experiences audible and visible. She shows how the Circle, through research and publications, created awareness of the woman's face of HIV/AIDS in Africa where women are victims of negative cultural and religious beliefs and remain vulnerable and susceptible to HIV infections.

She also wrote on "AIDS, Science and Religion in Africa" where she views HIV/AIDS as not just a medical problem in Africa, but also a socio-economic, psychological, cultural and spiritual problem since the menace is associated with intersectional factors such as gender disparity, poverty, attitudes towards those infected and affected, beliefs and cultural practices which influence the management of the disease in the continent. AIDS in Africa must therefore be understood within the context of African cultural beliefs which are often understood and transmitted through religious teachings and ritual practices of the community with women and children being the most vulnerable to HIV infections. She called for a holistic approach in the management of AIDS where religion and science work together. Together with other African women theologians like Teresia Mbari Hinga, Philomena Njeri Mwaura and Anne Kubai, among others, Ayanga implored on religious communities to address stigmatization of women infected and affected by AIDS and encouraged these institutions to empower women and girls.

Ayanga further advocated for the role of women in church and society and the need for contextual approach to the concerns of African women in the church. In her article titled, "Contextual Challenges to African Women in Mission," she emphasizes the pivotal role of women in the propagation of the gospel and calls for the recognition of women in mission and missiology. Whereas she problematizes the poor contextualization of the missiological context and environment by the early missionaries to Africa, she acknowledges that these early missionaries and others from different parts of the globe, "recognized that reaching women and improving their status would lead to the transformation of whole communities. This is the basis of all Circle of Concerned African Women Theologians Activities: the recognition of the centrality of women in church and society." She encourages women to be at the forefront in finding and formulating appropriate theological responses to the contextual challenges they encounter and advocates for the training of women in theology and other academic disciplines in Africa.

== Selected works ==
- Ayanga, H. O. (2017). Contextual Challenges to African Women in Mission. International Review of Mission, 106(2), 295–306.
- Ayanga, H. O. (2016). Voice of the Voiceless: The Legacy of the Circle of Concerned African Women Theologians. Verbum et Ecclesia, 37(2), 1–6.
- Ayanga, H. O. (2016). Women in African Christianity. In Phiri, Isabel Apawo; Werner, Dietrich; Kaunda, Chammah; Owino, Kennedy; Asamoah-Gyadu, Kwabena; Djomhue, Priscille; Biri, Kudzai; Kalengyo, Edison (eds.). Anthology of African Christianity, Fortress Press, 944–948.
- Ayanga, H. (2015). African cosmologies past and present. In Eisen, A. & Laderman, G. (eds.),Science, Religion and Society. London: Routledge, 325–331.
- Ayanga, H. (2015). AIDS, Science, and Religion in Africa. In Eisen, A. & Laderman, G. (eds.), Science, Religion and Society. London: Routledge, 649–653.
- Ayanga, H. (2012). Inspired and gendered: The hermeneutical challenge of teaching gender in Kenya. In Hendriks, H. J., Mouton, E., Hansen, L. & le Roux, E. Men in the Pulpit Women in the Pew: Addressing Gender Inequality in Africa. Stellenbosch, S.A: Sun Press, 85–92.
- Ayanga, H. O. (2011). Some Preliminary Notes on Gender, Culture and Theology. Hekima Review, (44), 8–16.
- Ayanga, H. (2008). Waging Peace: The Role of Religion in Reconciliation Process. Religion and Politics in Africa, 112–123.
- Ayanga, H. (2008). Religio-cultural challenges in women's fight against HIV/AIDS in Africa. In Hinga, T. M., Kubai, A. N., Mwaura, P. & Ayanga, H. O. (eds.). Women, religion and HIV/AIDS in Africa: Responding to ethical and theological challenges, Cluster Publications, 34–48.
- Ayanga, H. (2005). Challenges to Mission in Contemporary Africa. Maarifa (Eldoret, Kenya), 1(1), 51–58.
- Getui, M. N., & Ayanga, H. (Eds.). (2002). Conflicts in Africa: A Women Response. Circle of Concerned African Women Theologians, Kenya Chapter.
- Ayanga, H. O. (1996). "Violence against women in African oral literature as portrayed in proverbs." In Wamue, G. & Getui, M. (eds.). Violence Against Women: Reflections by Kenyan Women Theologians. Nairobi: Acton Publishers, 13–20.

== Co-authored works ==
- Simion, K., Koech, J., & Ayanga, H. (2022). "An Investigation of Church Based Peace Building Models in Selected Churches in Kericho County." British Journal of Multidisciplinary and Advanced Studies, 3(1), 1–10. doi: 10.37745/bjmas.2022.0008
- Kamaara, E., Nyongesa, P., Ayanga, H., Choge-Kerama, J.E., Chelagat, D., Koech, J.K., Mraja, M., Chemorion, K.E., Mothaly, J., Kiyiapi, L., Katwa, J., Odunga, J. & James Lemons, J. (2019). “Hospital-based Spiritual Care for Mothers of Neonates at RMBH in Eldoret, Kenya: A Situational Analysis”, Health and Social Care Chaplaincy, Vol. 7(2), 145–167.
- Maua, A. C., Ayanga, H., & Kahiga, J. (2020). Christian Teachings on Marriage and Its Impact on Customary Marriage among the Iteso of North Teso. African Journal of Education, Science and Technology, 5(4), 258–267.
- Rutto, F., Ayanga, H., & Ngure, S. (2020). The Social Impact of Western Christianity on Marakwet Traditional Funeral Rites. African Journal of Education, Science and Technology, 5(4), 278–289.
- Christopher, S. K., Ayanga, H., & Choge, E. (2019) A Synthesized Nandi Anglican Ng’anyet Ritual: A Paradigm Shift In A Multi Religious World. International Journal of Innovative Research and Advanced Studies (IJIRAS), 6 (3), 98- 103.
- Nyongesa, P., Kamaara, E., Ayanga, H. O., Mothaly, J., Akim, S. P., Ivy, S., & Lemons, J. (2019). Integrating Spiritual Care into Maternity Care at a University Teaching and Referral Hospital in Eldoret, Kenya: Challenges, Lessons and Way Forward. Health & Social Care Chaplaincy, 7(2), 168–215.
