= Omega Bula =

Omega Chilufya Makumba Bula

Personal life
- Notable work(s): Ecumenical leadership Gender, Racial, Economic and Ecological justice
- Occupation: Lay theologian, Ecumenical leader

Religious life
- Religion: Anglican Christian
- Church: United Church of Canada

Senior posting
- Organization: World Council of Churches United Church of Canada All Africa Conference of Churches Circle of Concerned African Women Theologians Association of Christian Lay Centres in Africa

Omega Chilufya Makumba Bula was a Zambian theologian, ecumenical leader and advocate for racial, gender, economic, ecological, and social justice in Zambia and Africa. Bula served in several religious and international organizations, including the United Church of Canada (UCC), the World Council of Churches, the All Africa Conference of Churches, and other ecumenical groups and organizations. She was involved in several local ministries in her home church and mentored younger women. She wrote and taught an inclusive liberation theology and a just economic system, challenging capitalism, patriarchy, and environmental pollution. Bula was a matriarch of the Circle of Concerned African Women Theologians.

== Ecumenical work ==
Bula grew up during the colonial period in Africa, so her theology was influenced by "her historical, religio-cultural, and economic context".

Bula was the regional secretary for Southern Africa and Gender Justice in the United Church of Canada's (UCC) Division of World Outreach. She was the first General council minister for racial justice. She was mandated to implement the provisions of the Anti-Racism policy of the United Church. Bula asserts that even though the policy is significant in acknowledging and condemning racism, application of the policy for transformation of society is not guaranteed due to the multifaceted dimensions of racism. She was the Executive minister of the Justice Global and Ecumenical Relations (JGER), and Partners in Mission units (PIM) departments in the UCC. She contributed to the formation of the Partner Council, which was an important part of designing the Principles of Global Partnership. Bula was a member of the Roundtable for Specialized Ministries, which provided financial support for the women's program.

She engaged with the World Alliance of Reformed Churches and the World Communion of Reformed Churches (WCRC). She focused on matters of gender equality and economic and environmental justice. Bula was an advisor at the 24th General Assembly in Accra, Ghana, in 2004. She was one of the four panelists at the International Ecumenical Peace Convocation (IEPC) being held in Kingston, Jamaica, in 2011. She was part of the WCC delegation that had an ecumenical solidarity visit to Sudan in 2008. Bula was the team leader for the ecumenical team that visited Zibambwe in 2005 sponsored by the WCC.

Bula worked with the World Council of Churches' Ecumenical School on Governance, Economics and Management for an Economy of Life. In 2005, she was appointed to Commission of the Churches on Diakonia and Development in the WCC. She was a member of the Ecumenical Panel on the New International Financial and Economic Architecture at WCC. Bula advocated for application of Christian principles and theology in creation of just global economic systems that are not exploitative of society and the environment. She applies feminist and intersectional perspectives to promote just economies that are inclusive of the socio-economically marginalized, care for the environment, and enhance gender justice. In her ecumenical engagements at the WCC, Bula emphasized the strategic significance of engaging men in the pursuit of gender justice, fighting gender-based violence, and disease pandemics like HIV/AIDS.

Bula was program director at Mindolo Ecumenical Foundation in Kitwe, Zambia, and founding member of the Association of Christian Lay Centers in Africa. She is among African ecumenical leaders and theologians who through African reflections and actions have contributed to global ecumenism.

Bula was program director at the All Africa Conference of Churches' Women's Desk in Nairobi. She facilitated the laity formation program at the Women's Desk. Bula designed a handbook and training process on economic literacy, an initiative that educated women in rural communities about the role of global actors in causing poverty. She trained economic literacy facilitators to educate lay people on how to contribute to community development. She emphasized and endorsed the potential and role of lay people in social transformation. Bula was critical of the implications of structural adjustment programs implemented by the World Bank and International Monetary Fund in the 1980s and 1990s on African countries. She educated women on how foreign economic policies impacted economies, devalued local currencies, worsened poverty levels, weakened local industries and public social services, increased national debt, and created cyclic national dependency on aid. She taught economic strategies and economic justice to overcome debt and financial crises, which hinder trade, growth, community development, and add to the challenging experiences of women in Africa. Bula encouraged unity of women (sisterhood solidarity) to resist oppression, pursue justice, and inspire others to take action on matters affecting women's lives.

After her retirement, she worked with members of her church in Zambia and Canada to host a two-week children's camp each August, named “Camp Chipembi.” She established a sustainable farm and guesthouse to provide educational and entrepreneurial support for members of her community. In the WCC news, Fulata Moyo states that Bula mentored her by "providing stepping stones for Moyo to reach her highest potential in serving the God of justice".

== Broad scholarship ==
Bula was a matriarch of the Circle of Concerned African Women Theologians in Zambia. She developed liberating theologies for the African woman in Zambia in pursuit of social and economic justice. Her theological contributions match those of Mbuya Nehanda in demonstrating the resistance of African women against all forms of injustice through contextualization and local action. Bula's writing and ecumenical engagements contribute to the development of African feminist liberation theologies. She applies local contexts in Biblical studies to make Christian theology, principles, and values locally significant and practical in pursuit of social, gender, and ecological justice. She underscores the role of churches and ecumenical organizations as social institutions, voices of resistance, and communities of faith, in challenging systemic injustices, enhancing community empowerment, and development. Localization and glocalization ensure liberation begins at the grassroots level, liberating communities before extending to regional and continental spheres. Bula's theological discourse was shaped by historical, religio-cultural, and economic happenings, which affected Zambia, local communities, women, and the natural environment. She pioneered an inclusive theology where scripture, myths, and experiences become empowering tools for economic justice. She envisioned a just economic system that dignifies people, without discrimination and exploitation. Bula's liberation theology addressed capitalism and the ethos of exploitation, over-consumption, and discrimination, patriarchy, and environmental degradation. In Kenya, Zambia, and Canada, Bula was committed to shaping the church as a faithful agent of transformation mandated with exposing injustice and pursuing justice in the world.

Bula died of heart complications from cancer on January 31, 2023, in Lusaka, Zambia.

== Publications ==
- Bula, O. (1992). Women in Mission: Participating in Healing. International Review of Mission, 81: 247–251. https://doi.org/10.1111/j.1758-6631.1992.tb02301.x
- Bula, O. (1993). "Transformation of Society by Laity Formation." The Ecumenical Review, 45: 432–436. https://doi.org/10.1111/j.1758-6623.1993.tb02890.x
- Bula, O. (2002). Images of Africa: Challenging negative stereotypes in media and society. Making Waves, 2(4).
- Bula, O. (2005). Pedagogical implications of the Accra Confession. Reformed world, 55(3), 251–256.
- Park, S., Ortega Suárez, O., & Bula, O. (2005). Alternatives are possible! Reformed world, 55(3), 279–292.
- Bula, O. (2005). Reformed faith and the rejection of economic injustice: Essays on practising the Accra Confession. Reformed World, 55, 187–197
- Bula, O. (2010). Living faithfully in the context of empire: Challenges and opportunities. In D. Visser (Ed.), That they may all be one: Celebrating the World Communion of Reformed Churches (pp. 86–78). World Alliance of Reformed Churches.
- Bula, O. (2014). Threat to Women's Rights and Dignity: Tourism and Gender in Africa. Deconstructing tourism: who benefits?, 111–125.
