= Rosemary Edet =

Nigerian Catholic nun and feminist theologian (1935–1993)

Reverend sister Rosemary Nkoyo Edet

Personal life
- Born: 1935 Nigeria
- Died: 1993 (aged 57–58)
- Notable idea: Feminist Liberation Theology Contextualization of African theology Gender Equality
- Education: University of Calabar St.Pauls University

Religious life
- Religion: Christianity
- Denomination: Catholicism
- Order: Nun
- Church: Roman Catholic Church, Nigeria
- Profession: Feminist Theologian; New Testament Scholar; Author; Educator; Gender equality advocate

Rosemary Nkoyo Edet (1935–1993) was a Nigerian member of the congregation of the Handmaids of the Holy Child Jesus, a Catholic religious order, the Catholic co-founder of the Circle of Concerned African Women Theologians and one of the first African Catholic Feminist sisters. She was a feminist theologian and Christian advocate for women's liberation, empowerment and ecclesial leadership. She has written on gender studies, theological contextualisation, and African theology. The book African Literature, Mother Earth, and Religion was dedicated to her, in recognition of her advocacy for women's liberation.

== Personal life and career ==
Born in Nigeria in 1935, Edet was the daughter of Chief Edet Akpan Udo and Theresa Ansa Odo of Nigeria. She earned a PhD and was appointed a lecturer in the Department of Philosophy and Religious Studies at the University of Calabar in Nigeria. She specialized in New Testament Studies, researching and writing on feminism, church, gender and culture, inculturation, and Catholicism.

During her 32 years of her service within the congregation of the Handmaids of the Holy Child Jesus (HHCJ), she worked in the education apostolate of the Catholic Church in Nigeria. Edet was an educator in various schools and the Principal of Holy Child Teacher training colleges in Oron and Ifuho, at St. Theresa's Secondary School in Edem Ekpat. She was the Pioneer Principal of Assumption Girls Juniorate in Ndon Ebom, and Tutor at Holy Child Secondary School Marian Hill in Calabar.

She died in 1993.

== Sisterhood ==
On 25 January 1957, on the feast of the conversion of the Paul the Apostle, she received the Postulate Hood in the congregation of the Handmaids of the Holy Child Jesus. In 1961, she made her first profession, and her final profession in 1970. Her silver jubilee was celebrated on 15 January 1986, and she was elected to lead the congregation of Handmaids of the Holy Child Jesus on 18 December 1989. As a Catholic sister and influenced by HHCJ's mission for women education, empowerment, apostolic ministry, participatory leadership, respect and justice, she joined hands with other sisters and developed a theological language to give women new authority and autonomy, and make them climb the ladder of ecclesial leadership positions. The sisters proposed using scriptural texts, exploring the liberating praxis of Christ, the apostolic authority of Mary, and Papal announcements to advance the argument for women’s proper dignity and authority within religious settings. Edet advocates for women's liberation, justice, political freedom and empowerment in the church, and the development of a new conception of the Church as communion, family and people of God, and a fresh appropriation of the "mind of Christ".

== Liberation theology ==
Edets' scholarly work focuses on the Roman Catholic church and gender studies, particularly the Catholic Church in Nigeria, and various women's organizations she has served like the Circle of Concerned African Women Theologians, the Ecumenical Association of Third World Theologians, and the Learned Women Association. She contributed to liberation theology through publications that demonstrate her efforts at appropriating theological issues about women, church, culture, rituals, inculturation, contextualization, and religious relations concerning their biblical bases and implication for society. She confronted contemporary challenges by discussing critical topics such as the marginalization of women, harmful cultural practices like female genital mutilation, and the failure to fully implement international agreements like the 1995 Beijing Declaration's 35% affirmative action for women's participation in nation-building. She condemns the cultural and religious processes that widows undergo which belittle their dignity. Edet argues that all forms of unfair and inhuman treatment of women for any reason are opposed to Christian principles of love and life. As a New Testament scholar at the University of Calabar, her feminist theology of liberation is inspired by the Pauline letters diversity and communality where all members have equal dignity and roles. Her liberation theology fosters coexistence, intercultural dialogue, the dignity of women, and breaking down patriarchal systems that perpetuate inequality, aggression, and insecurity in society, particularly Nigeria. She unfolds a relational Christological identity of Jesus as a friend, liberator, healer, and life-giver who offers the fullness of life for all humanity, regardless of gender, sex, or class. She deconstructs the normative patriarchal norms, redefines women’s self-identity, and fosters inclusivity and equal partnership within pastoral framework that actively contribute to societal transformation. She calls for inclusive theology arguing that exclusion of women is based on unsound doctrinal foundations. Edet champions inclusion of women in the Roman Catholic ministry as its traditional and colonial system of exclusive male leadership structure supports and reinforces the traditional gender based societal roles, perpetuates male dominance, and ignores the religious leadership of African Women in the same traditional culture, and women's historical contributions to early Christianity. The book "African Literature, Mother Earth, and Religion" was dedicated to her, in recognition of her advocacy for women’s liberation, theological contributions, and commitment to the Circle of Concerned African Women Theologians.

== Church and society ==
Edet placed the church at the centre of society not only as a spiritual institution but also as a social institution with the duty to address social problems like discrimination, injustice, and ethical aberration meted out on women. Her theology addresses the Church’s role in societal needs, women and human liberation, interreligious relations, and inclusive cultural and social issues. Edet argued that the Church would find it challenging to respond to the challenges of the immediate society without a contextualized Christian theology. To Edet, theologians must depart from Western-oriented theologization and evangelisation which cause cultural alienation, cultural domination and assimilation rather than cultural exchange.

== Professional associations ==
She was a member of the Ecumenical Association of Third World Theologians (EATWOT), a founding member of the Circle of Concerned African Women Theologians, the Catholic Church and a notable Catholic Order, and member of the Learned Women Association.

== Selected works ==
- Edet, R. N. (1992). Christianity and African women's rituals. The will to arise: Women, tradition, and the church in Africa, 25-39.
- Edet, R.N (1991). "Christ and the Nigerian Womanhood" in Life, Women and Culture: Theological Reflections: Proceedings of the National Conference of a Circle of African Women Theologians. (Lagos: African Heritage Research and Publications)
- Edet R (1990). "Leadership in the New Testament-Resurrection/Feminist Per- spective". The Nigerian Journal of Theology 1(5) April, 93-101.
- Edet RN (1989). New Roles, New Challenges for African Women. In Virginia Fabella & Dolorita Martinez (eds) Third World Women Doing Theology. Port Harcourt: EATWOT Publications.
- Edet, R. (1989). Woman and Ministry in Africa. A Voices the Wilderness KAIROS: Voices from the Third World, 12(2), 79-103.
- Edet RN (1988). Church Women of Africa: A Theological Community. In Virginia Fabella & Mercy A. Oduyoye (eds) With Passion and Compassion. Maryknoll/NY: Orbis Books.
- Ecumenical Association of Third World Theologians. Women's Commission. (1988). With passion and compassion: Third world women doing theology: Reflections from the women's commission of the ecumenical association of third world theologians. Orbis Books.
- Edet R (1988). "The Parables of the Ten Virgins", Gospel Parables in African Context (ed) Justin S. Ukpong. Port Harcourt: CIWA Press, 53-58.
- Edet, R.N (1984). The Resilience of Religious Tradition in the Dramas of Wole Soyinka and James Ene Henshaw. Catholic University of America.
