= Hannah Wangeci Kinoti =

Kenyan African feminist theologian (born 1941)

Hannah Wangeci Kìnoti
- Born: 1 August 1941; Nyeri County, Kenya
- Died: 30 April 2001 (aged 59)
- Occupation: Lecturer
- Spouse: George Kìnoti
- Children: Five

Academic background
- Education: Alliance Girls High School, Makerere College School, College of the University of East Africa
- Alma mater: College of the University of East Africa

Academic work
- Discipline: Educationist, religious studies scholar, theologian
- Institutions: University of Nairobi
- Notable works: African Communitarian Ethics

Hannah Wangeci Kìnoti (1 August 1941 – 30 April 2001) was a Kenyan feminist theologian and a member of the Circle of Concerned African Women Theologians. Kìnoti was an African Ethicist and Religious Studies Scholar with over fifty publications. She was a founding member of Wajibu Journal, created in 1985, focusing on religion, African values, morality, politics and culture. Kìnoti was the first female chairperson in the Department of Philosophy and Religious Studies at the University of Nairobi.

== Early life and education ==
Hannah Kìnoti was born on August 1, 1941, in Nyeri District (now Nyeri County). She was the lastborn of five siblings in the Ruben and Ruth Gathii family. She grew up in the Scottish Presbyterian Church, which later became the Presbyterian Church of East Africa. She became a Christian at the age of 15 and was shaped by her church's evangelism. She later became a lay preacher in the Methodist Church in Kenya.

== Career ==
After graduating as a teacher, Kìnoti taught Bible knowledge, English, divinity, and literature at Kenya High School for five years. She became a tutorial fellow in 1974, an assistant Lecturer in 1982 at the University of Nairobi, where she earned her doctorate in the Department of Philosophy and Religious Studies with the dissertation "Aspects of Gikuyu Traditional Morality" in 1983 and was hired as a lecturer in 1984. She was also an adjunct lecturer at the Jesuit School of Theology at Hekima College and Kenyatta University. Kinoti served as an Associate Professor in the Department of Philosophy and Religious Studies until her sudden death in April 2001. As a professor and a lay preacher, she spoke on various ethical, spiritual, moral, and social topics.

Kìnoti was an ethicist, theologian, and administrator. She served as the Chairperson of the Department of Philosophy and Religious Studies at the University of Nairobi for six years. In addition to her university duties, she served on numerous theological and educational boards: as a member of the Board of Governors of Limuru (now Jumuia) Conference Centre; a member of the Board of Governors, St. Andrew's School, Turi; a member of the Board of Governors of St. Pauls Theological College Limuru (now St Paul's University); a member of the Board of Directors of the Christian Organizations Research Advisory Trust (CORAT,) and she was chairman, of the Joint Urban Community Improvement Program/Scholarship Committee, a department of the National Christian Council of Kenya. She was also a member of the editorial board and a consultant editor of Wajibu.

Kìnoti was a member of several professional organizations, such as the Eastern Africa Ecumenical Symposium, the Ecumenical Association of Third World Theologians Kenyan Chapter, the Circle of Concerned African Women Theologians, the Association of Theological Institutions in Eastern Africa, and the World Conference of Associations of Theological Institutions.

== African Communitarian feminist ethics ==
Primarily, Kìnoti sought to construct an African feminist ethic of liberation that extolled indigenous knowledge systems and unique African ways of being. Her work was influenced by the advancement of Liberation Theology and nurtured by her quest to see the full liberation and empowerment of African women and all humanity. Kinoti conceptualized an African communitarian feminist ethics that deconstructed women's oppression and reclaimed women's agency, charting a course for the full realization of their rights, empowerment, and liberation. This scholarly focus was informed by her own experience as both Gikuyu and Christian and the challenges faced by many Africans integrating Christianity with their traditional values. She criticized Western missionaries for imposing their moral and ethical codes, which often overshadowed and marginalized African values. Kìnoti argued that colonization disrupted African systems and promoted neocolonialism, which undermined African norms and portrayed these norms negatively. She reclaimed and reconstructed African ethics by merging Christianity with African cultural values. She used indigenous knowledge such as language, proverbs, and folklore to develop a moral framework that honored her Gikuyu and African identity. With this ethical framework, she found a home in the Circle of Concerned African Women Theologians and African Feminism.

Kìnoti's theorization has three significant themes that are essential in understanding African communal structures and critical towards the full liberation of women and humanity. First, she conceived of human values and living a virtuous life as key indicators of the well-being of an individual and African Indigenous community. Second is the fundamental role of indispensable relationships in the structuring and survival of a community's moral order, which shapes individual actions and defines the community's character. Lastly, the centrality of the immaterial world and the recognition, veneration, and reverence of the spiritual realm and ancestral beings are critical to understanding communal life and shaping the moral fabric of African communities. With this, Kìnoti critiqued Western colonial and imperial epistemologies of gender and the interaction between men and women. Her methodology advanced the decolonization and indigenization of morals and suggested the possibility of generating a localized liberative epistemology that ensures the full flourishing of African women and their communities. Kinoti's African communitarian feminist ethics centered on African women's identities.

== Personal life ==
Hannah Wangeci married George Kìnoti and took his last name. They had five children.

== Death ==
Kìnoti died on April 30, 2001, at the age of fifty-nine years.

== Selected works ==
- Kìnoti, H.W. (2013). Growing Old in Africa: New Challenges for the Church. In Waruta, D. W. and Kinoti, H.W. (Eds). Pastoral care in African Christianity: Challenging essays in pastoral theology. Acton Publications, Nairobi, 191–218.
- Kìnoti, H. W. (2010). African ethics: Gĩkũyũ traditional morality. CUEA Press, Nairobi.
- Kìnoti, H.W. (2003). Christology in the East African Revival movement. In Mugambi, J. K., & Magesa, L. (Eds). Jesus in African Christianity: experimentation and diversity in African Christology. Acton, Publishers, Nairobi, 60–79.
- Kìnoti, H. W. (2002). Caring in the Family and Community. Crises of life in African religion and Christianity, Lutheran World Federation.
- Kìnoti, H. W. (1999). "African morality: Past and present." In Moral and Ethical Issues in African Christianity: Exploratory Essays in Moral Theology, 2nd ed., edited by J. N. K. Mugambi and Anne Nasimiyu-Wasike, 73–82. Nairobi: Acton Publishers.
- Kìnoti, H. W. (1999). "Matthew 5:1-12 An African Perspective." In Priscilla Pope-Levison and John R. Levison (eds) Return to Babel: Global Perspectives on the Bible, 125–131. Louisville, KY: Westminster John Knox Press.
- Kìnoti, H.W. (1998). Proverbs in African Spirituality. In Getui, M. N. (Ed). Theological method and aspects of worship in African Christianity. Acton Publishers, Nairobi, 55–78.
- Kìnoti, H.W. (1997). Well-being in African Society and the Bible. In Waliggo, J. M., & Kinoti, H. W. (Eds). The Bible in African Christianity: Essays in Biblical Theology. Acton Publishers, Nairobi, 112–143.
- Kìnoti, H.W. (1997). The Church in the Reconstruction of our Moral Self. In Mugambi, J. N. K. (Ed). The church and reconstruction of Africa: Theological considerations. All Africa Conference of Churches, 115–128.
- Kìnoti, H.W. (1996). Nguiko: A Tempering of Sexual Assault Against Women. In Wamue, G. & Getui, M. Violence Against Women: Reflections by Kenyan Women Theologians. Acton Publishers, Nairobi,
- Kìnoti, H.W. (1994). Pastoral Care in African Christianity: Challenging Essays in Pastoral Theology; Action Publishers
- Kìnoti, H. W. (1993). The Challenge of the New Age Movement and Oriental Mysticism. Mission in African Christianity, Uzima-Press.
- Kìnoti, H.W. (1992). African Morality: Past and Present. in J. N. Mugambi, & N. Wasike, Moral and Ethical issues in African Christianity. Nairobi: Initiatives, 73–82.
- Kìnoti, H. W. (1988). "Some principles of man-woman relationships in traditional Gĩkũyũ society." Wajibu 2(3): 2–4.
