= Peggy Mulambya-Kabonde =

Zambian feminist theologian

- Born: May 5, 1961 (age 64); Chingola, Rhodesia and Nyasaland, United Kingdom
- Education: University of KwaZulu-Natal (PhD)
- Occupation(s): Theologian, General Secretary United Church in Zambia
- Employer: United Church of Zambia Theological University.
- Spouse: Fred Kabonde (died 2020)

Peggy Mulambya-Kabonde (born 5 May 1961) is a Zambian feminist theologian and the first female General Secretary of the United Church of Zambia.

== Early life and education ==
Peggy Mulambya-Kabonde was born on May 5, 1961, in Chingola, a town in Zambia's Copperbelt Province. She is the fifth of nine children whose father worked in the mining industry and whose parents were active in the local Christian church.

She began her education at Kapopo Primary School and later attended Twatasha Primary School, joining the Girls Brigade while in grade 4. After passing her grade 7 examinations, she attended Chikola Secondary School before moving to Mporokoso Secondary School, where she completed her form five examinations in 1981.

Kabonde has a PhD in Gender and Theology from the University of KwaZulu-Natal in South Africa.

== Career ==
Kabonde is a pastoral minister with the Methodist and United Reformed Churches in the United Kingdom and an ordained minister in the United Church in Zambia. She was married to Fred Kabonde until his death in 2020.

She is the Southern Africa Coordinator of the Circle of Concerned African Women Theologians, an organization she joined in 1989. She was a professor at the United Church of Zambia Theological University. She also served as the chaplain at the University of Zambia interdenominational church and the Ecumenical and Engagement officer on campus. As of early 2018, she was the first female General Secretary of the United Church in Zambia.

Kabonde's research interests include gender justice, gender and leadership in the church, theology about gender and ecology, and "the inclusivity of all God’s creation". Her theology surrounding the "transforming gender equalities in the era of HIV/AIDS" has been called "most articulate". According to the United Church of Canada, "Kabonde has a long and abiding interest in gender justice issues in church and society and has been involved with many organizations working with these, and other social justice issues in Africa and globally".

== Works cited ==
- Fiedler, Rachel NyaGondwe (2017). A History of the Circle of Concerned African Women Theologians 1989-2007. Mzuni Press. ISBN 99960-45-22-6.
