= Anne Nasimiyu Wasike =

Ugandan Catholic theologian, religious sister, and author

Reverend Sister Professor Anne Nasimiyu Wasike LSOSF
- Born: 11 June 1949
- Died: 22 February 2018 (aged 68)
- Education: Duquesne University, Pittsburgh, Pennsylvania, USA, 1986. Gannon University, Erie, Pennsylvania, USA 1982. Magdalen College, Bedford, New Hampshire, USA, 1981, 1983 Gannon University, Pontifical Centre, Erie, Pennsylvania, USA, 1982. Mount St. Mary’s Secondary School, Namagunga, Lugazi, Uganda, 1973. Loreto Convent Msongari, Nairobi, Kenya, 1976
- Occupations: University Professor, Theologian and Catholic Religious Sister

Anne Nasimiyu Wasike (11 June 1949 – 22 February 2018) was a Ugandan Catholic theologian, religious sister, and author.

== Early life and education ==
She was the daughter of Matayo Wasike and Annastasia Nanyama. She was a sister to Priscah, Isaac, Sabina, Priscilla, John, Immanuel, Chachi and Patrick.

Anne's High school education started at St. Mary’s Secondary School, Namagunga, Lugazi, Uganda in 1973. She obtained an East African Certificate of Education (EACE.) Anne later joined Loreto Convent Msongari, Nairobi, Kenya in 1976. At Loreto, she earned an East African Advance Certificate of Education (EAACE).

Wasike was a trained teacher who received her Bachelor of Arts in Liberal Arts in Philosophy and Theology in 1981 from Magdalen College of the Liberal Arts, Bedford, New Hampshire USA, a Master of Arts degree in Religious Education at Gannon University, Pennsylvania, USA and her PhD in Systematic Theology from Duquesne University, USA. She was the first African woman theologian to earn a PhD in theology from Duquesne University.

== Career ==
Anne was a Ugandan Catholic theologian, religious sister, and author of books and articles on education, ethics and the empowerment of the poor. She was also editor of several publications. She taught in the following areas; Systematic Theology, Theology of the Church, Liberation Theology, Inculturation of the Sacraments, African Womanist Theology, African Religion, and Belief Systems in Kenya.

Christian Response to Contemporary Issues. She was a member of a Franciscan African Order of nuns called "The Little Sisters of St Francis."

Wasike addressed the United Nations General Assembly Special Session in 2001 on the plight of women and the girl-child in Africa in the age of HIV/AIDS. She was a founding member of the Ecumenical Association of Third World Theologians.

Wasike was also a founding member of the Circle of Concerned African Women Theologians, a Pan African organization of African Women founded under the leadership of Mercy Amber Oduyoye in 1989. The circle is known for being a prophetic voice as they name and shame sexism in church and society and they struggle particularly to end gender-based violence and exploitation of women. She is said to have called the world to recognize and apply Afro-Christian theo ethics as a viable way of seeking a livable and humane world.

Wasike served as the Superior General of the Little Sisters of Saint Francis with their headquarters in Nkokonjeru, Uganda on two terms each of six years: 1992 to 1998 and 2010 to 2016 She served at Kenyatta University, Kenya for 24 years in the 1980s and 1990s in the Department of Philosophy and Religious Studies. She rose from lecturer to full professor. She was appointed the director of student affairs and was able to teach and mentor many students. She was an organizer and administrator who ensured others were empowered by equipping them.

== Publications ==
Wasike authored a journal called Seeds of Mutuality in Mission: Response to Anne Nasimiyu-Wasike which was first published on 1 January 2001 as a research article. The journal lays out several challenges for people from the West. These include the need to have a greater sensitivity and knowledge of the richness and complexity of the African culture.

Wasike was a scholar and teacher of African Theology and African Religions and Cultures. She was an active participant in the Sagana group that met annually to discuss emerging issues in African Christian Theology and practice. The consultation outcomes were edited and published by Jesse N Mugambi, the convener of the Sagana group, under the African (theology) Challenge series. She taught courses, published and facilitated research meant to deepen awareness of and respect for African spiritualities. She was a champion of what is known in Catholic circles as "inculturation theology". In 1992, she coedited Moral and Ethical Issues in African Christianity Exploratory Essays in Moral Theology, with J. N Mugambi which became one of the several volumes in the African Challenge series.

== Death and legacy ==
Wasike died after a short illness, thought to be malaria. She was buried at her late mother's house in Nkokonjeru, located in the central part of Uganda on 3 March 2018. A tribute appeared in the Daily Nation on 26 February 2018. She was credited by Irimina Nungari, who was her predecessor as superior general. Cecilia Njeri, head of the Little Sisters of Saint Francis, also lauded her for championing the organization of the archives of their congregation as well as drawing solid development plans.

== Bibliography ==
- Mugambi, J N Kanyua; Nasimiyu, Anne J; Magesa, Laurenti; Nthamburi, Zablon John (1999). Democracy and reconciliation: a challenge for African Christianity. African Christianity (2nd ed.). Nairobi, Kenya: Acton. ISBN 9789966888259. OCLC 785148003.
- Mugambi, J N Kanyua; Wasike, A Nasimiyu (1992). Moral and ethical issues in African Christianity: exploratory essays in moral theology. African Christianity series, no. 3. Nairobi, Kenya: Initiatives Publishers. ISBN 9966420347. OCLC 29769088.
- Nasimiyu, Anne J; Waruta, D W (1993). Mission in African Christianity: critical essays in missiology. African Christianity. Nairobi: Uzima Press. ISBN 9966855238. OCLC 30664144.
- Nasimiyu, Anne J. Oduyoye, Mercy Amba; Kanyoro, Musimbi R.A. (eds.). "Polygamy: a feminist critique". Will to Arise: Women, Tradition and the Church in Africa: 101–118. OCLC 40341819.

Thesis

- Nasimiyu, Anne J (1986). Vatican II: the problem of inculturation (thesis). Duquesne University. OCLC 15611652.

== See also ==
- Mount St Mary's College Namagunga, Lugazi, Uganda
- Just Love: A Framework for Christian Sexual Ethics
- Margaret A. Farley
