= Nyambura Njoroge =

Nyambura J. Njoroge
- Born: 4 December 1956 (age 69)
- Occupations: Feminist theologian, Ecumenical leader

Academic background
- Education: St Paul's University Limuru, Kiambu, Kenya; Princeton Theological Seminary (1992), Princeton in New Jersey, US
- Alma mater: Princeton Theological Seminary (1992); Louisville Presbyterian School, Kentucky, US

Academic work
- Discipline: Christian theology
- Sub-discipline: Feminist theology, African Christian Ethics, Gender injustice
- Institutions: World Council of Churches
- Notable works: African Theology and Christian Social Ethics

Nyambura J. Njoroge (born 4 December 1956) is a Kenyan feminist theologian and ecumenical leader. She was the first Kenyan woman ordained in the Presbyterian Church of East Africa in 1982. She was the first African to work in the World Alliance of Reformed Churches from 1992 to 1998 when she joined the World Council of Churches. She is a founding member of the Circle of Concerned African Women Theologians and a member of the Kenyan Chapter. She is a member of ANERELA+ (the African Network of Religious Leaders Living with or Personally Affected by HIV and AIDS). She co-edited Talitha Cum! Theologies of African Women, with Musa Dube. In 1992, she became the first African woman to earn a PhD from Princeton Theological Seminary. She was the first African woman to pursue a Bachelor of Divinity degree at St. Paul's University, Limuru, Kenya.

== Early life ==
Nyambura was born on 4 December 1956 to Mary Mūthoni wa Warūgūrū na Gacomba, and Rev. Daniel Gìthanji wa Gìtogo. She was the last born in a family of nine daughters.

Her mother was a midwife in Ngìnda, Mūrang'a, and a leader in the Presbyterian Church of East Africa Woman's Guild as well as in the local community.

== Education ==
In 1978, Nyambura enrolled in St Paul's University, Kenya, formerly St. Paul's United Theological College. She was the first African woman to undertake a Bachelor of Divinity degree. She graduated in 1980. She was ordained as a minister of word and sacrament in the Presbyterian Church of East Africa on 5 September 1982. She was the first woman to be ordained in the denomination. She attended the Louisville Presbyterian School in Kentucky. In 1992, she became the first African woman to earn a PhD from Princeton Theological Seminary. Her dissertation was entitled "African Theology and Christian Social Ethics".

== Career ==
Nyambura was the program executive for the World Council of Churches' (WCC) program on Ecumenical HIV and AIDS Initiatives and Advocacy before she retired in January 2022. She worked with the WCC's Ecumenical HIV and AIDS Initiative and Advocacy (EHAIA) from 2002, which was launched the same year as the Ecumenical HIV and AIDS Initiative in Africa. Since 2007, she was the EHAIA coordinator for the World Council of Churches. During the interfaith pre-conference on HIV on the night of the 19th International AIDS Conference on July 21, with attendees singing and committing to do their bit to "turn the tide" against HIV and AIDS; Nyambura emphatically said the epidemic was more than a medical issue and was confronted by broken social relationships. She was the first African to work in the World Alliance of Reformed Churches from 1992 to 1998 when she joined WCC. She is a founding member of the Circle of Concerned African Women Theologians and a member of the Kenyan chapter. She is also a member of ANERELA+ (African Network of Religious Leaders Living with or Personally Affected by HIV and AIDS).

== Talitha cum philosophy ==
She co-edited Talitha Cum! Theologies of African Women, with Musa Dube. Nyambura Njoroge established the Talitha cum theology advocating for the rights of women and girls, fighting systems that hinder women's empowerment and development including patriarchy, gender injustices, demeaning theologies, policies, governance, and social structures. She is a feminist activist upholding the course of women's lives, values, and dignity by challenging cultural and social norms, values, and systems that oppress women and hinder them from accessing similar opportunities as men in society.

As a member of the International Network of Religious Leaders Living with and Personally Affected by HIV & AIDS (INERELA +), she is an activist against discrimination, stigmatization, marginalization, and social injustices toward people affected by HIV/AIDS, encouraging compassion, love and care for victims. She continues to emphasize and address how crises, diseases, and pandemics like HIV/AIDS and COVID-19 deeply affect women in societies.

She pioneered African Christian feminist ethics towards liberation and transformation from oppressive and demeaning theologies that fuel the cause of patriarchy in churches and theological institutions. She fought for transformation of theological and religious institutions as tools to liberate women from inequalities, violence, and injustices rather than being the force that increases gender injustices and inequalities. She worked with EHAIA bringing together churches, stakeholders and policy-makers to provide ecumenical responses and provide solutions to endemic root causes of pandemics like HIV/AIDS, and to give hope, compassion, and support to victims, marginalized groups, and those affected by the HIV/AIDS pandemic towards transformation of the society.

== Awards ==
- Mercy Amba Oduyoye Global Leadership Award, 2019
- The Circle Community Champion Award, 2019

== Selected works ==
- Njoroge, N. J. (1992). The Woman's Guild: The Institutional Locus for an African Women's Christian Social Ethic. Princeton Theological Seminary, New York.
- Njoroge, N. J. (1996). Revising Theological Education and Ministerial Formation. Ministerial Formation, 75, 6-10.
- Njoroge, N. J. (1996). Groaning and Languishing in Labour pains. Groaning in Faith: African Women in the Household of God, 3-15.
- Njoroge, N. J. (1997). The Missing Voice: African women Doing Theology. Journal of Theology for Southern Africa, (99), 77-83.
- Njoroge, N. (1997). Women, Why are you Weeping?. The Ecumenical Review, 49(4), 427- 438.
- Njoroge, N. J. (1998). A Spirituality of Resistance and Transformation. Amka, (4A), 3-13.
- Njoroge, N. J. (1999). The Promise and Ministry of the Holy Spirit: Empowering Africans to Search for the Fullness of Life. Ministerial Formation, 87(October), 48-56.
- Njoroge, N. J. (2000). Kiama kia ngo-an African Christian Feminist Ethic of Resistance and Transformation. Legon Theological Studies Series Project.
- Njoroge, N. (2001). Come Now, Let us Reason Together. Missionalia: Southern African Journal of Mission Studies, 29(2), 232-257.
- Njoroge, N. J. (2001). Transforming Ministerial Ecumenical Formation. The Ecumenical Review, 53(3), 306 - 318.
- Njoroge, N. (2001). Not an Option: Ministry with and for People with Disabilities. Ministerial Formafion, 92, 7-9.
- Njoroge, N. J. (2001). Talitha Cum! to the New Millennium: A Conclusion. Talitha cum, 245-259.
- Njoroge, N. J. (2002). Reclaiming our Heritage of Power: Discovering our Theological Voices. Her-stories: Hidden histories of women of faith in Africa, 39-57.
- Njoroge, N. J. (2003). Searching for Ways of Promoting Christian Unity in Theological Education and Ministerial Formation. Ministerial Formation, 101, 31-41.
- Njoroge, N. J. (2005). A New Way of Facilitating Leadership: Lessons from African Women Theologians. Missiology, 33(1), 29-46.
- Njoroge, N. J. (2005). An Ecumenical Commitment: Transforming Theological Education in Mission. International Review of Mission, 94(373), 248-263.
- Njoroge, N. J. (2008). Ecumenical Theological Education and the Church in Africa Today. Ministerial Formation 71: 20-25.
- Njoroge, N. J. (2012). A body of knowledge for HIV research. Journal of feminist studies in religion, 28(2), 129-133.
- Njoroge, N. J. (2013). Daughters of Africa Heed the Call for Justice, Peace, and Fullness of Life. International Review of Mission, 102(1), 30-43.
- Njoroge, N. J. (2017). Beyond Suffering and Lament: Theology of Hope and Life. In Shaping a Global Theological Mind (pp. 113-120). Routledge.
- Njoroge, N. J. (2023). Dignity, life-affirming advocacy and compassionate solidarity. Journal of International Women's Studies, 25(1), 1-11.
- Njoroge, N. J. (2023). In Remembrance of HER. Ssali Publishing House, South Africa.
