= Josephine Gitome =

Kenyan academic researcher

Dr. Josephine W. Gìtome
- Born: Josephine Wanjirū Gìtome
- Citizenship: Kenyan
- Occupations: Lecturer. Academic researcher. Advocate for Refugee Education and Empowerment

Academic background
- Education: Kenyatta University, University of Nairobi

Academic work
- Discipline: Refugee Education, Religion, Gender studies, Pastoral care, Faith and healthcare for Refugees, Youth Counseling and development, Maternal Healthcare, and Digital health solutions.
- Institutions: Kenyatta University

Josephine Wanjirū Gìtome is a Kenyan academic researcher and advocate for refugee education and empowerment. She was Director at the Centre for Refugee Studies and Empowerment from July 2012 to 2018, as well as director of the Regional Centre for Capacity Development at Kenyatta University (KU). Gìtome's scholarship and research projects focus on Education for refugees and internally displaced persons (IDPs), holistic youth development and counseling, informal maternal health, digital health solutions, and the integration of traditional indigenous methods in pastoral care.

== Education ==
Gìtome earned her PhD in Religious Studies from Kenyatta University in 2003. She has a Master of Arts Degree in Religious Studies from the University of Nairobi (1989). She completed her Bachelor of Arts in Sociology and Religious Studies at the same university in 1986. In addition to her academic qualifications, she has obtained several professional certificates, including an Advanced Certificate in Higher Education in Emergencies from the University of Geneva; a Certificate in Training of Trainers on Integrating HIV/AIDS as a Social Issue into Tertiary-Level Curricula from the University of South Africa; and a Certificate in Advanced Leadership Seminar from the Haggai Institute in Maui.

== Career ==
Gìtome is a Senior Lecturer in the Department of Philosophy and Religious Studies at Kenyatta University, with a specialization in Church History and World Religions. In 1989, Gìtome worked as a Juvenile Probation Officer with Kenya's Ministry of Home Affairs. She served as the Organizing Secretary for Puberty to Adulthood Camps Kenya (2004–2014), a program that empowers youths through mentorship and life skills during their transition into adulthood. She also served as the acting director of the Centre for Capacity Development in Higher Education (2009) and Director of the Regional Center for Capacity Development (2011). Gitome coordinated the founding and establishment of the Centre for Refugee Studies & Empowerment at Kenyatta University (KU), where she oversaw the KU and Moi University Dadaab campuses (2012–2018). In the same period, she was Kenyatta University's institutional coordinator for the Borderless Higher Education for Refugees (BHER) project in partnership with York University, the United Nations High Commission for Refugees, Windle Trust Kenya, Danish Refugee Council, and the University of Geneva to expand educational access for refugees, nationals and United Nations staff working in the refugee camps. She served as Director at the International Centre for Capacity Development (ICCD). She is a member of the Circle of Concerned African Women Theologians.

== Research and scholarship ==
Gìtome has participated in research on the Feasibility Study on the Provision of Higher Education for Refugees in Dadaab Camps in Kenya (2011–2012), which highlighted the need for better training of teacher-counselors, research-based behavioral interventions, and a holistic approach to adolescent development. She has also conducted research centred on the lives and challenges of minority groups like refugees, internally displaced persons, asylum seekers, HIV-infected persons, and women in diverse socio-political and religious settings, particularly in the Kenyan context. Her work focuses on the socio-cultural and scientific implications for refugee women's reproductive health and rights, and she studies the role of African Indigenous methods in Preventive Counseling and Holistic Development of Youths in the church to overcome challenges of identity crisis and gendered roles, which are critical in transition to adulthood, especially in urban and informal settlement areas.

On reproductive health, views the cultural practice of female genital mutilation as a sensitive religio-cultural issue that affects the reproductive health of women and influences their choice of maternal health services. Gìtome participated in a collaborative project exploring digital health solutions to reduce maternal and neonatal mortality in refugee settings. She was featured in the UN's SDG Global Festival of Action conference in 2021 for her "Birthing across Genders" project, which provided refugee midwives with certified VR training to enhance digital literacy, promote lifelong learning and improve maternal healthcare.

== Selected works ==
- Gìtome, J. W. (2011). Pastoral care in African context: The use of African indigenous practices in adolescents pastoral care. Germany, USA, UK: Lambert Academic Publishing.
- Gìtome, J. W. (2003). "The church's response to AIDS in Africa." In Theology of reconstruction: Exploratory essays (2nd ed). Nairobi, Kenya: Action Publishers.
- Gìtome, J. W. (2003). "Integration of African indigenous guidance practices to adolescents' pastoral care and counselling programs in selected churches of Nairobi" (Doctoral dissertation). Kenyatta University.
- Gìtome, J. W. (2002). "The conflict of single motherhood: A challenge to the church." In M. N. Getui & H. Ayanga (Eds.), Conflicts in Africa: A woman's response. Nairobi, Kenya: Circle of Concerned African Women Theologians, Kenya Chapter.
- Gìtome, J. W. (1989). "Pastoral care and counseling to educated young adults in the PCEA church with special reference to Kikuyu Parish" (Master's thesis). University of Nairobi.

=== Co-authored works ===
- Bagelman, J., & Gitome, J. W. (2020). "Birthing across borders: ‘Contracting’ reproductive geographies in dialogue." Human Geography, 10(3). https://doi.org/10.1177/2043820620965825
- Gìtome, J. W., & Tinuola, F. R. (2007). "Socio-cultural determinants of abortion among younger women in Nigeria." Chemchemi International Journal of Social Sciences and Humanities, 4(1), 1–9.
- Kahumbi, N., & Bagelman, J. (2024). "Gender differentiated attitude towards caesarean: A case of Somali refugees in Dadaab, Kakuma." ACTA Scientific Women’s Health, 6(2). https://doi.org/10.31080/ASWH.2024.06.0559
- Kahumbi, N., Gìtome, J. W., Bagelman, J., Maina, M., Kituku, J., Mwoma, T., & Ndegwa, P. (2021). "Family planning as a determining factor in preference to traditional birth attendants among Somali community in Dadaab refugee camps, Kenya." European Journal of Humanities and Social Sciences, 1(6). ISSN: 2736–5522
- Kathambi, F., Gìtome, J. W., & Bwire, J. P. (2023). "Integration of information and communication technology in church worship." International Journal of Innovative Research in Sciences, Engineering and Technology, 2(11), 1–3.
- Kathambi, F., Gìtome J. W., & Bwire, J. P. (2022). "Use of social media for evangelisation: A case of Full Gospel Churches of Kenya (FGCK), Meru, Kenya." Journal of Pastoral and Practical Theology, 1(1), 25–34. https://doi.org/10.51317/jppt.v1i1.268
- Mainah, M., Bagelman, J., Gìtome, J. W., Ndegwa, P., Mwoma, T., Kituku, J., & Kahumbi, N. (2021). "Placenta disposal rituals among Somali refugees in Dadaab camp." International Journal of Arts and Commerce, 10(6). ISSN: 1029–7106
- Muriethi, N. E., Gìtome, J. W., & Waweru, H. (2023). "Ecclesial-indigenous paradigms of nurturing and growth in African context: Engaging Aembu and the Anglican Church’s rites of passage for child socialization." Jumuga Journal of Education, Oral Studies, and Human Sciences, 6(1). https://doi.org/10.35544/jjeoshs.v5i1.55
- Musili, T. K., Gìtome, J. W., & Ruth, M. J. (2019). "An ethical claim for administration of pre-exposure prophylaxis (PrEP) in HIV and AIDS burdened Africa." International Journal of Arts and Humanities, 8(3).
- Rotich, C., Gecaga, M., & Gìtome, J. W. (2024). "Role of church affiliation and the sexual behaviour choices of students in selected universities in Nairobi County, Kenya." International Journal of Humanity and Social Sciences, 2(1), 1–16. ISSN: 3005–5407
- Rotich, M. C., Gecaga, M., & Gìtome, J. W. (2023). "Effects of ACK and KAG teachings in sexual behaviour choices of students in selected universities in Nairobi County, Kenya." International Journal of Humanity and Social Sciences, 1(2), 1–19. https://doi.org/10.47941/ijhss.1524
- Wang’eri, T., Tumuti, S., Mugambi, K. D., Mutweleli, S. M., Gìtome, J. W., & Njogu, M. (2014). "Extent to which African men are able to meet physiological, safety, belongingness, esteem and self-actualization needs for themselves and family in Dadaab refugee camp, Garissa County, Kenya." Global Journal of Human Sciences, 14(11), 41–55.
