= Christina Landman =

South African feminist theologian

Christina Landman Professor
- Born: 8-2-1956; Pretoria
- Citizenship: South African
- Occupation: Theologian

Academic background
- Education: PhD at University of South Africa (UNISA)
- Alma mater: University of South Africa (UNISA)

Academic work
- Discipline: Theology
- Sub-discipline: Feminist and womanist theology
- Institutions: University of South Africa(UNISA)

Christina Landman (born 1956) is a South African feminist theologian. She was the first South African woman to become a professor of theology in the University of South Africa (UNISA) in 1991. She is a recipient of the CEO Awards for South Africa's most influential woman in Training and Education. She is the Research Director of the Research Institute for Theology and Religion, University of South Africa. She is a C-rated researcher (National Research Foundation) and Editor of Studia Historiae Ecclesiasticae (accredited), subject journal of the Church History Society of Southern Africa.

== Early life and education ==
Landman was born on 08 February 1956 in Lyttelton, Pretoria. Her parents were influential members of the Afrikaner community and active in the white Dutch Reformed Church (DRC), a denomination that was closely aligned with the apartheid regime. She attended all-white schools, beginning with Fleur Laerskool and later Lyttelton Hoërskool, both Afrikaans-medium institutions.

Landman matriculated from Lyttelton Hoërskool in 1973, earning the title of Victrix Ludorum (A Latin term which connotes achievement, distinction and excellence in competition). Her father encouraged her to study theology at university because as a professor, his children were entitled to free tuition. Landman graduated with a Bachelor of Arts (BA) degree with distinctions in Greek, Hebrew and Latin. However, when she attempted to enroll at the Theological Faculty of the University of Pretoria, she was denied entry solely because she was a woman.

After being barred from studying theology in 1977, Landman enrolled for a postgraduate Baccalaureus Divinitatis (BD) degree at UNISA and graduated in 1980. She earned a Master of Arts (MA) in Greek in 1981, focusing on The use of non-Christian literary sources in the Church History of Eusebius of Caesarea. In 1987, she was awarded a Doctor of Theology (DTh) in Church History for her study on The use of Scripture in the Tractatus de regia potestate et sacerdotali dignitate of Hugo Floriacensis. She later completed a BA Honours in Latin in 1988 and a Postgraduate Diploma in Translation in 1990. In 2007, she obtained a second Doctor of Theology (DTh) in Pastoral Therapy, with a dissertation titled Doing narrative counselling in the context of township spiritualities. Landman was ordained in 18 May 2008, as a gospel minister in the Uniting Reformed Church of Southern Africa (URCSA) in Dullstroom, after obtaining her licensure in 2006.

== Career and leadership ==
Landman began her academic career in the Department of Church History at the University of South Africa as a junior lecturer in 1980 and was promoted to lecturer in 1981, senior lecturer in 1984, and associate professor in 1991. In 1990, she achieved the milestone of becoming the first female Professor of Theology at the University of South Africa. In 1996 she joined the Research Institute for Theology and Religion as Chief Researcher in a post created by the Council of the University of South Africa for Gender Studies and Religion History. In 2002 she was promoted to Research Director of the Institute.

From 2001 to 2007, she worked as a voluntary counsellor at Kalafong Hospital in Atteridgeville, attending to more than 1,000 patients as part of her second doctorate, which she obtained in 2009, titled ‘Doing narrative counselling in the context of township spiritualities’. The doctorate explores healing in a range of spiritualities, including healing through counselling, church healing and African traditional healing, so that people can explore what feels right for them.

Landman leadership roles include serving as Actuarius for the Northern Regional Synod in 2010 for two terms and for the Uniting Reformed Church in Southern Africa (URCSA) National Synod in 2019. She is a member of the Seminary Management Committee (Northern Theological Seminary) of the URCSA and was elected as actuarius (church polity expert) of the Northern Synod of the URCSA in September 2010.

Additionally, Landman served on numerous boards and committees, including the Advisory Committee, National Orders of the President of the Republic of South Africa, and the Church History Society of Southern Africa, a society for professional church historians in South Africa. She is also a member of the Society for Practical Theology in Southern Africa, a member of the Southern African Missiological Society, an executive committee member of the Oral History Association of Southern Africa (OH ASA) and an executive committee member of the International Oral History Association, editor of the Oral History Journal of South Africa and of the OHASA Conference Proceedings and editor of Studia Historiae Ecclesiasticae (accredited), subject journal of the Church History Society of Southern Africa.

== Circle of Concerned African Women Theologians ==
Landman’s connection with the Circle began in 1991 when she met Oduyoye in Geneva during a meeting. Oduyoye, who was working to establish the Circle’s presence in South Africa, identified Landman as a potential collaborator. Landman was tasked with working alongside Brigalia Bam, then General Secretary of the South African Council of Churches, to organise a gathering in Johannesburg. Despite concerns over the racial imbalance, Oduyoye invited Landman to participate in Circle meetings from their inception in the early 1990s.

Landman’s involvement with the Circle deepened her engagement with African women’s theology, shifting her theological perspective to better understand the intersection of gender, culture and religion in African contexts. Initially, the Circle was an exclusive space for black women, with white women such as Landman only being included under exceptional circumstances, reflecting the racial dynamics of the time. Despite this, Landman’s inclusion enabled her to gain insight into the struggles faced by black women theologians and to contribute to the broader theological community’s efforts to address issues of gender, race and power. As she became more involved in these discussions, Landman’s work began to bridge racial divides within the theological community, while also pushing gender issues to the forefront. Landman’s journey within the Circle reflects her pioneering role in addressing the intersections of gender, race and power in theological academia.

== Breaking gender barriers in theological academia ==
As a white Afrikaans woman, Landman occupied a dual position oppressed by patriarchal norms while benefiting from the racial privileges of apartheid. This duality informed her critiques of racial and gender inequalities within Afrikaner Calvinism. Her work, particularly The Piety of Afrikaans Women (1994), reveals how theological doctrines reinforced racial and gender hierarchies, intertwining religious teachings with Afrikaner nationalism and apartheid ideologies. She argued that this theology positioned white women as subordinate to white men in the ‘order of creation’. Landman’s exclusion from spaces of religious authority exemplifies the institutionalised patriarchy in South African theology. Her defiance extended beyond personal struggles, as she actively opposed apartheid and the patriarchal structures that silenced women in both religious and societal contexts.Through her writings and public engagements, she challenged the theological justifications for apartheid and the gendered hierarchies within the Afrikaner church.

In her own theological context, Landman found that gender issues were often sidelined in favour of topics such as science and religion. She challenge this marginalisation by using various media platforms, including the Beeld newspaper and radio programmes, to popularise feminist theology, particularly within Afrikaans society, which was resistant to feminist perspectives. Additionally, she critiqued Afrikaner Calvinism’s role in perpetuating oppression. She examined how its doctrines legitimised both racial segregation and the subordination of women, embedding these ideologies into the fabric of Afrikaner society. By challenging these theological foundations, Landman sought to dismantle the religious and social structures underpinning racial and gender-based injustices in South Africa.

Landman’s position also reflected the nuanced interplay of complicity and victimhood.White women in apartheid South Africa, although oppressed by patriarchy, benefited from racial privilege and often upheld apartheid structures. Landman’s critiques capture this complexity, addressing her victimhood under patriarchal norms while acknowledging the complicity of her racial group in creating, maintaining and sustaining systemic injustices.

== Awards ==
- Landman received the CEO award for South Africa's most influential woman in Training and Education in 2010.
- In 2004 she won the Christian Booksellers of South Africa “Book of the Year Award” for “Leefstyl-Bybel vir Vroue”.
- In 2007 she won “The Most Published Woman at Unisa (2005)” Award.

== Selected works ==
- Landman, C. (2025). Images of God in the South African Kairos Document (1985). HTS Teologiese Studies/Theological Studies, 81(1), 10863.
- Landman, C. (2022). Journeying with the Circle of Concerned African Women Theologians on Contextuality (1989–2021). Studia Historiae Ecclesiasticae, 48(2), 1–19.
- Landman, C. (2019). A Woman's Journey with the Uniting Reformed Church in Southern Africa: 25 Years. Studia Historiae Ecclesiasticae, 45(3), 1–15.
- Landman, C. (2012). Traumatised between culture and religion: Women's stories. HTS: Theological Studies, 68(2), 1–6.
- Landman, C. (2009). Calvinism and South African women: A short historical overview.
- Landman, C. (2008). Hi/stories of gender in/justice.
- Landman, C. (2007). Doing narrative counselling in the context of township spiritualities. University of South Africa (South Africa).
- Landman, C. (1997). Religious women and transformation. Journal of Constructive Theology, 3(2), 13–22.
- Landman, C. (1994). The piety of Afrikaans women: diaries of guilt; a project of the Institute for Theological Research. Studia originalia.
- Landman, C. (1995). Ten years of feminist theology in South Africa. Journal of Feminist Studies in Religion, 11(1), 143–148.
