= Eva Chipenda =

Eva de Carvalho Chipenda
- Born: Angola
- Occupations: Educator, Community Development Advocate
- Known for: Political and social advocacy in Angola
- Spouse: José Belo Chipenda
- Children: 2

Academic background
- Education: Quessua Mission School Angola

Academic work
- Discipline: Home Economics
- Notable works: The Visitor: An African Woman's Story of Travel and Discovery(1996)

Eva de Carvalho Chipenda (also Eva João Miguel de Carvalho) is an Angolan educator, community development advocate, and Christian leader. She focuses on women's empowerment, early childhood education, and church-based social initiatives in Angola. She founded and directed the Canata Preschool Program, an initiative that provided early childhood education and nutritional support for hundreds of children in the post-war period. She has worked at the World Council of Churches, and the All Africa Conference of Churches. She advocates for African women's leadership, empowerment, and sustainable development. Chipenda is the author of The Visitor: An African Woman's Story of Travel and Discovery (1996) published by the World Council of Churches.

== _{Early life and education} ==
Chipenda was born on June 15, 1931, in Calomboloca village near Luanda, Angola. She had 11 siblings and is among the three children survived to adulthood due to difficult social and health conditions. Her parents were Presbyterian and peasant farmers. At 3years, her mother sent Chipenda to be raised by Chipenda's elder brother Julio. At the age of 10years, Chipenda moved to urban Luanda which had intense missionary activity and civilization. She grew up in the era of Portuguese colonization featured with civilization and cultural adaptation. The colonial, social, cultural, and religious environment and associated challenges motivated her ambition for comprehensive social transformation and reform. She yearned for liberation of Angola from colonialism, and liberation of women from cultures that put them at the margins in society.

She completed high school in Angola and received a scholarship for a 3-year Diploma in Christian education at the Methodist Institute in Brazil. She was the first African student to study at the institute. During her studies, she attended to children in a slum and taught Sunday school. She returned to Angola in 1956 and was stationed at Quessua Methodist Mission station as a Christian educator and teacher. Quessua mission station was the cradle of Methodism in Angola. She worked as a primary teacher at the campus. The Bible School asked her to train and mentor the wives of Bible School students. She developed training guides and conducted trainings in cooking, primary healthcare, sewing, and childcare to them. Chipenda used start-up loans to fund the training project. She also trained wives of Bible students at Dondi Theological Seminary. She described the strict environment at the campus, where boys and girls were kept in separate schools and only permitted to mingle during Sunday church services. The training projects improved the lives of women and children. Exposure to global contexts influenced her worldview as reflected in her later writings.

Chipenda graduated with a degree in Secretarial course in New York. While there, she taught Sunday school for four years. She enrolled for training in various courses in Geneva including; French language, sewing courses, textile printing, interior design, and serigraphy.

== Contributions and ecumenism ==
Chipenda focuses on community empowerment particularly in Lobito, Angola. At the age of close to 80years, she founded and directed the Canata Preschool and Training Program in impoverished Lobito. The initiative provided early childhood education and nutritional support for hundreds of children (often street children and those left in the care of slightly older siblings) in the independence crisis and post-war period in Angola. The program enrolls children aging three to five years, nurturing them and creating a simulating environment through art, recreational activities, and pre-reading skills.

She coordinated programs that integrated Early Childhood Education, improving fundamental access for young children, and Women's Vocational Training by providing skills in dressmaking, culinary arts, and small-scale income generation to foster financial independence.

In Nairobi, Chipenda worked with Young Catholic Women Association in organizing dressmaking workshops. She established a design and dressmaking project to train women from different social and cultural backgrounds particularly those who were illiterate. Following Tom Mboya's assassination in Nairobi, 1969, Chipenda was restricted to train women from a specific ethnic community among the 42 ethnic communities in Kenya. Instead, she disagreed and resigned from Young Catholic Women Association.

In 1975, Chipenda became president of the World Council of Churches Women's Group in Geneva. In partnership with her husband, they established the Center of Theological Studies and Culture (CETECA) in Angola to train and equip Christian leaders and lay people with leadership skills, languages, civic training, culture, and interior design. It also provided refresher courses for clergy to empower them in supporting the youth, women, Sunday school, marginalized groups, and society. She was project manager at All Africa Conference of Churches in Nairobi where she advanced the use of African symbols in art and interior design.

Chipenda is among the founders of the Circle of Concerned African Women Theologians. She attended its inauguration in 1989. She advocates for African women's leadership and sustainable development on a global stage. Chipenda works with church and mission communities advocating for women's empowerment and education. Her work has contributed to faith-based development initiatives in Angola and the broader African ecumenical movement.

Chipenda is the author of the memoir The Visitor: An African Woman’s Story of Travel and Discovery published in1996 by the World Council of Churches Publications. The book combines personal narrative on "her role as a woman during the radical changes that took place during her lifetime", colonialism, the role of mission education, and experiences of an African women navigating international and cultural intersections across four continents.

== Exile ==
Like many Angolan intellectuals and activists of her time, Chipenda lived in exile for many years, which influenced her perspective on African identity. African countries were attaining independence and Portuguese administrators in Angola were strict due to soacial and political awareness and uprisings. Political unrests and revolts in Luanda were a threat and dangerous especially on those who worked with churches like Chipenda. Those who worked with Christian churches and church-based organizations were imprisoned, tortured, deported, and killed. Chipenda's life and that of her family was at risk in Angola and they had a dangerous escape fleeing to New York, where her husband was also in exile. She fled at night with her young daughter and infant son from Portugal by boat. These experiences and challenges initiated her later commitment to education, social development, and empowerment of women and children. Chipenda lived and worked in international centers including New York, Geneva, Nairobi, and Lobito where she engaged with ecumenical and International Christian organizations. Chipenda married Jose Belo Chipenda in 1957, an African ecumenist at All Africa Conference of Churches (AACC), who was considered a threat by the Portuguese colonial government. They have two children, Selma Terese and late Gilberto Jesse.
