= Philomena Njeri Mwaura =

Kenyan theologian

Philomena Njeri Mwaūra
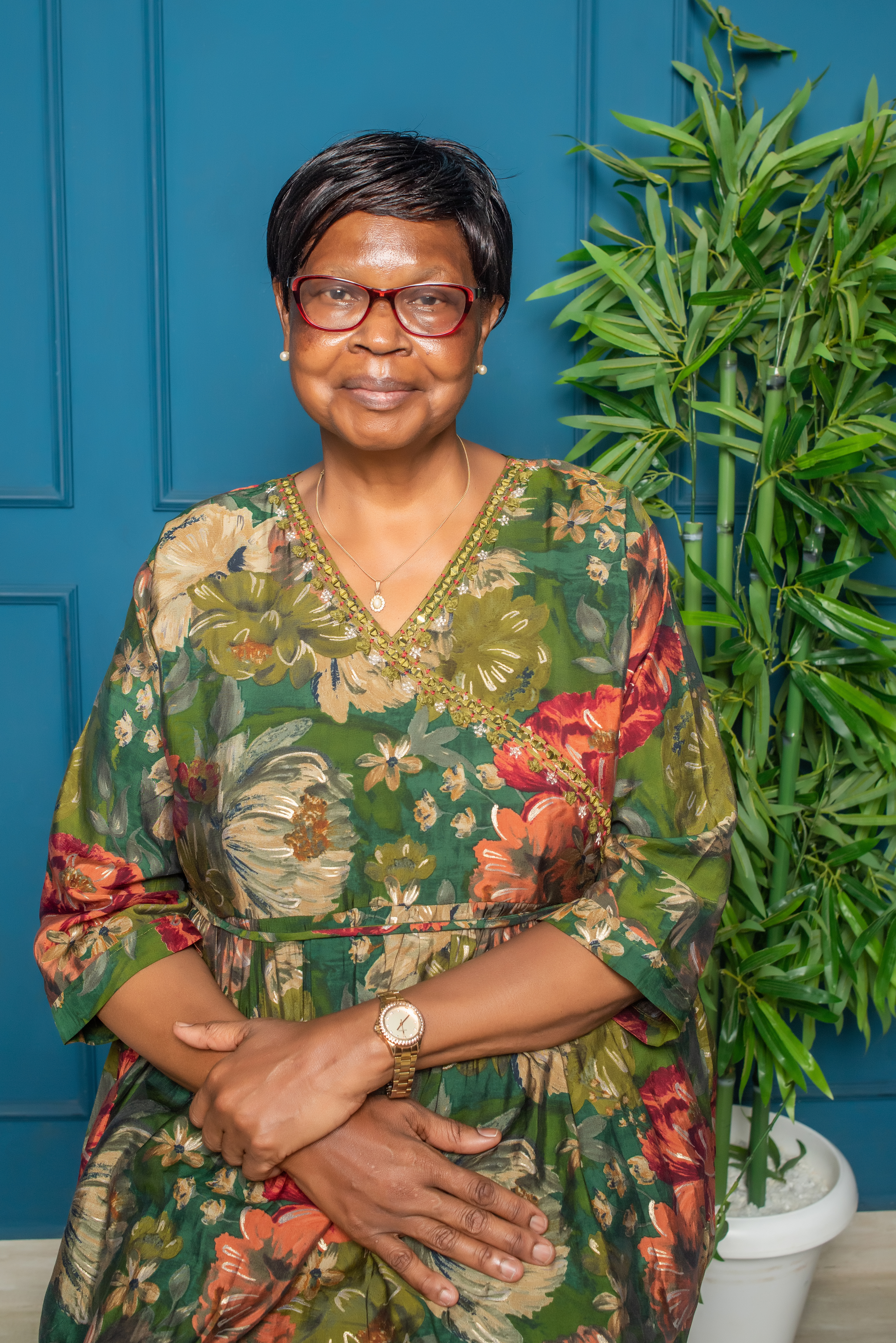
- Occupations: Feminist theologian and Professor

Academic background
- Education: Bachelor of Education (B.Ed.) Arts, Second Class Honors, Upper Division, University of Nairobi 1979,. Masters of Arts (MA) in Religious Studies, University of Nairobi, 1986. PhD Kenyatta University, 2002.
- Alma mater: University of Nairobi Kenyatta University

Academic work
- Discipline: African Christianity- History and Theology, New Religious Movements
- Sub-discipline: Christian Religious Education, Church History, Mission Studies, Gender and Theology, Pentecostal and Charismatic Christianity in Africa, African Instituted Churches, African Women’s Theology, Religion and Health.
- Institutions: Kenyatta University

Philomena Njeri Mwaūra is a Kenyan feminist theologian and an Associate Professor of Religious Studies at Kenyatta University, Kenya. She has published widely in the areas of African Christianity, theological curriculum development, religion and gender studies, New religious movements, Pentecostal and charismatic movements in Africa. She was the coordinator of the Theology Commission and Women's Commission at the Ecumenical Association of Third World Theologians. She is a member of the Circle of Concerned African Women Theologians, and is in the advisory council of the Dictionary of African Christian Biography.

== Education ==
Mwaūra studied at Loreto High School in Matunda and finished O levels in 1973. She went to Loreto High school in Limuru for A levels and completed in 1975.

Mwaūra obtained a Bachelor of Education degree in 1979 from the University of Nairobi, Kenya, and a Master of Arts in 1984 from the same university. She wrote her masters thesis on The Akurinu churches: a study of the history and some of the basic beliefs of the Holy Ghost Church of East Africa. She received her PhD from Kenyatta University in 2001 with a thesis titled A theological and cultural analysis of healing in Jerusalem church of Christ and Nabii Christian church of Kenya.

== Career ==
Mwaūra was Coordinator of the Theology Commission (Africa Region) of the Ecumenical Association of Third World Theologians (EATWOT). She was the coordinator of EATWOT's Women's Commission from 1997-2006. She was the chairperson of EATWOT, Kenya chapter from 1998-2003. She was president of the International Association for Mission Studies. She is a member of the Circle of Concerned African Women Theologians. Mwaūra was the Director of the Center for Gender Equity and Empowerment, an advocacy wing of Kenyatta University. She has taught in the Department of Philosophy and Religious Studies at the university since 1990. She currently serves as the Chair of the Collaborative Centre for Gender and Development in Kenya. She is a member of the advisory council of the Dictionary of African Christian Biography. She has taught in church-based institutions on World Christianity, the church in Africa, and New religious movements in Africa.

=== Professional associations ===
Mwaūra is a member of several professional bodies including; the International Association for Mission Studies, Ecumenical Association of Third World Theologians, Ecumenical Symposium of Eastern Africa Theologians, Dictionary of African Christian Biography, and African Association for the Study of Religion.

== Awards ==
Mwaūra has received numerous awards, fellowships, and research grants throughout her academic career. From May 2012 to August 2018, she served as a Senior Research Fellow at the Nagel Institute, Calvin College, United States of America. In 2010, she held a Senior Research Fellowship at Yale Divinity School and the Overseas Ministries Study Centre in New Haven, Connecticut. Earlier, in 2007, she was awarded the William Paton Research Fellowship at the University of Birmingham and was recognized as the 4th among the top 50 researchers at Kenyatta University. In 1996, she received a scholarship to study at the Centre for the Study of New Religious Movements at Selly Oak Colleges, University of Birmingham. Mwaūra was also recognized as the 8th best-performing Director at Kenyatta University for meeting her Performance Contract Targets. Additionally, she served as a consultant for the “Engaging Africa” project (2013–2017), organized by the Nagel Institute and funded by the John Templeton Foundation.

== Research ==
^{Mwaūra’s research focuses on African Christianity, African Instituted Churches, African feminist theologies, Pentecostalism, and emerging religious movements in Africa, as well as the intersection of African women and Christianity, missiology, religious education, and religion and violence in East Africa.} ^{She co-edited Theology in the Context of Globalization: African Women's Response and Challenges and Prospects of the Church in Africa. Mwaūra contends that the founding of churches by African women represents “the ultimate act of religious independency and self-determination.”}

== Selected publications ==
=== Chapters ===
Mwaura, P. N. (2007). Gender and power in African Christianity: African Instituted Churches and Pentecostal Churches. In O. U. Kalu (Ed.), African Christianity: An African story. Africa World Press.

Mwaura, P. N. (2012). Woman lost in the global maze: Women and religion in East Africa under globalization. In S. Briggs & M. M. Fulkerson (Eds.), The Oxford handbook of feminist theology. Oxford University Press.

Mwaura, P. N. (2018). Reconstructing mission: The church in Africa in the service of justice, peace, and reconciliation. In E. Chitando (Ed.), Religion and social reconstruction in Africa. Routledge.

Mwaura, P. N., & Parsitau, D. S. (2016). Perceptions of women's health and rights in Christian new religious movements in Kenya. In E. Chitando & A. Adogame (Eds.), African traditions in the study of religion in Africa: Emerging trends, indigenous spirituality and the interface with other world religions (pp. 175–186). Routledge. https://doi.org/10.4324/9781315566047

Parsitau, D. S., & Mwaura, P. N. (2010). Gospel without borders: Gender dynamics of transnational religious movements in Kenya and the Kenyan diaspora. In A. Adogame (Ed.), Religion crossing boundaries (pp. 185–209). Brill.

=== Journal articles ===
Mwaura, P. N. (2005). A spirituality of resistance and hope: African Instituted Churches' response to poverty. ORITA: Ibadan Journal of Religious Studies, 37(1–2), 65–83.Mwaura, P. N. (2007). Integrity of mission in the light of the gospel: Bearing witness of the spirit among Africa's gospel bearers. Mission Studies, 24(2), 189–212. https://doi.org/10.1163/157338307X234842

Mwaura, P. N. (2008a). African Instituted Churches in East Africa. Studies in World Christianity, 10(2), 160–184. https://doi.org/10.3366/swc.2004.10.2.160

Mwaura, P. N. (2008b). Stigmatization and discrimination of HIV/AIDS women in Kenya: A violation of human rights and its theological implications. Exchange, 37(1), 35–51. https://doi.org/10.1163/157254308X251322

Mwaura, P. N. (2009). Human identity and the gospel of reconciliation: Agenda for mission studies and praxis in the 21st century: An African reflection. Mission Studies, 26(1), 17–30. https://doi.org/10.1163/157338309X446755

Mwaura, P. N., & Martinon, C. M. (2010). Political violence in Kenya and local churches' responses: The case of the 2007 post-election crisis. The Review of Faith & International Affairs, 8(1), 39–46. https://doi.org/10.1080/15570271003707812

Parsitau, D. S., & Mwaura, P. N. (2010). God in the city: Pentecostalism as an urban phenomenon in Kenya. Studia Historiae Ecclesiasticae, 36(2), 95–112.
