= Lydia Mwaniki =

Reverend Lydia Muthoni Mwaniki
- Born: Kabare, Kirinyaga
- Occupation: Anglican Priest
- Spouse: Reverend Daniel S. Mwaniki (Deceased)

Academic background
- Education: Certificate in Theology, St. Paul's united Theological college Bachelor of Divinity, St. Paul's University Master of Theology in African Christianity, University of KwaZulu-Natal PhD in Theology (New Testament Studies and Gender)
- Alma mater: St. Paul's University, Limuru Kenya KwaZulu-Natal, South Africa

Academic work
- Discipline: Theology
- Sub-discipline: African Christianity New Testament Studies Gender
- Institutions: All Africa Conference of Churches (AACC)

Lydia Muthoni Mwaniki is the Director for Gender, Women and Youth Department at the All Africa Conference of Churches (AACC). She is an ordained priest in the Anglican Church of Kenya (ACK) Diocese of Nairobi, Kenya. Mwaniki was the first woman to be formally nominated as a candidate for Bishopric in the ACK Diocese of Kirinyaga in 2012. She is a gender justice champion in Kenya and across the African Union (AU). She has participated in United Nations and AU platforms on gender justice and empowerment of women and girls. Mwaniki advocates for the participation of men and youth champions in the fight against Sexual and Gender Based Violence (SGBV) and gender equality. She is a postcolonial feminist theologian known for reinterpreting gendered biblical texts in life-affirming ways that respond to gender shifting roles in Africa and contribute to the pursuit of gender justice.

== Education and career ==
Mwaniki graduated with a PhD in theology (New Testament Studies and Gender) from the University of Kwazulu-Natal, South Africa, in April 2011 with her thesis titled the Impact of the Church on the Development of the Identity of an African Christian Woman: A Case Study of the Anglican Church of Kenya, Diocese of Kirinyaga. She earned a Master of Theology (MTH) degree in African Christianity from the same university in 2001. She earned a certificate in Theology and a Bachelor of Divinity degree in 1989 and 1992 respectively, from St. Paul's United Theological College (now St. Paul's University, Limuru). Her research interests lie in applying postcolonial feminist theory to read and reinterpret gendered biblical texts, such as 1 Corinthians 11:1-16, in life-affirming ways for both women and men, within the context of shifting gender roles in Africa and the pursuit of justice.

Mwaniki has served as the Director of Theology, Family Life, and Gender Justice at the All Africa Conference of Churches since August 2015. She was the Continental editor for Africa in the Mission Theology in the Anglican Communion project, which partnered with the Archbishop of Canterbury, Durham University, and Church Mission Society to write, network, publish, and engage with theologians in the global North, to renew the worldwide Church, and to influence society. She worked as a lecturer in the faculty of theology at St. Paul's University in Kenya, where she taught New Testament and gender related courses from 2010 to 2015. She has participated in United Nations and African Union platforms on issues of gender justice and empowerment of women and girls, such as the Commission on Population and Development (CPD 51 and 52) in New York. She is a member of the steering committee developing the new AU Strategy for Gender Equality and Women's Empowerment (GEWE). She also helped organize the participation of Religious Leaders at the Nairobi Summit (ICPD25), held in Nairobi from November 12 to 14, 2019.

== Advocacy for gender justice ==
Mwaniki has pioneered interventions around Sexual and Gender Based Violence (SGBV), including sexual violence against children. She advocates for increased participation of men and youth in the fight against SGBV and gender equality. She has been instrumental in creating a program called “Male Champions for Gender Justice” at AACC, through which men in six pilot African countries speak out about preventing gender-based violence. As an ordained priest, she ably counters biblical interpretations that reinforce gender disparities in church and society by applying postcolonial feminist theory to read and reinterpret gendered biblical texts, such as 1 Corinthians 11:1-16, in life-affirming ways for both women and men, within the context of shifting gender roles in Africa and the pursuit of justice. She advocates for women's access to education, theological training, resources, and health services, including sexual and reproductive health, to build their capacity for leadership roles and development in the church and community. Mwaniki is concerned about the plight of widows in Africa, inspired by patriarchal religio-cultural ideologies.

== Ministry ==
Mwaniki believes that her call to ministry began before her birth. She recounts that when her mother was four months pregnant, she prayed that if the child were a boy, he would serve in God's house. However, when Mwaniki was born a girl, her mother abandoned the vow, holding the belief that women did not serve in the church. Mwaniki later reflected on this paradox as formative in her own journey, as she went on to embrace her call to ministry. She grew up in the Anglican Church of Kenya and experienced a call to ministry after secondary school during an overnight prayer meeting. Encouraged by her parish vicar, she joined a theological college at a time when women were not being ordained. Despite facing challenges such as gender discrimination in church leadership, she advanced in theological education. As a young church leader, Mwaniki encountered resistance including being excluded from meetings and denied allowances, reflecting broader opposition to women's ministry within the church. These experiences shaped her ministerial focus. Mwaniki was later ordained as a pastor in the Anglican Church of Kenya. She was the first woman to be formally nominated as a candidate for Bishopric in the ACK Diocese of Kirinyaga in 2012. She has since combined pastoral ministry with advocacy work, emphasizing gender justice, theological education and the empowerment of women in church and society.

== Award and recognition ==
Mwaniki received the Lanfrac Award for Education and Scholarship from the Archbishop of Canterbury, Justin Welby, in March 2016. The award is named after Lanfrac, Archbishop of Canterbury from 1070 to 1089, who was a scholar and teacher. The award was presented for her prayerful, post-colonial interpretation of the New Testament, astute advocacy of gender justice, and articulate joy in Christ, which have influenced Church leaders and the education and hope of innumerable women throughout Africa. The award is one of the highest honors in the Anglican Communion, offered to people who have made exceptional contributions to the church and society.

== Selected works ==
- Mwaniki, L. (2023). Practicing Servant Leadership. The Quest for Biblical Servant Leadership: Insights from the Global Church, 92.
- Mwaniki, L. 2021. “The Plight of Widows in Africa: Resistance in the Struggle for Justice”. In in Rage and Hope: 75 Prayers for a Better World. Ed. Chine MacDonald and Wendy Lloyd. London: SPCK (91–93). (Celebrating 75 years of Christian Aid).
- Mwaniki, L. (2021). Religion, Women's Reproductive Health, and Rights. Religion, Gender, and Wellbeing in Africa, 63.
- Mwaniki, L. (2019). Enhancing Theological Education for Women in Africa: The Role of African Women Theologians and the All Africa Conference of Churches. The Ecumenical Review, 71(4), 492–496.
- Mwaniki, L. 2019. “Women, Reconciliation and Mission in Africa: A Biblical Mandate.” In Walking together: Global Anglican Perspectives on Reconciliation. Ed. Muthuraj Swamy and Stephen Spencer. London: The Secretary General of the Anglican Communion (69–85).
- Mwaniki, L. 2018. Gender & Imago Dei: A Postcolonial African Reading of 1 Corinthians 11:1-16. Pennsylvania: Borderless Press.
- Mwaniki, L. M. (2016). Gender and Sustainable Development in Africa: Implications for the Church. Mission Theology in the Anglican Communion.
- Mwaniki, L., & Mouton, E. (2015). From patriarchy to participatory freedom?. Living with dignity. African perspectives on gender equality, 343–378.
- Mwaniki, L. (2013). Ethnicity and the December 2007 Post-Election Violence in Kenya: A Postcolonial Examination and Theological Response. Our Burning Issues: A Pan African Response. Ed. Edison M. Kalengyyo, James N. Amanze, and Isaac Deji Ayegboyin. Limuru: Zapf Chancery, 185–201.
- Mwaniki, L. M. (2011). God's Image Or Man's Glory?: A Kenyan Postcolonial Feminist Reading of 1 Corinthians 11: 1-16. Doctoral dissertation, University of KwaZulu-Natal, Pietermaritzburg.
- Mwaniki, L. M. (2010). Unveiling Paul: A postcolonial feminist examination of the construction of the Roman family and its influence on Pauline and contemporary Christians (1 Corinthians 11: 1–16). Journal of constructive theology, 16(1), 30–59.
- Mwaniki, L. M. (2001). The Impact of the Church on the Development of the Identity of an African Christian Woman: A Case Study of the Anglican Church of Kenya, Diocese of Kirinyaga, 1910-1999. Doctoral dissertation, University of Natal, Pietermaritzburg.
