= Anne Nkirote Kubai =

Kenyan scholar

- Occupation: Researcher
- Title: Associate Professor

Academic background
- Education: PhD in King College-London in 1995

Academic work
- Discipline: Religious Studies
- Institutions: Researcher Sodertorn University

Anne Nkirote Kubai is an associate professor of World Christianity and interreligious studies. She is a researcher at the School of Historical and Contemporary Studies, Södertörn University, Sweden. She researches on conflict and peace building, religion, genocide, transitional justice, sexual and gender-based violence and psychosocial studies. She is a professor extraordinarius at the Institute of Gender Studies at the University of South Africa (UNISA).

== Education ==
Kubai obtained her PhD in 1995 from King's College London. Her doctoral thesis is titled "The Muslim presence and representations of Islam among the Meru of Kenya." Kubai has a Bachelor of Education degree and a master's degree from the University of Nairobi. Her Masters dissertation focused on sectarianism and ethno-religious politics in the early 20th century.

== Career ==
Kubai is currently a researcher at the School for Historical and Contemporary Studies, Södertörn University, Sweden. She has worked in other capacities among them as the Research Director for Life & Peace Institute in Uppsala, Sweden, and as a senior social scientist at the Division of Global Health (IHCAR), at Karolinska Institute in Stockholm, Sweden.

Kubai is an affiliated research fellow in practical theology and missiology at Stellenbosch University, South Africa and a research associate at the Research Institute for Theology and Religion, University of South Africa, Pretoria. She is also a researcher at the school for Historical and Contemporary Studies in Södertörn University, Sweden. She was a lecturer (May 1995 - June 2001) in the Department of Philosophy and Religious Studies at Kenyatta University, Nairobi Kenya and senior lecturer, Kigali Institute of Education, Rwanda.

== Research ==
Kubai researches on religion, interfaith relations, peace and conflict, gender, and sexual violence and the way spiritualties/religions (indigenous and others) shape social-political developments, post-conflict social reconstruction and the sustainability discourse in different parts of the world. For instance, her work on Post-genocide Rwanda examines the role of religion in reconciliation and reconstruction of the society. Kubai has published widely on Christian -Muslim relations and peace building and reconciliation in Africa.

== Documentaries ==
Kubai has produced two documentaries: Female Warriors: Production by Anne Kubai, 2017 and Reformed Raiders: Production by Anne Kubai, 2017. She has also appeared in a number of documentaries including Ordinary Savage: The Origins of Violence and Hurt Feelings (2018). “A hard-hitting documentary about humans… and Folkmord I Rwanda: Swedish Radio.

== Selected works ==
- Kubai, A. (2023). Peacebuilding in Fragile, War-Torn Societies in Africa. In The Routledge International Handbook of Sociology and Christianity (pp. 326-338). Routledge.
- Kubai, A. (2021). The “Africa Rising” Paradox, Human Trafficking, and Perilous Migration Across the Sahara and the Mediterranean to Europe. In: Omeje, K. (eds) The Governance, Security and Development Nexus. Palgrave Macmillan, Cham.355-372
- Kubai, A. (2021) "Burying the Hatchet. Exploring Traditional Practice of Reconciliation Among Pastoralist Communities in East Africa." In Kerr, R., Redwood, H., & Gow, J. (Eds.). Reconciliation after War: Historical Perspectives on Transitional Justice (1st ed.). Routledge, 180-194
- Kubai, A. (2016). “Confession’ and ‘Forgiveness’ as a strategy for development in post-genocide Rwanda”. In HTS Teologiese Studies / Theological Studies; Vol 72, No 4 (2016), 9 pages.
- Kubai, A. and Ahlberg, B. (2013). “Making and unmaking ethnicities in the Rwandan context: implication for gender-based violence, health, and wellbeing of women.” In Ethnicity & Health. Volume 18, Issue 5, 469–482.
- Kubai, A. (2013). “Being here and there: migrant communities in Sweden and the conflicts in the Horn of Africa”. In African and Black Diaspora: An International Journal. Vol. 6, No. 2, 174–188.
