= Kathy Kiuna =

Bishop and co-founder of Jubilee Christian Church (JCC) Parklands

- Church: Jubilee Christian Church

Personal details
- Born: Catherine Wangūi Karanja; July 18, 1973 (age 53) Thìndìgua, Kiambu County
- Denomination: Christian
- Residence: Nairobi County
- Spouse: Allan Kiuna (Deceased)
- Education: Diploma in Counselling Psychology, Amani Counselling Centre

Kathy Kiuna, née Karanja (born July 18, 1973), is a Kenyan Pentecostal minister and a prosperity gospel preacher. She is a bishop and co-founder of Jubilee Christian Church (JCC) Parklands, a corporate Neo-Pentecostal church in Nairobi, Kenya. Kiuna is a gospel singer, praise and worship leader, marriage counselor and an author. She also founded the Daughters of Zion movement, which empowers girls and women, and host of a television program called "Women Without Limits" that features inspiring stories of women who have overcome the odds to achieve their goals and success. Kiuna is additionally the founder of Daughters of Zion Mentorship program, which prepares women for church ministry and community development. JCC has 21 branches worldwide including Jubilee Christian Church, Atlanta and Jubilee Christian Church, Nottingham, as well as Jubilee Christian Church, Burundi.

== Early life, education and work ==
Kathy Kiuna was born Catherine Wangūi Karanja, on July 18, 1973, in Thìndìgua Kìambu District (now Kiambu County) in Kenya. She is the third of five children, born to Sarah Wambūi and David Karanja. After high school, Kiuna enrolled at Queensway Secretarial College and earned a Diploma in Secretarial studies. She also holds a Diploma in Counselling Psychology from Amani Counselling Centre, affiliated with Tangaza University. Kiuna worked as a secretary at Top Lease and Holding before venturing into church ministry work.

== Family life and church ministry ==
She married Bishop Allan Kiuna in 1994 and they have three children. In 1999, she co-founded the Jubilee Christian Church (JCC) with her husband Allan Kiuna. JCC is a contemporary Christian organization run like a business, applying market place rhetoric and marketing principles to maximize profits. The church has 21 branches, of which 18 are in Kenya, one in Burundi, one in Nottingham and one in Atlanta. Kiuna started her church ministry work as a praise and worship leader and later became an associate pastor. In 2003, Kiuna founded the Daughters of Zion (DoZ) ministry within JCC to address women's issues in the church and society. The DoZ brought Kiuna into prominence, leading her to launch the 'Women Without Limits' television program that was aired weekly on a national broadcasting station and later on YouTube. Through the 'Women Without Limits' program, Kiuna utilizes motivational talks, spiritual and scriptural affirmations to foster empowerment through spiritual capital and religious language. The DoZ is a monthly meeting that attracts women from various social backgrounds. The ministry has grown to thousands of followers and Kiuna hosts an annual Daughters of Zion convention that brings together various Pentecostal pastors and evangelists from around the world. Under Kiuna's leadership the daughters of Zion ministry has expanded to include a cooperative society for savings and loans to help women start businesses, supporting the ministry's goal of raising the standard among women. After her husband's death in 2024, Kiuna was ordained as the bishop of JCC and now leads the 21 member ministries.

== Selected works ==
- Kiuna, A. & Kiuna, K. (2006). Appointment with Destiny. A Moving Testimony of God's Love and Faithfulness. Nairobi. Jubilee Publishers.
- Kiuna, A. & Kiuna, K. (2010). The Promise Guidebook: A Handbook for Appropriating Divine Promises In Your Life. Nairobi. Jubilee Publishers.
- Kiuna, A. & Kiuna, K. (2012). Marriage Works. Nairobi. Jubilee Publishers.
- Kiuna, K. (2016). Transformed Woman. Nairobi. Jubilee Publishers.
- Kiuna, K. (2020). LET ME GO: Breaking the shackles of insecurity. Jubilee Publishers {e-book}.
- Kiuna, K. (2023). Intimacy with God. Jubilee Publishers {e-book}.
