= Emily Jeptepkeny Choge Kerama =

Professor Emily J. Choge Kerama
- Born: 1959 (age 66–67)
- Occupations: Associate Professor and Theologian

Academic background
- Education: Ph.D. in Theology from Fuller Theological College, California.
- Alma mater: Fuller Theological College, California.

Emily Jeptepkeny Choge Kerama is a Kenyan theologian, associate professor and chair of Postgraduate Studies in Theology at Moi University, Kenya. Her areas of specialization are Christian ethics, old testament, social ethics, and intercultural theology. She has served widely in her community to vulnerable children and young people through the Uasin Gishu Children’s FORUM and the African Christian Initiation Program. She also has contributed to The Global Dictionary of Theology (2008) and Africa Bible Commentary (2006). She is a founder member of the African Christian Initiation Program (ACIP), which established one of the earliest youth mentorship and ethical formation programs targeting high-risk adolescents in Kenya.She is an active contributor of national and international theological discourse.

== Early life and education ==
Choge was born in 1959. She earned her Ph.D. in Christian Ethics from Fuller Theological Seminary. She began teaching at Moi University in 1990 in the Department of Philosophy, Religion, and Theology. She has taught courses in social ethics, Old and New Testament studies, systematic theology, and intercultural theology. She currently serves as Chair of the Postgraduate Departmental Committee, mentoring students and emerging scholars.

She is a founder member of the African Christian Initiation Program (ACIP), which established one of the earliest youth mentorship and ethical formation programs targeting high-risk adolescents in Kenya. She also serves as Chair of the Uasin Gishu Children’s FORUM, leading coordinated support for vulnerable children in Eldoret and influencing child welfare practices at the county level. As the author of An Ethic of Hospitality, she has produced a landmark work integrating biblical scholarship with practical responses to refugee crises and social justice issues in Kenya. In addition, she is an active contributor of national and international theological discourse through teaching, publications, and participation in professional associations such as the Society of Christian Ethics and the Society of Biblical Literature.

== Service, community engagement, and impact ==
Choge has combined her academic work in theology with extensive social and community leadership in Kenya. She serves as Chair of the Uasin Gishu Children’s Forum and the Advisory Board of BethanyKids, is a founding member of the African Christian Initiation Program (ACIP), and participates in the Uasin Gishu Education Board. Through these roles, she has focused on youth mentorship, advocacy for vulnerable populations, and integrating theological scholarship with practical ethical action, shaping both educational and social development in her community.

== Publications ==
Matelong, E. K., Choge, E., & Njure, S. (2022). Methods in combating alcoholism: The Roman Catholic Church’s response to the “second generation” alcohol in Eldoret Municipality, Uasin Gishu County, Kenya. Jumuga Journal of Education, Oral Studies and Human Sciences, 5(1), 1–13. https://doi.org/10.35544/jjeoshs.v5i1.44.

Matelong, E. K., Choge, E., & Njure, S. (2022). The challenge of second generation alcohol abuse in Kenya: Examining the relevant factors with reference to Roman Catholic Church believers in Eldoret Municipality, Uasin Gishu County. Jumuga Journal of Education, Oral Studies and Human Sciences, 5(1), 1–16. https://doi.org/10.35544/jjeoshs.v5i1.42.

Choge‑Kerama, E. J., Rono, M. C., & Dickerson‑Putman, J. (2021). Changing motivations for woman‑to‑woman marriages among the Nandi of Kenya. East African Journal of Traditions, Culture and Religion, 4(1), 46–60. https://doi.org/10.37284/eajtcr.4.1.462.

Wambete, M. C., Choge, E., Wamalwa, M. E., & Kinuthia, R. (2020). Enhancement of strategies of men participation in the Great Commission mandate in the Africa Inland Church in Trans‑Nzoia East Sub‑County, Kenya. IJRDO – Journal of Social Science and Humanities Research, 5(7), 47–62. https://ijrdo.org/index.php/sshr/article/view/3761.

Kamaara, E. K., Nyongesa, P., Ayanga, H. O., Choge‑Kerama, E. J., Chelagat, D., Koech, J. K., … Lemons, J. (2020). Hospital‑based spiritual care for mothers of neonates at RMBH in Eldoret, Kenya: A situational analysis. Health and Social Care Chaplaincy, 7(2), 145–167. https://doi.org/10.1558/hscc.37265.

Nyaenya, Z. A., Choge, E., & Koech, J. (2019). An integrated strategy of Christian and traditional parenting in the Gusii community, Kenya. International Journal of Social Sciences, 1.

Choge‑Kerama, E. J. (2018). The pilgrim motif in Hebrews. In Text and Context: Vernacular Approaches to the Bible in Global Christianity (pp. 130–145).

Choge, E. J. (2018). Mugambi: A prophet of hope for the uprooted people of Africa. Journal of the Interdenominational Theological Center, 34(2).

Nyaenya, Z. A., Choge, E., & Koech, J. (2017). The biblical approach of Proverbs 1–9 that is applicable and relevant to addressing increased antisocial ills in Africa. European Journal of Philosophy, Culture and Religion, 1, 48–69.

Choge, E. J. (2013). “I was a stranger and you welcomed me”: Jesus’ teaching on hospitality with special reference to Matthew 25:31–46.

Choge, E. J. (Contributor). (2006). In T. Adeyemo (Ed.), Africa Bible Commentary. Nairobi: WordAlive Publishers.

Choge, E. J. (Contributor). (2008). In S. B. Bevans & R. Schroeder (Eds.), Global Dictionary of Theology. Downers Grove, IL: InterVarsity Press.

== Selected works ==
1. “Emily Choge Kerama — Author Profile.” Insights Journal. Retrieved from https://insightsjournal.org/authors/emily-choge-kerama/
2. “Emily Choge Kerama — Langham Literature Author Bio.” Langham Literature. Retrieved from https://langhamliterature.org/author-bio?author_id=9075
3. “About Us — National Chaplaincy Training Centre.” National Chaplaincy Training Centre (Kenya). Retrieved from https://nationalchaplaincytrainingcentre.org/about-us
4. Interview with Emily Choge‑Kerama [Video]. YouTube. Retrieved from https://www.youtube.com/watch?v=T-DlPfTxp_s
