= Teresia Mbari Hinga =

Kenyan Christian feminist theologian

Teresia Mbarì Hinga
- Born: January 25, 1955; Ndumberi, Kìambu, Kenya.
- Died: March 31, 2023 (aged 68); Chicago, Illinois, US

Academic background
- Education: Kenyatta University; Nairobi University; University of Lancaster

Academic work
- Discipline: Theology
- School or tradition: Christian feminism; Roman Catholicism
- Institutions: DePaul University; Santa Clara University
- Main interests: African women's theology
- Notable works: Women, Religion and HIV/AIDS in Africa (2008); African, Christian, Feminist (2017)

Teresia Mbarì Hinga (January 25, 1955 – March 31, 2023) was a Kenyan Christian feminist theologian and an associate professor of religious studies at Santa Clara University in California. She was a founding member of the Circle of Concerned African Women Theologians.

== Early life and education ==
Hinga was born in Kenya on January 25, 1955, to Agnes Wairimu and Ernest Hinga, in the village of Ndumberi, Kiambu in British-occupied Kenya. The family were pioneer African Catholics who treated their male and female children equally, including in education. Hinga attended a Loreto high school. She received a bachelor's degree in English Literature and Religious Studies from Kenyatta University in 1977 and a master's in Religious Studies from Nairobi University in 1980. She earned her PhD from the University of Lancaster in the UK in 1990 with a thesis titled Women, Power and Liberation in an African Church: A Theological Case Study of the Legio Maria Church in Kenya on the role of women in African Christianity. Hinga was a founding member of the Circle of Concerned African Women Theologians and a member of the Kenyan Chapter of the Circle.

== Career ==
Hinga was one of the co-founders of the Circle of Concerned African Women Theologians, established in 1989 at a gathering of African women theologians in Ghana.

Hinga was on the faculty at Santa Clara University from 2005 until her death. She was an associate professor of religion at DePaul University in Chicago from 1994-2005, having previously taught at Kenyatta University in Nairobi, Kenya (1987-1994). She was a member of the Black Catholic Symposium of the American Academy of Religion, and of the Association for the Academic Study of Religion in Africa. She was on the editorial board of the Journal of Global Catholicism.

=== Research and writing ===
Hinga's research interests included Religion and Women, African Religious History, and the Ethics of Globalization. She argued that the Christ of the missionary enterprise was "ambivalent", both a conqueror legitimizing subjugation and a liberator. Women, in particular, need to reject any christology that "smacks of sexism and functions to entrench lopsided gender relations."

== Personal life ==
Hinga was a single mother to two children; Pauline and Anthony, and two grandchildren.

== Death ==
Hinga died on March 31, 2023, after a protracted battle with Cancer.

Hinga's 2017 book, African, Christian, Feminist: The Enduring Search for What Matters, is a collection of essays that examine her journey from Africa to Silicon Valley, seeking to show the concrete impact of feminist work in religion in areas including HIV/AIDS and violence against women. It includes the story of Kimpa Vita, an African Catholic woman in the 1700s who was martyred for challenging missionary Christianity and its support of colonialism and slavery.

== Selected publications ==
=== Books ===
- Hinga, Teresia Mbari (2008). Women, Religion and HIV AIDS in Africa: Responding to Ethical and Theological Challenges. Pietermaritzburg: Cluster Publishers. ISBN 9781875053698.
- Hinga, Teresia Mbari (2017). African, Christian, Feminist: The Enduring Quest for What Matters. Orbis Books. ISBN 9781608337149.

=== Chapters ===
- Hinga, Teresia (1995). "Inculturation and the otherness of Africans:Some Reflections". In P.Turksen; F Wijsen (eds.). Inculturation: Abide by the Otherness of Africa and the Africans. Eerdmans. ISBN 9780802861788.
- Elisabeth Schüssler Fiorenza; M. Shawn Copeland, eds. (1996). "Between Colonialism and Inculturation: Feminist Theologies in Africa". Feminist Theologies in Different Contexts. Concilium Journal Series. Maryknoll, New York: Orbis Books. ISBN 9780334030362.
- Rosemary Radford Ruether, ed. (1996). "Gikuyu Theology of Land and Environmental Justice". Women Healing the Earth: Third World Women on Feminism, Ecology and Religion. Maryknoll, New York: Orbis Books. pp. 172–83. ISBN 9781570750571.
- Hinga, Teresia Mbari (2005). "African Notions of Afterlife". Macmillan Encyclopedia of Religion.
- Hinga, Teresia M. (2016). "Jesus Christ and the Liberation of Women in Africa". In Elizabeth A. Johnson (ed.). The Strength of Her Witness: Jesus Christ in the Global Voices of Women. Orbis Books. ISBN 9781608336395.
- Hinga, Teresia (2016). "Africa's Transformative Responses to the Gendered Global HIV and AIDS Syndemic". In Jacquineau Azetsop (ed.). HIV & AIDS In Africa: Christian Reflection, Public Health, Social Transformation. Orbis Books. ISBN 9781608336715.
- Hinga, Teresia (2017). "Of Rainbow Nations, Kente Cloth, and the Virtue of Pluralism: Navigating the Beauty and Dignity of Difference in Search of a Livable Future in Africa". In Peter Cassarella; Mun’im Sirry (eds.). Finding Beauty In The Other: Theological Reflections Across Religious Traditions. Crossroad Publishing. ISBN 9780824523350.
- Hinga, Teresia M. (2019). "The Hummingbird Spirit and Care of our Common Home:An Afro-Theo-Ethical Response to Laudato si'". In Krista E. Hughes; Dhawn B. Martin; Elaine Padilla (eds.). Ecological Solidarities: Mobilizing Faith and Justice for an Entangled World. Penn State Press. pp. 132–146. ISBN 9780271085593.
- Hinga, Teresia (2020). "Tapping the moral wisdom of Africa's Triple Plus heritage of religion and culture". In Myriam Renaud; William Schweiker (eds.). Multi-Religious Perspectives on a Global Ethic. Routledge. pp. 185–197. doi:10.4324/9781003011279-19. ISBN 9781003011279. S2CID 228919475.

=== Journal articles ===
- Hinga, Teresia M. (2002). "African feminist theologies, the global village, and the imperative of solidarity across borders: The case of the Circle of Concerned African Women Theologians". Journal of Feminist Studies in Religion. 18 (1): 79–86. JSTOR 25002427.
