= Puleng LenkaBula =

South African academic

Puleng LenkaBula is a South African academic and university administrator. She is the first ever female vice-chancellor of the University of South Africa (UNISA).

== Education ==
LenkaBula studied theological ethics at the University of South Africa, writing a PhD thesis on the ethics of bioprospecting in 2006.

== Career ==
She was dean of students at the University of the Witwatersrand before joining the University of the Free State (UFS), where she was vice-rector of institutional change, student affairs and community engagement. In November 2020 she was announced as the successor to Mandla Makhanya as principal and vice-chancellor of UNISA, in a unanimous decision by the university council. Her appointment comes into effect on 1 January 2021, though the council has extended Makhanya's term to April 2021 to ensure a smooth handover.

== Works ==
- "From the womb into a hostile world: Christian ethics and sexual abuse against children in South Africa". Journal of Theology for Southern Africa. 114: 55–68. 2002.
- Lenkabula, Puleng (2005). "Justice and Reconciliation in Post-Apartheid South Africa: A South African Woman's Perspective". International Review of Mission. 94 (372): 103–111. doi:10.1111/j.1758-6631.2005.tb00489.x.
- "A journey on the path of an African feminist theologian and pioneer, Mercy Amba Oduyoye: continuing the pursuit for justice in the church and in society". Studia Historiae Ecclesiasticae. 34: 1–27.
- Lenkabula, Puleng (2008). "Beyond Anthropocentricity – Botho/Ubuntu and the Quest for Economic and Ecological Justice in Africa". Religion and Theology. 15 (3–4): 375–394. doi:10.1163/157430108X376591.
