= Angelene Swart =

South African theologican and church leader

Angelene Swart is a South African theologian, educator and church leader. She was the first female president of the Moravian Church in South Africa, serving from 2001 to 2008, and the first female president of the Moravian Church's global Unity Board, elected in 2006. She was also the first female president of the Moravian Church in South Africa from 2001 to 2008 and the first female and lay vice president of the Lutheran Communion in Southern Africa in 2002.
