= Susan Kilonzo =

Professor Susan Mbula Kilonzo
- Born: August 1979 (age 47); Machakos, Kenya
- Occupation: Professor

Academic background
- Education: Bachelor of Arts in Education, Masters of Arts in Sociology of Religion and a Ph.D. Sociology of Religion
- Alma mater: Maseno University

Academic work
- Discipline: Sociology, Religion, Spirituality, Gender, Community development, Education.
- Sub-discipline: Religion and Development, Peace and Conflict studies, Religion, Justice and Gender

Susan Mbula Kilonzo is a professor of sociology at the Department of Religion, Theology, and Philosophy at Maseno University, Kenya. She is a fellow of the Georg Foster Programme of the Alexander von Humboldt Foundation. She is a multidisciplinary researcher in the fields of sociology, community development, peace and security, higher education, and HIV/ AIDS in Africa. Her background training is in Sociology of Religion.

== Early life and education ==
Kilonzo was born in August 1979 in Machakos, Kenya.

She graduated with a Bachelor of Arts in education, and Masters of Arts in Sociology of Religion. Kilonzo earned a Ph.D. in Sociology of Religion at Maseno University. Her dissertation was on Christian Diversity and Community Development in Vihiga District, Kenya.

== Career and work ==
Kilonzo is a professor of sociology at the Department of Religion, Theology and Philosophy, Maseno University. Her background training is in Sociology of Religion. She is a multidisciplinary researcher in the fields of sociology, religion, culture, community development, peace and security, higher education, youth, HIV & AIDS in Africa, and Research Methodology.

Kilonzo is an expert in religion and spirituality, and their relation to development, climate change, gender, mental health, healing, peace, transitional justice, and conflict. She was an Associate research Fellow, Open University, Milton Keynes, UK (2009–2012). She participated in the Georg Forster Research Fellowship Program for Experienced Researchers 2023 at the Otto-Friedrich University of Bamberg, Germany. She was New Europe College (NEC) International affiliate research fellow 2010/2011 with a project, The Potential of the Church as a Community Institution in Peacebuilding in Africa. Lessons from Kenya’ Ethnic Conflicts. She attended conferences, seminars, training workshops and summer schools in over 25 countries across Africa, North & South America, and Europe.

Kilonzo is a member-elected trustee in the Maseno University Board of Trustees. She was elected in the scheme board of trustees on 9 June 2025. She is Chairperson of the Governance & Administration Committee, and member of the Audit and Risk Management Committee. She is an editorial board member of the African Journal of Religion, Philosophy and Culture.

== Research grants and fellowships ==
International Development Centre (African Researchers’ Grant on Youth and Development in Africa), Open University, Milton Keynes, UK (2009), UPEACE Africa (2008–2010).

== Selected works ==
Kilonzo, S. M. (2026). Religion as a resource for mental health management for survivors of violent conflicts in Kenya. In Kilonzo, S.M. & Chitando, E. (Eds.), The Palgrave handbook on religion, health and development in Africa (pp. 977–998). Springer Nature.

Kilonzo, S. M. (2024). The Catholic Church and psychosocial support for survivors of violent conflicts in Kenya's North Rift. In Gies, K., Gunda, M., Chitando, E., Hock, J. & Janneck, L. (Eds.), Going the extra mile: Reflections on biblical studies in Africa and the contributions of Joachim Kügler (pp. 201–223). University of Bamberg Press.

Kilonzo, S. M. (2024). The Catholic Church and psychosocial support for survivors of violent conflicts in Kenya's North Rift. University of Bamberg Press, 201–222. https://doi.org/10.20378/irb-96595.

Kilonzo, S. M. (2024).The uniting power of customary oaths among communities affected by ethnic violence in Kenya's North Rift.. In: Green, C. Sourou J-B., & Gnonzion C., Law, Religion, and Reconciliation in Africa. Africa Sun Media, 2024. 139–154.

Kilonzo, S. M. (2023). African Belief Systems and Gendering of Eco-Justice. In: Scriptura, 122, 2023, 1–15.

Kilonzo, S. M., & Muhoma, C. (2023). Alternative Media and Ethnic Politics in Kenya. In Oxford Research Encyclopedia of Communication. Oxford University Press. https://doi.org/10.1093/acrefore/9780190228613.013.1350.

Kilonzo, S. M., Chitando, E., & Tarusarira, J. (Eds.), (2023).The Palgrave Handbook on Religion, Peacebuilding and Development in Africa. Palgrave Macmillan.

Kilonzo, S. M., & Onkware, K. (2022). The Adaptability of Catholic Church's Amani Mashinani Model in Kenya's North Rift Conflicts. In: International Bulletin of Mission Research (IBMR), 46, 2022, 190–199.

Kilonzo, S. M. (2022). Transitional Justice and the Mitigation of Electoral Violence through Amani mashinani Model in Uasin Gishu County, Kenya. In: Opongo, E. & Murithi, T., Elections, Violence and Transitional Justice in Africa. Routledge, 2022. 136–159.

Kilonzo, S. M. (2022). Women, Indigenous Knowledge Systems and Climate Change in Kenya. In Chitando, E. Conradie, E. & Kilonzo, S. African Perspectives on Religion and Climate Change. Routledge Studies on Religion in Africa and the Diaspora. Routledge. DOI: 10.4324/9781003147909, 2022. 79–90.

Kilonzo, S. M. (2020), Youth, Religion and Development in Africa, in Chitando, E., Gunda, M., & Togarasei, L. (Eds.) Religion and Development in Africa. Bible in Africa Studies (BiAS). 4; Bamberg, University of Bamberg Press), 101–22.

Kilonzo, S. M. & Onkware, K. (2020), Gendered Conflict Resolution: The Role of Women in Amani Mashinani's Peacebuilding Processes in Uasin Gishu County, Kenya. The Journal of Social Encounters, 4(1): 44–56.

Kilonzo, S. M. (2021). Silent peacemakers: Grass-roots transitional justice and peacebuilding by women in Kenya's North Rift conflicts. Journal of the British Academy, 9(2), 53–74.

Kilonzo, S. M. & Ayumba, J. (2021). Women in Colonial East Africa. In Yacob-Haliso O., & Falola T. The Palgrave Handbook of African Women's Studies.(PP.1–17). Palgrave MacMillan.
