= United Church in Zambia =

United Protestant denomination

United Church of Zambia
- Classification: Protestant
- Orientation: United Church (Calvinist and Methodist)
- Polity: Presbyterian
- Associations: World Council of Churches, World Communion of Reformed Churches and World Methodist Council
- Region: Zambia
- Origin: 1965
- Merger of: Missions of the Church of Scotland, the Methodist Missionary Society and the London Missionary Society
- Congregations: 1060 (2006)
- Members: 4,000,000 (2024)
- Official website: uczsynod.org

The United Church of Zambia (UCZ) is a United Protestant denomination in Zambia, founded in 1967 as a merger of several denominations resulting from missions of the Church of Scotland, the Methodist Missionary Society, and the London Missionary Society.

The United Church of Zambia is the largest Protestant denomination in the country and the second largest Christian denomination, after the Roman Catholic Church.

== History ==
The United Church of Zambia owes its beginnings to the work of the London Missionary Society, the Church of Scotland Mission, the Copper Belt Union Church, and the Copper Belt Free Churches.

In the Central African Copper Belt, mining began in the early 1920s. Christians from various areas went to work in the mining towns, and interdenominational worship began in African and European settlements. Aided by existing cooperation in education and welfare, the Church of Scotland, the Methodist Missionary Society, and the London Missionary Society joined together in African areas to form the Copper Belt Union Church (CBUC).

Shortly thereafter, congregations from European areas united as the Free Churches of the Copper Belt (FRCB). In 1945, the CBUC and FCCB united to form the Central African Church in Rhodesia (CACR). In 1958, the Act of Union took place.

In 1965, the IACR joined with the Methodist Church and the Church of Barotseland to form the current United Church of Zambia.

In 2004, it was estimated that the denomination had 1060 churches and 3 million members.

In 2024, it was reported that the denomination had 4 million members, em 10 presbyterys.

In 2020, according to research by Afrobarometer, it was reported that 13% of Zambia's population identified as members of the United Church of Zambia. This corresponded to approximately 2,477,721 people that year. 14.8% of the population described themselves as "Christian" without specifying the denomination.

== Doctrine ==
The denomination subscribes to the Apostles' Creed and the Nicene Creed.

The denomination has undergone Strong influence of Pentecostalism since the 1990s and allows the ordination of women.

== Ecumenical relations ==
The UCZ is member of World Council of Churches, World Communion of Reformed Churches and World Methodist Council.
