= Esha Faki Mwinyihaji =

Kenyan scholar of religion

- Born: 30 August 1971 (age 55)
- Occupations: Academic, Lecturer, Researcher
- Known for: Research on Islam and gender in Africa; author of The Persistence of Divination among the Swahili Muslims in Kenya

Academic background
- Education: PhD in Religion (2010) at Maseno University. M.Phil in Islamic Studies (2001): Earned from Moi University. B.Ed (Arts) Honours (1996): Specialised in Religion and Kiswahili at Moi University.

Academic work
- Discipline: Religion
- Institutions: Maseno University

Esha Faki Mwinyihaji (born 30 August 1971) is a Kenyan scholar of religion and lecturer in Islamic studies at Maseno University. Her scholarship is in Islam and gender, Muslim women's participation in public life, religion, politics, and interfaith relations in East Africa. She examines intersection of religion, gender, and social change among Muslim communities in Kenya, particularly among Swahili-speaking populations.

== Early life and education ==
Mwinyihaji earned a PhD in Religion from Maseno University in 2010. She graduated with a Master of Philosophy in Islamic studies from Moi University in 2001. She has a Bachelor of Education (Arts) in Religion and Kiswahili from Moi University in 1996.

Her doctoral research examined divination practices among Swahili Muslim communities in coastal Kenya, exploring how traditional practices coexist with Islamic belief systems. She later undertook a postdoctoral fellowship at the University of Geneva, Switzerland, through the Foundation for Interreligious and Intercultural Dialogue.

== Career ==
Mwinyihaji taught at Masinde Muliro University of Science and Technology, and Bondo University College, which was later incorporated into Maseno University. The occupational experiences built her scholarly development through engagement with diverse student populations and institutional contexts.She later joined the Department of Religion and Philosophy at Maseno University as a scholar and educator in the field of religious studies.

She teaches a range of courses on Islamic studies, African religions, and intersection of religion and society. Her pedagogic model takes an interdisciplinary approach, enabling students to critically engage with religion not only as a belief system but as a social, cultural, and political force. Mwinyihaji has taught subjects such as Islam and contemporary society, exploring the relevance of Islamic thought in modern contexts; religion and gender, which examines the intersection of faith traditions with gender roles and identities; and religion and politics in Africa, highlighting the complex ways in which religious beliefs shape governance, policy, and public life across the continent. She has also taught African traditional religions, offering students insight into indigenous belief systems and practices, as well as interreligious dialogue, promoting understanding and cooperation among different faith communities.

Mwinyihaji has played an active role in postgraduate supervision, mentoring students through advanced research in religious studies. She has contributed to curriculum development, designing and refining academic programs that respond to contemporary issues in religion and society. Through these combined efforts, she has contributed to growth of religious studies education in the region.

== Islamic studies ==
Mwinyihaji's research examines the relationship between Islam, culture, and social change in East Africa, with particular attention to Muslim communities in Kenya. Her work explores how religious beliefs and practices shape social structures, gender relations, and political participation within contemporary African societies. A major focus of her scholarship is the experiences of Muslim women and the ways in which they negotiate religious teachings, cultural expectations, and modern social realities.

Her studies investigate the participation of Muslim women in public life, including their involvement in politics, media, and community leadership. Through this research, she has analyzed how Muslim women engage with religious traditions while advocating for greater representation and legitimacy in public spaces. Her work contributes to wider academic discussions on gender, religious interpretation, and women's agency within Islamic societies.

Mwinyihaji has also examined the interaction between Islamic teachings and local cultural traditions among Swahili-speaking communities in Kenya. Her doctoral research explored the persistence of divination practices and how such traditions coexist with Islamic belief systems. Her scholarship addresses issues of religion and public life in multi-religious societies, including the role of interfaith dialogue, religious coexistence, and religion's contribution to peacebuilding and social development. A key theme in Mwinyihaji's scholarship is the negotiation of space for Muslim women within religious and societal structures. Her research demonstrates how women draw on both religious knowledge and social realities to assert their roles in leadership and decision-making processes.

Her work has contributed to broader academic discussions on gender equality, religious identity, and social transformation in Africa. By focusing on lived experiences and local contexts, she provides nuanced perspectives on how religion influences everyday life and societal change. Mwinyihaji's research also engages with issues of political participation and media representation, particularly in relation to Muslim communities in Kenya. Her analysis of these topics has helped to deepen understanding of the complex interactions between religion, politics, and identity in contemporary society.

== Community engagement ==
In addition to academic work, Mwinyihaji is involved in community-oriented initiatives that focus on promoting understanding and cooperation among different religious groups. She has participated in research and outreach activities aimed at empowering Muslim women and addressing social challenges within communities. She participates in interfaith dialogue initiatives and collaborations with organizations working on religion and development to foster inclusive and peaceful societies. She has engaged with the African Consortium for Law and Religion Studies concerning religious freedom, law, and social cohesion in Africa.

== Notable works. ==
Mwinyihaji's publications focus on themes of religion, gender, and society in Kenya and the broader East African context. Her work is featured in academic journals, edited volumes, and monographs, with a particular focus on Muslim women's participation in public life, religion, media, and the interaction between Islamic beliefs and indigenous practices.

Necessity Removes Restrictions: Swahili Muslim Women's Perspectives on Their Participation in the Public Sphere, is published in Sharia in Africa Today (2013). Mwinyihaji examines how Muslim women interpret religious teachings in ways that support their engagement in social and political life.

She has also authored The Media, Terrorism and Political Mobilization of Muslims in Kenya (2011), published in the journal Politics and Religion, which analyzes the role of media in shaping Muslim political identity and participation. Kenyan Muslim Women in Media and Politics: Fighting for Legitimacy (2012), explores the challenges faced by Muslim women in achieving visibility and recognition in public spheres.

Her book, The Persistence of Divination among the Swahili Muslims in Kenya: Beliefs and Practices (2010) provides an in-depth study of the coexistence of Islamic beliefs and indigenous practices among Swahili communities in Kenya.
