= Grace Wamue Ngare =

Grace Wamue-Ngare
- Born: June 7, 1964 (age 62)
- Occupations: Professor of Gender and Development Studies

Academic background
- Education: PhD in Gender, Religion and Culture, Kenyatta University (1999) MA in African Culture and Religion, Kenyatta University(1989) Bachelor of Education(Arts)Hons, University of Nairobi(1984), Diploma in Theology-Theological Education by Extension, Presbyterian University of East Africa(2011)
- Alma mater: Kenyatta University, University of Nairobi

Academic work
- Discipline: Gender and Development Studies
- Sub-discipline: Gender, Sexual and Gender Based Violence, African Culture, Gender and Agriculture
- Institutions: Kenyatta University

Grace Wamue Ngare (born June 7, 1964) is an associate professor of gender and development studies and director of the Centre for Gender Equity and Empowerment at Kenyatta University, Kenya. Ngare developed a technological mobile App to enhance the reporting of Sexual Gender Based Violence (SGBV) among students and staff of Kenyatta University, Kenya. She is also a consultant and trainer in gender discourses and development, an area she has published in.

== Early life and education ==
Ngare was born on June 7, 1964.

She completed a Bachelor of Education (Arts) in 1984 from the University of Nairobi, Kenya. In 1989, she received a Master of Arts in African Culture and Religion from Kenyatta University. Ngare completed a Ph.D. in Gender, Religion and Culture at Kenyatta University in 1999. In 2011, she obtained a Diploma in Theology - Theological Education by Extension from the Presbyterian University of East Africa, Kenya.

== Career ==
Ngare's career began as a tutorial fellow in 1989 at the Department of Philosophy and Religious Studies at Kenyatta University. She rose to Associate Professor at Kenyatta University having moved to the Department of Sociology, Gender and Development Studies in 2015.

Ngare is also the Communications and Advocacy Lead at Kenyatta University Women's Economic Empowerment Hub (KU-WEE) under the Bill and Melinda Gates Foundation Grant.

== Grants and awards ==
Ngare has received various research grants and awards. These include:

- Johns Hopkins University project on Gender and COVID-19
- Collaborative for Gender Equity & Empowerment in Education and Labour Systems between Johns Hopkins University & Kenyatta University
- Association of Commonwealth Universities
- European Union-LEAP Agri on Phenotyping Cooking Bananas & Plantains for Food Security
- Leicester Institute of Advanced Studies Fellowship (2018/2019)
- Association of Commonwealth Universities (ACU) Fellowship at Coventry University (2021)
- Lake Victoria Basin Research Initiative
- Norwegian Church Aid on the Tamar Campaign as a Tool to address Sexual Gender-Based Violence in Eastern Democratic Republic of Congo
- Association of African Universities (AAU)
- National Council for Science and Technology (NCST)
- National Research Fund (NRF), Lake Victoria Basin Research Initiative (VicRes)
- The Organization of Social Science Research in Eastern Africa (OSSREA)
- Four (4) month East African Scholars Visiting Award Scheme, at the School of Oriental and African Studies (SOAS), Center for African Studies, University of London, September 2001.

== Publications ==
- Wamue-Ngare, G., Okemwa, P., Miruka, O., Maina, L., Okong’o, G., Kimunio, I., & Kiru, L. (2023). Effectiveness of State and Non-State Actors’ Initiatives in Addressing the Economic Empowerment Needs of Women Survivors of Gender-Based Violence. Kenyatta University women's economic empowerment (KU-WEE) journal, 1(1), 45–69.
- Wamue-Ngare, G. N., Warren, M. A., & Torjesen, K. J. (2023). Combating gender-based violence and fostering women's well-being: Religion as a tool for achieving sustainable development goals in Congo. In Khosrow-Pour, M., Clarke, S., Jennex, M. and Anttiroiko, A. (Eds), Research Anthology on Modern Violence and Its Impact on Society (pp. 1147-1163). IGI Global.
- Wamue-Ngare, G., Okemwa, P., Kimunio, I., Miruka, O., Okong’o, G., Kamau, P., ... & Okoth, S. (2023). Estimating the economic impact of gender-based violence on women survivors: A comparative study of support program interventions in Makueni and Naivasha, Kenya. Atencion Primaria, 1–11.
- Wamue-Ngare, G. (2020). Tiri Concept and its Huge Significance in Africa's Religio-Culture: A reflection on the Gikuyu Beliefs and Practices Related to the Sacredness of Land. Jumuga Journal of Education, Oral Studies, and Human Sciences (JJEOSHS), 3(1), 1–12.
- Wamue-Ngare, G. (2019). Eradicating female genital mutilation (fgm) in Kenya: lessons learnt from Gikuyu women change stories. African Journal of Gender and Women Studies, 4(10), 1.
- Wamue-Ngare, G. N. (2012) in Smith, H., & Hackett, J. The Mungiki Movement: A Source of Religio-Political Conflict in Kenya. Displacing the State: Religion and Conflict in Neoliberal Africa, 85–111.
- Wamue-Ngare, G., & Njoroge, W. N. (2011). Gender paradigm shift within the family structure in Kiambu, Kenya. African journal of social sciences, 1(3), 10–20.
- Wamue-Ngare, G. (2007) Sexual Violence against Women and Girls in Kenya: A Critical Review of the Sexual Offences Bill 2007.
- Wamue, G. N. (2001). Revisiting our indigenous shrines through Mungiki. African Affairs, 100(400), 453–467.
- Wamue, G. (1991) Why The Poor Children Stay Sick. The Human Ecology of Child Health and Welfare in Rural Malawi. The Journal of Eastern African Research and Development Vol. 20
