= All Africa Conference of Churches =

Ecumenical fellowship

All Africa Conference of Churches (AACC, Conférence des Églises de toute l'Afrique or CETA) is an ecumenical fellowship that represents more than 200 million African Christians in 210 national churches and regional Christian councils in 43 African Countries. AACC's head office is in Nairobi, Kenya, and there is a regional office in Lomé, Togo. AACC also has an office in Addis Ababa, Ethiopia which serves as its Liaison Office to the African Union. Its current General Secretary is the Rev. Dr. Fidon Mwombeki, Minister of the Lutheran Church in Tanzania. The Desmond Tutu Conference Centre in Nairobi is an affiliate of the AACC.

== History ==
In 1958 the ecumenically dedicated Presbyterian Akanu Ibiam initiated a conference of Christian organisations and churches in Africa, which led to the foundation of AACC at its first assembly on 20 April 1963 in Kampala, Uganda. The theme of the first assembly was “Freedom and Unity in Christ”. The delegates addressed the colonial situation in the spirit of nationalism that permeated the political scene of the continent at the time. The delegates identified themselves with the aspirations of the peoples of the continent towards development of dignity and a mature personality in Christ and exhorted the churches "to participate wholeheartedly in the building of the African nation". The AACC has accompanied the churches in their engagement in the decolonization and nation-building processes. It played a significant role in the dismantling of apartheid in Southern Africa. The journey towards unity and freedom initiated at Kampala has continued through the following assemblies.

Thus, the AACC continues to stand with the churches in addressing relevant issues that confront the continent, and to provide a platform of collective voices and collective action. Its foundational programmes are theology, mission and evangelism, ecumenical growth and interfaith relations. Core issues on its agenda include social and economic justice (overcoming poverty), health and wholeness (HIV/AIDS) and international relations (governance, ethics and morality). It is engaged in a thorough process of reconfiguring ecumenical relationships and cooperation in the continent, by integrating the churches, national councils, sub-regional fellowships and the continental body itself into a coherent network.

AACC has celebrated its 50th anniversary with a Jubilee Assembly held from 3 to 9 June 2013, also in Kampala.

== Members ==
AACC has 210 members in 43 African countries. The membership comprises Churches, National Christian Councils, Theological and Lay Training Institutions, and other Christian organisations. For operational and administrative reasons AACC has divided the continent into five sub-regions: Northern Africa (5 countries), Eastern Africa and Indian Ocean (7 countries), Southern Africa (10 countries), Central Africa (8 countries) and Western Africa (10 countries). This division ensures that every region is adequately represented in AACC's decision-making bodies. It also enables the AACC to have a better understanding of specific social economic and political issues facing the regions and thus be able to serve them better.
