= Ecumenical Association of Third World Theologians =

The Ecumenical Association of Third World Theologians (EATWOT) is a network of theologians coming primarily from Africa, Asia, and Latin America and interested in creating theology that is relevant for their contexts. The group tended to critique traditional Christian theology as being too European and underscored the need for theology that addressed the challenges of poverty and oppression.

== History ==
O. K. Bimwenyi from the Democratic Republic of the Congo was one of the key figures of the formation of EATWOT. While Bimwenyi was studying in Catholic University of Louvain, he visited the general meeting of the Sisters of the Immaculate Heart of Mary in India in December 1974 and discussed the need for a network of theologians to address the pressing concerns of poverty and oppression in the third world.

In 1976, the first official meeting of EATWOT would be held in Dar es Salaam, Tanzania with Joshua Russell Chandran as its first president until 1981. From this early start, the organization would produce a bi-annually published theological journal entitled Voices from the Third World.

In the beginning, the organization would not allow women to be members. It would only be at the New Delhi meeting in 1981 that women were beginning to be allowed to have a voice in EATWOT. Female figures such as Virginia Fabella and Mercy Amba Oduyoye, the latter who eventually became EATWOT's first female president (1997–2001), would continually challenge the absence of female leadership in the global church and in EATWOT. These efforts would result in the formation of the Women's Commission of EATWOT.

== See also ==
- World Christianity
- World Council of Churches
