= Engelbert Mveng =

Cameroonian Jesuit theologian

The Reverend Dr. Engelbert Mveng SJ
- Church: Society of Jesus
- Other post: University of Yaounde

Personal details
- Born: May 9, 1930 Enamengal
- Died: April 22, 1995 (aged 64) Yaounde
- Denomination: Catholic
- Occupation: Priest, academic, artist
- Education: University of Louvain, Université de Namur
- Alma mater: Catholic University of Lyon
- Distinctions: Broquette-Gonin Prize

Engelbert Mveng, SJ (9 May 1930 – 22 April 1995), was a Cameroonian Jesuit priest, artist, historian, theologian, and anthropologist.

== Early life and religious education ==
Born in a Presbyterian family but baptized in a Catholic church, Mveng received a Christian education from his parents. His intelligence was noticed by a priest, Father Herbard, who sent him to school in Efok, Cameroon from 1943 to 1944. As a teenager, his talent for draftsmanship led him to tutor younger students at a nearby mission school in Minlaba. The next stage of his studies followed in the minor seminary of Akono from 1944 to 1949.

Mveng then completed a year of study in a major seminary in Yaounde, where he learned Latin and Greek. Wanting to engage in the religious life, Mveng first sought to become a Trappist monk. However, he was dissuaded from this by René Marie Graffin, the Archbishop of Yaounde, who informed him of the presence of Jesuits in the Belgian Congo. Hence, in 1951 he became a Jesuit novice in the Djuma novitiate in the Belgian Congo (now the Democratic Republic of the Congo). He lived there between 1954 and 1958, then started his philosophical studies in Europe. He studied at Université de Namur in Belgium, and earned his licentiate from the University of Louvain and the Catholic University of Lyon. At the end of his philosophy studies, he went to Collège Libermann, a Jesuit college in Douala from 1958 to 1960, eventually returning to Lyon to study theology. There, he focused on the philosophy of Chantilly and the theology of Fourviere. At the end of these studies, he was ordained as a priest on September 7, 1963, becoming the first Cameroonian Jesuit priest.

== Academic and professional career ==
In 1963, Mveng submitted a thesis entitled Paganisme et christianisme: christianisation de la civilisation paienne de l'Afrique romaine d'apres la correspondance de saint Augustin (Paganism and Christianity: Christianization of the Pagan Civilization of Roman Africa According to the Correspondence of Saint Augustin). Later, in 1972, Mveng submitted a thesis in history, Les sources grecques de l'histoire negro-africaine depuis Homere jusqu'a Strabon (Greek Sources on Black African History from Homer to Strabon). From 1965 to 1971, he was an assistant professor at the University of Yaounde, whereupon he became a full lecturer, and in 1974 became a full professor. Mveng was also Director of Cultural Affairs in the National Ministry of Education and Culture from 1966 to 1974. Following this role, from 1983 to 1987 he chaired the History department of the University of Yaounde.

In 1963, Mveng wrote Histoire du Cameroun, a 533-page overview of the entirety of Cameroonian history with illustrations and maps. This work was the first academic history of Cameroon to be published. Divided into eight sections, the first half of the book focuses on the precolonial period, while the rest of it covers the colonial history of Cameroon until the date of publishing. While most of the history presented is a secondary source, relying on published works, Mveng also includes a section on labor unions in Cameroon based primarily on then-unpublished writings.

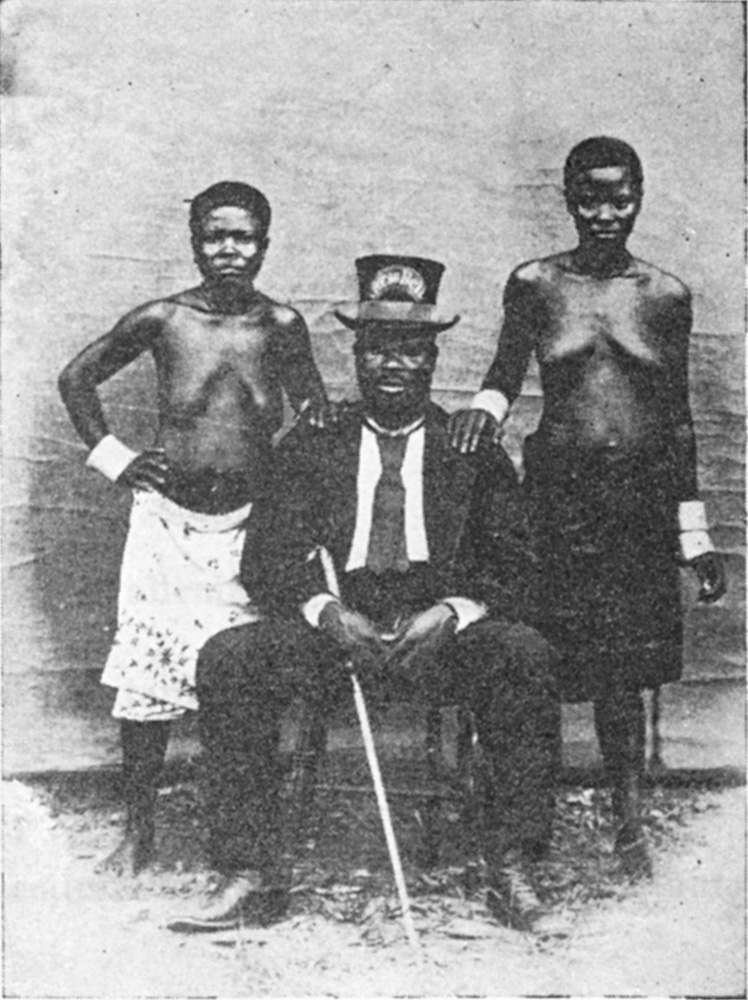
A scan from Mveng's Histoire du Cameroun, depicting King Ndumbe Lobe Bell

Mveng was implicated in the functioning of several intellectual associations. He opened the festival symposium in the first World Festival of Negro Arts (Festival Mondial des Arts Nègres) in Dakar, Senegal in 1966, and was secretary-general of the second festival, held in 1977 in Lagos, Nigeria.

== Religious activities and death ==
Mveng cofounded a congregation of African inspiration, Les Béatitudes (The Beatitudes). He championed various forms of syncretism and inculturation, attempting to incorporate traditional African beliefs into the church. Mveng also proposed the introduction of African music into the Catholic liturgy, an idea later rejected by the white French Archbishop René Graffin.

Mveng was found to have been assassinated at his home in Yaounde on April 23, 1995. The crime was never solved, but occurred near the same time as the murders of several other members of the clergy.

== Theological and political philosophy ==
One of Mveng's key ideas was that of anthropological poverty, in which he connected the concept of physical/material poverty to that of cultural impoverishment and the state of being denied one's own history. He considered this deprivation of culture and identity from a group to be a consequence of slavery and colonialism, and linked this to the effects of Western Christianity on the African religious experience.

Much of Mveng's work falls into the category of African theology, particularly that which sought to examine the political and material state of Africa through a theological lens. As a theological method, Mveng employed contextualization, maintaining that the African theological discourse comes from a historical-cultural situation unique to Africa, and inculturation, placing the Christian revelation in an African cultural context. The main theme of Mveng's work, as he had stated it, is centered on his concept of a "theology of life" which triumphs over the forces of death.

== Mveng as an artist ==
The chapel of Hekima University College is painted with a Eucharistic fresco conceived and designed by Mveng, which was executed by the painter Stephen Lobalu. The Holy Angels Catholic Church of Chicago, now Our Lady of Africa, bears a mural painted by Mveng in 1990. Mveng also painted the Ugandan Martyrs Altar in the chapel of Libermann College in Douala, Cameroon. He was commissioned for a painting of Mary in the Basilica of the Annunciation in Nazareth, Israel.

== Principal works ==
- Si quelqu'un… Chemin de croix (If someone... Way of the Cross), Tours, Mame, 1962.
- Histoire du Cameroun (History of Cameroon), Paris, 1963
- Les sources grecques de l’histoire négro-africaine depuis Homère jusqu’à Strabon (Greek Sources of African History: From Homer to Strabo) (thesis), Paris, Présence Africaine, 1972.
- Balafons: Poèmes (Balafons: Poems), Yaoundé, Clé, 1972.
- L’ art et l’artisanat africains (African Art and the African Artist), Yaoundé, Clé, 1980.

=== Theological works ===
- L’Art d’Afrique noire. Liturgie cosmique et langage religieux (The Art of Black Africa: Cosmic Liturgy and Religious Language), Paris Mame, 1964, 159 p.
- L’Afrique dans l’Église. Paroles d’un croyant (Africa in the Church: Words of a Believer), Paris, L’Harmattan, 1985, 228 p.
- Spiritualité et libération en Afrique (Spirituality and Liberation in Africa), (ed.), Paris, L’Harcanamattan, 1987, 123 p.
- Théologie libération et cultures africaines. Dialogue sur l’anthropologie négro-africaine (Liberation Theology and African Cultures: Dialogue on Black African Anthropology), (in collaboration with B.L. Lipawing), Yaoundé/ Paris, Clé/ Présence Africaine, 1996, 232 p.

== See also ==
- Political theology in Sub-Saharan Africa
- Jean-Marc Ela
