= Agbonkhianmeghe Orobator =

The Reverend Agbonkhianmeghe Emmanuel Orobator S.J.
- Dean of Jesuit School of Theology of Santa Clara University
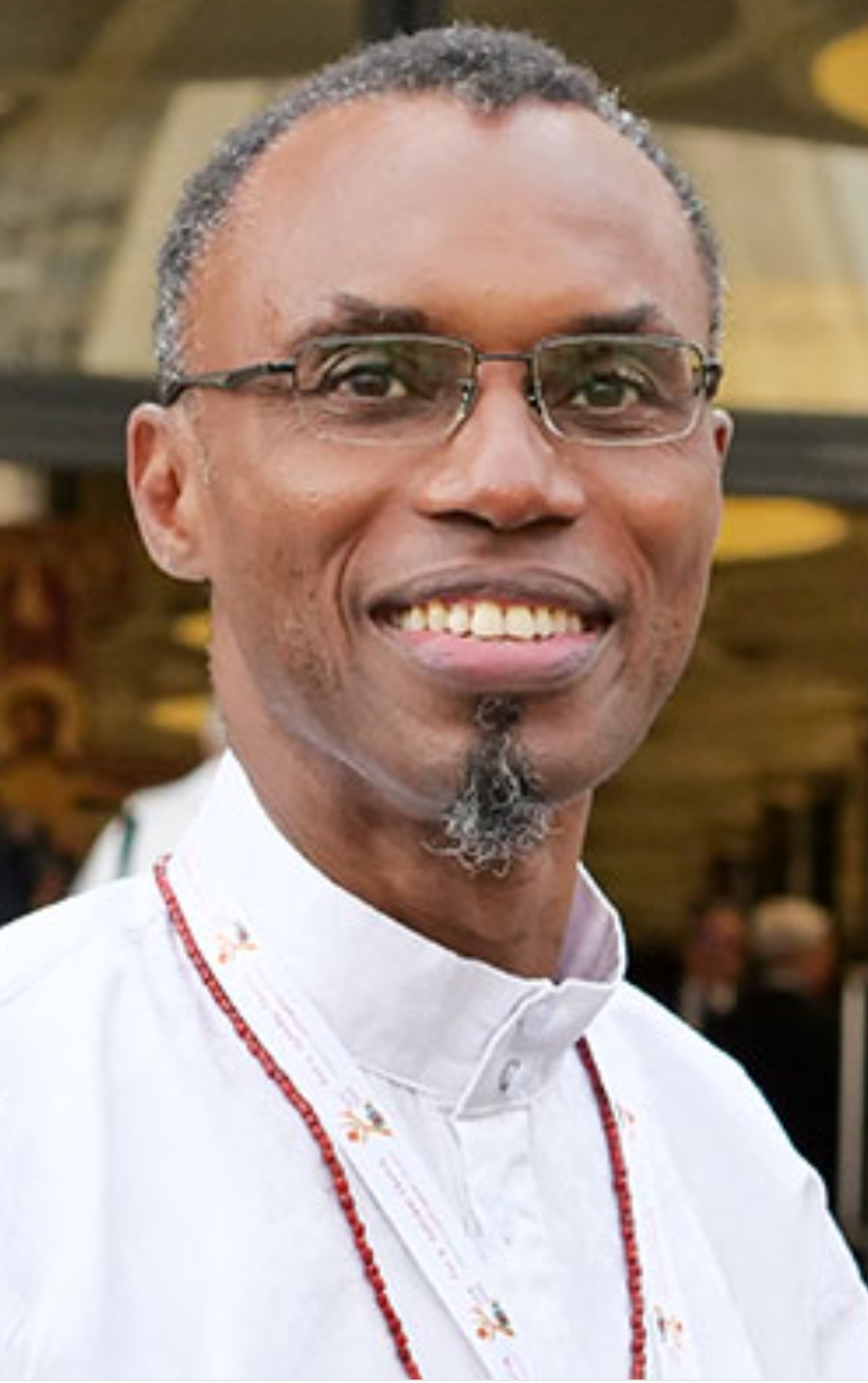
- Church: Catholic Church
- Previous post: Former Superior of East Africa Jesuits

Orders
- Ordination: 1998

Personal details
- Born: January 1, 1967 (age 59) Benin City, Nigeria

Agbonkhianmeghe E. Orobator, SJ (born 1967) is a Nigerian Jesuit priest, theologian, and author who has served as dean of the Jesuit School of Theology of Santa Clara University in California since 2023.

He is recognized as one of the most influential voices in contemporary African theology and for his commitment to social justice, interreligious dialogue, and ecclesial reform.

== Early life and education ==
Agbonkhianmeghe Orobator was born in 1967 in Benin City, Nigeria, into a family that practiced traditional African religions. His interest in Catholicism emerged during adolescence, after attending an Easter Vigil Mass at a local Jesuit parish. He was baptized at the age of 16, at which point he received the name Emmanuel, a symbolic choice meaning "God with us," reflecting his spiritual encounter with Christ in an African context. He saw the works of the American Jesuits as fully devoted to the service of others, resonant of an African anthropology of Ubuntu that teaches "a person is a person through other persons." This experience shaped his theological approach, which emphasizes culturally contextualized theology.

After two years of university studies in linguistics and African languages, Orobator joined the Society of Jesus (Jesuits) in 1986. He began his philosophical studies at Saint Peter Canisius Institute in Kinshasa, Democratic Republic of Congo, and later pursued theology at Hekima University College in Nairobi, Kenya.

He continued his theological education in the United States at the Jesuit School of Theology of Santa Clara University, where he earned a licentiate in sacred theology. He later completed a PhD in theology and religious studies at the University of Leeds in the United Kingdom, specializing in systematic theology and ethics. He also holds an MBA from Georgetown University.

== Ministry and leadership ==
Ordained a priest in 1998, Father Orobator has held numerous leadership roles within the Jesuit order and academia. From 2009 to 2014, he served as Provincial Superior of the Jesuits of Eastern Africa.

In 2017, he was appointed President of the Jesuit Conference of Africa and Madagascar, a position he held until 2023. In this role, he coordinated Jesuit initiatives across the continent, particularly in education, social justice, and interreligious dialogue.

He has taught theology at Hekima University College (Kenya), St Augustine College of South Africa), and Marquette University (US). He also serves on the board of directors of Georgetown University and is a member of the editorial board of Theological Studies.

In 2019, he took part in a reconciliation process at the Vatican, at the request of Pope Francis, serving as a preacher to help foster peace among all the leaders of South Sudan.

Pope Francis called upon him to serve as a synodal father during the Synod on Synodality, held in two sessions in 2023.

In August 2023, he was named Dean of the Jesuit School of Theology of Santa Clara University in California, marking international recognition of his theological expertise and intellectual leadership.

=== Theological vision ===
Father Orobator's theological work is deeply rooted in African spirituality, the anthropology of Ubuntu philosophy, and dialogue among religious traditions. He advocates for an inclusive Church that listens to African voices, promotes the role of women, and addresses ecological concerns. He describes himself as a “Christian animist," embracing the spiritual heritage of his African origins as a path to Christ.

== Awards ==
Father Orobator received the ‘’Hubert Walter Award for Reconciliation and Interfaith Co-operation’’ in 2024.

== Bibliography ==
Orobator is the author and editor of the following works:

- From Christ to Kairos (2005)
- Theology Brewed in an African Pot (2008)
- Feminist Catholic Theological Ethics: Conversations in the World Church (co-editor) (2014)
- Religion and Faith in Africa: Confessions of an Animist (2018)
- The Pope and the Pandemic: Lessons in Leadership in a Time of Crisis (2021), awarded by the Catholic Media Association
- African Ecological Ethics & Spirituality for Cosmic Flourishing: An African Commentary on Laudato Si (with Stan Chu Ilo) (2022)
- The Church We Want: African Catholics Look to Vatican III (editor)

He is also a member of the editorial board of the journal Marriage, Families & Spirituality.
