= Laurenti Magesa =

Catholic priest

The Reverend Father Laurent Magesa
- Father
- Church: Catholic Church
- Diocese: Musoma

Personal details
- Died: August 11, 2022 (aged 75–76); Dar Es Salaam, Tanzania

Laurenti Magesa (1946 – August 11, 2022) was a Catholic priest and theologian from Tanzania. He helped develop African theology, writing a dozen books on topics such as African Christology and African spirituality. He has served as a parish priest and taught theology at schools in Kenya, Tanzania, and the United States.

== Early life and career ==
Magesa was born in 1946 in northern Tanzania, along the shores of Lake Victoria. He attended primary school in Musoma and then attended secondary and high school at St. Mary’s Seminary in Mwanza, Tanzania, graduating in 1968. He earned a degree in theology at Makerere University in Uganda in 1974, before earning an MA and PhD from the University of Ottawa. From 1985 until 2000, he served as a parish priest at several Catholic parishes in Musoma, Tanzania.

Magesa published more than 100 academic articles and numerous books. He taught at Hekima University College, a Jesuit school of theology in Nairobi, the Catholic University of Eastern Africa, and Kipalapala Major Seminary in Tabora, Tanzania. He was a scholar in residence or visiting scholar at Xavier University in Cincinnati, Ohio, DePaul University in Chicago, and the Maryknoll School of Theology in New York. He received an honorary Doctorate of Humane Letters from DePaul University in 2014.

== Works on African religion and Africa theology ==
Magesa's academic works focused on moral theology. His articles and books sought to explore ideas about Jesus, the church, and Christian ethics in an African context. Much of his work falls into the area of African theology known as the theology of inculturation. In reflecting on his theological work, Magesa explained that he believes that African conceptions of theology differ from those of the West: "I have grown more and more to accept that although we may all see the same reality, we may, and do, at the same time see different things in reality."

Magesa's most influential work is "What Is Not Sacred? African Spirituality." In this book, Magesa explained the central ideas that are common to traditional African religions. He argued that African religions see spirituality in all human interactions with the world. He also suggested that African religious ideas are consistent rather than in conflict with Christian ideas. This book builds on one of Magesa's earlier books on African religion, African Religion: The Moral Traditions of Abundant Life.

== Published works ==
- The Church and Liberation in Africa (1976)
- (with A. Shorter) African Christian Marriage (1977)
- (with Jesse Mugambi) Jesus in Africa christianity : experimentation and diversity in African Christology (1989)
- (with J. N. K. Mugambi) The Church in African Christianity (1990)
- African Religion: The Moral Traditions of Abundant Life (1997)
- (with Z. Nthamburi) Democracy and Reconciliation in African Christianity (1999)
- Christian Ethics in Africa (2002)
- Anatomy of Inculturation: Transforming the Church in Africa (2004)
- Rethinking Mission: Evangelization in Africa in a New Era (2006)
- African Religion in the Dialogue Debate: From Intolerance to Coexistence (2010)
- What Is Not Sacred? African Spirituality (2013)
- The Post-conciliar Church in Africa: No Turning Back the Clock (2016)
