= Cluster Publications =

South African non-profit publishing enterprise

Cluster Publications is a non-profit publishing enterprise of the Pietermaritzburg Cluster of Theological Institutions (South Africa). The Cluster, founded in 1990, is an ecumenical partnership of the Evangelical Seminary of Southern Africa, the School of Religion and Theology of the University of KwaZulu-Natal, and St Joseph’s Theological Institute. (A founding member of the Cluster, the Federal Theological Seminary of South Africa, closed in 1992.)

== History ==
As soon as the Cluster began, plans were laid for a publications house. Cluster Publications took shape under the leadership of Professor Jim Cochrane, Bernard Connor OP and Professor Gerald West in order to provide contextual theological books at affordable prices for South African scholars and students and their colleagues throughout Africa.

The first years of Cluster Publications coincided with the last days of apartheid and some of the publications reflected that concern. It also published one of the first African books of feminist theology, Women Hold up Half the Sky in 1991.

Since 1994, the most important themes of South African life have been reflected in its publication list: contextual biblical hermeneutics, gender issues, HIV and AIDS, oral history, philosophical and ethical issues, significant figures in South African church history, and socio-political issues. Cluster Publications collaborates with the Circle of Concerned African Women Theologians and has published eight Circle books.

In 2008 it launched two new series of books. “Signs of the Times” will focus on the church’s response to important issues such as climate change and same-sex marriage. “Early Christian Voices in Africa” will publish primary source materials.

Its authors and editors reflect a wide spectrum of important voices in contextual theology: Stuart Bate, Jim Cochrane, Steve de Gruchy, Philippe Denis, Jonathan Draper, Musa W Dube, Beverley Haddad, Musimbi Kanyoro, Xolile Keteyi, Madipoane Masenya (ngwana’ Mphahlele), Sarojini Nadar, Nyambura J Njoroge, Klaus Nürnberger, Teresa Okure, Isabel Apawo Phiri, Susan Rakoczy, Willem Saayman, Augustine Shutte, McGlory Speckman, Gerald West and Gunther Wittenberg.

Cluster Publications is run by a committee composed of representatives of the Cluster institutions, together with a small administrative staff.
