= Emmanuel Katongole =

Emmanuel Katongole may refer to:

- Emmanuel Katongole (businessman)
- Emmanuel Katongole (theologian)
