= Half the sky =

"Women hold up half the sky" is a famous quote by former Chinese Communist Party chairman Mao Zedong.

Half the sky or Women Hold Up Half the Sky may refer to:

- Half the Sky, a 2009 book by Nicholas Kristof and Sheryl WuDunn
- Half the Sky, a 2012 PBS documentary inspired by the 2009 book
- Half the Sky movement, inspired by the Kristof–WuDunn book
- Half the Sky Feminist Theatre, a Canadian theatre group
- Women Hold Up Half the Sky, a 1978 artwork by Australian artist Ann Newmarch
- Women Hold Up Half the Sky a 1991 book of African feminist theology published by Cluster Publications
- Women Hold Up Half the Sky, a 2012 Exhibition at the South African History Archive
- Women Hold Up Half the Sky (album), a 1986 album by Ruby Turner
- Women Hold Up Half the Sky (exhibition), 1995 exhibition and book at the National Gallery of Australia
- Women hold up half the sky: The orientation of art in the post-war Pacific, a 1996 exhibition and book at the Monash University Gallery
- Women Hold Up Half the Sky Award, former name of a South Australian award

== See also ==
- The Other Half of the Sky: A China Memoir, a 1975 American documentary film
