= UN Sustaining Peace Agenda =

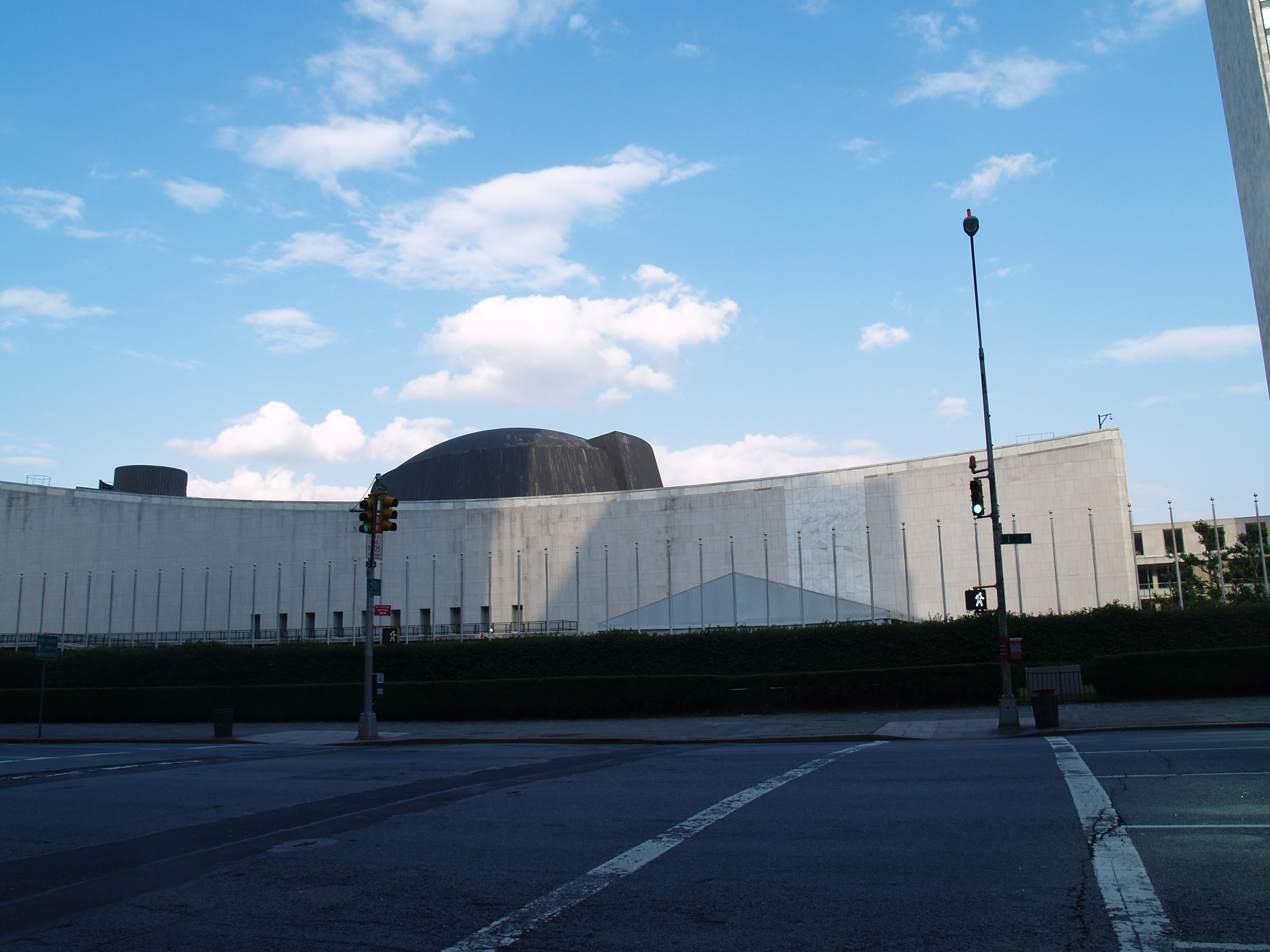
UN General Assembly Building

The UN Sustaining Peace Agenda is a comprehensive concept and framework adopted by the United Nations (UN) to address the root causes of violent conflict and foster long-term peace and stability. It encompasses activities aimed at preventing the outbreak, escalation, continuation, and recurrence of conflict while promoting reconciliation, recovery, and sustainable development. The concept marks a paradigm shift from post-conflict peacebuilding to a preventive and inclusive approach to global peace efforts.

== Historical background ==
The concept of Sustaining Peace was formalized on April 27, 2016, when the UN General Assembly and Security Council adopted twin resolutions A/RES/70/262 and S/RES/2282. These resolutions built on earlier peacebuilding frameworks, such as the 2007 UN Policy Committee decision, to address the limitations of traditional post-conflict interventions. Sustaining Peace represents an ambitious agenda to enhance the UN's capacity to prevent conflict and support national governments in fostering lasting peace.

== Definition ==
Sustaining Peace is both a goal and a process, defined as:

- Preventing the outbreak, escalation, continuation, and recurrence of violent conflict.
- Addressing root causes of conflict through inclusive political processes, rule of law, access to justice, and socio-economic development.
- Promoting reconciliation and building national capacities for recovery and resilience.

The concept applies at all stages of the conflict cycle—before, during, and after violent conflict—and integrates humanitarian, development, and peacebuilding efforts.

== Core principles ==
- Prevention-Oriented: Sustaining Peace focuses on proactive measures to address the drivers of conflict, such as systemic discrimination, exclusion, and marginalization.
- Inclusivity: It emphasizes the meaningful participation of all societal groups, particularly women, youth, and marginalized communities, in peace processes.
- National Ownership: National governments and local stakeholders hold the primary responsibility for leading peacebuilding efforts.
- Coherence and Integration: The approach calls for coordination across UN entities and alignment with global agendas like the Sustainable Development Goals (SDGs).

== Link to sustainable development goals ==
Sustaining Peace is closely aligned with the 2030 Agenda for Sustainable Development, particularly SDG 16+: promoting peaceful and inclusive societies, ensuring access to justice, and building accountable institutions. The concept also supports other SDGs, such as gender equality (SDG 5) and climate action (SDG 13), by addressing socio-economic and environmental drivers of conflict.

== See also ==
- Peacebuilding
- Sustainable Development Goals
- United Nations Charter
