= Fulata Moyo =

Malawian theologian

- Citizenship: Malawi
- Education: University of Malawi, Chancellor College University of Zimbabwe Master's Degree University of KwaZulu-Natal Ph.D
- Occupation: Theologian
- Spouse: Solomon Moyo
- Honours: Human Rights Defender in 2013, Human Rights Defender Initiative, Carter Center USA

Fulata Lusungu Mbano Moyo is a Malawian systematic and feminist theologian who is an advocate for gender justice. Moyo has written over twenty-eight journal articles. She is known for her contributions to African women's theology, contextual biblical studies, and the promotion of gender justice within church and society. Moyo has served in academic institutions, ecumenical organizations, and international initiatives addressing issues of gender, religion, HIV/AIDS, human trafficking and sexual exploitation. She also worked with Elisabeth Schüssler Fiorenza on feminist hermeneutics. In 2018, she was appointed to an independent expert panel to review UNAIDS policies and processes for addressing and preventing harassment. In 2020, Moyo founded "STREAM", a US registered NGO that supports and mentors survivors of sex trafficking, which in 2021 was registered in Malawi as Thimlela-STREAM.

== Early life and education ==
Fulata Mbano was born in northern Malawi, a member of the Ngoni people from Mzimba District. Her great grandfather, Songea, was a warrior chief. Her name, Fulata, means she was born feet first. Her father started his own church after he was not accepted in mainline churches due to his polygamy.

Moyo is a survivor of childhood sexual abuse. She grew up in a small village called Mateyo Mbano Village, and went to primary school at Engcongolweni Lazaro Jere, five kilometers to the nearest town, Ekwendeni. She attended a Roman Catholic high school, Marymount Girls Secondary School, before going on to study education at the University of Malawi, Chancellor College.

Moyo completed a master's degree in Christian thought, systematic and feminist theology from the University of Zimbabwe in 1993. She earned a PhD from the School of Religion and Theology at the University of KwaZulu-Natal in South Africa in 2009, with a focus on ethics, gender and religion. She was a research fellow at Yale University's Center for Interdisciplinary Research on AIDS. She has also trained as a mediator, facilitator of the healing of memories with the Institute of Healing of Memories in South Africa, and studied Viktor Frankl's Logotherapy.

== Career ==
Moyo served as a member of the faculty at the University of Malawi in the Department of Theology and Religious Studies, and became a teaching assistant in the School of Religion and Theology at the University of KwaZulu-Natal as she worked on her PhD. She was trained in Contextual Bible Studies when she became involved in the Tamar Campaign, which sought to address violence against women and children using contextual study of the Bible. She undertook a six-years of ethnographic research in southern Malawi, hoping that the existing matrilineal system would "translate into something of a matriarchal empowerment - where women have as much final say as the men in a patrilineal society", but was disappointed to see the pervasiveness of patriarchy even in a matrilocal system that also embraced Christian values of justice. During her research in 1999 to 2005, the Malawian communities experienced the peak of the HIV/AIDS epidemic, which impacted intergenerational women much more than men. This reality also shaped her research into becoming more about gender and sexual justice. She applied for ordination in the Presbyterian Church but was "silently refused."

Moyo worked for the World Council of Churches as Program Executive for Women in Church and Society (which later became a Just Community of Women and Men) from 2007 until 2019. She was based in Geneva but worked with the 350 member churches in at least 110 countries. She encouraged churches to adopt the "Thursdays in Black" campaign against rape and violence, which was inspired by the Mothers of the Disappeared in Argentina who protested at the Plaza de Mayo on Thursdays, Women in Black in Israel and the women in Rwanda, DRC and Bosnia who were already articulating their experience of rape as a weapon of war.

For the 2016–2017 academic year, Moyo was a visiting scholar and was also invited to be part of the visiting research fellows on Women's Studies and African Religions at Harvard Divinity School, she had to defer from the visiting research fellowship on grounds of health complications but as visiting scholar, she developed an Ethic of Care to help religious communities respond to women who had survived sex trafficking. She also worked with Elisabeth Schüssler Fiorenza on feminist hermeneutics. In 2018, she was appointed to an independent expert panel to review UNAIDS policies and processes for addressing and preventing harassment.

In 2020, Moyo founded "STREAM", a US registered NGO that supports and mentors survivors of sex trafficking, which in 2021 was registered in Malawi as Thimlela-STREAM to focus on prevention, protection and mitigation of human trafficking that focusses on the survivors. For prevention purposes, Thimlela-STREAM started with the empowerment of women through entrepreneurship baking bread for business in Chindindi and Ndonda communities in Mzimba District, Northern Malawi. In Malawi, Mzimba is one of the hot spots of human trafficking that has also become a human trafficking corridor between East Africa and South Africa.

Moyo is a member of the Circle of Concerned African Women Theologians, first participating in Nairobi and then restarting the Malawi chapter. Moyo succeeded Isabel Apawo Phiri and preceded Rachel NyaGondwe Fiedler; she convened the chapter's third and fourth conferences at Chancellor College in 1996 and 1998. She served as the Pan-African General Coordinator of the Circle from 2007 to 2013. As a member of faculty at University of Malawi, she served as the Secretary of the Board of Diploma in Theological Studies in 1996, and a Deputy Director of the Center of Conflict Resolution at University of Malawi She was General Coordinator from 2007 to 2013. She is also a member of the Community Voices in Peace and Pluralism in Africa, and the Board of Life and Peace Institute in Sweden. She is the Vice President of the AfriAus iLEAC Board, a member of the Board of Women International Peace Center (WIPC).

=== Writing ===
Moyo has written and published widely in five languages. Her writings have predominantly addressed religious and cultural influences on gender construction and women's sexuality. She argues that religious scripture must be interpreted in the context of women's experiences, which will help raise awareness of issues that dehumanize women.

Moyo was a contributor to AfricaPraying : a handbook on HIV-AIDS sensitive sermon guidelines and liturgy, published in 2003. She co-edited Women Writing Africa: Eastern African Region, published by Feminist Press in 2007. She has been a guest editor for the Ecumenical Review in 2012 and the International Review of Mission in 2015.

== Award ==
Named a Human Rights Defender in 2013 in the Human Rights Defender Initiative, Carter Center USA.

== Selected publications ==
=== Journal articles ===
- Banda, Dixie M.; Moyo, Fulata Lusungu (2001). "The role of the Church in combating HIV/AIDS in Malawi: challenges and prospects". Journal of Constructive Theology. 7 (1): 45–61.
- Moyo, Fulata Lusungu (2004). "Religion, spirituality and being a woman in Africa: gender construction within the African religio-cultural experiences". Agenda: Empowering Women for Gender Equity. 61 (61): 72–78. JSTOR 4066604.
- Moyo, Fulata Lusungu (2004). "Sex, gender, power and HIV/AIDS in Malawi: threats and challenges to women being Church". Journal of Constructive Theology. 10 (1): 85–102.
- Moyo, Fulata (2004). "Can Divorce be a Solution to Marital Problems in a Christian Marriage?". The Ecumenical Review. 56 (4): 437–447. doi:10.1111/j.1758-6623.2004.tb00530.x.
- Moyo, Fulata Lusungu (2005). "The red beads and white beads: Malawian women's sexual empowerment in the HIV and AIDS era". Journal of Constructive Theology. 11 (1): 53–66.
- Moyo, Fulata Lusungu (2006), “’When the Telling Itself is a Taboo’: The Phoebe Practice,“ Religion in Malawi No. 13, 16-22, reprinted in Jonathan S. Nkhoma, Rhodian Munyenyembe and Hany Longwe (eds), Mission in Malawi. Essays in Honour of Klaus Fiedler, Mzuzu: Mzuni Press, 2021, 449-463.
- Moyo, Fulata Lusungu (2012). "We Demand Bread and Roses When We are Hired: Gender Justice in Workplaces: A Feminist Ethical Perspective". The Ecumenical Review. 64 (3): 254–266. doi:10.1111/j.1758-6623.2012.00172.x.
- Moyo, Fulata Lusungu (2016). ""Traffic Violations": Hospitality, Foreignness, and Exploitation: A Contextual Biblical Study of Ruth". Journal of Feminist Studies in Religion. 32 (2): 83–94. doi:10.2979/jfemistudreli.32.2.07. JSTOR 10.2979/jfemistudreli.32.2.07. S2CID 152203277.
- Moyo, Fulata Lusungu (2020). "Healing Together: Mission as a Journey of Healing Traumatic Memories". International Review of Mission. 109 (1): 5–14. doi:10.1111/irom.12305. S2CID 219493390.

=== Book chapters ===
- Moyo, Fulata Lusungu (2002). "Singing and dancing women's liberation: my story of faith". In Isabel Apawo Phiri; Devarakshanam Betty Govinden; Sarojini Nadar (eds.). Her-stories : hidden histories of women of faith in Africa. Cluster Publications. OCLC 50682475.
- Moyo, Fulata Lusungu (2012). "Navigating Healing: A Narrative Theology of Eschatological Hopes Healing". In Isabel Apawo Phiri; Sarojini Nadar (eds.). African Women, Religion, and Health: Essays in Honor of Mercy Amba Ewudziwa Oduyoye. Wipf and Stock. pp. 243–256.
- Moyo, Fulata Lusungu (2017). "'Ukugqiba inkaba'—Burying the Umbilical Cord: An African Indigenous Ecofeminist Perspective on Incarnation". In Grace Ji-Sun Kim; Hilda P. Koster (eds.). Planetary Solidarity: Global Women's Voices on Christian Doctrine and Climate Justice. Fortress Press. pp. 179–192.
- Moyo, Fulata Lusungu (2020). "Church and Politics: The Case of Livingstonia Synod". In S Nzunda; Ross (eds.). Church, Law and Political Transition in Malawi 1992-1994. Blantyre: Kachere Series. pp. 133–146.
- Moyo, Fulata Lusungu (2021). "Called to Lament Injustice and Prophesy Equality, Justice, Peace and Healing for all". In Ezra Chitando; Esther Mombo; Masiiwa Ragies Gunda (eds.). That all may live!: essays in honour of Nyambura J. Njoroge. University of Bamberg Press. pp. 47–57. ISBN 9783863098117.

Desmond Tutu, Humour and Social Justice, Sarojini Nadar, Tinyiko Maluleke, Dietrich Werner, Vicentia Kgabe & Rudolf Heinz (Eds), Ecumenical Encounters with Desmond Tutu: Visions for Justice, Dignity and Peace, Regnum Books/UWC Press, 2022, (p139-143)

Lockdown and Sexual Exploitation, Chammah J. Kaunda (Ed.), World Christianity and Covid-19: Looking Back and Looking Forward, Palgrave Macmillan, 2023, (pp133–149).

== Personal life ==
Moyo was married to Solomon Moyo until his death from liver cancer in 1999. She has written about her experience of widowhood.
