= Jesse Mugambi =

Kenyan academic (born 1947)

Jesse N. K. Mūgambi
- Born: Jesse Ndwiga Kanyua Mugambi; 6 February 1947 (age 79); Kiangoci, Embu District, Kenya
- Occupations: Professor of philosophy and religious studies
- Known for: Scholar of African Christianity and Phenomenology of Religion
- Awards: Elder of the Order of the Burning Spear (EBS); Fellow of the Kenya National Academy of Sciences (FKNAS).

Academic background
- Education: University of Nairobi

Jesse Ndwiga Kanyua Mūgambi (born 6 February 1947) is a full professor of philosophy and religious studies at the University of Nairobi (UON) with professional training in education and philosophy of religion. President Emilio Mwai Kibaki honored Mugambi with the title of Elder of the Order of the Burning Spear (EBS). In 1992, he founded Acton Publishers, an academic and scholarly press.

== Biography ==
=== Early life and education ===
Mūgambi was born on 6 February 1947 in Kiangoci, Embu county. Both of his parents were committed Anglicans and his father was a lay leader, preacher, and evangelist. After high school, Mūgambi enrolled at Machakos Teacher Training College (MTTC), Kenya, in 1966–67. In 1968, he studied at Kenyatta College in Nairobi, where he specialized in teaching Religious Education and English. He also studied at Westhill College of Education, Birmingham, UK, and conducted historical research at the CMS Archives in London (1969–70).

In 1971, Mūgambi attended the University of Nairobi for undergraduate and postgraduate studies. In 1978, he embarked on his research for his PhD, focusing on Ludwig Wittgenstein's entitled "Problems of Meaning in Discourse with Reference to Religion." While writing he was influenced by Kwasi Wiredu, who was then in the Department of Philosophy at the University of Ghana, Legon. He participated in an ecumenical research project to document the practice of ecumenism at the local level in eastern Africa. The research was published in 1982 as Ecumenical Initiatives in Eastern Africa.

=== Early career ===
After graduation from the University of Nairobi, Mūgambi became active in the ecumenical movement. In 1970, he participated in the formation and launch of the Christian Student Council (the Kenyan SCM) and in the National Association of Religious Education Teachers (NARET). He later served as the Africa Theology Secretary for the World Student Christian Federation (1974–76). He has also held various posts in the World Council of Churches (WCC) from 1975 until today.

Mūgambi joined the academic staff of the University of Nairobi in 1976 and rose through the ranks to full professorship in 1993. He has taught Philosophy of Religion; Religion and Science; Comparative Study of Religions; Contemporary Religious Thought; Modern Trends in Christian Thought. He has also taught African Christian Theology. Later on, he began teaching Phenomenology of Religion in the postgraduate syllabus.

=== Honors ===
He is a fellow of the Kenya National Academy of Sciences (FKNAS) and was conferred a national honor as an Elder of the Order of the Burning Spear (EBS) on 12 December 2010, by the late President Emilio Mwai Kibaki, at a ceremony at State House Nairobi, after the promulgation of a new Kenyan Constitution on 27 August 2010.

== Academic and religious work ==
In 1990, he addressed the General Committee of the All Africa Conference of Churches on 30 March in Nairobi, reflecting on "The Future of the Church and the Church of the Future in Africa". This event was a few weeks after Nelson Mandela's 11 February 1990 release and Namibia's national independence on 21 March of the same year. In his address, Mūgambi suggested that African Christianity must shift theological gear from the paradigm of liberation, which emphasized the Exodus motif, to that of reconstruction, which emphasizes the post-Exilic motif. He later elaborated this insight in his book From Liberation to Reconstruction: African Christian Theology after the Cold War.

=== Hermeneutics ===
Mūgambi is Africa's Co-Editor of the Cambridge Dictionary of Christianity, to which he has contributed more than ten articles, mainly on hermeneutics.

In 1998, Mūgambi claimed that the time was overdue for African Christian theologians to engage in theological introspection, transcending ecclesiological description and theological anthropology. He cited Bernard Lonergan as a possible role model in that approach at a meeting in Hammanskraal, near Pretoria. Mūgambi delivered the keynote address "Foundations for an African Approach to Biblical Hermeneutics", which was published in 2001.

In 2004, Mūgambi co-edited a book on New Testament Hermeneutics, to which he contributed a chapter. The following year he addressed a conference at Makerere University, on "African Hermeneutics in a Global Context", published in 2007 as a chapter in Interpreting Classical Religious Texts in Contemporary Africa, edited by Knut Holter. There is much hermeneutical discourse in Mūgambi's book (co-authored with Michael R. Guy) titled Contextual Theology Across Cultures, published in 2009.

Mūgambi is critical of Rudolf Bultmann's project of "demythologization", on the ground that hermeneutically, myth cannot be abstracted from the Gospel. Any attempt at 'demythologization' results in new myths. Instead of "demythologization", Mūgambi urges for "re-mythologization". He says of Bultmann, "in (his) attempt to satisfy scientific positivism by denouncing myth (he) ends up destroying the reality of religion as a pillar of culture." For Mūgambi, as with Jaspers, "myth is indispensable in cultural constructions of reality". To Mūgambi, therefore, reconstruction in Africa has to be anchored in a) the formulation of new myths to replace the negative stereotypes used for the indoctrination of Africans under imperialism and missionary tutelage, and b) re-interpreting the old myths, for the survival of the African peoples. He suggests that the myth of "a vanishing people must be replaced by the myth of a resurgent and resilient people", while the myth of "desperate people must be replaced by the myth of a people full of hope. The myth of a hungry people must be replaced by the myth of a people capable of feeding themselves, and so on."

=== Missiology ===
In 1989, Mūgambi published "The Biblical Basis for Evangelization". This was in the same year that he facilitated the editing and publication of a collection of essays on this theme – Christian Mission and Social Transformation. In 1996, he published an article "African Churches in Social Transformation" in the Journal of International Affairs at Columbia University, New York. This article was followed by "Vision of African Church in Mission", published in Missionalia, Journal of the Southern African Missiological Society.

In 1998, he published "Missiological Research in the Context of Globalization", in Swedish Missiological Themes, Uppsala; "A Fresh Look at Evangelism in Africa" in International Review of Mission, Geneva; and "Christian Mission and Social Transformation After the Cold War" in the Journal of Constructive Theology, Pietermaritzburg, South Africa. At the request of Bishop John V. Taylor in 2001, Mūgambi wrote a critical Introduction published in the second edition of Taylor's book, The Primal Vision (SCM Press), also published in Nairobi as Christian Presence amid African Religion.

=== Eco-theology ===
During a conference organized by the World Council of Churches Sub-Unit of Church and Society in July 1986 at Potsdam, East Germany, Mūgambi presented a position paper titled "God, Humanity, and Nature in Ecumenical Discussion" cautioning against too sharp a distinction between these three notions in Christian doctrine. In 1987 he published his book God, Humanity and Nature in Relation to Justice and Peace, intended as a contribution to discussions within the World Council of Churches concerning the relationship between religion and culture on the one hand, and God and Nature on the other. This publication was an echo of a public forum that Mugambi had organized as an undergraduate at the University of Nairobi in 1972, with Professor Stephen Neill as Patron, on the theme "Creation or Evolution: God or Darwin". The theme of ecology became one of his research interests, and in 2001 he facilitated the editing and publication of Christian Theology and Environmental Responsibility. Mūgambi's contribution in that book was a chapter highly critical of carbon dioxide emissions trading, which was being pushed for adoption within the Kyoto Protocol under the United Nations Framework Convention on Climate Change (UNFCCC).

In 1997, he published his reflections on "Some Lessons from a Century of Ecumenism in Africa." In 2004 he co-authored a reference book with Gaim Kebreab titled Fresh Water to Eradicate Poverty, released in Oslo by Norwegian Church Aid. The Twelfth UNFCCC Conference of Parties was convened in Nairobi, Kenya, in December 2006: Mugambi served as honorary Moderator of the Ecumenical Team as a member of the WCC Delegation, where he read the WCC Statement at COP 12 in Nairobi.

In 2008, Mūgambi participated in an ecumenical Consultation to discuss the theme "Peace on Earth and Peace with the Earth". He presented a paper titled "The Environmental Crisis from an African Perspective." He also published an article titled "The Environmental Crisis from a Christian Perspective."

Mūgambi is a trustee of the Kenya Rainwater Association and the Utooni Development organization. He is also a member of the Ecumenical Water Network and the World Council of Churches Working Group on Climate Change.

=== Inter-religious dialogue ===
Mūgambi suggests that inter-religious dialogue has broader implications than arguments about beliefs and practices within and between religions. Believers of particular religions, denominations, and sects are at the same time citizens of particular nations. Thus, religious identity and secular identity are a practical necessity, irrespective of idealistic and utopian expectations. In his view, inter-religious dialogue can be one of the means to promote mutual understanding within and between religions, cultures, and nations, provided that such dialogue presupposes mutual respect and mutual reciprocity as should be.

=== Liberation theology ===
Mūgambi started schooling as an Internally Displaced Person (IDP). The experience was traumatic, as described by Caroline Elkins, David Anderson, and others. His articulation of Liberation Theology in later years was anchored in his personal experience of "imperial domination and colonial oppression". In 1989, he published a book containing his theological reflections African Christian Theology: An Introduction.

In his 1974 essay on liberation and salvation, Mūgambi clarified that within the African context of the 1960s and 1970s, national liberation was the main preoccupation for all responsible leaders.

That the fundamental concern of African Christian theology has been liberation-salvation has been manifested in the activities of many African Christians and the growth of more than six thousand "Independent" churches in the continent of Africa. Most African Christians have not felt it necessary to theorize about Christian Theology, as religious faith is practical living for them, expressed most effectively through experience, not through words. The time has come when it is necessary to analyze the premises of the African Christian experience and study it in relation to that of people in other parts of the world. This systematic analysis and study, however, will be realistic and relevant to African Christian theology if Africans themselves will be the analysts and students of their own experience. The most important point in this context is that while liberation both as a concept and as a historical struggle in Africa today takes on different emphasis in different parts of Africa, it must be the overarching goal – the historical project— out of which and for which an African Christian theology must emerge.

=== Reconstruction theology ===
In Mūgambi's scholarly work, liberation precedes reconstruction in African Christian Theological reflection.

Mūgambi resonates with Karl Jaspers' positive appraisal of myth in the conceptualization of world-views. Thus, Mūgambi proposes that "a society which is incapable of making its own myths and re-interpreting its old ones, becomes extinct". In view of this insight, he defines the vision of the theology of reconstruction, in Africa, as a project of "...re-mythologization, in which the theologian thus engaged, discerns new symbols and new metaphors in which to recast the central Message of the Gospel."

Mūgambi joins other scholars in African Christian theology, endeavoring to relate Christianity with the African cultural and religious heritage with an appreciation of both the Gospel and the wisdom bequeathed from generation to generation through oral tradition, cherished customs, rituals, and symbols. Mūgambi 's idea for a Pan-African identity has support within some diplomatic circles. Even though he does not treat Africa as a single geo-cultural context of theology, he nevertheless creates in his readers an impression that African concerns are broadly the same. He is particularly appealing because he strictly and consistently avoids any attempt at parochial, national, and regional introversion, opting for an approach that keeps in full view the entire continent of Africa with all its homogeneity and heterogeneity.

In his books, Mūgambi avoids such particularistic titles as "South African Christianity," "Kenyan Christianity", "Africa North (or South) of Limpopo", "East African Christianity", etc. Rather, he is concerned with the whole continent of Africans – both in the African continent and in the Diaspora. While Mūgambi acknowledges that theological articulation is strictly contextual and situational, all his works take "Africa" as the "Context" rather than individual countries which exist today most of which were created without regard for culture and people groups during the scramble for Africa.

Mūgambi's book From Liberation to Reconstruction assesses events that affected Africa as a whole. These events include the end of the Cold War (1989). Other events include the release of Nelson Mandela on 11 February 1990. For Mūgambi, Mandela is not only the longest-serving political prisoner; he is also the most prominent symbol of the Exodus metaphor in African Christian Theology.

=== From a theology of liberation to a theology of reconstruction ===
In his post-Cold-War theological discourses, which can also be regarded as his post-liberation works, Mūgambi suggests that the Africa of the 21st century will have to preoccupy itself with the agenda of the reconstruction as the new priority for Africa. The text of Ezra-Nehemiah, unlike that of Exodus, would be the main text in African theological discourses in the 21st century. Mūgambi believes this text will motivate the people of Africa to "rebuild their continent" and that the churches and their theologians will need to respond to this new priority in relevant fashion, to facilitate this process of reconstruction. He believes this process will require considerable effort in reconciliation and confidence-building. It will also require re-orientation and retraining.

While acknowledging that Mūgambi has "correctly observed that an epiphany of a new scenario has emerged, ushered in by the demise of three horrendous systems of oppression; namely institutionalized racism, brutal colonialism and the cold war tutelage", Ukachukwu Chris Manus considers Mūgambi as having failed to recognize the central figure in the New Testament, Jesus of Nazareth as the Master Reconstructor of both the spiritual and the social well-being of the bnaiya Israel, the simple folk of his day in first century Palestine."

Manus goes on to argue that the term "reconstruction" makes a deep impression on him as a "meta-language" that challenges African religiosity to discern and promote new insights that can inspire a new movement that would help to galvanize Africans in the continent like those in the Diaspora to struggle and regain their integrity. For Manus, therefore, the goal of reconstruction ought to be pursued in order to re-capture Africa's self-esteem, dignity, and integrity, "in the context of new Information and Communication Technology."

Others have offered perspectives on Mūgambi's views on liberation and reconstruction. In attempting a definition, Hannah Wangeci Kinoti explained that the idea of reconstruction assumes that there is a framework that was previously there. She went on to say that "a cluster of words associated with the verb reconstruct should quicken our vision of asking the Church in Africa to rise up and do more, purposefully and decisively." She suggested that the concept of reconstruction implies a process of "review and then move" – to create something more suitable to the prevailing environment. Other terms can be invoked: rebuild, reassemble, re-establish, recreate, reform, renovate, regenerate, remake, remodel, restore, or re-organize.

== Main works ==
- 2003 Christian Theology and Social Reconstruction, Nairobi: Acton
- 2002 Christianity and African Culture, Nairobi: Acton. (New edition of African Heritage and Contemporary Christianity).
- 1996 Religion and Social Construction of Reality, Nairobi University Press
- 1995 From Liberation to Reconstruction: African Christian Theology after the Cold War, Nairobi: East African Educational Publishers
- 1992 Critiques of Christianity in African Literature, Nairobi: Heinemann
- 1989 African Heritage and Contemporary Christianity, Nairobi: Longman
- 1989 The Biblical Basis for Evangelization: Theological Reflections Based on an African Experience (Nairobi: Oxford University Press,
- 1989 African Christian Theology: An Introduction (Nairobi: Heinemann,
- 1988 Philosophy of Religion: A Text Book, University of Nairobi
- 1987 God, Humanity and Nature in Relation to Justice and Peace, Geneva: WCC.
- 1974 Carry it Home, Nairobi: EA Literature Bureau (Poetry).

A festschrift for Mugambi was published in 2012:

- 2012 Theologies of Liberation and Reconstruction: Essays in Honour of Professor Jesse N.K. Mugambi, edited by Isaac T. Mwase and Eunice K. Kamaara, Nairobi: Acton.

== See also ==
- Political theology in Sub-Saharan Africa

== Works cited ==
- Ukachukwu, Chris Manus (2003). Intercultural Hermeneutics in Africa. Nairobi: Acton.
