= Jesuit School of Theology =

Jesuit School of Theology may refer to Jesuit theology in general, or to a specific theological college or faculty run by the order, including:

- Weston Jesuit School of Theology, Boston College, USA
- Jesuit School of Theology of Santa Clara University
