= Isabel Apawo Phiri =

Malawian theologian

- Born: 8 November 1957; Zambia
- Citizenship: Malawi
- Occupation: Theologian
- Known for: advocate for gender and social justice.

Academic background
- Education: University of Malawi, University of Lancaster
- Alma mater: University of Cape Town
- Thesis: Women, Presbyterianism and Patriarchy: Religious Experience of Chewa Women in Malawi (1997)

Academic work
- Institutions: World Council of Churches University of KwaZulu-Natal
- Main interests: African theology Gender studies HIV/AIDS
- Website: https://www.oikoumene.org/news/isabel-apawo-phiri-joins-wcc-as-new-associate-general-secretary

Isabel Apawo Phiri (1957 - ) is a Malawian theologian known for her work in gender justice, HIV/AIDS and African theology. She is a Professor of African Theology and Dean of the School of Religion, Philosophy and Classics at the University of KwaZulu-Natal. She has been a Deputy Secretary for the World Council of Churches since 2012. She was moderator of the World Council of Churches' Commission on Education and Ecumenical Formation, and Associate General Secretary for Public Witness and Diakonia by the World Council of Churches. She was the founder of the Circle of Concerned African Women Theologians in Malawi. Phiri is an author, journal editor, theologian and advocate for gender and social justice.

== Early life and education ==
Phiri, a Chewa person, was born in Zambia on 8 November 1957 and her family returned to Malawi when she was six months old. She was brought up in the Church of Central Africa Presbyterian. She has a bachelor's degree in Education from the University of Malawi, a Master's in Religious Education from the University of Lancaster in England and a PhD from the University of Cape Town in South Africa. It was in South Africa that she was first exposed to feminist theology and liberation theology. Her doctoral thesis looked at the religious experience of Chewa women in Malawi. It was re-worked into her first book, which was the first book published by a Malawian woman theologian.

== Personal life ==
Phiri lives in Geneva, where she is an elder in the Church of Scotland. She is married to Maxwell Agabu Phiri, a professor in marketing. They co-authored a 2017 paper entitled "HIV and AIDS, Gender Violence and Masculinities: A Case of South Africa" which examined a curriculum used by church going couples, finding there had been an increase in communication about sexuality and a decrease in gender based violence, but confirming a need to re-examine the theology of marriage in African churches. They have three children.

== Career ==
Phiri is a teacher by profession. She is regarded as one "mother" of the Circle of Concerned African Women Theologians in Malawi. She participated in the convocation of the Circle in 1989 and established the Circle in Malawi in 1993, with its first conference held at her home in Chirunga in 1994. She joined with three other women academics at the University of Malawi to research and write on women's issues. In 1995, she presented their research findings on sexual harassment and rape on campus at the university and was the victim of violent attacks from students and staff in response, for speaking about such a taboo topic. Her house was stoned and her office damaged. She was later threatened with excommunication from the Blantyre Synod of the Presbyterian Church of Central Africa for "inciting church women to seek gender justice." Due to these incidents, Phiri left Malawi for Namibia in 1996. Phiri was also involved in promoting the ordination of women in the Blantyre Synod, marching against the Synod's policy of barring women from ordination in 1995.

Phiri was a lecturer in the Department of Theology and Religious Studies at Chancellor College of the University of Malawi, before becoming Professor of African Theology and Dean of the School of Religion, Philosophy and Classics at the University of KwaZulu-Natal in Pietermaritzburg. She has also taught at Zomba Theological College and served as editor of the Journal of Gender and Religion in Africa. From 2002 until 2007 she was the general coordinator of the Circle of Concerned African Women Theologians. Phiri organised the Malawi chapter of the Circle of Concerned African Women Theologians at Chancellor College, where its launch drew about fifty participants and she mentored a group of Malawian members including Gertrude Kapuma, Fulata Lusungu Moyo, Rachel NyaGondwe Fiedler and Molly Longwe. She was succeeded as coordinator by Moyo in 1996 and by Fiedler in 2003. She also served as moderator of the World Council of Churches' Commission on Education and Ecumenical Formation.

Phiri's research interests are in African theology, feminist theology and HIV/AIDS. She was a theological advisor for the Africa Bible Commentary, and wrote the articles on Ruth, Rape, The Bible and Polygamy, and Weddings and Lobola.

In August 2012, Phiri was appointed Associate General Secretary for Public Witness and Diakonia by the World Council of Churches. Her role focuses on issues including racism, sexuality, climate change and justice. In 2017, she presented the "Fez Plan of Action" (Plan of Action for Religious Leaders and Actors to Prevent Incitement to Violence that Could Lead to Atrocity Crimes) to the United Nations in New York, saying that more women are needed in church leadership roles to prevent future atrocity crimes.

In December 2017, Phiri was detained by Israeli authorities at Ben Gurion Airport for eight hours and refused entry to Israel for an ecumenical meeting in Jerusalem. The reason given at the time was "Prevention of illegal immigration considerations", although it was later said it was because the WCC supported Boycott, Divestment and Sanctions against Israel, although Phiri was the only one of four WCC officials refused entry. Olav Fykse Tveit, General Secretary of The World Council of Churches, released a statement calling it an "unprecedented move" and saying "The WCC deeply regrets the Israeli antagonism against the WCC's initiatives for peace with justice for both Palestinians and Israelis." In October 2018, a Jerusalem administrative appeals court invalidated the state's decision to bar Phiri entry.

In 2018, Phiri was featured in an exhibition called "Faith in Gender Justice" at the Scottish Parliament, with a photograph and her quote: "Prophetic theology has turned me into an advocate for gender justice." She has called on Christian clergy to denounce violence against women as a sin. In 2020 and 2021, Phiri has been involved in the WCC's publications on responding to the health and economic impacts of the COVID-19 pandemic and advocacy for vaccine equity.

== Awards and honours ==
- 1995: "Woman of the Year", Nation Newspaper for bringing gender justice into public debate in Malawi
- 1998: Honorable mention, Noma Award for Publishing in Africa for Women, Presbyterianism and Patriarchy

== Selected publications ==
=== Books ===
- Apawo Phiri, Isabel (1994). Christianity and African Women: Liberation Or Oppression?. Chancellor College.
- Apawo Phiri, Isabel (2000). Women, Presbyterianism and Patriarchy:Religious Experience of Chewa Women in Central Malawi. CLAIM. ISBN 9783926105790.
- Apawo Phiri, Isabel; Govinden, Devarakshanam Betty; Nadar, Sarojini (2002). Her-stories: hidden histories of women of faith in Africa. Cluster. ISBN 9781875053339.
- Apawo Phiri, Isabel; Haddad, Bev; Masenya, Madipoane Joyce (2003). African Women, HIV/AIDS, and Faith Communities. Cluster Publications. ISBN 9781875053421.
- Apawo Phiri, Isabel; Nadar, Sarojini (2012). African Women, Religion and Health: Essays in Honour of Mercy Amba Ewudziwa Oduyoye. Wipf and Stock. ISBN 9781620320921.
- Apawo Phiri, Isabel; Werner, Dietrich; Djomhoué, Priscille; Amanze, James (2013). Handbook of Theological Education in Africa. Regnum Books International. ISBN 9781908355195.
- Apawo Phiri, Isabel; Werner, Dietrich; Kaunda, Chammah J.; Owino, Kennedy (2016). Anthology of African Christianity. 1517 Media. ISBN 9781506474922.

=== Journal articles ===
- Apawo Phiri, Isabel (1997). "Doing Theology In Community: The case of African women theologians in the 1990s". Journal of Theology for Southern Africa. 99: 68–76.
- Apawo Phiri, Isabel (2002). ""Why does God allow our husbands to hurt us?" Overcoming violence against women". Journal of Theology for Southern Africa. 114: 19–30.
- Apawo Phiri, Isabel (2002). "Life in fullness: gender justice: a perspective from Africa". Journal of Constructive Theology. 8 (2): 71–84.
- Apawo Phiri, Isabel (2003). "President Frederick J.T. Chiluba of Zambia: The Christian Nation and Democracy". Journal of Religion in Africa. 33 (4): 401–428. doi:10.1163/157006603322665332.
- Apawo Phiri, Isabel (2004). "HIV/AIDS: An African Theological Response in Mission". The Ecumenical Review. 56 (4): 422–431. doi:10.1111/j.1758-6623.2004.tb00528.x.
- Apawo Phiri, Isabel (2004). "A Theological Analysis of the Voices of Teenage Girls on 'Men's Role in the Fight Against HIV/AIDS' in KwaZulu-Natal, South Africa". Journal of Theology for Southern Africa. 120: 34–45.
- Phiri, Isabel (2004). "African women's theologies in the new millennium". Agenda: Empowering Women for Gender Equity. 18 (61): 16–24. doi:10.1080/10130950.2004.9676034. S2CID 142650519.
- Apawo Phiri, Isabel; Nadar, Sarojini (2006). "What's in a Name? Forging a Theoretical Framework for African Women's Theologies". Journal of Constructive Theology. 12 (2): 5–24.
- Apawo Phiri, Isabel (2009). "Major Challenges for African Women Theologians in Theological Education (1989-2008)". International Review of Mission. 98 (1): 105–119. doi:10.1111/j.1758-6631.2009.00009.x. hdl:10500/4525.
- Apawo Phiri, Isabel; Nadar, Sarojini (2009). ""Going Through the Fire with Eyes Wide Open":African Women's Perspectives on indigenous Knowledge, Patriarchy and Sexuality". The Study of Religion in Southern Africa. 22 (2): 5–21. JSTOR 24764316.
- Apawo Phiri, Isabel; Nadar, Sarojini (2011). ""The personal is political" : faith and religion in a public university". Acta Theologica. sup-4: 81–94.
- Nadar, Sarojini; Phiri, Isabel (2012). "Charting the Paradigm Shifts in HIV Research: The Contribution of Gender and Religion Studies". Journal of Feminist Studies in Religion. 28 (2): 121–129. doi:10.2979/jfemistudreli.28.2.121. S2CID 144142146.
- Apawo Phiri, Isabel; Phiri, Maxwell Agabu (2017). "HIV and AIDS, Gender Violence and Masculinities: A Case of South Africa". Journal of Human Ecology. 53 (1): 74–86. doi:10.1080/09709274.2016.11906958. S2CID 158391037.
- Apawo Phiri, Isabel (2020). "Reaching the Champions of Social Justice: Blind Spots in the Ecumenical Racial and Gender Response". The Ecumenical Review. 72 (1): 62–72. doi:10.1111/erev.12492. S2CID 213335603.
