= Political theology in sub-Saharan Africa =

Political theology in sub-Saharan Africa deals with the relationship of theology and politics born from and/or specific to the circumstances of the region. Arising from the anti-apartheid struggle in South Africa and nationalist campaigns of the mid- to late twentieth century elsewhere, the increasing numbers of Christians in sub-Saharan Africa has led to an increased interest in Christian responses to the region's continuing issues of poverty, violence, and war. According to the Cameroonian theologian and sociologist Jean-Marc Éla, African Christianity "has to be formulated from the struggles of our people, from their joys, from their pains, from their hopes and from their frustrations today." African theology is heavily influenced by liberation theology, global black theology, and postcolonial theology.

== Hermeneutics ==
Much of African political theology owes to distinctively African readings of the Bible. African theologians interpret the Bible through the lens the African experience, oppression and poverty being frequent themes.

Itumeleng Mosala argues that the Bible itself must be understood as having arisen from the ideology of its compilers and that an uncritical acceptance of the Bible as the word of God leads to a notion that it has no ideology itself. Mosala says that this idea is wrong and that the Bible's compilation makes it inherently ideological, reflecting that of its compilers, and that the ideology it presents is harmful to colonized peoples. Mosala, like several others, also includes Marxist elements in his reading of the Bible.

The Tswana theologian Musa Dube employs a "decolonizing feminist biblical practice" she calls "Rahab's reading prism." Named for the prostitute who protected Israelite spies who came to investigate Jericho before it was besieged by the Israelite army. Dube says her prism highlights "the historical fact of colonizing and decolonizing communities inhabiting the feminist space of liberation practice." She argues for a new reading of the Bible by colonized peoples in order to create new narratives that speak of equity and freedom. For her, the interests of the decolonizing project are a part of the feminist agenda.

For some, the biblical text may be disregarded in favour of perceived direction from the Holy Spirit.

== Themes ==
Arising out of the distinctive African hermeneutic, several themes are common among African theologians as concerns for a Christian response in the public sphere.

=== Christology ===
Jesse N. K. Mugambi and Laurenti Magesa have written that "theology is not Christian at all when it does not offer Jesus Christ of Nazareth as the answer to the human quest", including politics. For many African theologians, Jesus is seen as a liberating figure, including liberation from inequality, oppression, and poverty in opposition to what Jean-Marc Éla identifies as a "Babylonian captivity" of Christianity to Greco-Latin philosophies and Christologies that do not relate to the African experience. Among these are the image of an "imperial" Christ used to justify oppression and a "slave-trader" Christ used to promote faith in a distant salvation rather than earthly liberation. Éla's use of the terms "imperial" and "slave-holder" in reference to Jesus are not literal but serve to show the effects of traditional readings which serve to keep subjugated peoples from attempting to free themselves out of a belief that a distant salvation will come.

=== Equality ===
Having been subjected and treated as less than human, African theologians seek to validate their humanity on par with that of others. For example, Ananias Mpunzi writes that "we have the task both of affirming the humanity of others and helping them to affirm it for themselves."

=== Church and state ===
Though religious leaders like South Africa's Desmond Tutu play important roles in several African states as public commentators on moral issues, only Zambia has declared itself to be officially a Christian nation. The Ugandan Catholic priest Emmanuel Katongole has written that the Christian gospel is deeply political and that the most urgent task for Christianity is to make politics work better, become more democratic and transparent, thus promoting stability and encouraging development. Éla calls on the church to be the link between revelation and history, or to push for political change, shaping the world of today rather than waiting for an otherworldly salvation.

=== Reconciliation ===
After decades of colonial rule and mismanagement by postcolonial governments, many Africans became embittered. According to Emmanuel Katongole, Christianity must engage with that past in order to move forward. Opinions on how that is to be done vary. Katongole sees the way forward in overcoming tribal divisions, forgiveness, and working together, something he sees Christianity uniquely capable of doing. Willa Boesek, on the other hand, writing shortly after the end of South African apartheid encouraged a righteous anger that could lead to change but differentiated it from hate-filled rage. He admonished victims to control their anger, urging them to not indict all white people for the oppression. At the same time, he urged white South African churches to help their members overcome their fear of blacks and to not expect immediate reconciliation. Bitterness, anger, and aggression were natural consequences of the situation in South Africa, he believed, "a kind of unnatural 'Christian' patience and reasonableness vis-à-vis this history is not Christian at all, but a distorted ethos of submissiveness forced upon oppressed people". Others, like Desmond Tutu in his Ubuntu theology, press for a peaceful reconciliation.

=== Land, resources, and poverty ===
Under colonialism, Africa's land and resources were expropriated by white settlers and colonial agents, leaving the indigenous inhabitants with little of the continent's wealth. The issue of land restoration and redistribution are common topics for African theologians in the postcolonial era. An oft-repeated refrain from the missionary enterprise is that white people came to Africa with the Bible and the people had the land. The white missionaries taught the people to pray and when they opened their eyes, the Africans had the Bible and the whites had the land. Boesak encouraged white churches in South Africa to examine their role in the historical appropriation of black land. Itumeleng Mosala addresses land and poverty in his reading of the Book of Micah, emphasizing the sin of Israel in neglecting the poor.

== Criticisms ==
As a contextual theology, African political theology lacks universality. It has been criticized it for being provisional, tentative, halting, and imprecise. M. Shawn Copeland points out an insufficiently rigorous analysis of imperialism, capitalism, and democracy. She identifies gaps in the discussions within African theology, specifically noting that a lack of theological critique in Zimbabwe and Nigeria "mock the rhetoric of black theology as public theology and further distort the church's ministerial praxis."
