= Reconciliation theology in Northern Ireland =

Reconciliation theology in Northern Ireland is a contextual process and a divine goal which involves working to create freedom and peace in Northern Ireland. As with reconciliation theology more widely, reconciliation theology in Northern Ireland emphasises the concepts of truth, justice, forgiveness, and repentance. A theology of reconciliation is practically applied by reconciliation communities.

The discourse on reconciliation emerged in Northern Ireland during the 1990s with the beginnings of the peace process after the Troubles. It began with local academics and theologians but was picked up as an idea by politicians, policy makers, and religious leaders, who each understood it in differing ways and emphasised it for different reasons.

== Reconciliation communities ==
In Northern Ireland, reconciliation communities are ecumenical groups, separate from the institutional church, which are committed to active social justice and a practical theology of reconciliation. They were founded before, during and after the Troubles to promote a model of Christian reconciliation and living and offer a guide for a practical national reconciliation. There are similarities and differences between these communities in terms of structure, development, size, location, visions, and aims.

The first and largest of these groups is Corrymeela which was founded in 1965 and works to help people "to live and work well together", by bringing people of different backgrounds, different political and religious beliefs and different identities together.

Other reconciliation communities include:

- The Christian Renewal Centre (County Down, 1974)
- The Lamb of God Community (North Belfast, 1977)
- The Columba Community (Derry, 1981)
- The Cornerstone Community (West Belfast, 1982)
- The Columbanus Community of Reconciliation (North Belfast, 1983)
- The Currach Community (West Belfast, 1992)

== Political use of the term reconciliation ==
During the peace process, the term reconciliation was used by politicians who adopted a similar usage to that of the reconciliation communities. The Belfast Agreement (1998) demonstrated a political concern for reconciliation, with the term being used eight times in the agreement. In the Declaration of Support, the participants dedicated themselves to "the achievement of reconciliation" and stated that they would "endeavour to strive in every practical way towards reconciliation and rapprochement within the framework of democratic and agreed arrangements." In a section of the agreement on "Reconciliation and Victims of Violence", the participants pledged their support for the existing reconciliation communities:

The participants recognise and value the work being done by many organisations to develop reconciliation and mutual understanding and respect between and within communities and traditions, in Northern Ireland and between North and South, and they see such work as having a vital role in consolidating peace and political agreement. Accordingly, they pledge their continuing support to such organisations and will positively examine the case for enhanced financial assistance for the work of reconciliation.

The understanding of reconciliation evolved with the peace process. The term was used by the Democratic Unionist Party and Sinn Féin in their negotiations with regard to a desire for political stability and community building. It has since been used to suggest co-existence.

In the Sinn Féin MLA Declan Kearney's "Reconciliation Speech" in 2012, "reconciliation and trust" were proposed as the next stages of the peace process.

== Problems with the term reconciliation ==
The different understandings and uses of the term reconciliation in Northern Ireland have resulted in confusion among the communities. It has been acknowledged that reconciliation and the discourse surrounding it is very fluid and indistinct in Northern Ireland. The political understanding of reconciliation has caused distrust of the term and a "theological backlash" with regard to reconciliation in Northern Ireland.

Cecelia Clegg and Joseph Liechty have identified that the:

concept of reconciliation is criticized from at least two main angles: some politically-oriented critics see reconciliation as a weak-minded, establishmentarian alternative to the real task of justice and structural change, while its conservative religious critics condemn reconciliation as a matter of crying peace where there is no peace.

Interviews with those working in interfaith communities have revealed a disassociation with the term by community workers, and a resentment toward funding bodies who appear to be interested only in projects including the words "reconciliation" and "peace". A leader of Corrymeela, David Stevens, has said that the concept of reconciliation has "seemingly lost its meaning" due to the historic failures to bring the two groups together.
