= Enamengal =

Enamengal Enamenga; Enam-Ngal
- Location within Cameroon
- Coordinates: 3°19′N 12°01′E
- Country: Cameroon
- Region: South Region
- Department: Dja-et-Lobo
- Municipality: Zoétélé
- Elevation: 581 m (1,906 ft)

Population (2005)
  - Total: 151
- Time zone: UTC+1 (WAT)

Enamengal, also known as Enamenga or Enam-Ngal, is a village in Cameroon. It is located within the municipality of Zoétélé of the Dja-et-Lobo department, South Region. It had a population of 151 in 2005.

== Demographics ==
In 1962, when it was part of French Cameroun, it had a population of 92, mostly members of the Fong ethnic group.

In the 2005 Cameroon Census, there were 151 people living in Enamengal.

== Notable people ==
The Jesuit theologian and artist Engelbert Mveng was born in Enamengal.

== See also ==
- Communes of Cameroon
