= Kwame Bediako =

Ghanaian Christian theologian

- Born: July 7, 1945; Akropong, Ghana
- Died: June 10, 2008 (aged 62)
- Occupations: Theologian and scholar of Christianity in Africa
- Known for: African Christian theology
- Spouse: Gillian Mary

Academic background
- Education: University of Bordeaux; University of Aberdeen
- Doctoral advisor: Andrew Walls

Academic work
- Discipline: Theology; Christianity in Africa
- Institutions: Akrofi-Christaller Institute

Kwame Bediako (July 7, 1945 – June 10, 2008), also known as Manasseh Kwame Dakwa Bediako, was a Ghanaian Christian theologian and Rector for the Akrofi-Christaller Institute for Theology, Mission and Culture in Akropong, Akuapim North, Ghana.

== Biography ==
Bediako was born in Akropong, Ghana and, as the son of a police inspector, grew up in a Police Training Depot in Accra. Due to this upbringing, he learned and spoke his mother tongue of Twi and the Accra language Ga.

Bediako was raised in a Christian home, the grandson of a Presbyterian catechist and evangelist, and received his secondary education in the Mfantsi-pim School, Cape Coast, originally founded as part of a British Methodist mission. However, he later became an atheist through French existentialist influences and pursue a masters and doctoral degrees in the University of Bordeaux on African francophone literature. Yet during his time in France, he experienced a radical conversion event back to Christianity. In 1973, he completed his doctorate in Bordeaux, he married fellow student of French, from England, Gillian Mary, and the Bediakos both commenced theological studiesat the London Bible College (now the London School of Theology). Bediako later moved to the Department of Religious Studies at the University of Aberdeen, to study under Andrew Walls for his second doctorate, from 1978 to 1983.

In 1987, Bediako became the first rector of the Akrofi-Christaller Institute for Theology, Mission and Culture, a university dedicated to the study and the documentation of Christian history, thought, and life in Ghana and, more broadly, in Africa. An endowment fund has been established in the Institute under his name.

Kwame Bediako died on June 10, 2008, following a serious illness.

== Theology ==
In his latter life, Bediako was known primarily for his works in African Christian theology.

His PhD at Aberdeen was later published in 1999, which explored the influence of indigenous cultures on Christianity in the second century Greco-Roman world and in 20th century Africa. His other works have tended to emphasize questions related to the encounter between Christianity and an indigenous religious context, especially as found in Africa.

Furthermore, mindful of his linguistic background, Bediako was an advocate for the role of vernacular language on the development of Christian theology.

== Works ==
- Bediako, Kwame (1999). Theology and Identity: The Impact of Culture Upon Christian Thought in the Second Century and in Modern Africa. Oxford: OCMS. ISBN 978-1-870345-10-1.
- Bediako, Kwame (1995). Christianity in Africa: The Renewal of a Non-Western Religion. Edinburgh: Edinburgh University Press. ISBN 978-0-7486-0625-2.
- Bediako, Kwame (2000). Jesus and the Gospel in Africa: History and Experience. Maryknoll, NY: Orbis Books. ISBN 978-1-57075-542-2.
