= Emmanuel Katongole (theologian) =

Ugandan Catholic priest and theologian

The Reverend Emmanuel Katongole
- Born: November 27, 1960 (age 65); Malube, Uganda
- Education: Catholic University of Louvain
- Occupation: Theologian
- Theological work
- Main interests: Reconciliation theology, Political theology

Emmanuel Katongole (born 27 November 1960) is a Ugandan Catholic priest and theologian known for his work on violence and politics in Africa and theology of reconciliation.

== Biography ==
Katongole was born in Malube, Uganda, to Anthony Bukerimanza and Magdalene Nyiraruhango. His father, a Tutsi, and his mother, a Hutu, were both originally from Rwanda but moved to Uganda in the 1950s.

Intent on going into the priesthood, Katongole began studies in 1980 in philosophy at Katigondo National Major Seminary, followed by theology at Gaba National Seminary. After his seminary education, he was ordained into the priesthood in June 1987. He later pursued further studies at the Catholic University of Louvain, ultimately completing a PhD in philosophy in 1996.

After teaching for a number of years in Uganda and South Africa, Katongole joined the faculty of Duke Divinity School where he taught theology and world Christianity (2001–2012) and co-founded the Center for Reconciliation. Katongole has been at the University of Notre Dame's Kroc Institute for International Peace Studies since January 2013, and is now a full professor of theology and peace studies.

In February 2017, Katongole delivered the Henry Martyn Lectures at Cambridge University, entitled "Who Are My People? Christianity, Violence, and Belonging in Post-Colonial Africa."

In 2017, Katongole was named by the Henry Luce Foundation as a Henry Luce III Fellow in Theology for 2017–2018.

== Works ==
- Katongole, Emmanuel (2005). A Future for Africa: Critical Essays in Christian Social Imagination. Scranton: University of Scranton Press. ISBN 978-1-5326-3181-8.
- Katongole, Emmanuel; Rice, Chris (2008). Reconciling All Things: A Christian Vision for Justice, Peace and Healing. Downers Grove, IL: InterVarsity Press. ISBN 978-0-8308-3451-8.
- ——— (2009). Mirror to the Church: Resurrecting Faith After Genocide in Rwanda. Jonathan Wilson-Hartgrove. Downers Grove, IL: Zondervan. ISBN 978-0-310-28489-5.
- ——— (2011). The Sacrifice of Africa: A Political Theology for Africa. Grand Rapids, MI: Eerdmans. ISBN 978-0-8028-6268-6.
- ——— (2017). Born from Lament: On the Theology and Politics of Hope in Africa. Grand Rapids, MI: Eerdmans. ISBN 978-0-8028-7434-4.
- ——— (2017). The Journey of Reconciliation: Groaning for a New Creation in Africa. Maryknoll, NY: Orbis Books. ISBN 978-1-60833-715-6.

== See also ==
- Catholic Church in Uganda
- Political theology in sub-Saharan Africa
- Reconciliation theology
