= Elisabeth Gerle =

Swedish philosopher and theologian (born 1951)

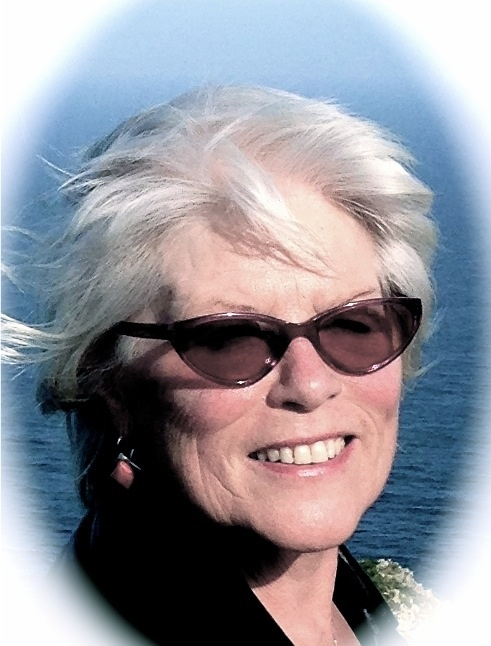
Elisabeth Gerle, 2013

Elisabeth Gerle (born 8 December 1951) is a Swedish philosopher and theologian. She is Professor of Ethics with a special focus on human rights at Uppsala University and ethicist at the Research Department, Church of Sweden. She has worked at Uppsala University] Lund University, Malmö University and has been a visiting scholar at Princeton University, where she gained her doctorate, and at the Stellenbosch University of Advanced Studies.

== Life ==
Gerle is an ordained Lutheran cleric. She earned her doctorate in ethics from Princeton. She is professor of ethics with a special focus on human rights at Uppsala University and ethicist at the Research Department, Church of Sweden. She has spent several years at Princeton University as a visiting scholar, first at The Center of International Relations and then at Princeton Theological Seminary. Since she returned to Sweden in 1995 she has lived in Lund and worked as senior ethicist and associate professor and lecturer at Lund and Malmö University in Ethics and Human Rights. During 2001–2005 she was dean of the Pastoral Institute in Lund. Her Lund office is situated at the Raoul Wallenberg Institute. She is professor of ethics at Lund University, in the Centre for Theology and Religious Studies.

Since 2014 she is visiting scholar at the Stellenbosch University of Advanced Studies (STIAS), in South Africa, collaborating with Sarojini Nadar from UKZN.

In 2010 Gerle published a bookk, Farlig förenkling – Religion och politik utifrån Sverigedemokraterna och Humanisterna, on religion and politics in Sweden. She appears on Swedish Radio on the Filosofiska rummet (Philosophical room) programme.

She has written many articles in English, including two which feature in volumes designed to introduce Scandinavian Creation Theology to English speaking audiences. These are Reformation Theology for the Post-Secular Age (2017) and Bodies Inhabiting the World (2023). She was also joint editor for a similar work, American Perspectives on Scandinavian Creation Theology (2020). In 2017 her book Passionate Embrace: Luther on Love, the Body and Sensuality was published in English.
