= Reconciliation theology =

Theological approach to political conflict

Reconciliation theology or the theology of reconciliation raises crucial theological questions about how reconciliation can be brought into regions of political conflict. The term differs from the conventional theological understanding of reconciliation, but likewise emphasises themes of justice, truth, forgiveness and repentance.

== Overview ==
Reconciliation is conventionally understood as a central theological concept in Christianity: God reconciles himself with humanity through the atonement of Christ and, likewise, the followers of Christ are called to become peacemakers and reconcile with one another. The Greek term for reconciliation katallagē means to "exchange enmity, wrath and war with friendship, love and peace." A number of theologians have developed this theological concept, such as Irenaeus (115–202), Tertullian (160–220), Augustine of Hippo (324–430), Martin Luther (1483–1546), John Calvin (1509–64), Albrecht Ritschl (1822–89), Karl Barth (1886–1968), Dietrich Bonhoeffer (1906–45) and Gustavo Gutiérrez (1928).

However, the Christian concept of reconciliation has recently been applied to political conflict zones of the world by John W. de Gruchy, Robert Schreiter and others and called "reconciliation theology". De Gruchy demonstrates four interrelated ways of reconciliation:

- Reconciliation between God and humanity, and what it brings to mean in terms of social relations.
- Interpersonal ways of reconciliation between individuals.
- The meaning of reconciliation between alienated communities and groups at a local level.
- Political usage of reconciliation such as the process of national reconciliation.

The understating of reconciliation theology has raised crucial questions about how this concept of reconciliation can be applicable in each context. When it attaches to political discourse and goes uncriticised, it is sometimes seen as being greatly inappropriate and even dangerous. Thus, there is a strong emphasis on the historical and contextual considerations, and a 'reflection on what is happening on the ground' in the actual process of reconciliation.

De Gruchy notes that the issue of reconciliation needs to include the understanding of "covenant and creation, sin and guilt, grace and forgiveness, the reign of God's justice and human hope", all of which could have political significance. Joseph Liechty and Cecelia Clegg present in their study Moving Beyond Sectarianism that a true understanding of reconciliation has to deal with "the interlocking dynamics of forgiveness, repentance, truth, and justice."

== South African Truth and Reconciliation Commission ==
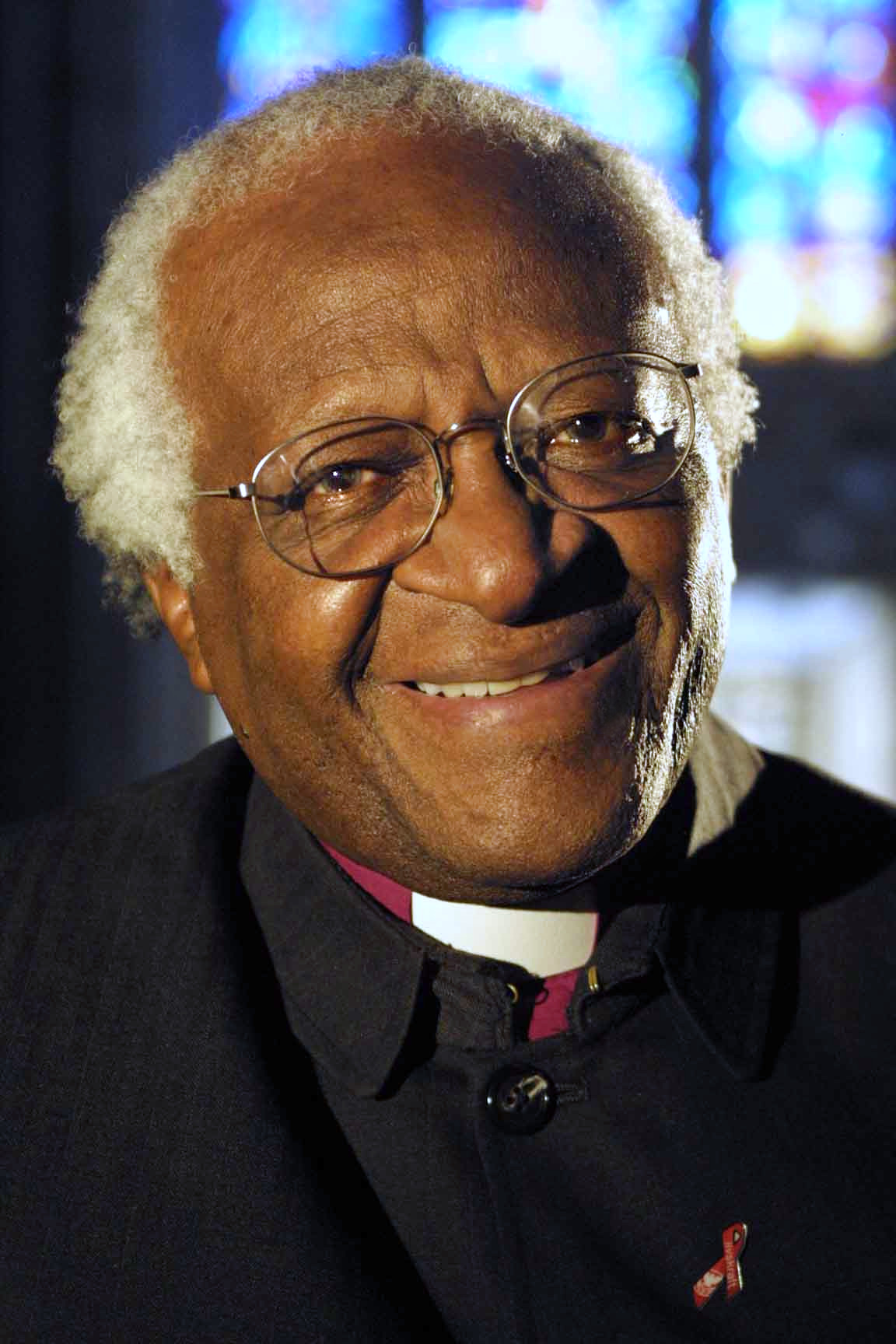
Archbishop Desmond Tutu, chair of the TRC

=== Brief background ===
One of the initial political acts in post-apartheid South Africa was the creation of the Truth and Reconciliation Commission (TRC), in order to establish and facilitate truth and reconciliation while acknowledging crimes committed and human rights violations during the apartheid era (1960–1994). It came as an outcome of negotiations between the contrasting political parties of Nelson Mandela (ANC) and F. W. de Klerk (NP).

As for its goal, De Gruchy explains, "TRC did contribute to that goal in becoming a catalyst for the healing of the past and enabling at least some people to experience forgiveness and reconciliation in the present."

Archbishop Desmond Tutu, the chairman of the TRC, demonstrates in No Future without Forgiveness the connection between telling the truth and social justice. The public storytelling for those cruelly silenced for so long, and remembering the cruelties of the past can restore an individual's human dignity and bring healing for the nation.

=== Criticism against the TRC ===
One criticism Joseph Liechty raises against the TRC is that "it lacked an emphasis on the concepts of justice and repentance", two out of the four concepts for the true reconciliation – namely, justice, truth, forgiveness and repentance. Therefore, the concepts of truth and atoning tendencies of the TRC downplays the justice element of liberation theology. Individuals with this view, such as the theologians behind the Kairos Document, desire to "promote truth and justice and life at all costs, even at the cost of creating conflict, disunity and dissension along the way."

== Korean Reunification ==
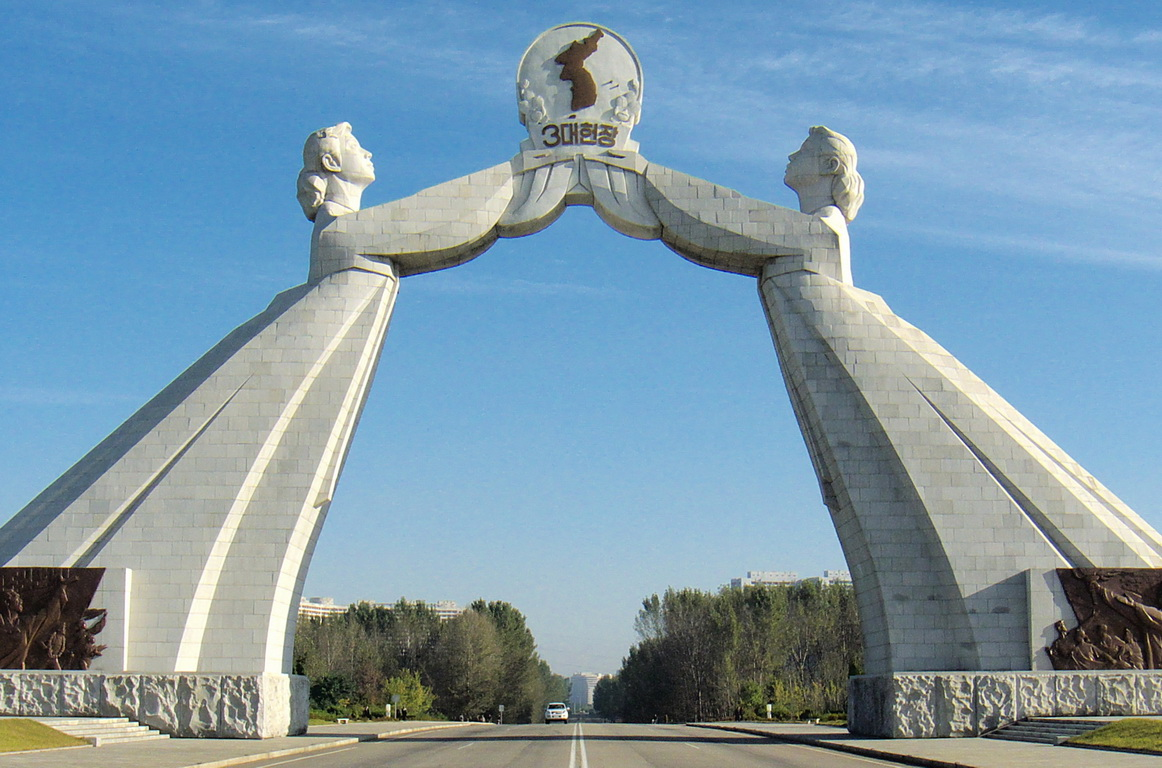
The Arch of Reunification 2001, symbol of June 15th North–South Joint Declaration, in the North Korean capital of Pyongyang

=== Brief background ===
The Korean War (1950–53) broke out not long after the Liberation of Korea in 1945 by the USA from the South and USSR from the North. During the war, at least a million Korean were killed, and more than a million were relocated and separated from their families. Since the war, the divided Koreas remain with bitter conflict against one other.

During the 1980s the Korean Christian Federation (North Korea) and the National Council of Churches in Korea (South Korea) began to initiate conversations related to the unification of their two governments, often with the assistance of the World Council of Churches. Due to these activities, in the late 1990s, the South Korean approach towards the North changed vividly when president Kim Dae-jung announced the 'Sunshine Policy' (Korean: 햇볕 정책). Kim Dae-Jung, a committed Catholic, professes his belief in the saving power of Jesus Christ in his personal life and testifies to his conviction of the ultimate triumph of justice.

The "Sunshine Policy" is the political act of reconciliation of South Korea (ROK) towards North Korea (DPRK), aimed at "achieving peace on the Korean Peninsula through reconciliation and cooperation" from 1998 to 2008. Sebastian Kim notes two important dimensions of the policy: "affirming the partnership of the nations rather than the merging of the North into the South along the lines of German reunification, and insisting that initiatives on the issue be taken by North and South Korea themselves, rather than outside interference." This policy brings economic cooperation between the two Koreas as follows and an increase of humanitarian aid and support from the South to the North.

=== Criticism against the "Sunshine Policy" ===
The first meeting of the two heads of the Koreas in Pyongyang in June 2000 was a breakthrough moment for a long-divided Korea. The "Sunshine Policy" contributes to build "shared identities" that are very important in the process of reconciliation and creates a "common cultural memory". However, it is criticised as pursuing peace without considering the human rights of North Korean citizens. This view brings the point that if the South only focuses on peace on the surface while North Korean citizens are suffering from the dictatorship of the North Korean government, it can be an act of "condoning their injustice and affirming their enmity."

== Northern Ireland reconciliation communities ==
In Northern Ireland, reconciliation theology emphasises the concepts of truth, justice, forgiveness and repentance. The discourse on reconciliation emerged in Northern Ireland during the 1990s with the beginnings of the peace process after the Troubles. It began with local academics and theologians but was picked up as an idea by politicians, policy-makers and religious leaders, who each understood it in differing ways and emphasised it for different reasons.

A theology of reconciliation is practically applied by Christian reconciliation communities. However, the term reconciliation was also used by politicians who adopted a similar usage to that of the reconciliation communities.

== Ukraine and Russia ==
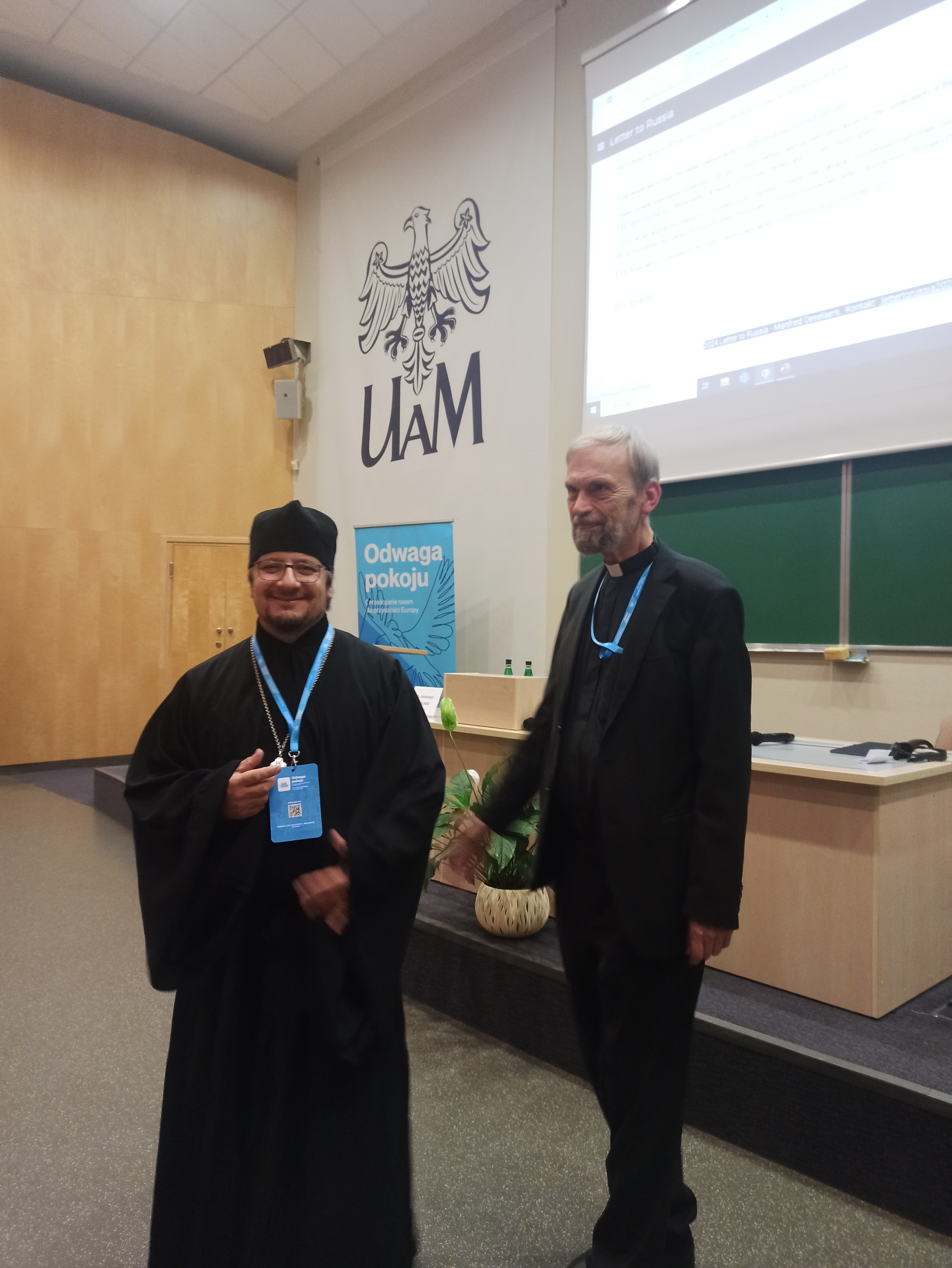
Rev. Walerian Dunin-Barkowski (on the left) and Rev. Manfred Deselaers (on the right) after presenting their letter to Russia during the 12th Congress of Gniezno, Poland (September 2025)

In 2024 Rev. Manfred Deselaers published A letter from Christians from Germany, Poland and Ukraine to the Christians of the Orthodox Church in Russia, which aims "to stop the hatred and destruction that is escalating in a terrible spiral". The letter also provides spiritual support for Russian pacifists, persecuted by the authorities. In 2025 he presented the letter during the international Congress of Gniezno.

== See also ==
- Christianity in Korea
- Christianity in South Africa
- Political theology in Sub-Saharan Africa
- Reconciliation (theology)
- Reconciliation theology in Northern Ireland
- Sociology of race and ethnic relations
