= Charles Nyamiti =

Tanzanian Catholic priest and theologian (1931–2020)

The Reverend Father Charles Nyamiti
- Father
- Church: Catholic Church

Personal details
- Born: 1931 Tabora, Tanzania
- Died: 2020 (aged 88–89) Tanzania

Charles Nyamìtì (1931 – 2020) was a Tanzanian Catholic priest and theologian known for his pioneer work in African theology.

== Biography ==
Nyamiti, a Wanyamwezi of Tanzania, was born in 1931 into a Christian home to Theophilus Chambi Chambigulu and Helen Nyasolo as one of three brothers and four sisters. He trained for the Catholic priesthood at Kipalapala Major Seminary in Tabora, Tanzania, and was ordained a Catholic priest in 1962. He went to Louvain University from 1963 to 1969, completing a doctorate in Systematic Theology and a certificate in Music Theory and Piano, and pursued a second doctorate in Cultural Anthropology and a Licentiate in Music Composition at the University of Vienna.

After his education, Nyamiti returned to Tanzania, serving as a professor at Kipalapala Major Seminary (1976—1981) and at the Catholic University of Eastern Africa (1983—2019) in Nairobi, Kenya.

After his time at the Catholic University of Eastern Africa, Nyamiti returned to the Archdiocese of Tabora and died on 19 May 2020.

== Theology ==
Nyamiti is known as a pioneer in African theology, drawing from a process of the inculturation to root Christian theology in both Thomistic and Bantu worldviews.

He is perhaps best known for his Ancestor Christology in his Christ as Our Ancestor (1984), where he speaks of Christ as "Brother-Ancestor."

== Works ==
- Nyamiti, Charles (1984). Christ as Our Ancestor: Christology from an African Perspective. Gweru, Zimbabwe: Mambo Press.
- Nyamiti, Charles (1978). African Tradition and the Christian God. Eldoret, Kenya: Gaba.
- Nyamiti, Charles (1984). The way to Christian theology for Africa. Eldoret, Kenya: Gaba. OCLC 7939734.
