= Jean-Marc Ela =

Cameroonian sociologist and theologian (1936–2008)

- Born: Jean-Marc Ela; 27 September 1936; Ebolowa, Cameroon
- Died: 26 December 2008 (aged 72); Vancouver, BC
- Occupations: Sociologist and theologian

Academic background
- Education: University of Strasbourg; University of Sorbonne

Academic work
- School or tradition: Catholic tradition
- Institutions: University of Yaoundé; University of Laval
- Main interests: African Christianity

Jean-Marc Ela (27 September 1936 – 26 December 2008) was a Cameroonian sociologist and theologian. Working variously as a diocesan priest and a professor, Ela was the author of many books on theology, philosophy, and social sciences in Africa. His most famous work, African Cry has been called the "soundest illustration" of liberation theology in sub-Saharan Africa. His works are widely cited as exemplary of sub-Saharan African Christian theology for their focus on contextualisation and their emphasis on community-centered approaches to theology.

== Biography ==
Jean-Marc Ela was born on 27 September 1936 in Ebolowa, in Cameroon. The son of a middle-class family, Ela claimed that he first began to think of theology as a discipline that should be concerned with the local needs of believers while he was studying philosophy and theology in France at the University of Strasbourg in the 1960s. He also studied sociology at the University of Sorbonne.

However, it was during his sixteen-year experience as a missionary working among the Kirdi of northwestern Cameroon that he developed and articulated most of the arguments in African Cry and My Faith as an African. He spent a great deal of his research and of his life beside Baba Simon, beloved minister to the Kirdis of the North Cameroon in Tokombéré. His thesis at Strasbourg was on the image of the cross in Luther's theology.

Ela was unique in that as a sociologist, he brought a social-science critique to his theology. As a theologian, he proved unorthodox not only in embracing social sciences but also in his penchant for studying topics that tested the boundaries of Catholic orthodoxy. As a missionary, he earned the respect and love of his community in Tokombere. As a professor, he was popular with students around the globe. He taught in Cameroon, Belgium, USA, Canada, Benin, France, and Congo, among other places.

A vocal critic of both ecclesiastical and political institutions, Ela entered voluntary exile in Quebec after the assassination of fellow Cameroonian priest Englebert Mveng in 1995. Ela resided in Montreal, where he worked as professor of sociology at the University of Laval from 1995 until his death 26 December 2008, in Vancouver. He was buried in his hometown of Ebolowa, Cameroon.

== Major works ==
Jean-Marc Ela acknowledged the value of the everyday practices of pagan village life.

African Cry and My Faith as an African, Ela's two most famous works, criticize the Catholic Church for holding to a model of faith that ignores the needs of African people, especially those in poor and rural communities. Through an analysis of selected sacraments, missionary structures, and biblical hermeneutics, Ela identified ways in which the Catholic tradition subordinates Africans to a position of dependence vis-a-vis White Europeans. He countered these instances of oppression with opportunities for liberation based on the argument that the Gospel advocates for the restoration of dignity to marginalised people.

According to Ela, the only way to restore dignity to African peoples is to allow them to transform Christian traditions into forms that are familiar and useful to Africans. He argued that the Eucharist should be served with local rather than imported products. He believed that African churches should be self-funded. He also believed that biblical interpretation should be guided by a "shade-tree theology", in which small groups of believers can gather together to interpret the Gospel in the light of their own particular circumstances.

Interspersed between his hard-hitting theological tones, Ela produced several volumes on social sciences in Africa. He was dedicated to opening a conceptual framework to encompass and address the needs of his countrymen. For example, he wrote in 2001 a guide explaining the imperative African researchers have to direct new research to meeting the basic needs of the population and not only to improve industrial production. Similarly, in several books published between 1998 and 2007, he showed the place of Africa in the world of rational science, and the necessity of high quality scientific work. In a book published in 2007, he tried to explain the inseparability of knowledge and power.

== Critique ==
The Cameroonian-American theologian David Ngong has criticized three of Ela's weaknesses. First is the "problematic equation of the oppressed with Jesus Christ." Second is his "extreme historicizing of the eschatological hope," arguing that Ela ignored the invisible realities that exist in addition to the tangible. Finally, Ngong states that Ela's theology often resorts to a "calumniation of Western Christianity."

== Tribute ==
Jean-Marc Ela was awarded the Grand Prix de la mémoire of the GPLA 2018.

== Bibliography ==
- 1971 La plume et la pioche. Yaoundé: Editions Clé.
- 1980 Cri de l'homme Africain. Paris: L'Harmattan. Translations in English (African Cry) and Dutch.
- 1983 De l'assistance à la liberation. Les tâches actuelles de l'Eglise en milieu africain. Paris: Centre Lebret. Translations in English and German.
- 1982 Voici le temps des héritiers: Eglises d'Afrique et voies nouvelles. Paris: Karthala. In collaboration with R. Luneau. Translation in Italian.
- 1982 L'Afrique des villages. Paris: Karthala.
- 1983 La ville en Afrique noire. Paris: Karthala.
- 1985 Ma foi d'Africain. Paris: Karthala. Translation in English (My Faith as an African), German, and Italian.
- 1985 Restituer l'histoire aux sociétés africaines – Promouvoir les sciences sociales en Afrique noire, Paris: L'Harmattan.
- 1989 Cheikh Anta Diop ou l'honneur de penser. Paris: L'Harmattan.
- 1990 Quand l'Etat pénètre en brousse... Les ripostes paysannes à la crise. Paris, Karthala.
- 1992 Le message de Jean-Baptiste: De la conversion à la réforme dans les églises africaines. Yaounde: Editions Clé.
- 1994 Afrique: l'irruption des pauvres. Société contre ingérence, pouvoir et argent. Paris: L'Harmattan.
- 1994 Restituer l'histoire aux sociétés africaines. Promouvoir les sciences sociales en Afrique Noire. Paris: L'Harmattan.
- 1998 Innovations sociales et renaissance de l'Afrique noire. Les défis du "monde d'en-bas". Montreal/Paris: Harmattan/L'Harmattan.
- 2000 Les Eglises face à la mondialisation: Quatre réflexions théologiques. Brussels: Commission Justice et Paix.
- 2001 Guide pédagogique de formation à la recherche. Paris: L'Harmattan.
- 2003 Repenser la théologie africaine: Le Dieu qui libère. Paris: Karthala.
- 2006 Travail et entreprise en Afrique: Les fondements sociaux de la réussite économique. Paris: Karthala.
- 2006 Fécondité et migrations africaines – Les nouveaux enjeux, written with Anne-Sidonie Zoa, Paris: L'Harmattan.
- 2007 L'Afrique à l'ère du savoir : science, société et pouvoir, preface of Hubert Gérard, Paris, L’Harmattan.
- 2007 Les cultures africaines dans le champ de la rationalité scientifique – Book II. Paris: L'Harmattan.
- 2007 La recherche africaine face au défit de l'excellence scientifique, Paris: L'Harmattan.
- 2007 Recherche scientifique et crise de la rationalité, Paris: L'Harmattan.

== See also ==
- Political theology in Sub-Saharan Africa
