= Rachel NyaGondwe Fiedler =

Malawian theologian and community worker

- Born: 1963 (age 62–63); Rumphi District
- Education: University of Malawi (Cert) Canberra College of Theology (BA) University of Malawi (MA) University of the Free State (PhD)
- Occupation: Lecturer
- Employer: Mzuzu University
- Known for: Feminist theology
- Spouse(s): Jande Banda (m. 1987; died 1999); Klaus Fiedler (m. 2001)

Rachel NyaGondwe Fiedler formerly Rachel NyaGondwe Banda (born 1963) is a Malawian theologian, church historian and community worker. She teaches in the Department of Theology and Religious Studies at Mzuzu University and is known for her work on African women's theology.

== Early life and education ==
Fiedler was born in 1963 in Rumphi District in Northern Malawi where she grew up in a rural village at a time when few girls in the area continued with their education. She completed her primary education at Luviri LEA School in 1979 and completed her secondary schooling at Marymount Girls Catholic Secondary School in Mzuzu in 1983. She obtained a diploma in agriculture at Bunda College of Agriculture in 1986; a University Certificate in Education at the University of Malawi, Chancellor College in 1994; she then began studying theology at Zomba Theological College in 1995 and transferred to Canberra College of Theology, where she graduated with a Bachelor of Theology in 1998. Fiedler gained a master's degree in theology and religious studies from the University of Malawi in 2001, and a doctorate in church history and polity from the University of the Free State in 2011.

== Career ==
Fiedler taught at Zomba Private Primary School from 1991; she later taught at Malawi Government secondary schools, Mulunguzi Secondary School in Zomba and then Bwaila Secondary School in Lilongwe. She was a part-time lecturer in Church History and the New Testament at Chancellor College (University of Malawi) from 2002 to 2007; she also lectured part-time at Zambezi College of Ministry. She joined Mzuzu University in 2008, teaching gender studies and church history; she went on to develop the university's courses in religion and feminist theology, African feminist theology, gender and human rights, and gender and development.

=== Circle of Concerned African Women Theologians ===
Fiedler joined the Circle of Concerned African Women Theologians in 2001 and has written on its history. The Circle is an ecumenical association established to investigate African women's theologies and to record and publish research on them. Fiedler submitted her doctoral thesis, "The Circle of Concerned African Women Theologians: History and Theology (1989–2007)" at the University of the Free State in 2010, under the supervision of Johannes W. Hofmeyer; it was later published in a revised and extended form by Mzuni Press in 2017. The book is distributed internationally through African Books Collective and Project MUSE. Fiedler coordinated the Malawi chapter of the Circle from 2003 to 2011, succeeding Fulata Lusungu Moyo, and convened its fifth and sixth conferences in 2005 and 2007.

Fiedler has also written about Baptists, tracing the history of Baptist women in southern Malawi and arguing that the Baptist denomination promotes women's empowerment and the expansion of their cultural sphere. She pays particular attention to women's roles in baptism and marriage.

== Reception ==
In reviewing A History of the Circle in the journal Exchange, Heleen Joziasse described the book as an insider account that employs the narrative method characteristic of Circle theology. She noted its treatment of the Circle in Malawi but criticised the organisational record as fragmentary and observed that the book says little about the content of Circle theology itself.

African Feminist Hermeneutics was reviewed by Mary Nyangweso in the Journal of Religion in Africa. Nyangweso explained that the book shows how feminism has evolved from an African perspective, highlighting a Malawian evangelical feminist hermeneutics described as "an irruption within an irruption". She found the chapters on biblical interpretation and local Malawian practices particularly insightful, but criticised the authors’ treatment of secular feminism as unsubstantiated, especially the claim that feminism's exclusion of men has led to rising single motherhood. She concluded that the volume highlights African women's contribution to feminist theological reflection beyond the global north.

Fiedler's earlier study Coming of Age has been cited in anthropological work on female initiation rites in Malawi, including in the Journal of the Royal Anthropological Institute, and African Feminist Hermeneutics is listed in Yale University Library's research guide to African Christianity.

== Community work ==
Fiedler has been the honorary director of the Lydia Foundation, later Lydia Action, in Zomba since 1998. The project has run tailoring, home-based care, and bursary schemes, and has supported the widows of Baptist pastors. She has also written health and gender education booklets in Chichewa and Chitumbuka, including material encouraging the use of clinics rather than traditional birth attendants for maternity care.

== Selected publications ==
- Rachel NyaGondwe Fiedler (Ed) (2024) Gender Based Violence in Malawi: Critiquing Beliefs and Practices that Impede Gender Equality (Luwinga: Mzuni Press)
- With C. Landman, "The Impact of Traditional Health Practices, Revivalism, Patriarchy and Economic Factors on the History of the Baptist Convention’s Health Response in Post-Independence Malawi", Studia Historiae Ecclesiasticae 50 (2), 2024
- With A. Kaminga, R. Munyenyembe and F. Kudzula, "The Church of the Covid-19 Pandemic: The Intricate Role of Masculinities of the Clergymen", Journal of Humanities 31 (1), 2023, pp. 21–41
- With J. W. Hofmeyr and Klaus Fiedler, (2016) African Feminist Hermeneutics: An Evangelical Reflection (Luwinga: Mzuni Press)
- Rachel NyaGondwe (2009) "The challenge of theological education for women in Malawi" Studia Historiae Ecclesiasticae, vol XXXV, Supplement, pp 119–134.
- Rachel NyaGondwe Banda (2005) Women of the Bible and Culture: Baptist Convention Women in Southern Malawi (Zomba: Kachere Series)

== Personal life ==
Fiedler married Jande Banda in 1987; he died in November 1999. In 2001 she married German missiologist Klaus Fiedler.
