= Manfred Deselaers =

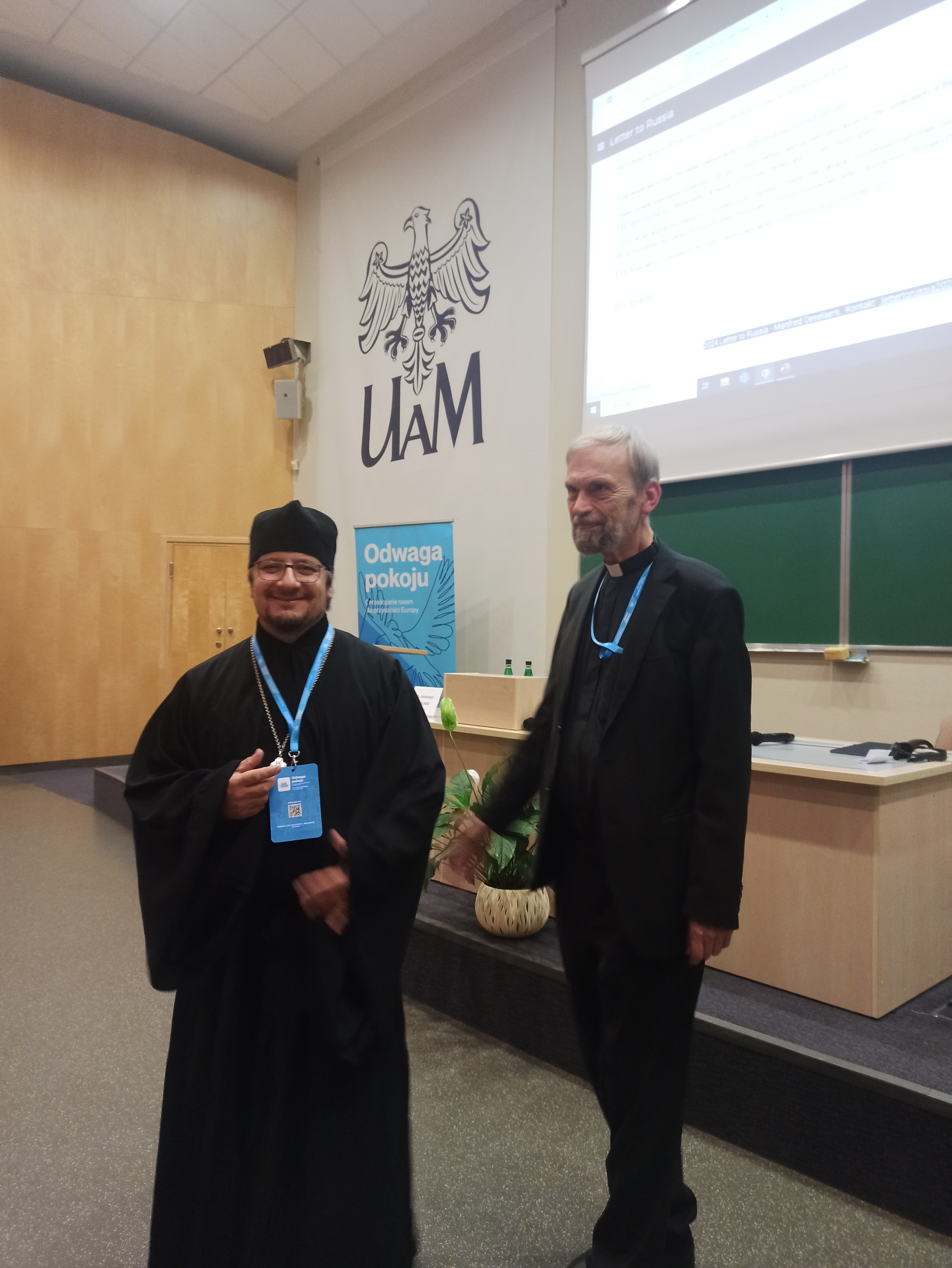
- Rev. Walerian Dunin-Barkowski (on the left) and Rev. Manfred Deselaers (on the right) during the 12th Congress of Gniezno, Poland (September 2025)
- Born: May 19, 1955 (age 71); Düsseldorf

Ecclesiastical career
- Religion: Christianity
- Church: Roman Catholicism
- Ordained: 1983

Manfred Deselaers (born 19 May 1955 in Düsseldorf) is a German Roman Catholic priest. Vice-President of the Kraków Foundation Center for Dialogue and Prayer in Oświęcim. Member of the International Auschwitz Council of the second and third terms.

== Biography ==
After graduating from a secondary school in Viersen in 1974, he started to study law in Bonn, but in 1975 he went to Israel to join the “Action Reconciliation / Service for Peace”. There he worked mostly in a home for disabled children (Beit Cholim Alyn) in Jerusalem. Next he studied theology in Germany (Tuebingen, (1976-1981) and the USA (Chicago, 1978-1979).

In 1983 he was ordained as a Catholic priest in Germany, where he became a Board member of the Society for Christian-Jewish Cooperation. Supported by Bishop Klaus Hemmerle, he went to Poland in 1989 to aid in German-Polish reconciliation. Initially, he studied the Polish language in Lublin and in 1990 he moved to the town of Oświęcim, close to the Auschwitz concentration camp.

He studied extensively the biography of Rudolf Hoess and in 1991 and 1996 he received his master's and doctoral degrees, respectively, at the Pontifical Academy of Theology in Kraków. His PhD thesis was entitled “God and Evil in the light of the biography and statements of Rudolf Hoess, commander of Auschwitz”.

In agreement with Cardinal Franciszek Macharski he is continuously involved in the German-Polish reconciliation and Christian-Jewish dialogue and since 1996 has been working at the Centre for Dialogue and Prayer (created in Oświęcim in 1992). In 2001 he became a member of its Board and in 2008 he was appointed as Vice President of the Kraków Foundation Centre for Dialogue and Prayer.

Since 1994 he has been a guide in the Auschwitz-Birkenau State Museum. He worked also a Holocaust Educator in Yad Vashem, Jerusalem. Since 1997 he has lectured on “Theology after Auschwitz” at the Pontifical Academy of Theology in Kraków.

In 2006-2018 he was a member of the International Auschwitz Council.

In 2024 he published A letter from Christians from Germany, Poland and Ukraine to the Christians of the Orthodox Church in Russia, which aims "to stop the hatred and destruction that is escalating in a terrible spiral". The letter also provides spiritual support for Russian pacifists, persecuted by the authorities. In 2025 he presented the letter during the international Congress of Gniezno.

== Major publications ==
- 1995: The Way of the Cross - Meditation in Auschwitz (Einhard Publishers, Aachen, 5th edition, 2001); in 1997 translated into Polish as Boże mój, Boże, czemuś mnie opuścił? (Centre for Dialogue and Prayer in Oświęcim).
- 1997: Und Sie hatten nie Gewissensbisse? Die Biografie von Rudolf Hoess, Kommandant von Auschwitz, und die Frage nach seiner Verantwortung vor Gott und den Menschen (Leipzig, St. Benno-Verlag; 2nd edition in 2001); in 1999 translated into Polish as Bóg a Zło (WAM Publishing House in Kraków).
- 2002: Edith Stein - Die Botschaft vom Kreuz und Auschwitz (“Edith Stein - Message of the Cross and Auschwitz”, Edith-Stein-Society, Germany).
- 2003: editor of the book Dialog u progu Auschwitz (“Dialogue at the threshold of Auschwitz”), translated into German in 2004 as Dialog an der Schwelle von Auschwitz (UNUM, Kraków).
- 2007: co-editor of the book Bóg i Auschwitz (UNUM, Kraków), in 2008 translated into English as God and Auschwitz (UNUM, Kraków).

== Awards ==
- 2000: the Polish Council of Christians and Jews awarded him the title "Person of Reconciliation".
- 2005: President Aleksander Kwaśniewski awarded him the Chivalry's Cross of the Order of Merit of the Republic of Poland.
- 2005: the Józef Tischner Award for pastoral and social initiatives contributing to the “Polish shape of Dialogue” in the Church and the world.
- 2008: President Horst Köhler awarded him the Cross of Merit, First Class, of the Order of Merit of the Federal Republic of Germany.
