= Santa Clara University Jesuit School of Theology =

Jesuit seminary in California, U.S.

- Latin: Schola Jesuita Theologiae de Universitas Santae Clarae
- Former names: Alma College (1934); Jesuit School of Theology at Berkeley (1969-2009)
- Type: Private Nonprofit
- Established: 1934
- Religious affiliation: Christianity (Catholic - Jesuit)
- Academic affiliations: GTU
- Rector: John P. McGarry, S.J.
- Dean: Agbonkhianmeghe Orobator, S.J.
- Faculty: 25 (18 full-time / 7 part-time)
- Postgraduates: 148
- Location: Berkeley, California, United States; 37°52′39″N 122°15′30″W
- Campus: Urban
- Website: www.scu.edu/jst

The Santa Clara University Jesuit School of Theology is a Jesuit seminary within Santa Clara University and one of the member colleges of the Graduate Theological Union (GTU) in Berkeley, California. Prior to its merger with Santa Clara University it was known as the Jesuit School of Theology at Berkeley (JSTB).

== Campus ==
JST is located two blocks north of the UC Berkeley campus, and about two blocks east of "Holy Hill", the central area of the Graduate Theological Union. JST accepts students who are lay or ordained.

== History ==
Originally established in 1934 at Los Gatos, California, as Alma College, JST was founded to serve the needs of the California and Oregon Provinces of the Society of Jesus.

In 1969, the school moved to Berkeley to join the Graduate Theological Union. That same year, its name was changed to the Jesuit School of Theology at Berkeley. JST is one of only two Jesuit-operated theological schools in the United States, the other being Boston College School of Theology and Ministry (formerly known as Weston Jesuit School of Theology) in Brighton, Massachusetts.

On 1 July 2009, Jesuit School of Theology at Berkeley merged with Santa Clara University, becoming Jesuit School of Theology of Santa Clara University. As such, JST followed the lead of the aforementioned Weston Jesuit School of Theology, which completed its affiliation with Boston College in June 2008.

== Academic program and accreditation ==
JST is accredited by the Western Association of Schools and Colleges, the Association of Theological Schools, and by the Vatican's Congregation for Catholic Education as a Pontifical university. In addition to participating in the Doctor of Philosophy (Ph.D.) program of the Graduate Theological Union, the JST offers the following degrees:

Civil Academic Degrees

- Master of Arts in Theology (MAT)
- Master of Arts in Biblical Languages
- Master of Divinity (M.Div.)
- Master of Theological Studies (MTS)

Pontifical Academic Degrees

- Bachelor of Sacred Theology (STB)
- Licentiate of Sacred Theology (STL)
- Doctor of Sacred Theology (STD)

== Notable alumni ==
- Greg Boyle, American Jesuit priest
- Chris Donahue (M.Div / Th.M. 1989), Academy Award-winning film producer
- Robert W. McElroy (S.T.L. 1985), American cardinal; eighth archbishop of the Archdiocese of Washington

== See also ==
- Alma College, Alma, California
- Boston College School of Theology and Ministry
- Graduate Theological Union
- List of Jesuit sites
- Santa Clara University
- Society of Jesus
