= International Review of Mission =

- Discipline: Missiology
- Language: English
- Edited by: Benjamin Simon

Publication details
- History: 1912-present
- Publisher: World Council of Churches (Switzerland)
- Frequency: biannual

Standard abbreviations
- ISO 4: Int. Rev. Mission

Indexing
- ISSN: 0020-8582 (print); 1758-6631 (web)
- OCLC no.: 23787461

Links
- Journal homepage

International Review of Mission (IRM) is a Bi-Annual academic journal covering various aspects of the Christian ministry that began to be published in 1912. It is a periodical by the World Council of Churches. The International Review of Mission (IRM) costs $118 for a yearly subscription and is available in The Americas, Europe, Africa, The Asian Pacific, and Japan.
