= Sarojini Nadar =

South African theologian and biblical scholar

- Born: February 6, 1976 (age 50); Durban, South Africa
- Occupations: Theologian, Biblical Scholar, Author, and Lecturer

Academic background
- Education: University of Cape Town (BA), (MA); University of Natal (PhD)

Academic work
- Institutions: University of the Western Cape

Sarojini Nadar (born 6 February 1976) is a South African theologian and biblical scholar who is the Desmond Tutu Research Chair in Religion and Social Justice at the University of the Western Cape.

== Early life and education ==
Sarojini Nadar, whose first name means "lotus flower", was born on 6 February 1976. She is of Indian descent and grew up in the Indian township of Phoenix, KwaZulu-Natal. Nadar is the youngest of seven children born to a poor family. Her father died when she was eight years old and none of her siblings finished high school. After experiencing abuse in the home, she left to live with an older sister in Grade 10. Nadar has been married to Poovan Nadar, a chemical engineer, since 1996 and they have two children.

She graduated from Effingham Secondary School in Durban in 1993. She has said that her career in gender and religion was shaped by reflections on how her mother's life was determined by cultural and religious norms, including being in an arranged marriage at 17, and the lack of opportunities she received.

Nadar received a Bachelor of Arts in English literature and religious studies from the University of Cape Town in 1996, and a Bachelor of Social Science in 1997 and Master of Arts in 2000 in biblical literature from the same university. She received her PhD in biblical hermeneutics and gender from the University of Natal in 2003 at the age of 27. Her thesis, titled Power, ideology and interpretation/s: womanist and literary perspectives on the book of Esther as resources for gender-social transformation, looked at the Book of Esther as a "text of terror" in normalising rape culture. While completing it, she confronted the man who had raped her, leading to a seven-year trial. Her rapist confessed before he died in 2010, leaving the trial unfinished.

== Career and research ==
Nadar was a professor at the University of KwaZulu-Natal. From 2005 until 2012, she was Director of the Gender and Religion Programme, which she cofounded. She was appointed Dean of Research for the College of Humanities in 2012 and promoted to Full Professor in 2014. She has said many of her students, who were mostly older men and leaders in the church, found it difficult to accept her as their teacher.

In 2014, Nadar was a Fellow of the Stellenbosch Institute For Advanced Study, working on a project on gender violence with Elisabeth Gerle. In 2016, she was appointed Director of the Desmond Tutu Centre for Religion and Justice, and Desmond Tutu Research Chair at University of the Western Cape.

Nadar's research has focused on gender and education, including gender-based violence, sexual and reproductive health, and critical pedagogy in higher education. She has published on feminist biblical hermeneutics with a special focus on HIV/AIDS and sexuality. She is on the editorial board of the Journal of Feminist Studies in Religion and is editor of the African Journal of Gender and Religion. She is a member of the Circle of Concerned African Women Theologians.

As an African feminist biblical scholar, Nadar uses a methodology she calls the "Tripolar Model", with three stages: conceptualisation, distantiation, and appropriation.

== Awards and honours ==
In 2012, Nadar received the KwaZulu-Natal's Distinguished Young Women in Science Award (human and social sciences) and in 2013, the university's Distinguished Teachers’ Award.

The South African National Research Foundation has awarded her its highest accolade, a Tier 1 Research Chair. Her 2012 book African Women, Religion and Health, co-edited with Isabel Apawo Phiri, won the UKZN's annual book award for Best Edited Book, and a New York Catholic Press award.

== Selected publications ==
=== Books ===
- Apawo Phiri, Isabel; Govinden, Devarakshanam Betty; Nadar, Sarojini (2002). Her-stories: hidden histories of women of faith in Africa. Cluster. ISBN 9781875053339.
- Phiri, Isabel Apwao; Nadar, Sarojini (2005). On Being Church: African Women's Voices and Vision. World Council of Churches. OCLC 253576247.
- Apawo Phiri, Isabel; Nadar, Sarojini (2012). African Women, Religion and Health: Essays in Honour of Mercy Amba Ewudziwa Oduyoye. Wipf and Stock. ISBN 9781620320921.

=== Chapters ===
- Nadar, Sarojini (2002). "Living in Two Worlds: Spirituality and the Changing Role of the South African Indian Woman in the Full Gospel Church". In Azila Talit Reisenberger (ed.). Women's Spirituality in the Transformation of South Africa. Waxmann. pp. 73–82.
- Nadar, Sarojini (2015). "'Barak God and die!': Women, HIV, and a theology of suffering". In R.S. Sugirthharajah (ed.). Voices from the margin: interpreting the Bible in the Third World. Orbis Books. pp. 189–20. ISBN 9781608334551.
- Nadar, Sarojini (2012). "Beyond the "Ordinary Reader" and the "Invisible Intellectual": Pushing the Boundaries of Contextual Bible Study Discourses". In Roland Boer; Fernando Segovia (eds.). The Future of the Biblical Past: Envisioning Biblical Studies on a Global Key. Society of Biblical Literature. ISBN 9781589837041.
- Nadar, Sarojini (2019). ""Stories are data with soul" 1: Lessons from black 2 feminist epistemology". In Tasha Oren; Andrea L. Press (eds.). The Routledge Handbook of Contemporary Feminism. Routledge. pp. 34–45. ISBN 9781317542636.

=== Journal articles ===
- Maluleke, Tinyiko Sam; Nadar, Sarojini (2002). "Breaking the covenant of violence against women". Journal of Theology for Southern Africa. 114: 5–17.
- Nadar, Sarojini (2004). "On being the Pentecostal church: Pentecostal women's voices and visions". The Ecumenical Review. 56 (3): 354–367. doi:10.1111/j.1758-6623.2004.tb00521.x.
- Apawo Phiri, Isabel; Nadar, Sarojini (2006). "What's in a Name? Forging a Theoretical Framework for African Women's Theologies". Journal of Constructive Theology. 12 (2): 5–24.
- Apawo Phiri, Isabel; Nadar, Sarojini (2009). ""Going Through the Fire with Eyes Wide Open":African Women's Perspectives on indigenous Knowledge, Patriarchy and Sexuality". The Study of Religion in Southern Africa. 22 (2): 5–21. JSTOR 24764316.
- Nadar, Sarojini (2009). "Palatable patriarchy and violence against wo/men in South Africa-Angus Buchan's Mighty Men's Conference as a case study of masculinism". Scriptura: Journal for Contextual Hermeneutics in Southern Africa. 102 (1): 551–561.
- Nadar, Sarojini; Potgieter, Cheryl (2010). "Liberated through Submission?: The Worthy Woman's Conference as a Case Study of Formenism". Journal of Feminist Studies in Religion. 26 (2): 141–151. doi:10.2979/fsr.2010.26.2.141. JSTOR 10.2979/fsr.2010.26.2.141.
- Apawo Phiri, Isabel; Nadar, Sarojini (2011). ""The personal is political" : faith and religion in a public university". Acta Theologica (Supplement 4): 81–94.
- Nadar, Sarojini; Phiri, Isabel (2012). "Charting the Paradigm Shifts in HIV Research: The Contribution of Gender and Religion Studies". Journal of Feminist Studies in Religion. 28 (2): 121–129. doi:10.2979/jfemistudreli.28.2.121. S2CID 144142146.
- Nadar, Sarojini; Van Klinken, Adriaan (2018). "Introduction:"Queering the Curriculum": Pedagogical Explorations of Gender and Sexuality in Religion and Theological Studies". Journal of Feminist Studies in Religion. 34 (1): 101–109. doi:10.2979/jfemistudreli.34.1.16.
- Nadar, Sarojini; Jodamus, Johnathan (2019). "'Sanctifying Sex': Exploring'Indecent'Sexual Imagery in Pentecostal Liturgical Practices". Journal for the Study of Religion. 32 (1): 1–20. doi:10.17159/2413-3027/2019/v32n1a5. S2CID 202418035.
