= Hekima University College =

Jesuit school of theology in Nairobi, Kenya

Coordinates: 1°18′4.34″S 36°46′27.5″E

- Type: School of Theology, Peace Studies and International Relations
- Established: 1984; 42 years ago
- Founders: Society of Jesus
- Religious affiliation: Catholic (Jesuit)
- Academic affiliations: The Catholic University of Eastern Africa
- Principal: Marcel Uwineza, SJ
- Dean: Stephen Eyeowa, SJ and Elisee Rutagambwa, SJ
- Location: Kangethe Rd. & Ngong Rd. Nairobi, Kenya
- Website: hekima.ac.ke

Hekima College is a Jesuit school of theology in Nairobi, Kenya, affiliated with the Catholic University of Eastern Africa. It opened in 1984 as a seminary for Jesuits studying to be priests. Since its opening, Hekima has diversified its student base. In 2004 it opened the Institute of Peace Studies and International Relations (HIPSIR).

== Overview ==
Founded upon traditional Jesuit educational principles, Hekima University College caters for the needs of men and women seeking to take their place in and contribute to the evangelising mission of the Church in variety of ministries.

Since 2015, the undergraduate theology programme has served a large spectrum of students, including lay women and men, and individuals from fourteen other religious congregations. The College's HIPSIR initiative was accredited by the Commission for University Education since 2007 and continues to extend its outreach.

Hekima also hosts the Jesuit Historical Institute in Africa (JHIA), organised in 2010 and dedicated in part to preserving the record of Jesuit missionary involvement in Africa.

== Academics ==
Hekima College began as the English-speaking Jesuit theologate in Sub-Saharan Africa for Jesuits studying for the priesthood, offering the same courses and programmes to lay women and men.

=== Programmes ===
- Bachelor of Theology (BTh): this program satisfies the requirements for the Bachelor of Sacred Theology Degree (STB) as set down in the Apostolic Constitution of Pope John Paul II, Sapientia Christiana, as well as the requirements for the Degree of Bachelor of Arts in Theology of the Catholic University of Eastern Africa.
- Post-Graduate Diploma in Pastoral Theology
- Master of Theology (MTh)

==== Offered through the Faculty of Theology of the Jesuits in Africa and Madagascar (FTJAM) ====
- Baccalaureate in Sacred Theology (STB)
- Licentiate in Sacred Theology (Systematic Theology) (STL)

=== Courses ===
- Lay Theological Formation
- Ignatian Directed Retreat
- Directed Retreat
- Certificate in Management
- Certificate in Catholic Social Thought & Peacebuilding
- Certificate in Post-conflict Transformation

=== Awards and Prizes ===
Hekima University College awards an annual prize for Excellence in Preaching in honor of the acclaimed American theologian and author, Frederick Buechner. Additionally, the College has regularly distributed copies of Buechner's works among its students.

== Hekima Institute of Peace Studies and International Relations (HIPSIR) ==
In 2004 Hekima inaugurated the Hekima Institute of Peace Studies and International Relations (HIPSIR). It offers a Master of Arts degree (MA) in conflict resolution and transitional justice in post-colonial Africa, as well as certificate courses in related topics. It also sponsors conferences and forums bringing together experts from across the continent and from abroad.

The institute's mission is "to build a society where human dignity is respected, human rights promoted, faith and justice upheld, economic and natural resources shared equitably, international relations founded on principles that promote and respect human life, individuals and institution in power are held accountable, and academic excellence is pursued with the aim of achieving full human potential for good."

HIPSIR publishes HIPSIR Newsletter and The Peace Dialogue.

== Student life ==
=== Mentorship programme ===
Since its founding, the Ignatian concept of cura personalis (the care of the whole person) has been central to the mentorship programme at Hekima. Students are accompanied through their respective programmes by an academic advisor.

=== Spiritual activities ===
Hekima College is founded on the Ignatian Spirituality. The College has historically endeavoured to promote Ignatian principles. Since its founding the Eucharist has been celebrated twice daily throughout the week, and College Mass every Wednesday.

=== Sports and clubs ===
The various sports engaged in by Hekima students have included football, basketball, volleyball, and table tennis. Historically there are several annual sports competitions, including a competition between current students and freshmen, and a competition between Jesuit and non-Jesuit students.

== See also ==
- List of Jesuit sites
