= African theology =

Christian theology from an African cultural perspective

African theology is Christian theology from the perspective of the African cultural context. It should be distinguished from black theology, which originated from the American and South African context and is more closely aligned with liberation theology. Although there are ancient Christian traditions on the African continent, during the modern period Christianity in Africa was significantly influenced by western forms of Christianity brought about by European colonization.

== African Patristic Theology ==
Many of the most influential church fathers were native Africans. Egypt proved to be especially fertile ground for theological thought, producing theologians of the caliber of Origen of Alexandria, whose influence on subsequent theology can hardly be overstated. Despite the official condemnation of certain of his ideas, his influence was ubiquitous in Late Antiquity, the Middle Ages, the Reformation, and beyond. Clement of Alexandria, Origen's teacher, was a prolific early Christian thinker. Athanasius of Alexandria led the struggle against Arianism, and defined orthodox Trinitarian theology in his many doctrinal works. Didymus of Alexandria, in addition to being a voluminous biblical commentator and doctrinal writer, was the teacher of such luminaries as Gregory of Nazianzus, Evagrius Ponticus, Jerome, and Rufinus. Cyril of Alexandria's writings on the unity of Christ defined the basic contours of what was to become orthodox Christology in subsequent centuries. Carthage also produced several eminent theologians, including Tertullian and Cyprian of Carthage. But without a doubt the greatest African theologian in antiquity, who indeed has often been seen as the most important theologian in the history of the Christian church, was Augustine of Hippo. It has long been recognized by modern scholars that Augustine’s theology determined the course of medieval and Reformation debates about grace and free will, in addition to providing a sophisticated model for Trinitarian thought (in the De Trinitate), creating what was in many ways a new approach to the genre of autobiography (in the Confessions), and laying the groundwork for later Western ecclesiologies (in the City of God and the anti-Donatist writings).

Thus, while the influence of European colonizers on African religion cannot be ignored, indigenous traditions of African theology have also exerted a profound and defining influence on European Christianity from antiquity to the present. The whole medieval tradition of biblical exegesis is dependent above all on Origen. The libraries of the medieval West were stocked with translations of his exegetical writings, and he is often quoted by name and with high praise. Thomas Aquinas alone cites him by name over one thousand times. And, of course, medieval theology would have been inconceivable apart from Augustine, who is quoted more than any other patristic author, and Jerome, the eminent student of Didymus the Blind and translator of the Latin Vulgate. Augustine's influence continued unabated from the Middle Ages to modernity. Indeed, colonial ideologies themselves often drew explicitly on Augustine. Cornell scholar Toni Alimi has shown that slavery formed an important part of Augustine's ethics, and was cited directly by European enslavers in the early modern period. Thus, the relationship between colonial European and indigenous African theologies is much more complex than it is sometimes made out to be.

Moreover, many African churches that flourished in antiquity have continued to exist up to the present time, with theological and liturgical traditions of their own. After the Council of Chalcedon in 451, the Church of the East (also known as the Nestorians) and the Miaphysites broke away from the Chalcedonians. Many Miaphysites were Copts (an indigenous Egyptian ethnic group) and went on to found the Coptic Orthodox Church, which endures to this day, with rich liturgical and theological traditions.

== Terminology ==
Black theology and African theology emerged in different social contexts with different aims. Black theology developed in the United States and South Africa, where the main concern was opposition to racism and liberation from apartheid, while African theology developed in the wider continent where the main concern was indigenization of the Christian message.

== Development ==
In the mid-20th century, African theology as a theological field came into being. This movement began to protest against negative colonial and missionary interpretations of the religion and culture in Africa. Realizing that theology is a contextual phenomenon, African Christians began to read the Bible using their own cultural lens, which of course resulted in some interpretations that did not always agree with how Western theology interpreted things. As such, African theology stands on the shoulders of the early African independent churches that broke away from missionary churches in the late 19th century or early 20th century. African theology is engaged to shape Christianity in an African way by adapting and using African concepts and ideas.

African theologians such as Charles Nyamiti, Bolaji Idowu, John Mbiti, and Kwesi Dickson have given an analysis and interpretation of the African traditional religion and point to its relation to the Christian faith. Lamin Sanneh and Kwame Bediako have argued for the importance of vernacularization of the Bible and theology. Kwame Bediako and John Pobee have developed an African Christology in terms of the ancestors.

There is also a movement of African female theologians, organized in Circle of Concerned African Women Theologians, inaugurated in 1989 by the Ghanaian Mercy Amba Oduyoye. Nowadays this is a movement of hundreds of women theologians from several African countries and with different religious backgrounds. The general coordinators of the circle have been Oduyoye, Musimbi Kanyoro, Isabel Apawo Phiri, Malawian Fulata Moyo, and currently Musa Dube.

African theology's leveraging of traditional culture and religion is concerning for some conservative Christians. Evangelicals such as Byang Kato have argued that such engagement results in religious syncretism. African Pentecostals have also seen traditional culture as custodians to idolatry and the occult. However, recent evangelicals have begun to wrestle with the quest of developing a Christian theology which has African context in mind. In this direction, African evangelicals have taken initiative to develop an African biblical commentary. Even though this is not a critical commentary, it shows a quest by African evangelicals to engage traditional and contemporary issues in Africa from an evangelical perspective. Secondly, African evangelicals have also taken initiative in the development of Christian ethics and texts on systematic theology which engage the various issues facing most African Christians. For example, Samuel Kunhiyop has engaged Christian ethics and systematic theology from an African evangelical perspective. Similarly, Matthew Michael has engaged systematic theology from the vantage point of African traditions.

Furthermore, the focus on tradition has been seen to restrict African theology. It does not allow theology to respond to the changing nature of culture, especially in light of the growing usage of digital technology.

== See also ==
- Black theology
- Christianity in Africa
- Womanist theology
