= Marange (disambiguation) =

Marange may refer to:

- Marange diamond fields, town and diamond fields in the Marange Tribal Trustland of Manicaland Province, eastern Zimbabwe
- Florian Marange (born 1986), a French footballer (soccer player)
- Johane Marange, a.k.a. Johane Maranke, Christian leader in Zimbabwe
- Marange Hera, brother of Seke Hera and minor chief in pre-colonial south-central Africa (Mashonaland), see Seke Rural

== See also ==
- Merengue (disambiguation)
- Various wine making communes in France:
  - Cheilly-lès-Maranges, in Saône-et-Loire department
  - Dezize-lès-Maranges, in Saône-et-Loire department
  - Marange-Silvange, in Moselle department
  - Marange-Zondrange, in Moselle department
  - Sampigny-lès-Maranges, in Saône-et-Loire department
