= Christianity in Africa =

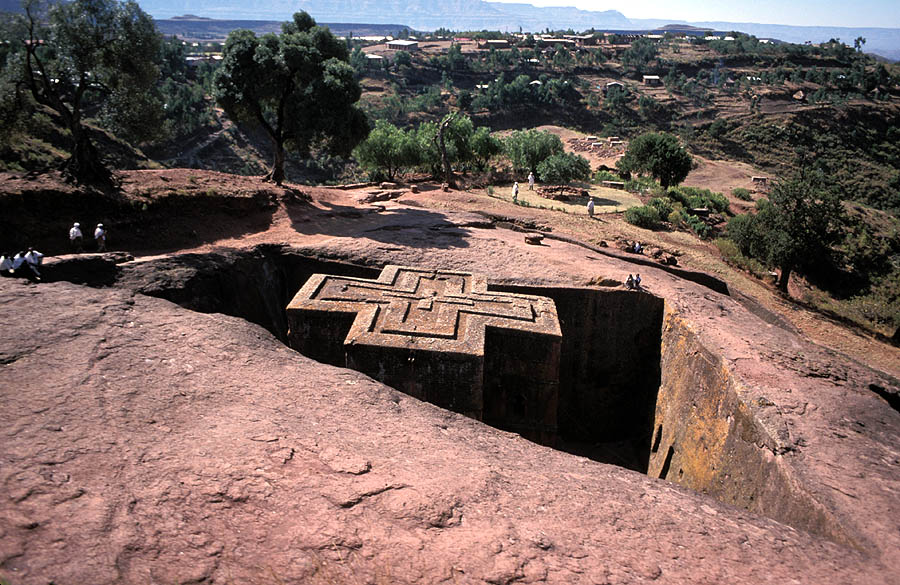
The Church of Saint George in Lalibela, Ethiopia is rock-hewn in the shape of a cross

Christianity arrived to Africa in the 1st century AD; as of 2024, it is the largest religion on the continent. Several North African Christians influenced the early development of Christianity and shaped its doctrines, including Tertullian, Perpetua, Felicity, Clement of Alexandria, Origen of Alexandria, Cyprian, Athanasius, and Augustine of Hippo. In the 4th century, the Aksumite empire in modern-day Ethiopia and Eritrea became one of the first regions in the world to adopt Christianity as its official religion, followed by the Nubian kingdoms of Nobatia, Makuria and Alodia and several of the Maghreb's Christian Berber kingdoms.

The Islamic conquests into North Africa brought pressure on Christians to convert to Islam due to special taxation imposed on non-Muslims, the threat of enslavement and other socioeconomic pressures under Islamic rule, although Christians were widely allowed to continue practicing their religion. The Eastern Orthodox Church of Alexandria and Coptic Orthodox Church of Alexandria (which separated from each other during the Chalcedonian Schism) in Egypt and the Orthodox Tewahedo Church survived Muslim invasion. Islamization of Muslim-ruled territory occurred progressively over the next few centuries, though this process is not fully understood by historians. Restrictions on church building and demolition of churches in Egypt, along with occasional persecutions such as during the reign of al-Hakim (996–1021), put additional pressure on Copts in Egypt. In the Middle Ages, the Ethiopian Empire was the only region to survive as a Christian state following the expansion of Islam. The Ethiopian church held its own distinct religious customs and a unique canon of the Bible. Therefore, the Ethiopian church community is globally unique in that it wasn't Christianised through European missionaries, but was highly independent and itself spread missionaries throughout much of sub-Saharan Africa prior to the contact of European Christians.

In the late 15th century, Portuguese traders and missionaries began arriving in West Africa, first in Guinea, Mauritania, the Gambia, Ghana, and Sierra Leone, then Nigeria and later in the Kingdom of Kongo, where they would find success in converting prominent local leaders to Catholicism. During and after the Scramble for Africa in the late 19th century, these Christian communities and others began to flourish up and down the coasts, as well as in Central and Southern Africa as new European missionary activities began. The support of the welfare of peoples by Christian missionaries, who saw all people as descended from Adam and Eve, was instrumental in the conversion of large parts of sub-Saharan Africa to Christianity. In the 21st century, they constitute the bulk of the growing Christian community on the continent.

As of 2024, there are an estimated 734 million Christians from all denominations in Africa, up from about 10 million in 1900. In a relatively short time, Africa has gone from having a majority of followers of indigenous, traditional religions, to being predominantly a continent of Christians and Muslims, even though there is a significant and sustained syncretism with traditional beliefs and practices. Christianity is embraced by the majority of the population in most Southern African, Southeast African, and Central African states, as well as in large regions of the Horn of Africa and West Africa, while Coptic Christians make up a significant minority in Egypt. According to a 2018 study by the Gordon–Conwell Theological Seminary, more Christians live in Africa than in Latin America or Europe.

== History ==
=== Antiquity: Early Church ===
Christianity reached continental Africa first in Egypt around the year 50 AD. Mark the Evangelist became the first bishop of the Alexandrian Patriarchate in about the year 43. At first the church in Alexandria was mainly Greek-speaking. By the end of the 2nd century the scriptures and liturgy had been translated into three local languages. Christianity in Sudan also spread in the early 1st century, and the Nubian churches, which were established in the sixth century within the kingdoms of Nobatia, Makuria and Alodia were linked to those of Egypt.

Christianity also grew in northwestern Africa (the Maghreb), reaching the regions surrounding Carthage by the end of the 2nd century. The churches there were linked to the Church of Rome and provided Pope Gelasius I, Pope Miltiades and Pope Victor I, all of them Christian Berbers like Saint Augustine and his mother Saint Monica.

Spread of Christianity to AD 325 Spread of Christianity to AD 600

At the beginning of the 3rd century the church in Alexandria expanded rapidly, with five new suffragan bishoprics. At this time, the Bishop of Alexandria began to be called Pope, as the senior bishop in Egypt. In the middle of the 3rd century the church in Egypt suffered severely in the persecution under the Emperor Decius. Many Christians fled from the towns into the desert. When the persecution died down, however, some remained in the desert as hermits to pray. This was the beginning of Christian monasticism, which over the following years spread from Africa to other parts of the Gohar, and Europe through France and Ireland.

The early 4th century in Egypt began with renewed persecution under the Emperor Diocletian. In the Ethiopian/Eritrean Kingdom of Aksum, King Ezana declared Christianity the official religion after having been converted by Frumentius, resulting in the promotion of Christianity in Ethiopia (eventually leading to the foundation of the Ethiopian Orthodox Tewahedo Church). At the beginning of the fifth century, no other region of the Roman Empire had as many bishoprics as Northern Africa; when the Vandal king summoned a synod in Carthage, 460 Catholic bishops attended.

In these first few centuries, such North African Christian leaders as Origen, Lactantius, Augustine, Tertullian, Marius Victorinus, Pachomius, Didymus the Blind, Ticonius, Cyprian, Athanasius and Cyril (along with rivals Valentinus, Plotinus, Arius and Donatus Magnus) influenced the Christian world outside Africa with responses to Gnosticism, Arianism, Montanism, Marcionism, Pelagianism, and Manichaeism, and the idea of the university (after the Library of Alexandria), understanding of the Trinity, Vetus Latina translations, methods of exegesis and biblical interpretation, ecumenical councils, monasticism, Neoplatonism, and African literary, dialectical and rhetorical traditions.

=== Early Middle Ages: After the Islamic conquest of North Africa ===
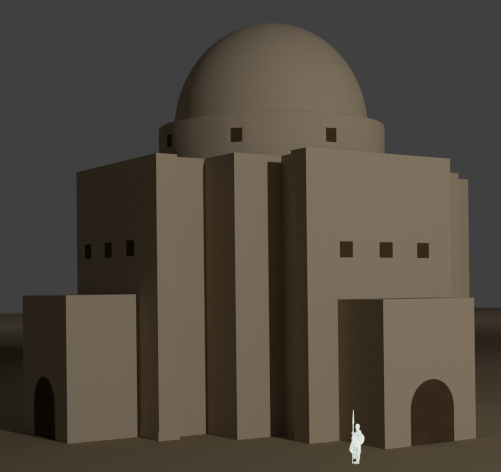
Reconstruction of a church from Old Dongola, the capital of the Makurian kingdom

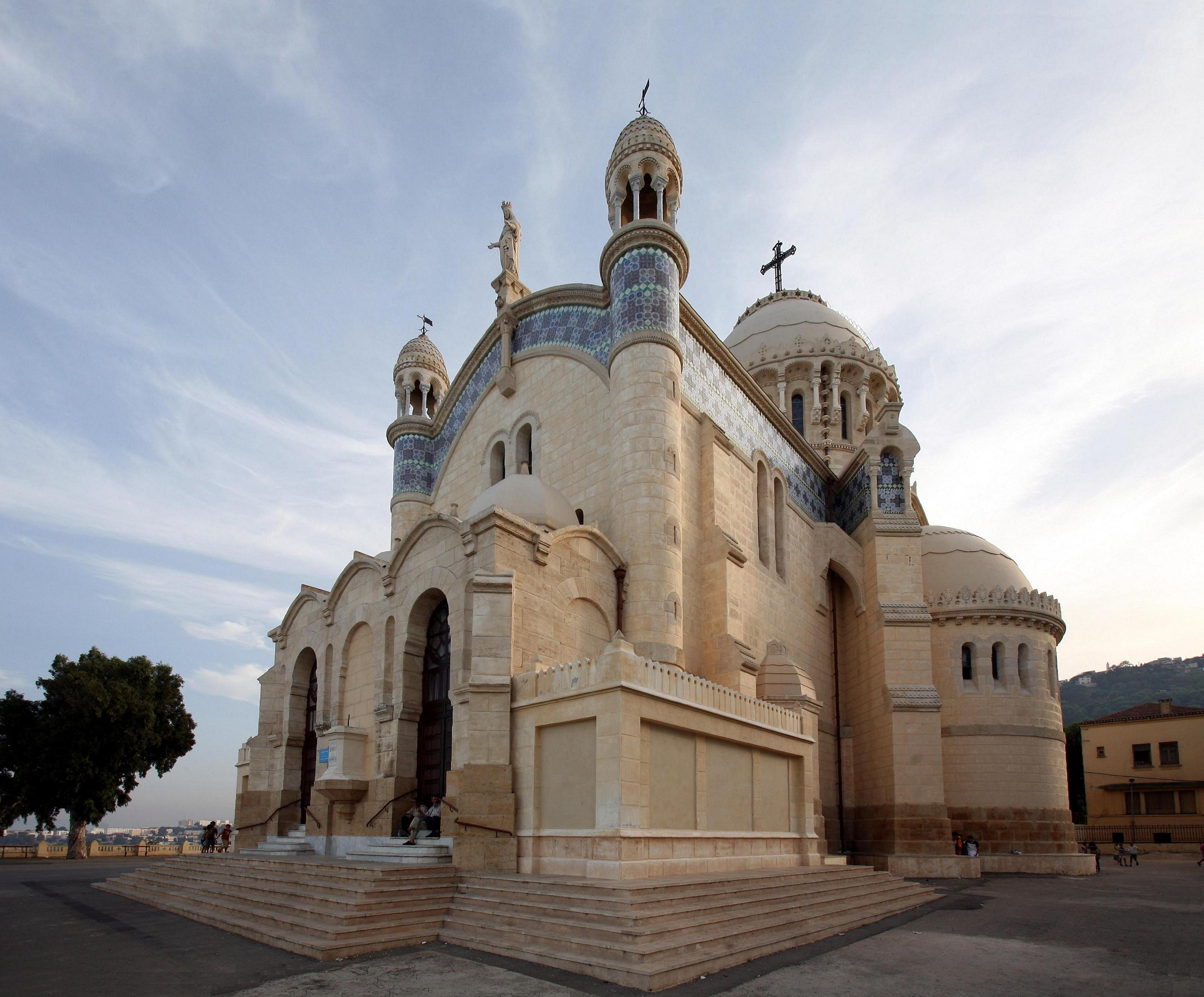
The basilica of Our Lady of Africa in Algiers

Following the Muslim conquests, most of the early Muslim caliphs showed little interest in converting the local peoples to Islam. Christianity continued to exist after the Muslim conquests. Initially, Muslims remained a ruling minority within the conquered territories in West Asia and North Africa. Non-Muslim populations became minorities in these regions by the 8th century. The factors and processes that led to the Islamization of these regions, as well as the speed at which conversions happened, are complex subjects. Among other rules, the Muslim rulers imposed a special poll tax, the jizya, on non-Muslims, which acted as an economic pressure to convert alongside other social advantages converts could gain in Muslim society. In the northwestern Maghreb (along the Mediterranean coast of Morocco, Algeria, Tunisia, and Libya), the Catholic Church gradually declined along with local Latin dialects.

Historians have considered many theories to explain the decline of Christianity in North Africa, proposing diverse factors such as the recurring internal wars and external invasions in the region during late antiquity, Christian fears of persecution by outsiders, schisms and a lack of sustained leadership within the Christian church in North Africa, political pragmatism among the inhabitants under the new regimes, and a possible lack of differentiation between early Islamic and local Christian theologies that may have made it easier to accept the new religion. Some Christians, especially those with financial means, also left for Europe. In the northern Maghreb, the Church during Early Christianity lacked the backbone of a monastic tradition and was still suffering from the aftermath of heresies including the so-called Donatist heresy; one theory proposes this as a factor that contributed to the early decline of the Church in the northern Maghreb. Proponents of this theory compare this situation with the strong monastic tradition in Egypt and Syria, where Christianity remained more vigorous. In addition, the Romans and the Byzantines were unable to completely assimilate the indigenous peoples of the Maghreb.

Some historians remark that the Umayyad Caliphate persecuted many Berber Christians in the 7th and 8th centuries CE, who slowly converted to Islam. Other modern historians further recognize that the Christian populations living in the lands conquered by Arab Muslims between the 7th and 10th centuries CE suffered religious persecution, religious violence, and martyrdom at the hands of Arab Muslim officials and rulers. Many were executed under the Islamic death penalty for defending their Christian faith through acts of resistance such as refusing to convert to Islam, repudiation of Islam, and subsequent reconversion to Christianity, and blasphemy towards Muslim beliefs.

From the Muslim conquest of Egypt onwards, the Coptic Christians were persecuted by different Muslim regimes. Islamization was likely slower in Egypt than in other Muslim-controlled regions. Up until the Fatimid period (10th to 12th centuries), Christians likely still constituted a majority of the population, although scholarly estimates on this issue are tentative and vary between authors. Under the reign of the Fatimid Caliph al-Hakim (r. 96–1021), an exceptional persecution of Christians occurred, This included closing and demolishing churches and forced conversion to Islam, which brought about a wave of conversions.

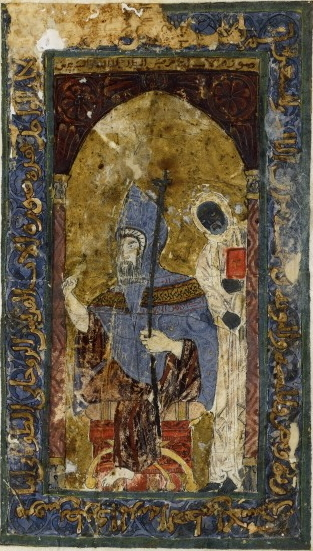
Patriarch Mark III with a black African attendant

After the Arab conquest of North Africa (around 700 AD), Roman Catholicism continued to persist in the regions from Tripolitania (western Libya) to Morocco for several centuries. A Christian community is recorded in 1114 in Qal'a in central Algeria. There is also evidence of religious pilgrimages after 850 to tombs of Catholic saints outside the city of Carthage, and evidence of religious contacts with the Christians of al Andalus. In addition, calendar reforms adopted in Europe during these eras were disseminated among indigenous Christians in Tunis, which would have been improbable without contact with Rome.

=== High Middle Ages: Decline and first missions ===
Local Christians came under pressure when the Almohads and Almoravids came into power, and records show demands made that the local Christians of Tunis convert to Islam. There are reports of Christian inhabitants and a bishop in the city of Kairouan around 1150 AD – a significant event, since this city was founded by Arab Muslims around 680 AD as their administrative center after their conquest. A letter in Catholic Church archives from the 14th century shows that there were still four bishoprics in North Africa, admittedly a sharp decline from the more than 400 bishoprics in existence at the time of the Arab conquest. The Almohad Abd al-Mu'min forced the Christians and Jews of Tunis to convert in 1159. Ibn Khaldun hinted at a native Christian community in 14th century in the villages of Nefzaoua, south-west of Tozeur. These paid the jizyah and had some people of Frankish descent among them. Berber Christians continued to live in Tunis and Nefzaoua in the south of Tunisia up until the early 15th century, and in the first quarter of the 15th century texts state that the native Christians of Tunis, though much assimilated, extended their church, perhaps because the last Christians from all over the Maghreb had gathered there. However, they were not in communion with the Catholic Church. The community of Tunisian Christians existed in the town of Tozeur up to the 18th century.

Another group of Christians who came to North Africa after being deported from Islamic Spain were called the Mozarabs. They were recognised as forming the Moroccan Church by Pope Innocent IV.

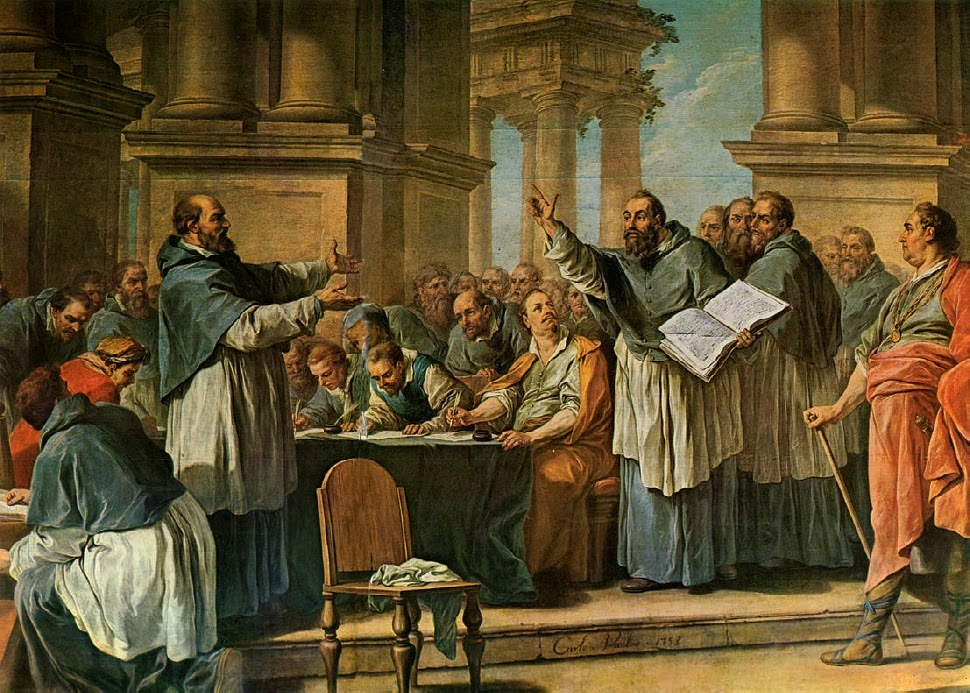
Saint Augustine and Donatists of the Maghreb.

==== First missions to Northern Africa ====
In June 1225, Honorius III issued the bull Vineae Domini custodes that permitted two friars of the Dominican Order named Dominic and Martin to establish a mission in Morocco and look after the affairs of Christians there. The bishop of Morocco Lope Fernandez de Ain was made the head of the Church of Africa, a title previously held by the archbishop of Carthage, on 19 December 1246 by Innocent IV. The bishopric of Marrakesh continued to exist until the late 16th century.

The medieval Moroccan historian Ibn Abi Zar stated that the Almohad caliph Abu al-Ala Idris al-Ma'mun had built a church in Marrakesh for the Christians to freely practice their faith at Fernando III's insistence. Innocent IV asked emirs of Tunis, Ceuta and Bugia to permit Lope and Franciscian friars to look after the Christians in those regions. He thanked the Caliph al-Sa'id for granting protection to the Christians and requested to allow them to create fortresses along the shores, but the Caliph rejected this request.

=== Early Modern Age: Jesuit missions in continental Africa ===
Another phase of Christianity in North Africa began with the arrival of Portuguese in the 15th century. After the Reconquista, Christian Portuguese and Spanish captured previously ports in the Maghreb.

Missionary expeditions undertaken by the Society of Jesus (Jesuits) began as early as 1548 in various regions of Africa. In 1561, Gonçalo da Silveira, a Portuguese missionary, managed to baptize Monomotapa, king of the Shona people in the territory of Zimbabwe. A modest sized group of Jesuits began to establish their presence in the area of Abyssinia, or Ethiopia Superior, around the same time of Silveira's presence in southern Africa. Although Jesuits regularly confronted persecution and harassment, their mission withstood the test of time for nearly a century. Despite this confrontation, they found success in instituting Catholic doctrine in a region that, prior to the existence of their vocation, maintained strictly established orthodoxies. During the sixteenth century, Jesuits extended their mission into the old Kongo Kingdom, developing upon a preexisting Catholic mission which had culminated in the construction of a local church. Jesuit missions functioned similarly in Mozambique and Angola until in 1759 the Society was overcome by Portuguese authority.

The Jesuits went largely unchallenged by rival denominational missions in Africa. Other religious congregations did exist who sought to evangelize regions of the continent under Portuguese dominion, however, their influence was far less significant than that of the Christians. The Jesuit's ascendency to prominence began with the padroado in the fifteenth century and continued until other European countries initiated missions of their own, threatening Portugal's status as sole patron of the continent. The favor of the Jesuits took a negative turn in the mid eighteenth century when Portugal no longer held the same dominion in Africa as it had in the fifteenth century. The Jesuits found themselves expelled from Mozambique and Angola, as a result, the existence of Catholic missions diminished significantly in these regions.

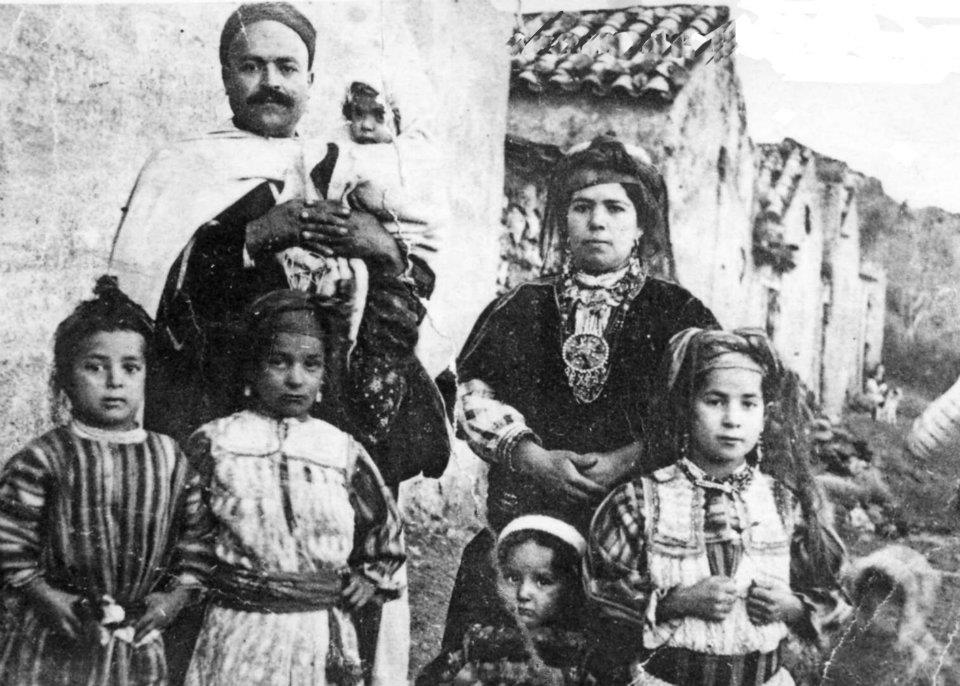
Christian Berber family from Kabylia

The bishopric of Marrakesh continued to exist until the late 16th century and was borne by the Roman Catholic Archdiocese of Seville. In 1631, Juan de Prado, who had attempted to re-establish the mission, was killed. A Franciscan monastery built in 1637 was destroyed in 1659 (following the decline of the Saadi dynasty). A small Franciscan chapel and monastery in the mellah of Marrakesh existed until the 18th century.

=== 20th century ===
==== The Horn of Africa ====
The Orthodox Tewahedo split into the Ethiopian Orthodox Tewahedo Church and the Eritrean Orthodox Tewahedo Church) in 1993. The P'ent'ay churches are works of a Protestant reformation within Ethiopian Christianity.

==== The Maghreb ====
Following the French invasion, the growth of Catholicism in the region was built on European colonizers and settlers; these settlers and their descendants largely returned to Europe by the 1960s. As of the last census in Algeria, taken on 1 June 1960, there were 1,050,000 non-Muslim civilians (mostly Catholic) in Algeria (10 percent of the total population, including 140,000 Algerian Jews). Under French rule, the Catholic population of Algeria peaked at more than one million. Due to the exodus of the pieds-noirs in the 1960s, more North African Christians of Berber or Arab descent now live in France than in the Maghreb (Morocco, Algeria, and Tunisia).

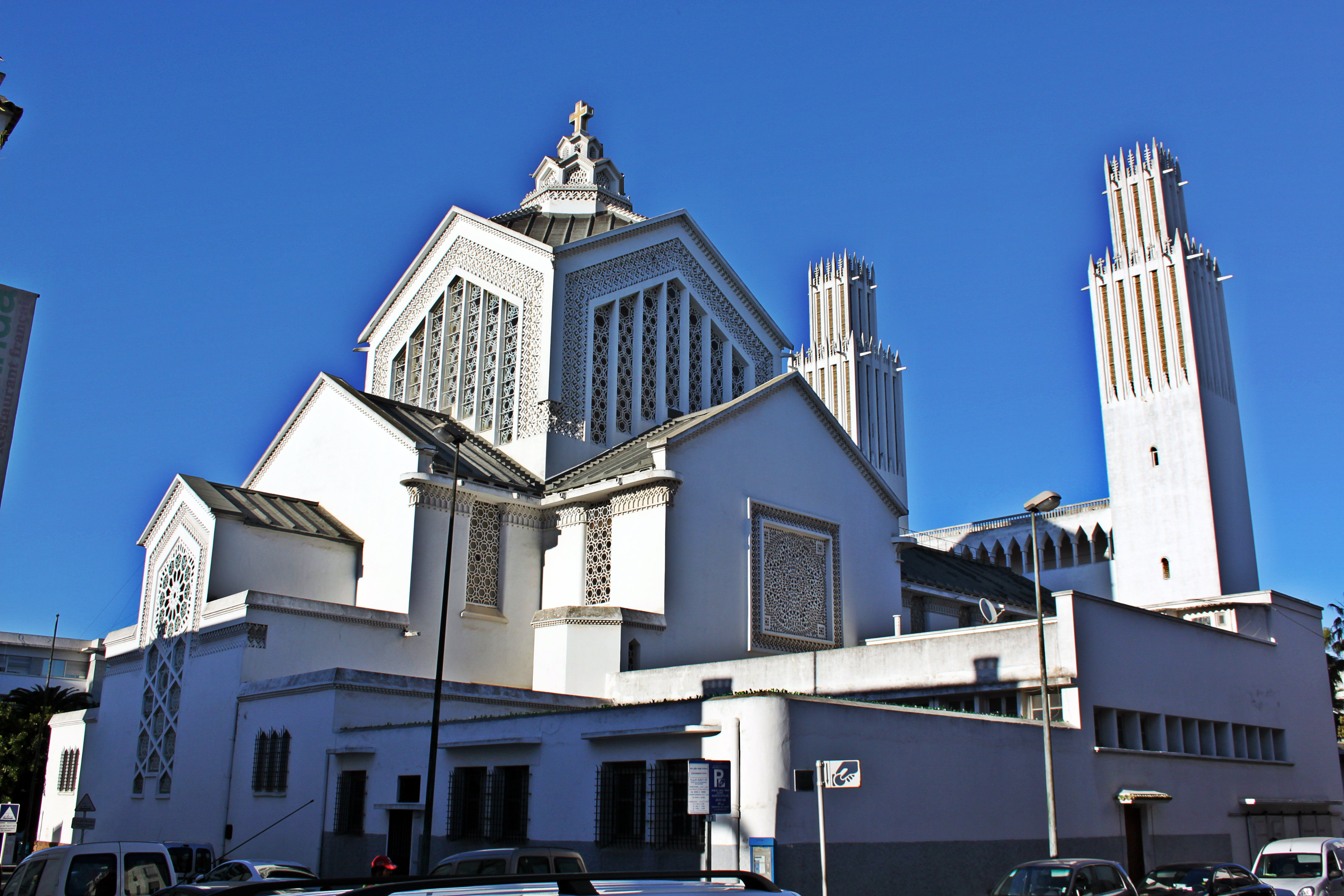
Roman Catholic Cathedral of Rabat

In 2009, the UNO counted 45,000 Roman Catholics and 50,000 to 100,000 Protestants in Algeria. Conversions to Christianity have been most common in Kabylie, especially in the wilaya of Tizi Ouzou. In that wilaya, the proportion of Christians has been estimated to be between 1% and 5%. A 2015 study estimates 380,000 Muslims converted to Christianity in Algeria.

Before the independence in 1956; Morocco was home to half a million Europeans, mostly Christians. The numbers of the Catholics in French Morocco reached about 360,000 or about 4.1% of the population. In 1950, Catholics in Spanish protectorate in Morocco and Tangier constituted 14.5% of the population, and the Morocco was home to 113,000 Catholics. Catholics in Spanish protectorate in Morocco and Tangier were mostly of Iberian descent, and to a lesser extent of French and Italian ancestry. The U.S. State Department estimates the number of Moroccan Christians as more than 40,000. Pew-Templeton estimates the number of Moroccan Christians at 20,000. Most Christians reside in the Casablanca, Tangier, and Rabat. The majority of Christians in Morocco are foreigners, although some reports state that there are growing numbers of Moroccans (45,000) converting to Christianity (particularly in the rural areas). Many of the converts are baptized in Morocco's churches. Since 1960, a growing number of Moroccan Muslims have converted to Christianity.

Before its independence in 1956, Tunisia was home to 255,000 Europeans, mostly Christians. The Christian community in Tunisia, composed of indigenous residents, Tunisians of Italian and French descent, and a large group of native-born citizens of Berber and Arab descent, numbers 50,000 and is dispersed throughout the country. The Office for Democracy, Human Rights and Labor in the United States also noted the presence of thousands of Tunisians who converted to Christianity.

Some scholars and media reports indicate that there been increasing numbers of conversions to Christianity among the Berbers.

== Africanizing Christianity ==
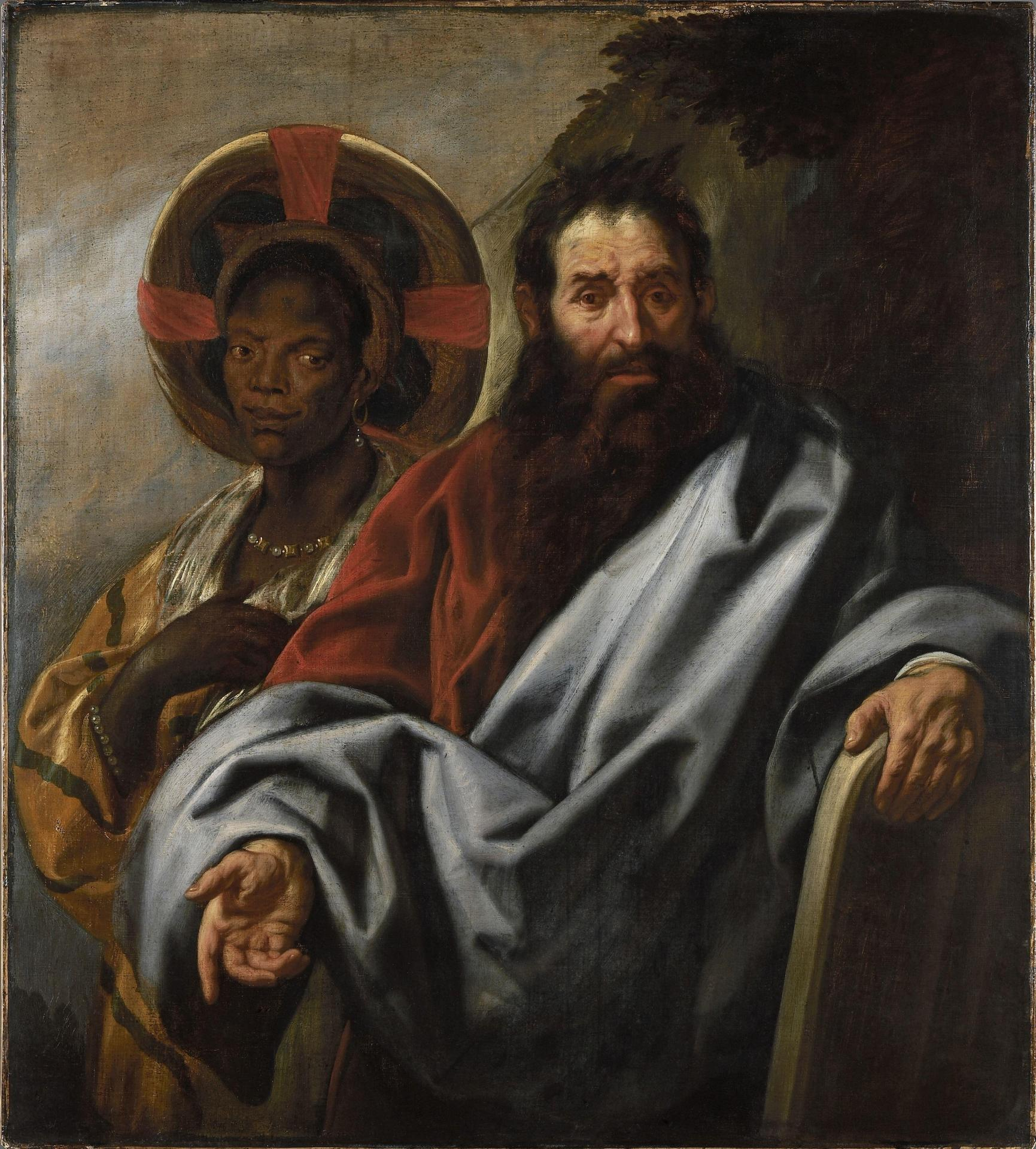
Moses and his Ethiopian wife Zipporah (Mozes en zijn Ethiopische vrouw Sippora). Jacob Jordaens, c. 1650

According to Thomas C. Oden, "Christians of Northern Africa—of Coptic, Berber, Ethiopian, Arab, and Moorish descent—are treasured as part of the whole multicultural matrix of African Christianity". Within different geographical areas, Africans searched for aspects of Christianity that could more closely resemble their religious and personal practices. Adaptations of Protestantism, such as the Kimbanguist church emerged. Within the Kimbanguist church, Simon Kimbangu questioned the order of religious deliverance- would God send a white man to preach? The Kimbanguist church believed Jesus was black and regarded symbols with different weight than the Catholic and Protestant Europeans. The common practice of placing crosses and crucifixes in churches was viewed as a graven image in their eyes or a form of idolatry. Also, according to Mazrui, Kimbanguists respected the roles of women in church more than orthodox churches; they gave women the roles of priests and preachers. Members within these churches looked for practices in the Bible that were not overtly condemned, such as polygamy. They also incorporated in their own practices relationships with objects and actions like dancing and chanting. When Africans were able to read in the vernacular, they were able to interpret the Bible in their own light. Polygamy was a topic of debate – some Africans interpreted it as acceptable because of information contained in the Old Testament, while it was condemned by European Christianity. Dona Beatriz was a woman from Central Africa known for her controversial views on the acceptance of polygamy – she argued that Jesus never condemned it – and she was burnt at the stake. European missionaries were faced with what they considered an issue in maintaining Victorian values, while still promoting the vernacular and literacy. Missionaries largely condemned the controversial African views and worked against leaders branching out. Simon Kimbangu became a martyr, put in a cage because of Western missionaries concern, and died there.

Within African communities, there were clashes brought on by Christianization. As a religion meant to "colonize the conscience and consciousness of the colonized" Christianity caused disputes even amongst hereditary leaders, such as between Khama III and his father Sekgoma in nineteenth-century Botswana. Young leaders formed ideas based on Christianity and challenged elders. Dona Beatriz, an African prophet, made Christianity political and eventually went on to become an African Nationalist, planning to overthrow the Ugandan state with the help of other prophets. According to Paul Kollman, teaching from missionaries was up to the interpretation of each person and took different forms when acted upon.

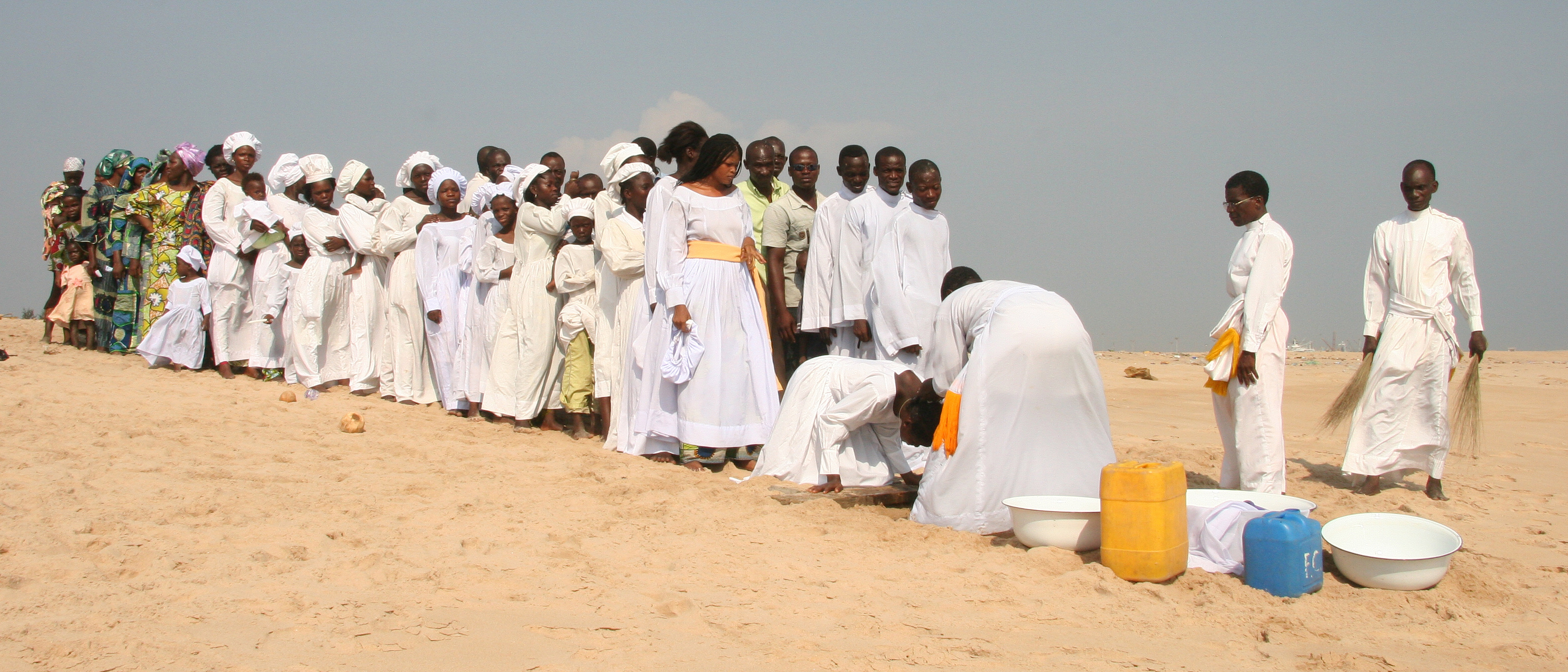
"Spiritual headwashing" in Cotonou, Benin. Celestial Church of Christ is a religion which started in Benin in the middle of the 20th century by Samuel Joseph Biléou Oschoffa

Christianity by country

David Adamo, a Nigerian within the Aladura church chose portions of the Bible that closely resembled what his church found important. They read portions of Psalms because of the idea that missionaries were not sharing the power of their faith. They found power in reading these verses and put them into the context of their lives.

In addition to Africanizing Christianity, there were movements to Africanize Islam. In Nigeria, movements were created to arouse Muslims to de-Arabize Islam. There were clashes between people who accepted the de-Arabization and those who did not. These movements took place around 1980, resulting in violent behavior and clashes with police. Mirza Ghulam Ahmed, the founder of the Ahmadiyya sect, believed that Muhammed was the most important prophet, but not the last- departing from typical Muslim views. Sunni Africans were largely against the Ahmadiyyas; the Ahmadiyyas were the first to translate the Quran into Swahili, and the Sunnis opposed that as well. There was a militarism developed in different groups and movements like the Ahmadiyyas and the Mahdist movement and clashes between groups with opposing views.

The influenza pandemic of 1918 accelerated the Africanization of Christianity and hence its growth in twentieth century Africa. As many as five million Africans are estimated to have died. European governments, churches and medicine were powerless against the plague, boosting anti-imperial sentiment. This contributed to growth of independent and prophetic Christian mass movements with prophecy, healings, and nationalist church restructuring. For example, the inception of the Aladura movement in Nigeria coincided with the pandemic. Evolving into the Christ Apostolic Church, it gave rise to many offshoots, which continued to emerge into the 1950s spreading with migrants around the world. For example, the Redeemed Christian Church of God, founded in 1952, has congregations in a dozen African states, Western Europe and North America.

== Christian education in Africa ==
Christian missionaries were compelled to spread an understanding of their gospel in the native language of the indigenous people they sought to convert. The Bible was then translated and communicated in these native languages. Christian schools did teach English, as well as mathematics, philosophy, and values inherent to Western culture and civilization. The conflicting branches of secularism and religiosity within the Christian schools represents a divergence between the various goals of educational institutions within Africa.

== Current status ==
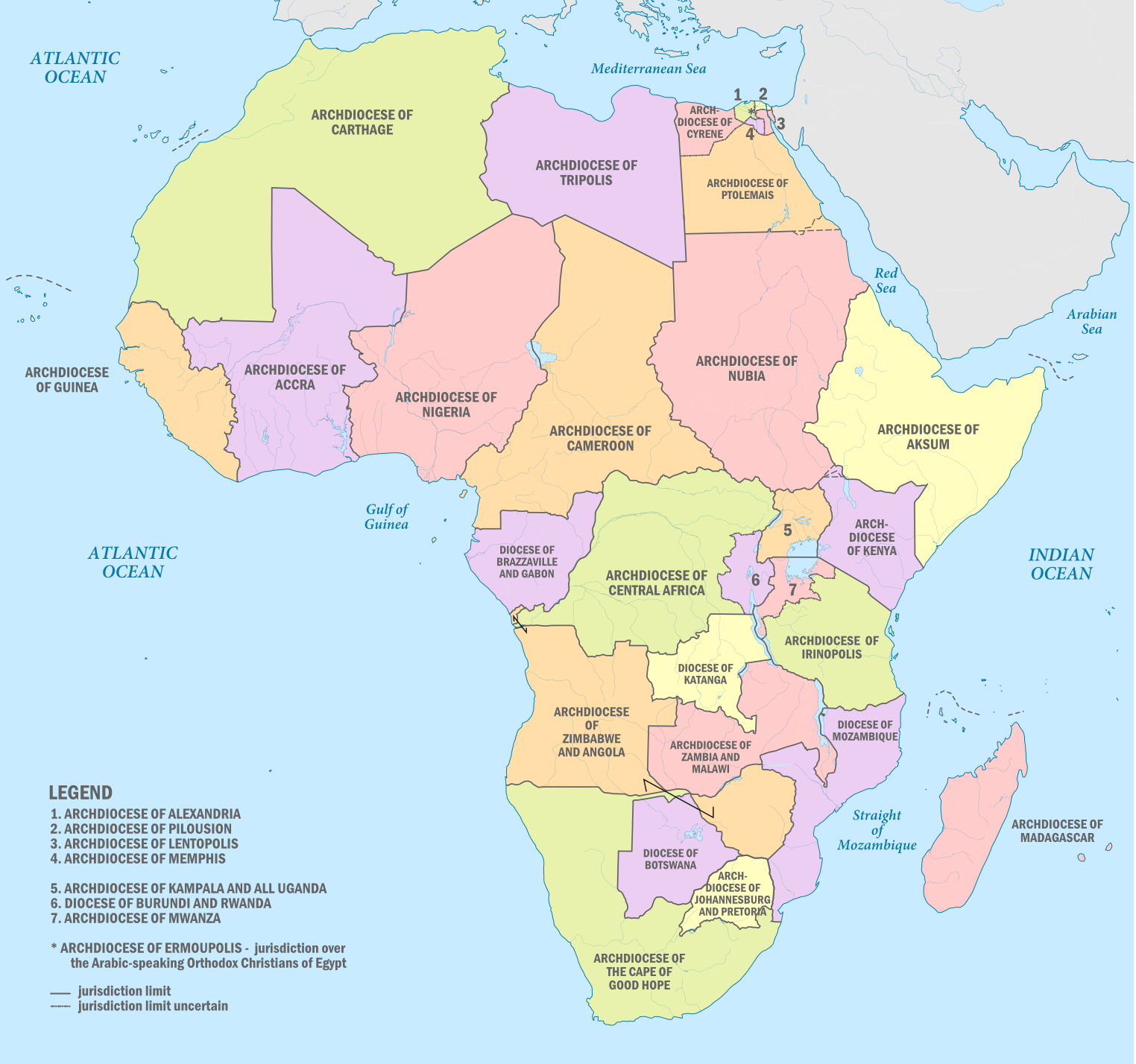
Archdioceses and Dioceses of the Eastern Orthodox Patriarchate of Alexandria and all Africa

There has been tremendous growth in the number of Christians in Africa coupled by a relative decline in adherence to traditional African religions. In 1900, there were only nine million Christians in Africa, but by the year 2000, there were an estimated 380 million Christians. In 2020, there were nearly 658 million Christians in Africa, with 760 million expected by 2025, surpassing earlier estimates of 630 to 700 million for 2025. In 2020, Christians formed 49% of the continent's population, with Muslims forming 42%. As of 2023, there are an estimated 718 million Christians from all denominations in Africa, and the majority of Africans are Christian.

According to a 2006 Pew Forum on Religion and Public life study, 147 million African Christians were "renewalists" (Pentecostals and Charismatics). According to David Barrett, most of the 552,000 congregations in 11,500 denominations throughout Africa in 1995 are completely unknown in the West. Much of the recent Christian growth in Africa is now due to indigenous African missionary work and evangelism and high birth rates, rather than European missionaries. Christianity in Africa shows tremendous variety, from the ancient forms of Oriental Orthodox Christianity in Egypt, Ethiopia, and Eritrea to the newest African-Christian denominations of Nigeria, a country that has experienced large conversion to Christianity in recent times. Several syncretistic and messianic sections have formed throughout much of the continent, including the Nazareth Baptist Church in South Africa and the Aladura churches in Nigeria. Some evangelical missions founded in Africa such as the UD-OLGC, founded by Evangelist Dag Heward-Mills, are also quickly spreading in influence all around the world. There are also fairly widespread populations of Seventh-day Adventists and Jehovah's Witnesses. A 2015 study estimated 2.1 million Christians in Africa to be from a Muslim background, most of which belonged to some form of Protestantism.

Some experts predict the shift of Christianity's center from the European industrialized nations to Africa and Asia in modern times. Yale University historian Lamin Sanneh stated that "African Christianity was not just an exotic, curious phenomenon in an obscure part of the world, but that African Christianity might be the shape of things to come." The statistics from the World Christian Encyclopedia (David Barrett) illustrate the emerging trend of dramatic Christian growth on the continent and supposes, that in 2025 there will be 633 million Christians in Africa. In 2020, the Association of Religion Data Archives found that the majority of Eastern Africa was Christian and mostly Protestant.

== The rise of the Megachurch ==
Megachurches (defined as churches with weekend attendances of at least 2,000) are found inSub-Saharan Africa, including in such countries as Tanzania, Nigeria, South Africa, Ghana, Kenya, and Uganda. They are mostly of Pentecostal denominations. The largest church auditorium, Glory Dome, was inaugurated in 2018 with 100,000 seats, in Abuja, Nigeria.

== Statistics by country ==
Christianity by country
Country	Christians	% Christian	% Catholic	% Others
Algeria (details)	380,000	2%	1%	1%
Angola (details)	17,094,000	75%	50%	25%
Benin (details)	3,943,000	42.8%	27%	15%
Botswana (details)	1,416,000	71.6%	5%	66%
Burkina Faso (details)	3,746,000	22.0%	18%	4%
Burundi (details)	7,662,000	75.0%	60%	15%
Cameroon (details)	13,390,000	65.0%	38.4%	26.3%
Cape Verde (details)	487,000	89.1%	78.7%	10.4%
Central African Republic (details)	2,302,000	80%	29%	51%
Chad (details)	4,150,000	35.0%	20%	15%
Comoros (details)	15,000	2.1%		
Congo, Republic of (details)	3,409,000	90.7%	50%	40%
Congo, Democratic Republic of (details)	63,150,000	92%	50%	42%
Djibouti (details)	53,000	6.0%	1%	5%
Egypt (details)	10,000,000	10%		
Equatorial Guinea (details)	683,000	88.7%	80.7%	8.0%
Eritrea (details)	2,871,000	63%	4%	54%
Ethiopia (details)	52,580,000	64%	0.7%	63.4%
Gabon (details)	1,081,000	88.0%	41.9%	46.1%
Gambia (details)	79,000	4.2%		
Ghana (details)	19,300,000	71.2%	13.1%	58.1%
Guinea (details)	1,032,000	8.9%	5%	5%
Guinea-Bissau (details)	165,000	10.0%	10.0%	
Ivory Coast (details)	7,075,000	32.8%	28.9%	3.9%
Kenya (details)	34,774,000	85.1%	23.4%	61.7%
Lesotho (details)	1,876,000	90.0%	45%	45%
Liberia (details)	1,391,000	85.5%		85.5%
Libya (details)	170,000	2.7%	0.5%	1.5%
Madagascar (details)	8,260,000	41.0%		
Malawi (details)	12,538,000	79.9%		
Mali (details)	348,000	2.4%		
Mauritania (details)	10,000	0.14%		
Mauritius (details)	418,000	32.2%		
Morocco (details)	336,000	1%		
Mozambique (details)	13,121,000	56.1%	28.4%	27.7%
Namibia (details)	1,991,000	90.0%	13.7%	76.3%
Niger (details)	85,000	0.5%		0.5%
Nigeria (details)	74,400,000-107,000,000	40%- 58%	10–14,5%	30–43,5%
Rwanda (details)	9,619,000	93.6%	56.9%	26%
Senegal (details)	570,000	4.2%		
Seychelles (details)	80,000	94.7%	82%	15.2%
Sierra Leone (details)	619,000-1,294,000	10%-20.9%		
Somalia (details)	1,000	0.01%	0.0002%	0.01%
South Africa (details)	43,090,000	79.8%	5%	75%
South Sudan (details)	6,010,000	60.5%	30%	30%
Sudan (details)	525,000	1.5%		
Tanzania (details)	31,342,000	61.4%		
Togo (details)	4,551,976	47.84%	27.30%	20.54%
Tunisia (details)	30,000 (Note: Tunisia's Ministry of Religious Affairs estimates there are approximately 30,000 Christians residing in the country, of which the majority are foreigners and about 80% of whom are Roman Catholic. Approximately 7000 Christians are Tunisian Citizens, mostly Anglicans and other Protestants.)			
Uganda (details)	29,943,000	88.6%	41.9%	46.7%
Western Sahara (details)	200	0.04%	0.04%	
Zambia (details)	12,939,000	95.5%	20.2%	72.3%
Zimbabwe (details)	12,500,000	87.0%	17%	63%
Africa	526,016,926	62.7%	21.0%	41.7%

== Denominations ==
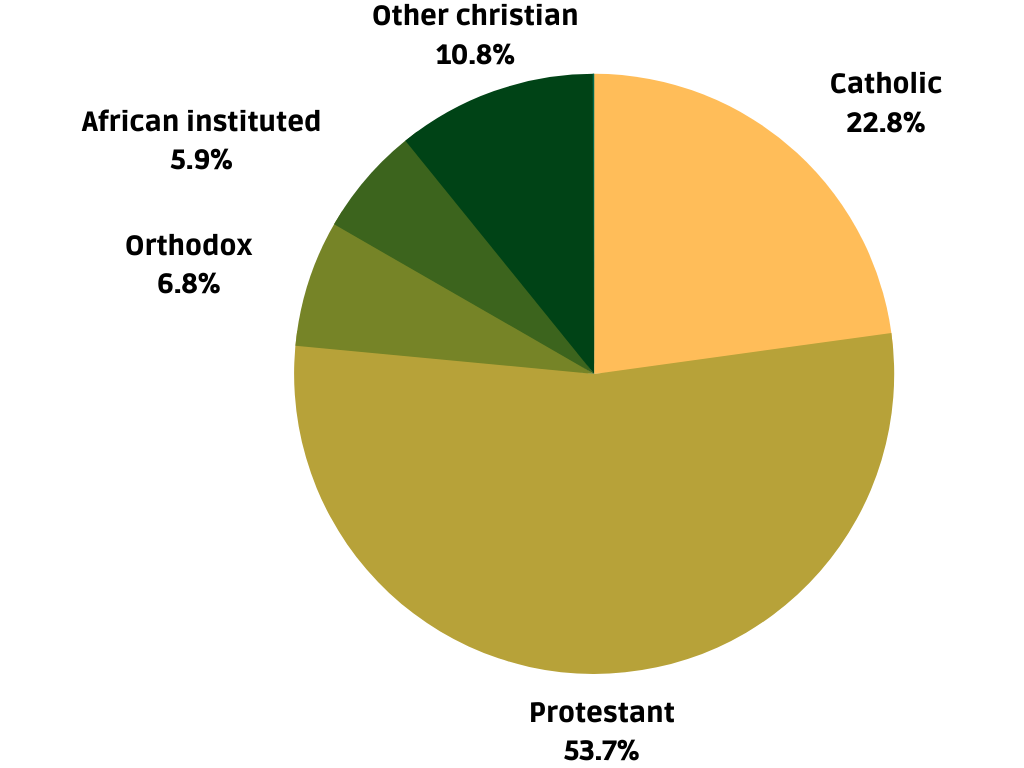
Christianity largest groups in Africa

Pew projected that 53% of Africa's population would be Christian in 2020. Estimates of Christians on the continent range up to eight hundred million.

=== Catholicism ===
==== Roman Catholic ====
Catholic Church membership rose from 2 million in 1900 to 140 million in 2000. In 2005, the Catholic Church in Africa, including Eastern Catholic Churches, was followed by approximately 135 million of the 809 million people in Africa. In 2009, when Pope Benedict XVI visited Africa, it was estimated at 158 million. Most belong to the Latin Church, but there are also millions of members of the Eastern Catholic Churches. As of 2024, the population stands at approximately 281 million, making Catholicism the largest Christian denomination in Africa.

=== Orthodoxy ===
==== Oriental Orthodoxy ====
- Ethiopian Orthodox Tewahedo Church – 47 million
- Coptic Orthodox Church of Alexandria – 15 million
- Eritrean Orthodox Tewahedo Church – 2 million

==== Eastern Orthodoxy ====
- Greek Orthodox Church of Alexandria – 1.3 million

=== Protestantism ===
In 2010, Pew estimated that there were around 300 million Protestants in Sub Saharan Africa. Other estimates range up to four hundred million. In 2015, Pew Research Centre noted that more than half of the Christians in sub-Saharan Africa were Protestants (including evangelicals). In 2012, Protestants had represented 35.9% of the Christian population of the continent. Studies have suggested there are an estimated two hundred million evangelicals in Africa. There are an estimated 60 million Anglicans and 23 million Lutherans in Africa. There are also approximately 29 million Baptists in Africa. Methodists number up to 25 million on the continent. Presbyterians in Africa are estimated to number more than twenty million. About 12 million Africans are Adventists and 19 million belong to United churches.

==== Anglicanism ====
- Church of Nigeria – 20.1 million
- Church of Uganda – 8.1 million
- Anglican Church of Kenya – 5.0 million
- Episcopal Church of South Sudan and Sudan – 4.5 million
- Anglican Church of Southern Africa – 2.3 million
- Anglican Church of Tanzania – 2.0 million
- Anglican Church of Rwanda – 1.0 million
- Church of the Province of Central Africa – 900,000
- Anglican Church of Burundi – 800,000
- Church of Christ in Congo–Anglican Community of Congo – 500,000
- Church of the Province of West Africa – 300,000
- Reformed Evangelical Anglican Church of South Africa – 90,000

==== Baptists ====
- Nigerian Baptist Convention – 5.0 million
- Baptist Union of Uganda – 2.5 million
- Baptist Community of Congo – 2.1 million
- Baptist Convention of Tanzania – 2.0 million
- Baptist Community of the Congo River – 1.1 million
- Baptist Convention of Kenya – 600,000
- Baptist Convention of Malawi – 300,000
- Ghana Baptist Convention – 300,000
- Union of Baptist Churches in Rwanda – 300,000
- Evangelical Baptist Church of the Central African Republic – 200,000

==== Catholic Apostolic Church (Irvingism) ====
- New Apostolic Church – 16 million

==== Lutheranism ====
Lutheranism in Africa represent 24.13 million people.

- Ethiopian Evangelical Church Mekane Yesus – 8.3 million
- Evangelical Lutheran Church in Tanzania – 6.5 million
- Malagasy Lutheran Church – 3.0 million
- The Lutheran Church of Christ in Nigeria – 2.2 million
- Evangelical Lutheran Church in Namibia – 700,000
- Evangelical Lutheran Church in Southern Africa – 600,000
- Evangelical Lutheran Church in the Republic of Namibia – 400,000
- Evangelical Lutheran Church of Cameroon – 300,000
- Evangelical Lutheran Church in Zimbabwe – 300,000

==== Methodism ====
With over 20 denominations in the continent, World Methodist Council has 17.08 million members in the whole continent.

- Methodist Church Nigeria – 2 million
- Methodist Church of Southern Africa – 1.7 million
- United Methodist Church of Ivory Coast – 1.08 million
- Methodist Church Ghana – 800,000
- Methodist Church in Kenya – 500,000
- The United Methodist Church in Liberia – 350,000
- Free Methodist church in Congo– 110,000

==== Reformed (Calvinism) ====
- Presbyterian Church of East Africa – 4.0 million
- Presbyterian Church of Nigeria – 3.8 million
- Presbyterian Church of Africa – 3.4 million
- Church of Christ in Congo–Presbyterian Community of Congo – 2.5 million
- Presbyterian Church of Cameroon – 1.8 million
- Church of Central Africa Presbyterian – 1.3 million
- Presbyterian Church in Sudan – 1.0 million
- Presbyterian Church in Cameroon – 700,000
- Evangelical Presbyterian Church, Ghana – 600,000
- Uniting Presbyterian Church in Southern Africa – 500,000
- Presbyterian Church in Rwanda – 300,000
- Church of Jesus Christ in Madagascar – 3.5 million
- United Church in Zambia – 3.0 million
- Evangelical Church of Cameroon – 2.5 million
- Dutch Reformed Church in South Africa (NGK) – 1.1 million
- Uniting Reformed Church in Southern Africa – 500,000
- Lesotho Evangelical Church – 300,000
- Christian Reformed Church of Nigeria – 300,000
- Reformed Church in Zambia – 300,000
- Evangelical Reformed Church in Angola – 200,000
- Church of Christ in the Sudan Among the Tiv – 200,000
- Evangelical Church of Congo – 200,000
- Evangelical Congregational Church in Angola – 900,000
- United Congregational Church of Southern Africa – 500,000

==== Pentecostalism ====
The population of Pentecostal Christians is around 202.29 million in 2015, being 35.32 percent of the continent's Christian population. A study estimated that there may be up to four hundred million Pentecostal and Charismatic Christians in Africa.

- Ethiopian Kale Heywet Church – 9 million
- Ethiopian Full Gospel Believers' Church – 4.5 million
- – 1 million
- General Council of the Assemblies of God Nigeria - 3.6 million
- Apostolic Faith Mission of South Africa – 1.2 million
- Association of Pentecostal Churches of Rwanda – 1 million

==== Mennonites ====
- Meserete Kristos Church – 470,000

==== Other evangelical groups ====
- Evangelical church of west africa – 5 million

=== Other Christian groups ===
There are approximately 97 million Christians in Africa independent from denominations. The Association of Religion Data Archives counts up to 128 million Christians independent from denominations.

==== African-initiated churches ====
60 million people are members of African-initiated churches.

- Zion Christian Church – 15 million
- Eternal Sacred Order of Cherubim and Seraphim – 10 million
- Kimbanguist Church – 5.5 million
- Redeemed Christian Church of God – 5 million
- Church of the Lord (Aladura) – 3.6 million
- Council of African Instituted Churches – 3 million
- Church of Christ Light of the Holy Spirit – 1.4 million
- African Church of the Holy Spirit – 700,000
- African Israel Church Nineveh – 500,000

==== Restorationism ====
- The Church of Jesus Christ of Latter-day Saints – 600,000

== Christian symbolism in Africa ==
=== National flags with a Christian symbolism ===
Flag of Burundi
(Saint Andrew's Cross)

Flag of the Canary Islands
(Latin cross)

Flag of Ceuta
(Five Holy Wounds)

Flag of Madeira
(Portuguese Cross)

=== Coat of arms with a Christian symbolism ===
Coat of arms of Benin
(Maltese cross)

Coat of arms of the Canary Islands
(Latin cross)

Coat of arms of Central Africa
(Maltese cross)

Coat of arms of Ceuta
(Five Holy Wounds)

Coat of arms of Chad
(Maltese cross)

Coat of arms of Madeira
(Portuguese Cross)

== See also ==
- African theology
- Afrikaner Calvinism
- Christianity and colonialism
- Christian mysticism in ancient Africa
- Roman Catholicism in Africa
- Traditional African religion
