= Christianity in Zimbabwe =

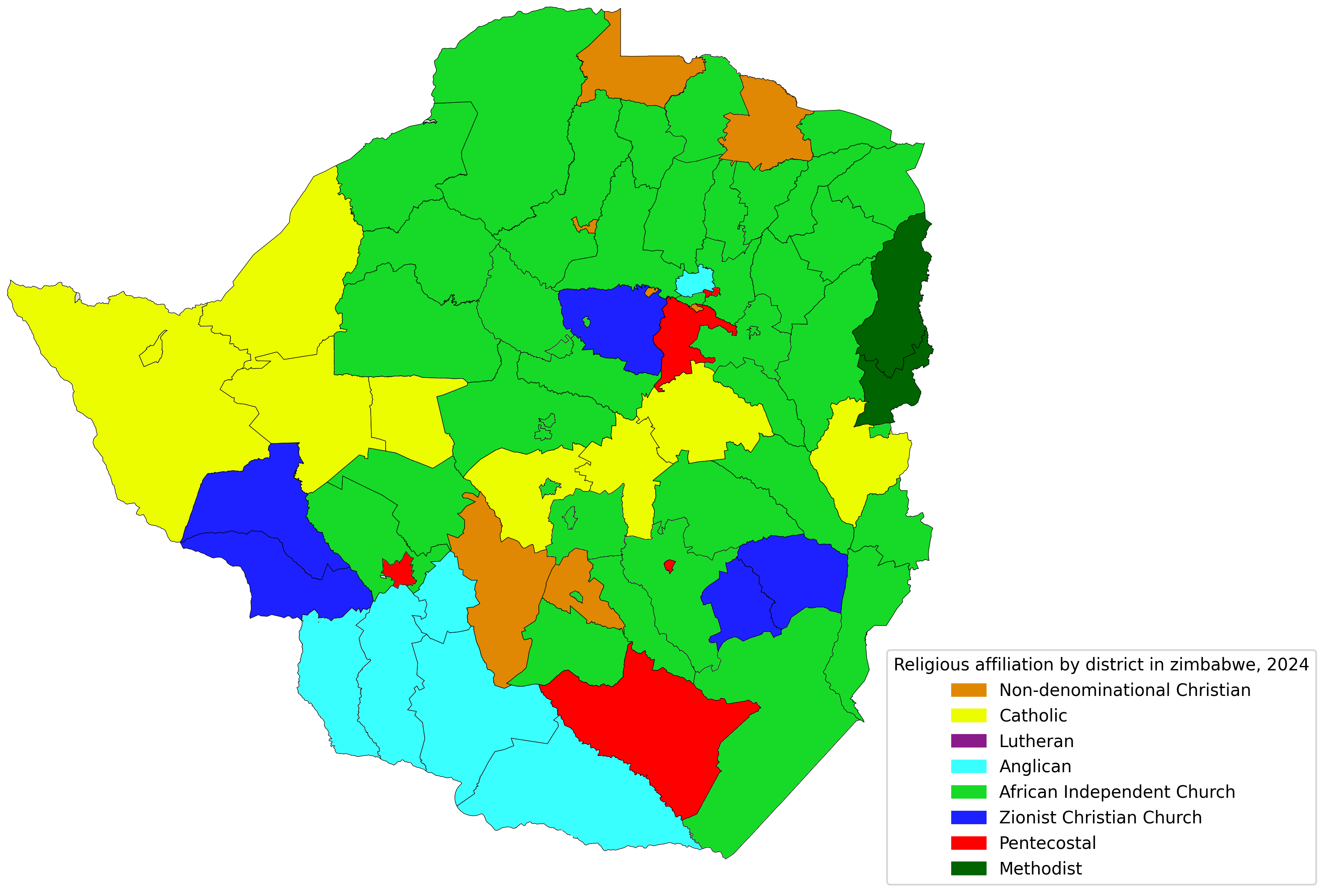
Largest Christian denomination by district in Zimbabwe according to a 2024 survey

Christianity is the largest religion practiced in Zimbabwe, accounted for more than 84% of the population. The arrival of Christianity dates back to the 16th century by Portuguese missionaries such as Fr. Gonsalo Da Silveira. Christianity is embraced by the majority of the population. It is estimated 85 percent of Zimbabweans claim to be Christians, with approximately 62 percent regularly attending church services. Christian faith plays a very important role in the organization of Zimbabwean society.

Heads of the Christian Denominations in Zimbabwe is an association made up of some of the common church bodies; the Zimbabwe Catholic Bishops' Conference, Evangelical Fellowship of Zimbabwe, and the Zimbabwe Council of Churches. However, recent years have seen a large increase in the number of new denominations, notably "Apostles" or "Mapostori". Most of these denominations derive their teachings from the Bible and attach greater emphasis on prophecy, demonstration of power, and fasting in the wilderness. Some reputable apostolic churches include Johane Masowe, Johane Marange, and Mugodhi, among others. Still, there are some "apostles who disregard the Bible and believe in messengers from God". There has been debate over the Western-formed churches, including Catholic and Anglican, over the truthfulness of the apostles' doctrine. While some apostles truly follow the Way of Christ, some violate bible principles through false prophecy. In addition, there has been a growing number of Christian ministries, including Prophetic Healing and Deliverance and United Family International Church, who are also criticized for overemphasizing the prosperity gospel and giving while increasing the wealth of the leaders.

== History ==
Catholic missionaries were the first to arrive in Zimbabwe. The first attempt to introduce Christianity to the Shona [tribe of Zimbabwe] was made by a Portuguese Jesuit missionary, Gonçalo da Silveira, at the court of the Monomotapa dynasty until he was murdered as a result of court intrigues in 1561. Although at least a dozen Catholic churches were planted, they all disappeared by 1667, when Portugal's power was waning, leaving "no discernible trace of Christianity." This remained the situation until the movement of Protestant missions arrived in the nineteenth century.

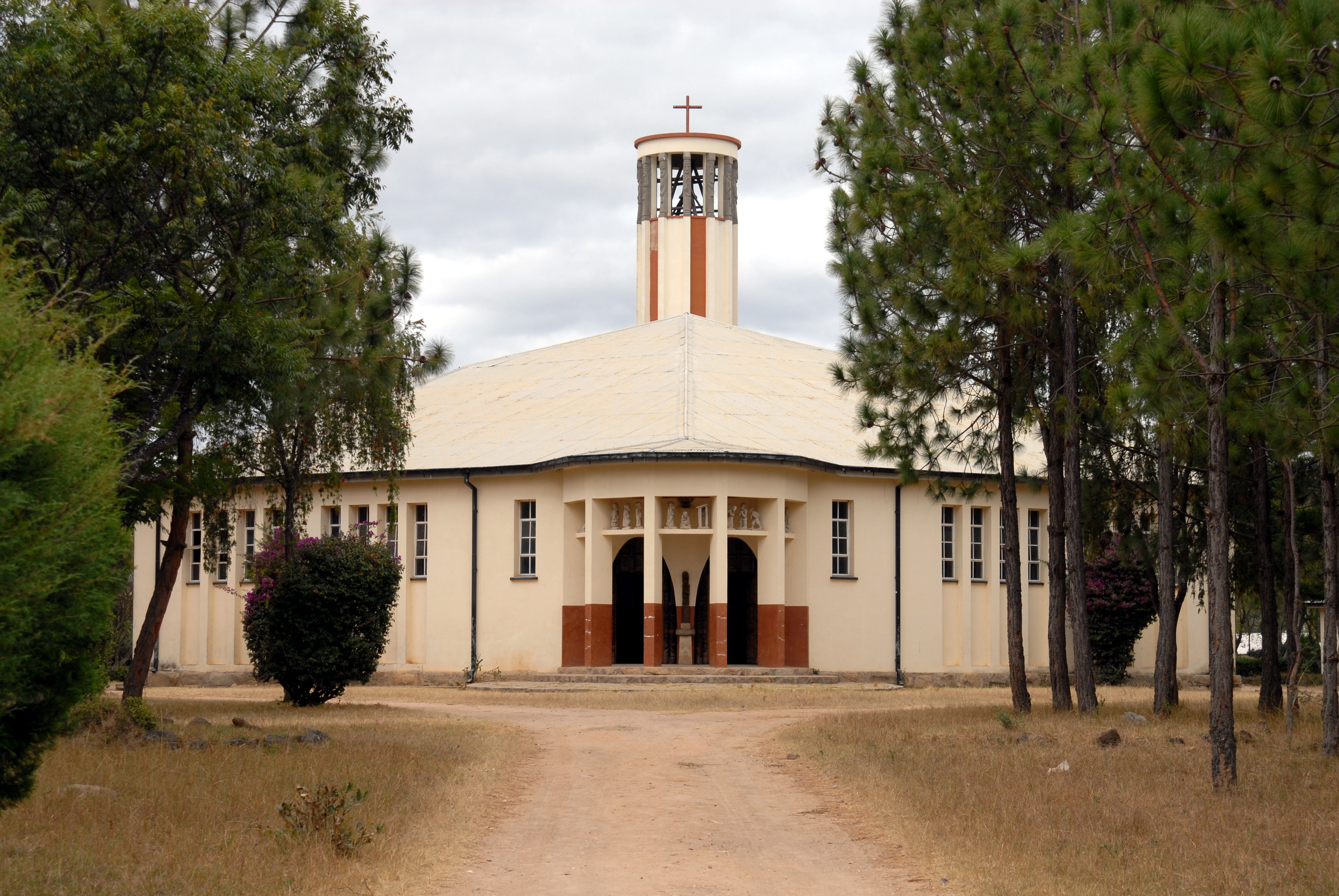
St Mary's Church, Serima Mission in Zimbabwe

In 1890 the 'Pioneer Column', Jesuit Catholic missionaries, and the Anglican Canon Belfour entered Lobengula's territory.

In 1799 Johannes Van der Kemp helped launch a missionary society called London Missionary Society (LMS). One of the LMS missionaries who helped launch Protestant missions into Zimbabwe was Robert Moffat and his wife Mary. One of Moffat's greatest accomplishments for missions in Zimbabwe was his friendship with Mzilikazi, king of the Ndebele tribe. Moffat's son-in-law David Livingstone had several expeditions in Zimbabwe around 1859. Another LMS missionary named Charles Daniel Helm founded the southern Rhodesia Missionary Conference. His sons Sam Helm and John Helm helped translate the New Testament of the Bible in the Karanga dialect of Shona, along with Andrew and Clini Louw of Dutch Reformed Mission Church. David Kingsley helped people understand the true meaning of churches. By 1918, they had finished the New Testament in four dialects: Ndau, Manyika, Zezuru, and Karanga. The Louws and some Sotho-speaking evangelists built various ministries in the region under Shona Reformed Church, but eventually they transferred all property to an indigenous church denomination called Reformed Church in Zimbabwe.

== Indigenous religious movements ==
- Andries Mtshede (d.1929) was a nephew of King Lobengula, who became a policeman and court interpreter and later a Methodist minister.
- Johane Marange (1912-1963) was a Zimbabwean Christian leader, prophet, and founder of the Apostolic Church of John Marange.
- Noah Taguta (1940-2002) was a Zimbabwean religious leader, High Priest farmer, evangelist, baptist, prophet who led Johane Marange from 1992 until 2002.
- NIMROD Taguta is a Zimbabwean religious leader and High Priest of Johane Marange from Mafararikwa in Mutare.
- First Ethiopian Church of Zimbabwe (1910). The Church was founded in 1910 by Charichidembo and Edison Nheya Gavhure. The Church is headquartered at Rumedzo in Bikita Masvingo. It is one of the early break-away Churches by black indigenous Zimbabweans.

== List of churches in Zimbabwe ==
- Johane Marange Apostolic Church
- Zimbabwe Assemblies of God Africa Forward in Faith Ministries International (ZAOGA FIFMI)
- Apostolic Faith Mission (AFM)
- Brethren in Christ Church
- Christ Embassy Church
- Evangelical Lutheran Church
- Uniting Presbytherian Church
- Presbyterian Church of Scotland
- Anglican Church
- African Methodist Episcopal Church
- New Life Covenant Church - Jabula Ministries
- Harvest House International (HHI)
- United Church of Christ in Zimbabwe (UCCZ)
- Celebration Ministries International
- Citadel of Power International Ministries (part of the International Fellowship of Christian Assemblies)
- Faith Ministries
- Catholic Church in Zimbabwe
- Church of Central Africa Presbyterian – Harare Synod
- Church of the Province of Central Africa part of the Anglican Communion
- Coptic Orthodox Church
- Eastern Orthodox Church
- Methodist in Zimbabwe
- Reformed Church In Zimbabwe - Dutch Reformed Church
- Seventh-day Adventist
- The Church of Jesus Christ of Latter-day Saints in Zimbabwe
- United Methodist Church
- United Congregational Church of Southern Africa ( UCCSA ) formerly London Missionary Society
- Presbatarian Church of Southern Africa
- I Word Of Life Ministries
- Apostles of God [Mupostori]
- Covenant Life Ministries International
- Living Flames Christian Centre
- Christ Connect Family Church (CCFC) Funded by Bishop Farai Katsande, who became a believer through ZAOGA, and was raised in faith by a prominent evangelist Abel Sande, who was a core founder of ZAOGA, who later founded
- Ambassadors for Christ International
- Pentecostal Assemblies of Zimbabwe
- In His Presence Ministries
- His Presence Ministries
- First Ethiopian Church of Zimbabwe (FEC) - Founded in 1910 and led by Bishops Charichidembo (1910-1942) and Bishop Edson Nheya Gavhure (1943 - 1984). Bishop Ishmael Nheya Gavhure took over the leadership from 1985 till 2016. Currently the Church is led by Bishop Albert Gavhure since 2017.

== See also ==
- Christian Mysticism in Ancient Africa
- Christianity by country
- Religion in Zimbabwe
