= Santenay =

Santenay may refer to:

== Places ==
- Santenay, Côte-d'Or, France
- Santenay, Loir-et-Cher, France

== Other uses ==
- Santenay AOC, a wine classification
- Ensemble Santenay, a German early music ensemble
