= Santenay wine =

French wine

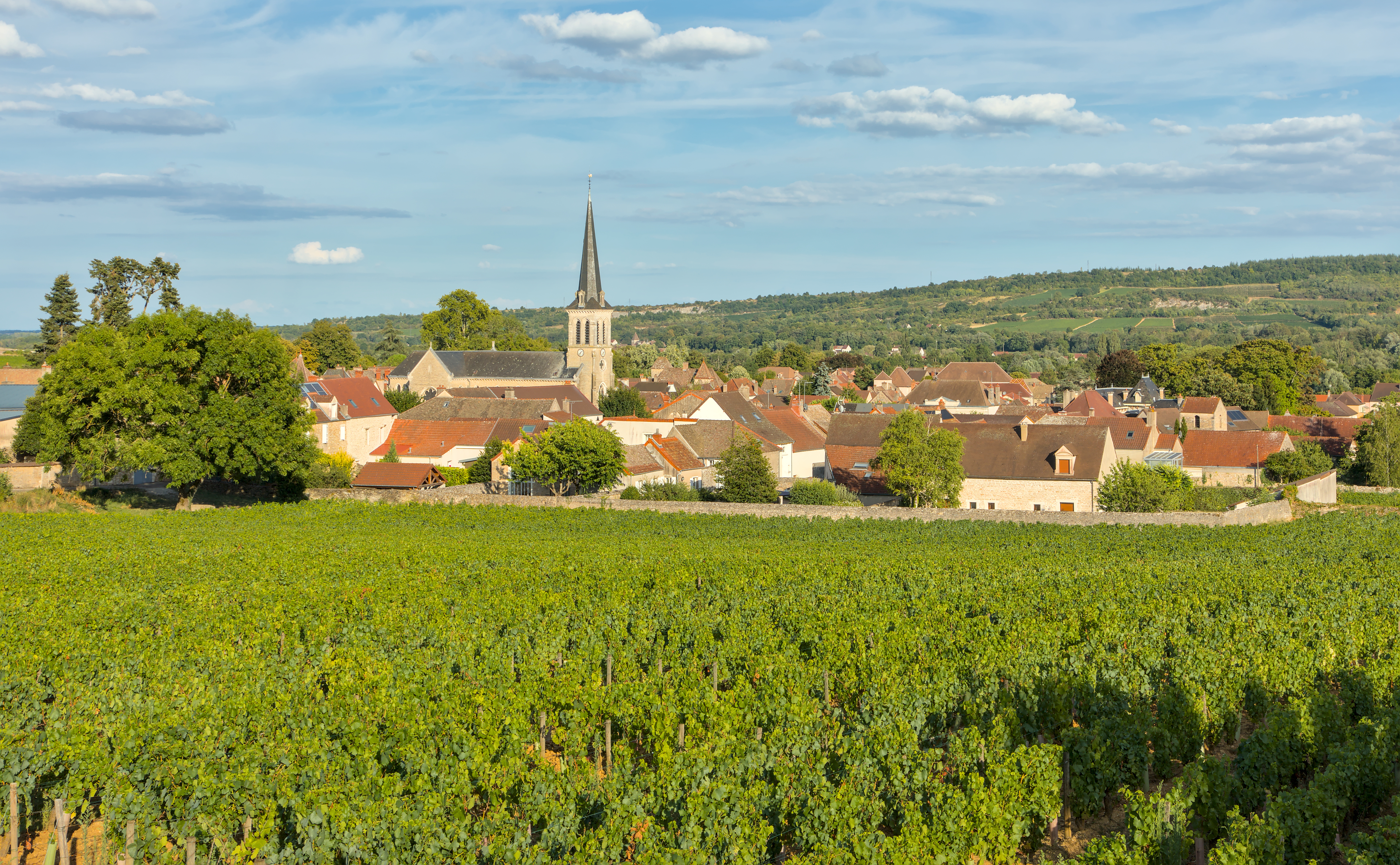
Vineyards in Santenay, with the village in the background.

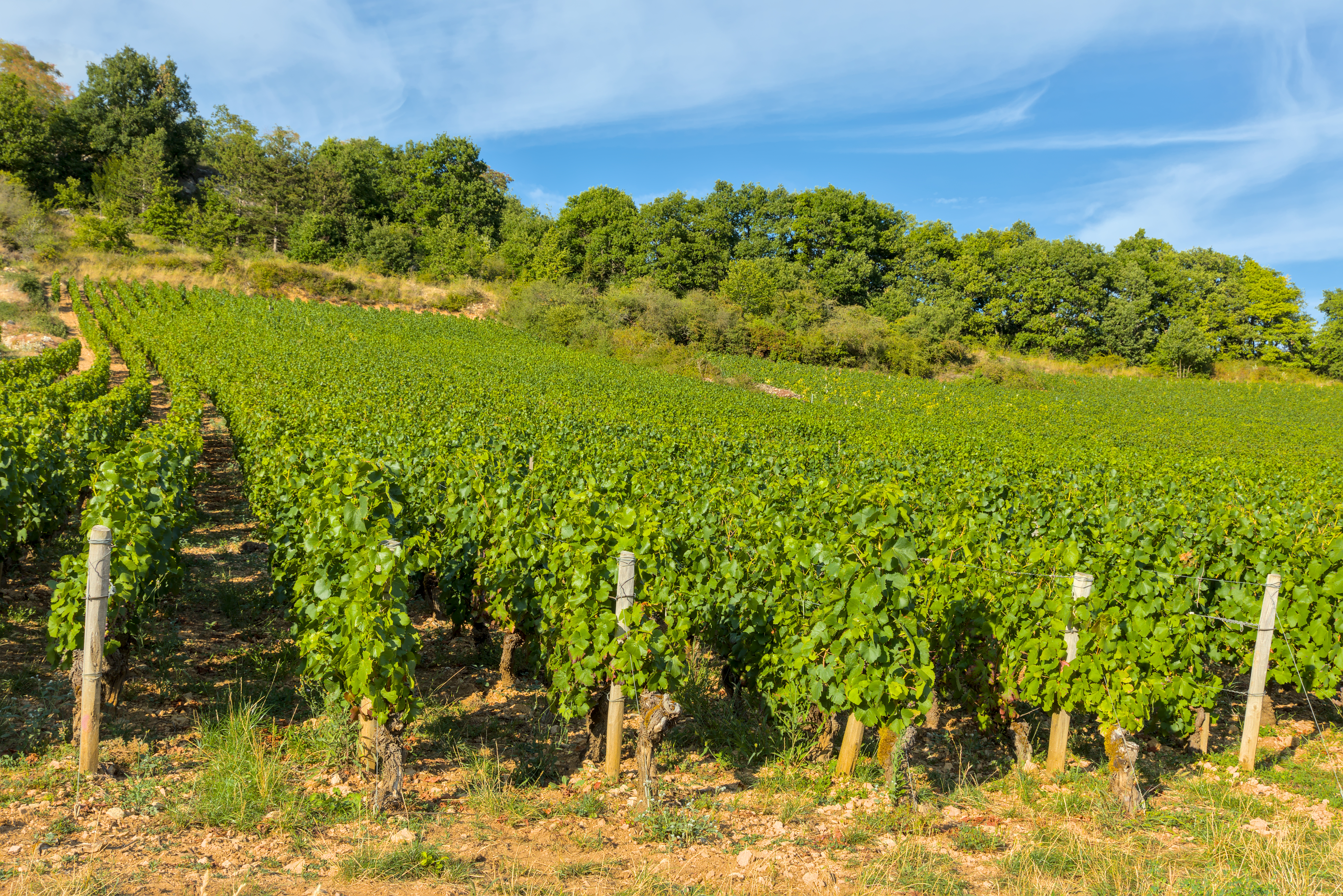
A Santenay vineyard in August.

Santenay wine is produced in the communes of Santenay and Remigny in Côte de Beaune of Burgundy. The Appellation d'origine contrôlée (AOC) Santenay may be used for red and white wine with respectively Pinot noir and Chardonnay as the main grape variety. The production consists of almost 85% red wine, and a little over 15% of white wine. There are no Grand Cru vineyards within the Santenay AOC.

In 2008, there were 329.31 hectares (813.7 acres) of vineyard surface in production for Santenay wine at village and Premier Cru level, and 14,040 hectoliters of wine was produced, of which 11,719 hectoliters were red and 2,321 hectoliters were white. Some 283.43 hectares (700.4 acres) of this area was used for the red wines in 2007. The total amount produced corresponds to almost 1.9 million bottles, of which over 1.5 million bottles were red wine and just over 300,000 bottles were white wine.

For white wines, the AOC regulations allow both Chardonnay and Pinot blanc to be used, but most wines are 100% Chardonnay. The AOC regulations also allow up to 15 per cent total of Chardonnay, Pinot blanc and Pinot gris as accessory grapes in the red wines, but this not very often practiced. The allowed base yield is 40 hectoliters per hectare of red wine and 45 hectoliters per hectare for white wine. The grapes must reach a maturity of at least 10.5 per cent potential alcohol for village-level red wine, 11.0 per cent for village-level white wine and Premier Cru red wine, and 11.5 per cent for Premier Cru white wine.

== Premiers Crus ==
There are 12 climats in Santenay classified as Premier Cru vineyards, located in three different parts of the commune of Santenay. (There are no Premier Cru vineyards within Remigny.) Some of these climats are located in the west, in the direction of Dezize-lès-Maranges (a commune which produces Maranges wine), some are located in the middle of the commune, just uphill from the village of Santenay, and some are located in the northeast, close to the border of Chassagne-Montrachet, and forming a continuous band of Premier Cru vineyards with those in that commune.

The wines of these vineyards are designated Santenay Premier Cru + vineyard name, or may labelled just Santenay Premier Cru, in which case it is possible to blend wine from several Premier Cru vineyards within the AOC.

In 2007, 130.02 hectares (321.3 acres) of the total Santenay vineyard surface consisted of Premier Cru vineyards, of which 110.12 hectares (272.1 acres) red and 12.90 hectares (31.9 acres) white Santenay Premier Cru. The annual production of Premier Cru wine, as a five-year average, is 4,238 hectoliters of red wine and 607 hectoliters of white wine.

The climats classified as Premiers Crus are:

- La Comme
- Les Gravières
- Clos de Tavannes
- Beauregard
- Clos Faubard
- Clos des Mouches
- Beaurepaire
- Passetemps
- La Maladière
- Grand Clos Rousseau
- Clos Rousseau
