= Apostles of Johane Maranke =

Political movement

Apostles of Johane Marange is an African Initiated Church movement that was started by Johane Marange (1912–1963) in Southern Rhodesia in 1932. The "Apostolic Church of John Marange" (as it is officially called) numbers over 300,000 adherents in five African nations, in Zambia (Zimbabwe's northern neighbour) they are called or known as Golegole. It is one of the largest movements in the Zionist churches of Africa. The Zionists take on some symbols and practices of Judaism as well as emphasizing faith healing and prophecy. The Apostles of Johane Maranke forbid pork, alcohol, tobacco, and both African and Western medicine. The Star of David is on some of their religious garments. The church is pacifist.

At their services, men sit on the east side and women on the west side. Women are believed to have healing powers. All services are performed outside.

Initiation into the church is through water baptism, usually in pools of running water in rivers and streams. In urban environments, the practice has been restricted as many streams and rivers in urban vicinities are polluted by industrial or domestic effluent. On baptism, the convert is given a new name (usually a Hebrew or biblical one) by a prophet which name he will be called by from thence. After a verbal catechism on the dos and don'ts the convert is allowed to be adorned in the church's regalia. For male converts this consists of an ankle-length white robe; a white undercloth; and a long staff, usually with a loop on the upright end. From then all males are required to shave their heads and keep a goatee permanently. For women, it consists of an ankle-length white robe and a long head veil worn backwards and wide enough to be wrapped around the body like a cloak. The veil is marked by a long red stripe that runs its full length in the centre. Although they use the whole Bible for preaching and instruction, most of the church's doctrines are Jewish and Old Testament oriented.
