= Merengue =

Merengue may refer to:

- Merengue music, a musical genre which originated in the Dominican Republic
  - Merengue (dance), a dance form
  - Merengue típico, a regional variety of merengue popular in the Cibao valley of the Dominican Republic
- Venezuelan merengue
- An adjective referring to the Real Madrid football club
- An adjective referring to Club Universitario de Deportes
- Merengue (band), a Japanese rock band
- "Merengue", a song by American rapper Kent Jones

== See also ==
- Meringue, a type of French dessert (which is spelled merengue in Spanish)
- Méringue, a musical genre native to Haiti
