= Johane Maranke =

Zimbabwean apostolic leader (1912–1963)

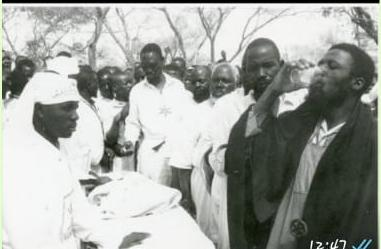
Judah Momberume (wearing a duke on a Paska)

John or Johane Marange (also Johane Marange; 1912–1963) was a Zimbabwean apostolic leader, prophet, and founder of the Apostles of Johane Marange.

== Early life ==
He was born Muchabaya Momberume near Bondwe Mountain in the Marange Tribal Trustland of Southern Rhodesia in 1912. He had brothers named Anorodi and Konoriyo. When he was 20, he established John Marange Apostle Church starting in Marange area, then the rest of colonial Rhodesia and into neighbouring countries.

== Ministry ==
In 1932, when Marange was 20, he returned from journeys in the bush announcing a series of visions and encounters with Jesus Christ, consequently becoming a Holy Spirit guided itinerant preacher bearing the name Johane, with a mission to establish a new African church. In his visions he was decreed to baptize people and observe the [Saturday] Sabbath (Sabata In Shona). Marange founded the largest independent church in Central Africa. The main gathering of the church occurred at Passover feast named PASKA at Marange's village, lasting for seventeen days, and ending with communion.

== See also ==
- Christianity in Zimbabwe
