= Cheilly-lès-Maranges =

- Commune
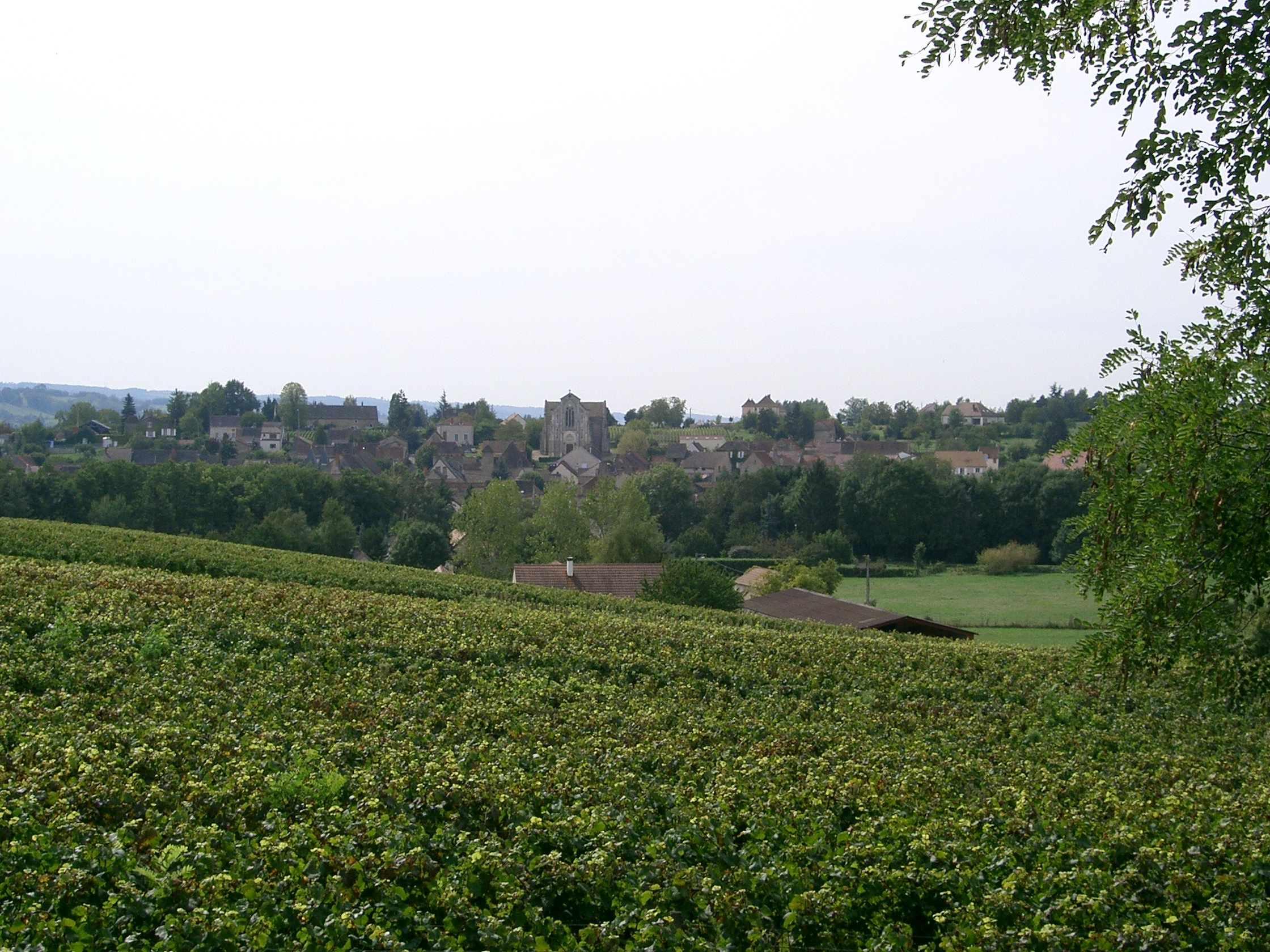
- A general view of Cheilly-lès-Maranges

- Coat of arms
- Location of Cheilly-lès-Maranges
- Location within France Location within Bourgogne-Franche-Comté
- Coordinates: 46°53′46″N 4°40′18″E
- Country: France
- Region: Bourgogne-Franche-Comté
- Department: Saône-et-Loire
- Arrondissement: Chalon-sur-Saône
- Canton: Chagny
- Intercommunality: CA Le Grand Chalon
- Area^{1}: 7 km^{2} (2.7 sq mi)
- Elevation: 216 m (709 ft)
- Highest elevation: 400 m (1,300 ft)
- Lowest elevation: 216 m (709 ft)
- Population (2023): 515
  - Density: 74/km^{2} (190/sq mi)
- Time zone: UTC+01:00 (CET)
  - Summer (DST): UTC+02:00 (CEST)
- INSEE/Postal code: 71122 /71150
- ^{1} French Land Register data, which excludes lakes, ponds, glaciers > 1 km^{2} (0.386 sq mi or 247 acres) and river estuaries.

Cheilly-lès-Maranges is a commune in the Saône-et-Loire department in the region of Bourgogne-Franche-Comté in eastern France.

== Wine ==
The vineyards of Cheilly-lès-Maranges is included in the Maranges wine appellation.

== See also ==
- Communes of the Saône-et-Loire department
