= Maranges wine =

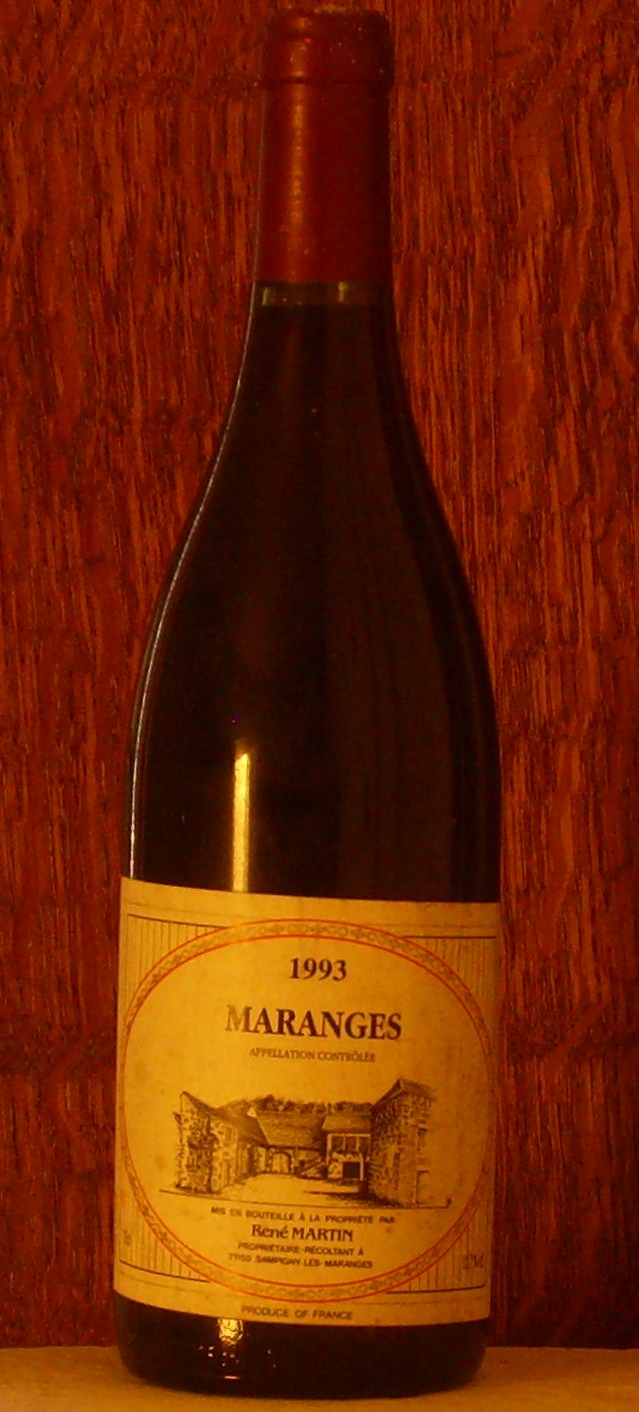
A bottle of Maranges wine.

Maranges wine (French pronunciation: [maʁɑ̃ʒ]) is produced in the communes of Cheilly-lès-Maranges, Dezize-lès-Maranges and Sampigny-lès-Maranges in Côte de Beaune of Burgundy. The Appellation d'origine contrôlée (AOC) Maranges may be used for red and white wine with respectively Pinot noir and Chardonnay as the main grape variety. The production consists of around 95% red wine and 5% white wine. There are no Grand Cru vineyards within the Maranges AOC.

In 2008, there were 170.82 hectares (422.1 acres) of vineyard surface in production for Maranges wine at village and Premier Cru level, and 7,449 hectoliter of wine was produced, of which 7,073 hectoliter red wine and 376 hectoliter white wine. The total amount produced corresponds to almost 1 million bottles, of which over 900.000 bottles of red wine and around 50.000 bottles of white wine.

For white wines, the AOC regulations allow both Chardonnay and Pinot blanc to be used, but most wines are 100% Chardonnay. The AOC regulations also allow up to 15 per cent total of Chardonnay, Pinot blanc and Pinot gris as accessory grapes in the red wines, but this not very often practiced. The allowed base yield is 40 hectoliter per hectare of red wine and 45 hectoliter per hectare for white wine. The grapes must reach a maturity of at least 10.5 per cent potential alcohol for village-level red wine, 11.0 per cent for village-level white wine and Premier Cru red wine, and 11.5 per cent for Premier Cru white wine.

== Premiers Crus ==
There are seven climats in Maranges classified as Premier Cru vineyards. Their wines are designated Maranges Premier Cru + vineyard name, or may labelled just Maranges Premier Cru, in which case it is possible to blend wine from several Premier Cru vineyards within the AOC.

In 2007, 130.02 hectares (321.3 acres) of the total Maranges vineyard surface consisted of Premier Cru vineyards, of which 79.13 hectares (195.5 acres) red and 2.89 hectares (7.1 acres) white Maranges Premier Cru. The annual production of Premier Cru wine, as a five-year average, is 3,331 hectoliters of red wine and 76 hectoliters of white wine.

The climats classified as Premiers Crus are:

- In Cheilly-lès-Maranges: Les Clos Roussots, La Fussière, and Clos de la Boutière.
- In Dezize-lès-Maranges: La Fussière, Clos de la Fussière, and La Croix aux Moines.
- In Sampigny-lès-Maranges: Les Clos Roussots, Le Clos des Rois, and Le Clos des Loyères.
