= African Israel Church Nineveh =

Christian church in Kenya

Coordinates: 0.0154°N 34.7593°E

The African Israel Church Nineveh is one of the largest African Initiated Churches in Kenya. The Church was founded by David Zakayo Kivuli, who belonged to a small clan which though integrated into Bantu society was Nilotic in origin, being on the border of Luo and Luhya territory. He grew up being friends to all and speaking Nandi and Luo as well as his native Maragoli. The church has thus been able to draw membership from both Luo and Luhya. Today the AINC followers are found in every large town in Kenya. Though the majority are members from two tribes, the Luhya and the Luo, the church has spread among many other tribes in the country. It has small communities in the US and the UK.

== History ==
=== The background of David Zakayo Kivuli ===
Some 'freelance' Pentecostal missionaries had been working at Nyang'ori, on the border of the Luo and Luhya territory since 1919, and this work gained increased impetus with the arrival of the Pentecostal Mission from Canada in 1924. The Pentecostals preached a simple message of individual salvation with a moment of conversion with a subsequent 'receiving of the Spirit'.

David Zakayo Kivuli was born about 1896 and came from a polygamous family living at Gimarakwa, only four miles from Nyang'ori. He enrolled at Nyang'ori mission school during the First World War (in 1914) in order to avoid enlistment into the Carrier Corps. He was later employed on a settler's farm, where he worked hard and married in 1921, and for the next four years worked as a labourer in various parts of Kenya. This varied experience, together with some further education at the Jeanes School at Kabete (Nairobi), gave him a broad outlook which reached beyond tribal limitations, and a considerable knowledge, if also some suspicions, of European ways and thought.

Kivuli returned to study at the Pentecostal mission in Nyang'ori, where he was baptised in 1925. In 1929 he was made mission supervisor of schools. He returned for a short course at Kabete in 1931. Late in 1931 he fell ill and following this illness was converted. He was thought to have begun to prophesy and speak in tongues and performed miraculous cures. Many signs and wonders were attested to have occurred, and his confession of sins and worship in public places which contradicted the teachings of the missionaries made it clear that he was not operating under the Pentecostal Church.

David Kivuli died in 1974 and is buried in a mausoleum in his family compound next to the headquarters in Nineveh.

=== A calling like St Paul's ===
On 6 February 1932 he became convinced for the first time that he was a sinner needing salvation, and on 12 February received the Spirit. While singing in his house something lifted him up and threw him on the ground, and he became temporarily blind. That night he began to speak with tongues, and the whole house was filled with light, but he remained blind for 16 days, and couldn't eat for 12 days. During that time, he heard a voice like thunder and God commanded him not to shave his beard and to take the name of Paul.

When he recovered, he had lost interest in teaching children and wanted to preach the Word of God, which he did by going from village to village, singing and converting people. He prayed for the sick and they were healed. He was also joined by a group of Luo Anglicans who had received the spirit and been expelled from the church. The leader of this group, Filemona Orwa, became a great friend of Kivuli's. Kivuli was well respected both by the church and the government locally.

During this time, he had the confidence of both secular and ecclesiastical authorities. From 1937 to 1943 he was a member of the Location Council, a position of some public responsibility. From 1936 he was Chairman of the African Church Committee of the Pentecostal mission, and from 1939, an authorised evangelist Ogot.

The supernatural origin of his mission is also associated with a large rock near his home. One day in 1941 while he and some followers were singing and praying, water came out of the rock. The same happened the next day. This confirmed his calling. For many years he was ministering within his mother church.

Eventually he decided to form his own church and the separation from the Pentecostals was achieved without bitterness on either side. It started with about 150 members. Kivuli and his followers established a good reputation of being people who were 'loyal and harmless, pay taxes promptly, and are amenable to discipline'.

=== The founding of the new church ===
The new church was thus founded on 1 January 1942 out of the Pentecostal Assemblies of Canada at Nyang'ori. It was initially called Huru Salvation Nineveh (Free Salvation Nineveh) but later became the African Israel Church Nineveh. Kivuli, High Priest Zakayo & Isaac Ajega (1962) The African Israel Church History presented at the Mindolo Consultation on African Independent Churches in 1962 points out that the church is called African not to be exclusive of other races, but to show that it was "first founded, performed, ministered in Africa." Israel has the meaning of 'soldier of God' daily struggling against the enemy, and also 'God's plan of Salvation'. It is called Nineveh because as the people of Nineveh repented, so the members are taught to repent and flee from the wickedness and evils of this world.

The church grew slowly in the first five years, but from 1949 the membership started to pick up. Kivuli was able to preach in both Abaluhya and Dhluo so the church grew among both tribes.

=== A distinctive church ===
Polygamy was accepted at the time of entering the church, but a member was not allowed to take more wives. Women, who outnumbered men two to one, were given an important place in the church.

It is customary for both men and women members to process to church in ankle length white dresses, accompanied with a flag and drum. "The practice of wearing long garments or gowns with head kerchiefs and turbans on the head of all, both females and males, is the indication that in Heaven we do not have sexual differences or physical bodies but we are all in the form of spiritual body, that immortal body of God; And as the Old Testament was the picture of shadow of the New Testament, so the wearing by Israel adherents of almost the same and undistinguished dresses of both the body and the head is the shadow of the heavenly uniform."

Immediately the church was founded the flag was introduced. It indicates that the soldiers of the cross must have a national flag to show their regiment wherever they are. The flag is green, white and red, representing the three major races of the world, Africans, Whites and Asians. It also represents the Godhead of Father, Son and Holy Spirit. It is used on parades outside the church. These processions are to fish for sinners, thus fulfilling the Lord's command to go out and preach the gospel to every creature.

They sing and dance as they go in public witness to their faith. The services are spontaneous with the leader very much in charge, and they follow a general pattern of prayer, exhortation, much noisy singing, and public confession leading to possession. Spiritual healing is common, and dreams are regarded as an important part of revelation.

Prophecy is also very important. "The church believes strongly that all the people of God are spiritually inspired and that there are prophets, who can directly communicate with God in Spirit and to interpret the visions to the people. That this is true means, God approaches or sends his wonderful message to his people, to reform his relationship of his glory to men of the world." Dreams likewise have a very important place, as they do in tribal tradition to the extent that Kivuli states: "I am convinced that the only way in which God speaks to his children is through dreams. There must be a biblical parallel. Otherwise, the dream is not from God. But nothing important happens in the world which is not revealed to God's prophets." (Quoted in Welbourn, 1966). It is important however to note the need for objectivity, through the scriptures, recognised by Kivuli, though not necessarily recognised by the rank-and-file members.

=== A growing church ===
The church grew rapidly among the Luo and Luhya of western Kenya and spread into neighbouring Tanzania and Uganda. By 1970, Kivuli led perhaps 100,000 followers; his church had one hundred branches and was accepted as a probationary member of the National Christian Council of Kenya.

AICN is now spread across Kenya, and by 1973 was administered through 23 ministries under ministers (21 being in Kenya), with in turn 68 Pastorates each with a Pastor and 274 churches. Kivuli died in 1974; in 1975 the Africa Israel Church Nineveh became an associate member church of the World Council of Churches. AICN is an active member of the World Council of Churches, All Africa Council of Churches and the Organisation of African Instituted Churches (OAIC).

The local congregations have considerable autonomy, while having a strong bond of loyalty to the centre and the leader. There is a strong moral obligation to pay an annual subscription which helps maintain the centre at Nineveh.

Keen members are expected to attend church twice a week. On Fridays the service is for full members and is essentially one of confession and purification. The Sunday service is one of thanksgiving for redemption into the saved community, and nonmembers are encouraged to come and join in.

=== Divisions and new churches ===
AICN has suffered from many divisions from it over the years. In 1950 the Muolo Roho Israel Church, founded by Bishop Yona Atiang, split form the AICN over food taboos. The bishop and his deputy inform the congregations concerning prohibited meats. Muolo means peacefulness in Dholuo.

The Muolo Roho Israel Church has removed the physical from sacraments. Baptism does not involve the use of water but is effected by the sign of the cross, and an anointing oil is added to the ceremony. Holy Communion is celebrated with a scripture reading, no food being necessary since Jesus already gave his body on the cross for the faithful.

A second split forming the Roho Israel Church of God took place in 1963. In 1960, the founder, Mr James Kasibo, who was formerly of the Pentecostal Assemblies of God and later of AICN, had a serious illness accompanied by a vision. As a result he led a 'reform Israel' movement of AICN and formed a church which was first known as African Spiritual Israel Church, then World Spiritual Israel Church (Roho Mtakatifu Israel Church and Schools). From 1966 it has been known as Roho Israel Church of God.

In 1962, Mr Paul Omumbo Achola split from the AICN, and eventually in 1970 set up his own body under Luo leadership, supported generously from his own resources. The church is called New Roho Israel Church (Manyien). Manyien mean 'New' in Dhluo.

In 1965 an independent group of Luo and Luhya members split off from the RICG in a dispute over leadership to form the East African Church Roho Israel. Its headquarters is at Ahero.

Also in 1965, Bishop Paulo Masambu led a split from AICN, to form the Sinai Church of East Africa, stressing the need for more educated leadership training. In 1971 it had only grown slowly with 300 Luhya and 50 Kikuyu members (Barrett et al., 1973).

Another schism in 1965 from the AICN led by Rev Stephen John Khaguli in dispute over leadership led in 1966 to the registration of the Three Holiness Church of Kenya, but its registration was cancelled in 1970.

== Church structure ==
In the AINC the spouse of every church leader is co-leader and the two are ordained together. The administrative and spiritual line begins with the church elder in every local church, a pastor in charge of a pastorate, a senior minister in charge of a centre, a chief minister in charge of a region or division, a moderator or missionary bishop in charge of a central regional office or province, a national bishop in charge of a country and the archbishop as the spiritual head.

=== Headquarters ===
The Headquarters is at Jebrok in Hamisi Constituency in Western Province, Kenya. The spiritual head of the church resides at Nineveh headquarters where a large church was built in 1958, called Safina or "The Ark". When David Kivuli died in 1974 he was succeeded as spiritual head by the high priestess Mama Rebecca Kivuli, who retired in 1983. The present Archbishop is David Kivuli’s grandson, Archbishop John Kivuli II.

=== Church departments and educational activities ===
At the beginning, the AINC faced many difficulties as an independent church in Kenya. Now it operates more than thirty primary schools and sixty nursery schools. Various women's groups are responsible for education in home economics and handicraft.

The church has various departments and programmes catering for the needs of the youth, recreational activities, women, men, small-scale businesses, mission, evangelism, health, development, legal and human resources, HIV/AIDS programmes, education, counselling services, etc.

== Doctrine and beliefs ==
The AINC holds the Trinitarian doctrine, and believes in the second coming of Jesus Christ and his final judgment. The church does not practise infant baptism. Infants are dedicated on their eighth day by the local pastor and given Christian names by their parents or guardians. Adult baptism is done after attending baptism classes for three months. It is considered as baptism of the Spirit and is done without water. This does not imply that water as a means of baptism is bad or prohibited. The AINC offers opportunities for water baptism to any member who asks for it.

=== Holy days ===
In the tradition of the AINC, Friday is the day for repentance and is also celebrated as the holy day when the church remembers the death of Jesus Christ on the cross and his forgiveness of sins. Long sessions of prayer and meditation take place on this day.

Sunday is also a holy day, mostly celebrated by processions.

=== Ethics ===
In the realm of Christian ethics, all members are expected to practice monogamy, abstinence from alcohol and tobacco, and adopt simple styles of dress.

=== Distinctive practices ===
Kitagawa (1962) lists four points on which he says the AICN has deviated from Protestant orthodoxy:

- The weekly day of worship is Friday, while Sunday is the day of preaching outside of the Church.
- Rejection of water in baptism for fear the use of water leads to formalism at the expense of the part played by the Holy Spirit.
- Rejection of Holy Communion, and sole emphasis on repentance as the mark of salvation.
- Baptism of the polygamously married converts without their forsaking the second wife.

These four points, therefore, probably give a clear idea of some of the issues missionaries can learn from the churches and how they themselves are perceived.
