= Marange-Zondrange =

- Commune
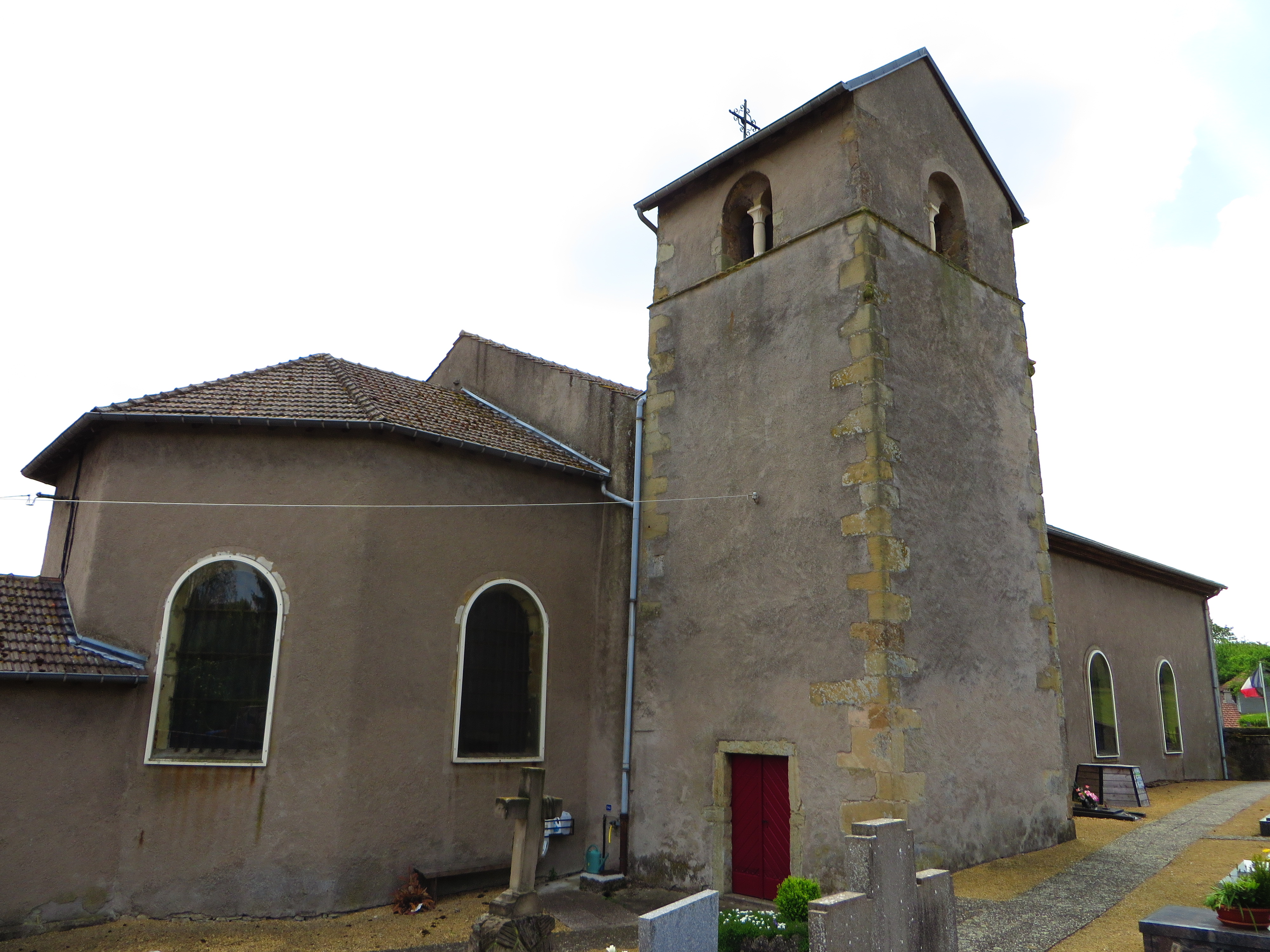
- The church in Marange-Zondrange

- Coat of arms
- Location of Marange-Zondrange
- Location within France Location within Grand Est
- Coordinates: 49°06′44″N 6°32′18″E
- Country: France
- Region: Grand Est
- Department: Moselle
- Arrondissement: Forbach-Boulay-Moselle
- Canton: Faulquemont
- Intercommunality: District Urbain de Faulquemont

Government
  - Mayor (2022–2026): Nicolas Hinz
- Area^{1}: 8.28 km^{2} (3.20 sq mi)
- Elevation: 251 m (823 ft)
- Highest elevation: 374 m (1,227 ft)
- Lowest elevation: 239 m (784 ft)
- Population (2023): 372
  - Density: 44.9/km^{2} (116/sq mi)
- Time zone: UTC+01:00 (CET)
  - Summer (DST): UTC+02:00 (CEST)
- INSEE/Postal code: 57444 /57690
- ^{1} French Land Register data, which excludes lakes, ponds, glaciers > 1 km^{2} (0.386 sq mi or 247 acres) and river estuaries.

Marange-Zondrange (French pronunciation: [maʁɑ̃ʒ zɔ̃dʁɑ̃ʒ]; German: Möhringen-Zondringen; Lorraine Franconian Mëringen-Sonneringen) is a commune in the Moselle department in Grand Est in north-eastern France.

== See also ==
- Communes of the Moselle department
