= Sampigny-lès-Maranges =

- Commune
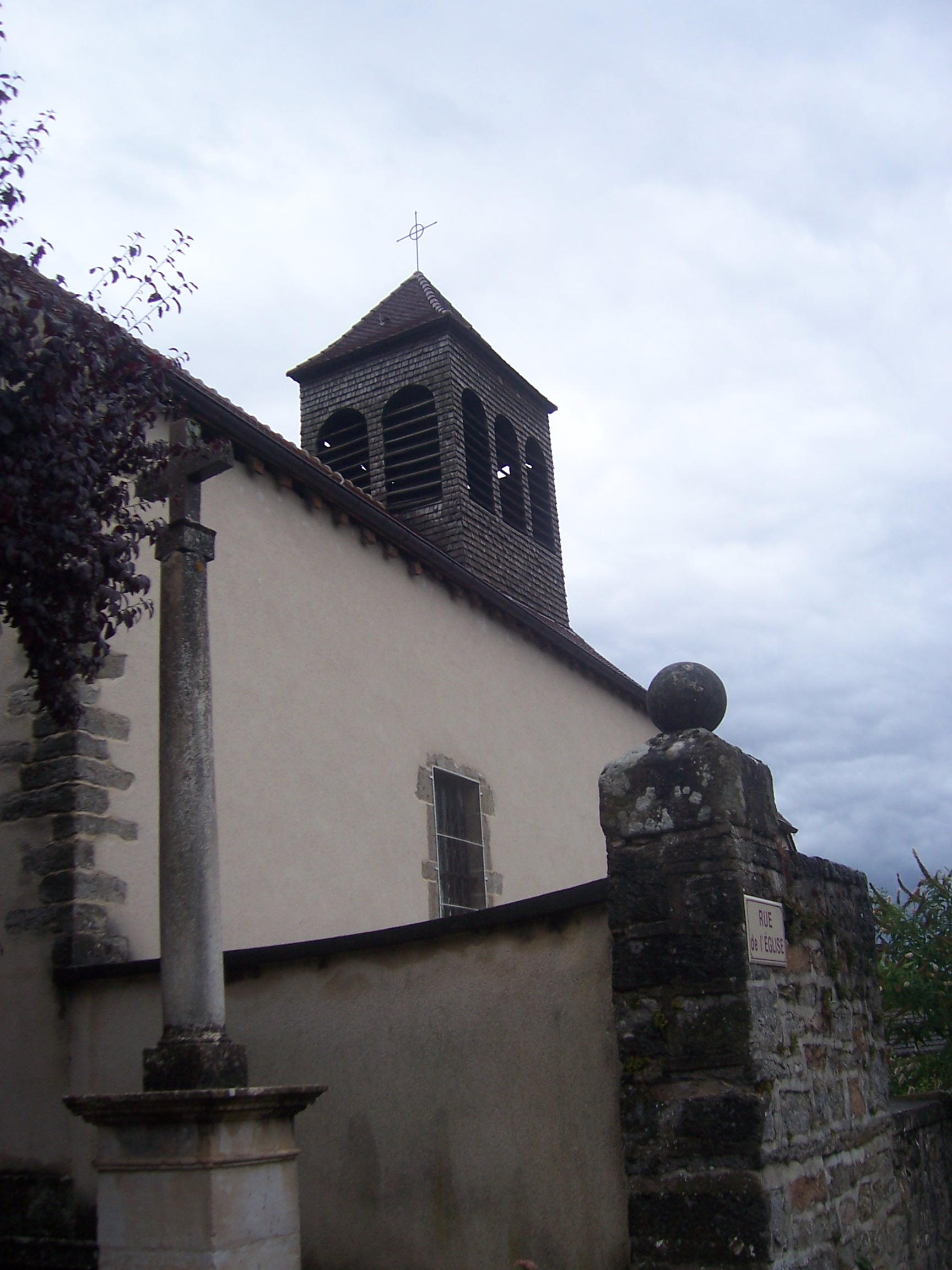
- The church in Sampigny-lès-Maranges

- Coat of arms
- Location of Sampigny-lès-Maranges
- Location within France Location within Bourgogne-Franche-Comté
- Coordinates: 46°54′23″N 4°39′13″E
- Country: France
- Region: Bourgogne-Franche-Comté
- Department: Saône-et-Loire
- Arrondissement: Chalon-sur-Saône
- Canton: Chagny
- Intercommunality: CA Le Grand Chalon
- Area^{1}: 2.7 km^{2} (1.0 sq mi)
- Elevation: 230 m (750 ft)
- Highest elevation: 390 m (1,280 ft)
- Lowest elevation: 229 m (751 ft)
- Population (2023): 131
  - Density: 49/km^{2} (130/sq mi)
- Time zone: UTC+01:00 (CET)
  - Summer (DST): UTC+02:00 (CEST)
- INSEE/Postal code: 71496 /71150
- ^{1} French Land Register data, which excludes lakes, ponds, glaciers > 1 km^{2} (0.386 sq mi or 247 acres) and river estuaries.

Sampigny-lès-Maranges (French pronunciation: [sɑ̃piɲi lɛ maʁɑ̃ʒ], lit. 'Sampigny near Maranges') is a commune in the Saône-et-Loire department in the region of Bourgogne-Franche-Comté in eastern France.

== Wine ==
The vineyards of Sampigny-lès-Maranges are included in the Maranges wine appellation.

== See also ==
- Communes of the Saône-et-Loire department
