= Christian mysticism in ancient Africa =

Christian mysticism in ancient Africa took form in the desert, as part of a long-reaching Judeo-Christian-Islamic mystical tradition. In the Judeo-Christian-Islamic mystical tradition, the desert is known to induce religious experiences and altered states of consciousness.

The first signs of Christian mysticism in Africa followed the teachings of Montanus in the late 2nd century. Followers of Montanus, called Montanists, induced ecstatic experiences out of which they would prophesy. Usually the prophecies were spoken in an unknown language.

In the mid- to late 3rd century, the deserts of northern Africa became home to a deeply devout group known as the Desert Fathers or Desert People. These individuals were highly influenced by the intellectual components of Coptic Christianity. They led quiet lives and communicated the Gospel with those whom they traded with. Their movement became the template of Western eremitism and monasticism. The architect of the template was Saint Anthony, the foundational Desert Father.

== Montanists ==
The Montanists, whose presence dates back to 179, headed a social, mystical, and prophetic movement that highly influenced Christian mysticism. Beginning in Asia Minor, Montanus' teachings spread through much of Europe and Africa. Foundational to Montanus' teachings was the concept that a human being could be no more than a lyre which the Divine strummed. When in a state of ecstasy, humans were believed to be able to channel messages from God. Montanism was firmest in North Africa and Asia Minor, though it was considered heretical by the majority of Christians. Presently, many Montanistic elements are foundational for many self-identified Christian denominations, but are generally considered heterodox at best or heretical by more orthodox groups.

== Desert Fathers ==
The monasticism of the Desert Fathers of northern Africa stressed shaking off the priorities society offered, in pursuit instead of experiential knowledge of God. They lived very practically, emphasizing work and self-sufficiency, selling their weaved mats and baskets and their time as harvesters. They preferred to avoid depending on charity. It is said that with their earnings, they fed not only the local poor, but sent shiploads of grain to the prisons and poor of Alexandria, Egypt. Most came from a low-income background. Many of these monastics were considered ascetics and were popularly admired. Concurrently, they were condemned by some who considered them overly enthusiastic heretics.

The Desert Fathers' mystical experiences are said to be the result of three major components: 1. the reading, hearing, speaking and singing of the Scriptures; 2. their devotion to the sacraments, especially the Eucharist; and, 3. fellowship within the spiritual community of the Church. Another major component may be their desire to encounter and confront Satan. The Desert People believed it was safer to know Satan and his workings than to allow Satan to do his work in hiding. They are reported to have had a saying that went: "No temptation; no salvation".

Total isolation, among the Desert Fathers, was an option each monk had open for her or himself. They often lived in small monastic villages, but built them far away from other settlements so that complete privacy could be ensured. There were also monasteries, built as permanent housing for the monks of a given area. Villages and monasteries served to connect the monastics to formalized church bodies. The monasteries, in particular, were made to be visitor-friendly and welcomed outsiders to visit. Many outsiders were reported to have been unable or hardly able to endure the strict sleep and dietary regiments the monks were habituated to.
