= Re-Imagining =

Re-Imagining was a Minneapolis interfaith conference of clergy, laypeople, and feminist theologians in 1993 that stirred controversy in U.S. Mainline Protestant denominations, ultimately resulting in the firing of Mary Ann Lundy, the highest ranking woman in the Presbyterian Church (U.S.A.). Re-Imagining: A Global Theological Conference By Women: For Men and Women, grew out of a U.S.A. Mainline Protestant response to the World Council of Churches' Ecumenical Decade: Churches in Solidarity with Women 1988–1998. Participants met at the Minneapolis Convention Center during November 4 through 7, 1993.

It brought together 2,200 people, one third of them clergy, and most of them women. 83 men registered. Attendees represented 16 denominations, 27 countries, and 49 states. (Nevada was not represented.) All presenters were women. The conference aimed to encourage churches to address injustices to women worldwide and promote equal partnership with men at all levels of religious life. In recognition of supporters' view that traditional Christianity's male-centered language and images have often stifled and hurt women, organizers chose "re-imagining" as the theme. International theologians were invited to address the theme as it applied to God, Jesus, church, creation, community, and world. Other presentations carried the theme through "Church as Worshipping Community," "Language/Word," "Sexuality/Family," and "Ethics/Work/Ministry." After four days of community and freedom of discussion with like-minded women, hearing internationally recognized feminist theologians advance new ways of thinking about Christianity, and hearing their deity referred to with female pronouns, attendees reported having a transformational experience. A number of similar conferences had been held, but the size, scope and creative atmosphere of Re-Imagining eclipsed anything that had come before.

== Sponsorship and controversy ==
Three Minnesota councils of churches and the Twin Cities Metropolitan Church Commission sponsored the event. The latter organization's director, the Reverend Sally Abrahams Hill, was instrumental in organizing the conference along with Mary Ann Lundy, then director of the Presbyterian Church (U.S.A.)'s Women's Ministry Unit and Jeanne Audrey Powers of the United Methodist Church. 140 volunteers helped organize the event during a 3-year planning process.

The Presbyterian Church (U.S.A.) donated staff time and $66,000 from an initial grant from its Bicentennial Fund. The Women's Division of the United Methodist Board of Global Ministries paid the way of 46 top staff members to attend the event. Presbyterians sent 20 staff members, and officers in both denominations helped plan Re-Imagining. According to the invitational conference brochure mailed in November 1992, cost per person ranged from $100 for early registration to $150 for late registration.

Several months afterward, conservative newsletters, Good News and The Presbyterian Layman, within the mainline United Methodist Church and Presbyterian Church (U.S.A.) denominations respectively, ran articles expressing outrage over what they called goddess worship and heresy at the conference. The controversy they stirred resulted in enough members dropping donations to cause a serious backlash. Mary Ann Lundy was fired seven months later. No United Methodists were fired at a national level.

== Concerns raised ==
- Goddess worship due in part to the "Bless Sophia" chant used throughout Re-Imagining. The conference program printed the chant set to music on page 2: "Bless Sophia/dream the vision/share the wisdom/dwelling deep within." Proverbs 8 and 9 in the Christian Bible refer to Sophia as the personification of Wisdom and supporters say organizers intended to invoke Wisdom's blessing while valuing each woman's life and experiences.
- Understanding and acceptance for homosexual, bisexual, and transgender persons expressed by speakers from the podium.
- 'A Sunday Morning ritual, which reimagined God as feminine, celebrated Sophia and took the place of Eucharist...participants shared milk and honey rather than wine and bread. Interlaced with the celebration of Sophia, was a celebration of God with feminine traits which served also as an affirmation of women's gifts such as bearing children and nursing
- A bare-breasted woman depicted in one section of a painting created by Nancy Chinn during the conference near the podium.
- A number of what critics called provocative statements and heresy from speakers. One example: Dr. Delores Williams stating, "I don't think we need a theory of atonement (Atonement in Christianity)," and, "I don't think we need folks hanging on crosses, and blood dripping, and weird stuff." These comments came during the question and answer session after her presentation.

A context for Williams's statements is her complete answer to the audience question, "What is our theory of atonement to be? For what did Jesus come?"

Williams: "I don't think we need a theory of atonement at all. I think Jesus came for life and (to show us) how to live together, what life was all about." She references visiting a Catholic church in which the only divine images were the Virgin and Child, the Cross, and the empty tomb. "No images of ministry, of the mustard seed, fishes and loaves. I don't think we need folks hanging on crosses, and blood dripping, and weird stuff. We need the sustenance, the faith, the candles to light. Jesus' mandate is that we pass on tough love, love that's whipping the thieves out of the temple. I don't see that the cross does that. I think the cross ought to be interpreted for what it was, a symbol of evil, the murder of an innocent man and victim. When we confront the status quo as Jesus did, when we raise questions about the poor and empowering people who've never had power before, we're more than likely going to die for it."

== Program and speakers ==
According to conference materials, organizers called their schedule a "Time Flow" and encouraged participants to express themselves via art materials at every table, dance movements, and Talking Circles. Each attendee received a program book filled with songs, chants, and liturgies used throughout the presentations.

=== Thursday ===
==== Religious Imagination ====
- Mary Bednarowski, a Roman Catholic layperson and Ph.D. professor of religious studies at United Theological Seminary of the Twin Cities. Her publications include the books, American Religion: A Cultural Perspective, (Prentice-Hall, 1984) and New Religions and the Theological Imagination in American Culture (Indiana University Press, 1989.)
- Bernice Johnson Reagon, Ph.D. a curator in the Division of Community Life at the Smithsonian Institution, National Museum of American History. A member of the original Student Nonviolent Coordinating Committee Freedom Singers, she founded Sweet Honey in the Rock, an African American women's a cappella quintet.
- Chung Hyun Kyung, Ph.D. Assistant Professor in theology, Ewha Womans University, Seoul, Korea. Author of Struggle to Be the Sun Again: Introducing Asian Women's Theology, (Orbis Books, 1990.)

Bednarowski set the stage for the conference with her remarks. She said, "We have come to claim the deepest depths of Christianity. . . . We have come together to do this work out of our experiences as women of faith who share the conviction that our tradition has the resilience, the inexhaustible resources and creativity, to sustain a re-imagining of its most central symbols."

Reagon began her presentation by singing encouragement for those who suffer. "We'll stand the storm It won't be long We'll anchor by and by." She said, "The storm is the only way I know what an anchor is." She sang: "My God is a rock in a weary land I know He's a rock in a weary land."."

Hyun Kyung invoked her Asian heritage and experiences to discuss her way of understanding God and theology. She asked for a theology and theologians who go beyond naming evils such as racism and sexism and become "alive" and "whole," centered in the reality of the world. She ended by saying, "We need to remember within us there must be men and women, East and West, past and future. Deep within us . . . how do we live with a cosmic connectedness? This is our task."

=== Friday ===
==== Re-Imagining God ====
- Chung Hyun Kyung discussed her difficulty being both fully Christian and fully Asian. She noted that Korea had 5,000 years of Shamanism, 2,000 years of Taoism, about 2,000 years of Buddhism, and 700 of Confucianism. Then her country had 100 years of Protestantism. "All of them are within me." She invoked three Asian goddesses which transformed her understanding of God, bringing into focus the need for justice, wisdom, compassion, persistence and resilience.
- Rita Nakashima Brock was an associate professor at that time who held the Endowed Chair in the Humantities at Hamline University in St. Paul, Minnesota. Author of Journeys By Heart: A Christology of Erotic Power (Crossroad 1988.)

Brock recalled the story of the assertive Canaanite woman in Matthew 15:21–28 who challenges Jesus to help her daughter, who is "severely possessed by a demon." (RSV) Brock asks, "What does it mean to be possessed by a demon? . . . possession is the sign of soul murder happening in a child. The Canaanite woman is fighting for the soul of her daughter, for the return of her daughter's incarnation to her. We are fighting for the soul of the church too long possessed by patriarchy."

==== Re-imagining Jesus ====
- Delores S. Williams, Associate Professor of Theology and Culture at Union Theological Seminary in New York. Contributing editor for Christianity and Crisis. Author of Sisters in the Wilderness: Challenge of Womanist God Talk (Orbis Books, 1992.)
- Kwok Pui-lan, Associate Professor of Theology at the Episcopal Divinity School at Cambridge, Massachusetts. Author of Chinese Women and Christianity, 1860–1927. (Scholar's Press 1992.) See Postcolonial feminism
- Barbara K. Lundblad, pastor of Our Saviour's Atonement Lutheran Church in NY City. She has preached on the Protestant Hourand at Chauttaqua Institute.

Williams grew up in the South attending a black Baptist church. With her remarks, she recognized that she would be violating one of the survival skills of African Americans, "Never pass up an opportunity to keep your mouth shut." She spoke of the way Jesus has historically been presented to American blacks: as one who condoned slavery, as a white, blue-eyed, serene middle class or better man looking up to heaven. "Black Americans have always had to re-image Jesus." Otherwise, his image would have borne "no agony, no Jew-ness, no poverty or struggle." Williams' Womanist theological framework derives from the idea that the "Holy Spirit came through a woman's body . . . the Word was made flesh in a woman's body. This is how the Spirit came into the world . . .," and "understanding God as male or female is limiting." She advocated for understanding deity as Holy Spirit. She ended with a quotation from theologian Karl Barth which reminded her of her grandmother's faith: "The righteousness of God is higher than pain and deeper than joy. God is faithful. We're not, but God is faithful, and we've found Jesus to be." Earlier in her remarks, Williams said it's problematic for black women to accept the substitution theory of atonement (that Jesus's purpose was to die on the cross for our sins,) because black women's experiences of "substituting" such as rearing white babies and being sexual partners for white men during slavery were in no way just or salvific. She advocated an emphasis on Jesus's life, his justice work, his healing, not his death. "Jesus conquered sin in the wilderness, in life."

Kwok Pui-lan (see Postcolonial feminism): "How many of you could imagine Jesus as something like me? . . . Asking me to speak? it is indeed iconoclastic. . . The colonizers need a white Jesus. We need to save ourselves from the white folks." She encouraged listeners to "ask the questions we always wanted to ask," and focused on differences in language, history, and imagery among cultures which have made accepting traditional Christianity difficult for the Chinese. "We want to be 100% Asians and 100% Christians." She invoked three images: students massacred in Tiananmen Square, 400,000 prostitutes in Thailand, 60% of them HIV positive, and the "victory," her way of seeing Jesus.."

Lundblad invoked the pregnancy story of John the Baptist's mother, Elizabeth, in Luke to illustrate an emphasis on birthing something new and different and asking listeners to trust the "stirring in your wombs." In closing her remarks, said, "I do not need Jesus to be a woman. I need to believe that I am called to take the scroll of Isaiah in my hands and read the words with my name attached: 'The Spirit of the Lord is upon me, anointing me to preach good news to the poor, release to the captive, recovery of sight to all those who refuse to see.' (Luke 4:18, author's paraphrase.)." She confessed that in her deepest moments of doubt, she cannot leave Jesus. She hears Him say to her, "Do not hold me in the old categories which no longer touch you . . . do not hold on to those telling you this is a story of death not life. Do not hang on to the right answers which came from somebody else because you fear they will say you are blaspheming and you are a heretic. No, say instead, you are pregnant."

==== Re-imagining Creation ====
- Anne Primavesi, Ph.D., member of Associate Faculty at Schumacher College
- Sister Jose Hobday, O.S.F., Holy Names College, Oakland, CA
- Elizabeth Bettenhausen, Ph.D., Women's Theological Center, Boston and the Divinity School at Harvard University

Bettenhausen (excerpt) "We need to re-imagine the doctrine of creation because, if you create out of nothing (creatio ex nihilo,) the something is always a problem. We get theological investigations of the relationship between the Creator and the creation. Are they connected after all? Is God wholly transcendent? Or is God partially immanent? . . . It all boils down to the burning question that is the real question if you start from creation literally out of nothing: what do God and the world have to do with each other anyhow? They have been construed as so different that you really must struggle to get them reconnected again."

==== Re-imagining Church as Spiritual Institution ====
- Ada Maria Isasi-Diaz, Ph.D., Asst. Professor of Theology and Ethics at Drew University
- Joan Martin, doctoral candidate at Temple University and ordained Presbyterian pastor

Martin (excerpt) "Spirituality is about what kind of heart you have. It's about whether your heart makes your words and your feet walk together. Spirituality is not about right talk; it's not about right prayer; it's not about right theological doctrine; it's about right living, whether your talk meets your walk, and not just individually, but in your communities. If we do not talk specifically about things like racism and classism, and homophobia, and imperialism, our walk is valueless, because it's merely talk."

==== Re-imagining Women/Arts/ Church ====
- Nancy Chinn, artist.
- Nalini Jayusuria, painter, writer, musician from Sri Lanka.
- Ingeline Nelson, Ph.D., musician from Germany and Zimbabwe.

=== Saturday ===
==== Re-imagining Community ====
- Lois Miriam Wilson, Chancellor of Lakehead University, Canada, ordained minister, and the first woman Moderator of The United Church of Canada.
- Mercy Amba Oduyoye, Ghana, lay pastor in Methodist tradition, Deputy General Secretary of the World Council of Churches in Geneva.

Mercy Oduyoye (excerpt) "We have become conscious not only that we have one world but that, varied as we appear to be, we are one human race. We are slowly beginning to come to terms with the fact that the one God with many names, and the several religions expressing the revelation of the one God they have received, is the God of all creation. . . . Persons trained in linear thinking immediately feel threatened by the emphasis, because they see community well-being as opposed to that of the individual. They are afraid of being lost in the crowd, of being only a number, a cog, a nameless part with no identity, no will, and no liberty. This is far from the case . . . Mutual caring is central to this communal ideology, and individuals are recognized for their contribution in this respect and encouraged to excel at being caring. Africans know that an individual hunts down an elephant to give meat to the whole village."

==== Re-imagining Language/Word ====
- Johanna W. H. Bos, Ph.D. professor of Old Testament at Louisville Presbyterian Theological Seminary
- Rosario Batle, D. Min. United Evangelical Theological Seminary, Madrid, Spain
- Jacquelyn Grant, Ph.D., founder and director of Black Women in Church and Society, Asst. Minister at Flipper Temple A.M.E. church in Atlanta, GA.

Batle spoke of attending an East African inter-denominational seminary "bound by tradition and a non-inclusive British system." She and three other women endured "33 months of male chauvinist terrorism." She continued, "Now I began to understand feminist theology was a Godsend to Liberation Theology because it reminded the men that the struggle from oppression and for abundant life was meant for women, too. . . . The Gospel gives women a voice in the history of salvation and set my African sisters singing and dancing . . We must be freed by the Gospel of Jesus Christ. Only if we claim our own true liberation can men also be liberated in the world . . ., and that true partnership be established which God intended from the beginning."."

Bos began her talk with a song: "We shall not give up the fight/ We have only started." Her text was 2 Kings, Chapter 22, a story reflecting the positive and strengthening nature of change. In this text the prophet Huldah is the interpreter and canonizer of Holy Scripture, who announces the end of things as they are. The text authorized by Huldah reveals God, the source of all good, in implacable opposition to structures of oppression. We know that patriarchy distorts all relations in the created world and its institutions, a state that surely grieves God's heart today. Huldah warns that it may not be enough to clean it all up, that the old has to come down before a new community can begin. By God's grace we recognize that the word of judgment has come especially to patriarchal hierarchies that possess the temple. We know that the axe has been laid to the root of that tree. We are ready to engage battle with the structures, knowing that change may be a long time in coming, but come it will surely. ."

Grant said, "We are called to free God from all our oppressive linguistic gymnastics." She compared God to the black woman, "the suffering servant who is despised and rejected by humanity. . . the black woman has borne our griefs, carried our sorrow, and been bruised by white iniquity." She emphasized freeing God from limitations.

==== Re-imagining Sexuality/Family ====
- Frances E. Wood, writer and educator. Author of training and policy manuals on issues of sexual abuse, AIDS, and domestic violence for a number of denominations.
- Susan Brooks Thistlethwaite, Professor of Theology at the Chicago Theological Seminary and an ordained minister of the United Church of Christ. Author of Lift Every Voice: Constructing Christian Theologies From the Underside.
- Mary E. Hunt, co-founder and co-director of WATER, Women's Alliance for Theology, Ethics, and Ritual. Author of Fierce Tenderness.

Thistlethwaite invoked a critique of French philosopher Michel Foucalt to discuss sexuality and the sex industry. Listeners gasped when she said, "The International Monetary Fund funded the sex industry in Thailand for its development."

Mary Elizabeth Hunt criticized the church for being distracted by sexuality when the real issues of concern are violence, poverty, and exploitation of the powerless.

==== Re-imagining Ethics/Work/Ministry ====
- Aruna Gnanadson, World Council of Churches, India.
- Beverly Wildung Harrison, Professor of Ethics at Union Theological Seminary in New York City. Author of Our Right to Choose: Toward a New Ethic of Abortion.
- Toinette M. Eugene, Associate Professor of Christian Social Ethics at Garrett Evangelical Seminary in Evanston, Illinois.

Gnanadson spoke in a framework common to her native India of a short story with characters: Patriarchy, a destructive spirit, Man, Woman, the Church, and the Feminine Spirit. "Man fell deep into Patriarchy's clutches and focused on the market, profits and competition instead of social welfare, care for the marginalized, and the restructuring of economies to make them more humane." She envisioned a new church because "If the church were faithful to Christ, it would have been in the vanguard of struggles for freedom and human dignity, but had in fact strangled itself in institutional apathy.""

==== Re-imagining Church as Worshipping Community ====
- Christine Marie Smith, Associate Professor of Preaching and Worship at the United Theological Seminary of the Twin Cities.
- Virginia Ramey Mollenkott, Professor of English at William Patterson College of New Jersey. Author of 12 books including: Women, Men, and the Bible, The Divine Feminine: The Biblical Imagery of God as Female, and Is the Homosexual My Neighbor?
- Ofelia Ortega, Presbyterian pastor, Cuba. First woman to be ordained in the Reformed Church of Latin America.

Smith (excerpt) "Worshipping communities hunger for confession: worship moments in our common life where we can speak honestly and truthfully about our own lives and the realities of the world. Hope is not engendered by illusions or lies. Hope is engendered by the truth."

Mollenkott spoke of growing up in the Plymouth Brethren tradition attending four hours of worship on Sundays and more on Tuesday nights. She came from a background that was so fundamentalist that by the time she got to Bob Jones University, that seemed like the most liberal Christian place ever. Mollenkott said, "I was taught that whenever a woman speaks or leads in church, the result is always heresy." She was shamed publicly by her parents when her homosexuality was discovered. "The worshipping community I would envision would have to be sincerely determined to uproot in itself any vestiges of assuming that some people are entitled to more than others because of gender differences, sexual orientation, racism, nationalism, socio-economic class, or any other reason human egos can think up.".

== After the controversy ==
Originally set to be a one-time conference, Re-Imagining responded to the conservative backlash by creating a Re-Imagining Community. Those involved strived to support the struggles of clergy and lay women and give voice to emerging feminist theologies. They produced newsletters and met annually for ten years with no funding from major denominations. The continuation was on a much smaller scale supported by memberships and individuals, with less than 300 registered for the last meeting in 2003. Ten years afterward, one woman minister who attended the first conference was reported as saying in a January 12, 2004, Charlotte Observer article, "we can still get in trouble for talking about Re-Imagining."
