= Virginia Fabella =

- Born: May 1, 1928 (age 98)
- Occupations: Theologian, writer, editor, religious sister
- Known for: Asian feminist theology, post colonial theology

Virginia Fabella, MM (born May 1, 1928) is a Filipina theologian, writer, editor and Maryknoll sister who is well known for her works in Asian feminist theology and postcolonial theology.

== Biography ==
She was born in Manila, Philippines om May 1, 1928 to Carmen J. DeJesus Fabella and Vincente Fabella. After graduating from the Assumption Convent in Manila and receiving a BS from Mt. St. Vincent College in New York, Fabella joined the Maryknoll Sisters in he year 1952. She later earned a Master of Arts in Religious Studies from the Maryknoll Seminary in 1980, a Certificate in Pastoral Studies from Union Theological in Chicago in 1988, and a DMin in Women’s Studies from San Francisco Theological Seminary in 1993. Her doctoral dissertation was titled "The Development of Women's Theological Consciousness within the Ecumenical Association of Third World Theologians."

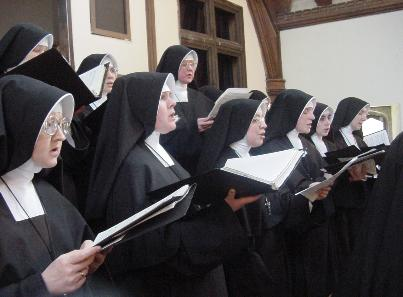
Sisters of Maryknoll

In the 1970s, Fabella served as the program coordinator for the Ecumenical Association of Third World Theologians, and later becoming its Asia Coordinator.

== Theology ==
Perhaps most well known for her writings and editing on Asian feminist theology and postcolonial theology. In terms of Christology Fabella argues that the maleness of Jesus does not present an issue for Asian women. She suggests that 'the maleness of Jesus made him a more effective renouncer of the male concept of humanity... [and] showed the way to a healthy and correct male-female relationship'

== Works ==
- Fabella, Virginia; Sugirtharajah, R. S., eds. (2003). Dictionary of Third World Theologies. Maryknoll, NY: Orbis Books. ISBN 978-1-57075-405-0.
- Fabella, Virginia; Oduyoye, Mercy Amba, eds. (2006). With Passion and Compassion: Third World Women Doing Theology: Reflections from the Women's Commission of the Ecumenical Association of Third World Theologians. Eugene, OR: Wipf and Stock Publishers. ISBN 978-1-59752-500-8.
- Fabella, Virginia; Park, Sun Ai Lee, eds. (2015). We Dare to Dream: Doing Theology as Asian Women. Eugene, OR: Wipf and Stock Publishers. ISBN 978-1-4982-1914-3.

== See also ==
- Asian feminist theology
