= Asian feminist theology =

Type of Christian feminist theology

Asian feminist theology is a Christian feminist theology developed to be especially relevant to women in Asia and women of Asian descent. Inspired by both liberation theology and Christian feminism, it aims to contextualize them to the conditions and experiences of women and religion in Asia.

== History ==
The first recognizable collective attempt to do Asian feminist theology can be traced to the late 1970s, when Asian feminist theologians saw the need to stress the commonality of Asian women. There was a call to embrace their shared identity as Asian women first and foremost. Emphasis was placed on the shared and lived experiences of oppression, colonialism, and neo-colonialism, and the theology of this stage was more reflective and descriptive than analytical.

This stage saw the formation of theological networks and centres that aimed to study the gendered dimension of both theology and society. The Conference of Theologically Trained Women of Asia was founded in January 1981 followed by The Women's Commission of the Ecumenical Association of Third World Theologians (EATWOT) in 1983. The first Asian women's theological journal In God's Image was founded in 1982 and helped form the Asian Women's Resource Centre for Culture and Theology in 1988. These organizations, networks and centres allowed Asian female theologians to discuss strategies for dealing with patriarchy in society, the church and theology, as a way to differentiate themselves from male liberation theology and western feminist theology.

Hyun Hui Kim notes that, in the 1990s, a second stage included an awareness of the dangers of generalizing experiences. Asian feminist theologians began to call to attention the diversity and wide range of lives and situations experienced by women across Asia. Turning to their own traditions and cultures, Asian feminist theologians began to look at these with a critical feminist consciousness, while at the same time identifying in them liberating and life-affirming aspects to emulate and draw upon.

Since the 2000s, the third and present stage sees a range of diverse theories and subjects being engaged with. Christology was from the beginning a key issue of interest for Asian feminist theologians and this has remained so, however there are now works being done on subjects such as Mariology, sophia, soteriology, and ecclesiology. Theologians are engaging with a wider range of theories such as postcolonial theology, psychoanalysis, political feminist hermeneutics, and others. Additionally, other hallmarks of this stage include more work being done on the notion of hybrid identities by second- and third-generation immigrant Asian women such as Wonhee Anne Joh and Grace Ji-Sun Kim, as well as a shift in focus onto the oppression faced by Asian women in the Western world.

== Context ==
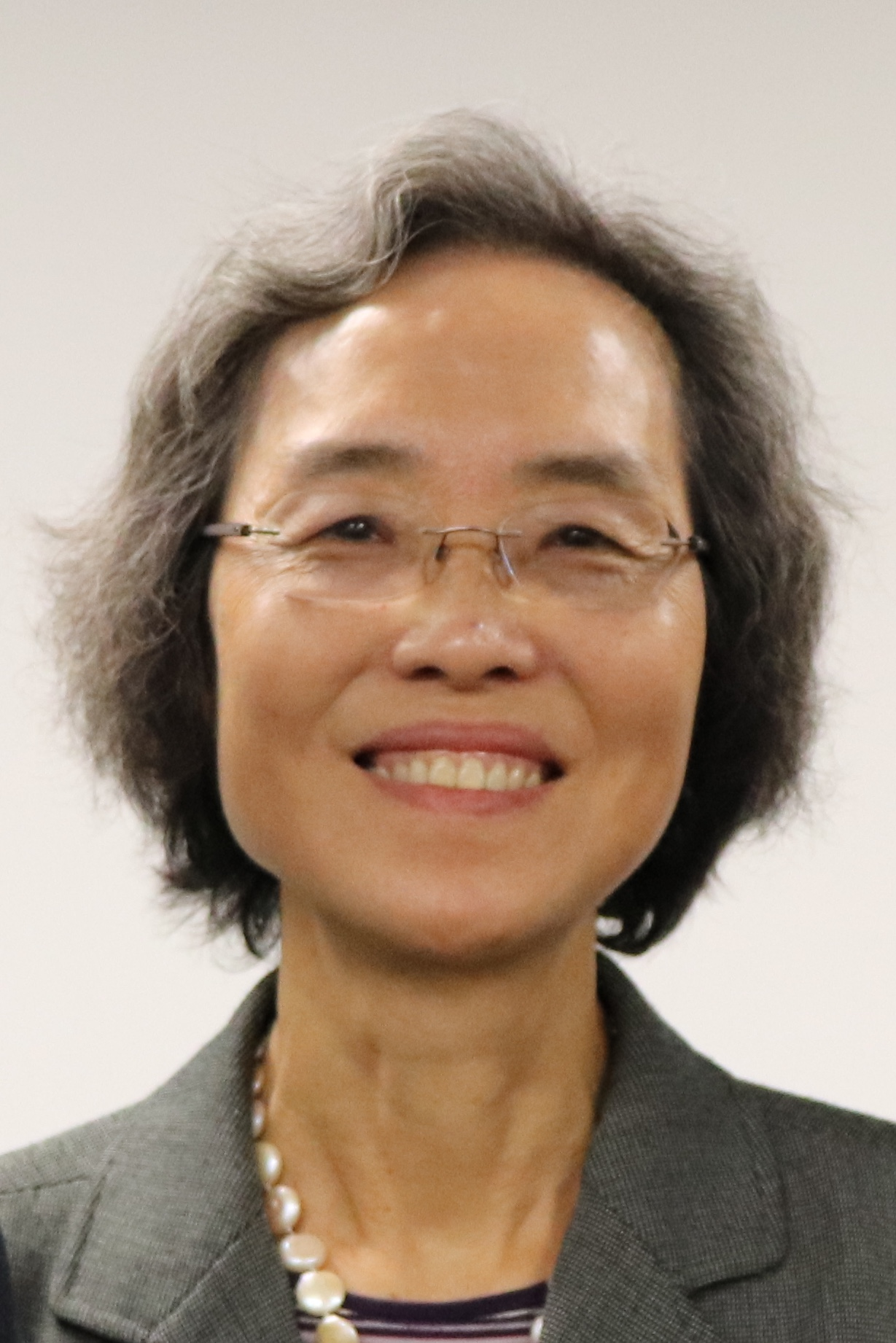
Kwok Pui-lan

The decolonization of Asia saw the rise in the 1960s of new Asian theology being written by figures such as M. M. Thomas, Kosuke Koyama, and D. T. Niles. However, these men tended to look to traditional Asian cultures and practices as sources for their theology, neglecting the experiences of women and romanticizing Asian traditions without properly critiquing their patriarchal elements. Chinese theologian Kwok Pui-lan writes "challenging the colonial legacy, these theologians sometimes were too eager to embrace the cultural traditions of Asia, without taking sufficient notice of their elitist and sexist components." Wai-Ching Angela Wong furthers this point, noting that "Asianness and nationalism alike will easily fall into the old trap of orientalism, which fixes 'the Orient' in time and place"; this is especially oppressive to Asian women.

Problems were also found within Western feminist theology which was accused of:

1. speaking from a tradition where Christianity was dominant, which was largely irrelevant for most Asian women
2. a tendency to universalize Western experiences as representative
3. being insufficiently radical – failing to consider the axes of colonialism, cultural imperialism, religious pluralism, and internalized oppression and colonialism
4. some displayed racist or ethnocentric orientations that essentialized Asian women

== Sources ==
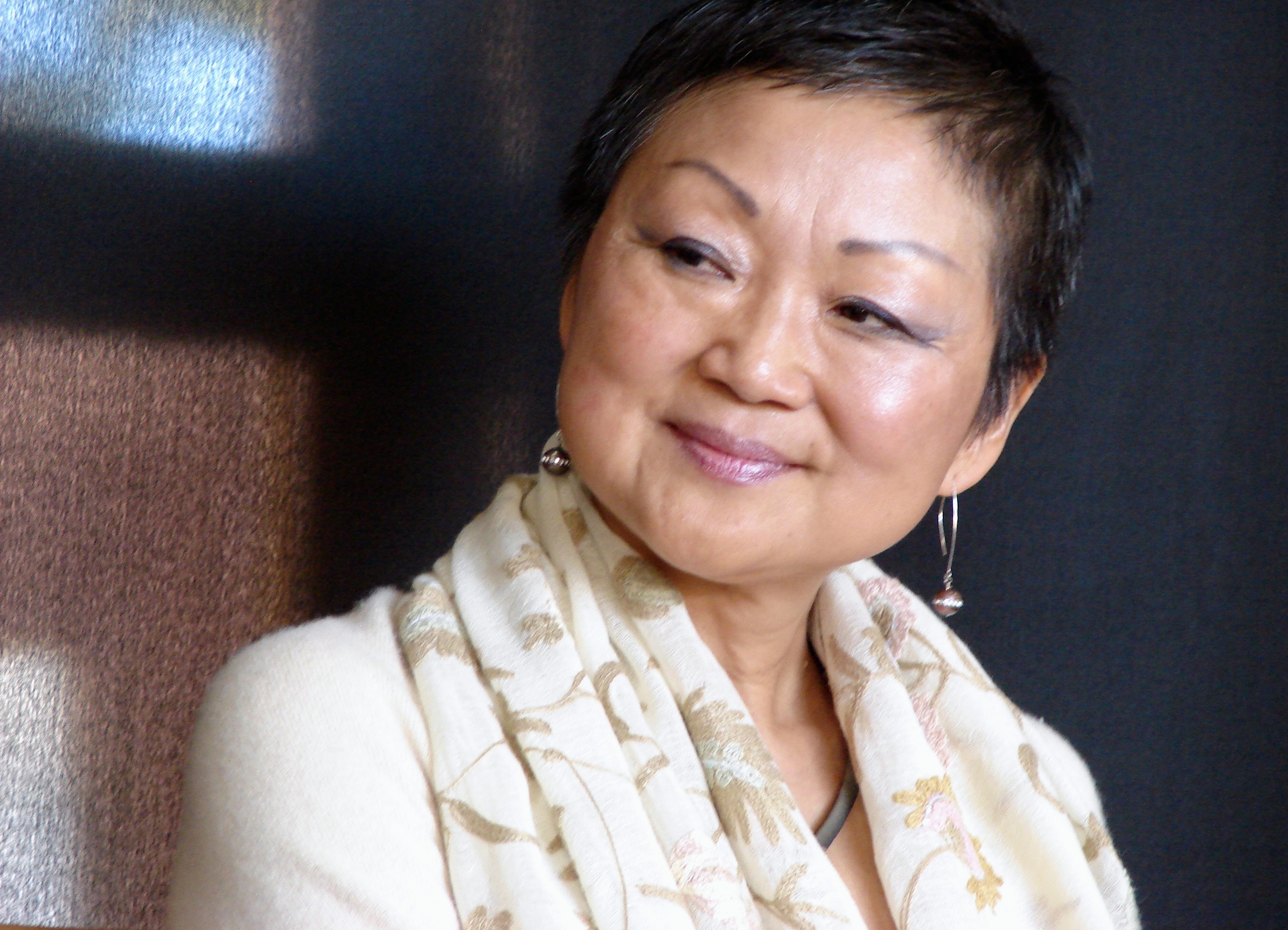
Chung Hyun Kyung

In seeking a new theology, Asian feminist theologians have turned to traditional practices, myths, and motifs, while at the same time being aware of criticisms related to cultural hybridization, or what may be termed "syncretism."

An example of this is detailed by Korean theologian Chung Hyun Kyung who talks about han-pu-ri as a way for Asian women to find healing. Chung describes han as coming from "the sinful interconnections of classism, racism, sexism, colonialism, neo-colonialism, and cultural imperialism which Korean people experience everyday". For her, this built-up han is imprisoning Korean women. The ritual of han-pu-ri, overseen mostly by female shamans, is a method of liberation that is especially helpful as it is "one of the few spaces where poor Korean women played their spiritual role without being dominated by male-centred religious authorities".

Oral tradition also plays an important role due to its central place in many Asian societies, especially among Asian women. Hence, poems, songs, stories, and dance are seen as different expressions of theological articulation.

== Theology ==
=== Bible ===
Asian feminist theologians draw upon Biblical stories such as that of the Samaritan woman, the Syrophoenician woman as well as the figure of Mary, mother of Jesus who is seen as the first fully liberated human by Indonesian writer Marianne Katoppo.

=== God ===
Unlike some Western feminists, Asian feminist theologians have little problem with the language used to speak about God, or the gender of Jesus. Indeed, for some such as Virginia Fabella, the very fact that Jesus is male is advantageous. She writes, "among Asian women, the maleness of Jesus has not been a problem for we see it as 'accidental' to the salvific process. His maleness was not essential but functional. By being male, Jesus could more repudiate more effectively the male definition of humanity and show the way to a right and just male–female relationship".

The Asian feminist understanding of God is holistic and ecological. This approach sees God in all life (Panentheism) and views God as the creative power that sustains life. There is an emphasis on relationality of humans, other life-forms and God. Chung Hyun Kyung states, "Asian women emphasize the importance of community in their theologies because only in community can humanity reflect God and fulfil the image of God".

It also moves away from the dualism of Western approaches that insist on a divide between mind and body, nature and culture, male and female. Instead, God is seen to easily possess both masculine and feminine qualities. Padma Gallup of India claims that Western Christianity has lost this inclusive understanding as it is too "wrapped in layers of ponderous patriarchy, Dualistic cosmology of Zoroastrianism, Greek philosophy, and the ethics of the marketplace and morality of the dominant male of the Puritan tradition."

=== Christology ===
For some Asian women, the images of Christ that were propagated during the colonial era are unhelpful. The notion of Jesus as Lord reinforced servility to colonial authorities, and the image of Jesus as the Suffering Servant encouraged passiveness and docility. Virginia Fabella writes, "Asian women have been 'lorded over' for centuries and all the major religions including Christianity have contributed to this sinful situation." Likewise, Muriel Orevillo-Montenegro explains that "the Jesus of Asian women is the Asian Christ who accompanies them in their daily struggles for liberation from all forms of oppression and suffering. This Christ seeks to engage with religions, cultures, and indigenous spiritualities to make life flourish for every living being."

Instead, they have understood Jesus as a liberator, who has come to set people free both spiritually and from their earthly bondage of socio-economic oppression. Asian feminists have emphasized how Jesus sought out the poor and marginalized within society, and noted his ministry with women (Mark 5:25–43; Luke 7:11–17; Luke 13:10–17; John 4:1–42; Matthew 15:21–28) as well as his female disciples (Matthew 27:55–56; Mark 15:40–41; Luke 8:1–3; John 20:14–18).

Other notions of Christ include a reworking of his suffering to mean that he is compassionate and deeply empathetic and understanding of the suffering faced by many Asian women; and an organic model of Christology as advocated by Kwok who looks at Jesus' use of metaphors from nature (John 4:14; John 6:35; John 15:1–8).

=== Spirituality ===
For many Asian feminist theologians such as Chung Hyun Kyung, Rita Nakashima Brock, and Susan Brooks Thistlethwaite, spirituality involves both body and soul in harmony and focuses on the joyful celebration of life. Specifically, the female body is embraced and loved, reacting against traditions such as female infanticide and sex tourism that devalue female bodies. This spirituality is holistic and life-affirming, exhorting women's procreative power and emphasizing interconnection with all living things.

=== Sexuality ===
Asian feminist theologians see sexuality as an important part of spirituality. For some such as Elizabeth Dominguez, sensuality and erotic love is to be embraced as God has intended it to be the purest form of human communion. Reacting against traditional church teachings that inhibit the eroticism of women, for Asian feminist theologians, a woman's sensuality is something that is liberating and freeing, allowing them to feel deeply towards God and others.
