= Musa Dube =

Motswana feminist theologian and biblical scholar

Musa Wenkosi Dube
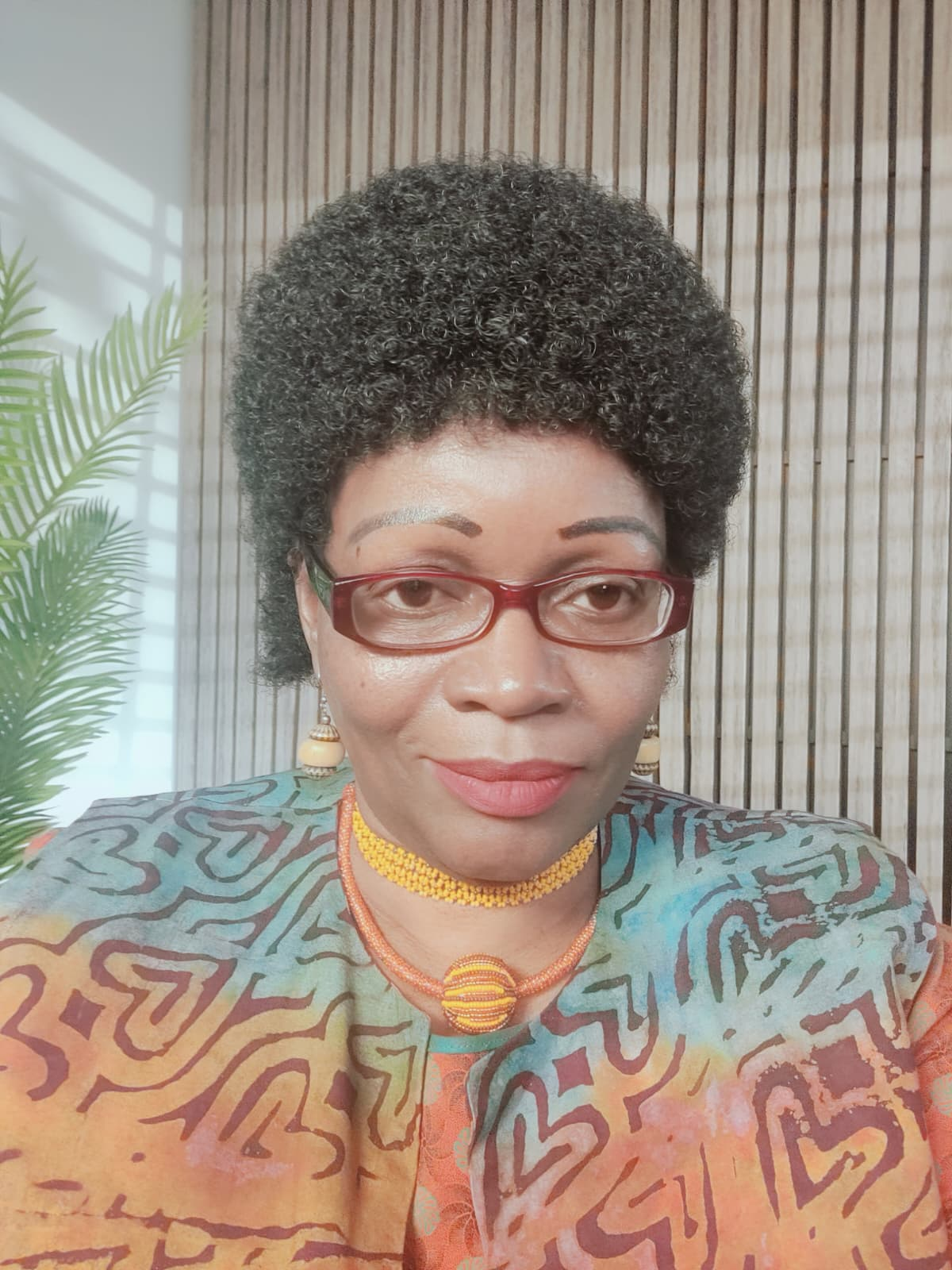
- Born: 28 July 1964 (age 62); Botswana
- Awards: Humboldt Prize

Academic background
- Education: University of Botswana; University of Durham; Vanderbilt University
- Doctoral advisor: Fernando Segovia

Academic work
- School or tradition: Biblical Criticism
- Main interests: Biblical criticism; Feminist theology; Postcolonial theology
- Notable works: Postcolonial Feminist Interpretation of the Bible
- Website: https://candler.emory.edu/faculty/profiles/dube-musa.html

Musa W. Dube (born 28 July 1964), also known as Musa Wenkosi Dube Shomanah, is a Motswana feminist theologian and Professor of New Testament at the Candler School of Theology, Emory University. She is known for her work in postcolonial biblical scholarship.

== Biography ==
Dube studied New Testament in the University of Durham in 1990, before completed her PhD in New Testament at Vanderbilt University in 1997, where she was supervised under postcolonial biblical scholar Fernando Segovia. She was Professor of New Testament at the University of Botswana. Dube joined the faculty of Candler School of Theology in Fall 2021 as a Professor of New Testament. She has written over two hundred and sixty scholarly works throughout her academic career that focus on liberation theology through a feminist postcolonial lens.

Dube is committed to approaching the biblical text from a feminist postcolonial lens. As a lay preacher in the Methodist church, Dube preaches a liberation theology which refuses to blame women for evil and offers new interpretations of scripture. Dube believes that Western perspectives on biblical writings are patriarchal which denies the truth of the gospel.

In 2011, Dube was a recipient of a Humboldt Prize, In 2017 she was the winner of the international Gutenberg Teaching Award. In 2018, she was awarded a Doctor of Theology honoris causa at Stellenbosch University, South Africa.

== Research ==
Dube's life experiences informed her academic interest in feminist post-colonial interpretations of scripture. In parts of Sub-Saharan Africa, Christianity is known as a distrusting religion introduced by colonizers and the cause of many injustices towards communities of color. Dube reintroduces the Bible in a postcolonial lens that addresses the issue of colonization without denying the Bible. She acknowledges the paradox for African men and women when it comes to dealing with religion, politics, and ethics.

== Works ==
- Dube, Musa W.; Wafula, R. S., eds. (2017). Postcoloniality, Translation, and the Bible in Africa. Wipf and Stock Publishers. ISBN 9781498295147.
- Dube, Musa W.; Mbuvi, Andrew M.; Mbuwayesango, Dora R., eds. (2013). Postcolonial Perspectives in African Biblical Interpretations. Society of Biblical Literature. ISBN 9781589837867.
- Dube, Musa W. (2012). Postcolonial Feminist Interpretation of the Bible. Chalice Press. ISBN 9780827230576.
- Dube, Musa W. (2008). The HIV & AIDS Bible: Selected Essays. University of Scranton Press. ISBN 9781589661141.
- Dube, Musa W. (2001). Other ways of reading: African women and the Bible. Society of Biblical Literature. ISBN 9782825413401.
- West, Gerald O.; Dube, Musa W., eds. (2000). The Bible in Africa: Transactions, Trajectories, and Trends. Brill. ISBN 9789004106277.
- Dube, Musa W. (2022). "‘What Is the Truth?’ (John 18:38) A Postcolonial Trickster Reading of Jesus’ Arrest and Trial." Tubinger Theologische Quartalschrift (2)54–73.
- Dube, M. W., Musili, T. K., & Owusu-Ansah, S. (Eds.). (2024). African women legends and the spirituality of resistance. London: Routledge. ISBN 978-1-032-60897-6
- Dube, M. W., Musili, T. K., & Owusu-Ansah, S. (Eds.). (2024). Gender, African philosophies, and concepts. London: Routledge. ISBN 978-1-032-62389-4
- Dube, M. W., Musili, T. K., & Owusu-Ansah, S. (Eds.). (2024). Gender and African indigenous religions. London: Routledge. ISBN 978-1-032-61074-0
