= Don H. Compier =

American dean

Don H. Compier served as Dean of the Bishop Kemper School for Ministry in Topeka, KS, from 2014 to 2024. BKSM is a joint project of the Episcopal Dioceses of Iowa, Missouri, Nebraska, Western Kansas, Kansas, and West Missouri. It uniquely seeks to educate candidates for ordained ministry, both priests and deacons, together with lay ministers. The school is strongly committed to making quality theological education affordable and accessible to all. Compier was ordained a priest in the Episcopal Church in January 2015.

Previously Compier was the founding Dean of the Community of Christ Seminary, Graceland University in 2002. He sought to make it a leader in online theological education and global outreach. Fluent in Spanish and Dutch, he has personally taught and consulted with other theological educators in Canada, Mexico, Honduras, Dominican Republic, Bolivia, Chile, Zambia, Spain, the Netherlands, Germany, Wales, England, Sri Lanka, Indonesia, India, and French Polynesia. He was very involved in efforts to establish a Kansas City consortium of seminaries and served as honorary chair of the Kansas City Association of Theological Schools. Committed to ecumenism, he is also a past president of the Society of Anglican and Lutheran Theologians.

Prior to becoming Dean of the Seminary, Compier was a Professor of Religion at Graceland University from 2001 to 2002. He was Associate Professor of Theology from 1997 to 2001 and an Assistant Professor of Systematic Theology from 1992–1997 at the Church Divinity School of the Pacific and Graduate Theological Union, Berkeley, California. He was also an Instructor at Emory University in the Department of Religion from 1990–1991. Compier received his Ph.D. in theological studies from the Graduate School of Religion at Emory University in 1992; an M.A. in Religion from Park College in 1985 and a B.A. from the University of the Pacific in 1978, where he majored in religion and European history. He also did graduate studies in Mexican history at Princeton University, the University of Texas, and El Colegio de Michoacan.

Compier has published more than fifteen peer-reviewed scholarly articles in the field of theology and religion. His has written three books: Listening to Popular Music (Fortress Press, 2013), which was named one of the ten best books in ethics in the annual book issue of Christian Century, John Calvin's Rhetorical Doctrine of Sin (Lewiston, New York: Edwin Mellen Press, 2001) and What is Rhetorical Theology? Textual Practice and Public Discourse (Trinity Press International, 1999). He is the co-editor of three books: “Theology 11: The Transformative Power of Theological Education” with Suzanne Trewitt McLaughlin, (Graceland University Press, 2004) “Theology 10: Theologies of Scripture” (Graceland University Press, 2002) with Shandra Newcom-Wolsey, and "Empire and the Christian Tradition" (Augsburg Fortress Press) with Kwok Pui Lan and Joerg Rieger. The latter was named best reference work published in 2007 by the Academy of Parish Clergy. Compier served as a member of the select Workgroup on Constructive Christian Theology from 2000 to 2016.
