= Joerg Rieger =

German theologian and Methodist minister (born 1963)

The Reverend Joerg Rieger
- Born: August 3, 1963 (age 63)
- Spouse: Rosemarie Henkel-Rieger

Ecclesiastical career
- Religion: Christianity (Methodist)
- Church: United Methodist Church
- Ordained: 1995 (deacon); 1997 (elder)

Academic background
- Education: Theologische Hochschule Reutlingen; Duke University
- Thesis: Approaches to the Real (1994)

Academic work
- Discipline: Theology
- Sub-discipline: Constructive theology
- School or tradition: Christian socialism; liberation theology
- Institutions: Southern Methodist University; Vanderbilt University Wendland-Cook Program in Religion and Justice at Vanderbilt University
- Website: joergrieger.com

Joerg Michael Rieger (born 1963) is a German and American professor of Christian theology whose work emphasizes economic justice and political movements. Rieger is also an ordained minister of the United Methodist Church.

== Life and career ==
Born on August 3, 1963, Rieger is Cal Turner Chancellor's Chair in Wesleyan Studies and Distinguished Professor of Theology at the Divinity School and the Graduate Program of Religion at Vanderbilt University. He is the founding director of the Wendland-Cook Program in Religion and Justice at Vanderbilt Divinity School. Previously he was the Wendland-Cook Endowed Professor of Constructive Theology at Perkins School of Theology, Southern Methodist University. He received a Master of Divinity degree from the Theologische Hochschule Reutlingen, Germany, a Master of Theology degree from Duke Divinity School, and a Doctor of Philosophy degree in religion and ethics from Duke University.

Rieger is the author and editor of more than 27 books and over 210 academic articles, which have been translated into Portuguese, Spanish, Italian, Croatian, German, Polish, Korean, Chinese, and Malayalam.https://divinity.vanderbilt.edu/bio/joerg-rieger/

Rieger is editor of the academic book series New Approaches to Religion and Power with Palgrave Macmillan Publishers and, together with Kwok Pui-lan, he edits the academic book series Religion in the Modern World (Rowman and Littlefield).

Rieger has lectured throughout the United States as well as internationally, including presentations in Argentina, Brazil, Costa Rica, Mexico, Canada, South Africa, Zimbabwe, Germany, Switzerland, Austria, Slovakia, the Netherlands, Belgium, England, Russia, Thailand, and China.

== Ideas ==
Rieger is an activist constructive theologian in the tradition of liberation theology. Robert Wafawanaka has referred to Rieger as an "Occupy theologian" because he endorses the views of the Occupy movement and shares its ethos. Rieger understands theology as functioning to support or transform reality, especially historical and contemporary economic systems. His work focuses on economic class and empire. In politics, Rieger argues that religion and politics cannot easily be separated.

Rieger describes his work as an effort to bring theology and contemporary liberation movements together. His work addresses the relation of theology and public life, reflecting on the misuse of power in religion, politics, and economics. (Note: See, e.g., Rieger 2010, p. 30.) His main interest is in developments and movements that bring about change and in the positive contributions of religion and theology. His work in theology draws on a wide range of historical and contemporary traditions, with a concern for manifestations of the divine in the pressures of everyday life.

Rieger advocates for a materialistic spirituality centered on working to improve the material conditions of the marginalized. He believes current economic systems are incompatible with the biblical conception of God. Rieger has described economic ideologies as religions, and asserts that people typically assent to them as a matter of blind faith, not empirical evidence. He renounces the perceived hegemony of free market ideology offering Christian theology as an alternative.

Rieger's criticizes the currently dominant economic system especially for increasing global economic inequality, and also for poverty, distorting of the way people and their work are valued, and limiting control people have over their lives. As a response to economic injustice, Rieger promotes solidarity with those negatively impacted by current economic processes and encourages Christians to modify economic systems to promote the wellbeing of everyone.

Rieger and Kwok Pui-lan coined the notion of deep solidarity, which is a recognition that the community as a whole is harmed by the unjust system, not just a particular group to be paternalistically supported from a place of superiority or distance. Within this framework, the presence of college-educated individuals participating in the Occupy movement is not lack of authenticity in their appeal for economic justice, but rather an achievement in helping a broader portion of the public identify themselves as oppressed and able to see inequality as a threat to society as whole.

== Published works ==
=== Books authored ===
- Theology in the Capitalocene. Ecology, Identity, Class, and Solidarity. Minneapolis: Fortress Press, 2022
- Jesus vs. Caesar: For People Tired of Serving the Wrong God. Nashville: Abingdon Press, 2018.
- No Religion but Social Religion: Liberating Wesleyan Theology. With Contributions by Paulo Ayres Mattos, Helmut Renders, and José Carlos de Souza. Nashville: GBHEM, 2018.
- Unified We Are a Force: How Faith and Labor Can Overcome America’s Inequalities. With Rosemarie Henkel-Rieger. Saint Louis, Mo.: Chalice Press, 2016.
- Faith on the Road: A Short Theology of Travel and Justice. Downers Grove, Ill.: InterVarsity Press, 2015.
- Graça libertadora: como o metodismo pode se envolver no século vinte e um. (Liberating Grace: How Methodism Can Engage the Twenty-First Century.) With additional contributions by Helmut Renders, José Carlos de Souza, and Paulo Ayres Mattos. Portuguese only, translated from the English by Elizangela A. Soares. São Bernardo do Campo, SP: Editeo, 2015.
- with Pui-lan, K. (2012). Occupy Religion: Theology of the Multitude. Religion in the Modern World. Lanham, MD: Rowman & Littlefield Publishers. ISBN 978-1-4422-1793-5. Chinese Translation (transl. by Jenny Wong Yan). Hong Kong: Chinese Christian Literature Council, 2015.
- Traveling: Christian Explorations of Daily Living. Minneapolis: Fortress Press, 2011. Portuguese translation: Fé e viagens no mundo globalizado (transl. by José Raimundo Vidigal). São Paulo: Editora Paulus, 2014. Chinese Translation (transl. by Jane Ng). Hong Kong: Chinese Christian Literature Council, 2014. Korean Translation. Seoul: Poiema, an imprint of Gimm-Young Publishers, 2015.
- Grace Under Pressure: Negotiating the Heart of the Methodist Tradition. Nashville: United Methodist General Board of Higher Education and Ministry. 2011. ISBN 978-0-938162-77-3. Portuguese translation: Graça sob Pressão: Negociando o Coração das Tradições Metodistas (transl. by Felipe Maia). São Bernardo do Campo: Editeo, 2012. Spanish translation: Gracia bajo presión (transl. by Alejandro Alfaro-Santi). Buenos Aires: Ediciones La Aurora, 2016.
- Globalization and Theology. Horizons in theology. Abingdon Press. 2010. ISBN 978-1-4267-0065-1. Italian translation: Globalizzazione e Teologia (transl. by Andrea Aguti). Preface by Rosino Gibellini. Brescia: Editrice Queriniana, 2015.
- No Rising Tide: Theology, Economics, and the Future. Minneapolis: Fortress Press. 2009. ISBN 978-1-4514-1112-6. Spanish Translation: La religion del Mercado: Una aproximación crítica a la acumulación y la probreza (transl. and ed. by Néstor Míguez). Buenos Aires: Ediciones La Aurora, 2016.
- Beyond the Spirit of Empire: Theology and Politics in a New Key. Reclaiming Liberation Theology Series. Co-authored with Néstor Míguez and Jung Mo Sung. London: SCM Press, 2009. Portuguese translation: Para além do espírito do Império: Novas perspectivas em política e religião (transl. by Gilmar Saint’ Clair Ribeiro and Barbara T. Lambert). São Paulo: Paulinas, 2012. Spanish translation: Más allá del espiritu imperial: Nuevas perspectivas en política y religión (transl. by Nicolás Panotto and Néstor Míguez). Prologo de F. Hinkelammert. Buenos Aires: Ediciones La Aurora, 2016.
- Christ & Empire: From Paul to Postcolonial Times. Minneapolis: Fortress Press. 2007. ISBN 978-0-8006-2038-7. German translation: Christus und das Imperium: Von Paulus bis zum Postkolonialismus (transl. by Sabine Plonz). Berlin: Lit Verlag, 2009.Portuguese translation: Cristo e Império: de Paulo aos tempos pós-coloniais, Coleção Bíblia e Sociologia (transl. by Luiz Alexandre Solano Rossi). São Paulo: Editora Paulus, 2009.
- God and the Excluded: Visions and Blind Spots in Contemporary Theology. Minneapolis: Fortress Press. 2001. ISBN 978-1-4514-1110-2.
- Remember the Poor: The Challenge to Theology in the Twenty-First Century. Harrisburg: Trinity Press International. 1998. ISBN 978-1-56338-256-7. Portuguese translation: Lembrar-se dos Pobres: o desafio da teologia no século XXI (transl. by Thiago Gambi). São Paulo: Edições Loyola, 2009.

=== Books edited ===
- Religious Experience and New Materialism: Movements Matter. Co-editor with Edward Waggoner. Radical Theologies Series. New York: Palgrave Macmillan, 2015.
- Religion, Theology, and Class: Fresh Engagements after Long Silence. New Approaches to Religion and Power. New York: Palgrave Macmillan US. 2013. ISBN 978-1-137-33924-9.
- Across Borders: Latin Perspectives in the Americas Reshaping Religion, Theology, and Life. Editor. Lanham, MD: Lexington Books, 2013.
- Empire and the Christian Tradition: New Readings of Classical Theologians. Co-editor, with Don Compier and Kwok Pui Lan. Minneapolis: Fortress Press, 2007.
- Encyclopedia of Activism and Social Justice. Associate Editor. Thousand Oaks, Calif.: Sage Publications, 2007.
- Opting for the Margins: Postmodernity and Liberation in Christian Theology. American Academy of Religion, Reflection and Theory in the Study of Religion Series. Editor. Oxford: Oxford University Press, 2003.
- Methodist and Radical: Rejuvenating a Tradition. Co-editor with John Vincent. Nashville: Kingswood Books, 2003.
- Theology from the Belly of the Whale: A Frederick Herzog Reader. Editor. Harrisburg: Trinity Press International, 1999.
- Liberating the Future: God, Mammon, and Theology. Editor. Minneapolis: Fortress Press, 1998.

== See also ==
- Christianity and politics
