= We Dare to Dream =

1989 theology book

We Dare to Dream: Doing Theology as Asian Women
- Editor: Sun Ai Lee Park, Virginia Fabella
- Genre: Non-fiction
- Publication date: 1989

We Dare to Dream: Doing Theology as Asian Women is a 1989 non-fiction book about women using theology in Asian countries.

== Summary ==
The book collects essays based on theology that were edited by Korean minister Sun Ai Lee Park and Filipina theologian Virginia Fabella. The essays are all about Asian woman and theology. An introduction from the editors states, "More recently, Christian women have become aware that without their distinctive voices as Asians and as women, the emerging theologies in Asia cannot be liberating or relevant, not for themselves or for the Church or society at large". Asian women theologists typically focus on "theology that is relevant to the Asian context". According to the editors, that theology is "marked with poverty and is dominated by patriarchal institutions" and also "characterized by the diversity of religions and cultures". The book is in three parts which are Reworking Theological Themes, Reflecting on Asian Realities, and Doing Theology as Asian Women. It has writings from "first and second generation Asian women theologians". The writings are by women from the Philippines, India, Taiwan, Hong Kong, Malaysia, Korea, and Singapore.

A review of in the journal Horizons wrote that the book "represents years of struggle and pain, years of searching for identity; years of conversation together as women who dare to dream of a New Creation in which women are full partners together with men". The book was also reviewed by the journal Pacifica.
