= Muriel Orevillo-Montenegro =

Filipina theologian

Muriel Orevillo-Montenegro (born 1954) is a Filipina theologian known for her writings in Asian feminist theology. She is a Human Rights activist and Peace and Justice advocate.

== Biography ==
Orevillo-Montenegro's parents and grandparents were amongst the first generation of Protestant converts in the Philippines.

She first pursued a pre-medical studies course, but due to financial strains, switched to political science. However, due to her father's death, she was unable to complete her second choice of studies. She later returned to studies and completed undergraduate degrees in animal husbandry and catechism in Silliman University in 1979. After graduation, she worked as a youth worker for the United Church of Christ in the Philippines. She became a full time pastor of United Church of Christ in the Philippines in 1980.

In 1994, when she finished Master of Divinity, she began teaching at the Divinity School of Silliman University. She later went for further studies at Union Theological Seminary in New York and received an S.T.M. in 1999 and a Ph.D. in 2003. In 2007, She was appointed and became the first female Dean of Silliman University Divinity School.

In 2018, she was appointed the Coordinator of Interfaith Cooperation Forum, based in the Asia and Pacific Alliance of YMCAs (APAY) in Hong Kong.

== Theology ==
Orevillo-Montenegro is best known for her writings in Asian feminist theology. She published the book The Jesus of Asian Women, to highlight the areas where Western Christologies are insufficient for Asian women. This book looks at feminist Christologies from South Korea to speak about creation care, Filipina Christologies to discuss liberation theologies, and Hong Kong Christologies and the use of postcolonial theology.

Elsewhere, she has critiqued the dominant popular Christologies in the Philippines of Sinulog and the Black Nazarene, and spoken about the need to reclaim the doctrine of the Incarnation for Asian women.

== Publication ==
- Orevillo-Montenegro, Muriel (2010). The Jesus of Asian Women. Concept Publishing Company. ISBN 978-81-7268-198-2.
- Orevillo-Montenegro, Muriel ad Gordon Zerbe. "The Letter to The Colossians." In A Postcolonial Commentary on the New Testament Writings, edited by Fernando F. Segovia and R.S. Sugirtharajah, 294-303. London: T & T Clark, 2007. ISBN 9780567045638
- Orevillo-Montenegro, Muriel and Limuel Equiña. “Theological Education among the Protestant Schools in the Philippines: Retrospect and Prospect.” In Training to be Ministers in Asia: Contextualizing Theological Education in Multi-faith Contexts. Edited by Dietrich Werner. Taiwan: Program for Theology and Cultures in Asia, 2012.
