= Won-hee =

- Hangul: 원희
- RR: Wonhui
- MR: Wŏnhŭi

Won-hee (Korean: 원희) is a Korean given name. As of 2026, the name ranked 924th out of 36,179 male names and 844th out of 28,726 female names. A total of 665 people, consisting of 363 males and 302 females, were born with the name from 2008 to 2026.

Notable people with the name include:

- Wonhee, birth name Lee Won-hee, South Korean singer and idol and member of Illit
- Lee Won-hee, South Korean quadruple judo champion
- Wonhee Anne Joh, South Korean author
- Cho Won-hee, South Korean former professional footballer
- Go Won-hee, South Korean actress
- Im Won-hee, South Korean actor
- Kim Won-hee, South Korean television presenter and actress

== See also ==
- List of Korean given names
