= Wai-Ching Angela Wong =

Hong Kong academic (born 1959)

Wai-Ching Angela Wong (Chinese: 黃慧貞; born 15 November 1959) is a Hong Kong scholar of Asian feminist theology. She is the Vice President for Programs at the United Board for Christian Higher Education in Asia since 2016.

== Biography ==
Growing up in Hong Kong, Wong received a BA from the Chinese University of Hong Kong in 1985, a BD from South East Asia Graduate School of Theology in 1989, and an MA (1991) and PhD (1997) in Religious Studies from University of Chicago Divinity School. Her PhD thesis was later published as "The Poor Woman": A Critical Analysis of Asian Theology and Contemporary Chinese Fiction by Women (2002). In 2000, she began teaching at the Chinese University of Hong Kong, first in Chung Chi College before eventually moving to the Department of Cultural and Religious Studies. In 2016, she joined the United Board for Christian Higher Education in Asia as Vice President for Programs.

Wong is known as a pioneer of Asian feminist theology, drawing on postcolonial theology.

== Works ==
- Wai-Ching Angela Wong (2002). The Poor Woman: A Critical Analysis of Asian Theology and Contemporary Chinese Fiction by Women. Peter Lang. ISBN 978-0-8204-4899-2.
- Tam, Siumi Maria; Wong, Wai-Ching Angela; Wang, Danning, eds. (2014). Gender and Family in East Asia. Routledge. ISBN 978-1-134-73887-8.
- Wong, Wai-Ching Angela; Chiu, Patricia P. K., eds. (2018). Christian Women in Chinese Society: The Anglican Story. Hong Kong University Press. ISBN 978-988-8455-92-8.
