= Biblical hermeneutics =

Biblical hermeneutics is the study of the principles of interpretation concerning the books of the Bible. It is part of the broader field of hermeneutics, which involves the study of principles of interpretation, both theory and methodology, for all nonverbal and verbal communication forms. While Jewish and Christian biblical hermeneutics have some overlap and dialogue, they have distinctly separate interpretative traditions.

== Jewish ==
=== Traditional ===
Talmudical hermeneutics (Hebrew: approximately, מידות שהתורה נדרשת בהן) refers to Jewish methods for the investigation and determination of the meaning of the Hebrew Bible, as well as rules by which Jewish law could be established. One well-known summary of these principles appears in the Baraita of Rabbi Ishmael.

Methods by which the Talmud explores the meaning of scripture:

- grammar and exegesis
- the interpretation of certain words and letters and apparently superfluous or missing words or letters, and prefixes and suffixes
- the interpretation of those letters which, in certain words, are provided with points
- the interpretation of the letters in a word according to their numerical value
- the interpretation of a word by dividing it into two or more words
- the interpretation of a word according to its consonantal form or according to its vocalization
- the interpretation of a word by transposing its letters or by changing its vowels
- the logical deduction of a halakha from a Scriptural text or from another law

The rabbis of the Talmud considered themselves to be the receivers and transmitters of an Oral Torah as to the meaning of the scriptures. They considered this oral tradition to set forth the precise, original meanings of the words, revealed at the same time and by the same means as the original scriptures themselves. Interpretive methods listed above such as word play and letter counting were never used as logical proof of the meaning or teaching of a scripture. Instead they were considered to be an asmachta, a validation of a meaning that was already set by tradition or a homiletic backing for rabbinic rulings.

=== Biblical source criticism ===
Among non-Orthodox Jews, there is growing interest in employing biblical source criticism, such as the documentary hypothesis and the supplementary hypothesis, for constructing modern Jewish theology, including the following objectives:

- Reconciling modern morals with biblical passages that condone morally problematic acts, such as genocide and other collective punishment
- Rejecting or accepting folkways, social norms, and linguistic trends, picking and choosing as more fully informed Jews
- Learning lessons in spite of biblical underrepresentation, or outright exclusion, of particular modern phenomena

To at least some extent, this is an application of Talmudical hermeneutics to traditional source criticism of the competing Torah schools: priestly, deuteronomic, and one, two, or more that are non-priestly and non-deuteronomic.

== Christian ==
There are at least two different but related meanings in use today:

Firstly, in the older sense, 'biblical hermeneutics' may be understood as the theological principles of exegesis which is often synonymous with 'principles of biblical interpretation' or methodology of biblical exegesis.

Secondly, 'biblical hermeneutics' may be understood as the broader philosophy and linguistic underpinnings of interpretation. The question is posed: "How is understanding possible?" The rationale of this approach is that, while Scripture is "more than just an ordinary text", it is certainly "no less than an ordinary text". Scripture is in the first analysis "text" which human beings try to understand; in this sense, the principles of understanding any text apply to the Bible as well (regardless of whatever other additional, specifically theological principles are considered).

In this second sense, all aspects of philosophical and linguistic hermeneutics are considered to be applicable to the biblical texts, as well. There are examples of this in the links between 20th-century philosophy and Christian theology. For example, Rudolf Bultmann's hermeneutical approach was strongly influenced by existentialism, and in particular by the philosophy of Martin Heidegger; and since the 1970s, the philosophical hermeneutics of Hans-Georg Gadamer have had a wide-ranging influence on biblical hermeneutics as developed by a wide range of Christian theologians. The French-American philosopher René Girard follows a similar trail.

=== Denominational differences ===
==== Protestant ====
Biblical scholars have noted the diversity of interpretations by Protestants and to a lesser extent by Catholics. In his foreword to R. C. Sproul’s Knowing Scripture, J. I. Packer observes that Protestant theologians are in conflict about biblical interpretation. To illustrate the diversity of biblical interpretations, William Yarchin pictures a shelf full of religious books saying different things but all claiming to be faithful interpretations of the Bible. Bernard Ramm observes that such diverse interpretations underlie the doctrinal variations in Christendom. A mid-19th century book on biblical interpretation observes that even those who believe the Bible to be the word of God hold the most discordant views about fundamental doctrines.

Until the late Enlightenment, biblical hermeneutics was usually seen as a form of special hermeneutics (like legal hermeneutics); the status of scripture was thought to necessitate a particular form of understanding and interpretation. In the 19th century it became increasingly common to read scripture just like any other writing, although the different interpretations were often disputed. Friedrich Schleiermacher argued against a distinction between "general" and "special" hermeneutics, and for a general theory of hermeneutics applicable to all texts, including the Bible. Various methods of higher criticism sought to understand the Bible purely as a human, historical document. On the other hand, Evangelical Protestant author Roy B. Zuck held that "no-one can fully comprehend the meaning of the scripture unless he is regenerate."

==== Catholic ====
The Catholic Church asserts the capital importance of biblical interpretation, and Catholic scholars recognize some diversity in the Bible. The Second Vatican Council's Dogmatic Constitution, Dei verbum, notes the Bible's various literary forms include "historical, prophetic, poetic, [and] other forms of discourse", and directs scholars to pay "attention" to this variety of forms. Teaching allows for an openness of interpretation as long as it stays within the Catholic Church's theological tradition.

Pope Benedict XVI in Verbum Domini encourages the "faith-filled interpretation of Sacred Scripture" that has been "practiced from antiquity within the Church’s Tradition ... (and) recognizes the historical value of the biblical tradition. ... (It) seeks to discover the living meaning of the Sacred Scriptures for the lives of believers today while not ignoring the human mediation of the inspired text and its literary genres...(Christianity) perceives in the words the Word himself, the Logos who displays his mystery through this complexity and the reality of human history."

An early text dealing with wildly divergent interpretations of important biblical passages is Irenaeus (c. 180) whose Against Heresies has that the Valentinians

by transferring passages, and dressing them up anew, and making one thing out of another, they succeed in deluding many through their wicked art in adapting the oracles of the Lord to their opinions. Their manner of acting is just as if one, when a beautiful image of a king has been constructed by some skilful artist out of precious jewels, should then take this likeness of the man all to pieces, then rearrange the gems, and so fit them together as to make them into the form of a dog or of a fox (even that but poorly executed); and then maintain and declare that this was the beautiful image of the king which the skilful artist constructed...

— Against Heresies, Chapter 8

Irenaeus' prescription for this was that hermeneutics must at least accord with received apostolic tradition, specifically an early creed:

the Church, having received this preaching and this faith, although scattered throughout the whole world, yet, as if occupying but one house, carefully preserves it. She also believes these points just as if she had but one soul, and one and the same heart, and she proclaims them, and teaches them, and hands them down, with perfect harmony, as if she possessed only one mouth. For, although the languages of the world are dissimilar, yet the import of the tradition is one and the same. .

— Against Heresies, Chapter 10

According to the 1914 Catholic Encyclopedia, the Catholic Church is the official custodian and interpreter of the Bible. Therefore, Catholicism's teaching concerning the Sacred Scriptures and their genuine sense must be the supreme guide of the commentator. The Catholic commentator is bound to adhere to the interpretation of texts which the Church has defined either expressly or implicitly. Furthermore, the Church Fathers are of supreme authority whenever they all interpret in one and the same manner any text of the Bible, as pertaining to the doctrine of faith or morals; for their unanimity clearly evinces that such interpretation has come down from the Apostles as a matter of Catholic faith.

Catholic humanist scholars of the Renaissance such as Lorenzo Valla and Erasmus emphasized the role of philology and genre as the foundation of hermeneutics.

==== Orthodox ====
Orthodox hermeneutic principles include

- Everything pertaining to the Scriptures must be understood Christologically
- Understanding of the Scripture comes with living its contents
- We must have humility when approaching Scripture

=== Layers of meaning ===
Christian biblical hermeneutics considers the original medium as well as what language says, supposes, does not say, and implies. David L. Barr states there are three obstacles that stand in the way of correctly interpreting the biblical writings:

- we speak a different language
- we live approximately two millennia later
- we bring different expectations to the text

Additionally, Barr suggests that one approaches the reading of the Bible with significantly different literary expectations than those in reading other forms of literature and writing.

Vern Poythress identifies three general concepts to understand about any passage of Scripture:

- First, the original time and context, which includes the personal perspective of the writer, the normative perspective of the text, and the situational perspective of the original audience.
- Second, it is necessary to understand that the transmission of Scripture includes contemplating the message being sent through the text, taking into account the concerns of individual writers/translators as well as its broader role in the unraveling narrative of history.
- Finally, Poythress instructs interpreters to understand Scripture as "what God is saying now" to the individual as well as to the modern church.

Henry A. Virkler argues that there are several types of analysis needed to identify what the author intended to communicate in a biblical passage:

- Lexical-syntactical analysis: This step looks at the words used and the way the words are used. Different order of the sentence, the punctuation (if any), the tense of a verse are all aspects examined in the lexical syntactical method. Here, lexicons and grammar-aids can help in extracting meaning from the text.
- Historical/cultural analysis: An understanding of the history and culture surrounding the authors is important to aid in interpretation. For instance, understanding the Jewish sects of Roman-era Palestine and the government that ruled Palestine in New Testament times increases understanding of Scripture. Understanding the connotations of positions such as that of the High Priest and that of a tax collector helps readers know what others thought of the people holding these positions.
- Contextual analysis: A verse out of context can often be taken to mean something completely different from the intention. This method focuses on the importance of looking at the context of a verse in its chapter, book and general biblical context.
- Theological analysis: It is often said that a single verse usually doesn't make a theology. This is because Scripture often touches on issues in several books. For instance, gifts of the Spirit appear in Romans, Ephesians and 1 Corinthians. To take a verse from Corinthians without taking into account other passages that deal with the same topic can lead to a poor interpretation.
- Special literary analysis: There are several special literary aspects to look at, but the overarching theme is that each genre of Scripture has a different set of rules that applies to it. Genres found in Scripture include narratives, histories, prophecies, apocalyptic writings, poetry, psalms and letters. In these, there are differing levels of allegory, figurative language, metaphors, similes and literal language. For instance, the apocalyptic writings and poetry have more figurative and allegorical language than does the narrative or historical writing. These must be addressed, and the genre recognized, to gain a full understanding of the intended meaning.

Furthermore, Poythress argues that the study of the Bible must acknowledge three dimensions: God as the speaker, the Bible as His speech, and the people to whom He speaks. Thus biblical hermeneutics needs to unravel the layers of meaning found within the "speaker, discourse, and hearer". For some, such as Howard Hendricks and Chuck Swindoll, this can be as simple as taking three steps: observing the text, interpreting the text, and applying the text to one's life.

=== Reader's context ===
There is a recognition that the context of the reader has a relationship with one's approach to the Bible. In part, this is related to the presuppositions every reader brings to the Bible, no matter how objective they may try to be.

Scholars such as Vincent L. Wimbush, Fernando F. Segovia, R. S. Sugirtharajah, Mary Ann Tolbert, and Miguel A. De La Torre have argued that the dominant readings of the Bible are influenced by Eurocentric presuppositions, which have produced racially inflected understandings of Christianity and Christian theology. As a corrective, some have spoken of prioritizing social location, especially in terms of minority populations in the United States. This often draws on postcolonial or liberative methods for re-reading the Bible.

Other scholars see this as too extreme and based on mainline liberal concerns. In contrast, Asian American evangelicals have established a research group within the Institute for Biblical Research to develop an alternative. Likewise, Esau McCaulley argues that everyone comes to Scripture with different life experiences and cultures which help to point out the blind spots in each other's reading. Instead of the focus on Black political liberation, McCaulley wants to recover a "Black ecclesial interpretation" coming out of the experience of the African American church.

=== Trajectory hermeneutics ===
Trajectory hermeneutics or redemptive-movement hermeneutics is a hermeneutical approach that seeks to locate varying 'voices' in the text and to view these voices as a progressive trajectory through history (or at least through the biblical witness); often a trajectory that progresses through to the present day. The contemporary reader of Scripture is in some way envisaged by the biblical text as standing in continuity with a developing theme therein. The reader, then, is left to discern this trajectory and appropriate it accordingly.

William J. Webb, employing trajectory hermeneutics, shows how the moral commands of the Old and New Testaments were a significant improvement over the surrounding cultural values and practices. Webb identifies 18 different ways in which God dealt with his people moving against the current of popular cultural values. While for Webb the use of this hermeneutic moves to highlight the progressive liberation of women and slaves from oppressive male/bourgeois dominance, the prohibition of homosexual acts consistently moves in a more conservative manner than that of the surrounding Ancient Near East or Graeco-Roman societies. Webb argues that, while Paul does not explicitly state that slavery should be abolished, the trajectory seen in Scripture is a progressive liberation of slaves. In his view, when this is extended to modern times, it implies that the biblical witness supports the abolition of slavery. The progressive liberation of women from oppressive patriarchalism, traced from Genesis and Exodus through to Paul's own acknowledgement of women as 'co-workers' (Rom. 16:3), sets a precedent that when applied to modern times suggests that women ought to have the same rights and roles afforded to men. Historically, the biblical witness has become progressively more stringent in its views of homosexual practice and the implications of this are not commented upon by Webb.
