= Grace Ji-Sun Kim =

American theologian and Professor of Theology

- Born: May 4, 1969 (age 57); Seoul, South Korea

Education
- Education: University of Toronto (BSc, MDiv, PhD)

Philosophical work
- Era: 21st-century philosophy
- Region: Western philosophy
- School: Protestant theology, Third-wave feminism, Post-colonial theory
- Main interests: Feminist theory, Constructive theology

Grace Ji-Sun Kim (born May 4, 1969) is a Canadian-American theologian and Professor of Theology at Earlham School of Religion, Richmond, Indiana. She is best known for books and articles on the social and religious experiences of Korean women immigrants to North America.

== Early life ==
Kim was born on May 4, 1969, in Seoul, South Korea. She immigrated with her family to London, Ontario in 1975.

== Academic life ==
Kim earned a B.Sc. in Psychology from Victoria College at the University of Toronto, a Master of Divinity degree from Knox College, University of Toronto in 1995, and a Ph.D. in Systematic Theology from the University of St. Michael's College, University of Toronto in 2001.

Kim served on the faculty of Moravian Theological Seminary in Bethlehem, PA from fall 2004 to July 2013. During her time at Moravian, she was promoted to Associate Professor in 2010 and served two terms as Director of the MATS program. Kim was ordained in the Presbyterian Church (USA) on November 13, 2011. She is currently Professor of Theology at Earlham School of Religion in Richmond, Indiana.

Kim received a sabbatical grant for researchers from the Louisville Institute in 2020.

Currently, Kim is Professor of Theology at the Earlham School of Religion. She is the author or editor of over 20 books, most recently, When God Became White; Hope in Disarray; Keeping Hope Alive; Reimagining Spirit; Spirit Life; and Intersectional Theology co-written with Susan Shaw. She is the co-editor of the book series 'Asian Christianity in the Diaspora', published by Palgrave Macmillan.

Kim served on the Board of Directors for the American Academy of Religion as an At-Large Director. She served on the American Academy of Religion’s (AAR) "Research Grants Jury Committee" and was co-chair of AAR’s steering committee, "Women of Color Scholarship, Teaching and Activism Group". She sits on the editorial board for the Journal of Religion and Popular Culture and is currently a referee for these two Journals: Journal of Race, Ethnicity, and Religion and Journal of Religion and Popular Culture; and was a referee for The Global Studies Journal.

Grace Ji-Sun Kim has appeared on MSNBC, PBS and C-Span. She has been a guest on BBC Radio, Soul Search Radio, WBEZ Radio, and Keeping Hope Alive Radio. Kim writes for Faith and Leadership, The Christian Century, Sojourners, Good Faith Media, Wabash Center, Baptist News Global, Spirituality and Health Magazine, and Feminist Studies in Religion (co-editor). Kim has published in TIME (magazine), The Huffington Post, The Feminist Wire, Feminism and Religion, The Forum for Theological Education, 99 Brattle, and The Nation.

== Personal life ==
Kim is the host of the Madang podcast, sponsored by The Christian Century. On the podcast, she leads discussions on topics related to religion and culture, which can be seen as a "virtual" madang or world's outdoor living room.

== Selected publications ==
- 2025: Earthbound: God at the Intersection of Climate and Justice, Maryknoll: Orbis Books.
- 2025: Feminist Theology: The Basics, co-written with Susan M. Shaw, London: Routledge.
- 2024: Pneumatologies in Global Perspective: Approaches to Understanding the Holy Spirit, with Stephen Angell, Lanham: Lexington Books.
- 2024: When God Became White: Dismantling Whiteness for a More Just Christianity, Westmont: IVP.
- 2024: Surviving God: A New Vision of God through the Eyes of Sexual Abuse Survivors, co-written with Susan M. Shaw, Minneapolis: Broadleaf Books.
- 2023: Christianity in North America (vol 7) for 10 Volume Series, Edinburgh Companions to Global Christianity, co-edited with Todd Johnson & Kenneth R. Ross, Edinburgh: Edinburgh University Press.
- 2022: Spirit Life, London: Darton, Longman and Todd.
- 2021: Invisible: Theology and the Experience of Asian American Women, Minneapolis: Fortress Press.
- 2020: Hope in Disarray: Piecing our Lives Together in Faith, Cleveland: The Pilgrim Press.
- 2019: Reimagining Spirit: Light, Wind and Vibration, Eugene: Cascade.
- 2019: Keeping Hope Alive: Sermons and Speeches of Rev. Jesse Jackson, Maryknoll: Orbis Books.
- 2018: Intersectional Theology: An Introductory Guide, with Susan Shaw, Minneapolis: Fortress Press.
- 2018:The Homebrewed Christianity Guide to the Holy Spirit: Hand-Raisers, Han, and the Holy Ghost, Fortress Press
- 2018: Healing Our Broken Humanity: Practices for Revitalizing the Church and Renewing the World. InterVarsity Press. ISBN 978-0-8308-4541-5
- 2017: Planetary Solidarity: Global Women’s Voices on Doctrine and Climate Justice, co-edited with Hilda Koster, Minneapolis: Fortress Press.
- 2017: Intercultural Ministry: Hope for a Changing World, co-edited with Jann Aldredge-Clanton, Valley Forge: Judson Press.
- 2017: Mother Daughter Speak: Lessons on Life. FAR Press. ISBN 978-0-99896-7509
- 2016: Making Peace with the Earth: Action and Advocacy for Climate Justice, Geneva: World Council of Churches Publications.
- 2015: Embracing the Other: The Transformative Spirit of Love. Grand Rapids: W.B. Eerdmans. ISBN 978-0-80287-299-9
- 2015: Christian Doctrines for Global Gender Justice, co-edited with Jenny Daggers, New York: Palgrave Macmillan.
- 2015: Here I Am: Faith Stories of Korean American Clergywomen, Valley Forge: Judson Press.
- 2014: Reimagining with Christian Doctrines: Responding to Global Gender Injustices, co-edited with Jenny Daggers, New York: Palgrave Macmillan.
- 2013: Colonialism, Han, and the Transformative Spirit, A Palgrave Pivot Book ISBN 978-1-137-34668-1
- 2013: Proper 13 for Year A, in Preaching God's Transformative Justice: A Lectionary Commentary, With 22 Holy Days of Justice, edited by Ron Lewis, Dale P. Andrews & Dawn Ottoni-Wilhelm (Louisville: Westminster John Knox Press)
- 2012: Proper 13 for Year C, in Preaching God's Transformative Justice: A Lectionary Commentary, With 22 Holy Days of Justice, edited by Ron Lewis, Dale P. Andrews & Dawn Ottoni-Wilhelm (Louisville: Westminster John Knox Press)
- 2012: A Perspective on Ezra, Global Perspectives on the Bible, edited by Mark Roncace & Joseph Weaver (Upper Saddle River: Prentice Hall) ()
- 2012: Uriah, Dictionary of the Bible and Western Culture, co-edited by Michael Gilmour & Mary Ann Beavis (Sheffield: Sheffield Phoenix Press) ()
- 2011: The Holy Spirit, Chi, and the Other: A Model of Global and Intercultural Pneumatology : ISBN 978-0-230-12030-3
- 2011: Jürgen Moltmann, in Beyond the Pale: Reading Christian Theology from the Margins, edited by Miguel De La Torre & Stacey M. Floyd-Thomas (Louisville: Westminster John Knox Press)
- 2011: Feasting on the Word, Year A,: Season After Pentecost 2, contributor : ISBN 978-0-664-23107-1
- 2011: Proper 13 for Year B, in Preaching God's Transformative Justice: A Lectionary Commentary, With 22 Holy Days of Justice, edited by Ron Lewis, Dale P. Andrews & Dawn Ottoni Wilhelm (Louisville: Westminster John Knox Press) (contributor)
- 2011: Three Theological Commentaries on 1 Thessalonians 2:1–8, 1 John 3:1–3 & 1 Thessalonians 2:9–13 in Feasting on the Word, Year A: Season After Pentecost 2, Volume XII, edited by David L. Bartlett & Barbara Brown Taylor (Louisville: Westminster John Knox Press) (contributor)
- 2010: The Grace of Sophia: A Korean North American Women's Christology : ISBN 978-1-60899-213-3
- 2010: Asian American Feminist Theology, in Liberation Theologies in the United States: An Introduction edited by Anthony Pinn & Stacey M. Floyd-Thomas (New York: New York University Press, 2010), 131–148
- 2008: What Forms Us: Multiculturalism, the Other and Theology, in Feminist Theology With A Canadian Accent: Canadian Perspectives on Contextual Theology, edited by Mary Ann Beavis, Elaine Guillemin & Barbara Pell (Ottawa: Novalis), 78–99 (contributor)
- 2007: Literary Commentary on Bread for the Journey, by Henri Nouwen, in Masterplots II: Christian Literature, edited by John K. Roth (Pasadena: Salem Press), 215–217 (contributor)
- 2002: The Grace of Sophia: A Korean North American Women's Christology, Cleveland: The Pilgrim Press.

== See also ==
- Asian feminist theology
