= Jeanne Audrey Powers =

Rev. Jeanne Audrey Powers
- Born: July 5, 1932
- Died: September 29, 2017
- Known for: United Methodist activism

Jeanne Audrey Powers (1932–2017) was a leader within The United Methodist Church, an advocate for women and LGBTQ+ people in the church, and one of the first women ordained in the denomination.

== Early life and education ==
Jeanne Audrey Powers grew up in Mankato, Minnesota. After earning her bachelor of science degree from Mankato State University in 1954, she pursued graduate theological studies at Princeton Theological Seminary as a Danforth Graduate Fellow. Her theological studies took her to The University of St. Andrews in Scotland, Boston University School of Theology, and other locations in England and Switzerland.

== Career ==
Powers was ordained as a deacon in the Methodist Church in 1958. She was ordained as an elder in the Methodist Church in 1961, making her one of the first women in the denomination to be granted full clergy status.

Following her ordination, Powers worked with young people as the state director of the Minnesota Methodist Student Movement and as the campus minister for the Wesley Foundation at both the St. Paul and Minneapolis campuses of the University of Minnesota.

In 1968, Powers began working as the Secretary of Missionary Personnel for the Methodist Board of Missions in New York City. In this role, she led the "US-2" program, which provided two-year service opportunities for young adults.

In 1973, Powers took a position with the Board of Global Ministries' Commission on Ecumenical and Interreligious Concerns. In 1981, this organization became an independent General Commission on Christian Unity and Interreligious Concerns. She was instrumental in the planning of the 1993 Re-Imagining Conference, an interfaith Protestant conference that garnered controversy regarding feminist theology, LGBTQ+ affirmation, and the invocation of Sophia. Powers worked at the General Commission on Christian Unity and Interreligious Concerns until her retirement in 1996.

Powers's work as a Methodist leader drew her into both local and global concerns, primarily through the World Council of Churches and the National Council of Churches. As a representative to the World Council of Churches, she participated in three general assemblies and in the creation of "Baptism, Eucharist, and Ministry," an interdenominational document approved in 1982 in Lima, Peru. As an advocate for women in the church, she guided the development of the Ecumenical Decade: Churches in Solidarity with Women 1988–1998.

Powers national work involved her role as the vice president of the National Council of Churches. In this capacity, she spent six years chairing the Faith and Order Commission and then its Commission on Regional and Local Ecumenism.

Powers's local and global work drew attention, particularly within her denomination. In 1972, Powers became the first woman to be nominated for the office of a bishop in The United Methodist Church. She declined this honor in 1972 and 1976, explaining in 1995 that she had not wanted to live "under a magnifying glass" as a not yet out lesbian woman. Powers's activism within the church included volunteering with The United Methodist Commission on the Status and Role of Women and the Reconciling Ministries movement, a network of about 100 United Methodist churches that welcome openly gay and lesbian people.

In 1995, the year before she retired, Powers came out as a lesbian during a sermon she delivered at the national gathering of the Reconciling Ministries Movement, making her the highest-ranking out LGBTQ United Methodist official at the time. In her sermon, she argued that "the whole Christian church is vocationally called to be subversive." Due to the United Methodist Church's non-affirming stance, controversy ensued. The board of directors of a conservative UMC group, Good News, called for disciplinary action to be taken by the UMC against Powers, arguing that her coming-out sermon constituted a violation of the UMC's Book of Discipline.

Upon discussion with UMC executives, Powers released a statement in 1996 indicating her intention to limit her public speaking on LGBTQ+ matters, due to the belief of her colleagues that "it is now difficult to separate my personal statements from those I may make as associate general secretary of the commission."

Powers advocated for the election of Karen Oliveto, the first openly lesbian bishop in The United Methodist Church, who was elected as a bishop in 2016.

Powers donated a founding gift to the Claremont School of Theology's Center for Sexuality, Gender, and Religion.

== Death ==
Powers spent the last 15 years of her life as an activist resident of Pilgrim Place in Claremont, California. She died on September 29, 2017, at the age of 85 while traveling in Switzerland with friends. She was buried in her hometown of Mankato, where her tombstone reads "Subversive to the end."
