= R. S. Sugirtharajah =

Rasiah S. Sugirtharajah, known as R. S. Sugirtharajah, is a biblical hermeneuticist and an emeritus professor at the University of Birmingham. He is known for his work in developing the field of postcolonial biblical criticism.

== Biography ==
Born in Sri Lanka, Sugirtharajah pursued his Bachelor of Divinity and Master of Theology degrees at United Theological College, Bangalore (affiliated to the Senate of Serampore College) in India before completing his Doctor of Philosophy degree at the University of Birmingham in England. He is best known for his work in introducing postcolonial criticism to the study of the Bible, in works such as Asian Biblical Hermeneutics and Postcolonialism and Postcolonial Criticism and Biblical Interpretation. He is also known for bringing to the foreground marginalized voices which are rarely heard in mainstream studies of Christianity.

In 2009, a volume was published in Sugirtharajah's honour entitled Postcolonial Interventions.

== Works ==
- Sugirtharajah, R. S. (1991). Voices from the Margin: Interpreting the Bible in the Third World. London: SPCK. ISBN 978-0-281-04506-8.
- Sugirthharajah, R. S. (1993). Asian Faces of Jesus. Maryknoll, N. Y.: Orbis Books. ISBN 978-0-883-44833-5.
- Sugirtharajah, R. S. (1998). Asian Biblical Hermeneutics and Postcolonialism: Contesting the Interpretations. Maryknoll, New York: Orbis Books. ISBN 978-1-85075-973-7.
- Sugirtharajah, R. S. (2002). Postcolonial Criticism and Biblical Interpretation. Oxford: Oxford University Press. ISBN 978-0-19-875269-1.
- Sugirtharajah, R. S. (2005). The Bible and Empire: Postcolonial Explorations. Cambridge, England: Cambridge University Press. ISBN 978-0-521-82493-4.
- Sugirtharajah, R. S. (2013). The Bible and Asia. Cambridge, Massachusetts: Harvard University Press. ISBN 978-0-674-72646-8.
- Sugirtharajah, R. S. (2018). Jesus in Asia. Cambridge, MA: Harvard University Press. ISBN 978-0-674-05113-3.

== See also ==
- Postcolonial theology
