= Mercy Oduyoye =

Ghanaian theologian (born 1934)

- Born: Mercy Amba Ewudziwa Yamoah; 21 October 1934 (age 91); Ghana, Africa
- Spouse: Adedoyin Modupe Oduyoye (1968)

Academic background
- Education: University of Ghana; Cambridge University

Academic work
- Discipline: African theology, Feminist theology
- School or tradition: Methodist
- Influenced: Black Liberation Theology

Mercy Amba Ewudziwa Oduyoye (née Yamoah; born 21 October 1934) is a Ghanaian Methodist theologian known for her work in African women's theologies and theological anthropology. She is currently the director of the Institute of African Women in Religion and Culture at Trinity Theological Seminary, Ghana. She founded the Circle of Concerned African Theologians in Ghana in 1987 to promote the visibility and publishing agenda of African women theologians.

== Early life ==
Mercy Amba Ewudziwa Oduyoye was born on 21 October 1934 to Akan parents Charles Kwaw Yamoah and Mercy Yaa Dakwaa Yamoah in Brong Asante village. She was born on her grandfather's cocoa farm on Amoanna, near Asamankese, Ghana, as the eldest of nine siblings. The name Ewudziwa is of Akan origin and was given to her in honor of her grandfather.

Her father was an ordained Methodist minister and teacher who became the third President of the Conference Methodist Church in Ghana from 1973 to 1977. Her mother graduated from Wesley Girls School and was an activist for women and children in the church. Oduyoye said that she lives out of her "Christianized Akan background."

== Education ==
Oduyoye attended Mmofraturo, a Methodist girls' boarding school in Kumasi, Ghana, where Biblical courses were required. In 1959, Oduyoye matriculated at the University of Ghana to study theology. She earned her Bachelor of Theology from the University of Ghana in 1963, and continued to the University of Cambridge for her second bachelor's degree (1965) and her Master of Arts degree (1969), both in theology.

Oduyoye has been awarded honorary degrees by the University of Amsterdam (1991), the University of the Western Cape (2002), Yale University (2008), and Stellenbosch University (2009).

== Career ==
After finishing her studies at Cambridge, Oduyoye has held teaching positions at Princeton Theological Seminary, Harvard University, Union Theological Seminary, and the University of Ibadan. Oduyoye is currently Director of the Institute of Women in Religion and Culture at Trinity Theological Seminary, Legon.

Oduyoye began teaching at the high school level, and then taught at the College level. After a short stint teaching in a boys' school, she joined the Faculty of Religious Studies Department at the University of Ibadan in 1975. While a member of The Ecumenical Association of Third World Theologians (EATWOT), she created the Commission on Theology from Third World Women's Perspective. She also participated in a four-year study (1978–1981) titled the “Community of Women and Men in Church and Society.” This study uncovered inequalities in Church communities as well as the sexism, racism and classism in the society as a whole.

In addition to her academic posts, Oduyoye has worked for a number of ecumenical organizations. From 1970 to 1973, she worked as the All Africa Conference of Churches (AACC) Youth Secretary at the Ibadan office. She worked as the Youth Education Secretary (1967–1979) and then as Deputy General Secretary (1987–1994) for the World Council of Churches. She was the first African to take this position. In 1989, she served as president of the World Student Christian Federation and founded the Circle of Concerned African Women Theologians.

Oduyoye married Adedoyin Modupe Oduyoye in 1968, and they lived in Geneva until 1970. Her husband was a Yale graduate and the General Secretary of the Student Christian Movement (SCM), of which she was also a member. She resigned from the WCC in Geneva in 1970 and moved to Nigeria, where she took a job as Youth Secretary of the All Africa Conference of Churches (AACC) from 1970 to 1973. She left the AACC when all employees were required to live in Nairobi.

In 2011, she was the 9th Annual Patricia Reif, IHM, Memorial Lecture speaker and presented “Women and Violence in Africa: the Plight of Widows and the Churches' Response” on Monday, November 14, 2011, in the Mudd Theater at the Claremont School of Theology.

== The Circle of Concerned African Women Theologians ==
In 1989 Oduyoye, convened and launched the first meeting of the Circle of Concerned African Women Theologians at Trinity College in Accra, Ghana. An International Planning Committee helped plan the convening. Seventy-nine women gathered from across the African continent to see how they could address patriarchy, racism, and sexism rooted in both culture and religion, a theological method Oduyoye developed at Harvard. The attendees named themselves the Circle of Concerned African Women Theologians, evoking a non-hierarchical and inclusive methodology. While the first group was primarily Christian, the Circle nourishes "communality," face-to-face encounters, that encourage solidarity in the struggle with the multiple religious traditions that find expression on the African continent.

At the same time, Feminist, Murjista, Asian and Womanist Theology and other Liberation theologies were breaking into the theological discourse. Teresia Hinga, who attended this first conference of the Circle said that Oduyoye was frustrated at not seeing African women represented in global liberation theologies. Oduyoye gathered 70 to 80 women from across the African continent to see how they could address patriarchy, racism and sexism rooted in both culture and religion. The primary goal of the circle is to systematically apply a "hermeneutics of suspicion" to both religion and culture and promote publications and research that facilitates injustices, especially sexism. The attendees named themselves the Circle of Concerned African Women Theologians, evoking their non-hierarchical and inclusive methodology. While the first group was primarily Christian, the Circle seeks communality with the multiple religious traditions that find expression on the African continent. The Circle represents the "dialogical approach to religious and cultural tensions" in Africa and beyond.

== African Women's Theology ==
Oduyoye is known as the "mother of African women's theologies."

Oduyoye talks about the importance of matrilineal kinship in her Ghanaian upbringing. However, she married into the patrilineal kinship of Yoruba culture through her Nigerian husband. Oduyoye has no children.

In 1948, Oduyoye experienced the atmosphere of Ghana's independence as Ghana boycotted European goods. Her sense of Pan-Africanism increased, and she was particularly influenced by President Kwame Nkrumah's assertion that "Ghana's Independence meant nothing if the rest of Africa was not Independent." Furthermore, the ways Europe subjugated Ghana's wealth contradicted Oduyoye's experiences on her grandfather's coconut farm of an interconnected economy.

During Oduyoye's period of teaching in the United States, she realized that "people who wrote about Africa and Christianity in Africa, were not Africans" and were all men, having only the "male face in mind." She experienced the Black liberation theology movement and found her voice within liberation theology; however, liberation theology was not sensitive to feminist issues, especially for African women. She saw Western feminist theologians' emphasis on sexuality as an inaccurate reflection of the priorities of African women. In the United States, Alice Walker and Mary Daly raised awareness of genital mutilation as a primary concern for all women. Contrary to this, Oduyoye says that woman's theology from the African perspective emphasizes issues of poverty and discrimination.

A second problem that Oduyoye identified within Western feminist theology was a singularly positive depiction of missionaries and their supposed benefit to African populations. She disrupts this narrative by recognizing African culture and traditions that do not conform to Western ideals, and arguing against missionaries' attempts to erase African culture. For Oduyoye, "the Bible is not British culture or French culture or European culture." Her work around African women's theology seeks to expand upon theologies by African men. Oduyoye saw the revitalization of African theology as "...a prerequisite to other independences."

== Christianity and Indigenous cultures ==
Oduyoye holds churches accountable for their contributions to patriarchy and sexism, and argues that men and women have equal status before God. Oduyoye encourages women to recognize and claim their instrumental roles in forming churches in their communities. She advocates for the embrace of African indigenous cultures, which contain resources for thinking about gender beyond the patriarchy of Western culture.

Oduyoye implicitly offers a cultural criticism akin to postcolonial theology, which aims to use indigenous cultural thinking to challenge Western norms. In the 1981 assembly of Ecumenical Association of Third World Theologians in New Delhi, India, Oduyoye addressed what she termed as "irruption within the irruption." Oduyoye draws on hospitality and sisterhood as resources for solidarity to help people in the Global South deal with the effects of shared oppressions.

== Works ==
- "Reflections from a Third World Woman's Perspective: Women's Experience and Liberation Theologies" in Irruption in the Third World the Challenge to Theology (1983)
- Hearing and Knowing: Theological Reflections on Christianity in Africa (Eugene: Wipf and Stock Publishers, 1986) ISBN 9781606088616, OCLC 758532712
- "Women and Ritual in Africa" in The Will to Arise: Women, Tradition, and the Church in Africa (1992)
- "Feminist Theology in an African Perspective" in Paths of African Theology (1994)
- Daughters of Anowa: African Women and Patriarchy (Maryknoll, NY: Orbis Books, 1999) ISBN 9780883449998, OCLC 258564319
- Introducing African Women's Theology (Cleveland: The Pilgrim Press, 2001) ISBN 9780829814231, OCLC 611377765
- Beads and Strands: Reflections of an African Woman on Christianity in Africa (Maryknoll, NY: Orbis Books, 2004) ISBN 9781570755439, OCLC 55109167
