= Fernando Segovia =

Cuban-American theologian

- Born: 1948 (age 77–78)
- Notable work: "Love Relationships in the Johannine Tradition: Agape / Agapan in I John and the Fourth Gospel" (1982), "The Farewell of the Word: The Johannine Call to Abide" (1992), "Decolonizing Biblical Studies: A View from the Margins" (2000)
- Title: Theologian, Professor, President of the Society of Biblical Literature.
- Theological work
- Language: English, Spanish
- Tradition or movement: Liberation Theology
- Main interests: New Testament, Origins of Christianity

Fernando F. Segovia (born 1948) is a Cuban American biblical scholar, theologian, scriptural critic, and cultural critic. He is the Oberlin Graduate Professor of New Testament and Early Christianity at Vanderbilt University Divinity School. In his role as a practitioner of postcolonial biblical criticism, Segovia focuses upon the New Testament and the origins of Christianity. He is well known as a specialist in the Johannine literature and biblical hermeneutics.

== Biography ==
Segovia holds a Bachelor of Arts from the Pontifical College Josephinum (1970), and an M.A. (1976) and Ph.D. (1978) from the University of Notre Dame. He was elected a member of the Catholic Biblical Association in 1974. He was a teaching assistant and lecturer in the theology department at Notre Dame from 1973–1977 and was assistant, then associate professor of theology at Marquette University from 1977–1984. Segovia joined the faculty of Vanderbilt University's Divinity School in 1984, first as associate, then as full professor. Segovia is past president of La Comunidad of Hispanic Scholars of Religion (of which he is also a founding member), of the Academy of Catholic Hispanic Theologians of the United States (ACHTUS), and of the Society of Biblical Literature (2014). He was the 1998 recipient of the Virgilio Elizondo Award from the ACHTUS.

== Works ==
- Segovia, Fernando F., ed. (1998). What is John? Literary and Social Readings of the Fourth Gospel. Atlanta, GA: Scholars Press. ISBN 978-0-7885-0491-4.
- Segovia, Fernando F. (2000). Decolonizing Biblical Studies: A View from the Margins. Maryknoll, NY: Orbis Books. ISBN 978-1-57075-338-1.
- Segovia, Fernando F., ed. (2000). Interpreting Beyond Borders. Sheffield: Sheffield University Press. ISBN 978-1-84127-104-0.
- Lozada Jr., Francisco; Segovia, Fernando F., eds. (2014). Latino/a Biblical Hermeneutics: Problematics, Objectives, Strategies. Atlanta, GA: SBL Press. ISBN 978-1-58983-655-6.
