= Kwok Pui-lan =

Hong Kong–born feminist theologian (born 1952)

- 郭佩蘭
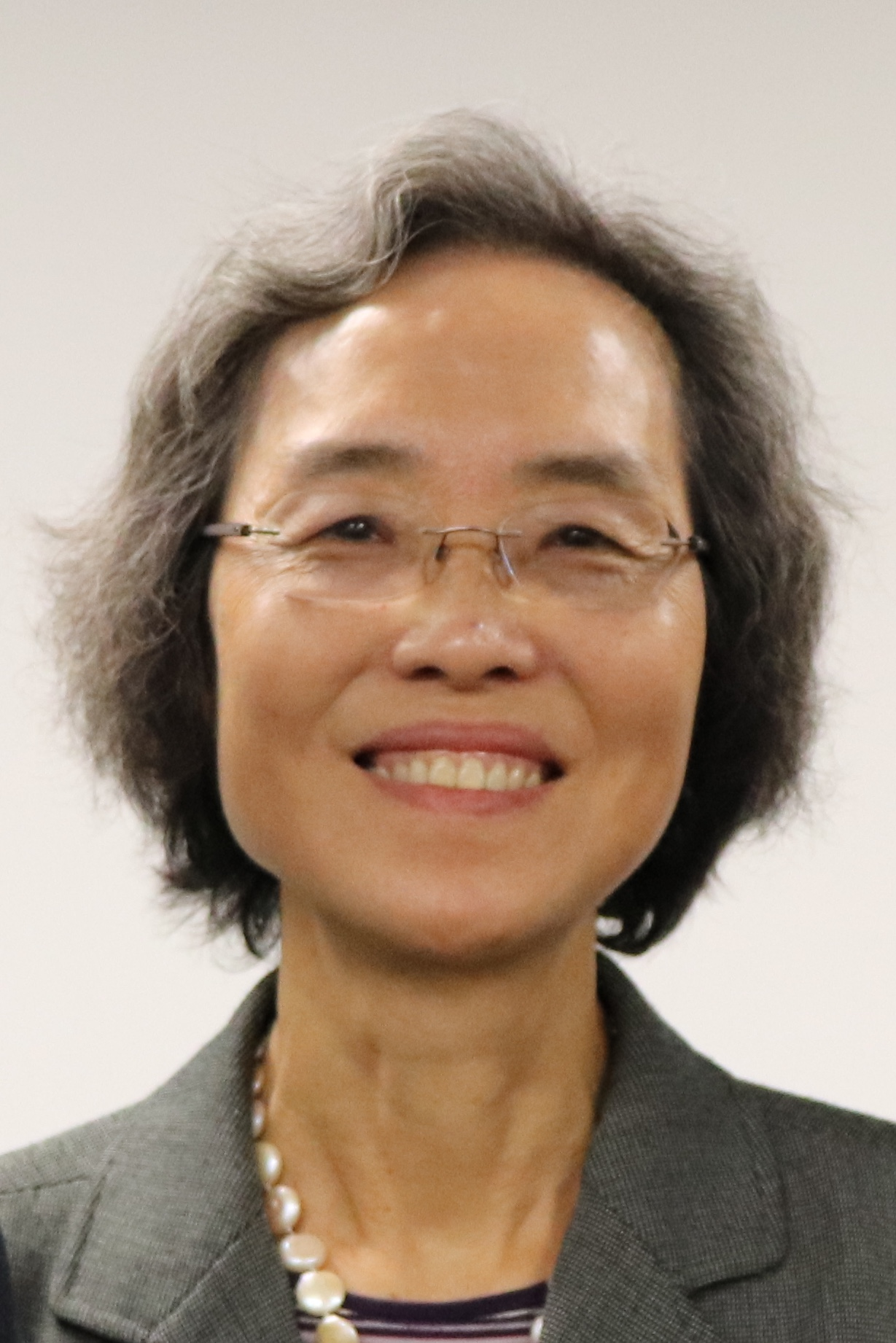
- Born: 1952 (age 73–74); Hong Kong

Academic background
- Education: Chinese University of Hong Kong; Harvard University
- Thesis: Chinese Women and Christianity, 1860–1927 (1989)

Academic work
- Discipline: Theology
- School or tradition: Anglicanism; Asian feminist theology; postcolonial theology
- Institutions: Episcopal Divinity School; Emory University
- Website: kwokpuilan.blogspot.com

Kwok Pui-lan (Chinese: 郭佩蘭, born 1952) is a Hong Kong–born feminist theologian known for her work on Asian feminist theology and postcolonial theology.

== Academic life and career ==
Kwok was born in 1952 in Hong Kong to Chinese parents who practiced Chinese folk religion at home. She converted to Anglican Christianity when she was a teenager.

Kwok started her B.A. at the Chinese University of Hong Kong, before moving on to do her BD and MTh at Southeast Asia Graduate School of Theology. She gained her Th.D. from Harvard Divinity School, finishing her doctoral dissertation on "Chinese Women and Christianity" in 1989, later published through Scholars Press. She is the author of twenty books, including Postcolonial Imagination and Feminist Theology (2005). She has published in the disciplines of feminist theology, postcolonial theology and biblical hermeneutics from her personal perspective as an Asian woman.

From 1992 to 2017, Kwok was teaching at the Episcopal Divinity School in Cambridge, Massachusetts, and was appointed the William F. Cole Professor of Christian Theology and Spirituality. She has been employed at Candler School of Theology, first as a distinguished visiting professor of theology for the 2017–2018 and 2018–2019 academic years, then from 2020 to 2024 as the Dean's Professor of Theology. She was then re-appointed to Episcopal Divinity School, to serve as a Distinguished Scholar from January 2025 to December 2026.

In 2011, Kwok was elected president of the American Academy of Religion. She writes, "as leaders, we have to bring the tribe along. Those of us who are pioneers have the responsibility of opening the door a little wider for others to come."

Kwok was a recipient of the 2021 Lambeth Awards, under the category Lanfranc Award for Education and Scholarship, "for outstanding leadership and contribution to Asian Feminist and Post-Colonial Theology rooted in an Anglican ecclesiology".

== Theology ==
Kwok argues that Asia has been transformed through warfare, religion, Western Christianity, and technology. Families and the role of women in society have been greatly shaped by "economic and political changes in the Asian countries which ultimately affect familial patterns, the status of women, reproduction and traditional gender roles."

Female labor in Asia is something that has been overlooked, as most "women are employed mostly in dead-end, low-skilled or semi-skilled manufacturing jobs, in retail or the service sector." In other words, women are considered the least within the Asian labor system. For Dr. Kwok Pui-lan, Christianity can create a new hope within the life of Asian women, but also needs to grapple with the sexism and patriarchy that is a part of the moral tapestry and organizational behavior of Western Christianity.

Writing in feminist theology, postcolonial criticism and biblical hermeneutics, Kwok has maintained as her identity as an Asian woman, incorporating it into her work. She explains:

As Asian Christian women, we have our own story, which is both Asian and Christian. We can only tell this story by developing a new hermeneutics: a hermeneutics of double suspicion and reclamation.

Kwok has engaged with postcolonial theory in her work, most prominently in Postcolonial Imagination and Feminist Theology, where she argues against the inadequacies of traditional feminist theology. She states that traditional feminist theory has not sufficiently considered the experiences of non-white women, and the effects of colonialism, neocolonialism and slavery. She writes for the need to overcome the binary concept of gender, arguing for a more fluid interpretation of gender and the inclusion of queer sexuality. She argues that "the most important contribution of postcolonial feminist theology will be to recapitulate the relation of theology and empire through the multiple lenses of gender, race, class, sexuality, religion, and so forth." The aim of her work is to create a theology that more accurately reflects the multiple levels of oppression that women in postcolonial contexts face.

Kwok views God as organic, and places the belief in the context of the growing ecological crisis in Asia. She also examines the concept of constructing a Christology using an organic model, referring to the multiple nature references Jesus uses to describe himself and his relationship with believers.

Kwok advocates for the incorporation of oral history within theology, writing "we must allow the possibility of doing theology in poems, songs, stories, dances, rituals, and even lullabies." For Kwok, the storytelling tradition within many Asian societies offers a rich resource for innovative ways of doing theology as women engage with biblical stories through drama and the sharing of life experiences.

== Bibliography ==
External videos
- Women, Mission, and World Christianity (2017)

=== Monographs ===
- Kwok Pui-lan (1992). Chinese Women and Christianity, 1860–1927. Atlanta, GA: Scholars Press. ISBN 978-1-55540-669-1.
- Kwok Pui-lan (1995). Discovering the Bible in the Non-Biblical World. Maryknoll, NY: Orbis Books. ISBN 978-1592443499.
- Kwok Pui-lan (2000). Introducing Asian Feminist Theology. Sheffield: Sheffield Academic Press. ISBN 978-1-84127-066-1.
- Kwok Pui-lan (2005). Postcolonial Imagination and Feminist Theology. Louisville, KY: Westminster John Knox Press. ISBN 978-0-664-22883-5.
- Kwok Pui-lan (2010). Hope Abundant: Third World and Indigenous Women's Theology. Maryknoll NY: Orbis Books. ISBN 978-1570758805.
- Kwok, Pui-lan (2021). Postcolonial Politics and Theology: Unraveling Empire for a Global World. Louisville, KY: Westminster John Knox Press. ISBN 9780664267490.
- Kwok, Pui-lan (2023). The Anglican Tradition from a Postcolonial Perspective. New York, NY: Seabury Books. ISBN 9781640656307.

=== Edited volumes ===
- Rieger, Joerg; Kwok Pui-lan, eds. (2012). Occupy Religion: Theology of the Multitude. Rowman & Littlefield Publishers. ISBN 978-1-442-21792-8..
- Kwok Pui-lan; Donaldson, Laura E., eds. (2015). Postcolonialism, Feminism and Religious Discourse. Routledge. ISBN 978-1-136-69761-6.
- Kwok Pui-lan, ed. (2020). Asian and Asian American Women in Theology and Religion: Embodying Knowledge. Palgrave Macmillan. ISBN 978-3-030-36818-0.
- Kwok, Pui-lan; Yip, Francis Ching-Wah, eds. (2021). The Hong Kong Protests and Political Theology. Rowman & Littlefield. ISBN 9781538148716.

=== Writings about Kwok ===
- Brock, Rita Nakashima; Liew, Tat-siong Benny, eds. (2021). Theologies of the Multitude for the Multitudes: The Legacy of Kwok Pui-lan (PDF). Claremont, CA: Claremont Press. ISBN 978-1-946230-53-9.

== See also ==
- Liberation theology
- Women in China
  - Women in Hong Kong
- Christian feminism

Professional and academic associations
Preceded by Ann Taves	President of the American Academy of Religion; 2011	Succeeded by Otto Maduro
