= Chung Hyun Kyung =

South Korean Christian theologian (born 1956)

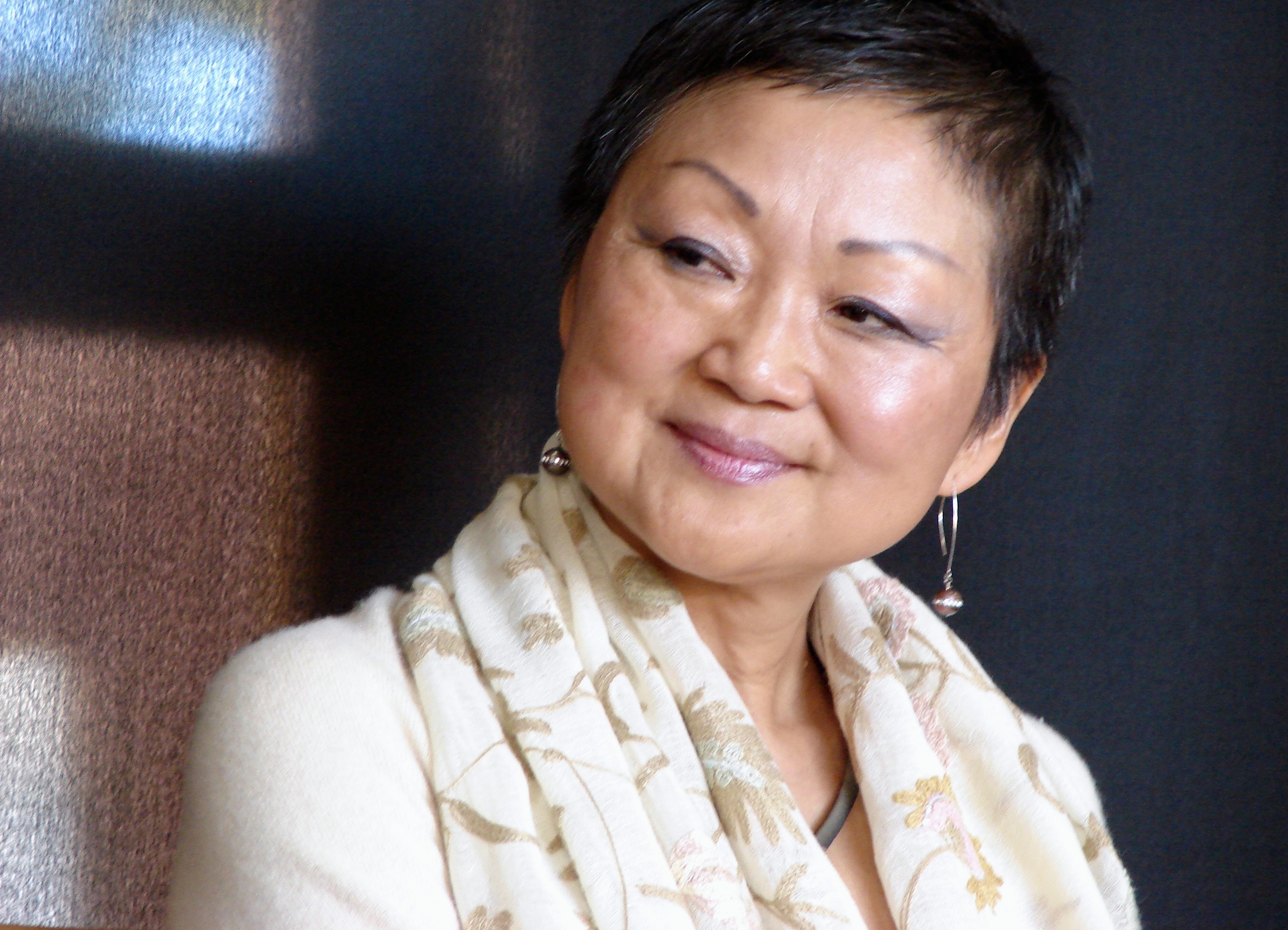
- Education: Ewha Womans University (B.A. 1979, M.A. 1981); Claremont School of Theology (M.Div. 1984); Union Theological Seminary in the City of New York (Ph.D. 1989)
- Occupation: Theologian

Korean name
- Hangul: 정현경
- RR: Jeong Hyeongyeong
- MR: Chŏng Hyŏn'gyŏng

Chung Hyun Kyung (born May 15, 1956) is a South Korean Christian theologian. She is a lay theologian of the Presbyterian Church of Korea, and is also an Associate Professor of Ecumenical Theology at Union Theological Seminary in the United States.

Her teaching and research interests include feminist and ecofeminist theologies and spiritualities from Asia, Africa and Latin America; Christian–Buddhist interfaith dialogue; disease and healing in varied religious backgrounds; mysticism and revolutionary social change; as well as the history and critical issues of various Asian Christian theologies.

== Early life and education ==
Chung Hyun Kyung was born in Gwangju, South Korea, May 15, 1956. Chung graduated from Ewha Womans University in Seoul with a B.A. (1979) and an M.A. (1981). She holds an M.Div. from the Claremont School of Theology (1984), a diploma from the Women's Theological Center in Boston (1984), and a Ph.D. from Union Theological Seminary (1989).

== Struggle to Be the Sun Again ==
In 1990, Chung introduced Asian women's theology with her book Struggle to Be the Sun Again: Introducing Asian Women's Theology. In it, she responds to the emerging liberation theology which argues for Christianity's preferential option for the poor. She interprets the Gospel through her experience as an Asian woman:

"Doing theology is a personal and a political activity. As a Korean woman, I do theology in search of what it means to be fully human in my struggle for wholeness and in my people's concrete historical fight for freedom." (1990: 1)

== WCC at Canberra ==
In 1991, she was invited to speak at a World Council of Churches gathering in Canberra, Australia. Her speech created a furor and she was accused of syncretism, that is, combining Christian teachings and practices with elements of other traditions. Her retort, however, was:

If they ask me, "Are you a syncretist?" I say, "You are right, I am a syncretist, but so are you." My response is that I know I am a syncretist, but you don't know you are a syncretist because you have hegemonic power ... non-Christian cultures, when they try to interpret the gospel out of their life experience, they are syncretists! But they are just being true to their identity, history and culture.

In the same interview, she challenged the Western values imposed on the Third World:

"I think in order to really heal the world we need the 'wisdom of darkness.' This can be the Third World, dark people, women, or our 'shadows,' ... all the things we do not want to confront within ourselves, so we project them onto others and call them terrorists. So, I think that we need 'endarkenment' for a while, not enlightenment, to heal the world."

== Works ==
- Chung, Hyun Kyung (1990-01-01). Struggle to be the Sun Again: Introducing Asian Women's Theology. Orbis Books. ISBN 9780883446843.

== See also ==
- Asian feminist theology
