= Wonhee Anne Joh =

South Korean author

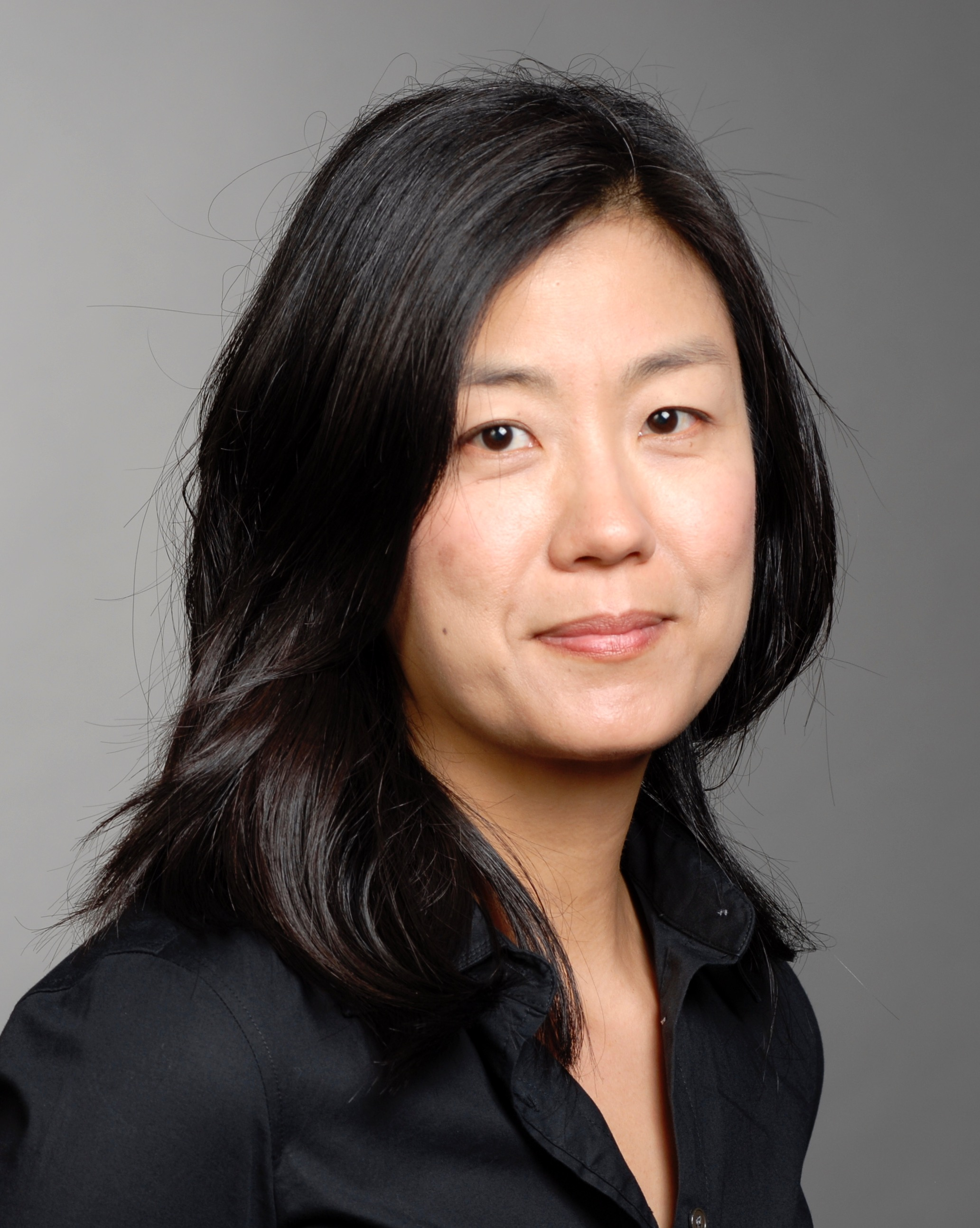
- Born: South Korea
- Education: North Central College (BA); Princeton Theological Seminary (M.Div.); Drew University (PhD)
- Occupations: Author, professor, lecturer

Wonhee Anne Joh is an author, theologian, professor, and lecturer with a focus on the disciplines of religion, women's equality, and Asian American Studies.

== Career ==
Joh is a Professor of Theology and Culture at Garrett-Evangelical Theological Seminary in Evanston, Illinois. Joh serves as an affiliate faculty in the Department of Religious Studies and the Asian American Studies Program, and she is a faculty member in the Religion and Global Politics Group (Buffett Institute) at Northwestern University in Evanston, Illinois. Describing her teaching philosophy, Joh stated, "As a teacher, I believe that transformative praxis begins with each of us in our everyday lives. Theological reflection is crucial because the meaning of our lives is often understood through the prism of religious experience. Therefore, theological reflection must be bold and imaginative as well as grounded in the material reality of the history of peoples' lives."

== Heart of the Cross: A Postcolonial Christology ==
Joh's 2006 book, Heart of the Cross: A Postcolonial Christology, utilizes the Korean concept of jeong to construct "a theology that is feminist, political and love-centred, while acknowledging the cross as a source of pain and suffering." Heart of The Cross uses postcolonial theory as well as post-structuralism, psychoanalysis, and liberationist feminist hermeneutics. The book investigates Christology by drawing on Joh's Korean American experience.

== Works ==
- Heart of the Cross: A Postcolonial Christology. Louisville: Westminster John Knox Press, 2006
- Terror, Trauma and Mourning: A Postcolonial Theology of Hope. Under contract and forthcoming with Fordham University Press.
- Engaging the United States as a Military Empire: Critical Studies of Christianity from Asian/Asian North American Perspectives. Ed. Anne Joh and Nami Kim. New York, NY: Palgrave, 2016.
- Korean Christian LGBT: A Critical Approach. Ed. Anne Joh and Nami Kim. Forthcoming.
