= Postcolonial theology =

Christian school of thought

Postcolonial theology is the application of postcolonial criticism to Christian theology. As in postcolonial discourse, the term postcolonial is often used without a hyphen, denoting an intellectual reaction against the colonial.

== Background ==
Postcolonial theologians argue that, in the past, the dominant Western form of Christianity is actually determined, shaped, and defined by European colonialism, implying and reinforcing notions such as Eurocentrism, colonial exploitation, and the superiority of European values and culture. Therefore, critical examination is needed, and alternative interpretations to colonially-tainted narratives need to be constructed. This is done by "revisiting the question of how indigenous cultures can contribute to theology and biblical studies".

Although decolonization took place shortly after the Second World War, postcolonial theories did not emerge until the late 1970s. The field of postcolonial theology, correspondingly, did not arise until the 1990s.

Notable biblical scholars include R. S. Sugirtharajah and Fernando Segovia and theologians include Musa W. Dube, Wai-Ching Angela Wong, Kwok Pui-lan, and Mayra Rivera.

== Biblical criticism ==
Given its similarities with literary analysis, it is not surprising that biblical studies was the first field within Christian studies to apply postcolonial criticism. Adopting postcolonial critical methods, biblical studies is inspired to take into account issues of "expansion, domination, and imperialism" in examining existing biblical interpretation, and in constructing new narratives. Indigenous non-Western approaches to theologizing the Bible, previously neglected under the colonial context "in favor of European methods", are now revisited, in hope to "make the Bible comprehensible to the colonized cultures on their own terms". Therefore, traditional fields of translation, exegesis, and hermeneutics in biblical studies have to be reconsidered in light of postcolonial criticism, and non-Western perspectives have to be taken into account, even as focal points.

Among various scholars, R. S. Sugirtharajah, one of the principal advocates of postcolonial biblical studies, outlined in his book The Bible and the Third World three hermeneutic approaches which emerged after colonialism: the native or vernacular approach, the liberation approach, and the postcolonial approach.

There are certain benefits of applying postcolonial criticism to biblical studies. First, it opens up potential areas and possibilities for interdisciplinary work, enriching the discipline by enabling multiple approaches to bring in their insights. Second, it allows for criticism towards the way things are done, including the principles and presuppositions of the field. In addition, it also avoids detachment from the contemporary world, as work done in the discipline would have to respond to postcolonial contexts.

== Christian mission historiography ==
Reviewing Christian history from a postcolonial critical perspective, history is realized to be intrinsically more than just impartial facts. As history is essentially a narrative of what happened, it is always an interpretation, which is "bound by time, place, and the social, political, religious, cultural and economic positions of writers", and a representation, being an "interested construction of representation through which power is expressed, reflected, and exercised."

Postcolonial historical methods, therefore, begins with tracing the development of the dominant narrative, followed by a critical reassessment of the sources and the historiography of the mainstream narrative, and finally teasing out the colonial taints and construct new, alternative narratives. This is especially relevant in the history of churches in which missionary work has been heavily involved, as such historiographies tend to have more difficulty in treating Western engagement and local churches from an egalitarian perspective.

As such, postcolonial criticism contributes to the discipline by putting forth a recognition that current narratives are, or at least are likely to be, shaped by the colonial context. This leads to the awareness that there could be, and should be, alternative representations of those parts of history. Biased historical readings are therefore prevented or at least reduced.

== Christian theology ==
Given the short history of engaging with postcolonial criticism, postcolonial theology as a field of study is still "in its infancy." It is argued by R. S. Sugirtharajah that its development is further held back by Western reluctance to analyse the theological implications of colonial imperialism.

However, theologians from the colonized non-West such as C. S. Song and Chung Hyun Kyung have long been theologizing with reflection or even resistance against the colonizing West. Interpreted from the perspective of postcolonial criticism, these theologies could be retrospectively categorized as postcolonial theology. Geographically, they could also be conceptualized according to the three main continents, Africa, Asia, and Latin America. Regional theologies are also influenced by other intellectual trends, such as liberation theology or feminist theology.

=== African theology ===
In Africa, theology is often articulated in one of two aspects: inculturation and liberation. The former is often described as African theology, which is a term first appeared in 1965 at the All Africa Conference of Churches, and could be identified as "an attempt by Africans to give theological articulation to their spiritual, political, and economic struggles." The latter is a form of liberation theology and also has an interesting relationship with black theology in North America. This would later influence South African theology, especially during and after apartheid.

=== Asian theology ===
Asian theology could be understood to be inherently postcolonial, as it has moved towards a "discontinuity with Western theology and denounced the usefulness of a theology that allied itself with colonial powers and their dominance." This resonates with the strong currents of nationalism. However, since Asian churches have historically been considered under colonial authorities, theologians have had to wrestle with the tension (or even conflict) between religious and national identity. In addition, its focal points include indigenization, liberation from poverty, as well as practical commitment in engaging with the praxis of reality. Hence, the influence of liberation theology is easily notable.

Asian local theologies include Dalit theology in South Asia, Minjung theology in South Korea, and Burakumin theology in Japan.

=== Latin American theology ===
The Latin American church has been famous for their liberation theology, which influenced numerous theological trends worldwide. It is arguably the earliest postcolonial resistance to western dominance. In comparison, it seems more politically minded, and less concerned in formulating an inculturated theology. Inspired in the 1950s within the Roman Catholic Church, it critiques the colonial situation in three ways, addressing how oppression was structurally enforced by the authorities, complicit by the church, and internalized by the oppressed themselves.

== See also ==
- Asian feminist theology
- Contextual theology
