= Brethren (religious group) =

Brethren is a name adopted by a wide range of mainly Christian religious groups throughout history. The largest movement is Anabaptist.

== Groups from the Middle Ages ==
- Apostolic Brethren (13th century), mendicant order similar to the Franciscans
- Kalands Brethren (13th century), German charitable organization
- Brethren of the Free Spirit (13th century), mystical reform movement
- The Brethren of the Common Life (14th century), intentional communities dedicated to service

== Anabaptist groups ==
These groups grew out of the Anabaptist movement at the time of the Protestant Reformation (16th century).

- The Hutterites, also known as Hutterian Brethren, originated from German, Swiss, and Tyrolean Anabaptists led by Jacob Hutter in the 1520s
- The Swiss Brethren, the name Swiss Anabaptists used from 1525 until their split into Amish and Mennonite groups in 1693
- The Mennonite Brethren, originated among Russian Mennonites in 1860

=== Schwarzenau Brethren ===
The Schwarzenau Brethren originated in 1708 in Schwarzenau, Bad Berleburg, Germany, with Alexander Mack. Their roots are in the Radical Pietism movement but they were strongly influenced by Anabaptist theology. They have also been called "Dunkers" or "German Baptist Brethren". The group split into three wings in 1881–1883:

==== Traditionalists ====
- Old German Baptist Brethren, part of the Old Order Movement
  - Old Brethren, a denomination that split from the Old German Baptist Brethren in 1913 and 1915
    - Old Brethren German Baptist, also known as Leedyites, the most conservative denomination of Schwarzenau Brethren. They live in Indiana and Missouri
  - Old Order German Baptist Brethren, a small very conservative denomination
  - Old German Baptist Brethren, New Conference, formed in 2009 as a result of a split among the Old German Baptist Brethren

==== Conservatives ====
- Church of the Brethren, based in Elgin, Illinois
  - Dunkard Brethren, a small conservative denomination that withdrew from the Church of the Brethren in 1926

==== Progressives ====
- The Brethren Church, based in Ashland, Ohio
  - Fellowship of Grace Brethren Churches, former name of Charis Fellowship, a theologically conservative denomination that split from the Brethren Church in 1939
  - Conservative Grace Brethren Churches, International, a conservative denomination that separated from the Fellowship of Grace Brethren Churches

=== River Brethren ===
The River Brethren have their origins in the ministries of Mennonite Bishop Jacob Engle and Mennonite Pastor Martin Boehm, beginning in Lancaster County, Pennsylvania in the latter half of the 18th century. They were also influenced by the Schwarzenau Brethren and include (amongst others):

- Brethren in Christ Church, an Anabaptist Christian denomination with roots in the Mennonite church, pietism, and Wesleyan holiness. They have also been known as River Brethren and River Mennonites
- Church of the United Brethren in Christ, an evangelical denomination based in Huntington, Indiana.
- Old Order River Brethren
- United Zion Church

== Moravian Brethren ==
- Moravian Church, also known as United Brethren, Unitas Fratrum, and Bohemian Brethren, descend from the followers of Jan Hus, a Czech reformer burned at the stake in 1415 and Bohemian 15th-century nobleman and theologian Petr Chelčický
- Unity of the Brethren, a conservative Moravian denomination that also traces its roots to the work of Hus and Chelčický

== Plymouth Brethren ==
The Plymouth Brethren originated in the 1820s work of John Nelson Darby and others in Ireland, the United Kingdom, and India. Plymouth Brethren divided into two branches in 1848:

- Exclusive Brethren
  - Plymouth Brethren Christian Church, also known as Raven-Taylor-Hales Brethren
  - Local churches (affiliation), also known as Church Assembly Hall
- Open Brethren
  - Gospel Hall Brethren, also known as Gospel Hall Assemblies
  - Needed Truth Brethren, also known as Churches of God
  - Indian Brethren, an Evangelical premillennial religious movement
  - Kerala Brethren, Assembly, also known as Verbada Sabha

== Albright Brethren ==
- Evangelical Church (ECNA)
- Evangelical Congregational Church

== United Brethren ==
- Church of the United Brethren in Christ, which traces its roots to the 1800s work of Martin Boehm and Philip William Otterbein
- Evangelical Church (ECNA), also traces its roots to the work of Martin Boehm and Philip William Otterbein

=== Former United Brethren ===
They merged with a large group of Methodists to become the United Methodist Church in 1968:

- Church of the United Brethren in Christ (New Constitution)
- Evangelical United Brethren

== Other religious groups ==
- Apostolic United Brethren, a Mormon fundamentalist group
- The Brethren (Jim Roberts group), an apocalyptic Jesus people movement from the 1970s
- Brethren of Purity, a secret society of Muslim philosophers in the 8th or 10th century CE
- The Church of the Lutheran Brethren of America is a Pietistic Lutheran denomination that emerged during 19th-century spiritual awakening among Lutheran congregations in the upper Midwestern United States. They formed a separate synod in 1900.
- Evangelical Church of Czech Brethren, a Czech Lutheran–Reformed Protestant church
- The Polish Brethren, also known as Socinians, were an Anti-trinitarian group, forerunners for the Unitarians
- The Social Brethren originated in Saline County, Illinois in 1867, the result of an attempt to put the slavery issue away in favor of uniting on a common belief in the death, burial, and resurrection of Jesus Christ
- Studite Brethren, a society in the Ukrainian Greek Catholic Church
- United Brethren, a group of Methodists who later joined the Church of Jesus Christ of Latter-day Saints
- The United Seventh-Day Brethren, an Adventist body
- "The Brethren", a collective name for the general authorities of the Church of Jesus Christ of Latter-day Saints
- Wesleyan Brethren, a Methodist denomination aligned with the conservative holiness movement
