= Methodist Episcopal Church =

Religious organization in the United States

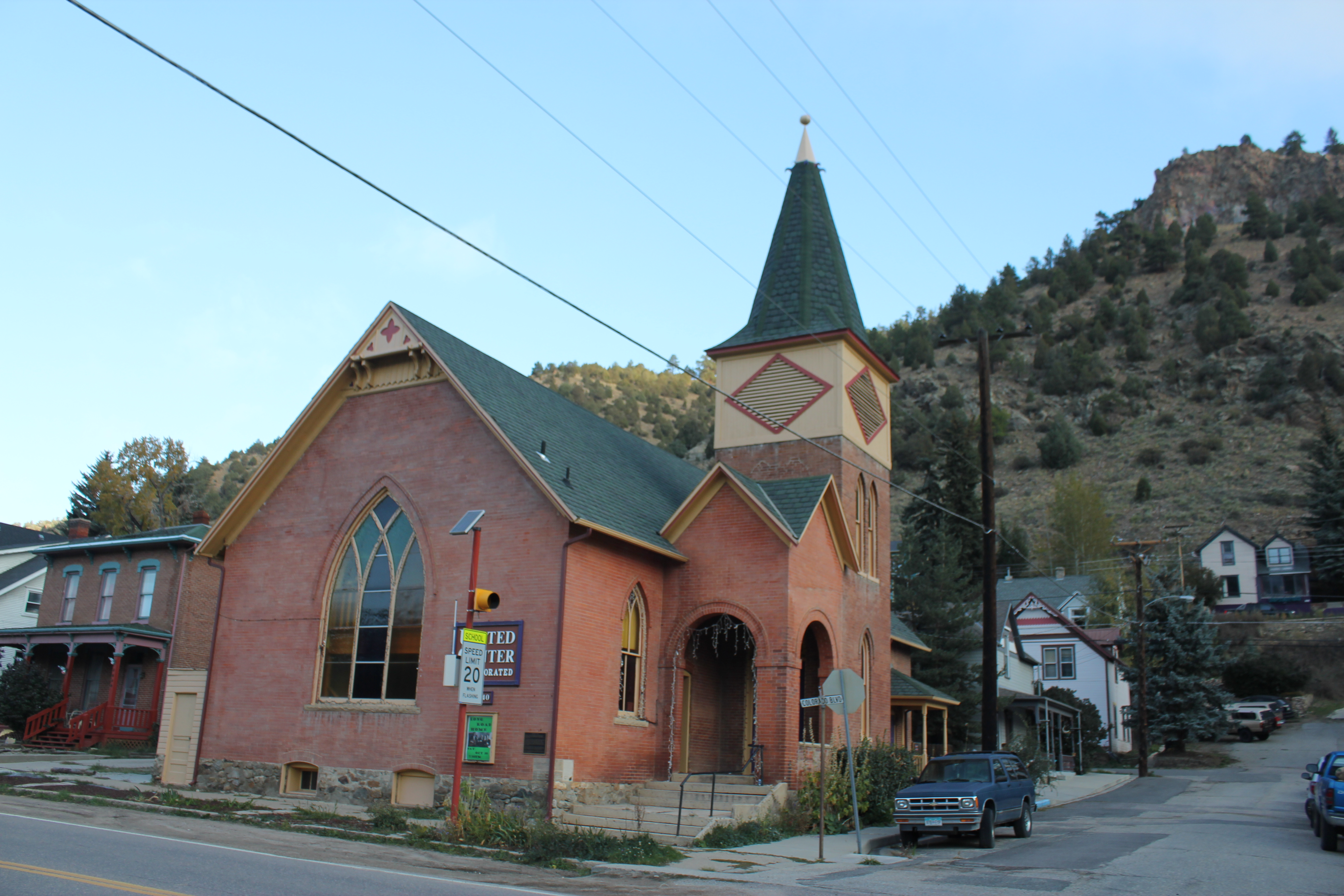
- Classification: Protestant
- Orientation: Methodism
- Polity: Connectionalism (modified episcopal polity)
- Founder: John Wesley
- Origin: December 1784; Baltimore, Maryland, United States
- Separated from: Church of England
- Separations: Republican Methodist Church (1792); African Methodist Episcopal Church (1816); African Methodist Episcopal Zion Church (1821); Methodist Episcopal Church of Canada (1828); Methodist Protestant Church (1828); Wesleyan Methodist Church (1841); Free Methodist Church (1860); Christian Union (1864); Church of God (Holiness) (1883); Christ's Sanctified Holy Church (1892); Pilgrim Holiness Church (1897); Lumber River Conference of the Holiness Methodist Church (1900); Evangelical Methodist Church in the Philippine Islands (1909); Kentucky Mountain Holiness Association (1925)
- Merged into: The Methodist Church (1939)
- Congregations: 24,295 in 1937
- Members: 4.4 million in 1937
- Ministers: 15,741 in 1935

The Methodist Episcopal Church (MEC) was the oldest and largest Methodist denomination in the United States from its founding in 1784 until 1939. It was also the first religious denomination in the US to organize itself nationally. In 1939, the MEC reunited with two breakaway Methodist denominations (the Methodist Protestant Church and the Methodist Episcopal Church, South) to form the Methodist Church. In 1968, the Methodist Church merged with the Evangelical United Brethren Church to form the United Methodist Church.

The MEC's origins lie in the First Great Awakening when Methodism emerged as an evangelical revival movement within the Church of England that stressed prevenient grace, spiritual experience and accountable discipleship, ethical living, and the possibility of attaining Christian perfection. By the 1760s, Methodism had spread to the Thirteen Colonies, and Methodist societies were formed under the oversight of John Wesley. As in England, American Methodists remained affiliated with the Church of England, but this state of affairs became untenable after the American Revolution. In response, Wesley ordained the first Methodist elders for America in 1784. Under the leadership of its first bishops, Thomas Coke and Francis Asbury, the Methodist Episcopal Church adopted episcopal polity and an itinerant model of ministry that saw circuit riders provide for the religious needs of a widespread and mobile population.

Early Methodism was countercultural in that it was anti-elitist and anti-slavery, appealing especially to African Americans and women. While critics derided Methodists as fanatics, the Methodist Episcopal Church continued to grow, especially during the Second Great Awakening in which Methodist revivalism and camp meetings left its imprint on American culture. In the early 19th century, the MEC became the largest and most influential religious denomination in the United States. With growth came greater institutionalization and respectability, and this led some within the church to complain that Methodism was losing its vitality and commitment to Wesleyan teachings, such as the belief in Christian perfection and opposition to slavery.

As Methodism took hold in the Southern United States, church leaders became less willing to condemn the practice of slavery or to grant African American preachers and congregations the same privileges as their European American counterparts. A number of black churches were formed as African Americans withdrew from the MEC, including the African Methodist Episcopal Church and the African Methodist Episcopal Zion Church. By the 1830s, however, a renewed abolitionist movement within the MEC made keeping a neutral position on slavery impossible. Ultimately, the church divided along regional lines in 1845 when pro-slavery Methodists in the South formed their own Methodist Episcopal Church, South. Around the same time, the holiness movement took shape as a renewal movement within the MEC focused on the experience of Christian perfection, but it eventually led a number of splinter groups to break away from the church, most notably the Free Methodist Church and Wesleyan Methodist Church. Due to large-scale immigration of Catholics, the Catholic Church displaced the MEC as the largest US denomination by the end of the 19th century.

== History ==
=== Background (1766–1783) ===
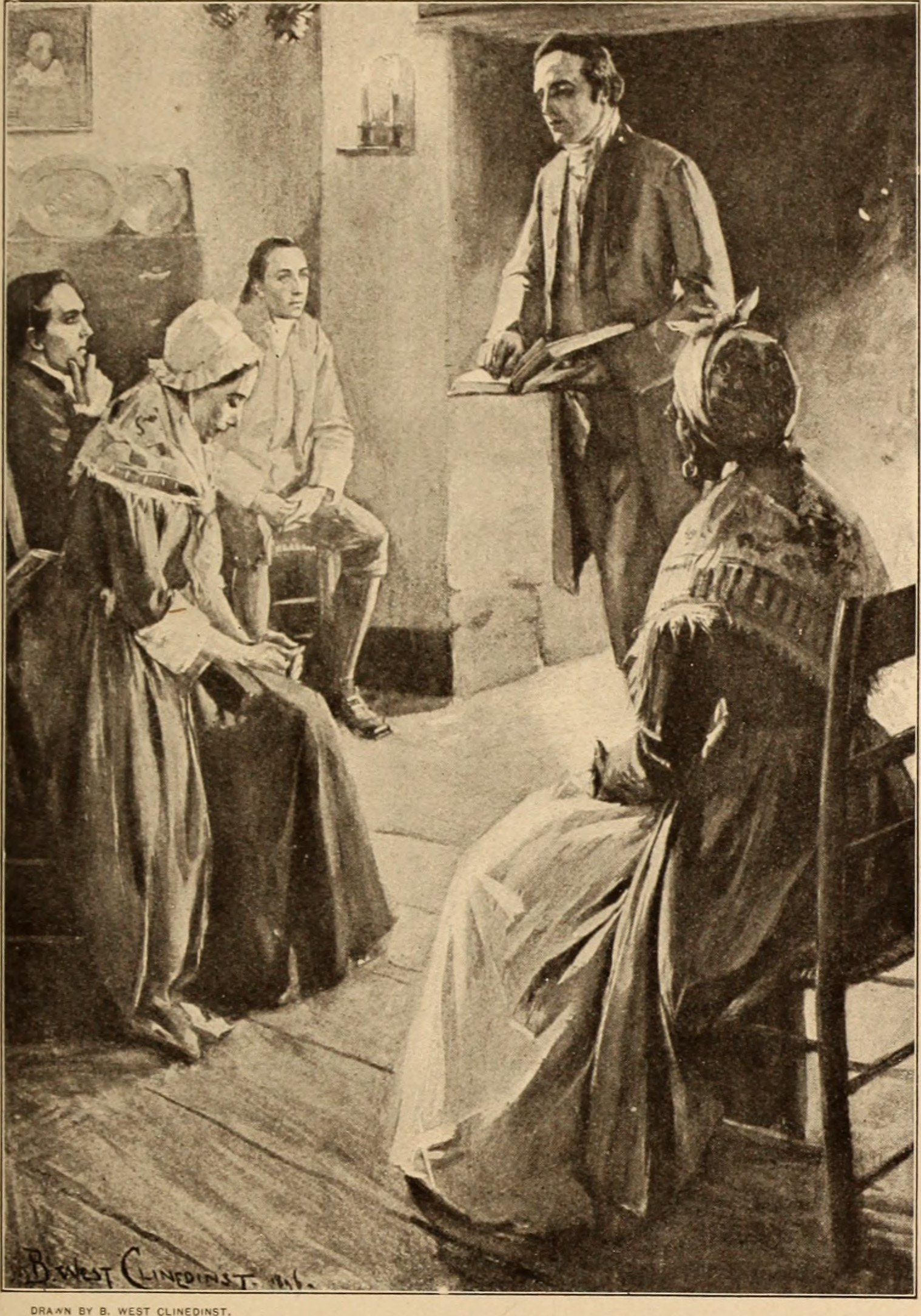
Philip Embury preaching during the first Methodist meeting in New York City

The Methodist Episcopal Church originated from the spread of Methodism outside of England to the Thirteen Colonies in the 1760s. Earlier, Methodism had grown out of the ministry of John Wesley, a priest in the Church of England who preached an evangelical message centered on justification by faith, repentance, the possibility of having assurance of salvation, and the doctrine of Christian perfection.

Wesley was loyal to the Anglican Church, and he organized his followers into parachurch societies and classes with the goal of promoting spiritual revival within the Church of England. Members of Methodist societies were expected to attend and receive Holy Communion in their local parish church, but Wesley also recruited and supervised lay preachers for itinerant or traveling ministry.

Around fifteen or twenty societies formed a circuit. Anywhere from two to four itinerant preachers would be assigned to a circuit on a yearly basis to preach and supervise the societies within their circuit. One itinerant preacher in each circuit would be made the "assistant" (because he was an assistant to Wesley), and he would direct the activities of the other itinerant preachers in the circuit, who were called "helpers". Wesley gave out preaching assignments at an annual conference.

In 1769, Wesley sent itinerants Robert Williams, Richard Boardman, and Joseph Pilmore to oversee Methodists in America after learning that societies had already been organized there as early as 1766 by Philip Embury, Robert Strawbridge, and Thomas Webb. In 1773, Wesley appointed Thomas Rankin general assistant, placing him in charge of all the Methodist preachers and societies in America. On July 4, 1773, Rankin presided over the first annual conference on American soil at Philadelphia. At that time there were 1,160 Methodists in America led by ten lay preachers. Itinerant Methodist preachers would become known as circuit riders.

Methodist societies in America also operated within the Church of England. There were several Anglican priests who supported the work of the Methodists, attending Methodist meetings and administering the sacraments to Methodists. These included Charles Pettigrew of North Carolina, Samuel Magaw of Dover and then Philadelphia, and Uzel Ogden of New Jersey. Anglican clergyman Devereux Jarratt (1733–1801) was a particularly active supporter, founding Methodist societies in Virginia and North Carolina.

=== Establishment (1784) ===
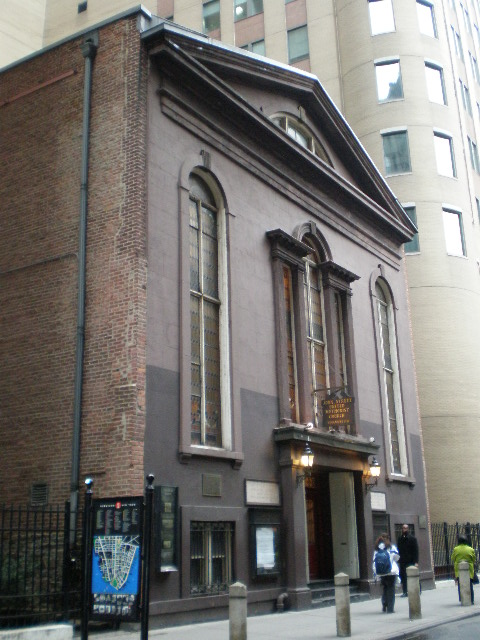
Founded in 1766, John Street Methodist Church in New York City is the oldest Methodist congregation in North America. The third and current church on this site was built in 1841.

The American Revolution severed ties to England and left America's Anglican Church in disarray. Due to the scarcity of Anglican ministers, Methodists in the United States were unable to receive the sacraments of baptism and Holy Communion. On September 1, 1784, Wesley responded to this situation by personally ordaining two Methodists as elders for America, with the right to administer the sacraments, and also ordained Thomas Coke (who was already an Anglican priest) as a superintendent with authority to ordain other Methodist clergy.

Because Wesley was not a bishop, his ordination of Coke and the others was not recognized by the Church of England, and, consequently, this marked American Methodism's separation from the Anglican Church. Wesley's actions were based in his belief that the order of bishop and priest were one and the same, so that both possess the power to ordain others.

The founding conference of the Methodist Episcopal Church, known commonly as the Christmas Conference, was held in December 1784 at Lovely Lane Chapel in Baltimore, Maryland. At this conference, Coke ordained Francis Asbury as co-superintendent according to Wesley's wishes. Asbury had been serving as general assistant since Rankin returned to England. The German-born Philip W. Otterbein, who later helped found the Church of the United Brethren in Christ, participated in Asbury's ordination.

The conference adopted Articles of Religion prepared by Wesley (and adapted from the Church of England's Thirty-nine Articles) as a doctrinal statement for the new church, and it also received an abridged version of the Church of England's Book of Common Prayer provided by Wesley, titled The Sunday Service of the Methodists; With Other Occasional Services. American Methodists, however, preferred non-liturgical worship and The Sunday Service was largely ignored.

The conference adopted an organization consisting of superintendents, elders, deacons, traveling preachers, and local preachers. Preachers were licensed to preach but were not ordained and could not administer sacraments. Traveling preachers worked full-time in itinerant ministry and were supported financially by the societies they served. Local preachers pursued secular employment but preached on Sundays in their local communities. Deacons were preachers authorized by a superintendent to officiate weddings, bury the dead, baptize, and assist the elders in administering the Lord's Supper. Only ordained elders could administer the Lord's Supper, and they were also placed in charge of circuits. In the year of its founding, the church claimed 14,986 members and 83 preachers.

==== Early characteristics ====
Year	Membership
1784	14,986
1785	18,000
1786	20,681
1787	25,842
1788	37,354
1789	43,262
1790	57,631
1791	63,269
1792	65,980
1793	67,643
1794	66,608
1795	60,291
1796	56,664
1797	58,663
1798	60,169
1799	61,351
1808	151,995
1809	163,038
1810	174,560
1811	184,567
1812	195,357
1813	214,307
1814	211,129
1925	4,516,806
1929	4,589,664
1931	4,135,775
1933	4,140,152
1935	4,345,108
1937	4,364,342

Early Methodists were drawn from the ranks of slaves, poor whites, and "middling people"—artisans, shopkeepers, petty merchants and small planters. These social classes were attracted to Methodism's condemnation of the worldliness of the gentry. Slaves and free blacks were especially attracted to the Methodist Episcopal Church's condemnation of slavery. Prominent Methodists such as Coke, Asbury, and Freeborn Garrettson preached an antislavery message, and the Christmas Conference mandated that all Methodist laity and preachers emancipate their slaves. While African Americans were not yet ordained and classes were segregated by race, important African American leaders did emerge, such as Harry Hosier who was an associate of Asbury and Coke.

Because of Methodism's conscious repudiation of upper class values and lifestyles, elite women who converted took on a revolutionary character. While women were not granted formal leadership roles (though some were class leaders occasionally), they played important roles in evangelization through class relations, family networks, correspondence, and in the home. It was common for both women and slaves to publicly deliver exhortations—testimonials and personal conversion narratives distinguishable from sermons because exhorters did not "take a text" from the Bible.

Meetings and services were often characterized by extremely emotional and demonstrative styles of worship. As part of the conversion experience, people often trembled, groaned, screamed, or fell motionless to the ground as if dead. These bodily experiences as well as Methodist ascetic practices and claims of receiving direct communication from the Holy Spirit inspired its opponents to accuse Methodism of being a form of religious enthusiasm that caused insanity. Because of its Arminian doctrines, the evangelistic work of the Methodist Episcopal Church was often opposed by Calvinists.

=== Growth, the first General Conference, and the O'Kelly Schism (1785–1792) ===
Coke had returned to Britain in 1785 but arrived back in the United States in 1787 with written instructions from Wesley. Wesley ordered the holding of a conference and that Richard Whatcoat be appointed a superintendent. At the conference, James O'Kelly and Jesse Lee led opposition to Coke and to Wesley's authority. Many preachers were offended that Coke and Wesley seemed to be taking decision making out of the hands of the American church. They also feared that Whatcoat's appointment would lead to the recall of Asbury, and this led the conference to reject Whatcoat's appointment (Whatcoat would successfully be elected in 1800). In 1788, the title of superintendent was changed to bishop.

Coke's reputation among American Methodists further suffered when his secret negotiations for a union with the Episcopal Church (as American Anglicans now styled themselves) were discovered. Coke had written and met with William White, the Episcopal Church's presiding bishop, discussing the possible lowering of Episcopal ministerial standards, the reordination of Methodist preachers, and the reconsecration of Coke and Asbury as Episcopal bishops. When Asbury learned of the negotiations, he blocked the merger plan from being considered.

Despite controversies over authority, the Methodist Episcopal Church continued to enjoy growth. By 1788, there were 37,354 members, of which 6,545 were African American. The number of circuits had grown to 85 and the number of annual conferences had grown to six. A year later, the number of annual conferences had increased to eleven. The church's reach also began to significantly expand beyond the Appalachian and Allegheny Mountain ranges. In 1791, a circuit was established in Upper Canada by William Losee. It was during this time that the first Methodist college in America was established, the short-lived Cokesbury College in Maryland.

This growth revealed problems with the church's decision-making process. Each annual conference had to agree on legislation before it was enacted, but this became unwieldy when the number of conferences grew to eleven. The need for a centralized policy-making body led to the creation of a council of bishops and presiding elders (who supervised multi-circuit districts) in 1789, but this body was soon abolished after meeting only twice.

After the failure of the council, a General Conference was held in November 1792 at Baltimore. This first General Conference gave itself legislative power over the church, determined to meet every four years, and decided membership for general and annual conferences would include all elders, deacons, and traveling preachers. Local preachers and other lay members were denied voting rights.

At the General Conference, a dispute emerged over the power of bishops to assign preachers to circuits. O'Kelly and his supporters wanted the right to appeal assignments to the conference, but this proposal was defeated. In response, they left to form the Republican Methodist Church, initiating the first schism in American Methodism. As reflected in the use of the term republican in their name, Republican Methodists desired a more egalitarian church and objected to the centralized governance and episcopal polity of the Methodist Episcopal Church. The Methodist Episcopal Church lost one-fifth of its members and would not begin to experience growth again until 1800. In 1801, the Republican Methodists rejected the Methodist label and later merged with other groups to become the Christian Connection. This group was a predecessor body to the United Church of Christ.

=== Organizational development, camp meetings and African-American Methodists (1793–1816) ===
==== Development of a constitution ====
The second General Conference was held at Baltimore in October 1796. It reduced the number of annual conferences to six and, for the first time, gave them geographical boundaries. With the drawing of definite borders, it would become understood that preachers belonged to a specific annual conference. The General Conference also required that local church property be held in trust for the Methodist Episcopal Church. Local preachers were made eligible for ordination as deacons after four years of service.

Another bishop was found necessary to aid Asbury due to Coke's frequent trips to Britain; Coke was regarded as a leading figure in Britain's Wesleyan Methodist Church, which itself split from the Anglican Church after Wesley's death in 1791. At the third General Conference held in May 1800, Richard Whatcoat was finally elected and consecrated the third bishop of the Methodist Episcopal Church.

Since the annual conferences were given geographical boundaries in 1796, they increasingly acted like states, demanding proportional representation in General Conference. Because General Conference met frequently in Baltimore, it was often dominated by the conferences closest to that city, the Philadelphia and Baltimore conferences. At the 1804 General Conference, these two conferences together had 70 preachers present, while the other five conferences combined had only 42 preachers present.

To solve this problem, delegated representation for General Conference was introduced in 1808. Each annual conference was entitled to send one representative for every five conference members. The Restrictive Regulations were also adopted at this time. These rules, which were regarded as the church's constitution, prohibited the General Conference from modifying the church's doctrinal standards and episcopal government unless such amendments were approved all the annual conferences. William McKendree was elected the fourth bishop of the Methodist Episcopal Church and the first American-born bishop to replace the deceased Whatcoat.

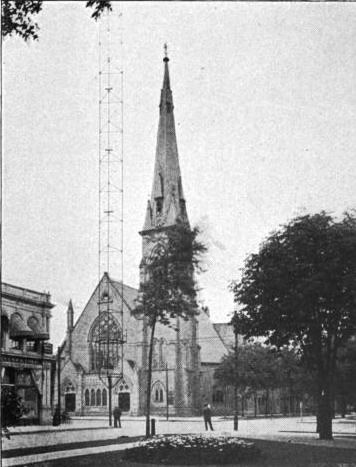
Established in 1810, Central United Methodist Church in Detroit is the oldest Protestant church in Michigan. The current building was constructed in 1866.

The 1812 General Conference was the first to convene under the new rules adopted in 1808. This conference, meeting in New York City, made local deacons eligible for ordination as elders. The Ohio and Tennessee Conferences were created to replace the Western Conference. This made nine in all, the others being the New York, New England, Genesee (including circuits in Upper and Lower Canada), South Carolina, Virginia, Baltimore and Philadelphia conferences.

==== General Conference of 1816 ====
The year 1816 marked the end of an era for the MEC. Asbury and Jesse Lee died that year, and Coke had died in 1815 while conducting missionary work for the British Conference. All of these men had championed the itinerant model of ministry. Following the death of Asbury, the 1816 General Conference elected Enoch George and Robert Richford Roberts to serve as bishops along with McKendree.

The General Conference disapproved of pew rental as a means of raising funds (but this was largely ignored as more and more Methodist churches began charging pew rent). It also expressed concerns over perceived laxity in Methodist standards of discipline, doctrine, dress and sacramental practice.

There was also concern over the appearance in some places of false doctrines, such as Arianism, Socinianism and Pelagianism. In order to provide adequate preparation to candidates for the ministry, the bishops were directed to create a Course of Study featuring a prescribed reading list, the first effort to introduce a formal process for ministry preparation. The Course of Study reflected American Methodism's continued reliance on British theologians. The reading list included Wesley's Sermons and Notes, John Fletcher's four-volume Checks to Antinomianism, Joseph Benson's Sermons on Various Occasions and Coke's six-volume Commentary on the Holy Bible. These works would guide American Methodist belief for the next century.

The General Conference placed Joshua Soule and Thomas Mason in charge of the Methodist Book Concern, the church's publishing house. The conference also ordered the publication of a monthly periodical, The Methodist Magazine. This magazine soon acquired a circulation of 10,000 at a time when popular secular periodicals had circulations between 4,000 and 5,000. The Methodist Magazine, later renamed the Methodist Quarterly Review, was published continually from 1818 until 1932 and had a longer life than any other religious publication.

The church continued to grow during this period. Sometime around 1800, Methodism expanded into the region around Cincinnati, Ohio, and by 1807, the first Methodist church had been built in the city. In 1809, William Case was sent as a missionary to Detroit in the Michigan Territory and was followed a year later by William Mitchell, who organized what is today Central United Methodist Church and the oldest Protestant congregation in Michigan.

In 1808, Matthew P. Sturdevant established a new circuit along the banks of the Tombigbee River in Alabama. In the years 1809 and 1810, John Crane established new circuits in Upper Louisiana in what is today the state of Missouri. After the War of 1812, the Canadian conferences withdrew from the American church to become the Methodist Episcopal Church of Canada.

==== Camp meetings ====
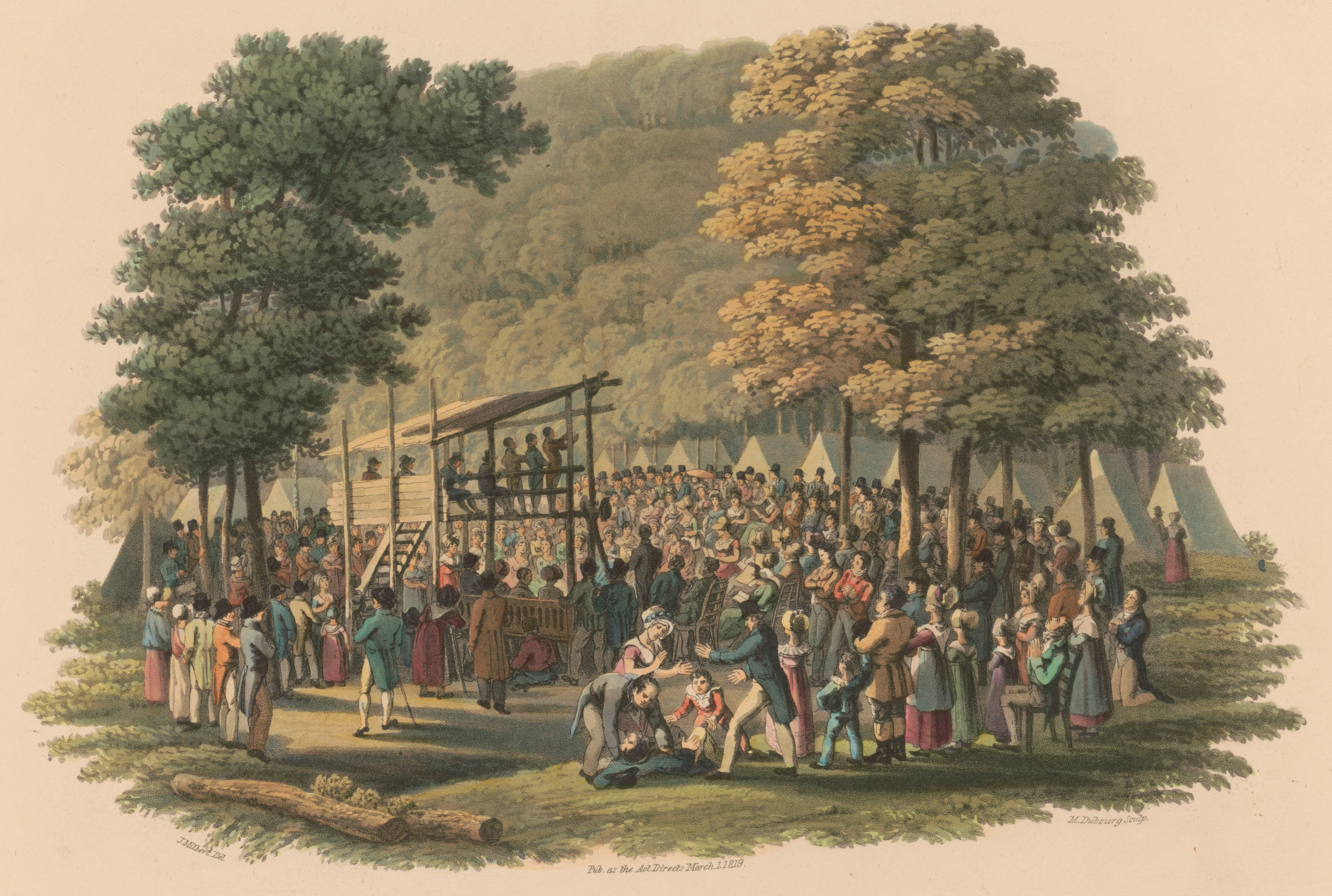
An 1819 engraving of a Methodist camp meeting

The Presbyterian-led Cane Ridge Revival of 1801 birthed the first definitive camp meeting in American history, and this multi-day revivalistic event would be enthusiastically adopted by the Methodist Episcopal Church. For Methodists, these meetings were important evangelistic tools, but they were often criticized for the emotionalism and enthusiasm displayed, such as crying, shouting, jerking and falling. Methodist leaders such as Asbury expected order to be maintained, but they were not opposed to the emotional effects often seen in these meetings.

Other Methodists, such as John Fanning Watson, disagreed. In his book Methodist Error; or, Friendly, Christian Advice: To Those Methodists Who Indulge in Extravagant Religious Emotions and Bodily Exercises, published anonymously in 1814, Watson argued that such emotional displays were not appropriate on the part of converted Christians in public worship but should be restricted to the time of conversion or, for those already converted, to private devotion at home.

While historians have emphasized the importance of camp meetings on the American frontier, camp meetings were vibrant parts of Methodist community life in the more settled areas along the East Coast as well. For example, some of the most significant meetings at the start of the 19th century occurred on the Delmarva Peninsula, a place that became known as the "Garden of Methodism". Camp meetings were often held simultaneously with Methodist quarterly meetings (circuit business meetings held four times each year). In America, quarterly meetings had already evolved into two-day religious festivals, so it became standard practice for quarterly conferences to make one of their warm-weather sessions a camp meeting. By 1811, Methodists held 400 to 500 camp meetings annually, and historian Nathan Hatch estimates that these events drew in over one million people annually.

==== African American Methodists ====
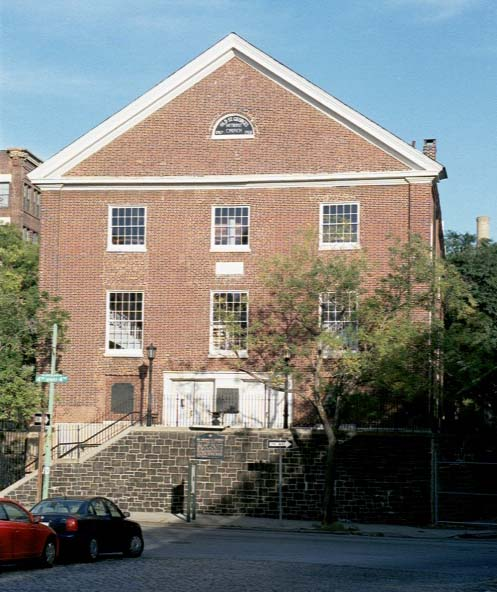
Built in 1769, St. George's Church in Philadelphia is the oldest Methodist church in continuous use in the United States.

The Methodist Episcopal Church had committed itself to the antislavery cause, but it became difficult to maintain this stance as Methodism spread to slaveholding areas. To avoid alienating southerners, the 1808 General Conference allowed annual conferences to form their own policies related to buying and selling slaves. In 1816, it amended the Discipline's prohibition on officeholders owning slaves to apply only in states where emancipation was legal.

Another problem was that the MEC failed to give African American members full equality and inclusion in the church. This failure led to the development of segregated church institutions under white supervision. In 1800, the General Conference authorized bishops to ordain African American men as local deacons. Richard Allen of Philadelphia was the first to be ordained under this rule.

Earlier in 1794, Allen had led other African American members to withdraw from St. George's Church in response to racial discrimination by white church members. Under Allen's leadership and with Asbury's blessing, they founded Bethel African Methodist Episcopal Church.

Under the leadership of Allen and Daniel Coker, Bethel Church and other African American congregations left the MEC to establish the African Methodist Episcopal Church (AME) in 1816. According to Nathan Bangs, the MEC might have lost nearly 900 African American members to the AME Church in its first year alone.

Other African American members left to form separate churches as well. A group based in Wilmington, Delaware, founded the African Union Church in 1813, and the African Methodist Episcopal Zion Church was formed by African American Methodists in New York City. These groups left over not receiving the prerogatives and standing within the denomination that their white counterparts were given, such as ordination, representation and property ownership. Despite these losses, however, the majority of African American Methodists remained within the MEC.

=== Antebellum era (1817–1860) ===
==== Quest for respectability ====
In the 19th century, the Methodist Episcopal Church became the largest and most widespread denomination in the United States, boasting "the most extensive national organization other than the Federal government". In the Antebellum era, a new generation of leaders, upwardly mobile preachers and laity, would lead the Methodist Episcopal Church toward social respectability and inclusion within America's Protestant establishment. In the process, the MEC would experience what some contemporaries and later interpreters considered a "softening of discipline, embrace of the world, compromise of fundamental Wesleyan practices and precepts, abandonment of the evangelistic mission to society's marginalized, and loss of Methodism's prophetic nerve."

This included the transformation of the itinerant system into a more settled ministry. A second generation of Methodist preachers were unable to realize Wesley's original vision of a "celibate, self-sacrificing, and ascetic brotherhood". Increasingly, preachers were appointed for two-year terms to single-congregation charges called "stations". This allowed stationed pastors to live in the same community every day rather than making short visits every two, four or six weeks as in earlier years. Stationing was facilitated by the construction of parsonages. By 1858, the northern MEC had built 2,174 parsonages for the use of over 5,000 traveling preachers.

Stationed preachers and their wives posed problems for the system of class meetings on which Methodist societies were based, and Methodists were noting the decline of the classes by the 1820s. The functions that class meetings and class leaders traditionally provided—discipline and spiritual formation—were taken over by the preacher and his wife. Alternative small group settings were provided by the Sunday school and the local missionary and tract societies. The meetings of these organizations featured prayer, hymns, testimony and exhortation. To accommodate these educational and missional efforts, Methodists began building larger and more impressive facilities, often on main streets, in the 1830s and 1840s.

By the 1830s, loud voices had emerged against the transformation of the denomination. These voices were nostalgic and disappointed over the end of the Asbury era, which was characterized as one of greater religious enthusiasm, revivals and camp meetings. These voices were dismissed as "croakers" because it seemed they never missed an opportunity to complain, whether in the pulpit, through conference sermons or on the pages of Methodist periodicals.

==== New Institutions ====
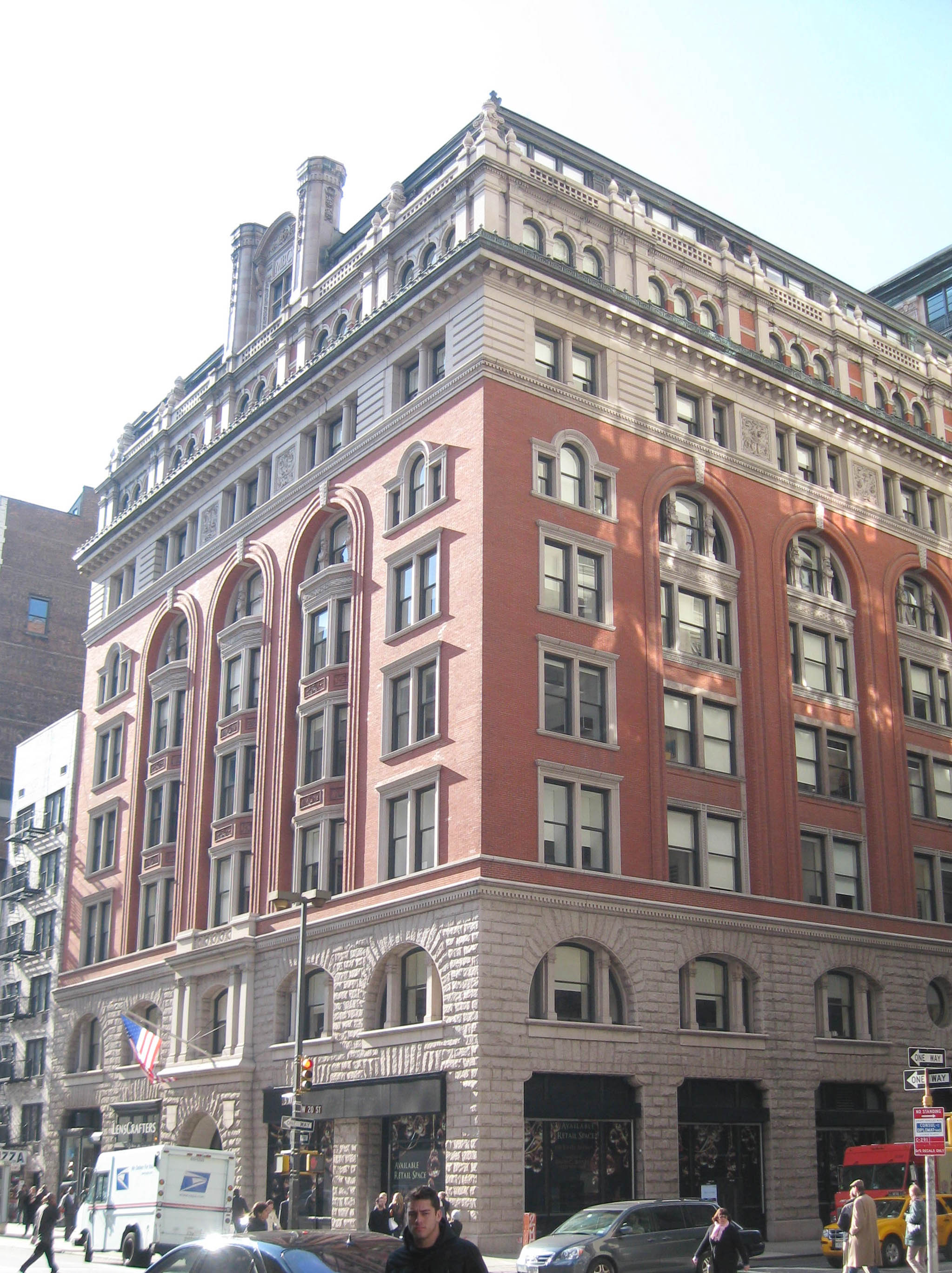
The former Methodist Book Concern building at 150 Fifth Avenue, New York City, designed by Edward H. Kendall

Nathan Bangs is credited with leading the campaign for respectability. As the denomination's book agent and editor of both The Methodist Magazine and the weekly Christian Advocate, Bangs was the MEC's most visible and influential leader up until the 1860s. Under his watch, the Christian Advocate became the most widely circulated periodical in the world, and the Book Concern was transformed from merely a distributor of British reprints into a full-fledged publishing house providing literature for adults, children, and Sunday schools, as well as producing tracts for the Methodist Tract Society organized in 1817.

By the 1820s, Methodists were ready to build institutions of higher education. Citing the lack of non-Calvinist colleges and seminaries, the 1820 General Conference encouraged annual conferences to establish ones under Methodist control. Around two hundred were founded by the Civil War. These included Augusta College (1822), McKendree University (1828),Wesleyan University (1831), Emory University (1836), Emory and Henry College (1836), DePauw University (originally Indiana Asbury University in 1837), and what would become the Boston University School of Theology (1839). In addition, the Methodists became affiliated with already existing Dickinson College and Allegheny College in 1833. Methodists invested in education for women as well, founding Greensboro College in North Carolina, Valparaiso University in Indiana (originally the Valparaiso Male and Female College), and Wesleyan College in Georgia.

==== Antebellum missions ====
Nathan Bangs was also instrumental in the establishment of the Missionary Society of the Methodist Episcopal Church in 1819 to help support foreign mission work. While missionaries were appointed and supervised by the bishops, the missionary society raised funds to support them.

In 1834, a Liberian Annual Conference was organized. While itinerating in Liberia, Bishop Levi Scott ordained the first African deacons and elders in 1853. In 1856, the General Conference created a new position, the missionary bishop, to oversee the foreign mission fields. The Liberian Conference elected Francis Burns to be its missionary bishop, and he was consecrated in 1858, becoming the Methodist Episcopal Church's first African American bishop. As a missionary bishop, Burns was not considered a general superintendent of the church, and his episcopal authority was limited to his assigned field.

Domestically, there were efforts among Native American tribes, such as the Wyandotte of Ohio; the Creek, Cherokee, Choctaw and Chickasaw in the Southeast; and the Ojibwe, Oneida and Chippewa of the Great Lakes region. In the late 1840s, separate Conferences were formed for German-speaking members of the Methodist Episcopal Church who were not members of the Evangelical Association or the United Brethren in Christ (later merged to form the Evangelical United Brethren (EUB)). Among these was the St. Louis German Conference, which in 1925 was assimilated into the surrounding English-speaking conferences, including the Illinois Conference.

==== Origins of the holiness movement ====
In 1840, Phoebe Palmer took over leadership of a prayer meeting for women in New York City begun by her sister, Sarah. Participants of what was known as the Tuesday Meeting for the Promotion of Holiness sought to receive the blessing of Christian perfection or entire sanctification. Christian perfection was a doctrine that had been taught by Wesley but had in the words of religion scholar Randall Balmer, "faded into the background" as Methodists gained respectability and became solidly middle class.

Palmer had experienced entire sanctification herself in 1837 when she made "an entire surrender" to God of everything in her life. Through her evangelism and writings, Palmer articulated an "altar theology" that outlined a "shorter way" to entire sanctification, achieved through placing oneself on a metaphorical altar by sacrificing worldly desires. Once this consecration was complete, the Christian could be assured that God would sanctify them. In the words of historian Jeffrey Williams, "Palmer made sanctification an instantaneous act accomplished through the exercise of faith."

Under her leadership, men began to regularly attend the meetings, including prominent Methodists such as Nathan Bangs, Bishop Leonidas Hamline, and Stephen Olin. By the 1850s, people from nearly every Protestant denomination were attending the meetings and similar meetings were started around the country, eventually numbering around 200 by 1886. These meetings formed the impetus for a new interdenominational holiness movement promoted by such publications as the Guide to Christian Perfection, which published written testimonies from those who had experienced entire sanctification. The movement was largely urban and mainly led by lay people.

==== Conflict over episcopal polity and abolitionism ====
In the 1820s, a reform movement emerged within the Methodist Episcopal Church to challenge its hierarchical structure. In particular, reformers wanted presiding elders to be chosen by conference elections rather than episcopal appointment. They also desired representation for local preachers (two-thirds of all Methodist clergy) and lay people in annual and general conferences. These proposals, particularly election of presiding elders, were interpreted as a threat to the church's episcopal polity and, therefore, a violation of the Restrictive Regulations according to Bishop McKendree and Joshua Soule, author of the restrictive rules.

In the aftermath of the 1824 General Conference, a number of "union societies" were formed to advocate for reform, while church leaders took actions to suppress any effort to alter the church's episcopal polity. Presiding elders in the Baltimore Conference began disciplinary proceedings against twenty-five laymen and eleven local preachers for advocating reform. Meanwhile, the number of union societies grew. The refusal of the 1828 General Conference to endorse democratic reforms led to a definitive division within the church and the organization of the Methodist Protestant Church.

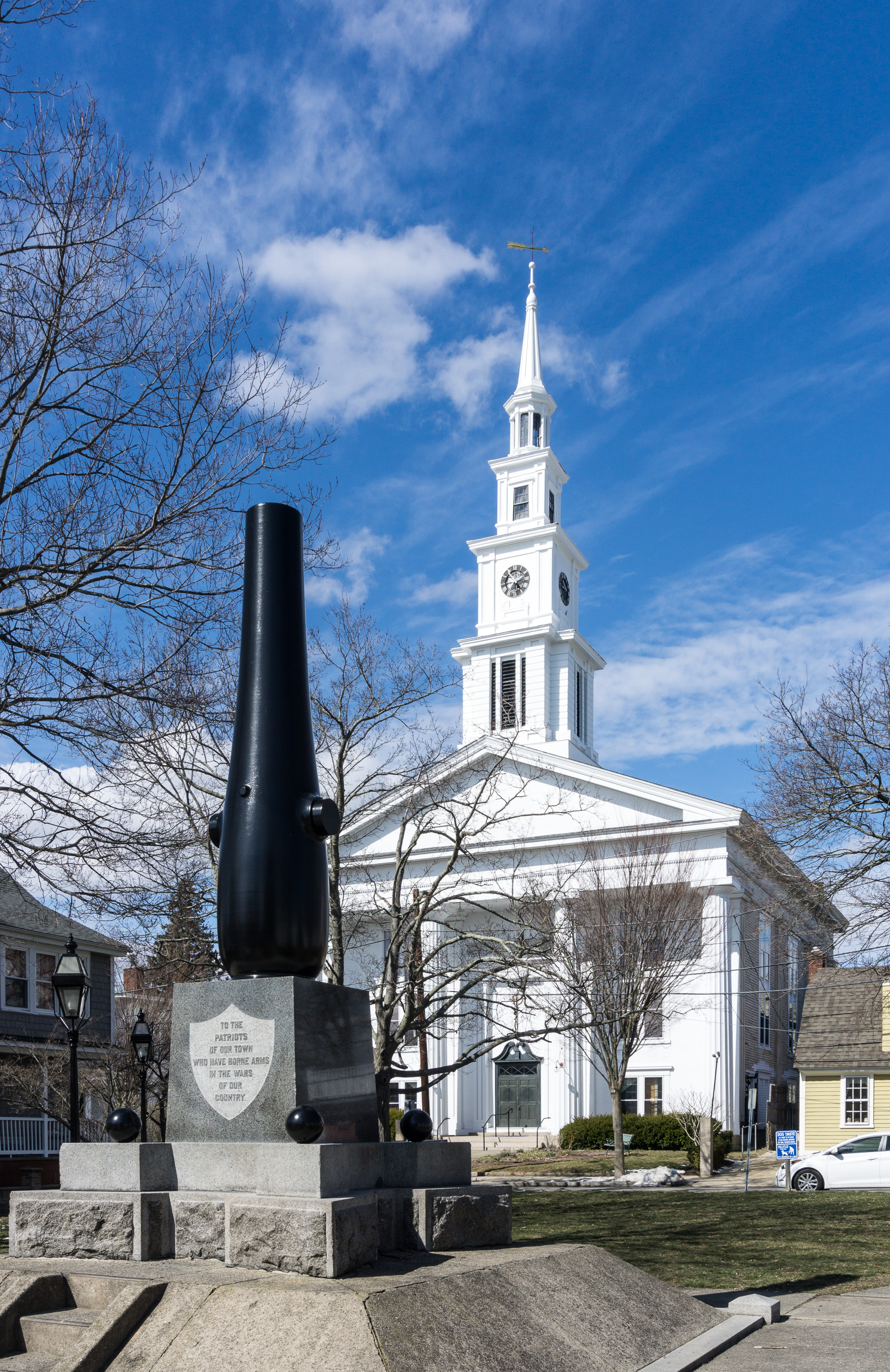
Warren United Methodist Church (built in 1844) and a Civil War Memorial in Warren Common

In 1820 (the same year as the Missouri Compromise), the Methodist Episcopal Church ended its ban on preachers and leadership owning slaves. Around the same time, it became closely tied to the American Colonization Society and its own Liberian Mission, which proposed sending freedmen to evangelize Africa. According to historian Donald Mathews, "[T]here was no religious denomination more closely connected with colonization than the Methodist Episcopal Church".

In the 1830s, abolitionists within the Methodist Episcopal Church sought to recover the church's antislavery witness. Notable abolitionist activity took place within the New England Annual Conference where Orange Scott and others used camp meetings and conference structures to attack slavery and the suppression of antislavery sentiments in church publications. Despite their efforts, Nathan Bangs kept abolitionist messages out of church periodicals, and the bishops also sought to suppress abolitionists for the sake of church unity. Abolitionist clergy were censured, brought up on disciplinary charges, and appointed to difficult assignments as punishment. Southern Methodists responded by defending the morality of slavery and asserting that, as a political matter, slavery was an issue that was outside of the church's authority to adjudicate.

When pro-slavery forces prevailed at the 1840 General Conference, Scott and his allies La Roy Sunderland and Jotham Horton left the church. Condemning the MEC as "not only a slave-holding, but a slavery defending, Church", these men organized a new Methodist church on explicitly abolitionist grounds in 1843 called the Wesleyan Methodist Church (not to be confused with the British church of the same name).

Writing in 1896, Methodist Episcopal Church systematic theologian Daniel Steele noted that among Methodist dogmaticians "there is a complete unanimity as to the possibility of instant and entire purification in this life, in answer to a faith fully developed and adequate."

==== Southern schism of 1844 ====
Despite the Wesleyan Methodist secession, the anti-slavery movement among northern Methodists continued to grow, with conferences passing anti-slavery resolutions preceding the 1844 General Conference. Over the objections of southerners, General Conference created a committee on slavery that recommended the conference act to "separate slavery from the church". Most damaging to church unity, the General Conference ordered Bishop James Osgood Andrew, a slave owner, to "desist from the exercise of this office so long as this impediment remains" on the basis that his owning slaves would prevent him from effectively ministering as a bishop in the North.

A committee of nine was appointed to study the possibility of an amicable separation of the church. It proposed a Plan of Separation that would provide for determining a geographic boundary between the two churches and a peaceful division of property, such as the Book Concern and the pension resources of the Chartered Fund. Despite concerns that this proposal would cause "war and strife in the border conferences", it was approved by General Conference. As it required an amendment to the Restrictive Regulations, however, the plan had to be ratified by three-fourths of the annual conferences and was rejected by the northern conferences.

Nevertheless, the southern conferences proceeded with the Plan of Separation at the Louisville Convention of 1845 and held the first General Conference of the Methodist Episcopal Church, South (MECS) in 1846. This action started a contest between northern and southern conferences to recruit as many border stations and circuits as they could, especially in the Delmarva Peninsula, western Virginia, Kentucky, Ohio and Missouri. Meanwhile, the 1848 MEC General Conference declared that the Plan of Separation had failed to receive the required conference votes and could not be used to legally divide the church. The dispute over the legality of separation and division of the Book Concern's property was not resolved until 1853 when the US Supreme Court rule in Smith v. Swormstedt that the creation of the MECS was legal.

==== Free Methodist schism of 1860 ====
Northern anger surrounding the Fugitive Slave Act of 1850 brought further turmoil to the MEC. The Genesee Conference in New York was most effected. There, reform-minded Methodists led by B. T. Roberts protested slavery as well as other signs of cultural accommodation, such as pew rents (which alienated the poor) and the decline in revivalism and holiness teaching. The conference leadership reacted to this by harassing and expelling Roberts and his colleagues who then went on to organize the Free Methodist Church in 1860.

Concerned about defections to the Free Methodists, the 1860 General Conference declared owning slaves to be "contrary to the laws of God and nature" and inconsistent with the church's rules. This sparked a wave of petitions from border conferences demanding a return to a neutral position on slavery. The Baltimore annual conference split in half, with pro-slavery members seceding from the MEC. Kentucky and Missouri would soon become religious battlegrounds as Methodists divided into pro-Union and pro-Confederate camps.

=== Civil War and Reconstruction (1861–1877) ===
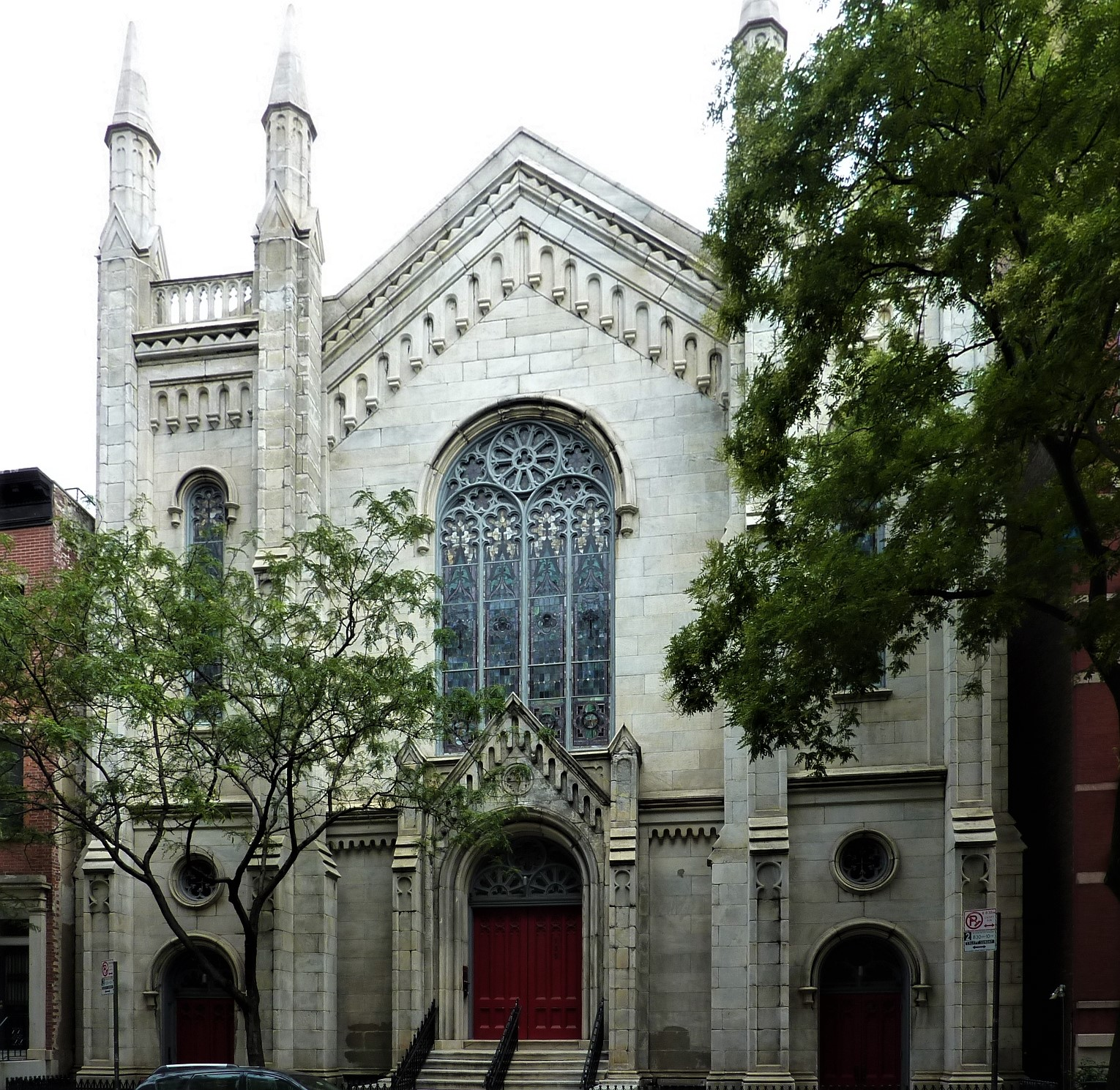
Washington Square Methodist Episcopal Church, built in 1860

The Methodist split over slavery paralleled a national split. The controversy over slavery led the Southern states to secede from the Union and form the Confederate States of America, actions that led to the American Civil War. No denomination was more active in supporting the Union than the Methodist Episcopal Church. Historian Richard Carwardine argues that for many Methodists, Abraham Lincoln's election as US president in 1860 heralded the arrival of the kingdom of God in America. They were moved into action by a vision of freedom for slaves, freedom from the terror unleashed on godly abolitionists, release from the Slave Power's evil grip on the state, and a new direction for the Union.

Methodists contributed many chaplains to the Union Army and were heavily involved in the Christian Commission, a Protestant organization that provided religious services to soldiers and contributed to revivals within the army between 1863 and 1865. The Methodist family magazine Ladies' Repository, which provided moral uplift to women and children, promoted Christian family activism. It portrayed the War as a great moral crusade against a decadent Southern civilization corrupted by slavery. It recommended activities that family members could perform in order to aid the Union cause.

While the MEC was overwhelmingly supportive of the war effort, a minority of northern Methodists disagreed with the church's political stance. In Ohio, Methodists who sympathized with the anti-war Copperheads coalesced into a new denomination, the Christian Union.

After the Confederacy's defeat, Methodists formed a major element of the popular support for the Radical Republicans with their hard line toward the white South. The Methodist Ministers Association of Boston, meeting two weeks after Lincoln's assassination, called for a hard line against the Confederate leadership:

Resolved, That no terms should be made with traitors, no compromise with rebels. ... That we hold the National authority bound by the most solemn obligation to God and man to bring all the civil and military leaders of the rebellion to trial by due course of law, and when they are clearly convicted, to execute them.

In a highly controversial move, the Northern MEC used the army to seize control of Methodist churches in large Southern cities over the vehement protests of the Methodist Episcopal Church, South. Historian Ralph Morrow reports:

A War Department order of November, 1863, applicable to the Southwestern states of the Confederacy, authorized the Northern Methodists to occupy "all houses of worship belonging to the Methodist Episcopal Church South in which a loyal minister, appointed by a loyal bishop of said church, does not officiate."

During Reconstruction, Northern denominations all sent missionaries, teachers and activists to the South to help the Freedmen. Only the Methodists made many converts, however. Activists sponsored by the northern Methodist church played a major role in the Freedmen's Bureau, notably in such key educational roles as the Bureau's state superintendent or assistant superintendent of education for Virginia, Florida, Alabama and South Carolina.

The focus on social problems paved the way for the Social Gospel movement a few years later. Matthew Simpson, a famous bishop, played a leading role in mobilizing the Northern Methodists for the cause. His biographer calls him the "High Priest of the Radical Republicans". MEC women would use the leadership and organizational skills gained during the war to establish orphanages and old age homes. A major driver in the creation of such institutions was the Woman's Home Missionary Society, founded in 1882.

=== Post–Civil War divisions ===
In 1895, during the 19th century holiness movement, Methodist Episcopal minister Phineas F. Bresee founded the Church of the Nazarene in Los Angeles with the help of Joseph Pomeroy Widney. The Church of the Nazarene separated over a perceived need to minister further to the urban poor, the origins of its Nazarene name. Several other churches, roughly 15 holiness denominations that had also split from the Methodist Episcopal Church, joined the Church of the Nazarene in 1907 and 1908, and it became international soon thereafter. The new Church of the Nazarene retained the Methodist Episcopal tradition of education and now operates 56 educational institutions around the world, including eight liberal arts colleges in the United States, each tied to an "educational region".

== Beliefs and standards ==
The Methodist Episcopal Church's doctrines are the Articles of Religion along with an emphasis on "Universal Redemption, the Free Agency of Man, Regeneration or the New Birth, Adoption, the Witness of the Spirit, and Entire Sanctification or Perfect Love". Probationers who sought full membership into the Methodist Episcopal Church affirmed "a desire to flee from the wrath to come, and to be saved from their sins" which was to be evidenced by "observing the General Rules" delineated the connexion's standards.

Its standards included a ban against marriages with unconverted persons; a prohibition on the buying, selling and use of spiritous liquors; abstinence from tobacco; and an injunction not to wear "gold and costly apparel". The Methodist Episcopal Church forbade the "singing of those songs, or reading those books, which do not tend to the knowledge or love of God" as well as "dancing; playing at games of chance; attending theaters, horse races, circuses, dancing parties, or patronizing dancing schools, or taking such other amusements as are obviously of misleading or questionable moral tendency."

== Divisions and mergers ==
The following list notes divisions and mergers that occurred in Methodist Episcopal Church history.

1767: The Rev. Philip William Otterbein, (1726–1813) of Baltimore and Martin Boehm started Methodist evangelism among German-speaking immigrants to form the United Brethren in Christ. This development had to do only with language. Methodist Episcopal Bishop Francis Asbury later preached at Otterbein's 1813 funeral. In 1968 it merged to form the United Methodist Church.

1784: Historic "Christmas Conference" held at Lovely Lane Chapel in waterfront Baltimore (at Lovely Lane, off German (now Redwood) Street between South Calvert Street and South Street) and convened to organize the future Methodist Episcopal Church and also several ministers ordain Francis Asbury as bishop.

1793: The first recognized split from the Methodist Episcopal Church was led by a preacher named James O'Kelly who wanted clergy to be free to refuse to serve where the bishop appointed them. He organized the "Republican Methodists", later called simply the Christian Church or Christian Connection, that through its successors and mergers eventually became part of the future United Church of Christ in 1957.

1800: The Evangelical Association was organized by Jacob Albright to serve German-speaking Methodists.

1813: The Reformed Methodist Church was organized under the leadership of Methodist preachers Pliny Brett and Elijah Bailey. This group was concentrated in Massachusetts and Vermont. It merged into the Churches of Christ in Christian Union in 1952.

1816: The African Methodist Episcopal Church was organized in Philadelphia by Richard Allen for Wesley followers/African-Americans. Bishop Francis Asbury had ordained him earlier in 1799.

1820: The African Methodist Episcopal Zion Church was organized in New York.

1828: The Canadians formed their own Methodist Church.

1828: The Methodist Protestant Church split off under Nicholas Snethen, who had earlier argued against the O'Kelly split, along with Asa Shinn. The issue was the role of laity in governance of the church. In 1939, it merged.

1843: The Wesleyan Methodist Church was organized. In 1968, the Wesleyan Methodist and Pilgrim Holiness denominations merged to form the Wesleyan Church.

1844: The Methodist Episcopal Church, South, split off because of the slavery controversy. Briefly, during the American Civil War, 1861–1865, it adopted the title of "The Methodist Episcopal Church in the Confederate States of America". In 1939, it merged into The Methodist Church, (which endures until 1968 and a subsequent merger with the Evangelical United Brethren Church forming the current U.M.C.).

1860: The Free Methodist Church was organized by B. T. Roberts and others. The differences centered around a traditional/rural vs. modern/urban ethos.

1870: The Colored Methodist Episcopal Church was organized from the Methodist Episcopal Church, South, to serve African-American Methodists. Later changed its name to Christian Methodist Episcopal Church.

1895: The Church of the Nazarene was organized by Phineas F. Bresee.

1895: Fire Baptized Holiness Church

1897: Pentecostal Holiness Church of North Carolina. Merged with the Fire Baptized Holiness Church in 1911 and formed what is now known as the International Pentecostal Holiness Church.

1897: The Pilgrim Holiness Church was organized.

1939: The Methodist Episcopal Church, the Methodist Episcopal Church, South, and the Methodist Protestant Church merged to form The Methodist Church.

1946: The Evangelical Church (Albright's Evangelical Association) and Otterbein's heritage in the Church of the United Brethren in Christ merged to form the Evangelical United Brethren Church.

1968: The Evangelical United Brethren Church and The Methodist Church merged to form The United Methodist Church. Select churches who refused formed the Evangelical Church of North America.

2022: The Global Methodist Church was organized and has absorbed thousands of United Methodist congregations that the UMC approved their requests to schism.

== See also ==
- List of bishops of the United Methodist Church
- Wesleyanism
