= Christian Newcomer =

American Catholic bishop (1749–1830)

Christian Newcomer (1749–1830) was an American farmer and preacher, who was elected on 5 May 1813 as the third bishop of the Church of the United Brethren in Christ.

== Ordination ==
Peculiarly, Newcomer was elected Bishop by the Church before he was even ordained to the ministry (though he did hold the status of a full minister). Philip William Otterbein and Martin Boehm, the founders of the U.B. Church, had not established a succession in the U.B. ministry by any rite of ordination. The Miami Annual Conference, therefore, in August 1813 addressed a letter to Otterbein asking him to ordain by the laying on of hands "one or more ministers who afterwards may perform the same for others." The letter reached Otterbein in late September 1813, with Newcomer visiting him soon thereafter. It was decided that Otterbein should ordain Newcomer, Joseph Hoffman and Frederick Shaffer (two other U.B. ministers). Accordingly, on 2 October 1813, after a solemn period of worship and meditation, with the assistance of an elder of the Methodist Episcopal Church, the Rev. William Ryland, Otterbein ordained by the laying on of hands these three men, the first to be ordained in the Church of the United Brethren in Christ. This taking place just a few weeks before Otterbein's death.

== Early life ==
Christian Newcomer was the son of Wolfgang and Elizabeth (Weller/Weber) Newcomer, the second of three sons born into this family, which included five daughters as well. Christian's grandfather, Peter Newcomer, brought his family to America from Switzerland some time between 1719 and 1727. They settled in Lancaster County, Pennsylvania. They were of distinctly Mennonite heritage. Christian was baptized in and became a member of the Mennonite Church.

On 31 March 1772, he married Elizabeth Baer. He seems to have had little romantic feeling toward her, writing in his Journal "I had to seek a housekeeper, which I found in Miss Elizabeth Baer, and entered with her into a state of matrimony." When she died thirty-nine years later, however, he showed his affection had matured, as he wrote "This evening at 6 o'clock my dear companion departed this life, and resigned her immortal spirit into the arms of Jesus her Savior. Peace be to thy ashes: for many years thou has been a staff and comfort unto me; soon we shall be reunited where parting will be no more." Christian and Elizabeth Newcomer had four children: Andrew, Jacob, David, and Elizabeth. After his wife's death Christian made his home with Andrew.

As a young man, Christian Newcomer learned the carpenter's trade. In time, he inherited the family farm, so took up farming instead. Throughout these early years, his friends continually urged him to preach. This troubled him greatly. In 1775, to escape the issue, he sold his farm in Lancaster County and moved to another he had bought at Beaver Creek, Maryland, seven miles south of Hagerstown in Washington County. Shortly after moving he became seriously ill. He believed he was dying and cried out for divine help. The illness subsided, he was left with a determination no longer to fight the call to preach. Shortly after his recovery he came under the itinerant preaching of Otterbein and Boehm and resolved to throw aside his inhibitions and go forth to preach. Newcomer was also influenced in ministry by a close associate of Otterbein's, George Adam Geeting. Indeed, as Koontz states "Ere long the growing group known as Otterbein's People came to recognize not three great spiritual leaders (i.e., Otterbein, Boehm and Geeting), but four, and Newcomer was the fourth." The probable date for the beginning of Newcomer's itinerant ministry is 1777.

== His Journal ==
More is known of Newcomer's life and ministry than of any of the other United Brethren leaders because of the extensive journal he kept, in which he recorded his own activities, contemporary activities in the U.B. Church, and many public events, as well. Not long before his death, Newcomer and a long-time friend and co-worker, (the Rev.) John Hildt (who was a member of the Baltimore Church) began work on Newcomer's journal in preparation for publishing. Shortly after his death, the U.B. Conference appointed a committee to examine the original manuscripts, also with a view toward publication. Hildt was asked to undertake the task of transcribing, translating into English, and editing the personally written biography and journal of his close friend.

In 1834, four years after Newcomer's death, The Life and Journal of the Rev'd Christian Newcomer, Late Bishop of the Church of the United Brethren in Christ was first published. In covers primarily the period of 27 October 1795 to 4 March 1830. A copy of this Journal resides in the Library of Congress, where it has even served to establish definite dates and events of early U.S. history.

Although there is scant record of Newcomer's first eighteen years of ministry, his name does appear in the lists of the U.B. conferences of 1789 (at Otterbein's parsonage in Baltimore) and 1791 (at John Spangler's in York County, Pennsylvania).

== See also ==
- List of bishops of the United Methodist Church
