= United Christian Church =

The denomination known as the United Christian Church (UCC) is an American evangelical body of Christians with roots in the Radical Pietistic movement of Martin Boehm and Philip William Otterbein. This group may often be confused with local congregations and churches of other denominations that also use the name United Christian Church.

== History ==
Those who began the United Christian Church separated from the Church of the United Brethren in Christ between the years of 1862 to 1870 over doctrinal differences of opinion. Led by Rev. George W. Hoffman, for a number of years the separatists were known as Hoffmanites. Hoffman opposed infant baptism, membership in secret societies, slavery, and the bearing of arms in war. He and others believed that some resolutions of the East Pennsylvania Conference of United Brethren were weak on the issue of bearing of arms, to the point of allowing members to do so if they chose. They also rejected the doctrine of total depravity, which was affirmed by the Church of the United Brethren in 1857. In 1877 these scattered believers formally organized and adopted a confession of faith. The name "United Christian Church" was adopted in 1878.

This body is an orthodox Trinitarian denomination, with emphasis on the inspiration of the Scriptures, justification by faith, regeneration, and entire sanctification. Baptism, the Lord's supper, and feet washing are considered ordinances, with the mode of baptism being optional. A conference is held annually.

According to a study conducted by the Association of Statisticians of American Religious Bodies, the United Christian Church had 11 congregations with 770 members in Pennsylvania in 1990.
