= Church of the United Brethren in Christ (New Constitution) =

Protestant Christian denomination

The Church of the United Brethren in Christ (New Constitution) was a Protestant Christian denomination with Arminian theology, roots in the Mennonite and German Reformed communities, and close ties to Methodism that formed in 1889 by a majority of the Church of the United Brethren in Christ when that denomination (of a similar tradition) amended the church constitution to give local conferences proportional representation at the General Conference; to allow laymen to serve as delegates to General Conference; and to allow United Brethren members to hold membership in secret societies. The constitution's amendment procedure of the day made amendments all but impossible, but denominational leaders felt these changes were necessary for the good of the church.

A minority faction contended the changes were invalid since they were not adopted by all church members. They argued that the majority had effectively seceded from the church by adopting them. Led by Milton Wright, the only one of the church's six bishops to side with them, they reorganized under the original constitution as adopted in 1841.

For the next 57 years, both churches operated under the name Church of the United Brethren in Christ. However, the majority faction added the designation "New Constitution" to its name, while the minority faction added the designation "Old Constitution." However, both claimed 1800 as their founding date, with heritage dating to 1767, and the same history up to 1889.

The Church of the United Brethren in Christ (New Constitution) ceased to exist when it merged with the Evangelical Church in 1946 to form the Evangelical United Brethren Church (EUB), which in turn merged in 1968 with the Methodists to form the United Methodist Church. The Church of the United Brethren in Christ (Old Constitution) is now known as the Church of the United Brethren in Christ.

In the 1968 merger with the Methodists, all property deeds of the Evangelical United Brethren were ceded to the United Methodist Church. In the Northwest United States, over fifty Evangelical United Brethren churches immediately negotiated to purchase their deeds back and depart. They formed the Evangelical Church of North America (ECNA). Many of the former Evangelical United Brethren churches in Pennsylvania joined the new ECNA, even though their deeds belonged to the Methodists, prompting a ten-year dispute. Eventually, the Methodists gave the dissenting Pennsylvania churches the opportunity to purchase their deeds for token amounts. The churches did so with haste and were much relieved to have their property back and be in an organization of former EUB churches.

At about the same time, the ECNA and Canadian Evangelical Church began talks and proposals of merging. The ECNA composed and printed a compatible draft of new By-laws for the possible merger. When the Pennsylvania churches reviewed the draft they requested wording that would guarantee local churches own their property. The ECNA conveyed it was not necessary since there was no overt statement of property ownership currently in the By-Laws. With sensitivities heightened by the recent regaining of their deeds, the churches asked for wording that would prevent future changes in the by-Laws claiming church property. When the ECNA refused, the Pennsylvania churches requested withdrawal without contest for property, which the ECNA reluctantly granted. Anticipating departure, the Pennsylvania churches formed the Association of Evangelical Churches in 1981, and stated in their first By-Law that each church shall hold full title to its property. As an added precaution, it further stated that the paragraph on owning church property could not be amended without a unanimous vote of its member churches.
