= Samuel Hiestand =

American bishop (1781–1838)

Samuel Hiestand (March 3, 1781 – October 11, 1838) was an American Bishop of the Church of the United Brethren in Christ, elected in 1833. He was the ninth Bishop of this Christian denomination.

== Birth and family ==
"I wish to say no less to his honor than what follows, which is based upon authentic record, personal knowledge, and statements made to me by Joseph Hiestand, an older brother of Samuel. Bishop Samuel Hiestand was born at Shenandoah in Page County, Virginia, on March 3, 1781. He was the sixth son of Jacob Hiestand [a Mennonite from Lancaster County], who was drowned in the Shenandoah River while attempting to cross in a canoe, which upset. Samuel Hiestand's mother [Maria Elisabeth Brumbach] was a native of [ Müsen, Nassau-Siegen ] Germany. His grandfather [Heinrich] Hiestand was also a native of [ Ibersheim ] Germany, and emigrated to Lancaster County, Pennsylvania, in 1727. Samuel Hiestand emigrated to Fairfield County, Ohio, in 1804, and was married September 24th, 1809, to Mary Margaret Raudabaugh, daughter of Nicholas Raudabaugh, and sister to Mrs. John Philip Powell. She was born in Schuylkill County, Pennsylvania, June 1st, 1795. Two of Samuel Hiestand's brothers, [Abraham and John], three of his sons, [Tobias, Samuel, and Jonas all of Darke County, Ohio ], and four of his grandsons are, or were, ministers in the United Brethren Church." Also at least two nephews were ministers in the United Brethren Church: Henry Hiestand (itinerant minister in Pennsylvania, Maryland, and Virginia) and Issac Hiestand (Washington County, Indiana).

== Early life and faith ==
Rev. Samuel Hiestand's parents, grandparents, and several generations before were all Mennonites and not Moravians as reported in some sources. His uncle Henry Brumbach was a Mennonite minister as was his brother Abraham Hiestand, of the Page area, who signed himself in 1794 as "minister of the Church of the Mennonite Society" before becoming a United Brethren minister.

Between adhering to the Mennonite faith and joining the United Brethren Church, Samuel Hiestand's family associated with the Primitive Baptist. They had belonged to the Mennonite congregation at the White House Church, which became the Mill Creek Baptist Church under the mennonite Minister Martin Kauffman (Coffman) Sr. and the Baptist preacher Elder John Koontz (Countz, Koonts,) who owned land next to the Hiestand's. Rev. John Koontz officiated the marriages of Samuel's siblings; Jacob (1784), Abraham (1787 to the widow of Mennonite Minister Jacob Strickler), Elizabeth (1784), Magdalena(1788) and John Hiestand (1794 to the daughter of Mennonite Minister Jacob Strickler). Martin Kauffman Sr. and other former Mennonite members withdrew from this Baptist church during the Revolutionary War when its leaders called for their armed participation. "In 1793 Martin Kauffman, in the name of the 'Separatist Independent Baptist Church,' petitioned the government of Virginia for military exemption for his people similar to that accorded the Mennonites and Quakers."

From Christian Newcomer's Journal we know Samuel's family was already associated with the Church of the United Brethren in Christ and one of its founders as early as 1796. "On the 20th [October 1796] I rode to Messinurte; on the 21st preached here with uncommon liberty, from Matthew 5 — v. 3. At candle light, I spoke at Br. Hiestand's, from Psalm 44-v. 15. The people here are rather hardened: may God have mercy on them." "5th [August 1799]—After considerable enquiry and difficult search, I this day arrived at Br. Hiestand's, where I lodged for the night." "6th [December 1799]—Br. Hiestand preached this day at my house."

After Martin Kauffman Sr.'s death, a disagreement in the practice of slavery resulted in Martin Kauffman Jr., Lewis Seitz (Seits), and Samuel Comer separating from the Mill Creek Church with a group of followers moved to Fairfield County, Ohio, where they formed Pleasant Run Baptist Church, named after the nearby stream, in Pleasant Township. Samuel's mother and nephew Martin Hiestand are listed as members of this congregation in 1806–1809.

Samuel had made a profession of faith in Jesus Christ early in life. But his real conversion occurred under the influence of the Rev. George Benedum, a noted early itinerant minister. Benedum had come from Pennsylvania to Ohio in 1806, two years after the Hiestand brothers. Benedum immediately began preaching, and he and Abraham Hiestand became the leaders of the U.B. movement in Fairfield County and neighboring communities. And it was upon these two Christian leaders the Bishop Christian Newcomer called when he first visited Ohio in 1810.

== Call to ministry ==
Soon after Benedum's arrival Samuel Hiestand was awakened to a new sense of Christian obligation. Almost immediately he began traveling with Benedum through Fairfield County and the surrounding area. Indeed, Samuel came to be regarded Benedum's "apprentice." Samuel's entrance into the ministry was a natural consequence of this association. He was Licensed to Exhort by the Miami Annual Conference of the U.B. Church in 1819. He was Licensed to Preach in 1820.

== Ordained ministry ==
The Rev. Samuel Hiestand became of great service to the U.B. Church nearly from the start of his ministry. For example, though he was licensed to preach only in 1820, he served as the Secretary of the U.B. general conference of 1821. Indeed, the minutes of that conference show he was active in such important deliberations as the mode of Baptism to be practiced by this denomination, the discontinuance of the ordination of Bishops, and the establishment of the office of Presiding Elder as a full-time position. Rev. Hiestand was named one of the incorporators of "The Benevolent Society of the United Brethren in Christ" in the charter granted it by the Ohio Legislature in 1826.

When the Scioto Annual Conference was formed in Ohio in 1824, the Rev. Samuel Hiestand became a "charter member," since he lived within its bounds. His itinerancy within this conference included the Adelphos, Muskingum, Washington, and other circuits.

== Ministerial remuneration ==
Samuel Hiestand ministered in a period when salaries were small. In 1832, for example, while appointed to the Muskingum Circuit, he and the Junior Preacher with him received together only $155.80. Another year, when he received $93 for his services, it was the highest salary any preacher in the Conference received that year. Indeed, no one could ever suggest that the Circuit Riders of the early days entered upon their duties with any idea of becoming wealthy.

== Effectiveness in ministry ==
Samuel Hiestand was a thoroughly effective Pastor. The quiet, thoughtful influence of his Moravian background reflected in his preaching. One who knew him well said this of him:

He was a man of deep piety, a faithful and efficient expounder of the Holy Scriptures, by no means an orator, but a close practical reasoner. No many could be in his company without feeling that in him were sweetly blended the true characteristics of a friend, a Christian and a divine.

== Episcopal ministry ==
The Rev. Hiestand was a member of the 1833 General Conference, too. This Conference authorized the printing establishment of the denomination, and the beginning of a denominational paper. Another action by this Conference also had a large impact on his ministry. Because of the death of Bishop Newcomer three years earlier, Henry Kumler Sr served to the end of the quadrennium as the only Bishop of the Church. The General Conference decided that because of the expanding Church and the increasing demands of time, travel, and the strength of its leaders, three Bishops should be elected. When the voting was complete, Bishop Kumler was re-elected, and Samuel Hiestand and the Rev. William Brown were elected to serve with him!

== Death and funeral ==
"His sickness commenced last spring, with indigestion or dyspepsia, and continued till some days before his death; when he was taken with a nervous fever and head pleurisy. His mind was strong and active, until about three or four days before his exit from this world,—when it became somewhat impaired and flighty. His brother (Joseph) had some conversation with him, on the day before his mind began to fail, and he told him that he had, during that day, felt the sweet drawings of heaven more powerfully, than he ever did before; and when his speech had failed, and he heard any one talk of heaven, he would immediately smile, as if anxious to depart, and to possess it for ever."

"On the 11th of October, 1838, a large concourse of ministers, friends, and neighbors convened at the late residence of Bishop Hiestand. Rev. Jacob Winter preached in German, and Jacob Miller in English, after which the bishop was buried, according to his previous request, beside his pious mother, in the Hiestand burying-ground, in the north-east corner of his farm, in Liberty Township, Fairfield County, Ohio. His beloved wife, Mary Margaret Hiestand, died November 22d, 1858, in Darke County, Ohio, aged 67 years, 5 months, and 27 days."
