= Hiestand =

Hiestand is a surname. Notable people with the surname include:

- Edgar W. Hiestand (1888–1970), American businessman and politician
- Emily Hiestand (born 1947), American writer and poet
- Harry Hiestand (born 1958), American football coach
- John A. Hiestand (1824–1890), American politician
- Joseph Hiestand (1906–2004), American politician
- Samuel Hiestand (1782–1838), American bishop
