= William Ryland =

William Ryland (1770 – January 10, 1846) was a Methodist minister who served several terms as Chaplain of the Senate.

== Early years ==
William Ryland was born in Ireland in 1770. He came to the United States at the age of 18 and settled in Harford County, Maryland. For a time, he engaged in business in Baltimore; on May 28, 1799 a fire in that city damaged his warehouse. In 1802, he became a minister in the Methodist Church, a vocation he continued in for the remainder of his life.

When Mr. Ryland entered the ministry in 1802, a friend bantered him about the matter and told him he would soon give up the ministry. This friend was in the tobacco business. He said to him, "Now, Ryland, I am so confident that you will not continue in this thing, that I promise to send a hundred of my finest cigars every year you remain a minister." For 44 years this promise was faithfully kept. General Jackson enjoyed many of these cigars, although he much preferred a corncob pipe.

== Ministry ==
His first appointment was to the Baltimore circuit, a post in which he served for nine years. While there he also befriended and at times assisted Philip William Otterbein in his ministry, sharing in the ordination of Christian Newcomer and delivering the English translation of Otterbein's funeral sermon. Thereafter, he was sent to Annapolis, Maryland. During this time he was first elected Chaplain of the Senate. He became pastor of the Foundry United Methodist Church in Washington, D.C., as well as Ebenezer Methodist Episcopal Church, in Washington, at which time he became acquainted with Andrew Jackson, who was then a U.S. Senator. Eight days after his inauguration as President of the United States, Jackson sent Ryland a commission as Chaplain of the Navy (sometimes called Chaplain to the Marines) in which he served the last eighteen years of his life. This congregation was known as the Wesley Chapel Station, at the Washington Naval Yards.

Ryland Epworth Church is the product of three congregations. The first, Ryland Church, started in 1843 in Southwest Washington. It was called Ryland Chapel initially, in honor of Rev. William Ryland, former Chaplain of the United States Senate, who had given the land for its construction. Ryland also gave the considerable sum of $1800 to erect a Methodist church that was also named in his honor Ryland Chapel in Galveston, Texas; it was dedicated on January 23, 1843.

== Personal life ==
Ryland married Joanna Mather on December 5, 1796 in Harford, Maryland. Joanna (or Juanna) is buried with him in Congressional Cemetery. Buried with them is his wife's niece, Joanna Mather Ruff. (Note, some amateur genealogists indicate a different spouse for Ryland, however, it is clear that the wife who is buried alongside him in Washington is Joanna Ryland).

Religious titles
Preceded by Reuben Post	Chaplain of the United States Senate; November 17, 1820 – December 8, 1822	Succeeded by Charles Pettit McIlvaine
Preceded by William Staughton	Chaplain of the United States Senate; December 8, 1826 – December 13, 1829	Succeeded by Henry Van Dyke Johns
