= Henry Boehm =

American clergyman and pastor

Rev. Henry Boehm

Henry Boehm (June 8, 1775 – December 28, 1875) was an American clergyman and pastor. The son of noted clergyman Martin Boehm, Henry preferred to be a traveling preacher, going to different churches and lecturing about various religious topics.

Boehm established many Methodist churches and ministerial services throughout the United States, but the first Methodist church was located in Lancaster, Pennsylvania. This is where Henry Boehm preached for over seventy years. His centennial was held in high regard throughout the small villages and cities where Boehm had visited.

Boehm preached his last sermon a few days before his death at age 100 in 1875.
