= Social Brethren =

Christian denomination founded 1867

The Social Brethren is a small body of evangelical Christians located in the Midwestern United States, the Philippines and Canada.

The Social Brethren originated in Saline County, Illinois in 1867. Frank Wright and Hiram T. Brannon were among those who led in the founding of this denomination. The major impetus behind the formation of the Social Brethren was the desire to heal the division in churches over the issue of slavery. They believed that Christians who held to the fundamental teaching of the death, burial and resurrection of Jesus Christ should fellowship one another, regardless of their views on slavery. They considered anything more to be "political preaching", which they still reject.

The leaders came from Baptist, Presbyterian, and Methodist backgrounds. The church doctrine and polity is a blend of the doctrine and polity of those churches. The ordinances are baptism and the Lord's supper. The Social Brethren reject infant baptism, but allow a candidate to choose between immersion, pouring, or sprinkling. Immersion appears to be used in the majority of cases. Their beliefs include affirmation of the Trinity; that the Bible contains all things necessary to salvation and spiritual life; that salvation is through Jesus alone; the possibility of apostasy; the right of voting and free speech for the laity; and "the impropriety of political preaching".

By 1890, they had grown to 20 churches with 913 members. Currently there are over 1,000 members in 29 congregations. In 1983, there were 26 churches with 1165 members in Illinois, Indiana, and Michigan, as well as eight churches and a mission point in the Philippines. There are three associations that meet annually. The general assembly meets biennially.
