= Evangelical United Brethren Church =

American Protestant group formed in 1946

Official emblem of The Evangelical United Brethren Church

The Evangelical United Brethren Church (EUB) was a North American Protestant denomination from 1946 to 1968 with Arminian theology, roots in the Mennonite and German Reformed communities, and close ties to Methodism. It was formed by the merger of a majority of the congregations of the Evangelical Church founded by Jacob Albright (excluding those that became the Evangelical Church of North America, along with the Evangelical Congregational Church) and the Church of the United Brethren in Christ (New Constitution) (as opposed to the Church of the United Brethren in Christ (Old Constitution), still extant without the parenthetical). The United Brethren and the Evangelical Association had considered merging off and on since the early 19th century because of their common emphasis on holiness and evangelism and their common German heritage.

In 1968, the United States section of the EUB merged with the Methodist Church to form the United Methodist Church, while the Canadian section joined the United Church of Canada.

== History ==
United Brethren in Christ was an American religious denomination which originated in the last part of the 18th century. Though not formally organized until 1800, the roots of the church reach back to 1767. In May of that year, a "Great Meeting" (part of an interdenominational revival movement) was held at a barn belonging to Isaac Long in Lancaster, Pennsylvania, near the village of Oregon. Martin Boehm (1725–1812), a Mennonite preacher, spoke of his becoming a Christian through crying out to God while plowing in the field. Philip William Otterbein (1726–1813), a German Reformed pastor at York, Pennsylvania, (and later of Baltimore), left his seat, embraced Boehm and said to him, "Wir sind Brüder!" (we are brethren!). The followers of Boehm and Otterbein formed a loose movement for many years. It spread to include German-speaking churches supplemented later by English-speaking followers in Pennsylvania, Virginia, Maryland, and later spread west into Ohio.

Pastor Otterbein, returned to Baltimore to the newly organized German Reformed congregation and built a brick Georgian-styled church with a bell tower southwest of Baltimore Town at South Sharp and West Conway Streets, later named Old Otterbein United Methodist Church, which had continued for two centuries in the Brethren denomination before their 1968 merger with the Methodists and is now the oldest active church and building in the city, whose name was also given to the surrounding restored historic neighborhood.

By 1800, they began a yearly conference. Thirteen ministers attended the first conference at the home of Peter Kemp in Frederick, Maryland. At that conference in 1800, they adopted a name, the United Brethren in Christ, and elected Boehm and Otterbein as bishops of the conference. The United Brethren Church claims this organization in 1800 as the first denomination to actually begin in the United States. The first delegated general conference met at Mount Pleasant, Pennsylvania, in 1815, and adopted a confession of faith (similar to one written by Otterbein in 1789), rules of order and a book of discipline, which were revised in 1885–1889, when women were first admitted to ordination.

The ecclesiastical polity of the church was Wesleyan and its theology Arminian. It variously practised believer's baptism or infant baptism. Bishops were elected for four years.

The United Brethren took a strong stand against slavery, beginning around 1820. After 1837, slave owners were no longer allowed to remain as members of the United Brethren Church. The Evangelical United Brethren churches sustained a strong fellowship with Nazarene (believing) Jews. In 1853, the Home, Frontier, and Foreign Missionary Society was organized. Expansion occurred into the western United States, but the church's stance against slavery limited expansion to the south.

By 1889, the United Brethren had grown to over 200,000 members with six bishops. In that same year they experienced a division. Denominational leaders desired to make three changes: to give local conferences proportional representation at the General Conference; to allow laymen to serve as delegates to General Conference; and to allow United Brethren members to hold membership in secret societies such as the Freemasons. The denominational leadership made these changes, but the minority felt the changes violated the constitution because they were not made by the majority vote of all United Brethren members. One of the bishops, Milton Wright (the father of aviation pioneers Wilbur Wright and Orville Wright), disagreed with the actions of the majority. Bishop Wright and other conference delegates left the meeting and resumed the session elsewhere. They believed that the other delegates had violated the constitution (and, in effect, withdrawn from the denomination), and deemed themselves to be the true United Brethren Church. Therefore, the body initially known as the United Brethren in Christ of the Old Constitution, now called the Church of the United Brethren in Christ.

The majority branch had 3,732 organizations in 1906 with a total membership of 274,649. The denomination merged with the Evangelical Church in 1946 to form a new denomination known as the Evangelical United Brethren Church (EUB). This in turn merged in 1968 with The Methodist Church to form the United Methodist Church (UMC). The Evangelical United Brethren who dissented from the merger continued as the Evangelical Church.

== Missionary and educational establishments ==
This body carried on missions in West Africa (since 1855), Japan, China, the Philippines and Puerto Rico. It had a publishing house (1834) and two seminaries Bonebrake Theological Seminary (1871) at Dayton, Ohio, and Evangelical Theological Seminary (1873) in Naperville, IL. The EUB supported several colleges and universities including Otterbein University (1847) at Westerville, Ohio; Plainfield College (now North Central College) (1861) at Naperville, IL; Westfield College (1865) at Westfield, Illinois; Leander Clark College (1857) at Toledo, Iowa; York College (1890) at York, Nebraska; Western Union College (1900), renamed Westmar College (1948) at Le Mars, Iowa; Philomath College (1867) at Philomath, Oregon; Lebanon Valley College (1867) at Annville, Pennsylvania; Campbell College (1864) at Holton, Kansas, and Indiana Central College (later Indiana Central University and now the University of Indianapolis) (1907) at Indianapolis, Indiana. In 1946, with cooperation of three other denominations, it formed the United Andean Indian Mission, an agency that sent missionaries to Ecuador.

== Outside the United States ==
The EUB congregations in Canada joined the United Church of Canada in 1968, the largest Protestant denomination in Canada formed in 1925 by Presbyterians (70% came in), Methodists, and Congregationalists. In the Philippines, the EUB congregations joined the Philippine Methodist Church, Christian Church (Disciples), Presbyterian Church, Congregational Church, Iglesia Evangelica Unida de Cristo, Iglesia Evangelica Nacional and some segments of the Iglesia Evangelica Metodista En Las Islas Filipinas (IEMELIF) to form the United Church of Christ in the Philippines

== See also ==
- Category:Bishops of the Evangelical United Brethren Church
