= Christian Union (denomination) =

U.S. Restorationist Christian denomination

- Classification: Protestant
- Orientation: Methodist; Restorationist; Evangelical
- Polity: Congregationalist
- Associations: National Association of Evangelicals
- Founder: J.F. Given
- Origin: Feb. 3, 1864; Columbus, Ohio
- Separated from: Methodist Episcopal Church, others
- Branched from: Methodist Episcopal Church (North), others
- Separations: Churches of Christ in Christian Union; Illinois District of MEC-South)
- Congregations: 114 (as of 1995)
- Members: 6,000 (1995)
- Official website: christianunion.com

The Christian Union is a Restorationist Christian denomination, with strength in the U.S. state of Ohio and the Midwest.

== Background ==
Strictly congregational, the Christian Union is an attempt to unite all Christians "to promote fellowship among God's people, to put forth every effort to proclaim God's saving grace to the lost ... and to declare the whole counsel of God for the edification of believers."

The Christian Union maintains seven principles: "the oneness of the Church of Christ, Christ as the only head of the church, the Bible as the only rule of faith and practice, good fruits as the one condition of fellowship, Christian union without controversy, complete autonomy for the local church, and avoidance of all partisan political preaching."

Ordinances include baptism by any method, at the choice of the individual, and the Lord's Supper. Inter-church councils meet at various levels for fellowship and to conduct business, plan missions work, etc. Most churches follow a familiar Evangelical, Restorationist pattern with Sunday School, Sunday morning worship services, and mid-week Bible studies.

== History ==
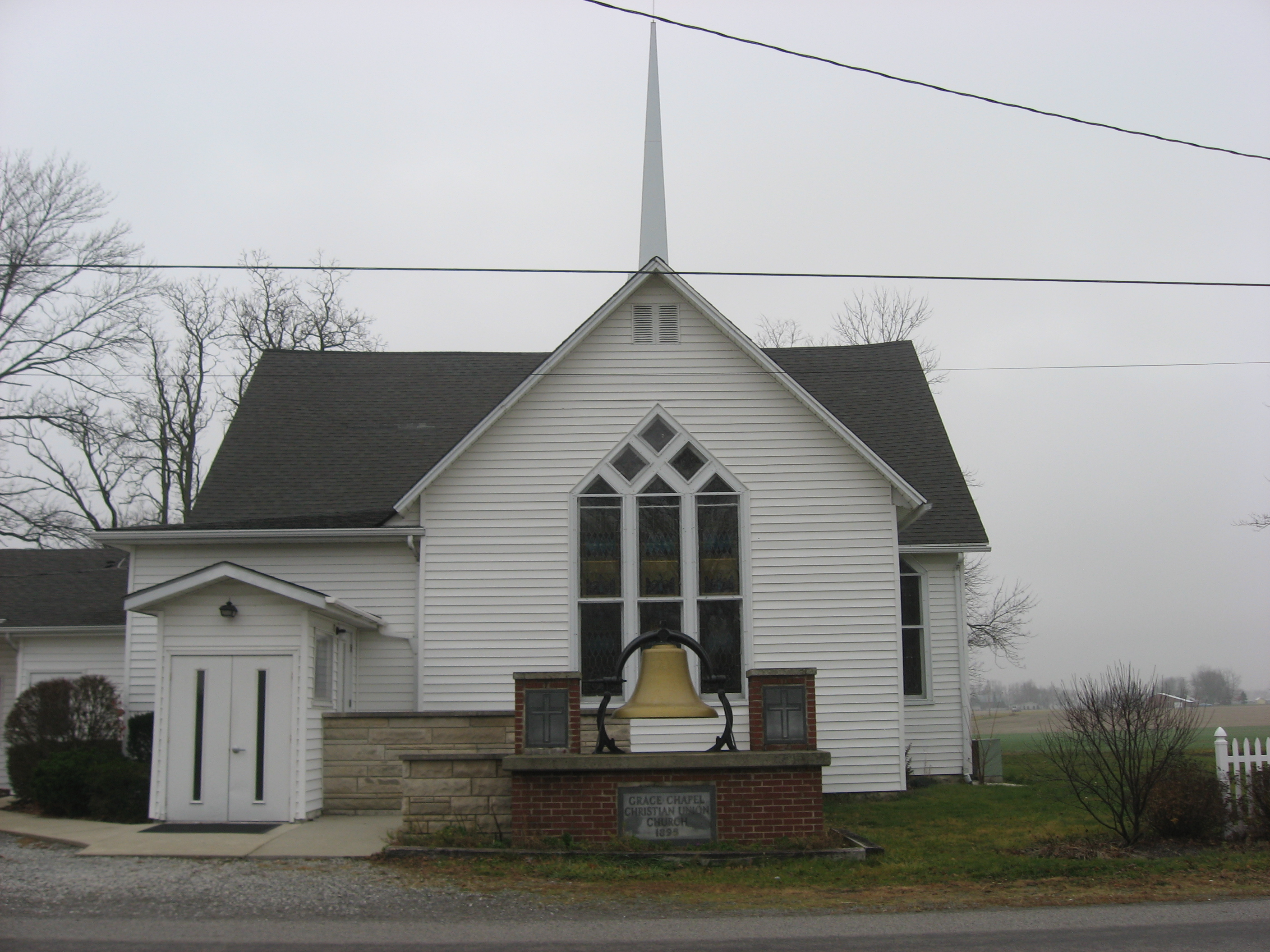
Front of the Grace Chapel Christian Union Church building, Santa Fe, Ohio.

The Christian Union was organized at the Deshler Hotel in Columbus, Ohio, on February 3, 1864 (though groupings of churches that later joined with the Christian Union point to earlier dates and movements as their origin.) Weary of the legion of issues brought to the forefront during the American Civil War, founder Rev. James Fowler Given, a Methodist Episcopal Church (North) pastor, was put out of the itinerant pulpit ministry because he refused to take political stands supported by the denomination, particularly military force in support of abolition.

Given, who quickly became a martyr for Democrats and those opposed to radical Abolitionism, began a newspaper called The Christian Witness "in the interest of pure religion — Christianity free from all superstition, cant and sectarianism; of good Morals; of sound Education and Knowledge; of Genuine Benevolence; of the Great Principles of American Liberty; and, in short, of whatever may subserve a Noble Manhood, or contribute to Public Happiness and Prosperity." Three main reasons underscored the creation of the Christian Union—all promoted within the pages of the Christian Witness. Aside from opposing the political preaching common during the height of the Civil War, founders also objected to the forbidding of laymen to interpret the Bible or freely practice/participate in the Lord's Supper, baptism, and foot washing. Thirdly, the Christian Union founders resented the heavy-handed control of their former denominations—a common objection found in the Restorationism of the time. Their call was to "build the Father's house anew."

Congregations inspired by Given's example were planted as far north as New England and as far south as Florida and west into Texas and Colorado. Given, Dr. John Van Buren Flack of Illinois, G. W. Mitchell, and Dr. Jerry Clevenger provided leadership in the early growth of the denomination, each of whom were Methodists with either "peace Democrat" tendencies or a disdain for ecclesiastical involvement in political affairs. By 1865, the Christian Union reported 180 churches.

By 1870 there were 48 churches, 4,920 members, and 97 preachers in the Christian Union, and in 1898 there were 149 churches, 7,884 members, 105 preachers. By 1906 the membership figure was 13,905 and 13,692 by 1916. Membership statistics dropped sharply in the following years, with 8,791 in 1926 and 6,124 in 1936. In 1995, the denomination reported 114 churches and 6,000 members, with missions work in Africa, Mexico, Liberia and Columbia, as well as the U.S. state of Alaska. Nigeria is home to an associate council of the church, having joined in 1977.

Christian Union operates its School of the Bible, located in Greenfield, Ohio. In 1894, The Christian Union purchased Grand River College, which closed in 1901 due to financial reasons.

A periodical, the Christian Union Witness continues to be published.

== Divisions and mergers ==
There were several attempts at secession in the early history of the Christian Union, many of which were by former Methodists with a goal to introduce a systematic Wesleyan theology and catechism. The largest of these fractures took place within a year of its founding, as the Illinois Christian Union churches voted to join the Methodist Episcopal Church, South, thus becoming the Illinois District of the Southern Methodists.

Another schism, which resulted in the creation of the Churches of Christ in Christian Union denomination, took place in 1909 when a handful of ministers and about 60 lay people left. They claimed ministers holding to a Wesleyan view on sanctification were being censured. The Holiness movement-oriented Churches of Christ in Christian Union reported it drew away 12 preachers, about 1,000 members, and 20 churches from the parent body, and has grown to around 200 churches by 2014.

== See also ==
- Restorationism
