= Philip William Otterbein =

German clergyman (1726–1813)

Philip William Otterbein (June 3, 1726 – November 17, 1813) was an American clergyman. He was the founder of the United Brethren in Christ.

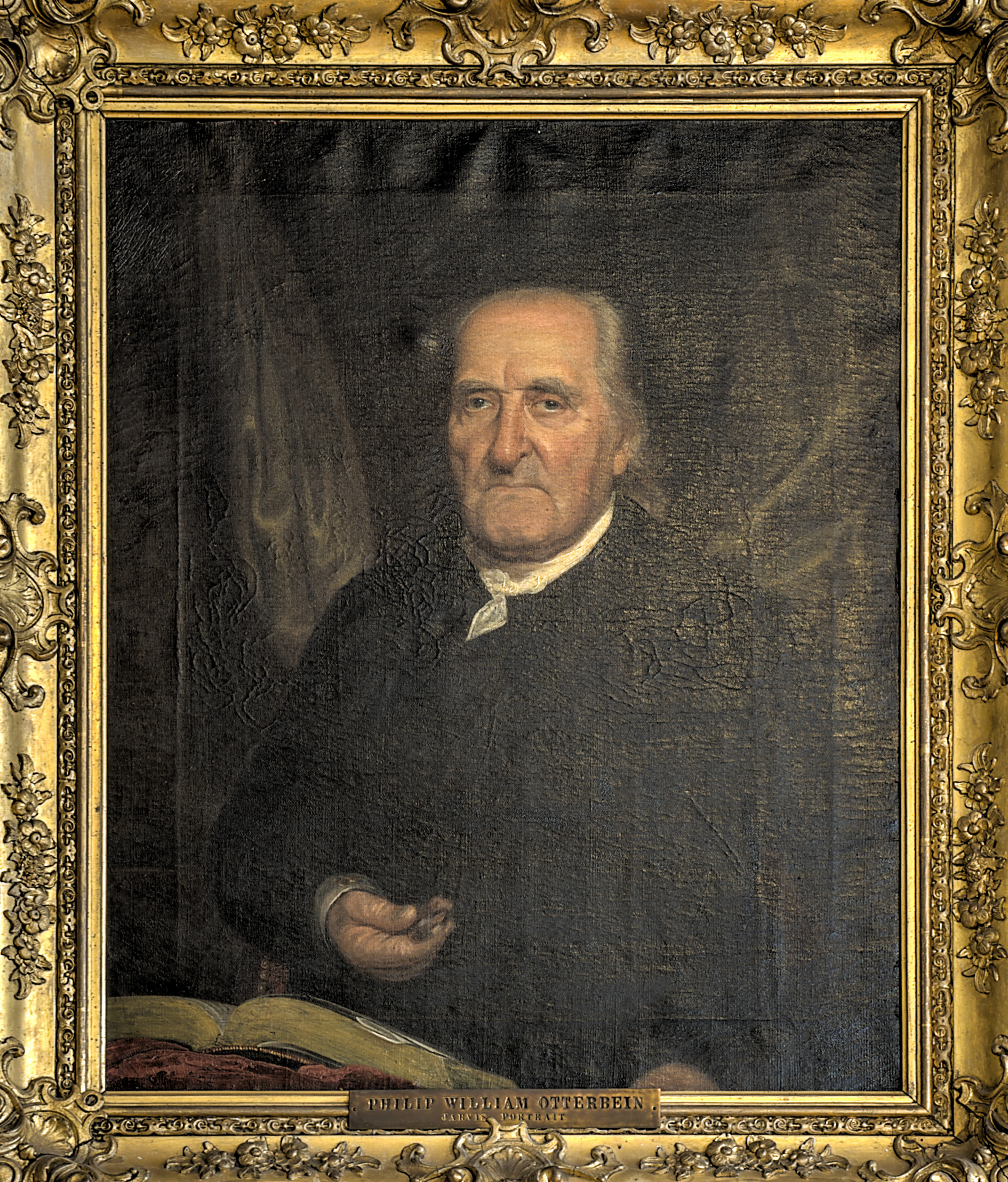
Painting of Otterbein on display at the World Methodist Museum, Lake Junaluska, NC

== Biography ==
Philip William Otterbein was born in Dillenburg, Hesse, Germany, into a family that included many clergy. He attended Herborn Academy and was ordained June 13, 1749. He volunteered for missionary work in Pennsylvania, and arrived in New York on July 27, 1752. He served several German speaking parishes near the Pennsylvania-Maryland border.

In 1767 or 1768, Otterbein, currently serving a Reformed church in Lancaster, Pennsylvania, was present at a worship service in Long's Barn, a nearby barn. Martin Boehm, a Mennonite who had been born in Lancaster, preached, and after the service Otterbein came forward and greeted Boehm with words that became famous in United Brethren tradition: "Wir sind Brüder" (We are brothers). From that day forward they had a close working relationship. Norwood comments that "They were an interesting pair: Otterbein the stately university-trained minister and Boehm the Mennonite farmer with a full beard."

Boehm had been chosen pastor of his local church by lot in 1756. He was a poor speaker until he had an epiphany while praying during plowing. He then became a powerful, effective speaker. He became a Mennonite bishop in 1761, again by lot. Boehm was excommunicated from the Mennonite Church 1775, primarily because of his evangelical activities and associations with Christians of other denominations, formally for other reasons. Boehm continued to be a popular preacher and spoke to large groups in Pennsylvania. Maryland, and Virginia. He also met regularly with Otterbein.

By 1773 Otterbein was organizing religious classes on the Wesleyan model. In 1774 he organized a splinter group from the (German) First Evangelical Reformed Church in Baltimore into the Second Evangelical Reformed Church. He was pastor there from 1774 until his death in 1813. (The building where Otterbein preached is still used for worship, and the congregation is now called Old Otterbein United Methodist Church. It is located in the Otterbein neighborhood of Baltimore next to the Baltimore convention center, and is close to the baseball field Oriole Park at Camden Yards.)

On the day he began pastoral duties in Baltimore, May 4, 1774, he met Methodist lay preacher Francis Asbury, who would be his friend throughout the remainder of his life. Ten years later, Asbury asked Otterbein to be one of four clergy who would lay hands on him when Asbury was ordained (or consecrated) at Lovely Lane Chapel in Baltimore, Maryland as Methodist bishop, December 27, 1784, when the Methodist Episcopal Church was officially organized. Otterbein's church and Lovely Lane Chapel were one-half mile apart.

Officially, Otterbein remained in good standing as a German Reformed clergyman until his death, but his work led inexorably to the formation of a new Protestant denomination, the Church of the United Brethren in Christ. In 1798 Otterbein called a conference of clergy, including Boehm, to be held at Otterbein's Baltimore church. They took the first steps toward organizing the denomination. Two years later, in 1800, another conference took more organizational steps, including the decision to use a German translation of the Methodist Episcopal book of discipline. In their conversations those present used words such as "society," "association," and "fellowship," but not the word "church." They began formally calling themselves a "church" in 1814, after Otterbein's death.

In spite of his reluctance to form a church, the younger men in his movement began conducting themselves as if they were clergy, including administration of sacraments, so seven weeks before his death, Otterbein ordained three of his workers: Christian Newcomer, Joseph Hoffman, and Frederick Schaffer. Newcomer was elected bishop after Otterbein's death.

On April 19, 1762, Otterbein married Susan Le Roy of Lancaster, Pennsylvania. She died a little more than 6 years later on April 22, 1768. He suffered great grief because of his wife's death, and he never married again.

Otterbein passed from this world on Wednesday, November 17, 1813. His funeral took place on Saturday, November 20, 1813; the funeral sermon was delivered in German by Rev. J. D. Kurtz and in English by William Ryland, who would later serve several terms as Chaplain of the Senate. In a memorial sermon in that same year, Asbury called him "the great, the holy Otterbein".

Augustus W. Drury wrote the biography of Otterbein in 1884.

== Legacy ==
Otterbein University in Westerville, Ohio, founded in 1847, is named for Philip William Otterbein.

The majority of the United Brethren in Christ merged with the Evangelical Church in 1946 to form the Evangelical United Brethren Church (though those who dissented from the merger continued the Church of the United Brethren in Christ, which is active to the present day). The Evangelical United Brethren Church merged with the much larger Methodist Church in 1968, forming the United Methodist Church (though those who dissented from the merger organized the Evangelical Church, which is active to the present day).

== See also ==
- List of Methodist Bishops
