= Kalands Brethren =

The Kalands Brethren (Kalandbrüder in German, Fratres Calendarii in Latin) were Catholic religious and charitable associations of priests and laymen. They held regular meetings for religious edification and instruction, and also to encourage works of charity and prayers for the dead.

Especially numerous in Northern and Central Germany, the Kaland confraternities spread to Denmark, Norway, Hungary, and France. They began in the early thirteenth century, flourished in the fourteenth and fifteenth centuries, and were largely abolished in the Reformation.

== History ==
Clergy from different deaneries in Germany traditionally met on the first day of each month (the Calends, hence Kalands). After the thirteenth century, these meetings developed in many cases into special, organized societies to which both priests and the laity, men and women, belonged.

Statutes regulated the conduct of the society, its reunions, the duties of the directors in promoting the religious life and Christian discipline, the services to be held, the administration of funds, and their application to charitable purposes. A dean was the head of each association, and a treasurer administered the revenues. The associations were encouraged by the bishops, who assigned them particular churches or at least special altars. The offering of prayers and masses for deceased members was especially fostered.

The oldest known Kaland confraternity is that of Ottbergen near Höxter (in Westphalia) in 1226. The Kalands flourished in the fourteenth and fifteenth centuries, but later decayed. The Catholic Encyclopedia describes the introduction of a "banquet" at meetings, leading to "revels" and "abuses". In the sixteenth century the Reformation led to the dissolution of the majority; the rest gradually disappeared, only one being now known to exist, that of Münster in Westphalia.
