= Evangelical Association =

Historic Methodist denomination

The Evangelical Church or Evangelical Association, also known in the late 1700s as the New Methodist Conference and in the early 1800s as the Albright Brethren, was a "body of American Christians chiefly of German descent". It was Wesleyan–Arminian in doctrine and theology, as well as Methodist Episcopal in its form of church government.

In 1946, the majority of the congregations of the Evangelical Church merged with the United Brethren in Christ to form the Evangelical United Brethren Church. Those congregations who did not participate in this merger are represented by the Evangelical Church of North America, along with the Evangelical Congregational Church, both of which continue the tradition of the Albright Brethren.

== History ==
The Evangelical Church was founded in 1800 by Jacob Albright (1759–1808), a German-speaking Christian native of the Lancaster, Pennsylvania, area, influenced by John Wesley and the Methodist Episcopal Church and by followers of Philip William Otterbein.

In 1790, several of his children died of dysentery. Although a member of a German Lutheran church, he asked a friend of Otterbein to conduct the funeral. Impressed, he began daily studies with another member of Otterbein's group, which became the Church of the United Brethren in Christ in a few years. He also studied with a member of the Methodist Episcopal Church.

He became a member of a local Methodist study group and became a powerful preacher. The group authorized him as a lay preacher. Feeling that God had called him to ministry, he decided in 1796 to become a traveling preacher, following in the Methodist Episcopal Church pattern, preaching in homes, vacant buildings, and street corners. He wrote, "I began my travels in the year 1776 in the month of October in order to obey the call of God in proclaiming his holy way as revealed in the Gospel."

He began speaking across eastern Pennsylvania, northern Maryland, and Virginia, and organizing small groups. At some point Albright asked Methodist Episcopal Church Bishop Francis Asbury to appoint a German-speaking ordained minister to serve his German-speaking groups with baptisms and communion. Bishop Asbury turned him down.

By 1800 he had three groups with about 20 members, and by 1803 he had five groups with 40.

Albright had never given any indication that he was interested in forming a new organization or church, but in 1803, at the insistence of the leaders of his classes, he called a general meeting of the lay leaders and preachers for November 1803. Besides himself, two preachers and 14 lay leaders attended. The group drew up a license and the two pastors ordained Albright. The group wrote a brief statement of faith.

In 1806, a major revival movement spread throughout eastern Pennsylvania, affecting many religious groups. Albright's followers grew greatly. By 1807, when the newly organized, unnamed church held its first annual conference, the church had 220 members. Here Albright was elected bishop. He also assigned preachers and did what business was needed. The Conference also adopted the episcopal form of government, articles of faith, and a book of discipline. Albright was asked to prepare a Book of Discipline.

Albright died in 1808. A Book of Discipline, based on a German translation of Methodist Episcopal Church Book of Discipline, was introduced six years later.

In 1816, the church took on the name "The Evangelical Association" at its first annual conference. It was not until 1839 that a bishop was elected to replace Albright. John Seybert was elected as part of the young denomination's move towards centralized leadership, and 1843 saw the institution of a general conference, composed of delegates chosen by the annual conferences and constituting the highest legislative and judicial authority in the church.

By 1892, the association numbered 148,506 members, not including children, with 1,864 ministers and 2,043 churches, in the United States, Canada, and Germany.

In 1891, some members of the Evangelical Association left in a controversy over the ownership of the churches to form the United Evangelical Church. Thirty-one years later, in 1923, the two groups reunited under the name "The Evangelical Church".

Those congregations which chose not to re-unite formed the Evangelical Congregational Church which, despite its name, has no historical relation with the Congregational churches derived from New England settlement. Rather, the name refers to its organizational structure, which is based on the local congregation. It continues today.

In 1946, the Evangelical Church merged with the United Brethren in Christ at a meeting in Johnstown, Pennsylvania, to form the Evangelical United Brethren Church. This body, in turn, united with the Methodist Church (USA) in 1968 to form the United Methodist Church. A group of clergy and about fifty local churches withdrew at this time, probably in protest against theological and social liberalism in mainline American Methodism, and formed the Evangelical Church of North America.

== See also ==
- Evangelicalism
