= Evangelical Church (ECNA) =

Protestant church

Evangelical Church of North America
- Classification: Protestant
- Orientation: Evangelical, Holiness
- Polity: Congregational-Connectional
- Associations: Christian Holiness Partnership, National Association of Evangelicals
- Region: U.S. districts, worldwide missions conferences
- Origin: 1968
- Separated from: Evangelical United Brethren Church (EUB)
- Merger of: Holiness Methodist Church (1969), Wesleyan Covenant Church (1975)
- Congregations: 128 (2010)
- Members: 12,475 (2000)
- Official website: https://www.theevangelicalchurch.org/

The Evangelical Church of North America (ECNA) is a Wesleyan-Holiness, Protestant Christian denomination headquartered in Clackamas, Oregon. As of 2000, the Church had 12,475 members in 133 local churches. The Church sponsors missionaries in seven countries.

Its official emblem is composed of a red flame, symbolizing the fire of the Holy Spirit which descended at Pentecost, atop an open Bible. It has published an official magazine, The Evangelical Challenge, and a newsletter, The Heartbeat.

== History ==
The Evangelical Church of North America was officially born June 4, 1968, in Portland, Oregon. But the origin of The Evangelical Church can be traced back to two earlier movements: the Wesleyan awakening in England under John Wesley, the founder of The Methodist Church, and the United Brethren in Christ movement in Pennsylvania, spearheaded by preachers such as William Otterbein and Martin Boehm.

The early Methodists in England and later North America declared that men can be saved from sin, through repentance and faith in Jesus Christ, and that this experience must be followed by a life of dedication and holiness, or "sanctification."

Meanwhile, the work of the United Brethren in Christ grew rapidly after its first Conference was held in York County, Pennsylvania, in 1789. These brethren believed that God is a God of order, and that where there is no order and no church discipline, the spirit of love and charity will be lost. This stream of Protestantism found much in common with the early American Methodists—a relationship that would eventually lead up to the formation of the Evangelical United Brethren Church (EUB) in 1946.

At its annual session in 1967, the Pacific Northwest Conference of the EUB Church voted by a two-thirds majority to secede from its parent body and continue to operate as a separate denomination. The action was taken in anticipation of the EUB's upcoming merger with the Methodist Church (USA). Dissenters differed with an increasingly Modernist trend in American Methodism over Biblical authority, "the social gospel," and the doctrine of Entire Sanctification.

The EUB Book of Discipline (the controlling document of church governance) made no provision for the secession of local congregations or regional conferences, and the denomination did not recognize the validity of the Pacific Northwest Conference's action (or similar votes taken at congregational meetings). The merger between the EUB and The Methodist Church was effected in April 1968, forming the United Methodist Church. This action took title to all assets and properties formerly belonging to the Pacific Northwest Conference, including its local churches and organizations.

On June 4, 1968, in Portland, Oregon, forty-six congregations and about eighty ministers met in a session to organize a separate denomination known as the Evangelical Church of North America (ECNA). Before the end of June 1968, laity and ministers from North Dakota and Montana, representing more than twenty additional congregations, had joined.

In 1969, the Evangelical Church entered into a financial settlement agreement with the Methodists whereby the new denomination gained title to some of the facilities of the former EUB Church, including most of the secessionist congregations' property.

That same year, the Holiness Methodist Church united with the Evangelical Church, bringing along a mission field in Bolivia. In 1975, the Wesleyan Covenant Church, became part of the Evangelical Church, along with its missionary work in Mexico and Brownsville, Texas, and its work among the Navajo Indians in New Mexico. At some point the Evangelical Church in Canada was formed as a conference of the ECNA, but by 1993 it separated and merged into the Evangelical Missionary Church of Canada (EMCC).

A mention was made at the 2006 General Conference of the Evangelical Methodist Church (EMC) of talks of a possible merger with the ECNA. By 2014, the denominations were sharing a common ministry training school.

== Theology ==
The Evangelical Church is strongly Wesleyan-Arminian, emphasizing free will over determinism and salvation through a two separate and instantaneous acts of Grace, justification and sanctification, attained through Faith resulting in repentance. This, together with Biblical inerrancy and belief in a direct command of God to universally evangelize, are common to the various bodies which comprise the Holiness movement. The Church has an official Statement of Faith, which is based on that of the Methodism inherited from the EUB, but which has been revised to make these emphases of doctrine more specific and Evangelical.

== Governance ==
The polity of the Evangelical Church can be described as congregational-connectional. Like other denominations in the Methodist tradition, the principal governing body of the Evangelical Church is a general conference, with delegates from each of six regional conferences. The regional conferences meet annually with delegates from each of the local congregations within their respective territories. The Church does not have bishops, but is led by Conference Superintendents and a General Superintendent, who are elected to fixed terms, and who all have pastoral and administrative responsibilities.

== Affiliations ==
The Evangelical Church is a member of the Christian Holiness Association and the National Association of Evangelicals. The Evangelical Church is a missionary oriented church averaging at least one adult missionary per local church. The three major organizations supported, beyond the Evangelical Church Missions department, are OMS International, World Gospel Mission and Wycliffe Bible Translators. In addition, Evangelical Church members serve through a score of other interdenominational missions organizations.

== See also ==
- Evangelical Association
- Evangelical Methodist Church
- Evangelical United Brethren
- Methodism
- United Brethren in Christ
- United Methodist Church
