= Church of the United Brethren in Christ =

Evangelical Christian denomination

- Classification: Protestant
- Orientation: Evangelical
- Theology: Anabaptism, Wesleyan-Arminian, Pietist
- Polity: Episcopal
- Headquarters: Huntington, IN
- Founder: Martin Boehm; Philip William Otterbein
- Origin: 1800
- Separated from: Church of the United Brethren in Christ (New Constitution)
- Tertiary institutions: Huntington University

The Church of the United Brethren in Christ is an evangelical Christian denomination with churches in 17 countries. It is Protestant, with an episcopal structure and Arminian theology, with roots in the Mennonite and German Reformed communities of 18th-century Pennsylvania, as well as close ties to Methodism. It was organized in 1800 by Martin Boehm and Philip William Otterbein and is the first American denomination that was not transplanted from Europe. It emerged from United Brethren churches that were at first unorganized, not all of which joined the new denomination when it was formally organized in 1800, following a 1789 conference at the Otterbein Church in Baltimore, Maryland)

In 1889, a controversy over membership in secret societies such as the Freemasons, the proper way to modify the church's constitution, and other issues split the United Brethren into majority liberal and minority conservative blocs, the latter of which was led by Bishop Milton Wright (father of the Wright Brothers). Both groups continued to use the name Church of the United Brethren in Christ.

The majority faction, known as the Church of the United Brethren in Christ (New Constitution), merged with the Evangelical Church in 1946 to form a new denomination known as the Evangelical United Brethren Church (EUB). This in turn merged in 1968 with the Methodist Church to form the United Methodist Church (UMC).

The Wright-led faction was known as the Church of the United Brethren in Christ, Old Constitution until 1946, when it resumed usage of the original name. As of 2025, the denomination claims about 600 congregations, with 47,300 members in fifteen countries. The US National Conference consists of about 200 churches and 25,000 members in the United States, plus mission districts in Haiti and India. The United States national office is located in Huntington, Indiana, as is the denomination's only college, Huntington University.

== History ==
Martin Boehm

Though the church was not organized until 1800, its roots reach back to 1767. In May of that year, a "Great Meeting" (part of the interdenominational revival movement the First Great Awakening) was held at a barn belonging to Isaac Long in Lancaster, Pennsylvania. Martin Boehm (1725–1812), a Mennonite preacher, spoke of his becoming a Christian through crying out to God while plowing in the field. Philip William Otterbein (1726–1813), a Reformed pastor at York, Pennsylvania, left his seat, embraced Boehm and said to him, "Wir sind Brüder" (We are brethren).

The followers of Boehm and Otterbein formed a loose movement for many years. It spread to include German-speaking churches in Pennsylvania, Virginia, Maryland, and Ohio. In 1800, they began a yearly conference. Thirteen ministers attended the first conference at the home of Peter Kemp in Frederick, Maryland. At that conference in 1800, they adopted a name, the United Brethren in Christ. Boehm and Otterbein, now in their 70s, were elected as bishops. The United Brethren Church claims to be the first denomination to actually begin in the United States, rather than be transplanted from Europe. A confession of faith was adopted in 1815 (similar to one written by Otterbein in 1789), and it has remained the statement of church doctrine to the present. In 1841, they adopted a constitution. It has remained mostly intact, being changed perhaps a dozen times.

William Otterbein retained a connection with the Reformed Church, pastoring a Reformed Church in Baltimore, Maryland, from 1774 until his death in 1813. Martin Boehm was excluded by the Mennonites in 1775. He joined the Methodist Church in 1802, while remaining bishop of the United Brethren until his death in 1812. Francis Asbury, bishop of the Methodist Church in America, spoke at the memorial services of both of these United Brethren bishops. Otterbein had assisted in Asbury's ordination.

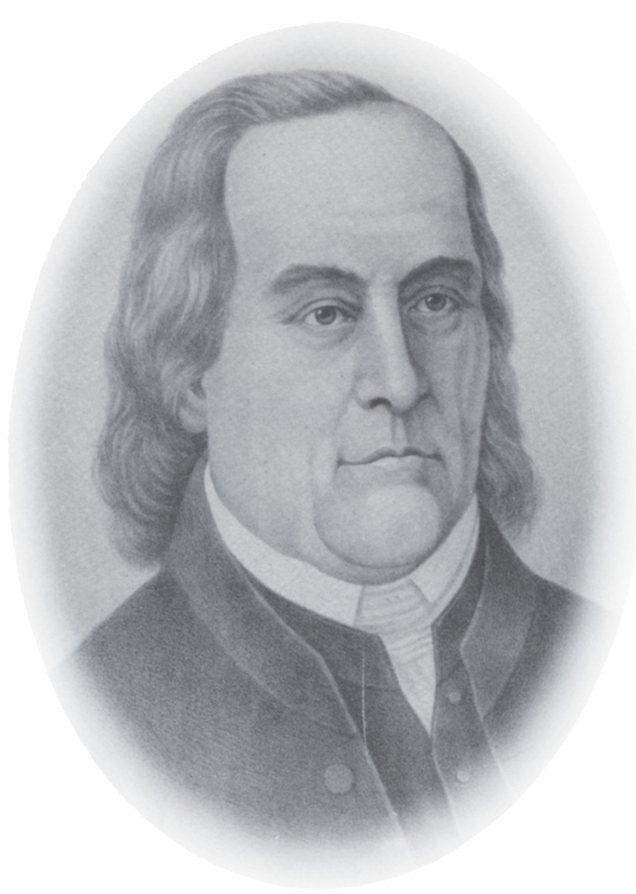
Philip William Otterbein

The United Brethren took a strong stand against slavery in 1821. After 1837, slave owners were no longer allowed to remain as members of the United Brethren Church. In 1847, the United Brethren founded Otterbein University in Westerville, Ohio, which continues today. In 1853, the Home, Frontier, and Foreign Missionary Society was organized. Expansion occurred into the western United States, but the church's stance against slavery limited expansion to the south.

=== Church of the United Brethren in Christ (Old Constitution) ===
By 1889, the United Brethren had grown to over 200,000 members with six bishops. That same year they experienced a division. Denominational leaders wanted to make three changes: to give local conferences proportional representation at the General Conference; to allow laymen to serve as delegates to the General Conference; and to allow United Brethren members to hold membership in secret societies. However, the consensus process for amending the constitution at the time made it difficult to amend; amendments required a 2/3 majority of all church members. However, the delegates believed these changes were necessary for the good of the church and enacted them without this near consensus at the 1889 General Conference, held in York, Pennsylvania. They also adopted a new confession of faith.

A minority, mostly conservative. faction felt the changes violated the constitution because they were not made by a 2/3 majority of all church members. Milton Wright (the father of aviation pioneers Wilbur Wright and Orville Wright) was the only one of the church's six bishops to side with the minority. He and 13 other conference delegates left the meeting and resumed the session at the York Opera House. They argued that, based on the requirements in the church constitution, the majority faction had effectively withdrawn from the denomination, and they declared themselves to be the true United Brethren Church.

Most of the congregations that sided with Wright lost their property. Wright led this group— comprising 10,000 to 15,000 constituents—in those early years as they reorganized. A new headquarters began taking shape in 1897 in Huntington, Indiana, with the establishment of a publishing house, national offices, and Huntington College. Wright served as bishop until 1905.

Until 1946 both groups operated under the name Church of the United Brethren in Christ, distinguished by whether they were the Church of the United Brethren in Christ (Old Constitution), known as the "Radicals", or the Church of the United Brethren in Christ (New Constitution), known as the "Liberals". Both claimed 1800 as their founding date, with heritage dating to 1767, and the same history up to 1889.

In 1946, the larger New Constitution United Brethren church merged with the Evangelical Association to form the Evangelical United Brethren Church. That body in turn merged with the Methodist Church (USA) in 1968 to form the United Methodist Church. The present United Brethren Church is descended from the Old Constitution faction. This group eventually adopted two of the changes that had led to the division of 1889 – local conferences have proportional representation at General Conference, and half of the delegates are laypersons. The present church contends that unlike in 1889, these changes were adopted constitutionally, by near consensus.

== Theology ==
The Church of the United Brethren in Christ is a conservative Trinitarian body of Christians that profess the deity, humanity, and atonement of Jesus; that the Bible, both the Old and New Testaments, is the inspired Word of God; and that salvation is through faith, repentance, and following after Christ. The church holds two ordinances: baptism and the Lord's supper. The church takes a neutral position on the observance of foot washing, stating, "the example of washing feet is left to the judgment of every one to practice or not...".

== Branches and connections ==
At first the Church of the United Brethren in Christ was loosely organized and known simply as the United Brethren Church. When it officially organized into a denomination in 1800, it adopted the name "Church of the United Brethren in Christ" to avoid confusion with the Unitas Fratrum (Unity of the Brethren), or, as it more commonly was called in English, the United Brethren (also known as the Moravian Church). Although there was influence by Pietism and the Moravians on the founders of the Church of the United Brethren in Christ, there is no direct organizational link.

Likewise, there are no organizational connections with the Brethren denominations coming out of the German Brethren and Swiss Brethren movements, and there are no connections with various Latter Day Saint groups that use "United Brethren" in their name.

=== Brethren in Christ ===
Known branches of the Church of the United Brethren in Christ include several congregations that had been led by United Brethren founder Martin Boehm. Initially known as River Brethren, they developed into several denominations, including the Brethren in Christ Church, Calvary Holiness Church, Old Order River Brethren/Yorker Brethren, and United Zion Church. While they were associated with the United Brethren during the early decades, they never joined when the movement formalized into a denomination.

=== Missionary Church ===
During the 19th century, John Swank and a small number of supporters left the United Brethren Church. They joined with a small faction that had broken from the larger Brethren in Christ Church. Led by John Wegner, this group was also known by the name "Brethren in Christ". Part of this group, led by John Swank, later broke off and merged to become part of the Mennonite Brethren in Christ. The Mennonite Brethren in Christ eventually contributed to the convergence of denominations of what is now the Missionary Church, USA, headquartered in Fort Wayne, Indiana. The remainder of the Wegner/Swank Brethren in Christ became the Pentecostal Brethren in Christ before becoming part of the Pilgrim Holiness Church, which merged to become part of the Wesleyan Church.

=== United Christian Church ===
In addition a small group of members withdrew (primarily over a desire for a stronger stand on pacifism) to form one of the denominations known as the United Christian Church around the middle of the 19th century.

=== Christian Union / Churches of Christ in Christian Union Church ===
In 1848, a small group withdrew to form the Republican United Brethren Church. They later merged with another small splinter group, called the Reformed United Brethren Church to create the Evangelical United Brethren Association. The Evangelical United Brethren Association is believed to have united with several other groups to form the Christian Union in 1864. In 1909, the Christian Union split into the Christian Union and the Churches of Christ in Christian Union.

The Evangelical United Brethren Association was not related to the Evangelical Association that later was known as the Evangelical Church and later merged to become The Evangelical United Brethren Church.

=== United Methodist Church and United Church of Canada ===
The largest branching came in 1889, when the main body divided into two groups. The larger group embraced a new constitution while the smaller group retained the original constitution. The larger group was known as the Church of the United Brethren in Christ or, later, the United Brethren Church (UB). In 1946, the United Brethren Church merged with the Evangelical Church to form the Evangelical United Brethren Church (EUB). In 1968 the Evangelical United Brethren Church merged with the Methodist Church to form the United Methodist Church (UMC).

In Canada, the more liberal United Brethren group resulting from the1889 split joined with the Congregationalists in 1906. The Congregationalists then joined with the Methodist Church and most of the Presbyterian Churches in Canada in 1925 to form the United Church of Canada. The more conservative United Brethren Church after 1889 continues to this day as the United Brethren Church in Canada. When EUB churches in the United States entered the UMC in 1968, congregations in Central Canada merged with the United Church of Canada.

=== Evangelical Church of North America and Evangelical Missionary Church of Canada ===
In 1968, a number of the Evangelical United Brethren Churches in the US and Canada left the Evangelical United Brethren Church/United Methodist Church. Some rejoined the Church of the United Brethren in Christ and, other denominations or remained independent. Most organized the Evangelical Church of North America. Later, because of international laws and legal requirements by Revenue Canada, the Canadian branch of the Evangelical Church of North America withdrew to form its own denomination. The Evangelical Church in Canada then merged with the Missionary Church of Canada to form the Evangelical Missionary Church in Canada. Fraternal ties between the Evangelical Church and the Evangelical Missionary Church have been maintained.

=== Association of Evangelical Churches ===
In 1981, a group of former Evangelical United Brethren churches in Pennsylvania separated from the Evangelical Church of North America over concerns regarding the ownership of congregational property. They established the Association of Evangelical Churches. The Association began an annual slate of ministry events with a family camp in August 1982, and has since added a nen's retreat, ninisters' retreat, youth retreat, and ladies retreat. In addition, its Board of Ministry trains, licenses, and ordains workers for ministry. The Association was a member of the Christian Holiness Partnership. Four chairmen have served the Association since its inception: Rev. Evans Mitchell, 1982–1986; Rev. Gary Lyons, 1986–1998; Rev. James Nelson, 1998–2006; and Rev. Allen Young, since 2006.

=== United Believers in Christ ===
All but one of the churches of California Conference of the Church of the United Brethren in Christ, USA, withdrew from the denomination during the fall of 2005 and started their own group, called United Believers in Christ. The denomination had just gone through a two-year effort to merge into the Missionary Church USA denomination. Although the California churches had strongly supported the initiatives of UBHope, a group that opposed joining with the Missionary Church, USA, and although many of the ideas ultimately adopted originated from UBHope, the California churches continued to disagree with the direction of the Church of the United Brethren in Christ, USA.

=== Church of the United Brethren in Christ (Old Constitution) ===
The smaller group of churches resulting from the 1889 division became known as the Church of the United Brethren in Christ (Old Constitution). Later, after the other Church of the United Brethren in Christ (New Constitution) changed names with its 1946 merger with the Evangelical Church, "Old Constitution" was dropped from the name. Today, they are often informally referred to as United Brethren (UB) or the United Brethren Church (UBC).

== Church of the United Brethren in Christ, International ==
The official logo of the Church of the United Brethren in Christ, International

In the late 1980s through the early 21st century, a need to comply with changing international laws resulted in the creation of a number of self-governing United Brethren national conferences, organized by country. These independent national denominations covenanted together to create an interdependent body called the Church of the United Brethren in Christ, International. They must all agree to follow the Confession of Faith of 1815, as well as a set of seven Core Values adopted in 2001. The other international governing documents include a constitution and by-Laws.

The General Conference of the Church of the United Brethren in Christ, International, meets every three years. It is the highest governing body of the church, and is composed of representatives from the ten national conferences. Each national conference can send two delegates, usually its Bishop or General Superintendent and its Missions Director. The national conference of each country elects its own highest official (often called the bishop). These national conference officials make up an international Executive Committee. The executive committee meets annually, usually electronically, to take care of business between sessions of the General Conference. Canadian Bishop Brian Magnus is the current chair of the United Brethren International Executive Committee.

=== National conferences ===
The Church of the United Brethren in Christ, International, currently consists of ten self-governing national conferences. Seven of them existed when the international structure was adopted in 2001. Two more conferences, Mexico and the Philippines, were accepted as part of the denomination in 2005, and the UB churches in Guatemala became the tenth national conference in 2010. The Philippines National Conference was removed from membership by the 2017 General Conference. A group of nearly 30 churches in Haiti that had affiliated with the United Brethren in 2000 as a mission district and had operated under the supervision of the Canadian national conference, organized as a national conference in 2019. The ten national conferences are:

- The United Brethren Church in Canada
- The Church of the United Brethren in Christ, Honduras
- The Church of the United Brethren in Christ, Hong Kong
- The Church of the United Brethren in Christ, Jamaica
- The Church of the United Brethren in Christ, Mexico
- The Church of the United Brethren in Christ, Nicaragua
- The Church of the United Brethren in Christ, Sierra Leone
- The Church of the United Brethren in Christ, USA
- The Church of the United Brethren in Christ, Guatemala
- The Church of the United Brethren in Christ, Haiti

=== Mission districts ===
In addition there are various mission districts. A mission district is a collection of churches in a country which are not yet organized into a national conference. Instead, those churches are under the supervision of a national conference. For example, UB Global, the joint mission organization of the United Brethren churches in the United States and Canada, currently oversees a mission district in India and the two churches in Macau, while the Hong Kong Conference oversees the work in Thailand. Any mission district can seek status as a national conference if it meets and maintains the following criteria:

1. It consists of at least five churches within that country.
2. It is a legally recognized entity within that country.
3. No other United Brethren national conference exists in that country.
4. It is organized with a constitution and other governing documents.
5. Its governing documents, teachings, and practices do not conflict with the Confession of Faith, Core Values, Constitution, and Bylaws of the Church of the United Brethren in Christ, International.

If a mission district meets those requirements, it can apply for national conference status through this procedure:

1. The churches in the mission district vote to seek membership in the Church of the United Brethren in Christ, International.
2. They develop their governing documents and submit them to the international Executive Committee for review.
3. The General Conference approves, by a two-thirds vote, the request for membership.

These are the current mission districts:

- Costa Rica (oversight by Nicaragua)
- El Salvador (oversight by Honduras)
- Germany (oversight by Sierra Leone)
- India (oversight by UB Global [USA])
- Macau (oversight by UB Global [USA])
- Thailand (oversight by Hong Kong)
- Liberia (oversight by Sierra Leone)
- France (oversight by UB Global [USA]))

(see also: other Protestant missionary societies in China during the 19th century)

== Church of the United Brethren in Christ, USA ==
=== Organization ===
The Church of the United Brethren in Christ, USA is the United Brethren national conference for the United States. Its national offices are located in Huntington, Indiana. Led by an elected bishop, it is composed of clergy and lay representatives from US congregations and US-sponsored mission fields. The national conference meets every two years.

On October 14, 2003, the Executive Leadership Team of the United Brethren Church, USA voted to pursue joining with the Missionary Church. The joining was tentatively scheduled to occur in 2005 but was defeated by a vote of the membership in 2004. This action, had it received a favorable vote, would have combined the United Brethren churches in the United States into the Missionary Church USA, so that all of those congregations would have become Missionary Church congregations.

At the 2005 national conference, significant changes were passed that initiated a major restructuring and refocusing of the denomination. The new organizational structure eliminated the multiple geographical annual conferences that had existed since 1810, and replaced them with smaller groupings called clusters consisting of 5 to 10 churches and their senior pastors. Clusters were designed to better equip congregations and their leadership while building stronger relationships and accountability.

The new structure did the following:

- Moved the National Conference from a four-year cycle to a two-year cycle.
- Required each United Brethren church in the United States to affirm its continued support for a covenant agreement. The covenant agreement lays out the minimum expectations to be a United Brethren church.
- Required that all pastors and their congregations work together with other pastors and congregations in groups of 5-10 churches called "clusters." The new structure allowed flexibility in the formation and focus of a cluster. Each cluster receives ongoing training to equip the pastors in the cluster to equip their churches. All cluster leaders are appointed by the United States bishop.
- Allowed for a variety of mission-focused networks and associations to be created. These groups could revolve around world evangelism, camps, church planting, or any number of other affinities.
- Required a "partnership fee" of 3.5% of a church's income. Before 2005, most churches paid around 12% of their income toward conference and denominational interests. The elimination of the annual conferences, a mid-level geographic entity with its own leaders and programs, enabled the fee to be drastically reduced and thereby keep more finances at the local church level.

The covenant must be signed by each church and reciprocally signed by the bishop. If a church decides not to sign the covenant, they are basically withdrawing from the denomination. The covenant, as most recently revised, includes these points:

1. We commit to the Confession of Faith and Core Values of the Church of the United Brethren in Christ, International.
2. We agree to abide by the Constitution and Discipline of the US National Conference.
3. We will prioritize our assets, energies, and ministries toward fulfilling the Great Commission.
4. We will support the broader ministry and mission of the Church of the United Brethren in Christ, USA, through prayer, promotion of its interests, and the annual partnership fee.

=== Affiliated ministries ===
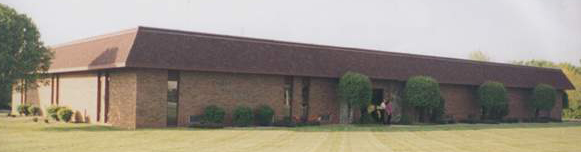
The United Brethren National Office in Huntington, Indiana, in 1998

- UB Global (formerly Global Ministries), located in Huntington, Indiana, is the official agency of the Church of the United Brethren Church, USA, for worldwide evangelism and discipleship. Areas of responsibility include overseeing mission conferences, certifying missionaries, and promoting connections between US and non-US congregations. The United States and Canadian national conferences work together under a joint ministry agreement; two representatives from the Canadian church serve on the UB Global Leadership Team.
- Huntington University is owned and operated by the Church of the United Brethren in Christ, USA. The successor of Hartsville Seminary, Huntington University was founded in 1897 as Central College. In 1917, the name was changed to Huntington College, and it became Huntington University on July 1, 2005.
- Laurel Mission is a holistic ministry meeting physical, social, and spiritual needs in rural Kentucky.
- Rhodes Grove Camp is a campground located near Chambersburg, Pennsylvania. It was the campground of the Mid-Atlantic Conference until 2005, at which time Rhodes Grove became an independent entity with its own board of directors. The camp's strong connections with United Brethren churches continue.
- Camp Living Waters is a United Brethren campground in Luther, Michigan. In 2005, Camp Living Waters became an independent entity, while retaining strong connections with the founding United Brethren churches.
- Camp Cotubic, located in Bellefontaine, Ohio, was the campground of the former Central Conference of the US National Conference. It became an independent entity, with its own board of directors, in 2006, though the historic connections with United Brethren churches in Ohio and Indiana continue.

=== Key national leader ===
- Rev. Todd Fetters, Bishop

=== Publications ===
- Worldview is the official publication of UB Global and is published quarterly.

== Status ==
The total number of United Brethren churches is 600, with a membership of 47,300. In 2017, membership in the United States was around 20,000 in 180 congregations. The majority of United Brethren churches are located in Pennsylvania, Ohio, Indiana, and Michigan. Outside the United States, there are churches in Canada, Costa Rica, El Salvador, Guatemala, Haiti, Honduras, Hong Kong, India, Jamaica, Liberia, Macau, Mexico, Nicaragua, Sierra Leone, France, and Thailand.

== Higher education ==
Since its beginning in the 18th century, the Church of the United Brethren in Christ has founded 34 colleges, seminaries, and academies in the United States. Only Huntington University is part of the current Church of the United Brethren in Christ. The complete list of colleges surviving as independent entities include:

- Huntington University, Huntington, Indiana (UBC)
- Lebanon Valley College, Annville, Pennsylvania (associated with the UMC)
- Otterbein University Westerville, Ohio (UMC)
- United Theological Seminary, Dayton, Ohio (UMC)
- University of Indianapolis, Indianapolis, Indiana (UMC)
- Shenandoah University, Winchester, Virginia (UMC)

== Notable people ==
- Clarence E. Coe, pioneer of Palms, California, and member of the Los Angeles City Council, 1931–1933
- James M. Cox, 1920 Democratic presidential candidate, twice governor of Ohio, and founder of Cox Enterprises
- Francis Scott Key, writer of "The Star-Spangled Banner" and a Sunday school teacher for the United Brethren
- Benjamin Hanby, a United Brethren bishop's son who wrote the songs "Darling Nelly Gray", "Up on the Housetop", and "Jolly Old St. Nicholas"
- Lillian Resler Keister Harford (1851–1935), church organizer and editor
- Orville D. Merillat, founder of Merillat Industries, a noted philanthropist, and a United Brethren member
- J. Edward Roush, U.S. Representative from Indiana's 4th Congressional District (1959–1977) who was instrumental in establishing the nationwide 911 emergency system
- Orville and Wilbur Wright, inventors of the airplane, who were sons of United Brethren bishop Milton Wright
