= Martin Boehm =

American bishop (1725–1812)

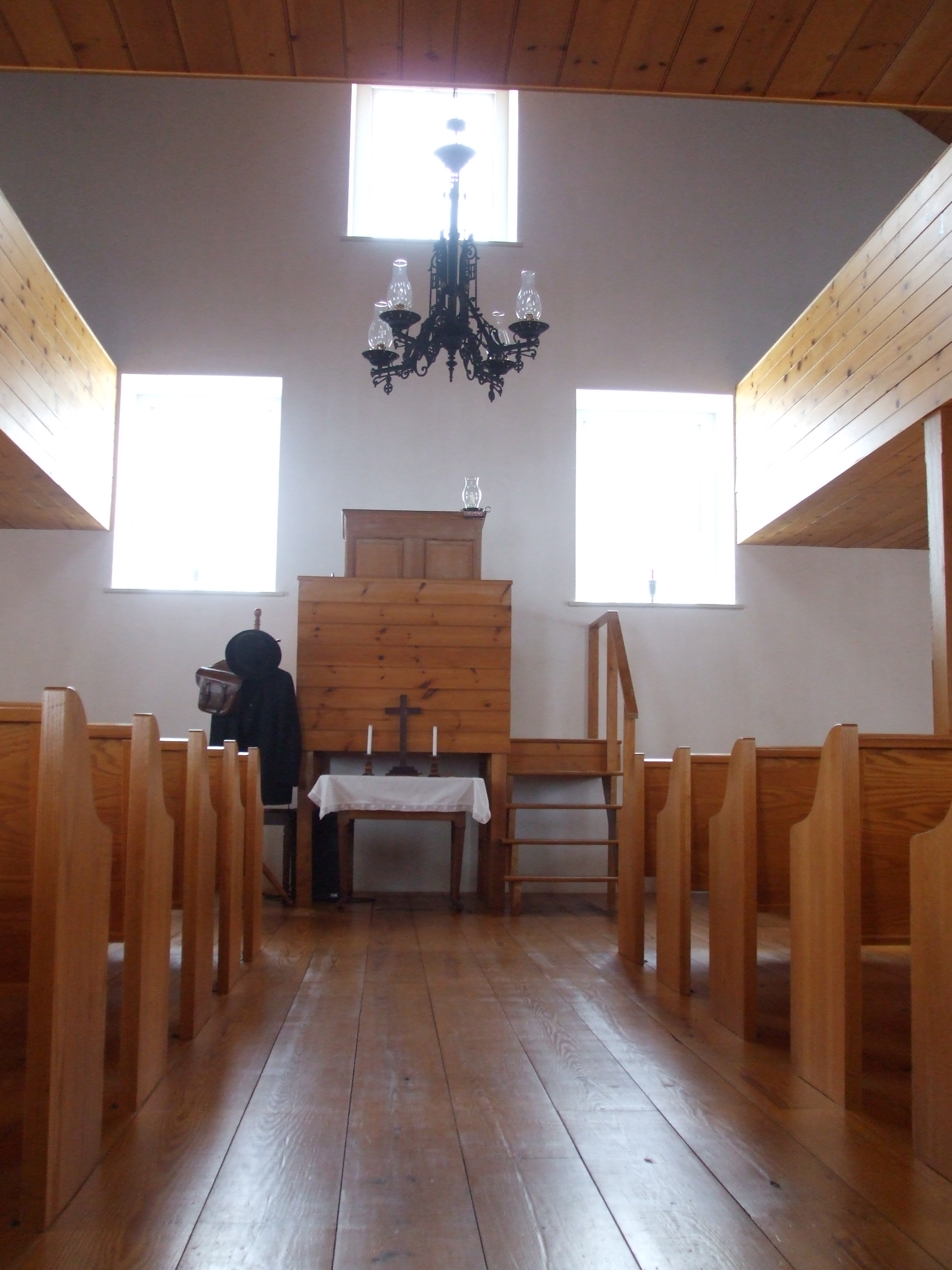
The restored interior of Boehm's Chapel

Martin Boehm (November 30, 1725 – March 23, 1812) was an American clergyman and pastor. He was the son of Jacob Boehm and Barbara Kendig who settled in Lancaster, Pennsylvania. Boehm married Eve Steiner in 1753 and in 1756 he was chosen by lot to become the minister of the local German-speaking Mennonite church.

Although raised a Mennonite, he lacked the assurance of the presence and power of Jesus Christ in his life and he prayed for a heart-warming experience, to deepen his personal faith. Then one day, after many months of prayer and meditation he had an epiphany. After this, Martin preached with confidence and fervor. In 1761, Martin was advanced to the office of bishop in the Mennonite tradition.

On May 10, 1767, in a Great Meeting held at Long's Barn near Lancaster, Pa., Boehm met Philip William Otterbein, an ordained missionary to German speaking residents in America for the Reformed Church in Germany. Otterbein was so impressed with Boehm's passionate message that afterwards he embraced Boehm and declared, "Wir sind Brüder" (We are brethren). From that moment, the two were lifelong friends and companions.

In 1774, Boehm opened his home to a Methodist group that needed a place to meet. Soon the members of his family became Methodists, while he remained a Mennonite.

Boehm's Chapel

In 1791 Boehm donated land six miles south of Lancaster to that Methodist group to build religious buildings. That same year a church was built and named Boehm's Chapel.

In 1774, Otterbein helped a splinter group from a Reformed Evangelical church in Baltimore become the Second Reformed Evangelical Church and, with Boehm’s encouragement, he became its pastor.

Both men continued their outreach to others and both were strongly influenced by Methodist beliefs. They had a number of followers.

In 1800, after being expelled by the Mennonites for being too evangelical, Boehm and Otterbein formed the Church of the United Brethren in Christ, and they were elected the denomination's first two bishops.

In 1802, Boehm joined the Methodist Episcopal Church while still a bishop of the United Brethren Church, becoming a bishop there too.

He is believed to be a descendant of Jakob Boehme. His youngest child of eight children, Henry Boehm, also became a clergyman.

Martin Boehm died on March 23, 1812. Methodist Episcopal Church Bishop Francis Asbury and Boehn's son Henry Boehm, a Methodist pastor, conducted a memorial service for Boehm on April 5, 1812.

== Restoration to Bishop Emeritus ==
On February 26, 2016, the bishops of the Lancaster Mennonite Conference unanimously approved a resolution to "grant a remission of the censure of excommunication to Martin Boehm and a restoration of his bishop creditial, emeritus." The resolution was presented, and a written confession signed, by three Mennonite bishops at the 225th anniversary of Boehm's Chapel on June 26, 2016, to a crowd of more than 250 witnesses.

== See also ==
- List of bishops of the United Methodist Church
