= Paducah District of The United Methodist Church =

The Purchase District of The United Methodist Church is one of the 4 Districts of the Memphis Conference of The United Methodist Church. It consists of eight County Clusters and 79 churches/56 pastoral charges in the Jackson Purchase area of western Kentucky. The Reverend Sky McCracken is the District Superintendent, and Bishop William T. McAlilly is the Resident Bishop.

== Historical significance ==
- Many of the churches in the Purchase District, formerly the Paducah District, were among the earliest institutions in the Jackson Purchase Area of Western Kentucky, and have been in continuous operation since between 1824 and 1834.
  - Many of the Purchase District churches maintain adjacent cemeteries.
  - The historical records of these churches and of their cemeteries provide invaluable research opportunities for genealogical and community studies.
  - The annual Charge Conference records of each church are archived and maintained by the District Office in Brewers, KY. These records contain information about land transactions and other property holdings, finances, clergy and lay leadership, and other invaluable items of historical significance for community and genealogical research.
- The Memphis Conference Archives contain copies of annual Charge Conference records for churches throughout the conference area, including the Purchase District, including the earliest circuits, preachers, lay members and officers, land records, and many other items of interest that in many cases have been lost in fires, storms and other disasters by local churches and county court houses.
