= James Dempster =

James Dempster may refer to:

- James Dempster (Methodist), Methodist clergyman
- James Dempster (footballer), Scottish footballer

== See also ==
- Jim Dempster, Mozambican-born British surgeon and researcher
