= Beverly Waugh =

American Methodist pastor and book agent

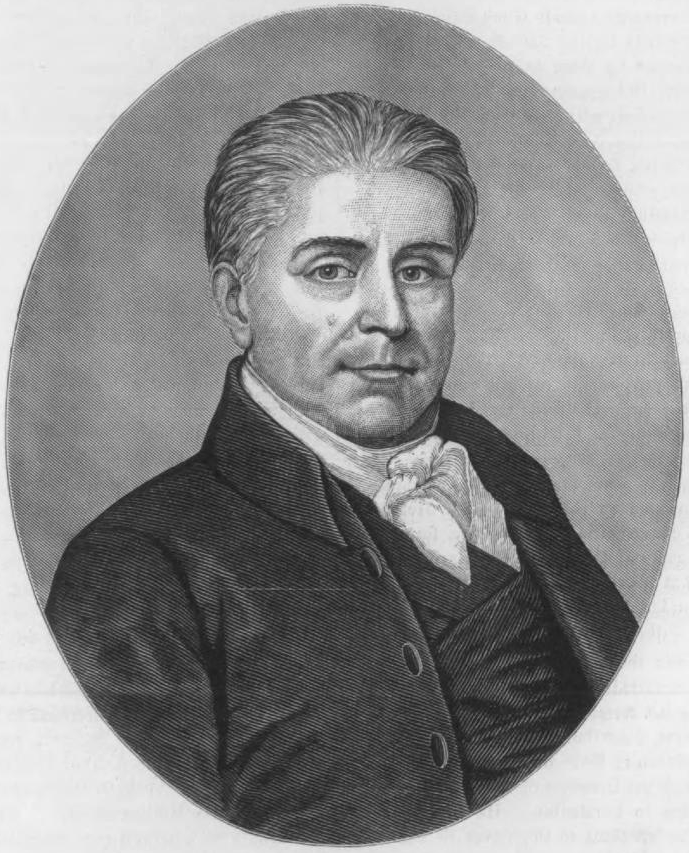
- Born: October 28, 1789; Fairfax County, Virginia
- Died: February 9, 1858 (aged 68); Baltimore, Maryland
- Burial place: Mount Olivet Cemetery
- Occupations: Clergyman, book agent

Beverly Waugh (1789–1858) was an American who was a Methodist pastor, book agent, and Bishop of the Methodist Episcopal Church, elected in 1836.

== Birth and early years ==
Waugh was born on October 28, 1789, in Fairfax County, Virginia, the son of a veteran of the American Revolutionary War. At the age of fifteen, he was converted to the Christian faith and became a member of the Methodist Episcopal Church at Alexandria, Virginia. It is believed that he was employed as a clerk in a government office or in business for three or four years, given the excellent penmanship and accuracy of his accounts throughout his life. From the time he was eighteen until shortly before his death, he kept a journal which, in the end, amounted to several manuscript volumes.

== Ordained ministry ==
In 1809, aged 20, Waugh entered the itinerant ministry of the Baltimore Annual Conference. After three years he was stationed in the city of Washington. For 18 years he filled a number of the most prominent appointments in the Baltimore Conference.

Waugh was elected by his peers to be a delegate to the General Conferences of 1816 and 1820, representing the Baltimore Conference. For the 1824 General Conference, because he was in favor of an elected Presiding Eldership (which the majority of his conference did not approve), he was not elected a delegate.

In 1828, Waugh was again elected a member of General Conference, and was, at that time, chosen Assistant Editor and Agent of the Book Concern of the Methodist Episcopal Church, resulting in his restationing to New York City. This also necessitated his transfer to the New York Annual Conference, as the rule in force at that time constituted the Assistant Book Agent a member of that body. In his work with the Book Concern, Waugh was closely associated with John Emory, later Bishop.

In 1832, Waugh was made the principal agent, through not a member of the General Conference that year. He was again a member of the 1836 General Conference.

== Episcopal ministry ==
Waugh was elected to the Episcopacy of the Methodist Episcopal Church by the 1836 General Conference. He filled this highest office in the ordained ministry for nearly 22 years. After the death of Bishop Hedding in 1852, he was the Senior Bishop of his denomination.

Waugh traveled almost constantly. He was never absent from one of his conferences. He organized the Rock River, Texas Annual Conference, with only nine members, as well as other Annual Conferences. Long before the time of railroads, his routes ranged from Michigan to Georgia, and Maine to Texas. He shared with his colleagues the responsibility of presiding over five sessions of the General Conference, some of which were the most laborious and difficult known in the history of the Church. It is supposed that the average number of preachers appointed by him per annum was probably 550, or about 12,000 altogether.

A son, Beverly R. Waugh (1824–1861), was also an ordained Methodist Episcopal minister but who spent most of his career involved in education, including as principal of Baltimore Female College and Pennsylvania Female College.

== Death ==
Waugh visited Carlisle, Pennsylvania, for several days in January 1858 to assist in a revival of religion. On his return home, he was seized with erysipelas and died on February 9, 1858, in Baltimore. The immediate cause of his death is supposed to have been an affection of the heart. He was buried in the Mount Olivet Cemetery in Baltimore, near the graves of Bishops Francis Asbury, Enoch George and John Emory.

== Selected writings ==
- Beverly Waugh's Journal. Manuscripts from 1807, continued with gaps for many years
- A Series of Questions for Bible Classes, with J. Emory, 1828.
- Wesley's Works, Editor (with John Emory), 1831.
- "Nature and Objects of the Methodist Book Concern", a statement in Emory's Life and Works, R. Emory, 1841.
- "Funeral discourse on Bishop Roberts" in Sermons on Miscellaneous Subjects, Cincinnati, 1847.

== See also ==
- List of bishops of the United Methodist Church
