= Bishop Asbury Cottage =

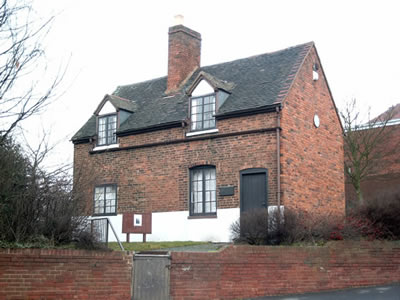

General information
- Type: Cottage
- Location: Newton Road, Great Barr, Sandwell, West Midlands, England
- Coordinates: 52.543101°N 1.955008°W
- Construction started: c. 1700
- Owner: Sandwell Metropolitan Borough Council

Design and construction
- Designations: Grade II listed

Website
- Sandwell MBC Microsite

Bishop Asbury Cottage (grid reference SP 03150 93920) is a 17th-century cottage on Newton Road, Great Barr, England, known for being the boyhood home of Francis Asbury (1745–1816), one of the first two bishops of the Methodist Episcopal Church (now The United Methodist Church) in the United States. It is now a museum in his memory.

== Architecture ==
The single-storey cottage, then in Staffordshire, was built c. 1700 from brick. It has an attic with dormer windows, a tiled roof, and a rendered plinth.

== The Asburys ==
Asbury was born in nearby Hamstead in 1745, and the family moved to the cottage the next year. Asbury worshipped as a Methodist at nearby Wednesbury. He apprenticed as a blacksmith before becoming a full-time preacher at the age of 21.

He left for America in 1771 and never returned. His family remained at the cottage until his mother Eliza's death in 1802. These services continued after the death of Asbury's parents. Eventually, the congregation moved to "The Institute" across the road, which became the Newton Road United Reformed Church and continued until 2017.

== Later history ==
By the 1950s, the cottage was owned by a brewery, but had no running water and only a cesspit toilet. It was occupied by a Mrs Randles and her daughter Mrs Searle, who often showed visiting American Methodists around the building. The brewery applied for permission to demolish it, but this was refused at the behest of local councillor Mrs Parfitt, a Methodist, once its history became apparent. Around 1955, the cottage was purchased by the local council, which then rehoused the occupants.

The building was part of a terraced pair, but in 1964 the adjacent, southern cottage was demolished when Newton Road (designated the A4041) was widened. Local legend has it that it was the demolished cottage which was the Asburys', but documentary evidence in Sandwell Museum disproves this.

A Grade II listed building since September 1955, the cottage is now operated as a museum, furnished in period style, with memorabilia and information relating to Asbury's life in West Bromwich and Great Barr in England and later in the United States. It also has displays about the rise of Methodism in the surrounding Black Country, John Wesley's life and times, and visits to the local area.

== See also ==
- Charlemont and Grove Vale

== Bibliography ==
- Hallam, David J.A. "Eliza Asbury: her cottage and her son" Studley, 2003 ISBN 1 85858 2350
- Hallam, David J.A. "One hundred years of service to Newton: The history of Newton Road United Reformed (Allen Memorial) Church 1917-2017 Smethwick, 2018 ISBN 978-1-9999387-0-3
