= Richard Whatcoat =

American Methodist bishop

Richard Whatcoat (February 23, 1736 – July 4, 1806) was the third bishop of the American Methodist Episcopal Church.

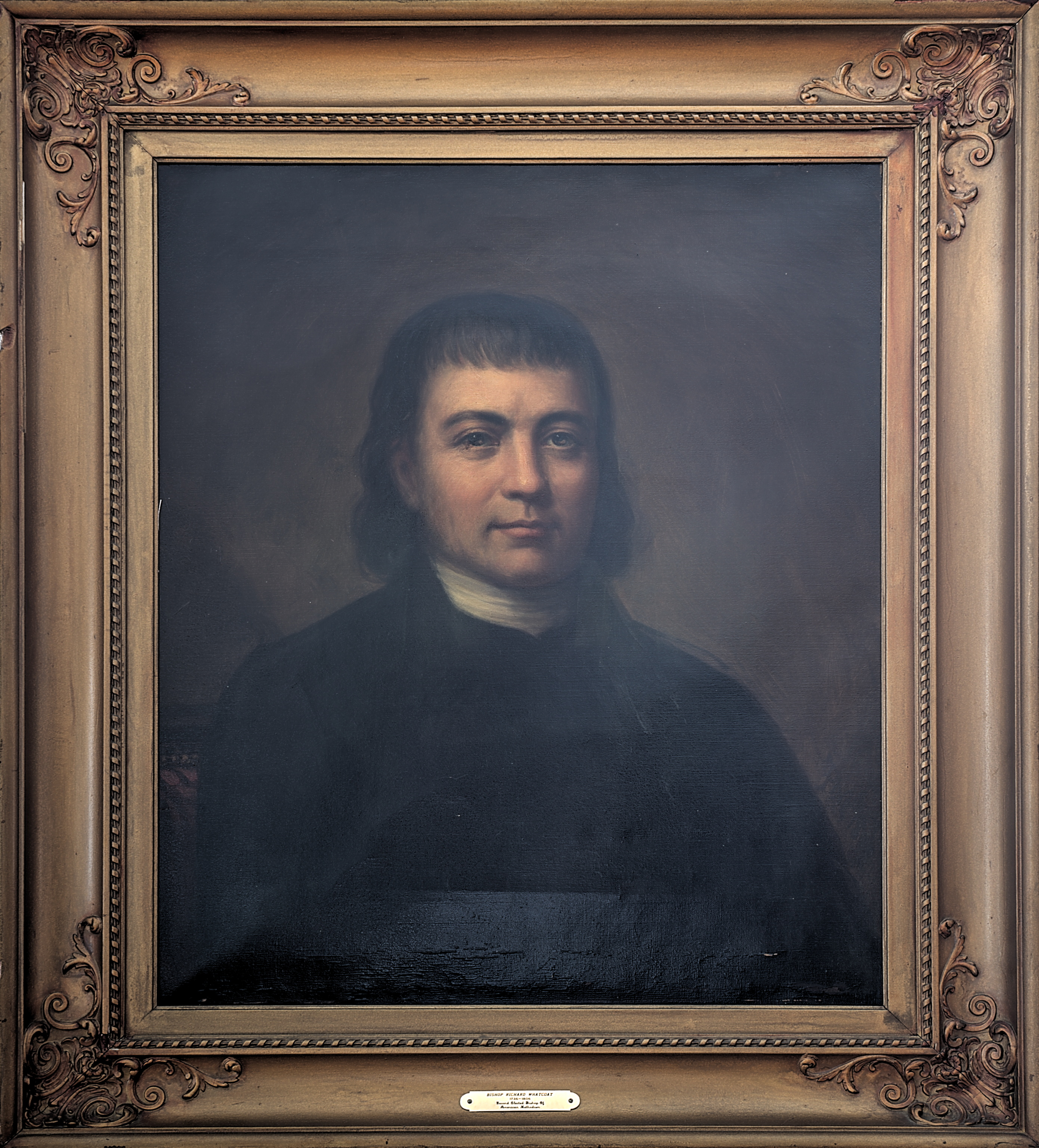
Painting of Whatcoat on display at the World Methodist Museum, Lake Junaluska, NC

== Early life ==
Whatcoat was born in Quinton Gloucestershire, England. His mother and father were Charles and Mary Whatcoat. He considered himself fortunate to be in Church of England parish where the Minister, the Reverend Samuel Taylor, was "a converted man". He believed his mother to be converted. His father died when he was young, leaving his mother with two sons and three daughters. When he was thirteen Whatcoat was apprenticed to Mr. Joseph Jones who lived in Birmingham, shortly after moving to Darlaston in Staffordshire.

== Whatcoat's conversion ==
After completing his apprenticeship at the age of twenty-one, in 1757, he moved to nearby Wednesbury. There he began attending Methodist meetings and was challenged by their preaching which he described as "light and power to my soul". On the third of September 1758 he had a conversion experience. He was reading his Bible when he came across Romans 8:16, "The Spirit itself beareth witness with our Spirit, that we are children of God". Whatcoat claimed that in that moment "my darkness was removed, and the Spirit did bear witness with my Spirit, that I was a child of God. In the same instant I was filled with unspeakable peace and joy in believing: all fear of death, judgement, and hell, suddenly vanished."

Whatcoat's spiritual journey continued and on the 28 March 1761 he came to the belief that grace was a free gift of God, stating "my soul was drawn out and engaged in a manner it never was before. Suddenly I was stripped of all but love". He then spent the rest of his time in Wednesbury serving as a band leader, class leader and society steward amongst the growing Methodist community in the town.

== Methodism in Wednesbury ==
Methodism in Wednesbury at that time was recovering from the severe persecutions during the 1743 and 1744 anti-Methodist riots. Sporadic but serious instances of persecution continued across the West Midlands well into the 1760s. The Methodist community which met at Wednesbury included the young Francis Asbury, with whom Whatcoat developed a lifelong friendship, and William Legge the 2nd Earl of Dartmouth.

== Circuit work in Great Britain and Ireland ==
Whatcoat wanted to develop his ministry and it became his full-time employment in 1769. John Pawson proposed him at that year's Methodist Conference and he was accepted as a probationer, initially stationed at Oxford. His subsequent stations were: 1770 Bedford, England; 1771 Inniskillen, Ireland; 1772 Armah, Ireland (during much of this stationing he was seriously ill); 1773 Pembrook, Wales; 1774 Brecknock, Wales; 1776 Launceston, Cornwall, England; 1777 St. Austle, Cornwall, England; 1778 Salisbury, Wiltshire, England; 1780 Northampton, England; 1781 Canterbury, Kent, England; 1782 King's Lynn, Norfolk, England; 1783 Norwich, Norfolk, England.

== Travels to America ==
Methodism was originally conceived as a society within the Church of England, not a separate denomination. During the War of Independence the Church of England in the United States collapsed, and most of the clergy left. This denied Methodist societies access to the sacraments of baptism and holy communion. In 1784 John Wesley remedied the situation himself by consecration—with the assistance of fellow Anglican priest James Creighton—Thomas Coke to be a superintendent, and appointing him to serve jointly with Francis Asbury in the United States. Coke, along with Thomas Vasey and Whatcoat, both of whom had been ordained as elders by Coke, Creighton, and Wesley, set sail to America.

Coke, Vasey and Whatcoat set out for New York from Bristol on the 28th September 1784. The ship was called the "Four Friends" and during the first four days they were sea sick. They soon settled into a routine of prayers each morning and evening, with two preaching services on Sundays. They spent the evening reading up on the lives of preachers, saints, and divinity. At one point a fifteen-foot whale accompanied the ship, on another occasion they caught and ate a dolphin. The wind was against them and the journey was difficult with two nights of thunder and lightning. The arrived in New York six weeks and thousand miles later on 3 November 1784.

In December, at the Christmas Conference, Coke, Whatcoat, and Vasey ordained Asbury as a deacon and then an elder. They then finally consecrated him to the superintendency on Christmas Day in Baltimore, assisted by Philip William Otterbein of the German Reformed Church of Baltimore. Three years later Coke and Asbury assumed the title "Bishop", which did not please John Wesley.

== Ministry in America ==
Whatcoat threw himself wholeheartedly into the itinerant Methodist ministry across the thirteen states. He accompanied Francis Asbury on long missionary journeys taking him to many parts of the new country. Frequently they were in danger from Native Americans. Whatcoat and Asbury would often share the preaching, with one speaking in the morning, and the other in the afternoon. He kept a journal as Asbury had done and Asbury mentions Whatcoat on many occasions in his own journal. Whatcoat's short auto-biography, published after his death, records many long journeys and preaching engagements.

At the quadrennial Methodist conference held in Baltimore, Maryland in May 1800, Whatcoat was elected the third bishop of the new church. "We had a most blessed time," he recalled, "and much preaching and fervent prayers, and strong exhortation through the city, while the high praises of a gracious God reverberated from street to street, house to house, which greatly alarmed the citizens. It was thought that not less than two hundred were converted during the sitting of the conference."

During the last few years of his ministry Whatcoat continued to travel and preach even though he was by then in his late sixties, and often unwell. In July 1805 he wrote "Notwithstanding my infirm state of body, through the blessing of God. I have been able to travel three thousand four hundred and sixteen miles the last twelve month.....I have great reason to bless God, who has preserved me these many years as an itinerant preacher, during which he have delivered me from many afflictions of body and mind."

By the time of his death in 1806 he had been in itinerant ministry for thirty-seven years, and had spent twenty-two of them in the United States. He never returned to England and never married.

== Bibliography ==
- Phœbus, William, Ed, Memoirs of the Rev. Richard Whatcoat, Late Bishop of the Methodist Episcopal Church, New York, 1828
- Hallam, David J.A., Eliza Asbury: her cottage and her son, Studley 2003
- Clarke, E.T., Manning Potts, T., Payton, Jacob S., Editors The Journal and Letters of Francis Asbury, Vols. 1-3, Nashville and London, 1958
- The life of R. W. written by himself in : Jackson (Thomas) Wesleyan Minister. The lives of early Methodist Preachers, etc. Vol. 3. 1837, etc. 12º
- Samuel J. Rogal 2001 To Go and Serve the Desolate Sheep in America, The Diary/Journal of Bishop Richard Whatcoat 1789-1800. Academia Press, Dublin, London.
- Wm. W. Sweet 1946 Religion on the American Frontier, Vol. IV The Methodists. University of Chicago Press.
- S. B. Bradley 1936, Louisville: The Life of Bishop Richard Whatcoat.

== See also ==
- List of bishops of the United Methodist Church
