= Lovely Lane Methodist Church =

Historic church in Maryland, United States

- Lovely Lane United Methodist Church
- U.S. National Register of Historic Places
- Baltimore City Landmark
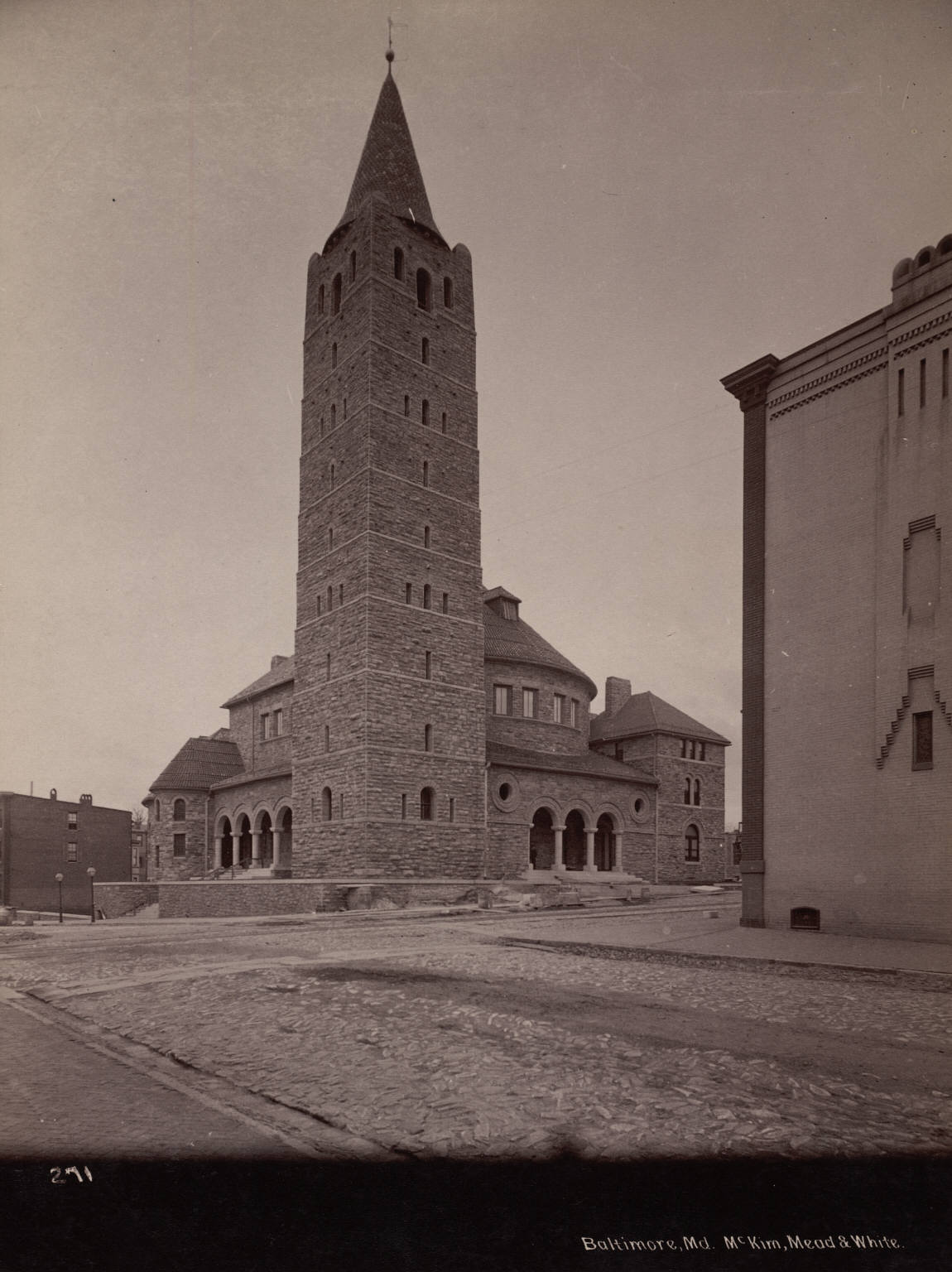
- First Methodist Episcopal Church (Lovely Lane United Methodist Church), 1895.

- Location within Baltimore Location within Maryland Location within the United States
- Location: 2200 St. Paul Street, Baltimore, Maryland
- Coordinates: 39°18′52″N 76°36′57″W
- Area: 1 acre (0.40 ha)
- Built: 1884
- Architect: Stanford White
- Architectural style: Romanesque
- NRHP reference No.: 73002189

Significant dates
- Added to NRHP: May 25, 1973
- Designated BCL: 1971

Lovely Lane United Methodist Church (formerly known as First Methodist Episcopal Church and Lovely Lane Chapel) is a historic United Methodist church at 2200 St. Paul Street in the Charles Village neighborhood of Baltimore, Maryland, United States.

The building was designed by renowned New York City architect Stanford White in the Romanesque Revival style and completed in 1884 as the "Centennial Monument of American Methodism". It is patterned after the early churches and basilicas in Ravenna, Italy. The exterior is constructed of a gray ashlar granite with limited ornamentation. It features a square bell tower patterned after the campanile of the 12th century church of Santa Maria, Abbey of Pomposa, near Ravenna. The pulpit is a reproduction of the one at St. Apollinaris, in Ravenna.

Locally influential architect Charles L. Carson was supervising architect for the McKim, Mead & White firm during construction of the church. Lovely Lane Methodist Church was listed on the National Register of Historic Places in 1973.

The pipe organ in the church was built in 1930 by the Austin Organ Company as its Opus 1738. The case remains from the original organ of 1887, Hilborne L. Roosevelt’s Opus 336, which had been enlarged by Adam Stein (1844–1922) in 1914. The Austin instrument incorporates a few of the Roosevelt and Stein pipes. This organ was played in recital during the Organ Historical Society Convention in July 2024. The Sunday School Chapel houses an historic pipe organ built by Hilborne L. Roosevelt, in 1885 (Opus 239). It was restored by Richard Howell (1985) and the Reservoir was releathered by David Storey (2008). This Roosevelt pipe organ was played in recital during the Organ Historical Society Convention in July 2024.

== Lovely Lane Chapel ==
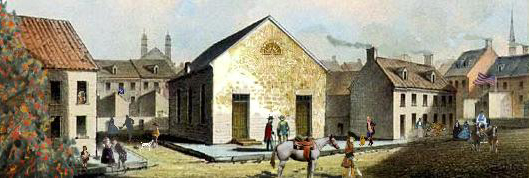
A painting shows the original Lovely Lane Meeting House.

The congregation is known as the "Mother Church of American Methodism." The original Lovely Lane Chapel or Meeting House was the scene of the December 1784 "Christmas Conference", at which the Methodist Episcopal Church in the United States was founded and Francis Asbury and Thomas Coke were ordained as its first bishops.

The plain original chapel on Lovely Lane, off German (now Redwood) Street, between South Calvert Street and South Street in the city's waterfront district, was abandoned in 1786 and demolished. It was replaced (first) by an elaborate beaux-arts structure of the Merchants Club, and now the building contains a restaurant as well as offices and teaching space used by Chesapeake Shakespeare Company.

== Gallery ==
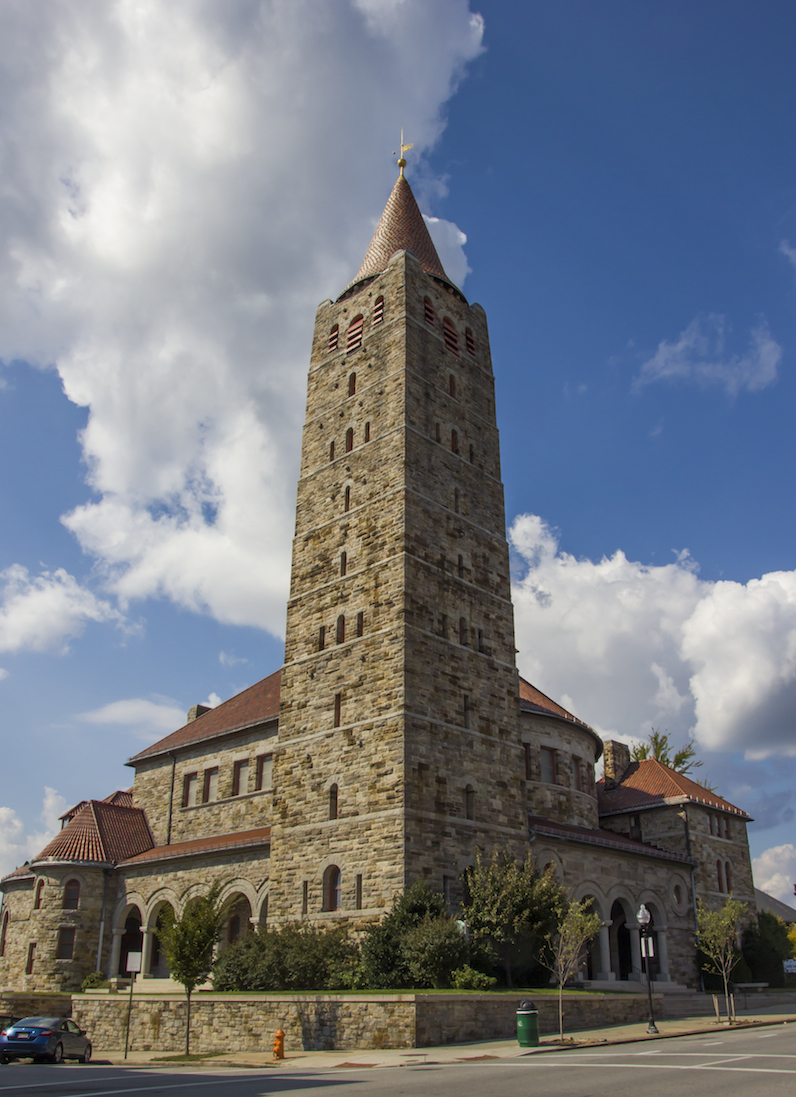
Exterior in 2012

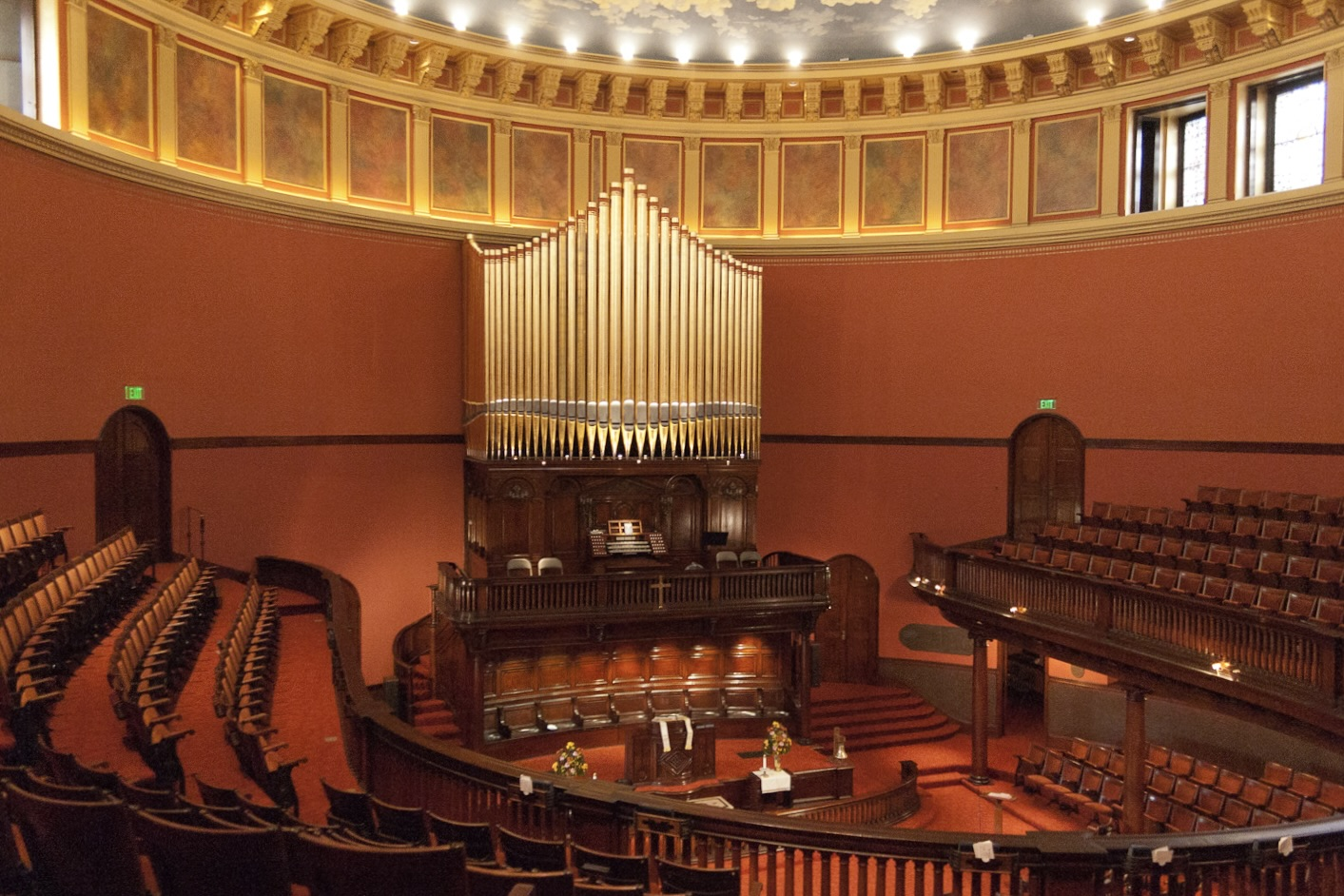
Interior of the First Methodist Episcopal Church, now Lovely Lane United Methodist Church on St. Paul Street.

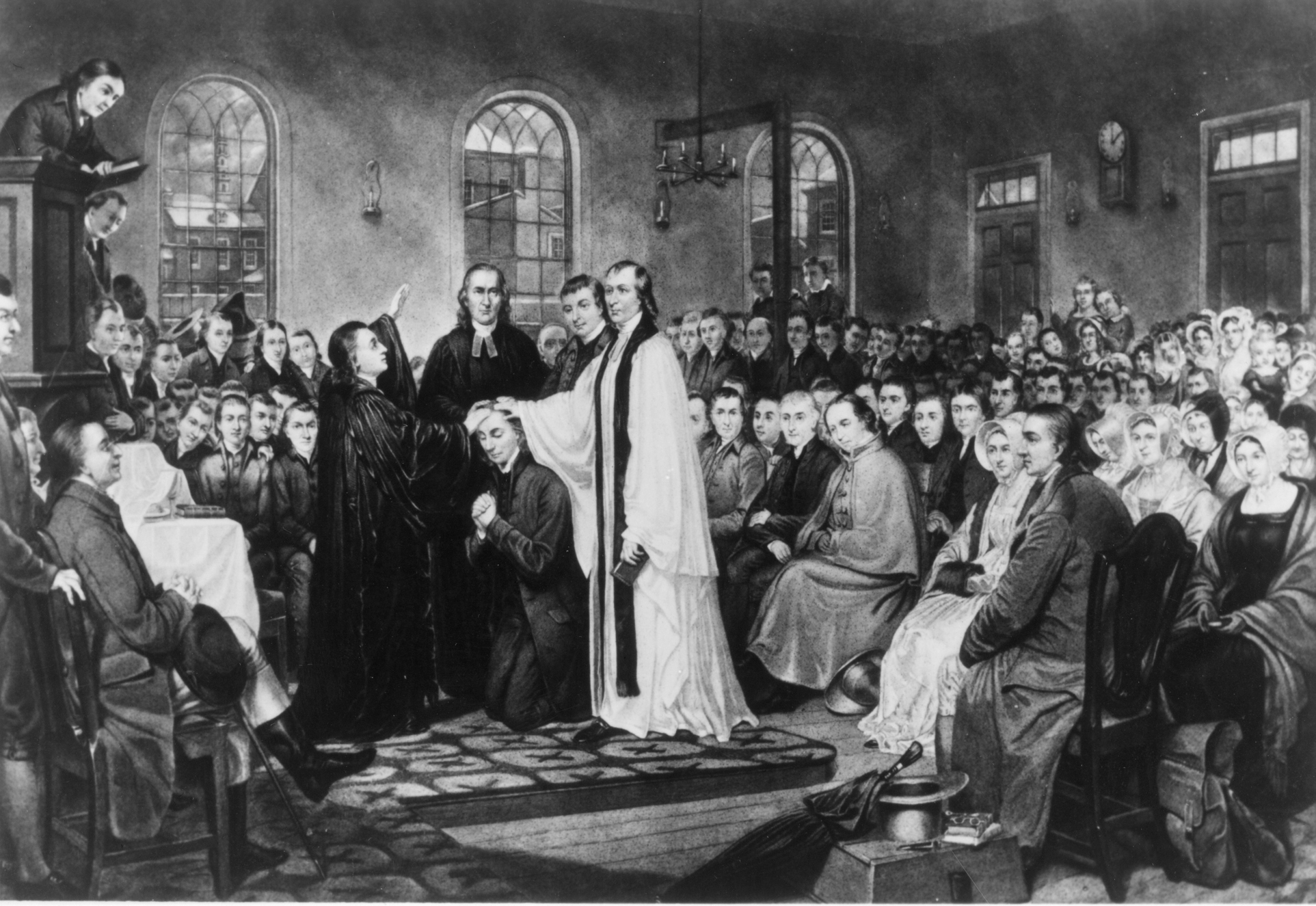
The Ordination of Bishop Francis Asbury at the December 1784 "Christmas Conference".
