= Christopher Rush =

Christopher Rush may refer to:

- Christopher Rush (bishop) (1777–1873), African-American freed slave and bishop of the AME Zion Church
- Christopher Rush (writer) (born 1944), Scottish fiction writer
- Christopher Rush (illustrator) (1965–2016), American illustrator for Magic: The Gathering
