= Cokesbury =

Bookstores of the United States

- Company type: Subsidiary
- Industry: Religious publications
- Headquarters: Nashville, Tennessee, US
- Parent: United Methodist Publishing House
- Website: cokesbury.com

Cokesbury is the retail division of the United Methodist Publishing House. Based in Nashville, Tennessee, Cokesbury serves as an agency of the United Methodist Church but serves also as an ecumenical resource provider to other denominations.

== Origins ==
The history of the United Methodist Publishing House dates back officially to 1789 as its colophon and official trademark bear testimony. Unofficially, however, there were prior efforts in American Methodist publishing as far back as 1740. By 1775, American printers had issued over 300 distinctly Methodist publications, though largely without John Wesley's own approval.

The most systematic printing of Methodist resources came under the actions of Robert Williams, a British preacher who had recently come to America for a fresh start in 1769. The controversy surround the printing and selling of Methodist resources in America under Williams helped solidify the need for a Methodist publishing and distribution policy and in America, as was in London. At the American Methodist conference in 1775 Thomas Rankin, under the approval of Wesley, oversaw the development of a Methodist material circulation plan, though this was designed exclusively for imported Methodist materials from England. Despite this plan's initial success, his exodus from America in 1778 during the Revolutionary War led to its ultimate dissolve in 1782 under Francis Asbury.

The termination of Rankin's circulation plan coincided with a new publishing plan which would ultimately become the official American Methodist publishing line. In 1774 John Dickins joined the Methodist movement and quickly became one of the leading Methodist preachers in America. Because of Dickins' education, skill, and platform in America, Francis Asbury befriended Dickins probably in part because of publishing potential. Though Asbury was never directly involved in Methodist publishing, his influence in its development is realized in the UMPH and Cokesbury icon, which shows Asbury as a circuit rider.

As it turns out, in 1783 Dickins sold his wife's dower land and in 1784, Dickins helped found the Methodist Episcopal Church which elected Thomas Coke and Francis Asbury as the first Bishops. In 1789 Dickens used some of the money from the sale of the dower land to establish the "Methodist Book Concern" for the publication and distribution of Methodist materials. It was an immediate success and the Methodist Book Concern became the main publisher and distributor of Methodist materials in America. Indeed, as the UMPH and Cokesbury seal give testimony to, Methodist circuit riders purchased items from the Methodist Book Concern and distributed them at their meetings. This distribution process is one of the reasons why Cokesbury traces its lineage back to the earliest efforts of the Concern.

== From Methodist Episcopal Book Concern to Cokesbury ==
In 1844, a split occurred in the Methodist Episcopal Church over the issue of slavery. What resulted was the formation of the Methodist Episcopal Church, South. Concerning the name which the Southern states adopted, the Advocate and Journal of New York stated, "Not exactly English, but we shall be glad if the title is the worst of it...". And since the Methodist Episcopal Church officially owned the Methodist Book Concern, there existed significant tensions concerning publications and finances. Eventually, in 1854 the Supreme Court ruled that the Methodist Episcopal Church, South had as much right to the funds of the Methodist Book Concern as the Northern states did. No longer were the Southern states dependent on the publishing decisions of the North. It was at this time that the Methodist Episcopal Church, South agreed to set up their publishing and distribution center in Nashville, Tennessee, which is where the current UMPH headquarters are.

The effects of this split between the church and the two book concerns would outlast the Civil War. In the early twentieth century, both the North and the South saw need to organize strict publishing bodies within their houses. This was, in part, to broaden the appeal of ecumenical distribution and in other part due to the growing need to simplify publishing and distribution processes. On April 23, 1914, the North adopted the name 'Abingdon Press' for its general ecumenical publishing endeavors. Its name was historically significant for Abingdon was the name of the town in Maryland where the first American Methodist college, Cokesbury College, was opened in 1787. The Methodist Episcopal Church, South in 1923 chose 'Cokesbury Press', a name which was passed over by the Northern church.

It wasn't until 1939 that the Methodist Episcopal Church and the Methodist Episcopal Church, South reunited, along with it the Methodist Protestant Church. The merger resulted in the creation of The Methodist Church (which would later merge in 1968 with the Evangelical United Brethren to become The United Methodist Church). Along with the 1939 merger came the union of the two book concerns. Abingdon-Cokesbury became the official trade name.

== Cokesbury stores and beyond ==
It was inevitable that as the publishing and distribution efforts of Methodist Publishing grew that there would need to be a sharper distinction between those efforts. The first use of the name Cokesbury for a specific store occurred in 1925 when Bliss Albright, the retail manager at the Dallas Store, put a sign in the window reading "Cokesbury Press", named so because of the 1923 decision by the Methodist Episcopal Church, South. This later became Cokesbury Book Store.

It was during this time that manager Lovick Pierce, who would later become the president of the Publishing House, put the Dallas store in the national and international spotlight. This prominence, as one of the nation's leading Christian bookstores, would not fade for decades to come. In fact, it is probably in part due to the success of the Dallas store that by 1950 it was instructed that all retail stores would be called a 'Cokesbury Book Store', a move which coincided with the 1954 decision to rename Abingdon-Cokesbury Press simply Abingdon.

Since its inception, Cokesbury has been the largest source of net income for UMPH. Indeed, former Dallas manager and president of UMPH Lovick Pierce said as he was departing his position in 1970, "As Cokesbury retail sales go, so goes the Publishing House". It was during Pierce's time that Cokesbury expanded its retail centers, broaden its statement of faith, and actively pursue both United Methodist and non-Methodist churches in a consultative mode. By 1976 there were 28 Cokesbury stores in 26 cities. This number would eventually double over Cokesbury's retail history.

In 1986, Cokesbury launched a toll-free telephone number for customers to call in their orders: 1-800-672-1789. The last four digits reflect the official origins of UMPH. This number is still the number for the contact center.

On November 5, 2012, Cokesbury made a critical decision to shut down all of their physical stores, a total of 57. Nineteen of the stores were situated at seminaries across the US. The decision was made unanimously by the UMPH board due to growing digital market, the increase on online book selling, and unsustainable cost of keeping the stores open given those prior factors. One April 27, 2013, the last six Cokesbury stores were closed.

Cokesbury has now shifted its focus largely to online sales and church consulting. In addition to extending call center hours, Cokesbury has deployed over fifty national representatives called Community Resource Consultants as well as Nashville based Resource Consultants to work directly with churches and customers throughout the United States.
