= Thomas James (minister, born 1804) =

American slavery survivor and minister (1804–1891)

Thomas James (1804–1891) had been a slave who became an African Methodist Episcopal Zion minister, abolitionist, administrator and author. He was active in New York and Massachusetts with abolitionists, and served with the American Missionary Association and the Union Army during the American Civil War to supervise the contraband camp in Louisville, Kentucky. After the war, he held national offices in the AME Church and was a missionary to black churches in Ohio. While in Massachusetts, he challenged the railroad's custom of forcing blacks into second-class carriages and won a reversal of the rule in the State Supreme Court. He wrote a short memoir published in 1886.

== Early life ==
Thomas James was born into slavery in Canajoharie, New York, in 1804 and named Tom. He was the third child of four of his mother and never knew his father. His family was enslaved by Asa Kimball. A younger sister died when Tom was a child; when he was only eight, he lost his mother, brother and older sister when Kimball sold them away. He never saw his mother or sister again, though his brother, Archibald, would join Thomas in Rochester NY by 1870.

When Tom was seventeen, Kimball died, and all his property, including Tom, was sold to a neighbor named Cromwell Bartlett. Bartlett soon traded Tom to George H. Hess, a wealthy farmer. James would write in his 1886 autobiography: "Master Hess ... had worked me hard, and at last undertook to whip me. This led me to seek escape from slavery." Tom ran away in June 1821, becoming a "freedom seeker".

== Freedom ==
He left at night and made his way west along the staked path of the future Erie Canal to Lockport. With help, he crossed the Niagara River to Canada and freedom. He stayed about three months until he thought return was safe.

== Career and activism ==
=== Initial work and education ===
Going to Rochester, Tom found a community of free blacks and more opportunity for work and education. He started working as a laborer. At nineteen Tom attended a church school to learn how to read and write. Gaining literacy opened the door to religion for him, and in 1823 he joined the African Methodist Episcopal Zion Society (AME Zion).

With the opening of the Erie Canal, Tom got a job in the warehouse (where he was called Jim) of the Hudson and Erie line. He boarded with its manager, and also worked around his house. Eventually he was put in charge of the lading of boats and the freight business.

=== Teaching ===
In 1828 Tom started teaching at a school for black children.

=== Ministry ===
The next year started preaching. By 1830 James bought a site and built a small church in Rochester, called the AME Zion Church. When ordained as an African Methodist Episcopal Zion minister in 1833 by AME Zion Bishop Christopher Rush, he took the name Thomas James, his name as a free man.

Assigned to a small black congregation in Syracuse, New York, in 1835, James attracted new members and founded the AME Zion Church. He built the congregation from less than 20 to four times that, and helped the congregation purchase a former Methodist church in 1837 for its use. This was the largest African American congregation in the city before the Civil War, and members were active in abolitionism and Underground Railroad activities.

=== Anti-slavery movement ===
Beginning in 1830, James was influenced by the abolitionism of some members of the American Colonization Society (ACS) and writings by Arthur Tappan. He vowed to make the cause his life's work. He began to organize with others in Rochester, including leading white citizens, to hold anti-slavery meetings and form an anti-slavery society in the city. Sometimes they were greeted with violence, but they continued. He was one of two founders of the bi-weekly paper, The Rights of Man, to promote the cause. James traveled in the county to raise money by subscriptions for the paper. He gradually started speaking at more venues on the cause of abolitionism and attended the first Anti-Slavery Society Conference in Utica.

Next James was assigned to Ithaca, where a small black religious society already existed. During his two years, James helped the congregation build a church. Next he was sent to Sag Harbor, New York, where many free blacks worked in the whaling industry. Last he went to New Bedford, Massachusetts, also a whaling and fishing town. While James led a church, he ordained the future abolitionist Frederick Douglass as a preacher in his congregation, before the beginning of Douglass's major public career.

=== Freedom Trail ===
He contributed to the growing anti-slavery movement in Syracuse and efforts to help escaped slaves on the "Freedom Trail".

James was also active with the anti-slavery movement in Massachusetts when he lived there. James directly helped some slaves gain freedom. For example, while returning to the state by train, he met a young slave girl named Lucy, traveling with her slaveowners from Richmond, Virginia. Talking with her in the segregated car, where they were both required to sit, he invited her to attend his church while they were on vacation in the area. A few weeks passed, but she did not come. James went to her master, who said that his slaves could not receive calls and she could not attend his church. James turned to the law for help, and the local sheriff helped free the girl from her slaveowner. Local blacks also helped protect the girl during the events that followed. In the following court case held in Boston, the judge announced that according to the laws of Massachusetts, which prohibited slavery, Lucy was free and had the choice of whether to claim that freedom. She did so, and became free the following day. James also assisted with the Amistad case and issues.

=== Fugitive Slave Act ===
While in Boston, James was actively involved in cases dealing with escaped slaves, such as Anthony Burns and Ellen and William Craft. Although the federal Fugitive Slave Act passed in 1850 required states to return slaves to their owners, many Massachusetts citizens strongly opposed the law and helped slaves achieve freedom, even in the face of US Marshals.

=== Equality ===
James also successfully challenged the custom of assigning blacks to second class on railroads and other transportation. When the railroad case was heard on appeal by the State Supreme Court in Boston, "the court decided that the word "color," as applied to persons, was unknown to the laws of the commonwealth of Massachusetts, and that the youngest colored child had the same rights as the richest white citizen."

=== Missionary work ===
In 1856 James returned to Rochester. After the start of the American Civil War, in 1862 he was assigned to the American Missionary Association to minister to slaves in Tennessee and Louisiana, but was reassigned to Louisville, Kentucky. There he served the occupying Union Army under generals Stephen G. Burbridge and Owen M. Palmer. He helped supervise the contraband camps, liberated slaves who were being held illegally by traders, and monitored d visited the prisons. By orders of Palmer, James performed marriages between the United States Colored Troops (USCT) soldiers and black women who came to the camp, to help the latter achieve their legal freedom as wives of USCT. (At the time the Emancipation Proclamation did not apply to Kentucky and slavery was still a legal institution.)

After the war in 1868, James was elected general superintendent and missionary agent by the General Conference of the African Methodist Episcopal Congregation. In 1878 Bishop Wayman appointed James as a missionary preacher for the black churches of Ohio. The continuing unsettled state of southern sympathizers was shown by James' being threatened in Darke County by Regulators, one of the insurgent groups active after the war.

=== Topeka Relief Association ===
In 1880, when the exodus from the South to the West began, James worked with the Topeka Relief Association to help the thousands of black migrants arriving in Kansas, who were known as the Exodusters. A total of 60,000 passed through Topeka. The following year, James worked with others in southern Kansas to organize the Agricultural and Industrial Institute (later merged with Pittsburg State University). Among the other founders was Elizabeth L. Comstock, an English Quaker who also had aided in the relief efforts in Topeka. James became general agent of the school, one of many established in Kansas.

== Marriages and family ==
James married his first wife, Mary Ann McEntire, in 1829 in Rochester, New York. In his memoir he wrote: "In 1829 I married in this city a free colored girl, and by her had four children, two of whom are now [i.e., 1887] married and living at the West. My first wife died in 1841.

Two of their children died young and were buried in Rochester. Thomas mentions a daughter Nancy James in his will (written in 1891), She is called Nancy Thompson in his obituary "Rev. Thomas James: Death of the Aged Colored Clergy-Man of This City" in Rochester Union and Advertiser, printed April 18, 1891.

Another daughter (mother unknown) was Eliza James (1845–1896), who went with her father in 1862 to Louisville, Kentucky, and served as a nurse during the Civil War. US Census records show she married Benjamin Thomas in 1867, had nine children, and lived near her father in Rochester.

In 1870, James married again, to Esther A. (née Jones) Hazgood. He wrote: "My wife was a slave, freed by Sherman at the capture of Atlanta and sent north with other colored refugees. I first met her in the state of Pennsylvania." President Abraham Lincoln's Emancipation Proclamation freed all slaves in Confederate territory behind Union lines. US Census records show that Thomas and Esther had two children together: Ida James (1870–1887) and Thomas Edward James (1874–1934), who married Grace Burghardt (a second cousin of W.E.B. DuBois). Esther's daughter Eliza Hazgood James (1866–1886) also lived in their household.

== Later life ==
About 1882 James returned to New York state and a parish in Lockport. About 1884, suffering cataracts, James returned with his wife Eliza to Rochester. To raise money, he dictated a short memoir, published in 1886 and titled: "LIFE OF REV. THOMAS JAMES, BY HIMSELF."

== Death ==
James died at his home 144 Tremont Street in Rochester on April 18, 1891.
