= Methodist Episcopal Church, South =

Methodist denomination

- Classification: Protestant
- Orientation: Methodism
- Polity: Episcopal
- Separated from: Methodist Episcopal Church
- Separations: Congregational Methodist Church (1852); Christian Methodist Episcopal Church (1870); New Congregational Methodist Church (1881); People's Methodist Church (1938); Southern Methodist Church (1940)
- Merged into: Methodist Church (1939)

The Methodist Episcopal Church, South (MEC, S; also Methodist Episcopal Church South) was the American Methodist denomination resulting from the 19th-century split over the issue of slavery in the Methodist Episcopal Church (MEC). Disagreement on this issue had been increasing in strength for decades between churches of the Northern and Southern United States; in 1844 it resulted in a schism at the General Conference of the MEC held in New York, New York.

This body maintained its own polity for nearly 100 years until the formation in 1939 of the Methodist Church, uniting the Methodist Episcopal Church, South, with the older Methodist Episcopal Church and much of the Methodist Protestant Church, which had separated from Methodist Episcopal Church in 1828. The Methodist Church in turn merged in 1968 with the Evangelical United Brethren Church to form the United Methodist Church, one of the largest and most widely spread Christian denominations in America.

In 1940, some more theologically conservative MEC,S congregations, which dissented from the 1939 merger, formed the Southern Methodist Church, which still exists as a small, conservative denomination headquartered in South Carolina. Some dissenting congregations from the Methodist Protestant Church also objected to the 1940 merger and continue as a separate denomination, headquartered in Mississippi.

== History ==
John Wesley, the founder of Methodism, was appalled by slavery in the British colonies. When the Methodist Episcopal Church (MEC) was founded in the United States at the "Christmas Conference" synod meeting of ministers at the Lovely Lane Chapel in Baltimore in December 1784, the denomination officially opposed slavery very early. Numerous Methodist missionaries toured the South in the "Great Awakening" and tried to convince slaveholders to manumit the people whom they enslaved. In the first two decades after the American Revolutionary War, a number did free people from slavery. The number of free blacks increased markedly at this time, especially in the Upper South.

During the early nineteenth century, Methodists and Baptists in the South began to modify their approach in order to gain support from common planters, and yeomen. They began to argue for better treatment of slaves, saying that the Bible acknowledged slavery but that Christianity had a paternalistic role to improve conditions.

The invention of the cotton gin had enabled profitable cultivation of cotton in new areas of the South, increasing the demand for slaves. Manumissions nearly ceased and, after slave rebellions, the states made them extremely difficult to accomplish. Northern Methodist congregations increasingly opposed slavery, and some members began to be active in the abolitionist movement. The southern church accommodated it as part of a legal system.

The Methodist Episcopal Church (MEC) did not explicitly forbid clergy from owning enslaved people. The controversy involving Bishop James Osgood Andrew developed as he became increasingly connected to slavery through a sequence of acquisitions, inheritances, and marriages. Andrew first became associated with slavery between 1836 and 1840 through an enslaved woman named Kitty (Catherine Boyd). His slaveholding expanded after the death of his first wife, which left him with full ownership of an enslaved man named Billy. The issue intensified in 1844 when he married Ann Leonora Mounger Greenwood Andrew, who owned several slaves from her first husband’s estate. Through this marriage, Andrew gained control over at least seventeen enslaved individuals, including Kitty, Billy, Lucy (held in trust), and the fourteen enslaved people attached to the Greenwood estate.

To avoid potential church censure, Andrew pursued legal arrangements to transfer formal ownership of some of these enslaved individuals while maintaining practical control. At the 1844 General Conference in New York, delegates voted to request that he suspend his episcopal duties “so long as this impediment remains,” prompting strong objections from Southern representatives who argued the Conference lacked constitutional authority to discipline a bishop for slaveholding. The dispute contributed directly to the formation of the Methodist Episcopal Church, South, which was organized in Louisville in 1845.

== Civil War ==
The statistics for 1859 showed the MEC,S had as enrolled members some 511,601 whites and 197,000 blacks (nearly all of whom were slaves), and 4,200 Indians. In 1858 MEC,S operated 106 schools and colleges.

The American Civil War resulted in widespread destruction of property, including church buildings and institutions, but it was marked by a series of strong revivals that began in General Robert E. Lee's army and spread throughout the region. Chaplains tended the wounded after the battles. John Berry McFerrin (1807–1887) recalled:

At Chickamauga, the slaughter was tremendous on both sides, but the Confederates held the field. I remained on the battlefield eleven days, nursing the sick, ministering to the wounded, and praying for the dying. The sight was awful. Thousands of men killed and wounded. They lay thick all around, shot in every possible manner, and the wounded dying every day. Among the wounded were many Federal soldiers. To these I ministered, prayed with them, and wrote letters by flag of truce to their friends in the North.

=== African Americans ===
After the Civil War, when African American slaves gained freedom, many left the Methodist Episcopal Church, South. They joined either the independent black denominations of the African Methodist Episcopal Church founded in Philadelphia or the African Methodist Episcopal Zion Church founded in New York, but some also joined the (Northern) Methodist Episcopal Church, which planted new congregations in the South. The two independent black denominations both sent missionaries to the South after the war to aid freedmen, and attracted hundreds of thousands of new members, from both Baptists and Methodists, and new converts to Christianity. Out of 200,000 African-American members in the MEC,S in 1860, by 1866 only 49,000 remained.

in 1870, most of the remaining African-American members of the MEC,S split off on friendly terms with white colleagues to form the Colored Methodist Episcopal Church, (Christian Methodist Episcopal Church since 1954), taking with them $1.5 million in buildings and properties. The new denomination avoided the Republican politics of the AME and AME Zion congregations. It had more than 3,000 churches, more than 1,200 traveling preachers, 2,500 church-based preachers, about 140,000 members, and held 22 annual conferences, presided over by four bishops.

=== Growth in late 19th century ===
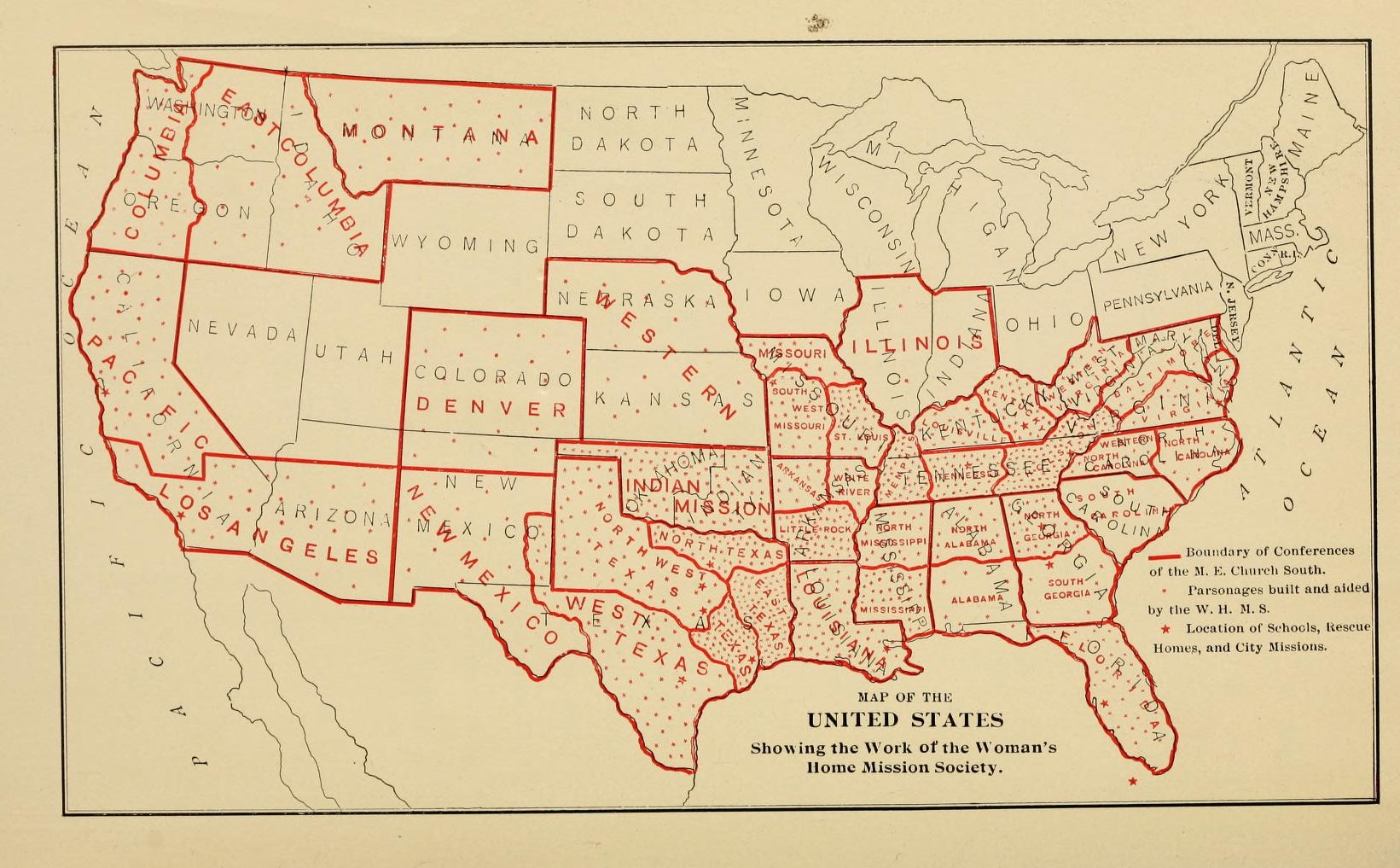
Annual Conferences of the Methodist Episcopal Church, South, as of 1901

The MEC,S energetically tended its base: in 1880 it had 798,862 members (mostly white), and 1,066,377 in 1886. It expanded its missionary activity in Mexico. Although usually avoiding politics, MEC,S in 1886 denounced divorce and called for Prohibition, stating:

The public has awakened to the necessity of both legal and moral suasion to control the great evils stimulated and fostered by the liquor traffic. We recognize in the license system a sin against society. Its essential immorality cannot be affected by the question whether the license be high or low. The effectual prohibition of the manufacture, sale, and use of intoxicating liquors would be emancipation from the greatest curse that now afflicts our race. The total removal of the cause of intemperance is the only remedy. This is the greatest moral question now before our people.... Resolved, That the time has now come when the church, through its press and pulpit, its individual and organized agencies, should speak out in strong language and stronger action in favor of the total removal of this great evil.

After 1844 the Methodists in the South increased their emphasis on an educated clergy. Ambitious young preachers from humble, rural backgrounds attended college, and were often appointed to serve congregations in towns. There they could build larger churches that paid decent salaries; they gained social prestige in a highly visible community leadership position. These ministers turned the pulpit into a profession, thus emulating the Presbyterians and Episcopalians. They created increasingly complex denominational bureaucracies to meet a series of pressing needs: defending slavery, evangelizing soldiers during the Civil War, promoting temperance reform, contributing to foreign missions (see American Southern Methodist Episcopal Mission), and supporting local colleges. The new urban middle-class ministry increasingly left their country cousins far behind. As the historian of the transformation explains, "Denomination building—that is, the bureaucratization of religion in the late antebellum South—was an inherently innovative and forward-looking task. It was, in a word, modern."

The returns for 1892 showed:

- Traveling preachers: 5,368
- Local preachers: 6,481
- White members: 1,282,750
- Colored members: 357
- Indian members: 10,759
  - Total: 1,305,715
- Sunday-schools: 13,426
- SS teachers: 95,204
- SS students: 754,223
- Churches: 12,856
- Value: $20,287,112

==== Education ====
Methodist education had suffered during the Civil War, as most academies were closed. Some recovered in the late 19th century, but demand decreased as public education had been established for the first time by Reconstruction-era legislatures across the South. It was generally a segregated system, and racial segregation was established by law for public facilities under Jim Crow rules conditions in the late 19th century, after white Democrats regained control of state legislatures in the late 1870s.

The colleges were in scarcely better condition, though philanthropy of the late 19th and early 20th centuries dramatically changed their development. Most were primarily high-school level academies offering a few collegiate courses. The dramatic exception was Vanderbilt University, at Nashville, with a million-dollar campus and an endowment of $900,000, thanks to the Vanderbilt family. Much smaller and poorer were Randolph-Macon College in Virginia, with its two affiliated fitting-schools and Randolph-Macon Woman's College; Emory College, in Atlanta (as the infusion of Candler family money was far in the future); Emory & Henry, in Southwest Virginia; Wofford, with its two fitting-schools, in South Carolina; Trinity, in North Carolina—soon to be endowed by the Duke family and change its name; Central, in Missouri; Southern, in Alabama; Southwestern, in Texas; Wesleyan, in Kentucky; Millsaps, in Mississippi; Centenary, in Louisiana; Hendrix, in Arkansas; and Pacific, in California.

The growing need for a theology school west of the Mississippi River was not addressed until the founding of Southern Methodist University in Texas in 1911. The denomination also supported several women's colleges, although they were more like finishing schools or academies until the twentieth century. At that time, they were developed to meet the standards of new accrediting agencies, such as the Southern Association of Colleges and Schools. The oldest Methodist woman's college is Wesleyan College in Macon, Georgia; other Methodist colleges that were formerly women's institutions are Lagrange College and Andrew College in Georgia, Columbia College in South Carolina, and Greensboro College in North Carolina.

In March 1900, the East Columbia Conference of the Methodist Episcopal Church-South purchased an existing school called Milton Academy, built by the Seventh-day Adventist Church in Milton, Oregon. Renamed "Columbia College", it opened September 24, 1900 under Methodist leadership. Due to declining enrollment and lack of funds, the school was closed in 1925. First year enrollment was 131 pupils, under Dean W.C. Howard. The original wood building was replaced in 1910 by a four-story stone building. It has been adapted for use as the city hall of the combined cities of Milton-Freewater, Oregon.

==== Women ====
In the 1930s, the MEC and the Methodist Protestant Church, other Methodist denominations still operating in the South, agreed to ordain women either as local elders and deacons (the MEC) or full clergy (the Methodist Protestant Church). The MEC,S did not ordain women as pastors at the time of the 1939 merger that formed the Methodist Church.

== Legacy ==
The MEC,S was responsible for founding four of the South's top divinity schools: Vanderbilt University Divinity School, Duke Divinity School, Candler School of Theology at Emory University, and Perkins School of Theology at Southern Methodist University. Vanderbilt severed its ties with the denomination in 1914. Duke, Candler, and Perkins maintain a relationship with the United Methodist Church. All four enroll students who are primarily from mainline Protestant denominations, but religion is not a test for admittance. The denomination's publishing house, opened in 1854 in Nashville, Tennessee, eventually became the headquarters of the United Methodist Publishing House. See Abingdon Press and Cokesbury.

== See also ==
- Category:American Methodist Episcopal, South bishops
- Christian Methodist Episcopal Church
- Methodist Episcopal Church
- African Methodist Episcopal Church
- African Methodist Episcopal Zion Church
- Wesleyanism
- United Methodist Church
