= Mount Olivet Cemetery (Baltimore) =

Cemetery in Baltimore, Maryland, US

Coordinates: 39°16′48.5″N 76°39′53.9″W

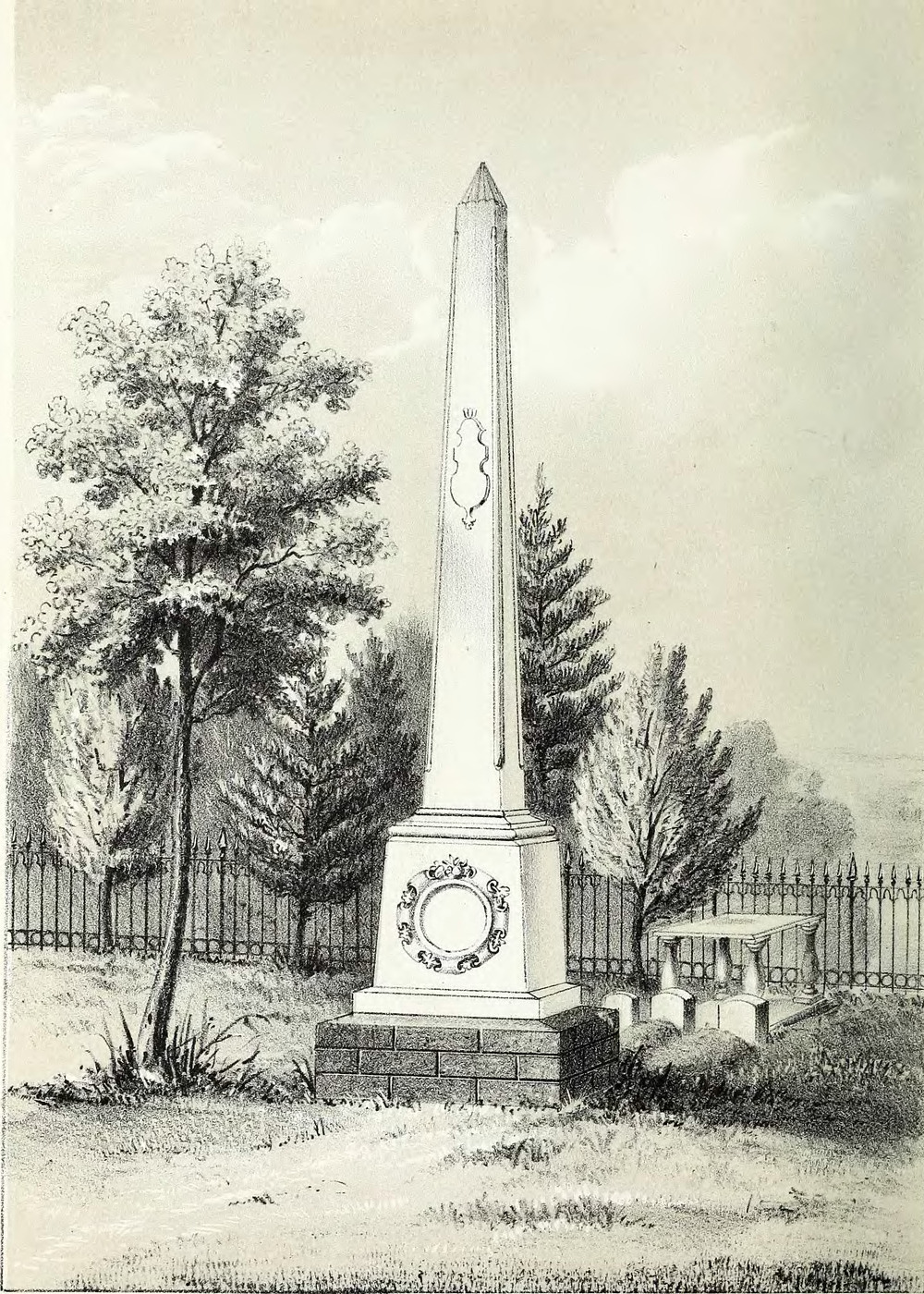
The "bishop's monument" in Mount Olivet Cemetery

Mount Olivet Cemetery in western Baltimore, Maryland is a historic burial ground dating back into the middle 1800s, known as "The Resting Place of Methodist Bishops."

Methodist Episcopal Church Bishops Francis Asbury, John Emory, Enoch George, and Beverly Waugh are all buried here, as well as Methodist leaders Jesse Lee, Robert Strawbridge, and missionaries E. Stanley Jones and Mabel Lossing Jones.

The cemetery has fallen victim to significant vandalism, with many grave monuments pushed over face-down from their bases, broken, or completely missing.

== Notable interments ==
- Annette Smith Burgess – medical illustrator
- Anna Mullikin (1893–1975), American PhD mathematician and early investigator of point set theory
