= Baltimore Female College =

Defunct private college for women in Baltimore, Maryland (1849–1890)

Baltimore Female College was a private college for women in Baltimore, Maryland, United States. Founded in 1849, it was the first institution of higher learning for women in Maryland. Nathan C. Brooks served as its president. It closed in 1890.

== History ==
Seventh Annual Report of the Trustees of the Baltimore Female College to the General Assembly of Maryland (1868), readable pdf

Baltimore Female College was affiliated with the Methodist Church. It was founded in 1849. It was one of the earliest female colleges in the United States, after Georgia Female College in Macon and LaGrange Female College in Georgia and Wesleyan Female College in Cincinnati, Ohio, and one of several that were founded around 1950, including Mary Sharp College in Winchester, Tennessee. Seminaries for women were also established in the first half of the 19th century.

Principal Rev. Beverly R. Waugh, son of Rev. Beverly Waugh, a Methodist Episcopal minister who spent most of his career in education, later went on to lead Pennsylvania Female College.

It was located on St. Paul Street. The college had collegiate and preparatory departments. Courses included languages, English, belle letters, drawing and painting, music, piano, guitar, vocal, natural sciences and mathematics. A normal department for teacher training was added. Annual reports were made to the General Assembly. The Fourth Annual Report includes information on faculty and the names of scholarship recipients.

It awarded medals. The college's annual catalogues also remain in existence.

== See also ==
- Women's colleges in the United States
- List of women's universities and colleges in the United States
- Eastern Female High School
