= John Emory =

American bishop (1789-1835)

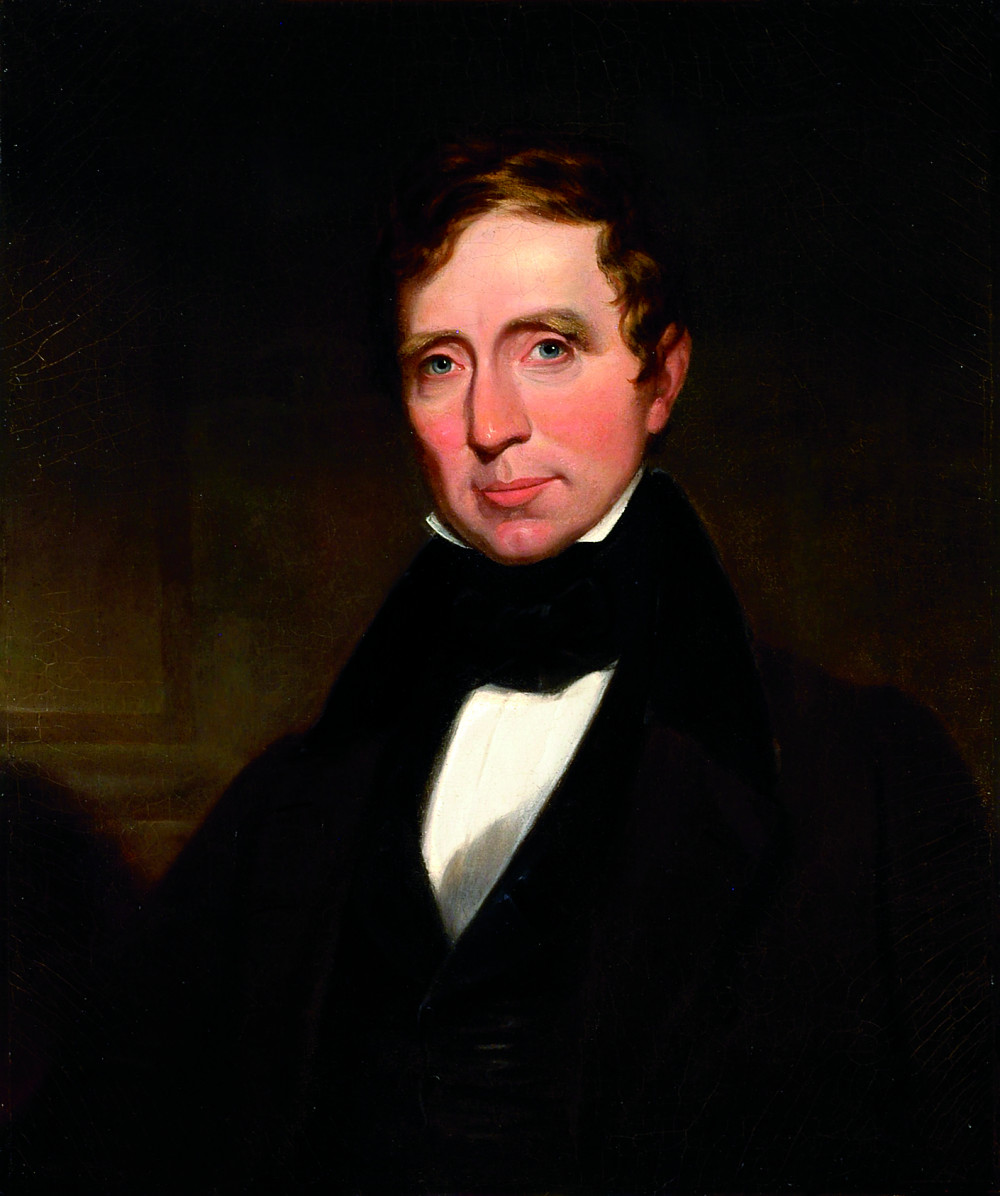
Bishop John Emory, by American painter George Esten Cooke (1793–1849). The painting is dated 1838 and is housed at Emory & Henry University in Emory, VA.

John Emory (April 11, 1789 – December 16, 1835) was an American bishop of the Methodist Episcopal Church, elected in 1832. He is the namesake for Emory University and Emory & Henry University, both Methodist-affiliated American universities.

== Early life and family ==
John was born at Spaniard's Neck, Queen Anne's County, Maryland. His parents were Methodists, his father a jurist who designed him for the law. His mother, however, who had been converted under Garrettson, devoted John at birth to the ministry. His eldest son Robert, born in 1814, became a professor of Latin and Greek at Dickinson College in 1836 and later its president. In 1841 he published a biography of his father, Life of the Rev. John Emory.

He was educated by tutors at Easton and Lancaster, Pennsylvania, and in Washington College, Chestertown, Maryland. He experienced "saving grace" at a Quarterly Meeting in 1806. He studied law in 1805 in the office of Judge R.T. Earle, Centreville, Maryland, and was admitted to the bar in 1808. But his attention soon turned to the pulpit, against his father's protests, and he entered the Traveling Ministry of the Philadelphia Annual Conference of the Methodist Episcopal Church in 1810.

== Ministry ==
Emory became well known, and his services were much in demand throughout the Middle States. He was elected a Member of the General Conference of 1816, and then to each succeeding General Conference (with one exception) through 1832 (when he was elected to the episcopacy). He was sent as a delegate to the British Wesleyan Conference in 1820. He was appointed Book Agent and Editor for the M.E. Church in 1824, with offices in New York City. While a bishop, he continued his interest in the Book Concern, and during his management thereof was successful in paying-off all its debts, returning it to a solid foundation.

He was especially active in promoting the improvement of the literature of the M. E. Church. For example, he founded the "Methodist Quarterly Review", nearly all the original articles in the first two volumes being from his own pen. He was prominent in the founding of New York University and of Wesleyan University, and was one of the principal organizers of Dickinson College as a Methodist school. He was an able debater. In 1817 in a pamphlet controversy, he used his literary weapons, not unsuccessfully, against Bishop White of the Protestant Episcopal Church. In the controversy of 1828 which led to the founding of the Methodist Protestant Church he was the chief defender of existing M.E. polity. He was of a logical turn of mind, and had command of a pure, clear, and vigorous style. As a bishop he was largely influential in giving the Methodist Episcopal Book of Discipline its present form.

== College and university namesakes ==
Bishop Emory died in an 1835 carriage accident near his Maryland home. (Note: Regarding the Bishop's death, Emory & Henry College publishes a webpage at the URL: http://www.ehcweb.ehc.edu/emory/johne.htm, which states: "The next year, on December 16, 1835, Bishop Emory was killed in a carriage accident, the brakes apparently failing on a long and steep hill." A dot com website named "Famousamericans" has a page which states: "EMORY, John, M. E. bishop, born in Queen Anne County, Maryland, 11 April 1789; died in Reisterstown, Maryland, 17 December 1835.") The next year, Methodists chartered both Emory College (later University) at Oxford, Georgia and Emory & Henry College (later University) in southwestern Virginia. (The co-eponym for the latter is Patrick Henry.) Both maintain their Methodist associations.

Bishop Emory is buried at Mount Olivet Cemetery in Baltimore near the graves of Bishops Francis Asbury and Beverly Waugh.

Emory United Methodist Church in New Oxford, PA, erected in 1887, was named for him after he helped to establish the Emory Sunday School during the church's early years - between 1832 and 1835.

University of the Pacific named one of the College Park neighborhood streets in San Jose "Emory Street" in his honor.

== See also ==
- List of bishops of the United Methodist Church

== Sources ==
- Leete, Frederick DeLand, Methodist Bishops. Parthenon Press, 1948.
- Border States: Journal of the Kentucky-Tennessee American Studies Association, No. 1, (1973). Methodist Bishops and Abolitionism, Fred J. Hood, Georgetown College.
