= Memphis Conference =

Conference of the United Methodist Church

Memphis Conference is a former Annual Conference of the United Methodist Church. It merged with the Tennessee Conference to form the Tennessee-Western Kentucky Conference on January 1, 2022. William T. McAlilly was the Resident Bishop, and also presides over the merged Conference.

== Districts ==
The Memphis Conference consisted of four districts and 398 churches in West Tennessee and the Jackson Purchase area of western Kentucky. The districts were Purchase, Mississippi River, Metro, and Tennessee River.

== See also ==
- Le Bonheur Children's Medical Center
