= Annette Smith Burgess =

American medical illustrator (1899–1962)

- Born: Annette Smith; 1899; Baltimore, Maryland, U.S.
- Died: August 1, 1962 (aged 62–63); Jackson, Mississippi, U.S.
- Resting place: Mount Olivet Cemetery; Baltimore, Maryland
- Education: Maryland Institute College of Art
- Occupation: Medical illustrator
- Employer: Johns Hopkins School of Medicine

Annette Smith Burgess (1899 – August 1, 1962) was an American medical illustrator and instructor at the Johns Hopkins School of Medicine.

== Early life ==
Annette Smith was born in Baltimore, Maryland, in 1899 to Richard Henry Smith and his wife. She attended public schools in Baltimore. She graduated from the Maryland Institute College of Art where she studied under Max Brödel. She attended Johns Hopkins University from 1923 to 1926.

== Career ==
In 1926, Burgess was hired by William Holland Wilmer to become the first ophthalmic illustrator and the first medical illustrator at the Wilmer Eye Institute at the Johns Hopkins School of Medicine. In 1948, she became an instructor of medical illustration at Johns Hopkins in its "Art as Applied to Medicine" program until she retired on July 1, 1961. Over her 35 year career, Burgess painted and drew practically all of the illustrations that appeared in medical publications of the work and research done at the Wilmer Eye Institute.

She made her illustrations using acetate sheets with an ophthalmoscope and slit lamp. She drew illustrations of eyes, particularly the fundus, including eyes infected with different diseases. These illustrations became internationally recognized because Burgess's illustrations were able to illuminate structures of the eye that photography could not; making it easier to educate and communicate research on diseases of the eye.

She was a charter member of the Association of Medical Illustrators. She was listed in the Who's Who of Women in America.

=== Selected works ===
She was the illustrator of the following publications:

- Wilmer Atlas of Fundi Occuli (1934), William Holland Wilmer
- Endogenous Uyeitis (1956), Alan C. Woods
- Endogenous Inflammations of the Uveal Tract (1961), Alan C. Woods

== Death ==
After moving to Jackson, Mississippi, in 1961, she died on August 1, 1962, at the University of Mississippi Hospital in Jackson. She was buried at Mount Olivet Cemetery in Baltimore.

== Legacy ==
The Department of Art as Applied to Medicine at Johns Hopkins established the Annette Burgess Award. The award has been presented since 1967.
