= Christmas Conference =

Founding conference of the Methodists within the US

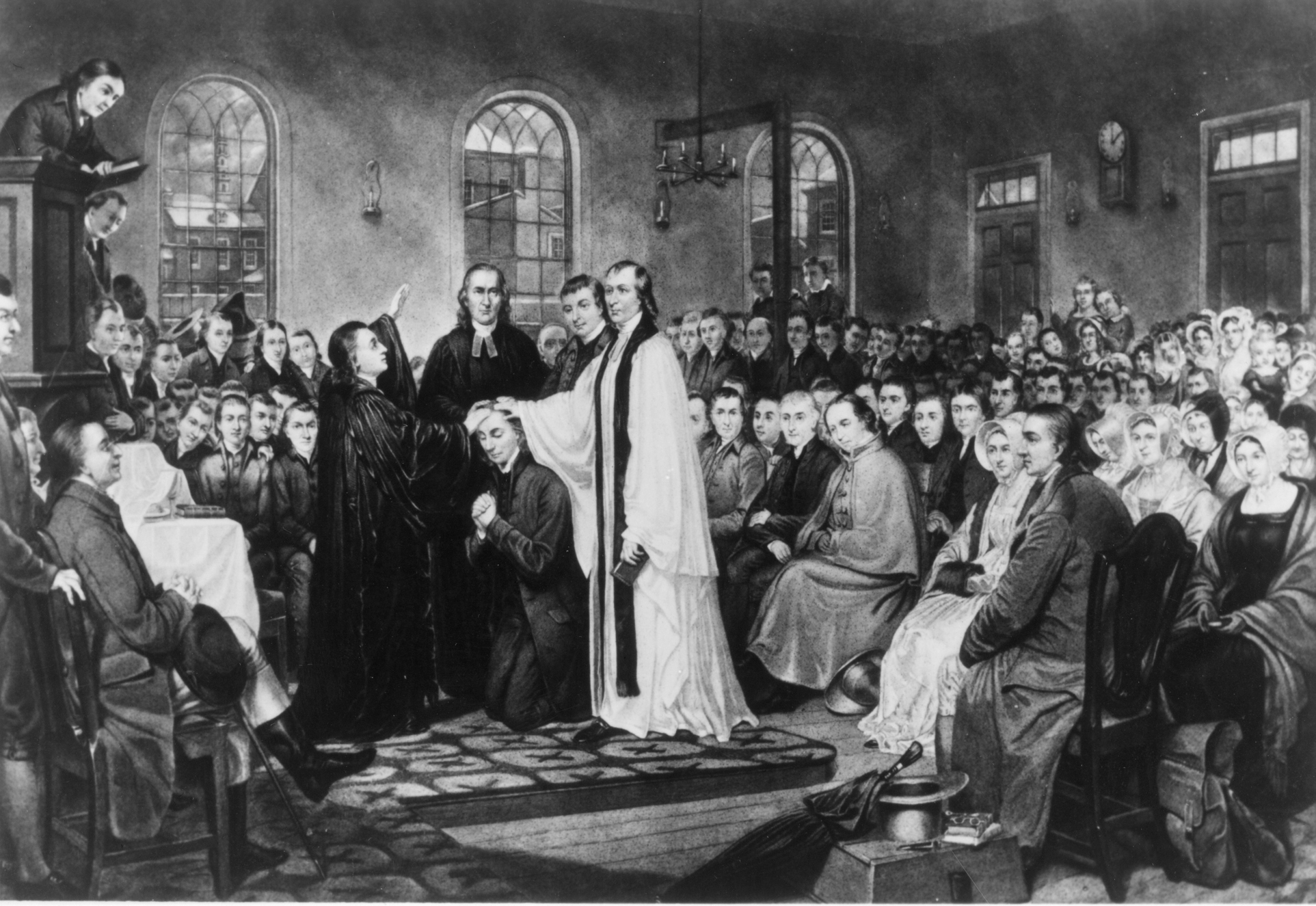
An engraving of an 1882 painting recreating Asbury's ordination as bishop at the Christmas Conference.

The Christmas Conference was a historic founding conference of the newly independent Methodists in the United States held just after the American Revolution at Lovely Lane Chapel in Baltimore, Maryland, in 1784.

== Background of Methodism in the United States ==
Prior to the revolution, American Methodism consisted of itinerant preachers commissioned by John Wesley the founder of the Methodist societies in England. Wesley had been sending preacher/missionaries since the 1760s. With the outbreak of war, most of these returned to England, with the exception of Francis Asbury and James Dempster. Asbury began to be looked upon as the leader of the groups, whereas Dempster moved to upstate New York, where he ministered locally. His activities were greatly restricted because, as an Englishman, he was suspected of not being sympathetic to the patriot cause. During the war, he ceased his circuit riding and stayed at the residence of his friend, Judge Thomas White of Delaware.

Before the war, the Methodist itinerant preachers were appointed to form societies, but they were expected by Wesley to work within the Anglican Church, as they were not ordained. They were not allowed to administer the sacraments. This produced some difficulty as Anglican Churches were limited to the coastal cities, and the itinerant preachers were moving westward and inland. Similarly, the Anglican clergy almost all left for England with the outbreak of war.

Asbury had come to America in 1771. Under his leadership, conferences were formed and American preachers appointed, but this did not solve the problem of the administration of the sacraments.

During the war, the societies continued to grow, albeit more slowly due to all the disruptions. Following the war, there was a move to locally ordain the preachers, but Asbury counselled patience until Wesley gave direction.

== Wesley's instructions ==
In England, at the Methodist Conference in Leeds in July 1784, Wesley himself ordained Richard Whatcoat and Thomas Vasey as elders, appointing them to go, along with a group of itinerant preachers to America. Wesley then ordained Thomas Coke (who was already an ordained Anglican priest) to go as superintendent of the American church. He gave Coke instructions to also ordain Francis Asbury as co-superintendent. Wesley was reluctant to take this action, but he had already asked for the Bishop of London to ordain a bishop for America, and had been rebuffed.

== Invitations and conference ==
Meeting with Asbury on November 14, 1784, Coke explained Wesley's intentions and proposed to ordain him. Asbury, catching the spirit of democracy in the new country, refrained from accepting the ordination until approved by the American connexion. Messengers were sent, calling the American itinerants to Baltimore on December 24. Eighty one preachers were entitled to membership; nearly sixty of them were able to arrive for the conference. During the six weeks while waiting for the conference, Coke and Asbury went on a preaching tour (on horseback) that covered at least 900 miles.

With the Christmas Conference's unanimous approval, Asbury was ordained and appointed as co-superintendent. He was ordained deacon on Christmas Day by laying on of hands; elder on the next day; and superintendent the next. Asbury's friend Philip William Otterbein, pastor of the German Reformed Church of Baltimore, also laid hands on Asbury to assist in the ordination.

Coke later said of Asbury, "In the presence of Mr. Asbury, I feel myself a child. He is in my estimation, the most apostolic man I ever saw, except Mr. Wesley." Coke preached Asbury's ordination sermon, which was later published and caused some stir in England because he emphasized the need to ordain only godly men, and pointed to England for an example of immoral and unconverted men to orders.

== Results and legacy ==
This conference, which became known as the first General Conference of the new church, abridged the 39 Articles of Religion of the Anglican Church into 24, added one additional article regarding civic duties as US citizens, and adopted these articles as its governing principles, also known as the Discipline. They also received a modified prayer book sent by Wesley.

John Dickins a pastor in New York proposed the name of the fledgeling church: the Methodist Episcopal Church.

The conference also ordained 12 preachers to orders, setting a precedent for the American church that ordinations were to be approved by the conference.

Immediately after the ten-day conference, Asbury set out circuit riding as he had before the war. His first destination was Charleston, South Carolina which he deemed the city most in need of spiritual enlightenment.

The American church held another General Conference in 1792 and every four years after.

== See also ==
- Richard Allen, later bishop of the African Methodist Episcopal Church, one of two non-voting black attendees at the conference
- "Black Harry" Hosier, the other

== Notes ==
=== External links ===
- The Asbury Triptych Series: book series on Francis Asbury and the Methodist movement. Christmas conference is found in Ordination, book three of the series.
