= Enoch George =

American Methodist circuit rider and pastor

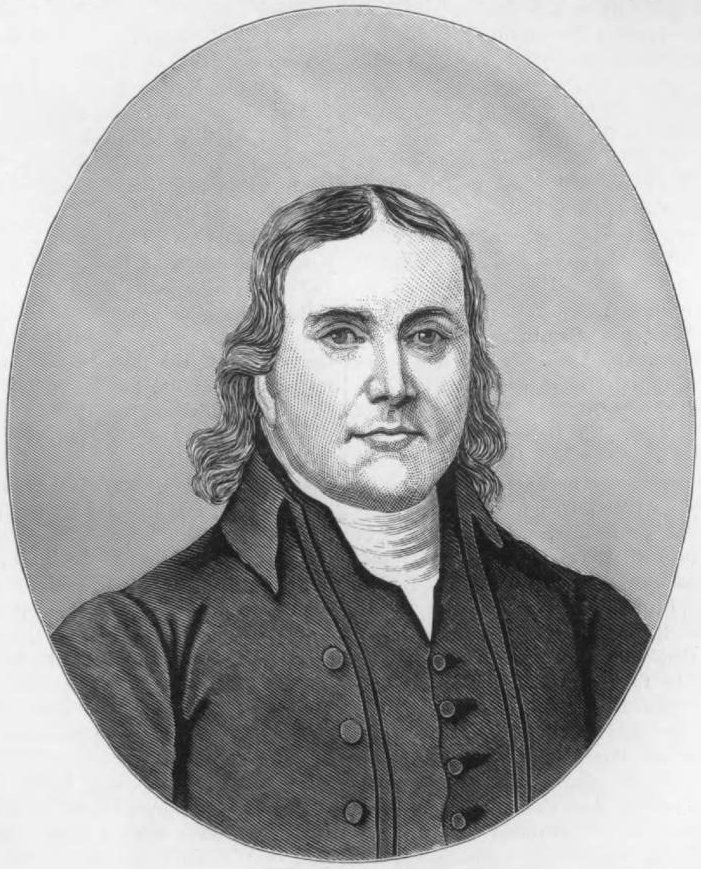
- Born: c. 1767; Lancaster County, Virginia
- Died: August 23, 1828; Staunton, Virginia
- Burial place: Mount Olivet Cemetery
- Occupation: Clergyman

Enoch George (c. 1767 – 1828) was an American who distinguished himself as a Methodist circuit rider and pastor, as a presiding elder, and as a bishop of the Methodist Episcopal Church, elected in 1816.

== Birth and spiritual re-birth ==
Enoch was born on March 10, 1767, or 1768 (his family records were destroyed by accident) in Lancaster County, Virginia. As a young person he was under the ministry of the Rev. Devereux Jarratt, a priest of the Church of England, who was one of the most earnest and effective preachers of his time. Enoch was the subject of deep religious impressions early in life. However, his father moved his family to a place where there happened to be no evangelical clergy, such that Enoch became negligent of his religious duties, neglecting the Christian ordinances altogether. After several years, his neighborhood was visited by a Methodist Circuit Rider John Easter, under whose exhortations young Enoch became connected with the little Methodist society established thereby, and again experienced the comforts of religion.

== Ordained ministry ==
Indeed, Enoch was soon called upon to the exercise of public prayer and exhortation. He soon thereafter entered the field of labor as a Preacher, though with great diffidence. The Rev. George was sent by Bishop Francis Asbury to assist in forming a circuit on the headwaters of the Catawba and Broad rivers, in North Carolina. The difficulties were so great there that Enoch wrote Bishop Asbury asking for a transfer to some other field. The good bishop replied that "it was better for him to become inured to hardships while he was young, that when he was old and gray-headed his task would be easy."

In 1790 the Rev. Enoch George was admitted on trial by the Virginia Annual Conference of the M.E. Church. He was ordained, both Deacon and Elder, by Bishop Asbury. Rev. George served for two years as the Junior Preacher on the Caswell Circuit. He then went to South Carolina, where in 1796 he was appointed Presiding Elder of the Charleston District. In 1798, because of impaired health, he temporarily retired from the active work of ministry and traveled to the North. But in 1800 he resumed his labors, and was appointed Presiding Elder of the Potomac District in the Baltimore Annual Conference.

The Rev. George's health failed a second time, and he "located". But again, in 1803, he resumed the work this time with great zeal and success. He was stationed, successively, in Baltimore, Alexandria, and Georgetown, then on the Baltimore and then the Georgetown Districts (as Presiding Elder)

== The preacher ==
Enoch George belonged to the "primitive" school of American Methodist preachers. Though many of these had little or no scholastic advantages, yet some became highly effective preachers of the Gospel, also attaining proficiency in Biblical and theological learning. George was especially distinguished for the fervor and pathos of his pulpit ministry.

== Episcopal ministry ==
After the death of Bishop Asbury, the Rev. Enoch George was elected and consecrated a Bishop of the M.E. Church by the General Conference, May 1816. He served with great zeal and effectiveness for the remaining twelve years of his life. He traveled, chiefly by private conveyance, through all parts of the country. He went as far as the frontier settlements of the west and southwest, usually preaching nearly every day at prearranged appointments. Remarkable manifestations of the influence that attended his preaching were regularly witnessed.

== Physical description ==
Bishop Matthew Simpson wrote of him:

He was a man of deep piety, of great simplicity of manners, a pathetic, powerful and successful preacher, greatly beloved in life, and very extensively lamented in death.

== Death and burial ==
Bishop Enoch George died August 23, 1828, in Staunton, Virginia, and was buried in Mount Olivet Cemetery in Baltimore.

== See also ==
- List of bishops of the United Methodist Church
