= Christopher Rush (bishop) =

Bishop of the AME Zion Church (1777–1873)

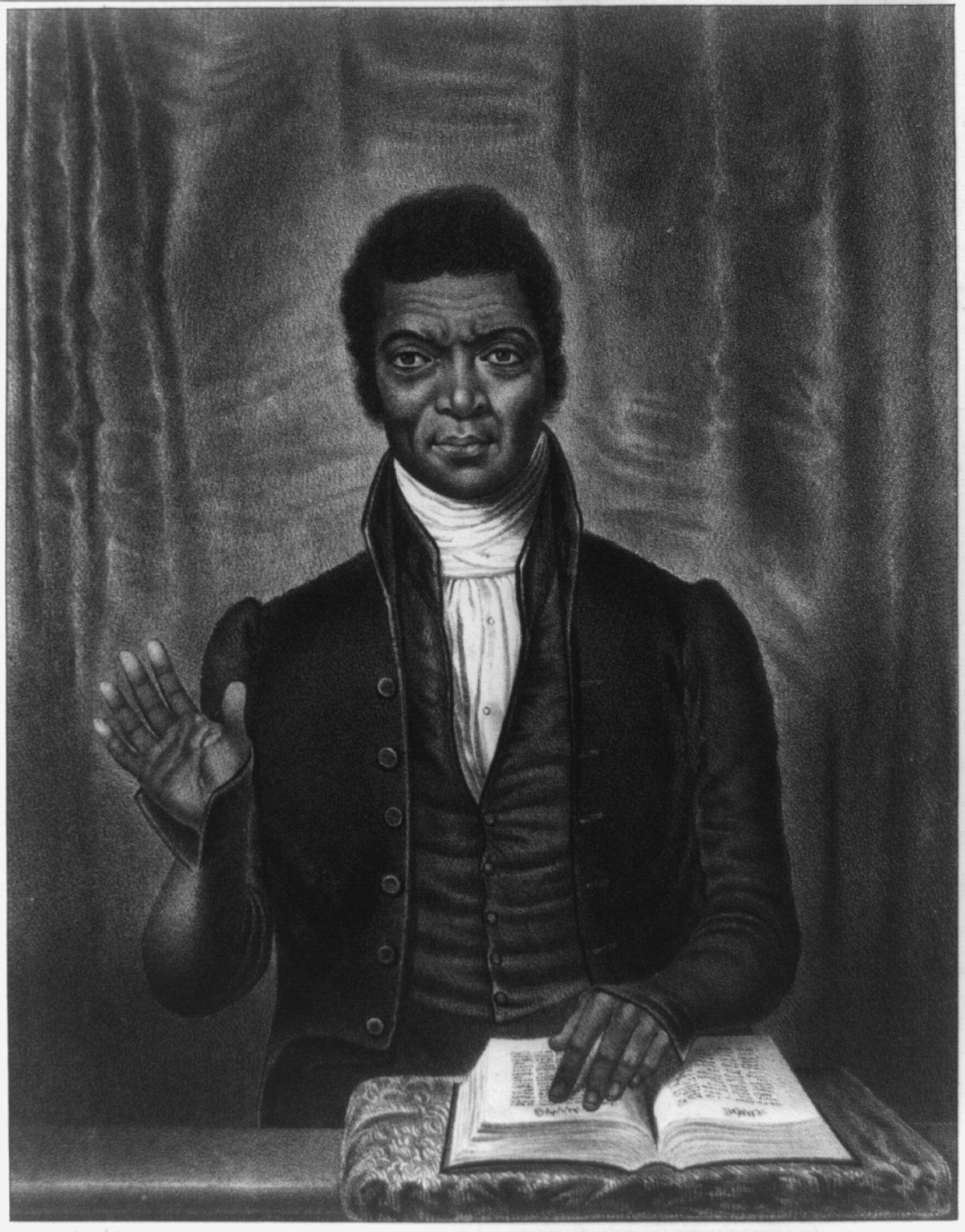
Half-length portrait, facing front, with right hand raised and left hand resting on an open bible (1840)

Christopher Rush (1777–1873) was a bishop of the African Methodist Episcopal Zion Church.

== Life ==
Christopher Rush, born in Craven County, North Carolina, in 1777, was a full-blooded African, and born a slave. He went to New York in 1798, and was subsequently freed. He was licensed to preach in the Methodist Episcopal Church in 1815, and he received his ordination in 1822. He was ordained a superintendent or bishop on May 18, 1828. He was largely instrumental in the separation of the black from the white branch of the Methodist Church, and his address before Bishop Enoch George finally carried the measure, and he was thus a founder of what became the African Methodist Episcopal Zion Church. At that time the African Methodists numbered only one hundred, but Bishop Rush lived to see it a comparatively large and flourishing organization.

== Works ==
He published a history of his denomination, entitled A Short Account of the Rise and Progress of the African Methodist Episcopal Church in America (New York, 1843).

== Sources ==
- Ruffle, Karen (2017). "Christopher Rush, 1777-1873". Documenting the American South. The University of North Carolina at Chapel Hill. Retrieved August 18, 2022.
