= James Dempster (footballer) =

Scottish footballer

Personal information
- Full name: James Barclay Dempster
- Date of birth: 30 January 1896
- Place of birth: Newarthill, Scotland
- Date of death: 1957 (aged 60–61)
- Height: 5 ft 9 in (1.75 m)
- Position: Goalkeeper

Senior career*
Years	Team	Apps	(Gls)
1918–1919	Newarthill Thistle		
1919–1922	Sunderland	40	(0)
1922–1923	Airdrieonians		
1923–1926	St Johnstone		
1926–1927	Dundee United		
1927–1928	Bo'ness		
1928–1929	Bathgate		
1929–19??	Bo'ness		
- * Club domestic league appearances and goals

James Barclay Dempster (30 January 1896 – 1957) was a Scottish professional footballer who played as a goalkeeper for Sunderland. He also played for Airdrieonians, St Johnstone, Dundee United, Bo'ness and Bathgate.
