= John Dickins =

English-born Methodist preacher (1746–1798)

The Reverend John Dickins
- Born: 1746; London, England
- Died: September 27, 1798 (aged 51–52); Philadelphia, Pennsylvania, U.S.
- Education: Eton College
- Occupation: Preacher
- Known for: Being a founder member and the person who suggested the name of the Methodist Episcopal Church

John Dickins (1746 — September 27, 1798) was an early Methodist preacher in the United States. Born in London in 1746 and educated at Eton College, he came to America and was appointed a Methodist preacher in 1774. He served circuits in Virginia and North Carolina, then went to New York in 1784. He was one of the founding members of the Methodist Episcopal Church (actually it was he who suggested the name) at the Christmas Conference in Baltimore in 1784. He had been one of the greeters of Thomas Coke who had arrived as Wesley's emissary to the new American Church.

In 1789 he set up the Methodist Book Concern with $600 of his own money and began to publish books and other literature.

Methodist circuit riders from then on carried his materials on their travels and distributed them widely. His first book was Christian Pattern by Thomas à Kempis. He also published the Methodist hymn book, the Arminian Magazine and later The Methodist Magazine.

In time his publishing concern grew into The Methodist Publishing House, which in the mid-twentieth century was the largest religious publishing house in the world.

As the principal provider of literature for the growing Methodist movement, he must take a significant amount of credit for its growth into the largest American church by the mid 20th century.
