= James Dempster (Methodist) =

Scottish clergyman (1740–1804)

James Dempster (1740–1804) was a Methodist clergyman who ministered to members of the Methodist Societies in the American colonies before and during the American Revolution.

He was born in Edon, Scotland on 21 September 1740, the third son of William and Violet Dempster of Newton, West Lothian. His grandfather, James Ker, had been a member of the British Parliament, serving the Edinburgh constituency. He studied at Edinburgh University.

Between 1768 and 1774, John Wesley sent Francis Asbury and seven other Methodist lay preachers to the colonies, Dempster being one of them. It is thought his arrival would have been in 1774. On the outbreak of the Revolutionary War, Dempster and Asbury chose to remain in America while the others returned to England. Asbury remained active as a minister, but due to the hostility shown towards British ministers, Dempster elected to withdraw from prominent ministry and settled on a farm in the Mohawk Valley of upstate New York, where he remained for the rest of his life. He established a log meeting house church at Warrensbush (now Florida Township), southwest of Amsterdam in Montgomery County, believed to have been erected in 1778, and acted as an itinerant preacher and minister in the Tryon, Schenectady, Albany, Saratoga, Washington and Rensselaer sections of Upstate New York. He maintained a record of the marriages and baptisms which he performed, which has since been published.

Dempster married and had three sons, James, John, Joel, and a daughter Pamelia. John Dempster became a Methodist missionary in Argentina and later helped to found Boston University School of Theology and Garrett Biblical Institute (now Garrett-Evangelical Theological Seminary) in Evanston, Illinois.

James Dempster died in Florida, New York on 10 May 1804.
