= Francis Asbury =

Methodist minister and bishop in America (1745–1816)

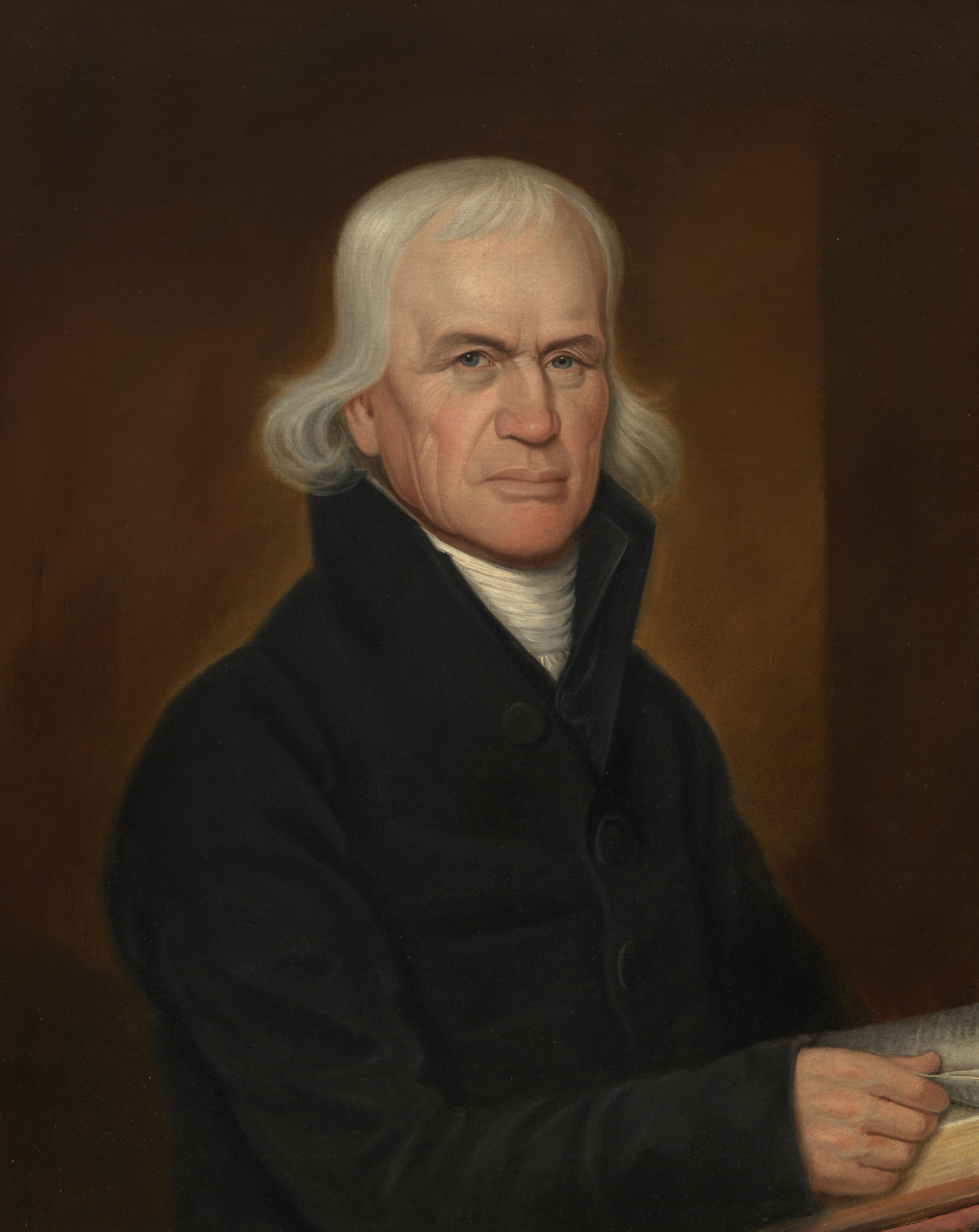
- Portrait by John Paradise, c. 1813
- Born: August 20 or 21, 1745; Hamstead Bridge, Staffordshire, England
- Died: March 31, 1816 (aged 70); Spotsylvania County, Virginia, U.S.
- Occupations: Minister, theologian
- Known for: Helped found the Methodist church and spread it in America as a Circuit Rider

Francis Asbury (August 20 or 21, 1745 – March 31, 1816) was a British-American Methodist minister who became one of the first two bishops of the Methodist Episcopal Church in the United States. During his 45 years in the colonies and the newly independent United States, he devoted his life to ministry, traveling on horseback and by carriage thousands of miles to those living on the frontier.

Asbury spread Methodism in British colonial America and the United States as part of the Second Great Awakening. He also founded several schools during his lifetime, although his own formal education was limited. His journal is valuable to scholars for its account of frontier society, with references to many towns and villages in Colonial America. Along with John and Charles Wesley, Asbury is often celebrated as one of the founders of the Methodism in the United States.

== Biography ==
=== Childhood and adolescence ===
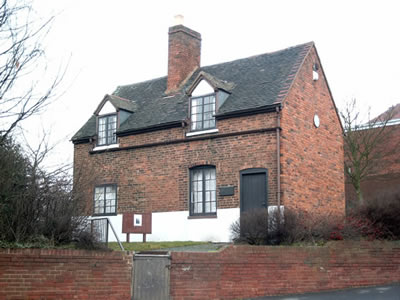
Bishop Asbury Cottage, Asbury's boyhood home at Great Barr

Francis Asbury was born at Hamstead Bridge, Staffordshire, England on August 20 or 21, 1745, to Elizabeth and Joseph Asbury. The family moved to a cottage at Great Barr the next year. His boyhood home still stands and is open as Bishop Asbury Cottage museum.

Soon after the family moved to Great Barr, in May 1748, Asbury's older sister, Sarah, died; he was less than three years old. Asbury wrote later that his mother Eliza was "very much a woman of the world"; with his sister's death, she "sank into deep distress....from which she was not relieved for many years," and was living "in a very, dark, dark, dark, day and place". A few years later she found a renewed Christian faith as itinerant preachers, either Baptist or Methodists, visited Barr on a revival circuit. From then on she began to read the Bible every day and encouraged her son to do so as well.

Eliza's deep faith may not have been shared by her husband, who seemed to have problems, possibly drink or gambling. Francis Asbury described his father as "industrious." The husband supported his wife in her faith and witness: he allowed Methodist meetings to be held each Sunday in the cottage.

During Asbury's childhood the West Midlands was undergoing massive changes as the industrial revolution swept through the area. Waves of workers migrated into the area, attracted by jobs in the growing factories and workshops in Birmingham and the mines of the Black Country. The Asburys lived in a cottage tied to a public house, on a main route between the mines and the factories. They would have been aware of the drinking, gambling, poverty and poor behaviour prevalent in the area.

Francis Asbury attended a local endowed school in Snail's Green, a nearby hamlet. He did not get on well with his fellow pupils who ridiculed him because of his mother's religious beliefs. During the 1740s there had been widespread anti-Methodist rioting in Wednesbury and the surrounding area, and into the 1750s a great deal of persecution. Nor did he like his teacher and left school at the first opportunity.

Asbury took a keen interest in religion, having "felt something of God as early as the age of seven". He lived not far from All Saints' Church, West Bromwich, which under the patronage of the Methodist Earl of Dartmouth, provided a living for Evangelical minister Edward Stillinghurst. Well connected, Stillinghurst invited as visiting preachers some of the foremost preachers and theologians of the day. These included John Fletcher, John Ryland, Henry Venn, John Cennick and Benjamin Ingham. His mother encouraged Francis to meet with the Methodists in Wednesbury, eventually joining a "band" with four other young men who would meet and pray together. For them a typical Sunday would be a preaching meeting at 5.00 am, communion at the parish church mid morning, and attending a preaching meeting again at 5.00 pm.

Asbury had his first formal job at age thirteen; he went "into service" for local gentry, whom he later described as "one of the most unGodly families in the parish" but he soon left them and is believed to have eventually worked for Thomas Foxall, at the Old Forge Farm, where he made metal goods. He became great friends with Foxall's son, Henry. They developed a friendship, which continued after Henry Foxall's emigration to Colonial America. There he continued working with metal and established the Foundry Church in Georgetown, now part of Washington, D.C.

Asbury began to preach locally, and eventually became an itinerant preacher on behalf of the Methodist cause.

Asbury's preaching ministry in England is detailed in the section below: "Asbury's circuits in England".

=== Asbury's work in America ===
At the age of 22, Asbury's selection by John Wesley as a traveling lay preacher became official. Typically such positions were held by young, unmarried men, known as exhorters. In 1771 Asbury volunteered to travel to British North America. His first sermon in the Colonies took place with the Methodist congregation in Woodrow, Staten Island. Within the first 17 days of being in the colonies, Asbury preached in both Philadelphia and New York City. During the first year, he served as Wesley's assistant and preached in 25 different settlements. When the American Revolutionary War broke out in 1775, he and James Dempster were the only British Methodist lay ministers to remain in America.

"During his early years in North America, Asbury devoted his attention mainly to followers living on the eastern shore between the Delaware River and the Chesapeake Bay. Bishop Asbury was a good friend of the Melsons and was their guest many times on his rounds. When the American revolution severed the traditional ties between the American Thirteen Colonies and Great Britain, Bishop Asbury, in the interest of his religious tenets and principles and in an attempt to remain aloof from the political and military fervor that swept the country, announced he would, to keep the embryonic Methodist congregations neutral, refrain from endorsing either Great Britain or the newly formed United States of America government and urged all his followers to do the same. This request placed almost all of his followers, especially those living in Maryland, in an untenable position. The State of Maryland had enacted a law requiring all citizens to take an Oath of Allegiance to the newly formed American Congress. In addition to this, it stipulated all non-residents within its boundaries also had to take and sign an Oath of Allegiance. Those refusing were summarily incarcerated for treason. Asbury, after proclaiming his neutrality, fled to Delaware, where taking an oath of allegiance was not a requirement. His adherents in Maryland suffered the rancor of the proponents of the Oath."

Asbury remained hidden during the war and ventured occasionally back into Maryland. Sometimes this had the effect of compromising his parishioners. Asbury did not become ordained or a bishop until December 1784.

Asbury taught that “slavery was a crime against the laws of God, man, and nature”. In 1780, Asbury met the freedman Henry "Black Harry" Hosier, a meeting the minister believed "providentially arranged". Hosier served as his driver and guide and, though illiterate, memorized long passages of the Bible as Asbury read them aloud during their travels. Hosier eventually became a famous preacher in his own right, the first African American to preach directly to a white congregation in the United States. Under Asbury's influence Methodists made African-Americans a special target for missionary work, leading to a large number of converts; and by 1800 nearly 20,000 African-Americans were Methodists, about one third of the overall Methodist population in America.

=== A camp meeting ===
In the fall of 1800, Asbury attended one of the events of the Revival of 1800 as he travelled from Kentucky into Tennessee. The combined Presbyterian and Methodist communion observance made a deep impression on Asbury; it was as an early experience for him of multi-day meetings, which included attendees camping on the grounds or sleeping in their wagons around the meeting house. He recorded the events in his journal: it showed the relation between religious revivalism and camp meetings, later a staple of nineteenth-century frontier Methodism.

=== Ordained and consecrated a bishop ===
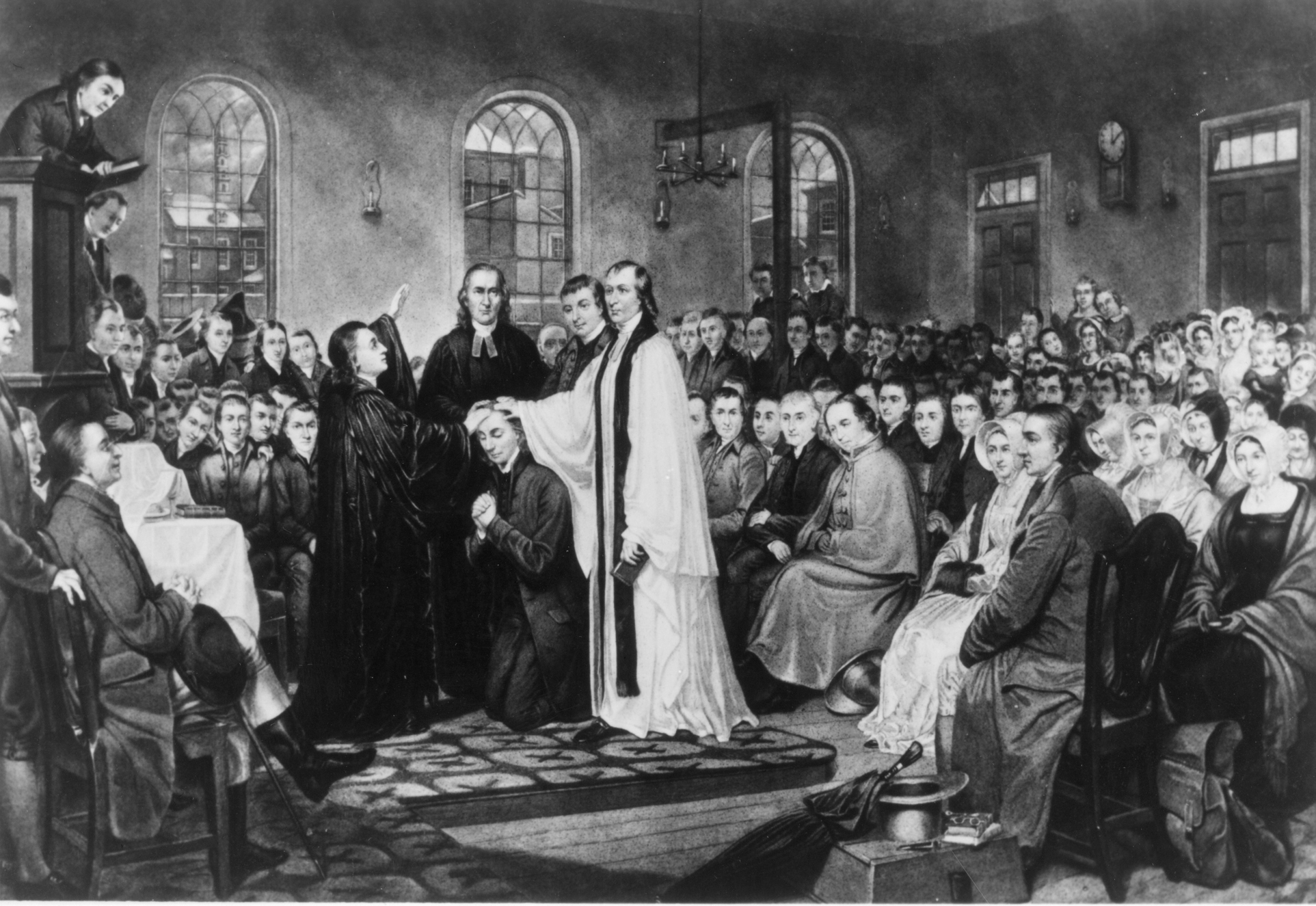
The Ordination of Bishop Asbury, an engraving of an 1882 painting of the scene

In 1784, John Wesley named Asbury and Thomas Coke as co-superintendents of the work in the United States. The Christmas Conference that year marked the beginning of the Methodist Episcopal Church of the United States. It was during this Conference that Asbury was ordained by Coke.

For the next 32 years, Asbury led all the Methodists in America. However, his leadership did not go unchallenged. His idea for a ruling council was opposed by such notables as William McKendree, Jesse Lee, and James O'Kelly. Eventually, based on advice by Coke, he established in 1792 a General Conference, to which delegates could be sent, as a way of building broader support.

=== His journeys ===
Like Wesley, Asbury preached in myriad of places: courthouses, public houses, tobacco houses, fields, public squares, wherever a crowd assembled to hear him. For the remainder of his life, he rode an average of 6,000 miles each year, preaching virtually every day and conducting meetings and conferences. Under his direction, the church grew from 1,200 to 214,000 members and 700 ordained preachers. Among the men he ordained was Richard Allen in Philadelphia, the first black Methodist minister in the United States who later founded the African Methodist Episcopal Church, the first independent black denomination in the country. Another African American was Daniel Coker, who emigrated to Sierra Leone in 1820 and became the first Methodist minister there from the West. Bishop Asbury also ordained Peter Cartwright in the fall of 1806.

=== Failing health and death ===
In 1813, Asbury wrote his will. This was a time when "the greatest membership gain in the history of the church" was achieved. In 1814 his health started to fail and he became ill. In 1816 he started to regain strength and continued his preaching journey. He "preached his last Sermon in Richmond, Virginia" on March 24, "and died at the home of George Arnold near Fredericksburg" on March 31.

Bishop Asbury died in Spotsylvania County, Virginia. He was buried at Mount Olivet Cemetery, in Baltimore, near the graves of Bishops John Emory and Beverly Waugh.

=== Ability as a preacher ===
In an exciting time in American history, Asbury was reported to be an extraordinary preacher. Biographer Ezra Squier Tipple wrote: "If to speak with authority as the accredited messenger of God; to have credentials which bear the seal of heaven ... if when he lifted the trumpet to his lips the Almighty blew the blast; if to be conscious of an ever-present sense of God, God the Summoner, God the Anointing One, God the Judge, and to project it into speech which would make his hearers tremble, melt them with terror, and cause them to fall as dead men; if to be and do all this would entitle a man to be called a great preacher, then Asbury was a great preacher."

== Personal habits ==
"Francis Asbury had a great distrust of personal popularity, and equally marked distaste of personal publicity". Not being a vain person, he did not care to have his image preserved. He had been in America for 23 years, and a bishop for 10 years before he had let a portrait be made of him. His friend James McCannon persuaded him to have it done. Asbury had had a portrait painted of him for his mother in 1797. His last portrait was made in 1813 by an unknown artist in Strasburgh, Pennsylvania.

Asbury had times when he tended to have gloomy thoughts and opinions. He believed himself to be "a true prophet of evil tidings, as it suits my cast of mind". Although he was pessimistic, those who knew him considered him an extremely sensitive person. In his journal he recorded more failures and misgivings than success in his ministry. He loved simplicity and had "frequent spells of morbid depression". He tended to use cynical sarcasm in his preachings. One of the typical prayers he would say, even on his way to America, was "Lord, we are in thy hands and in thy work. Thou knowest what is best of us and for thy work; whether plenty or poverty. The hearts of all men are in thy hands. If it is best for us and for thy church that we should be cramped and straitened, let the people's hands and hearts be closed: If it is better for us; for the church,—and more to thy glory that we should abound in the comforts of life; do thou dispose the hearts of those we serve to give accordingly: and may we learn to be content whether we abound, or suffer need".

He rose at 5 every morning to read the Bible. He was impatient with those who did not do the tasks assigned to them as soon as the task was assigned. He was "one of the wisest and most farseeing men of his day".

== His journal ==
On September 4, 1771, at the age of 26, Francis Asbury began his journey to Philadelphia from Pill near Bristol, England. "It cost him much to leave home and kindred, as is witnessed by his affectionate letters and sacrificial remittances home: but the call of God was not to be denied". Before he left, he wrote a letter to his family. "I wonder sometimes how anyone will sit to hear me, but the Lord covers my weakness with his power…. I trust you will be easy and more quiet. As for me, I know what I am called to. It is to give up all, and to have my hands and heart in the work, yea, the nearest and dearest friends…. Let others condemn me as being without natural affection, disobedient to parents, or say what they please…. I love my parents and friends, but I love my God better and his service…. And tho' I have given up all, I do not repent, for I have found all". On this voyage he began a journal. "In his journal he pours out the feelings and impulses of the moment, but often without giving a clue to either the offender or the offense". He became seasick for the first week but had recovered. He was "poor in material things, but rich in the spiritual atmosphere created and maintained by his mother". He also spent a lot of time studying and reading the Bible and books written by Wesley. On September 22, September 29, and October 6, he preached to the ship's company. Finally, on October 27, he landed at his destination in Philadelphia. His journal also contains some references to opinions of ministers who disagreed with the Methodist leadership, such as Rev. Charles Hopkins of Powhatan County, Virginia who had rejected the Methodist ideals several years before.

His journal also frequently mentioned Thomas S. Hinde who was the son of Dr. Thomas Hinde and founder of the city of Mount Carmel, Illinois.

== Asbury's circuits in England ==
Asbury's travels in America are amply noted in his three-volume journal, The Journal and Letters of Francis Asbury. However, his travels in England are much harder to piece together as very little information exists. John Wiggers provide some details in American Saint, his biography on Asbury.

Around 1763, Asbury began leading the class of about two dozen faithful at the West Bromwich Wesleyan society. In March 1765, his mentor, Wesleyan Alexander Mather asked Asbury to assist him. For the next 11 months, the twenty-year-old Asbury taught and preached around the Staffordshire circuit. The circuit consisted of small Wesleyan societies in West Bromwich, Wednesbury, Walsall, Wolverhampton, and Bilbrook. These areas were the foundation of Methodism in the Black Country. During this initial phase of his circuits around England, two Wesleyan preachers offered the majority of the young preachers mentoring. The first was the already mentioned Scottish itinerant, Mather. The second was an English preacher from Bedfordshire, James Glasbrook. These two taught Asbury John Wesley's basic requirements for a Wesleyan itinerant preacher.

In January 1766, Mather offered him the opportunity to quit the forge and join the Wesleyan movement as a full-time itinerant on a trial basis. The twenty-one-year-old Asbury accepted. Part of his training as a full-time traveling preacher required that he read extensively from books suggested by Wesley, who made them available in London, Bristol and Newcastle. The list included several Divinity Books: the Bible, Wesley's tracts, the works of Boehm and Francke. There were also books on natural philosophy, astronomy, history, poetry, Latin and Greek prose and verse—including the Greek New Testament and Homer's Iliad—and the Hebrew Bible.

For the next five months, during his circuits in England Asbury teamed with William Orpe, a young preacher who was the Hebrew teacher at Wesley's Kingswood School in Bristol. They covered the large Staffordshire circuit that encompassed not only Birmingham, Wolverhampton, Willenhall, Walsall, Wednesbury, Darlaston and Bilbrook, but also an extended portion to the south in Worcestershire and Tewkesbury, Gloucestershire. Despite his happiness with his new career, Asbury struggled with a sense that his efforts were somewhat limited. He was still living with his parents, he was preaching in places that had heard him preach for the last five years. He looked for more travel and more responsibility.

Asbury pressed Mather to assign Asbury to the low round of the Staffordshire circuit, and found it more grueling than he had anticipated. After twelve months Mather sent him home for a short break. Asbury then received instructions to head for London. The London conference of 1767 assigned Asbury to the Bedfordshire circuit.

In London, it is likely that Asbury met George Whitefield when he attended worship at Whitefield's Tabernacle. At the time of Asbury's arrival in London, Benjamin Franklin was staying in London and a guest of his friend Whitefield, whom he had met years earlier during one of Whitefield's trips to America. Along with Franklin at Whitefield's home were Connecticut colonial leaders including a Mohegan Indian named Samson Occum and his traveling companion, Princeton College Presbyterian minister, Nathaniel Whitaker, Lord Dartmouth, and the merchant Dennis De Bert. Occum and Whitaker were in England to raise money for their Indian Charity School in Lebanon, Connecticut. Spending a couple months in London before the August conference, it is likely that Asbury not only heard Samson Occum speak at The Tabernacle, but also had opportunity to meet this unique group.

August 18, 1767 the conference in London began at John and Charles Wesley's Foundry Church. At this conference, Wesley assigned Asbury to the sprawling Bedfordshire circuit. In addition to Bedfordshire, Asbury was officially admitted on trial and teamed with Bedfordshire native, James Glasbrook. The main locations were Hertford, Luton, Sundon, Millbrook, Bedford, Clifton and Northampton. It was a rural circuit made up of small societies whose total membership was just 208 people.

In lieu of attending the 1768 conference in Bristol, Asbury was given instructions to await his next assignment in London. Asbury's short stopover in London occurred at the same time that Benjamin Rush was staying with George Whitefield, having completed his medical studies in Edinburgh. After the Bristol conference in August 1768, Wesley assigned Asbury to the only circuit more difficult than the Staffordshire low Round, Colchester. Asbury would preach along the southern coastline of the River Stour, from Manningtree to Harwich. As beautiful as the scenery was, the area soured with rampant smuggling. Asbury was to preach against smuggling.

Perhaps out of worry for the young itinerant and the dangerous territory he travelled, after two months on the Colchester circuit, Asbury received word to relocate to the Wiltshire circuit. The three main cities of the Wiltshire circuit are Salisbury, Winchester and Portsmouth. In Portsmouth, it is likely that Asbury began his study of Hebrew through the large Jewish settlement that coexisted with the Portsmouth Methodists. In Portsmouth, the majority of the Jewish settlers resided in Portsea, also known as Portsmouth Common, the same area as the Methodists. For the next ten months, he remained on the Wiltshire circuit.

August 10, 1769, word from the Leeds Conference arrived for Asbury in Salisbury. Word from Wesley was that the next circuit was Oxfordshire. There he teamed up with his friend from Staffordshire, Richard Whatcoat. In Oxford, Asbury and Whatcoat occasionally preached from St Giles Church. Asbury and Whatcoat remained in Oxford until Christmas. They were both assigned to preach the Bedfordshire circuit in the new year. In addition to returning to Northampton, Asbury would travel to the smaller Wesleyan societies in Towcester and Whittlebury. He also spent time in Weedon. For the next eight months, Asbury would preach on the western portion of the Bedfordshire circuit.

In March 1770, Wesley preached at West Bromwich. The news of Wesley drew Asbury to return home after nearly three years away. After his visit home, Asbury returned to the western portion of the Bedfordshire circuit. After the 1770 conference Wesley once again assigned Asbury to Wiltshire. It was during this assignment Asbury was abandoned by his assigned helper, John Catermole, who left the Wiltshire circuit after his dealing with a disorderly lay leader who threatened violence to Catermole and Asbury. A visit by Wesley to the struggling Wiltshire circuit resulted in Wesley asking Asbury to visit the Isle of Wight. It was at the August 1771 conference in Bristol where Asbury volunteered for the circuit simply called, America.

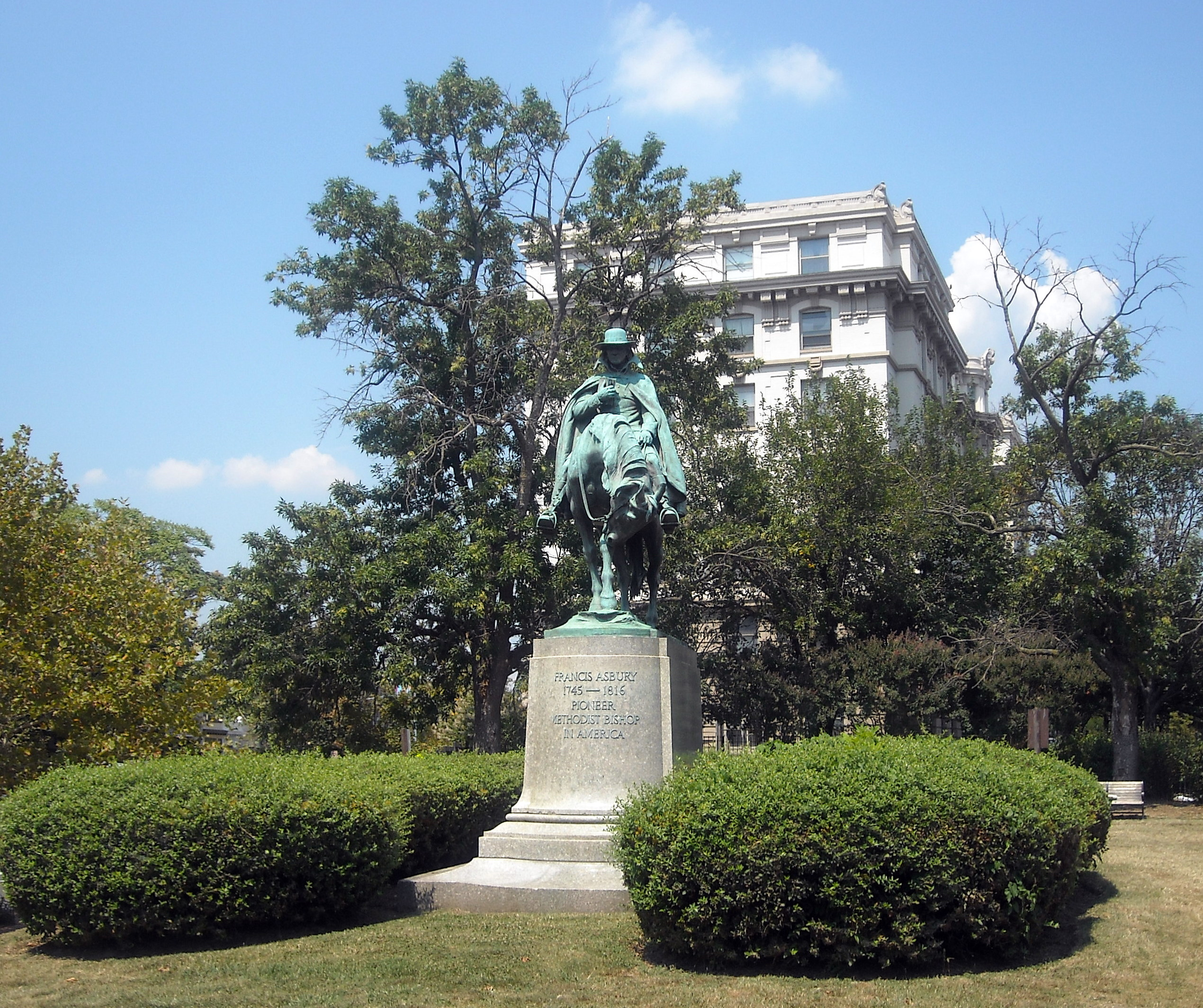
Francis Asbury Memorial

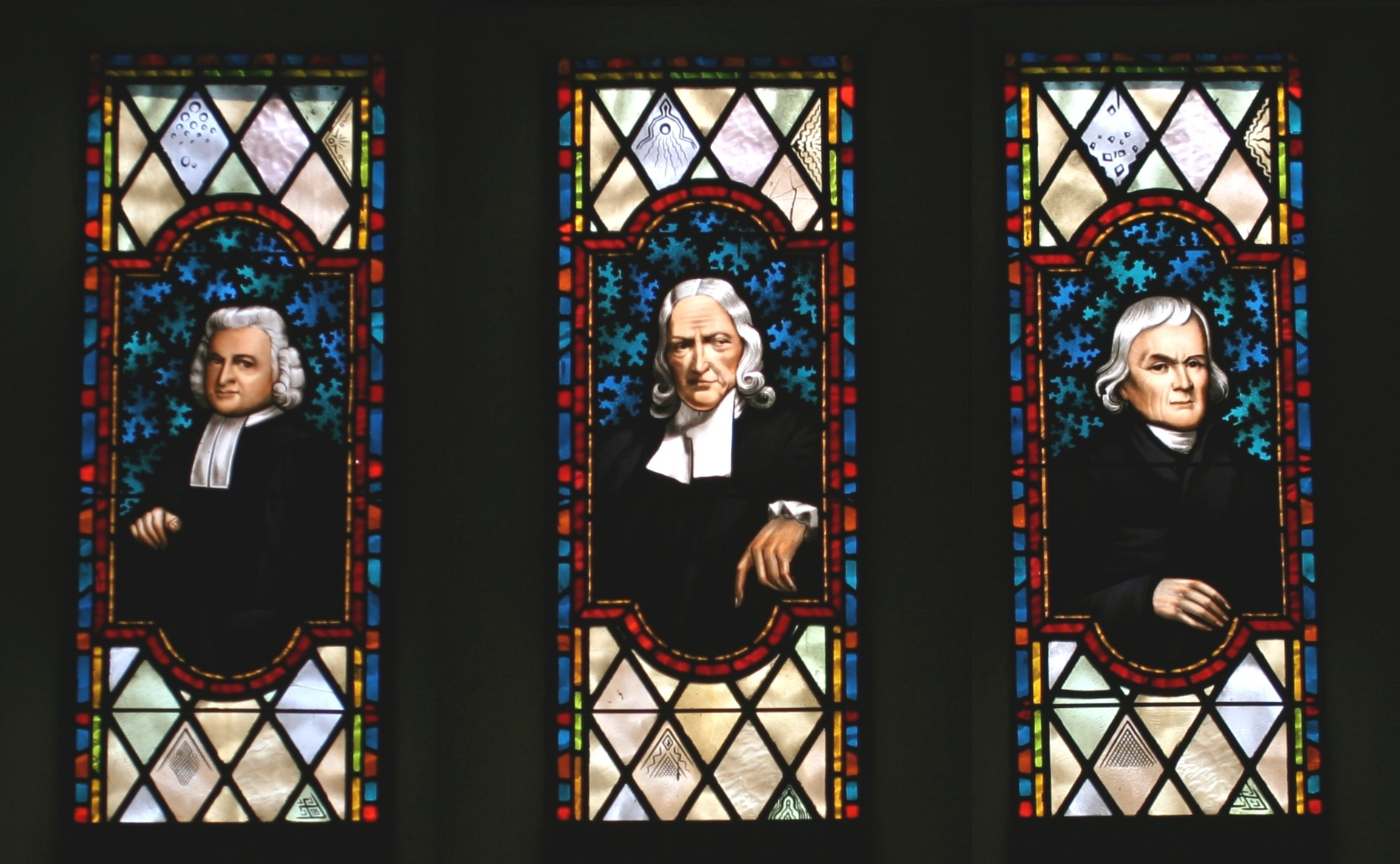
Charles Wesley, John Wesley, and Francis Asbury (stained glass), Memorial Chapel, Lake Junaluska, NC

== Legacy and honors ==
- Asbury's boyhood home, the Bishop Asbury Cottage, Newton Road, Great Barr in Sandwell, England, is now a museum.
- The first Methodist Episcopal school of higher education was named Cokesbury College (1785 - burned 1796) in honor of Asbury and Thomas Coke, drawing some concern from John Wesley. The name lives on in Cokesbury, part of the United Methodist publishing arm.
- At least six schools have been named after Asbury:
  - Asbury Methodist Primary School in Lai King, Hong Kong.
  - Two are in Wilmore, Kentucky: Asbury University and Asbury Theological Seminary.
  - In addition, DePauw University in Greencastle, Indiana was originally known as Indiana Asbury College after him.
  - Francis Asbury Elementary School in Hampton, Virginia.
  - Asbury House Child Enrichment Center in Longview, Texas
  - Asbury High School, Marshall County, Alabama
  - Asbury College, in Pangasinan, Philippines.
- James A. Bradley, a convert to Methodism, named the town he founded on the New Jersey shore, Asbury Park, after Asbury. The Mascot of the Asbury Park High School is "The Bishops."
- Asbury, New Jersey, an unincorporated community in Warren County is named after the bishop.
- The former Asbury Methodist Church on Staten Island (now the Son-Rise Interfaith Center) stands as a monument to his memory.
- In 1796 Bishop Asbury helped lay the cornerstone for the church in Hall's Mills, NJ which shortly changed its name to Asbury (now a village in Franklin Township, Warren County, NJ).
- Asbury AME Church in Chester, Pennsylvania was founded in 1845 and renamed the church in honor of Asbury in 1863
- A statue, Francis Asbury, was erected in Washington, D.C. in 1921.
- A statue of Francis Asbury on horseback was erected at Drew University in Madison, NJ.
- The Francis Asbury Trail at Lake Junaluska, NC was constructed around 1930.
- A hiking trail in the Great Smoky Mountains National Park follows part of the path Asbury took when crossing the mountains in the early 19th century. There is a monument dedicated to Asbury at Shiloh Memorial Cemetery in Pigeon Forge, Tennessee, where Asbury delivered a sermon on October 20, 1808.
- Stratosphere Balloon Cave in Germany Valley, West Virginia was for over 150 years called "Asbury Cave". (Asbury records his 1781 visit to the cave in his Journal.)
- Many towns and villages bear an Asbury United Methodist Church, including the fourth largest United Methodist Church in the denomination, located in Tulsa, OK.
- The first Methodist Church in Northern China, the Asbury Church in Peking, built in 1870 by Rev. Hiram Harrison Lowry, was named after Asbury. Today the church is known as Chongwenmen Church (崇文门教堂).
- Asbury Avenue in Evanston, Illinois, home of Northwestern University, founded by Methodists
- Asbury, Iowa was founded by Methodists.
- Asbury Road and Asbury Avenue in Ocean Grove, NJ, next to Asbury Park, with Wesley Lake separating them, is a town founded by Methodists in the late 1870s as a religious summer camp along the mid Atlantic coast. Descendants of the original campers still use the many tents in town each season and worship in the Great Auditorium.
- Asbury Street in the second Ocean Grove, a seaside town established by Methodists in mid 1800s, in Victoria Australia.
- Asbury Road, built around 1930 on the Friar Park housing estate near Asbury's birthplace
- The World War II Liberty Ship SS Francis Asbury was named in his honor.
- He wrote the constitution for and organized the Female Orphan Society of Norfolk, Virginia on March 24, 1804.
- Many Methodist Summer Camps name buildings in honor of Francis Asbury.

== See also ==
- Bethel Academy
- List of bishops of the United Methodist Church
- Perry Hall, Maryland
- Thomas S. Hinde
- Charles T. Hinde
- Divergence between Anglicanism and Methodism
