= Bishops in Methodism =

A bishop is a senior role in many Methodist denominations. The bishop's role is typically called the "episcopacy", based on the Greek word episkopos (επισκοπος), which literally means overseer. Superintendent is another translation of episkopos but in most Methodist denominations this is a role distinct from bishop. The first Methodist bishops were appointed in America, and many Methodist denominations, such as the Free Methodist Church, recognize the office of bishop. Others, such as the Methodist Church of Great Britain, do not have bishops.

== Origins of Methodist episcopacy ==
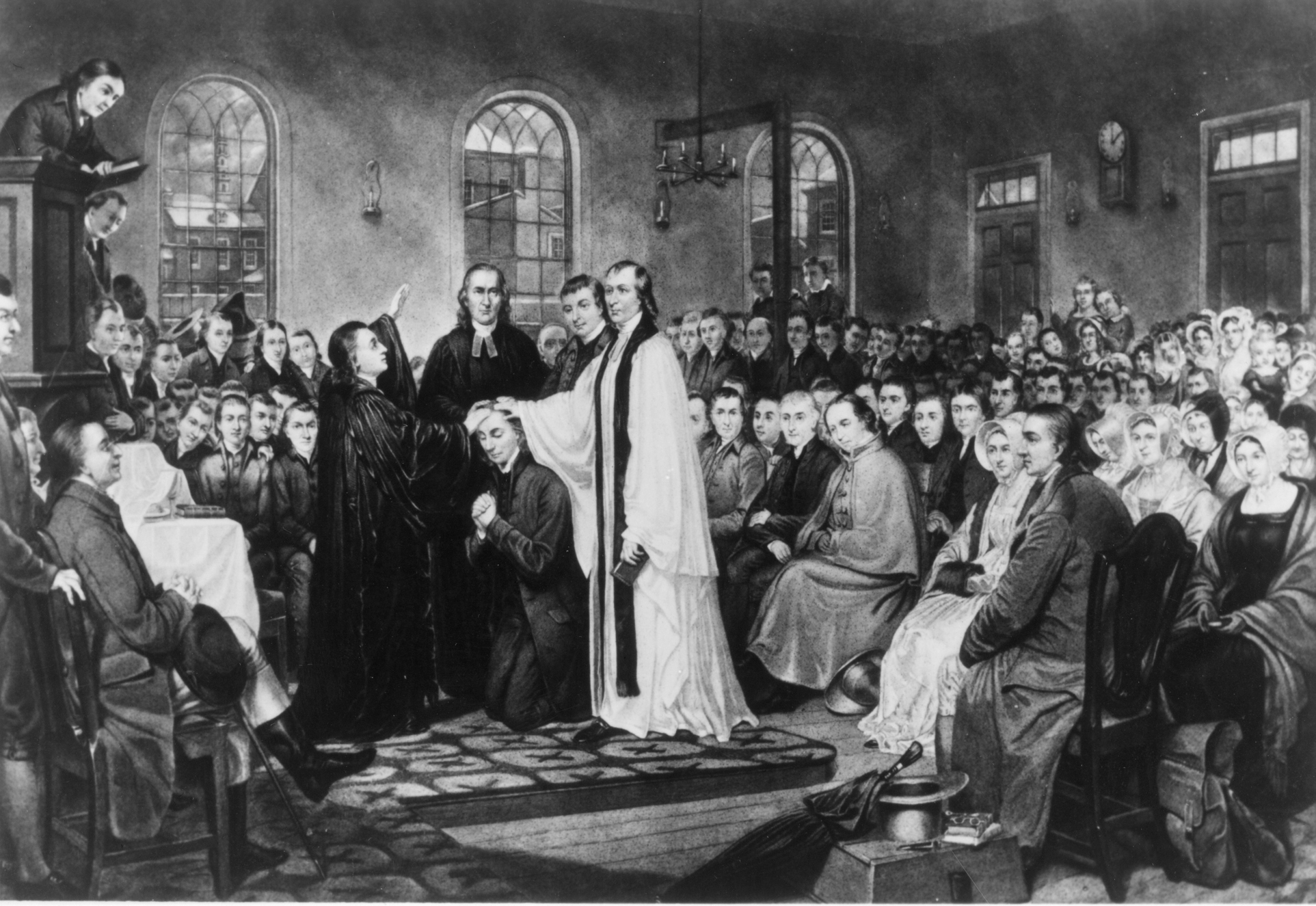
Francis Asbury's ordination as bishop by Thomas Coke at the 1784 Christmas Conference.

John Wesley consecrated Thomas Coke a "general superintendent" and directed that Francis Asbury also be consecrated for the United States in 1784, where the Methodist Episcopal Church first became a separate denomination apart from the Church of England. Coke soon returned to England, but Asbury was the primary builder of the new church. At first he did not call himself "bishop", but eventually submitted to the usage by the denomination.

Notable bishops in Methodist history include Coke, Asbury, Richard Whatcoat, Philip William Otterbein, Martin Boehm, Jacob Albright, John Seybert, Matthew Simpson, John S. Stamm, William Ragsdale Cannon, Marjorie Matthews (the first female Methodist bishop), Leontine T. Kelly, Vashti Murphy McKenzie, William B. Oden, William Willimon, R.S. Williams (the first Methodist (CME) bishop elected from Louisiana), Teresa Elaine Jefferson-Snorton, and Thomas Bickerton.

== Duties ==
=== African Methodist Episcopal Church ===
In the African Methodist Episcopal Church bishops are the chief officers of the Connectional Organization. They are elected for life by a majority vote of the general conference which meets every four years.

=== Free Methodist Church ===
The Book of Discipline of the Free Methodist Church states that "Bishops are the overseers of the church. They lead the church to fulfill its mission which requires them to be holy examples with skill and experience to provide oversight. They must understand the nature and purpose of our church. They must also be able to communicate clearly the gospel, the church's mission and the vision of the Free Methodist Church; possess a well cultivated understanding of other cultures; and identify, develop, and lead godly, competent leaders."

=== Global Methodist Church ===
In the Global Methodist Church, bishops have a similar role to that in the United Methodist Church, although they are elected to limited terms, not appointed for life. At its 2024 convening general conference, the GMC approved a constitution in which bishops function as "general superintendents," working collectively to guard the doctrine and practice of the whole church instead of being assigned to oversee individual conferences. Although they are not assigned to oversee specific annual conferences, bishop candidates are nominated from "episcopal areas" and elected to six-year terms at each general conference. Bishops may be reelected only once. The convening general conference elected and consecrated six bishops to serve the church in the intervening period before the next general conference in 2026, joining former United Methodist bishops who had previously joined the GMC.

=== United Methodist Church ===
In the United Methodist Church, a resident bishop is appointed to a specific episcopal area (i.e., the bishop resident in the area; unless a bishop happens to be retired and simply residing in the area, not assigned to it). A resident bishop is the Presiding Bishop of any and all annual (i.e., regional) conferences of the church within the area. Such bishops are said to have residential as well as presidential duties within his/her area.

In the UMC, bishops serve as administrative and pastoral superintendents of the church. They are elected for life from among the ordained elders (presbyters) by vote of the delegates in regional (called jurisdictional) conferences, and are consecrated by the other bishops present at the conference through the laying on of hands. (Central conferences may choose to elect their bishop for a term shorter than life; in many cases the practice is election for a term of four years.) In The United Methodist Church bishops are not ordained in the traditional sense (i.e. belonging to the threefold ministry of bishop, presbyter, deacon) but remain members of the "Order of Elders" while being consecrated to the "Office of the Episcopacy." Within The United Methodist Church only bishops are empowered to consecrate bishops and ordain clergy. Among their most critical duties is the ordination and appointment of clergy to serve local churches as pastor, presiding at sessions of the annual, jurisdictional, and general conferences, providing pastoral ministry for the clergy under their charge, and safeguarding the doctrine and discipline of the church. Furthermore, individual bishops, or the Council of Bishops as a whole, often serve a prophetic role, making statements on important social issues and setting forth a vision for the denomination, though they have no legislative authority of their own. In all of these areas, bishops of United Methodist Church function very much in the historic meaning of the term. According to the Book of Discipline of the United Methodist Church, a bishop's responsibilities are

Leadership.—Spiritual and Temporal.—

1. To lead and oversee the spiritual and temporal affairs of The United Methodist Church, which confesses Jesus Christ as Lord and Savior, and particularly to lead the Church in its mission of witness and service in the world. 2. To travel through the connection at large as the Council of Bishops (¶ 526) to implement strategy for the concern of the Church. 3. To provide liaison and leadership in the quest for Christian unity in ministry, mission, and structure and in the search for strengthened relationships with other living faith communities. 4. To organize such Missions as shall have been authorized by the General Conference. 5. To promote and support the evangelistic vision of the whole Church. 6. To discharge such other duties as the Discipline may direct.

Presidential Duties.—1. To preside in the General, Jurisdictional, Central, and Annual Conferences. 2. To form the districts after consultation with the district superintendents and after the number of the same has been determined by vote of the Annual Conference. 3. To appoint the district superintendents annually (¶¶ 517-518). 4. To consecrate bishops, to ordain elders and deacons, to consecrate diaconal ministers, to commission deaconesses and home missionaries, and to see that the names of the persons commissioned and consecrated are entered on the journals of the conference and that proper credentials are funised to these persons.

Working with Ministers.—1. To make and fix the appointments in the Annual Conferences, Provisional Annual Conferences, and Missions as the Discipline may direct (¶¶ 529-533).

2. To divide or to unite a circuit(s), stations(s), or mission(s) as judged necessary for missionary strategy and then to make appropriate appointments. 3. To read the appointments of deaconesses, diaconal ministers, lay persons in service under the World Division of the General Board of Global Ministries, and home missionaries. 4. To fix the Charge Conference membership of all ordained ministers appointed to ministries other than the local church in keeping with ¶443.3. 5. To transfer, upon the request of the receiving bishop, ministerial member(s) of one Annual Conference to another, provided said member(s) agrees to transfer; and to send immediately to the secretaries of both conferences involved, to the conference Boards of Ordained Ministry, and to the clearing house of the General Board of Pensions written notices of the transfer of members and of their standing in the course of study if they are undergraduates.

==== Annual conference ====
In each annual conference, United Methodist bishops serve for four year terms, and may serve up to three terms before either retirement or appointment to a new annual conference.

==== Council of Bishops ====
The collegial expression of episcopal leadership in the United Methodist Church is known is the Council of Bishops. The Council of Bishops speaks to the church and through the church into the world and gives leadership in the quest for Christian unity and interreligious relationships. The Conference of Methodist Bishops includes the United Methodist Council of Bishops plus bishops from affiliated autonomous Methodist or United churches.
