= NGC 1692 =

Galaxy in the constellation Eridanus

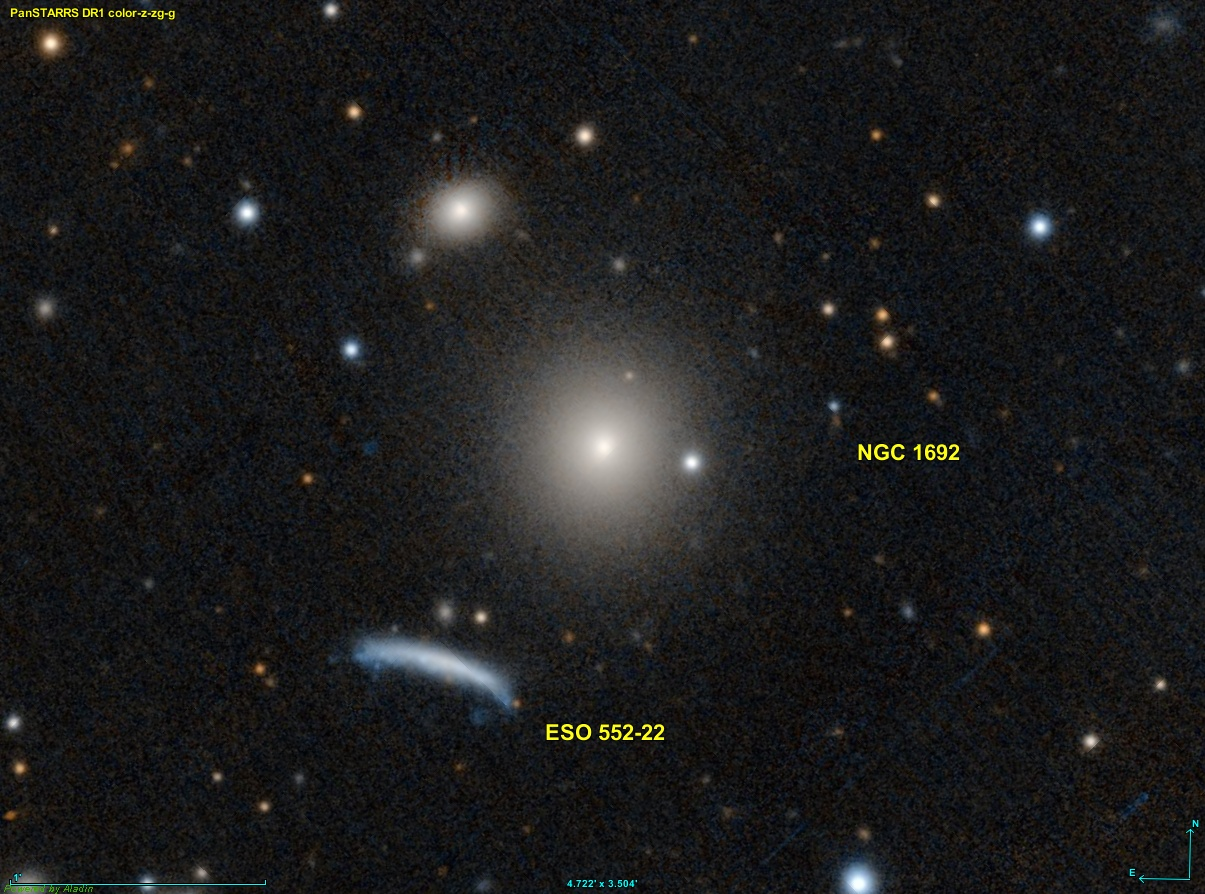
- The lenticular galaxy NGC 1692

Observation data (J2000 epoch)
- Constellation: Eridanus
- Right ascension: 04^{h} 55^{m} 23.71^{s}
- Declination: −20° 34′ 15.87″
- Redshift: 0.035364
- Heliocentric radial velocity: 10,602 km/s ± 35
- Distance: 510 Mly
- Apparent magnitude (V): 13.0

Characteristics
- Type: SA(s)0^0^: WLRG
- Size: ~387,000 ly (118.7 kpc) (estimated)

Other designations
- Cul 0453−0206, ESO 552−G021, G4Jy 0507, PGC 16336, OF −289, MCG 03-13-029, MRSS 552−097500, PAPER J073.83−20.50, RR 095a, VLSS J0455.3−2034

NGC 1692 is a lenticular galaxy and also a LINER galaxy located in the constellation of Eridanus. The galaxy has a redshift of (z) 0.035 which corresponds to a Hubble distance of 156 ± 11 megaparsecs or 510 million light-years and it was first discovered by an American astronomer named Ormond Stone on 11 December 1885.

== Description ==
NGC 1692 appears to look like an elliptical galaxy despite being categorized as a lenticular according to NASA/IPAC Database website, with an undisturbed appearance. It has one companion, an edge-on spiral galaxy located south-east from it with a C-shaped appearance. Evidence also shows that NGC 1692 also presence of excessive ultraviolet emission, traces of young stellar populations but absence of emission lines in its optical spectrum.

The galaxy has also been categorized as a radio galaxy of low-luminosity or alternatively, a weak-line radio galaxy (WLRG) of Fanaroff-Riley Type I classification. When imaged with Very Large Array (VLA), it has a double lobed structure with a radio jet located towards the direction of north-west, which terminates in a hotspot region. However when the southern part was observed, there is no radio jet but instead a warm-spot feature located at the edge of the radio lobe. Earlier imaging made in 1993, found evidence it is surrounded by diffused radio emission but no sign of any radio core. There is also a presence of a steep power-law component. Other imaging also showed the source is compact with a double structure with radio emission likely originating from hotspots rather the core region.

A study of its host galaxy has found out, there are evidence of flux on the western side, just beyond its nucleus region. This suggests the galaxy might have an asymmetric appearance.
