= NGC 3110 =

Galaxy in the constellation Sextans

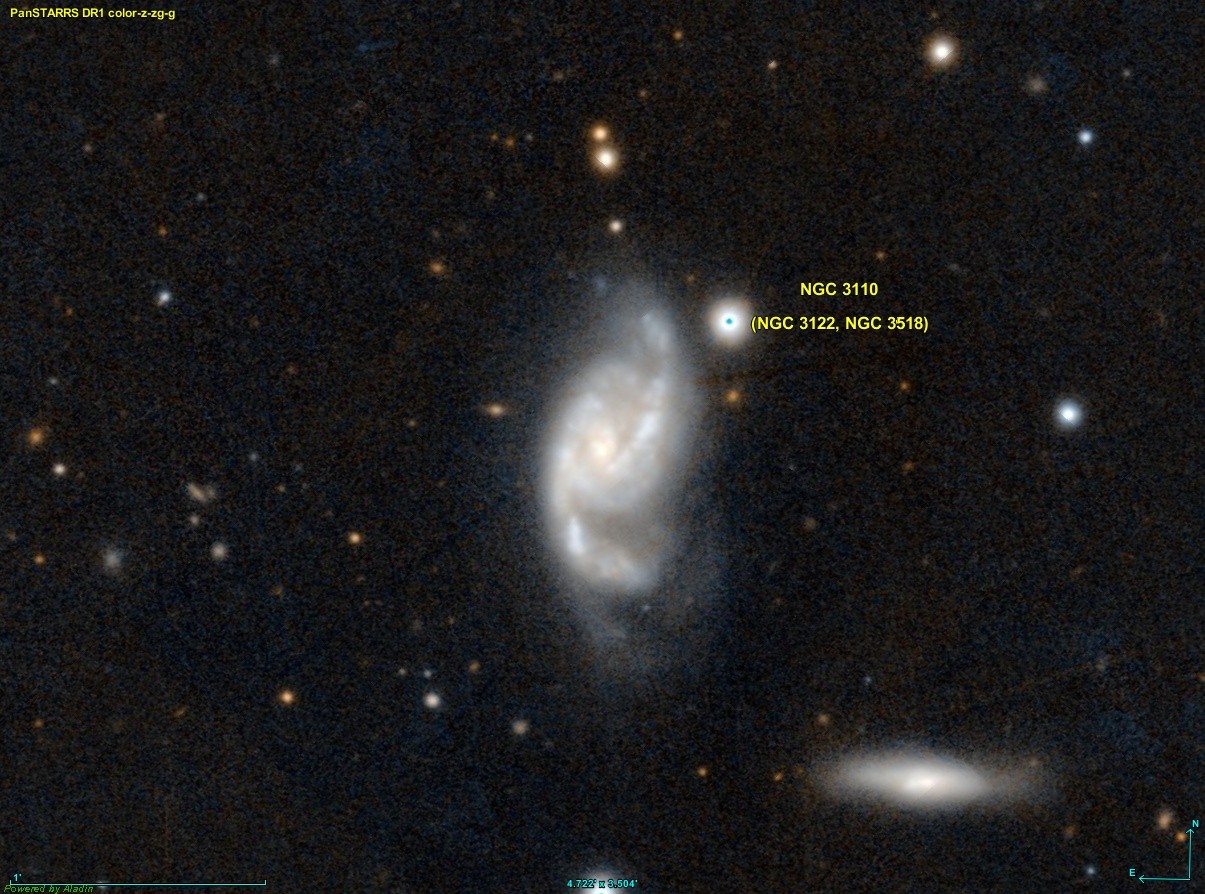

Observation data (J2000 epoch)
- Constellation: Sextans
- Right ascension: 10^{h} 04^{m} 02.0^{s}
- Declination: −06° 28′ 29″
- Redshift: 0.017070
- Heliocentric radial velocity: 5073.9 km/s
- Apparent magnitude (V): 13.5

Other designations
- NGC 3110, NGC 3122, NGC 3518, PGC 29192, MCG-01-26-014, IRAS F10015-0614

NGC 3110, also known as NGC 3122 and NGC 3518, is an active spiral galaxy in the constellation Sextans. It contains extensive Hubble-type Sb star-forming regions, and is located south of the celestial equator. It is estimated to be 218 million light-years from the Milky Way and has a diameter of around 100,000 ly. Together with PGC 29184 it forms a gravitationally bound galaxy pair. Located in the same area of the sky is the galaxy IC 589.

== Discovery ==
Multiple astronomers have documented NGC 3110 as different objects in the NGC catalogue. The object was first discovered by William Herschel on March 5, 1785, but this observation appears in the NGC catalogue under the designation NGC 3122. This galaxy was also observed by the French astronomer Édouard Stephan on February 17, 1884, and it is this observation which was entered in the NGC catalogue under the designation NGC 3110. Finally, the American astronomer Ormond Stone also observed this galaxy on December 31, 1885, and this observation was entered in the NGC catalogue under the designation NGC 3518.

== Characteristics ==
NGC 3110 has a broad HI line and is a bright infrared galaxy (LIRG). It also contains regions of ionized hydrogen. To date, three non-redshift measurements give a distance of 54.300 ± 1.375 Mpc (~177 million ly), which is outside the Hubble distance values.

== See also ==
- List of NGC objects (3001–4000)
- Galaxy formation and evolution
