= NGC 1781 =

Galaxy in the constellation Lepus

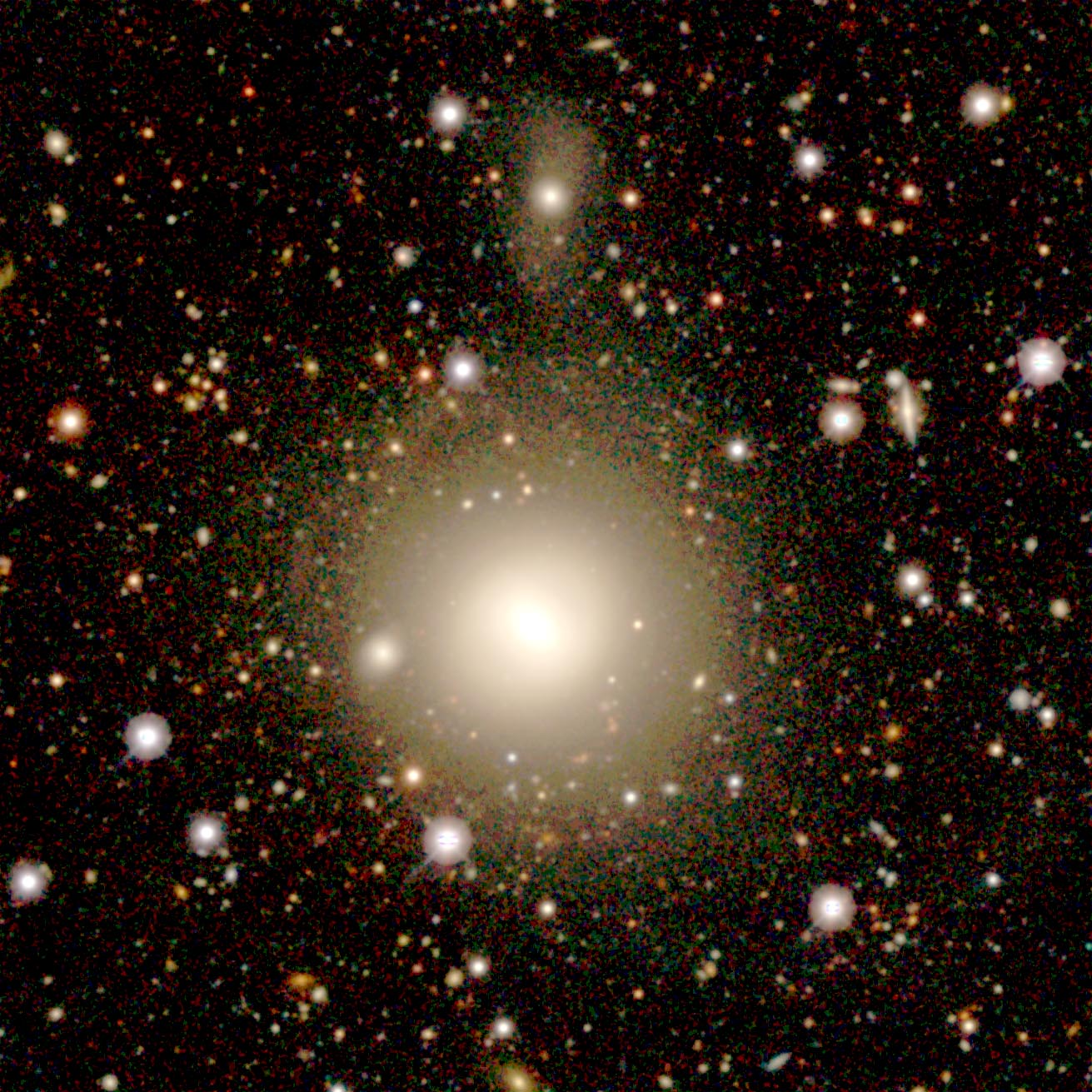
- NGC 1781 imaged by Legacy Surveys

Observation data (J2000 epoch)
- Constellation: Lepus
- Right ascension: 05^{h} 07^{m} 55.0376^{s}
- Declination: −18° 11′ 23.373″
- Redshift: 0.016645±0.0000970
- Heliocentric radial velocity: 4,990±29 km/s
- Distance: 240.4 ± 17.0 Mly (73.71 ± 5.20 Mpc)
- Apparent magnitude (V): 13.69

Characteristics
- Type: (R)SB0^0(s) pec
- Size: ~150,400 ly (46.10 kpc) (estimated)
- Apparent size (V): 1.3′ × 1.1′

Other designations
- ESO 553- G 007, IRAS 05057-1815, 2MASX J05075502-1811237, NGC 1794, MCG -03-14-002, PGC 16788

NGC 1781 is a lenticular galaxy in the constellation of Lepus. Its velocity with respect to the cosmic microwave background is 4,998±29 km/s, which corresponds to a Hubble distance of 240.4 ± 17.0 Mly (73.71 ± 5.20 Mpc). It was discovered by German-British astronomer William Herschel on 6 February 1785. It was also observed by American astronomer Ormond Stone on 11 December 1885, causing it to be listed a second time in the New General Catalogue as NGC 1794.

NGC 1781 is a Seyfert II galaxy, i.e. it has a quasar-like nucleus with very high surface brightnesses whose spectra reveal strong, high-ionisation emission lines, but unlike quasars, the host galaxy is clearly detectable.

== Supernova ==
One supernova has been observed in NGC 1781:

- SN 2025yrt (Type II, mag. 16.1) was discovered by ASAS-SN on 26 September 2025.

== See also ==
- List of NGC objects (1001–2000)
