= NGC 1210 =

Galaxy in the constellation Fornax

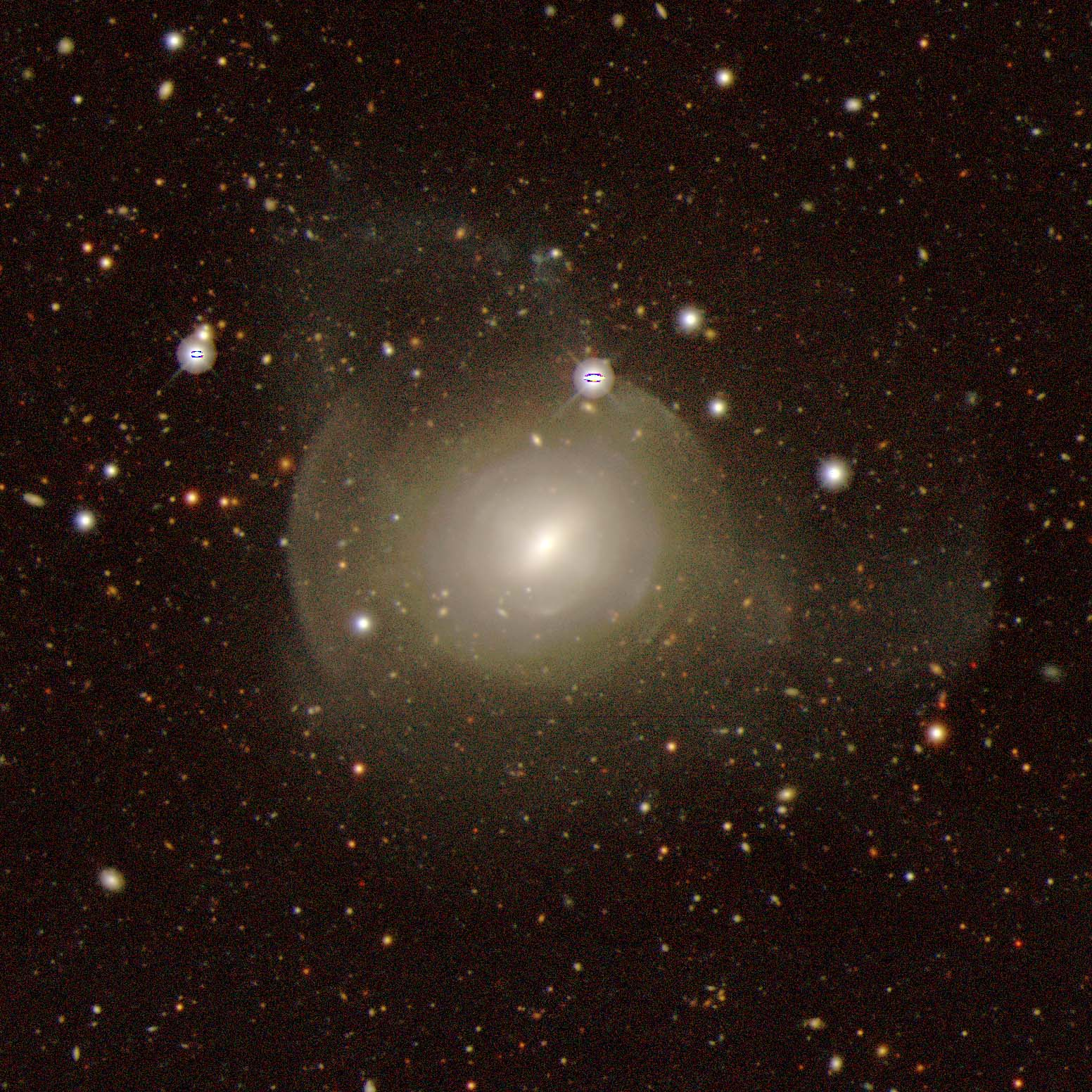
- legacy surveys image of NGC 1210

Observation data (J2000 epoch)
- Constellation: Fornax
- Right ascension: 03^{h} 06^{m} 45.35112^{s}
- Declination: −25° 42′ 58.8437″
- Redshift: 0.013242
- Heliocentric radial velocity: 3944 km/s
- Distance: 179.2 ± 12.6 Mly (54.94 ± 3.85 Mpc)
- Apparent magnitude (V): 12.65
- Apparent magnitude (B): 13.70
- Absolute magnitude (V): −21.07

Characteristics
- Type: (R')SB0^{+}(rs) pec

Other designations
- MCG -04-08-024, PGC 11666

NGC 1210 is a barred lenticular galaxy located in the constellation Fornax, about 179 million light-years from the Milky Way. It was discovered by the American astronomer Ormond Stone in 1885.

== See also ==
- List of NGC objects (1001–2000)
