= NGC 814 =

Lenticular galaxy in the constellation Cetus

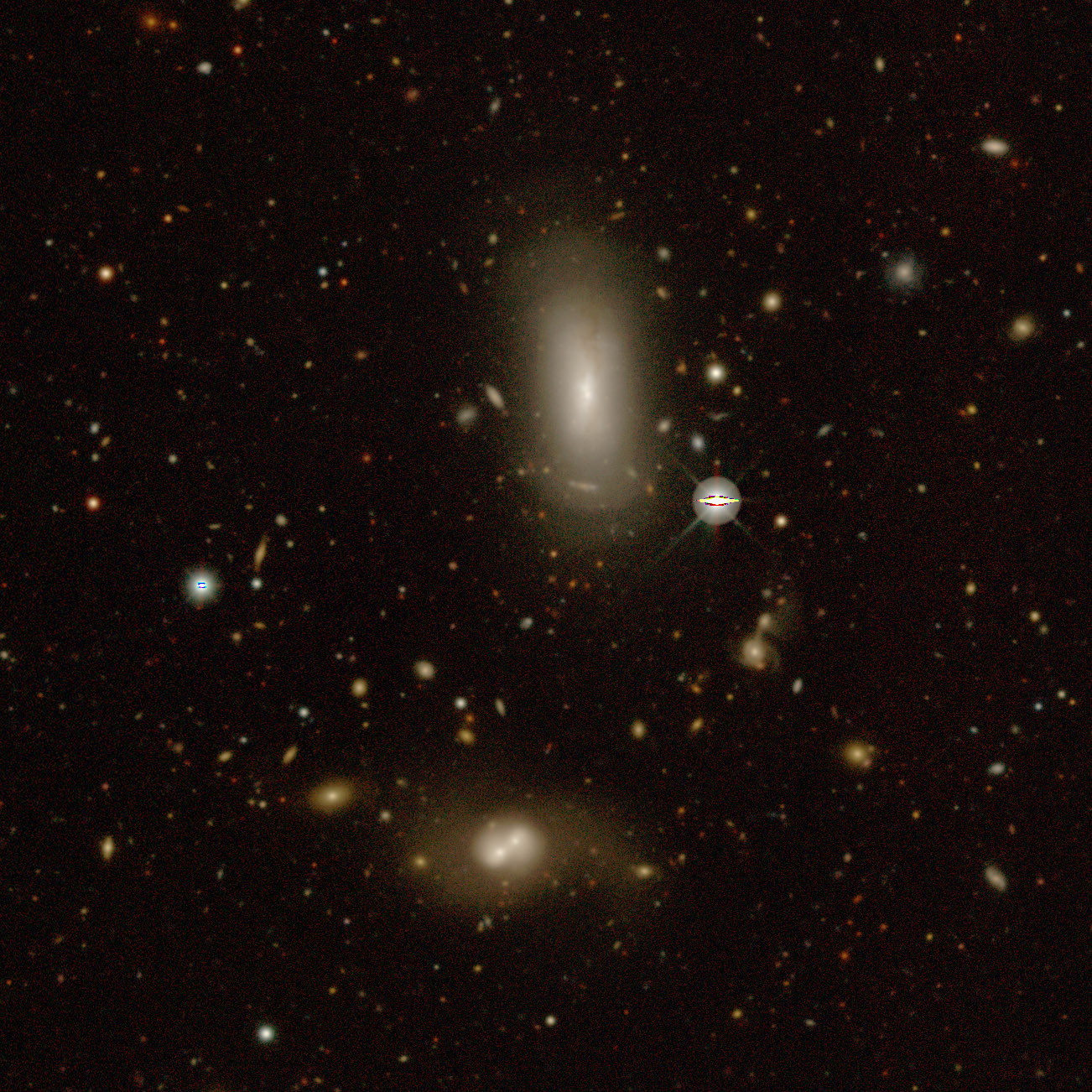
- legacy survey image of NGC 814 (top) and NGC 815 (bottom)

Observation data (J2000 epoch)
- Constellation: Cetus
- Right ascension: 02^{h} 10^{m} 37.60711^{s}
- Declination: −15° 46′ 25.2419″
- Redshift: 0.005405
- Heliocentric radial velocity: 1616 km/s
- Distance: 66.2 ± 4.9 Mly (20.30 ± 1.51 Mpc)
- Apparent magnitude (B): 14

Characteristics
- Type: SB0^{0} pec:

Other designations
- MCG -03-06-010, PGC 8319

NGC 814 is a lenticular galaxy in the constellation Cetus. It is estimated to be about 70 million light-years from the Milky Way and has a diameter of approximately 30,000 ly. NGC 814 was discovered on January 6, 1886, by the American astronomer Ormond Stone.

== See also ==
- List of NGC objects (1–1000)
