= Rudolph Dubs =

Bishop Rudolph Dubs (May 31, 1837 - March 31, 1915) was bishop of the Evangelical Association. In 1890-1891 he presided over a schism in the Evangelical Church and his followers were called Dubsites. His detractors were Esherites, followers of John Jacob Esher. His faction broke away to form the United Evangelical Church.

== Biography ==
Rudolph Dubs was born in Germany on May 31, 1837. He married Elizabeth Wabnitz on June 4, 1861, in Louisa County, Iowa.

In 1890-1891 he presided over a schism in the Evangelical Church and his followers were called Dubsites. His detractors were Esherites. His faction broke away to form the United Evangelical Church in 1894.

He died on March 31, 1915, in Harrisburg, Pennsylvania, from a heart ailment.

== See also ==
- List of bishops of the United Methodist Church
