= John Jacob Esher =

American bishop (1823–1901)

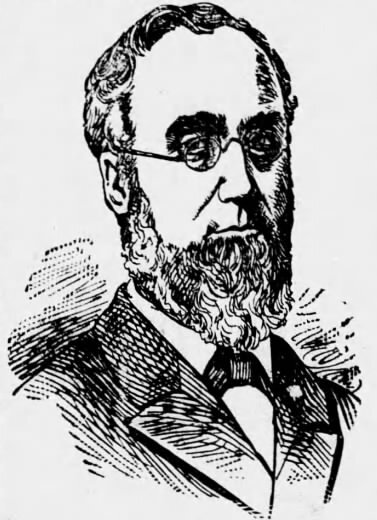
- Portrait of Esher on his obituary
- Born: December 11, 1823; Baldenheim, France
- Died: April 16, 1901 (aged 77); Chicago, Illinois, United States
- Resting place: Graceland Cemetery
- Known for: Evangelical Association
- Spouse: Anna Barbara Schneider (1823–1908)
- Parent(s): Johann Jakob Esher (1795–1874); Maria Ursula Schmidt (1796–1877)

John Jacob Esher (December 11, 1823 – April 16, 1901) was bishop of the Evangelical Association in Chicago, Illinois. In 1890-1891 he presided over a schism in the Evangelical Church and his followers were dubbed Esherites and they opposed the breakaway Dubsites. This led to the formation of the United Evangelical Church by the Dubsites.

== Biography ==
He was born in the German part of Baldenheim in Alsace, France in 1823 to Johann Jakob Esher. In 1832, at age nine, he migrated with his parents to Pennsylvania and from there his family moved to Chicago, Illinois. In 1840 he attended divinity school. In 1845 he was ordained and became a charter member of the Evangelical Church.

He married Anna Barbara Schneider (1823–1908) on August 8, 1849. They had the following children: Mary Barbara Esher (1850–1931), Sarah Emilie Esher (1852–1902), Victoria Elizabeth Escher (1852–1885), and Edward Benjamin Esher (1857–1914).

Elected, in 1863, Bishop of the Evangelical Church.

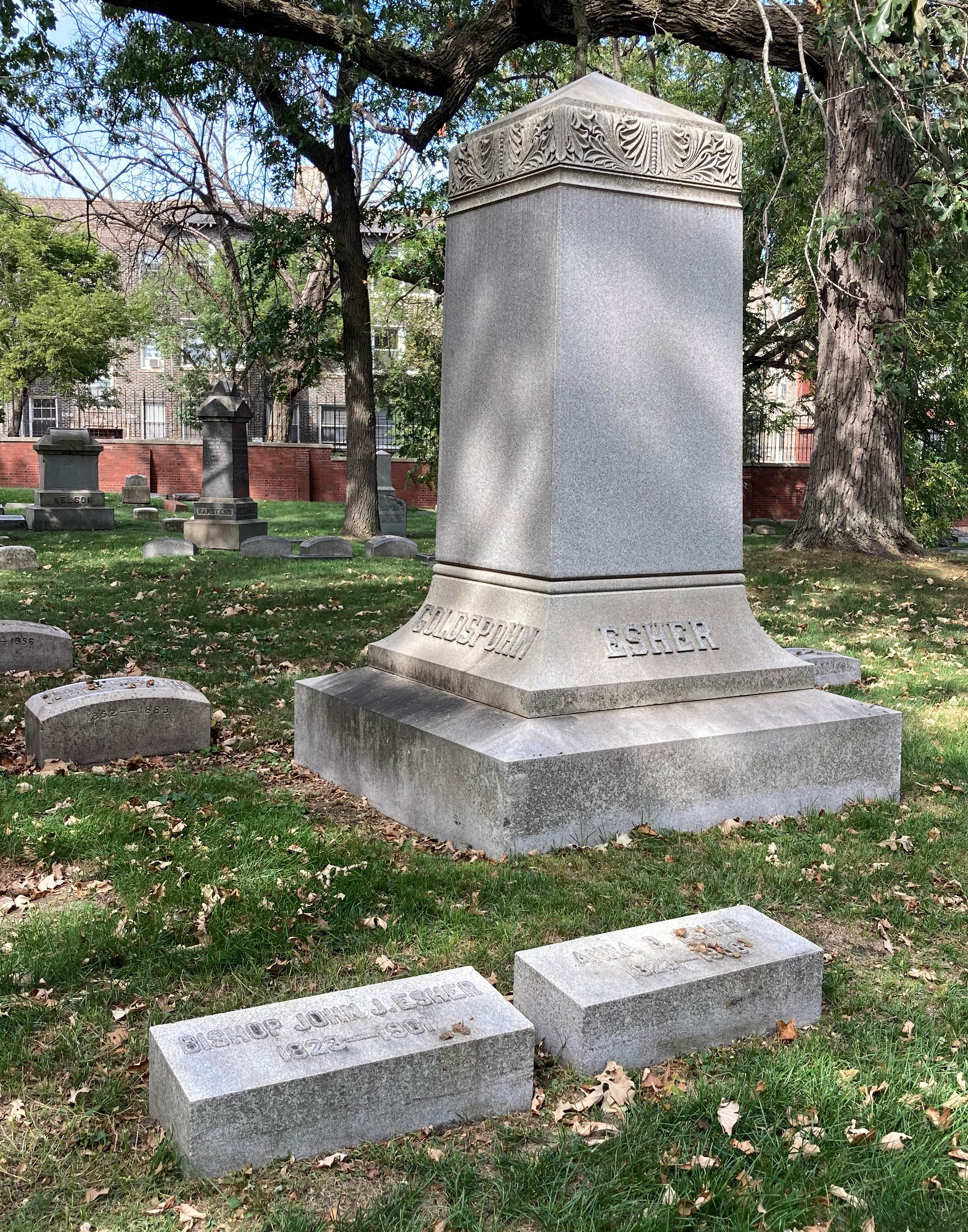
Graves of John and Anna Esher at Graceland Cemetery

Esher, Bishop Bowman and Rudolph Dubs were at loggerheads starting in 1885 over the administration of the Evangelical Association mission in Japan.

Esher was accused of being despotic in the administration of his bishopric. In 1890-1891 there was a schism in the Church between Bishop Dubs and Bishop Bowman with Bishop Esher. Bowman was related to Esher by marriage.

Esher was tried in absentia on March 20, 1890, by the Evangelical Association in Reading, Pennsylvania. The charges were: "Un-Christian conduct, slander, evil speaking and falsehood, creating dissension, and perpetuating and intensifying the agitation in the church, and disturbing her peace by a revival of old and previous adjudicated difficulties and differences." This led to the formation of the United Evangelical Church by the followers of Bishop Dubs.

Esher died on April 16, 1901, in Chicago, Illinois. He was interred in Graceland Cemetery in Chicago on April 20, 1901.

== See also ==
- List of bishops of the United Methodist Church

== Works ==
- Over Land And Sea; A Missionary Trip Around The World. (Über Länder und Meere oder eine Missionsreise um die Welt)
- Christliche Theologie, 1889-1901.
