= The Crusader (sculpture) =

Statue in Chicago, Illinois, U.S.

- Victor Lawson Monument
- U.S. Historic district – Contributing property
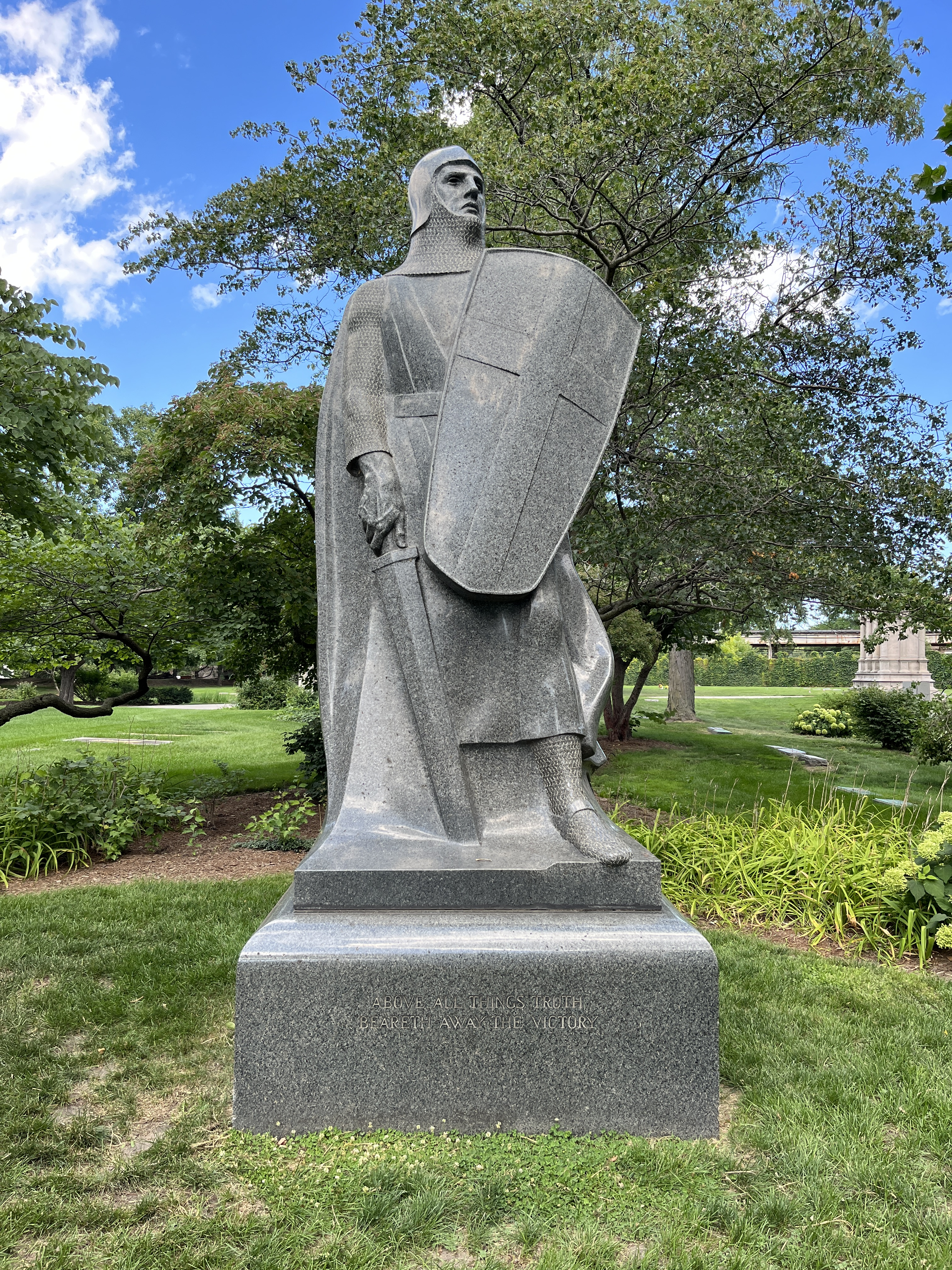
- The statue in 2023

- Location within Illinois
- Location: Chicago, Cook County, Illinois, United States
- Built: 1931
- Sculptor: Lorado Taft
- Architectural style: Gothic Revival
- Part of: Graceland Cemetery (ID00001628)
- Designated CP: January 18, 2001

The Crusader, also known as the Victor Lawson Monument, is a memorial marking the grave of Chicago newspaper publisher Victor Lawson. It is in Chicago's historic Graceland Cemetery and was designed by American sculptor Lorado Taft in 1931.

== History ==
The Crusader was created in 1931 by Lorado Taft. In Chicago's historic Graceland Cemetery, it is a monument intended to memorialize Victor F. Lawson (1850–1925), the publisher of the Chicago Daily News. The Chicago Daily News was founded by Melville E. Stone, Percy Meggy and William Dougherty in 1875. In July 1876, Lawson invested money into the publication, which was struggling, and became its business manager. By the 1890s, the paper had reached a circulation of 200,000 people. Lawson remained involved with the paper until 1925. The Crusader was commissioned by Victor Lawson's brother, Iver Lawson.

== Design ==
The Crusader is a medieval knight, and is used to symbolize the character of Victor Lawson. Standing more than thirteen feet tall, it was carved out of a solid block of dark granite supplied by the Henry C. Smalley Granite Company of Quincy, Massachusetts. The granite was then highly polished. The knight, with a large sword and shield, was an image that Taft had contemplated for years; he used it in numerous works besides The Crusader. The original model of The Crusader was done in clay.

Unlike Taft's earlier work, The Crusader emphasizes its "sheer mass", helped by the lack of realistic details in the sculpture. The monument does not bear Lawson's name, but does have an inscription which reads, "Above all things truth beareth away the victory", a quote from 1 Esdras 3:12. Stylistically, the Lawson Monument falls within Gothic Revival. The Crusader is described as "an excellent example of Taft's late style in which he blended literal realism and allegory".

== See also ==
- Eternal Silence
- List of public art in Chicago
