= Victor Lawson =

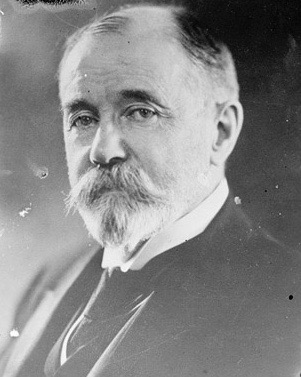
Victor Lawson, 1925

Victor Fremont Lawson (September 9, 1850 – August 19, 1925) was an American newspaper publisher who headed the Chicago Daily News from 1876 to 1925. Lawson was president of the Associated Press from 1894 to 1900, and was on the board of directors from 1900 to 1925. Outside of the newspaper business, he was involved in various philanthropic causes in Chicago. In 1919 he was appointed to the Chicago Commission on Race Relations.

== Biography ==
He was born in Chicago on September 9, 1850, to Iver Lawson (1822–72) and Melinda (Nordvig) Lawson (1827–1896). He had a brother, Iver Norman Lawson (1865–1937).

He died of a heart attack in 1925 in Chicago. He was interred at Chicago's Graceland Cemetery where his grave is marked with a sculpture of a medieval knight designed by Lorado Taft.

== Publishing ==
Lawson's family grew rich from real estate dealings in Chicago, and held stakes in a Norwegian-language newspaper called the Skandinaven. The Chicago Daily News, founded by Melville E. Stone, Percy Meggy and William Dougherty in 1875, was a tenant in the same building as the Skandinaven. The Daily News was struggling, but Victor Lawson decided to invest in it in July 1876, becoming its manager. Within twenty years, its circulation grew to 200,000 people. Lawson mainly focused on the business aspects of the paper, while Stone and others worked as editors. Helping to fuel the paper's success was Lawson's ability to attract advertisers. Lawson provided clear circulation figures to businesses and promised consistent rates for advertisements.

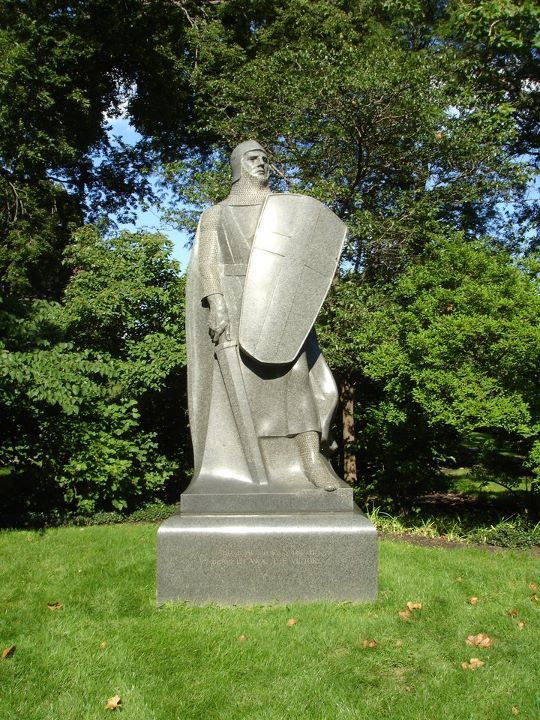
The Crusader by Lorado Taft marks Lawson's grave

The Daily News employed Eugene Field, one of the first major newspaper columnists, and contained a mix of fiction, household advice, and reports on city happenings. David Paul Nord writes, "It was quintessentially an urban newspaper, committed to private business but also to activist government, to social welfare, and to the broad public life of the city. It was a progenitor of the kind of progressive reform politics that came to flower in many cities during the early twentieth century." In 1898, Lawson founded an early foreign news service, which became a key component of the Daily News.

== Honor ==
Mount Lawson, a 5,401-foot-elevation mountain in Olympic National Park is named for him.
