= NGC 187 =

Galaxy in the constellation Cetus

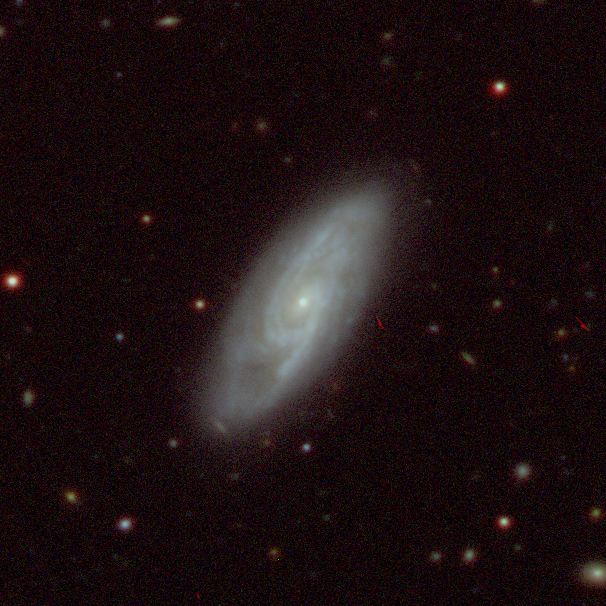
- NGC 187 with DECam

Observation data (J2000 epoch)
- Constellation: Cetus
- Right ascension: 00^{h} 39^{m} 30.4^{s}
- Declination: −14° 39′ 23″
- Redshift: 0.013132
- Apparent magnitude (V): 13.90

Characteristics
- Type: SB(s)cd
- Apparent size (V): 1.17' × 0.49'

Other designations
- MCG -03-02-034, 2MASX J00393041-1439225, 2MASXi J0039304-143922, IRAS 00369-1455, IRAS F00369-1455, 6dF J0039303-143923, PGC 2380.

NGC 187 is a barred spiral galaxy located around 3.2 million light-years away in the constellation Cetus. It was discovered by Ormond Stone on 3 November 1885.

== See also ==
- NGC
- List of NGC objects (1–1000)
- List of NGC objects
- Galaxy
