= NGC 5555 =

Spiral galaxy in the constellation Virgo

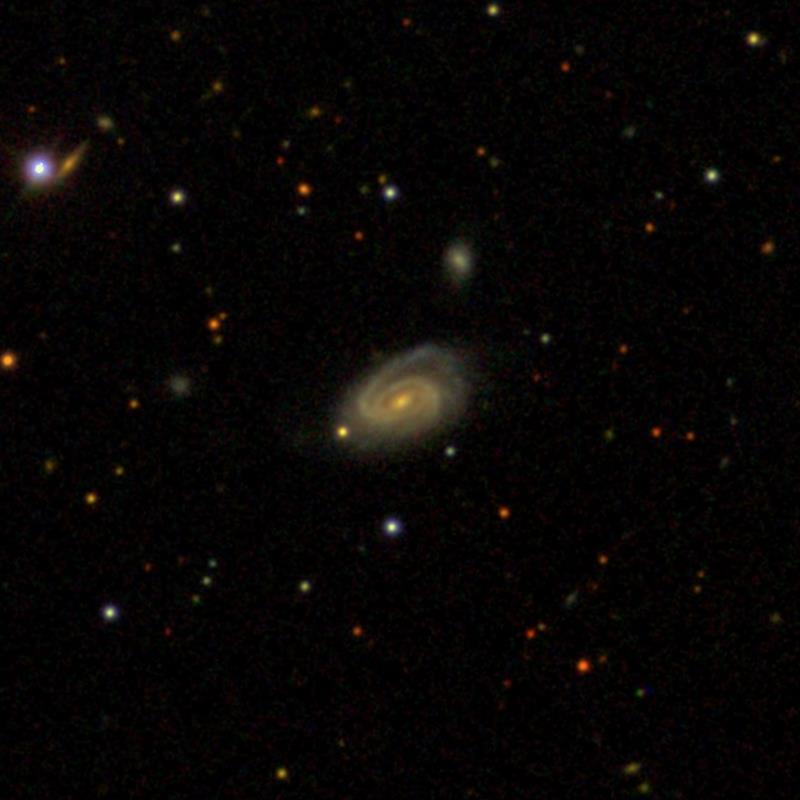
- An image of NGC 5555 from the Sloan Digital Sky Survey

Observation data (J2000 epoch)
- Constellation: Virgo
- Right ascension: 14^{h} 18^{m} 48.1085^{s}
- Declination: −19° 08′ 20.104″
- Redshift: 11200 ± 20 km/s
- Distance: 538.83mly
- Apparent magnitude (V): 15.53

Characteristics
- Type: G

Other designations
- ESO 579- G 015

NGC 5555 (also known as PGC 51124) is a spiral galaxy located in the constellation Virgo. Its velocity with respect to the cosmic microwave background is 11200 ± 20 km/s, which corresponds to a Hubble distance of 165.20 ± 11.57 Mpc (~538.83 million light-years). It was originally discovered in 1886 by the American astronomer, Ormond Stone. NGC 5555 is situated close to the celestial equator and given its visual magnitude of 15.53, NGC 5555 is visible only through long exposure photography.
