= Eternal Silence =

Eternal Silence may refer to:

- Eternal Silence (video game), Half-Life 2 mod
- Eternal Silence (sculpture), bronze sculpture in Uptown, Chicago
