= Thomas Bowman =

Thomas Bowman may refer to:

- Thomas Bowman (Methodist Episcopal bishop) (1817–1914), American bishop of the Methodist Episcopal Church, elected in 1872
- Thomas Bowman (Evangelical Association bishop) (1836–1923), bishop of the Evangelical Association, elected in 1875
- Thomas Bowman (Iowa politician) (1848–1917), US congressman from Iowa
- Thomas Bowman (Merton), English academic, warden of Merton College, Oxford
- Thomas Elliot Bowman III (1918–1995), American zoologist
- Thomas G. Bowman (born 1946), United States Deputy Secretary of Veterans Affairs
- Thomas Richard Bowman (1835–1911), South Australian pastoralist
- Tom Bowman (actor), British actor in television and films such as The Treasure of San Teresa
- Tom Bowman (journalist) (born 1955), American investigative reporter
- Tom Bowman (rugby union) (born 1976), Australian rugby union footballer
- Tommy Bowman (1873–1958), Scottish footballer who played in 1890s and 1900s

== See also ==
- Thomas Bowman Brewer (1932–2018), American academic administrator
- Thomas M. Bowen (1835–1906), American state legislator in Iowa and Colorado
