= NGC 655 =

Lenticular galaxy in the constellation Cetus

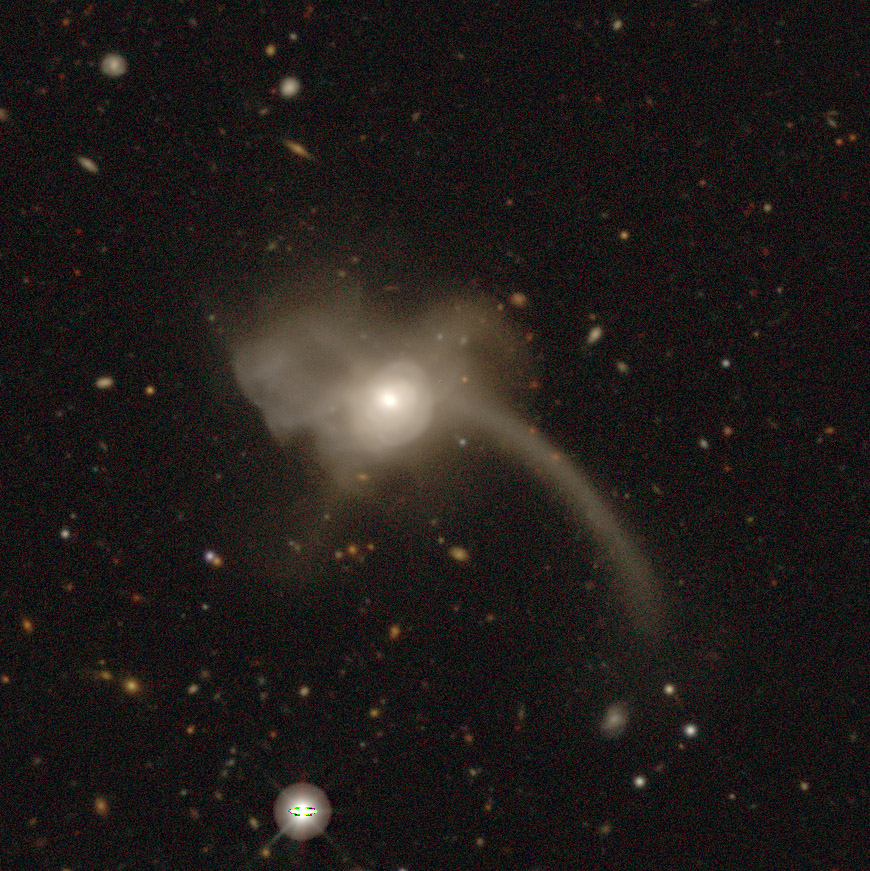
- NGC 655 from the legacy surveys

Observation data (J2000 epoch)
- Constellation: Cetus
- Right ascension: 01^{h} 42^{m} 52^{s}
- Declination: −12° 58′ 48″
- Heliocentric radial velocity: 8721.8 ± 37 km/s
- Distance: 400 Mly
- Apparent magnitude (B): 14.0

Characteristics
- Type: S0, pec
- Apparent size (V): 84" x 54"

Other designations
- PGC 6262

NGC 655 is a lenticular galaxy located 400 million light-years away in the constellation Cetus. It was discovered in a sky-survey by Ormond Stone on 12 December 1885.

== Supernovae ==
One supernova has been observed in NGC 655:

- SN 2010ec (Type Ia, mag. 17.1) was discovered by the CHilean Automatic Supernova sEarch (CHASE) on 5 June 2010.

== See also ==
- List of NGC objects (1–1000)
