= NGC 3017 =

Galaxy in Sextans constellation

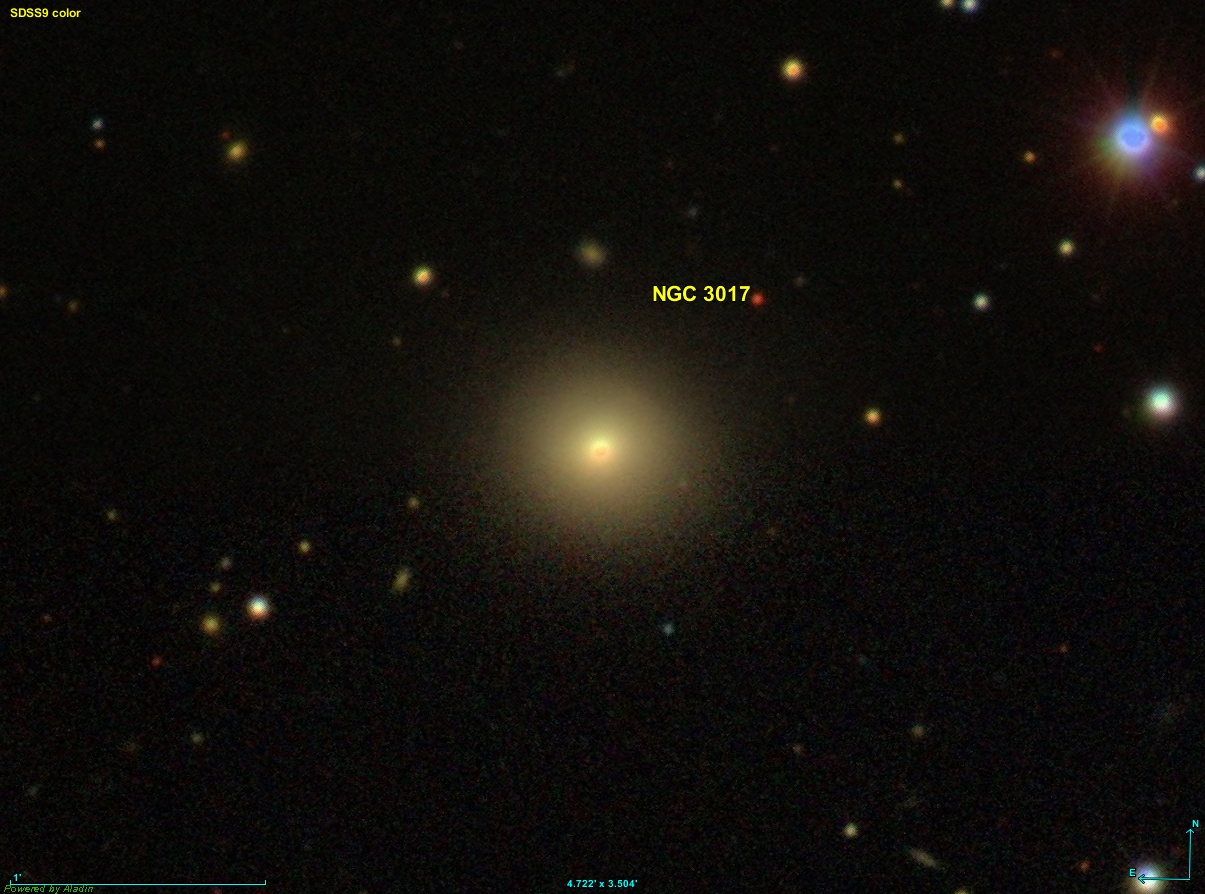
- Image of NGC 3017

Observation data (J2000 epoch)
- Constellation: Sextans
- Right ascension: 09^{h} 49^{m} 03.0379^{s}
- Declination: −2° 49′ 18.386″
- Redshift: 0.020778 ± 0.0000117
- Heliocentric radial velocity: 6229 ± 35 km/s
- Distance: 316.3 ± 22.3 Mly (96.98 ± 6.84 Mpc)
- Apparent magnitude (V): 14.4

Characteristics
- Type: E?
- Size: ~240,000 ly (73 kpc) (estimated)

Other designations
- 2MASS J09490301-0249180, LEDA 28220, PGC 28200

NGC 3017 (also known as PGC 28220) is an elliptical galaxy in the constellation Sextans. It was discovered in 1886 by Ormond Stone.

== See also ==
- List of NGC objects (3001-4000)
- List of NGC objects
