= United Evangelical Church =

Splinter group from the Evangelical Association

The United Evangelical Church is a splinter group from the Evangelical Association.

== History ==
It was formed in 1891 when some members of the Evangelical Association left to form the new church.

The schism was caused by the autocratic administration of Bishop John Jacob Esher in Chicago, Illinois. His faction was known as the Esherites and he was challenged by The Dubsites that followed Bishop Bowman.

Thirty-one years later the two groups reunited in Detroit and renamed themselves "The Evangelical Church." (Those congregations who chose not to re-unite formed a body called the Evangelical Congregational Church.)

In 1946, the Evangelical Church merged with the United Brethren in Christ at a meeting in Johnstown, Pennsylvania to form the Evangelical United Brethren Church. This body, in turn, united with the American Methodist Church in 1968 to form the United Methodist Church.

== See also ==
- Category:Bishops of the United Evangelical Church
