= Graceland Cemetery =

Historic cemetery in Chicago, Illinois, US

- U.S. National Register of Historic Places
- U.S. Historic district
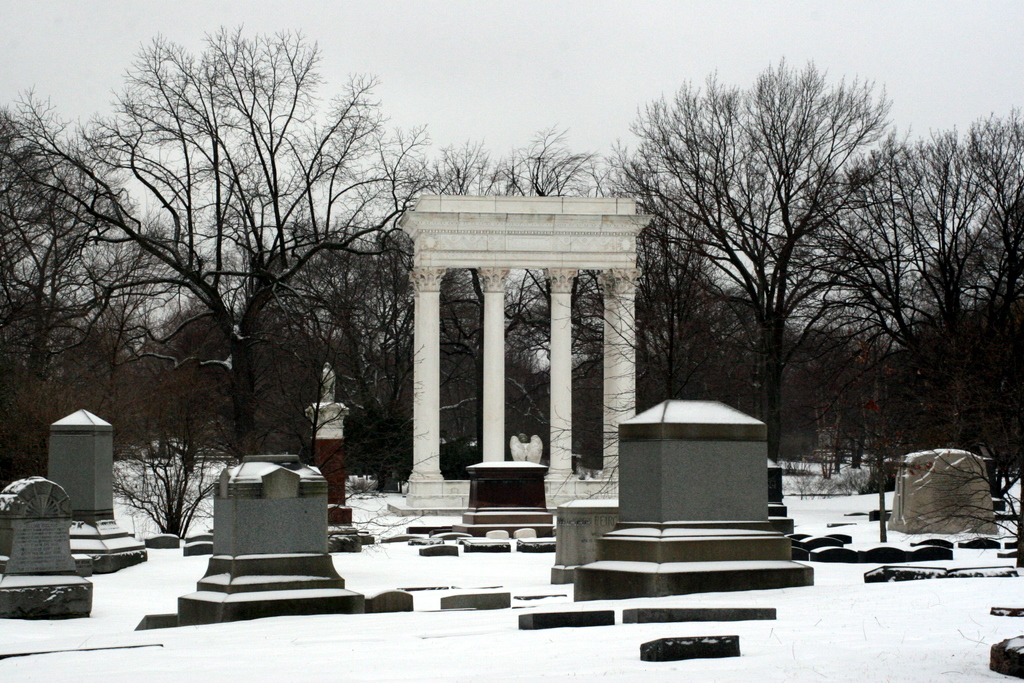

- Location within Chicago metropolitan area Location within Illinois Location within the United States
- Location: 4001 N. Clark Street, Chicago, Illinois, U.S.
- Coordinates: 41.9546°N 87.6618°W
- Area: 119 acres (48 ha)
- Built: 1860
- NRHP reference No.: 00001628
- Added to NRHP: January 18, 2001

Graceland Cemetery is a large historic garden cemetery located in the north side community area of Uptown, in Chicago, Illinois, United States. Established in 1860, its main entrance is at the intersection of Clark Street and Irving Park Road. Among the cemetery's 121 acres (49 ha) are the burial sites of several well-known Chicagoans.

Graceland includes a naturalistic reflecting lake, surrounded by winding pathways, and its pastoral plantings have led it to become a certified arboretum of more than 2,000 trees. The cemetery's wide variety of burial monuments include a number designed by famous architects, several of whom are also buried in the cemetery.

== History ==
=== Establishment ===
Thomas Barbour Bryan, a Chicago businessman, established Graceland Cemetery in 1860 with the original 80-acre (32 ha) layout designed by Swain Nelson. Bryan created it through a business partnership with William Butler Ogden, Sidney Sawyer, Edwin H. Sheldon, and George Peter Alexander Healy. Bryan was the inaugural president of the Graceland Cemetery Association, with Healy serving as treasurer.

Bryan had been motivated to establish a new cemetery after being disappointed by the "neglected and actually repulsive condition" of Chicago's City Cemetery when his son Daniel was buried there. He sought to create a "rural burying ground, more remote from and worthy of the city [of Chicago]." but he placed his ambition on hold after Rosehill Cemetery was opened by a group independent of Bryan. However, after he was offered the presidency of the company that operated Rosehill Cemetery, Bryan became motivated to pursue his shelved plans to establish his own cemetery.

Bryan purchased land for his cemetery from the heirs of Justin Butterfield. He collaborated with several landscape architects to design the cemetery and fought challenges from the owners of adjacent properties who opposed his plans. In April 1860, the first burial at Graceland Cemetery occurred when Bryan's son Daniel was reinterred. Graceland Cemetery was formally dedicated that August.

=== 19th century operations ===
Daniel Page Bryan's disinterment from City Cemetery was an early part of the greater process of relocating the thousands of remains at the City Cemetery and transforming that site into a public park. The remains of approximately 2,000 individuals were relocated in this process, which was completed in the 1870s. Graceland and Rosehill were the reburial sites of many of these remains. Graceland quickly established itself as a popular choice of burial site for prominent Chicagoans, with many opting to pre-erect burial monuments at the cemetery for their future burials. In 1870, Horace Cleveland designed curving paths, open vistas, and a small lake to create a park-like setting.

In 1878, Bryan hired his nephew Bryan Lathrop as president. In 1879, the cemetery acquired an additional 35 acres (14 ha), and Ossian Cole Simonds was hired as its landscape architect to design the addition. Lathrop and Simonds wanted to incorporate naturalistic settings to create picturesque views that were the foundation of the Prairie style. Lathrop was open to new ideas and provided opportunities for experimentation which led to Simonds use of native plants including oak, ash, witch hazel, and dogwood at a time when many viewed native plants as invasive. The Graceland Cemetery Association designated one section of the grounds to be devoid of monuments and instituted a review process led by Simonds for monuments and family plots. Simonds later became the superintendent at Graceland until 1897, and continued on as a consultant until his death in 1931.

From its founding, Graceland was the only white-owned cemetery in Chicago that was integrated; the site's bylaws never included racial restrictions and several prominent Black Chicagoans are buried there.

=== 20th century ===
Graceland's attractive parklike appearance and elaborate burial monuments made it a popular site. Visitation became so large, that in the early 20th century its operators grew concerned that it had turned too popular as a recreation grounds, to the detriment of its character as a cemetery. For a period, it instituted a policy in which open admission to the grounds was only permitted on Sundays and holidays, with the remaining dates seeing access limited to ticket holders. Graceland's popularity as a pleasure grounds declined in subsequent decades, however, as public attitude moved away from seeing cemeteries as appropriate sites for leisure. At the same time, the condition of the cemetery began to suffer from neglect.

=== 21st century ===
In the early 21st century, attention was turned to repair the cemetery and restore much of its 19th-century landscape. Graceland Cemetery was added to the National Register of Historic Places on January 18, 2001.

In 2020, the cemetery's landscape was damaged in a derecho (severe windstorm) that uprooted 50 mature trees. The cemetery was closed for several weeks thereafter to clean up the damage. Young trees were planted to replace the mature trees that were lost.

== Geography ==
Graceland Cemetery is an example of a rural cemetery, which is a style of cemetery characterized by landscaped natural areas. The concept of the rural cemetery emerged in the early 19th century as a response to overcrowding and poor maintenance in existing cemeteries in Europe.

In the 19th century, a train to the north suburbs occupied the eastern edge of the cemetery, where the Chicago "L" train now runs. The line was also used to carry mourners to funerals, in specially rented funeral cars. As a result, there was an entry through the east wall, which has since been closed. When founded, the cemetery was well outside the city limits of Chicago. After the Great Chicago Fire in 1871, Lincoln Park, which had been the city's cemetery, was deconsecrated and some of the bodies were reinterred to Graceland Cemetery.

The edge of the pond around Daniel Burnham's burial island was once lined with broken headstones and coping transported from Lincoln Park. Lincoln Park was redeveloped as a recreational area. A single mausoleum remains, the "Couch tomb", containing the remains of Ira Couch. The Couch Tomb is probably the oldest extant structure in the city, everything else having been destroyed by the Great Chicago Fire.

The cemetery's walls are topped off with wrought iron spear point fencing.

== Notable tombs and monuments ==
Many of the cemetery's tombs are of great architectural or artistic interest, including the Getty Tomb, the Martin Ryerson Mausoleum (both designed by architect Louis Sullivan, who is also buried in the cemetery), and the Schoenhofen Pyramid Mausoleum. The industrialist George Pullman was buried at night, in a lead-lined coffin within an elaborately reinforced steel-and-concrete vault, to prevent his body from being exhumed and desecrated by labor activists.

William Hulbert, the first president of the National League, has a monument in the shape of a baseball with the names of the original National League cities on it.

Along with its other famous burials, the cemetery is notable for two statues by the renowned Chicago sculptor Lorado Taft, Eternal Silence for the Graves family plot and The Crusader that marks Victor Lawson's final resting place.

== Notable burials ==
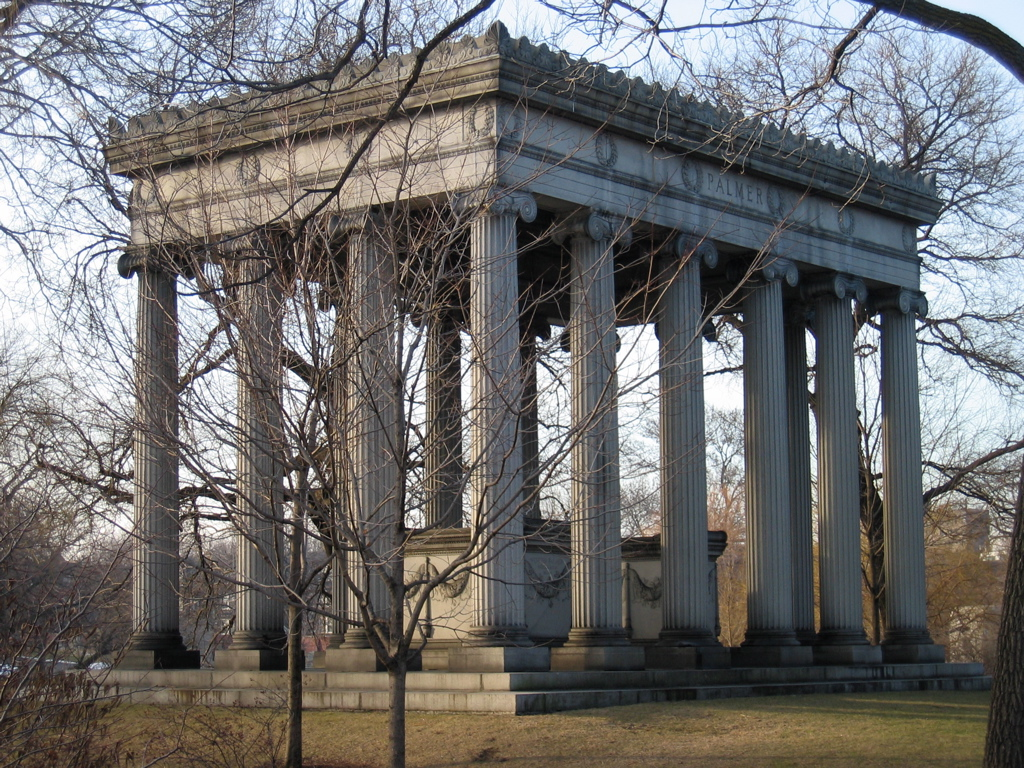
The mausoleum of Potter Palmer and Bertha Honoré Palmer

- David Adler, architect
- Walter Webb Allport, dentist
- John Peter Altgeld, Governor of Illinois
- Amabel Anderson Arnold, organized the Woman's State Bar Association of Missouri, the first association of women lawyers in the world
- Philip Danforth Armour, meat packing magnate
- Ernie Banks, Chicago Cubs Hall of Fame baseball player
- Frederic Clay Bartlett, artist, art collector
- Granville Bates, American actor
- Mary Hastings Bradley, author
- Lorenz Brentano, member of the State House of Representatives, United States consul at Dresden, Congressional Representative for Illinois
- Doug Buffone, Chicago Bears former linebacker, host WSCR
- Daniel H. Burnham, architect
- Fred A. Busse, mayor of Chicago
- Justin Butterfield, attorney, land grant developer
- Elizabeth Cameron (editor) (1851–1929), magazine editor
- Ronald Coase, economist
- Lydia Avery Coonley, author (cremated at Graceland, but not actually buried there)
- Oscar Stanton De Priest first African American in the 20th century to be elected to Congress.
- William Deering, founder of Deering Harvester Company, which later became International Harvester Company, father of James and Charles Deering
- James Deering, executive of Deering Harvester Company and original owner of the Villa Vizcaya estate
- Charles Deering, executive of Deering Harvester Company, former chairman of International Harvester Company, and philanthropist
- Augustus Dickens, brother of Charles Dickens (he died penniless in Chicago)
- George Elmslie, architect
- John Jacob Esher (1823–1901), Bishop of the Evangelical Association
- Marshall Field, businessman, retailer, whose memorial was designed by Henry Bacon, with sculpture by Daniel Chester French
- Bob Fitzsimmons, Heavyweight boxing champion, born in Cornwall, UK
- Melville Fuller, Chief Justice of the United States
- Elbert H. Gary, judge, chairman of U.S. Steel, namesake of Gary, Indiana.
- Bruce A. Goff, architect
- Sarah E. Goode, first African-American woman to receive a United States patent
- Bruce Graham, co-architect of John Hancock building and Sears Tower (now called the Willis Tower)
- Dexter Graves was an early pioneer in the city who arrived on the schooner Telegraph in the 1830s. His memorial by Lorado Taft is the statue Eternal Silence (also known as "the Dexter Graves Monument").
- Richard T. Greener, first black graduate of Harvard (1870), first black professor at the University of South Carolina (1873–1877), administrator for the Ulysses S. Grant Memorial, and diplomat to Russia
- Marion Mahony Griffin, architect
- Carter Harrison III, mayor of Chicago
- Carter Harrison IV, mayor of Chicago
- Joe Hill, labor activist, incinerated here, ashes scattered elsewhere
- William Holabird, architect
- Henry Honoré, businessman, father of Bertha Honoré Palmer, father-in-law of Potter Palmer
- William Hulbert, president of baseball's National League
- Charles L. Hutchinson, banker, philanthropist and founding president of the Art Institute of Chicago
- Isadore Gilbert Jeffery (1840–1919), poet
- William Le Baron Jenney, architect, Father of the American skyscraper
- Elmer C. Jensen, "The Dean of Chicago Architects"
- Jack Johnson, first African-American heavyweight boxing champion
- William Johnson, educator who served as superintendent of Chicago Public Schools
- John and Mary Richardson Jones, husband-and-wife abolitionists and activists
- Fazlur Khan, co-architect of John Hancock building and Sears Tower (now called the Willis Tower)

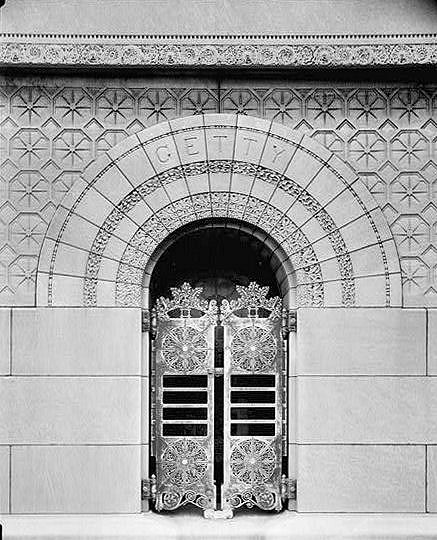
Getty Tomb for Carrie Eliza Getty, designed by Louis Sullivan, 1890

- William Wallace Kimball, Kimball Piano and Organ Company
- John Kinzie, Canadian pioneer, early white settler in the city of Chicago
- Cornelius Krieghoff, Canadian artist
- Jewel Lafontant, first African-American woman deputy solicitor general of the United States
- Bryan Lathrop, businessman, philanthropist, and longtime president of the cemetery
- Robert Henry Lawrence Jr., first African American astronaut (cremated at Graceland, but not physically buried there)
- Victor F. Lawson, editor and publisher of the Chicago Daily News
- Agnes Lee, poet and translator
- Li Fu Lee, first Chinese woman to attend the Massachusetts Institute of Technology
- Frank Lowden, Governor of Illinois
- Franklin H. Martin, physician
- Alexander C. McClurg, bookseller and Civil War general
- Cyrus McCormick, businessman, inventor
- Edith Rockefeller McCormick, Daughter-in-law of reaper inventor Cyrus McCormick and one of the four adult children of John D. Rockefeller
- Katherine Dexter McCormick, Daughter-in-law of reaper inventor Cyrus McCormick, MIT grad, biologist, suffragist, philanthropist
- Maryland Mathison Hooper McCormick, second wife of Col. Robert R. McCormick
- Nancy "Nettie" Fowler McCormick, businesswoman, philanthropist
- Florence McLandburgh, writer
- Joseph Medill, publisher, mayor of Chicago
- Ludwig Mies van der Rohe, architect
- Minnie Miñoso, Chicago White Sox Hall of Fame baseball player, Cuban-American baseball pioneer
- László Moholy-Nagy, influential photographer, teacher, and founder of the New Bauhaus and Institute of Design IIT in Chicago
- Dawn Clark Netsch, comptroller of Illinois, professor & spouse of architect Walter Netsch
- Walter Netsch, architect
- Richard Nickel, photographer, architectural historian and preservationist
- Ruth Page, dancer and choreographer
- Seth Paine, abolitionist, activist, businessman, spiritualist
- Bertha Honoré Palmer, philanthropist
- Francis W. Palmer, newspaper printer, U.S. Representative, Public Printer of the United States
- Potter Palmer, businessman
- Allan Pinkerton, detective, progenitor of the Secret Service
- William Henry Powell, Medal of Honor recipient
- George Pullman, inventor and railway industrialist
- Wilhelm Rapp, newspaper editor
- Hermann Raster, newspaper editor, politician and abolitionist
- John Wellborn Root, architect
- Howard Van Doren Shaw, architect
- Washington Smith, pioneer wholesale grocer and philanthropist. The Washington and Jane Smith Home (now Smith Village) was named in his honor.
- Louis Sullivan, architect
- Victims of the Iroquois Theatre Fire (1903)
- Victims of the Eastland Disaster (1915)
- Charles Wacker, businessman and philanthropist, also director of the 1893 Columbian Exposition
- Kate Warne, first female detective, Allan Pinkerton employee
- Hempstead Washburne, mayor of Chicago
- Frank Wenter, politician
- Daniel Hale Williams, African-American surgeon who performed one of the first successful operations on the pericardium
- George Ellery Wood, lumber baron. His home, built in 1885, on 2801 S. Prairie Ave. in Chicago, IL is a historical landmark

== See also ==
- List of burial places of justices of the Supreme Court of the United States
- List of mausoleums
- United States National Cemeteries
