= Dearborn Seminary =

- Chicago, Illinois; United States

Information
- Type: Private
- Religious affiliation: non-sectarian
- Established: 1855
- Gender: girls' boarding school

Dearborn Seminary was a non-sectarian girls' boarding school in the U.S. state of Illinois. A private school, it was incorporated in September, 1855, and was at one time the oldest institution of its kind in Chicago. It was for many years under the charge of Zuinglius Grover. From 1885 until 1899, Jennie F. Purington, later a member of the Board of Trustees, was principal of the seminary. In 1899, the school was reincorporated and became affiliated with the University of Chicago. It was located at 2252 Calumet Avenue. The course of study was arranged for preparation for college. In addition to the academic department, there were intermediate, primary, and kindergarten departments.

== Notable people ==
- Lucy M. Hall (1843–1907), physician, writer
- Florence McLandburgh (1850–1934) writer
- Harriet Monroe, poet and editor
