= Walter Webb Allport =

American dentist (1824–1893)

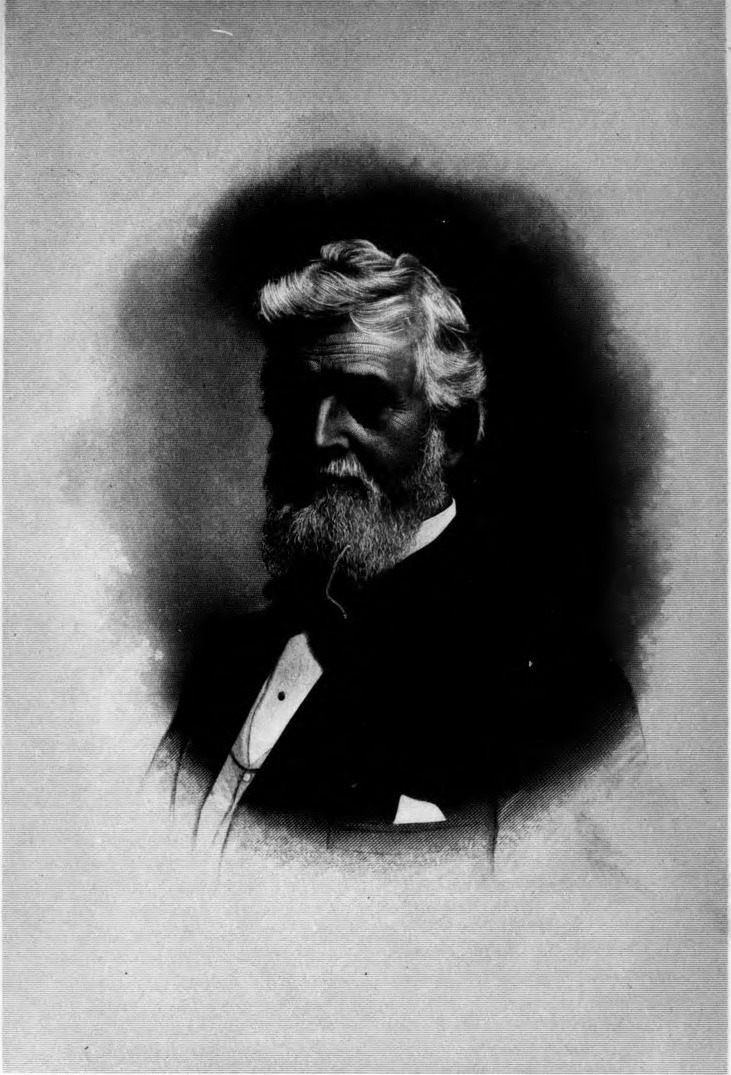
- Born: June 10, 1824; Lorraine
- Died: March 21, 1893
- Occupation: Dentist

Walter Webb Allport (June 10, 1824 – March 21, 1893) was an American dentist from New York. Raised on a farm, he left home at the age of fourteen following the Panic of 1837. He studied dentistry at the New York College of Dental Surgery and moved to Chicago, Illinois, shortly after receiving his Doctor of Dental Surgery. He became the preeminent dentist in Chicago, noted for his early use of crystalline gold fillings. He co-founded the American Dental Association in 1859, serving on its board of directors and later serving as president. He also co-founded the Chicago Dental Infirmary. Allport is also noted for his invention of the dental registration ledger.

== Biography ==
Walter Webb Allport was born in Lorain, New York, on June 10, 1824. He was a cousin of English railroad manager James Joseph Allport. Allport was raised on the family farm in Scriba, New York, often hauling wood to Oswego, New York. His father lost the farm in the Panic of 1837 and Walter was forced to leave home to make his own living at the age of fourteen. After working on a farm in Rodman, New York, he left for Watertown to learn a trade. He began to study medicine under Amasa Trowbridge in 1844, graduating two years later. He joined the dental firm of Denning & Robinson. In 1848, Allport left to become the junior partner with Dr. D. W. Perkins in Rome. He later practiced alone in Pulaski. Allport attended the New York College of Dental Surgery in 1852, graduating with a Doctor of Dental Surgery the next year.

In 1854, Allport decided to move west to take advantage of the growing population of Chicago, Illinois. He founded an office at 144 Lake Street, sharing the space with a physician. Allport rented a barber's chair by the month to use as an operating chair. In May 1855, he moved to 75 Clark Street, then two years later to 32 Washington Strert. His clientele rapidly grew as Allport was one of the only dentists to know how to use crystal gold for fillings. He was elected Corresponding Secretary of the American Dental Convention in 1856. Two years later, he was elected president of the Western Dental Society. The next year, he was president of the convention that founded the American Dental Association at Niagara Falls, New York. He was elected first chairman of the organization in 1860. With Dr. S. T. Creighton, he began publishing the People's Dental Journal in January 1863, which ran for two years.

Allport helped to organize the Chicago Dental Association in 1864. In 1865, Allport was named president of the American Dental Convention and became a charter member of the Illinois State Dental Society. Allport occasionally lectured at Rush Medical College and was named an emeritus professor of that institution. Rush awarded him an honorary Doctor of Medicine (MD) in 1881. He co-founded the Chicago Dental Infirmary in 1883. The school was organized to provide students with an MD degree an opportunity to also pursue a Doctor of Dental Surgery. The school was unsuccessful, and a year later the institution dropped its MD requirement and was renamed the Chicago College of Dental Surgery. Allport remained as a director.

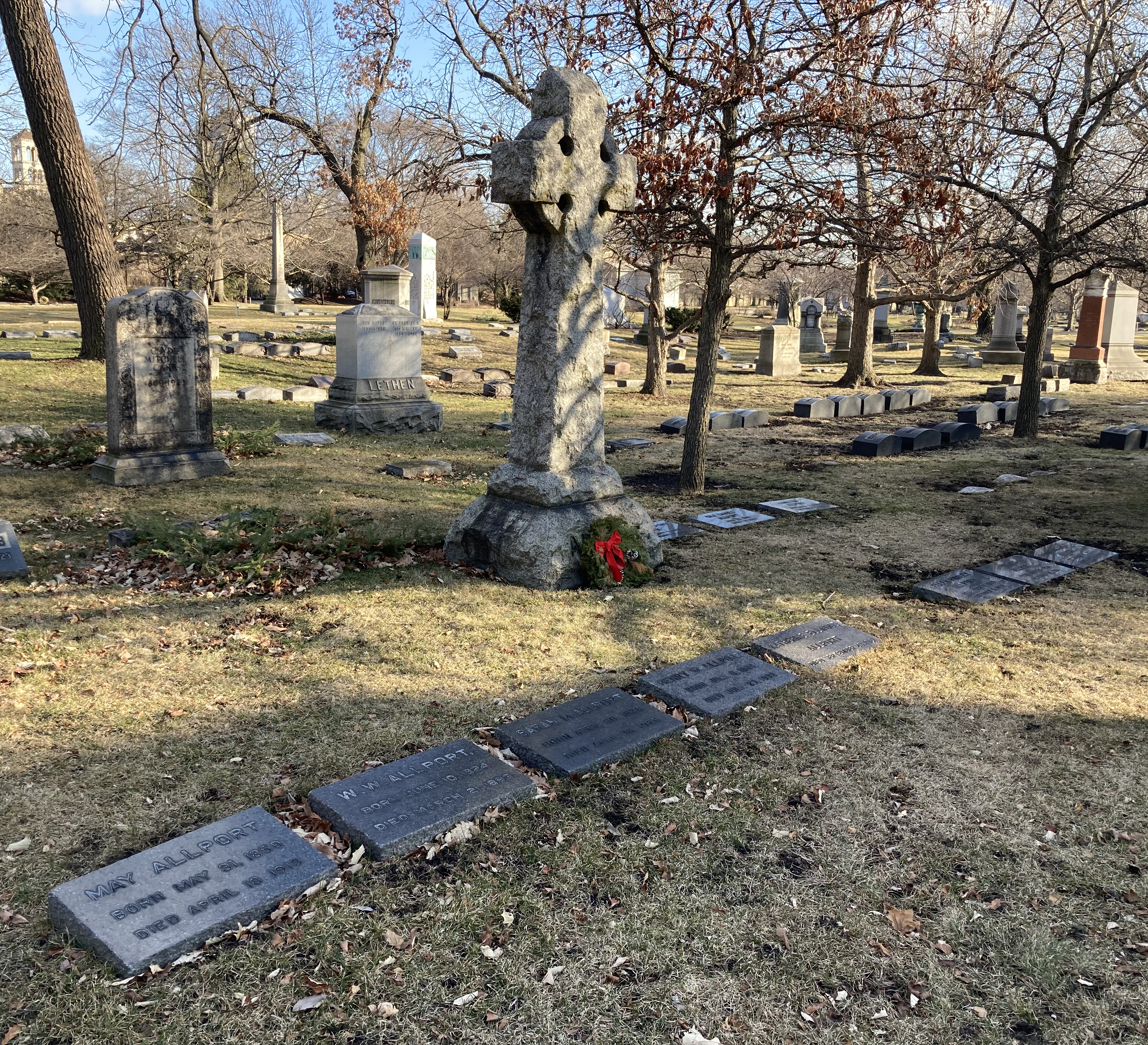
Allport's grave at Graceland Cemetery

Allport was elected president of the American Dental Association in 1886. He was vice president of the 9th International Medical Congress in 1887, where he co-founded the dental section. At the congress, he also successfully petitioned the American Medical Association to allow dentists to join the organization; this was later overturned. He led the effort to found the World's Columbian Dental Congress for the 1893 World's Columbian Exposition.

On December 24, 1847, Allport married Sarah Maria Haddock. They had three sons and one daughter. All three sons became physicians. In 1858, Allport designed the first dental registering ledger, featuring diagrams of the teeth for easy identification. The ledger was used by other dentists in the following decades. Allport was an early advocate of the use of crystalline gold and dental dams. He co-founded the Chicago Microscopical Club in 1868 and was its first president. He attended Grace Episcopal Church and was a Mason. Allport died on March 21, 1893, from meningitis. He was buried in Graceland Cemetery.
