= Florence McLandburgh =

American writer

- Born: April 22, 1850; Chillicothe, Ohio, U.S.
- Died: June 3, 1934 (aged 84); Akron, Ohio, U.S.
- Other name: McLandburgh Wilson
- Occupation: Writer

Florence McLandburgh (April 22, 1850 – June 3, 1934) was an American writer of fiction and poetry, sometimes using the pseudonym McLandburgh Wilson.

== Early life and education ==
McLandburgh was born in Chillicothe, Ohio, and lived in Chicago after 1863, the daughter of Henry McLandburgh and Susan Reynolds McLandburgh. Her older brother John was also a writer. She graduated from Dearborn Female Seminary in 1868.

== Career ==
McLandburgh's 1873 short story "The Automaton-Ear" is considered an early example of science fiction by an American woman, as it concerns an ear trumpet that can replay every sound ever made. Her 1876 collection of stories includes other tales with science fiction themes. One reviewer said the collection exhibited McLandburgh's "imaginative power", but that several of the stories were "too fanciful."

Poor health prevented McLandburgh from further fiction writing. Later in life she wrote poetry, often with humorous, patriotic or military themes, published in newspapers and magazines under the pseudonym "McLandburgh Wilson." She is credited with writing the lines "The optimist sees the doughnut, but the pessimist sees the hole."

== Publications ==
- "Possessed" (1871, later revised and retitled "The Feverfew")
- "Boydell: A Sketch" (1871)
- "The Christmas Tale of Paint Valley" (1873)
- "The Automaton-Ear" (1873)
- The Automaton Ear, and other sketches (1876)
- "Memorial Day" (1905, poem)
- "Back to the Land (1906, poem)
- "A Tale of Dead Love" (1906, poem)
- "Motherhood's Chant" (1914, poem)
- "Let the Women Be Heard"
- "The March of Woman Suffrage"
- The Little Flag on Main Street (1917, collected poems)
- "Rheims Cathedral" (1918, poem)
- "Hot Weather Poem" (1918, poem)

== Personal life ==
McLandburgh died in 1934, at the age of 83, in Akron, Ohio. Her gravestone in Graceland Cemetery in Chicago is shaped like a book resting on a pillow.
