= Li Fu Lee =

Chinese woman engineer (1904–1985)

- 李勵紱
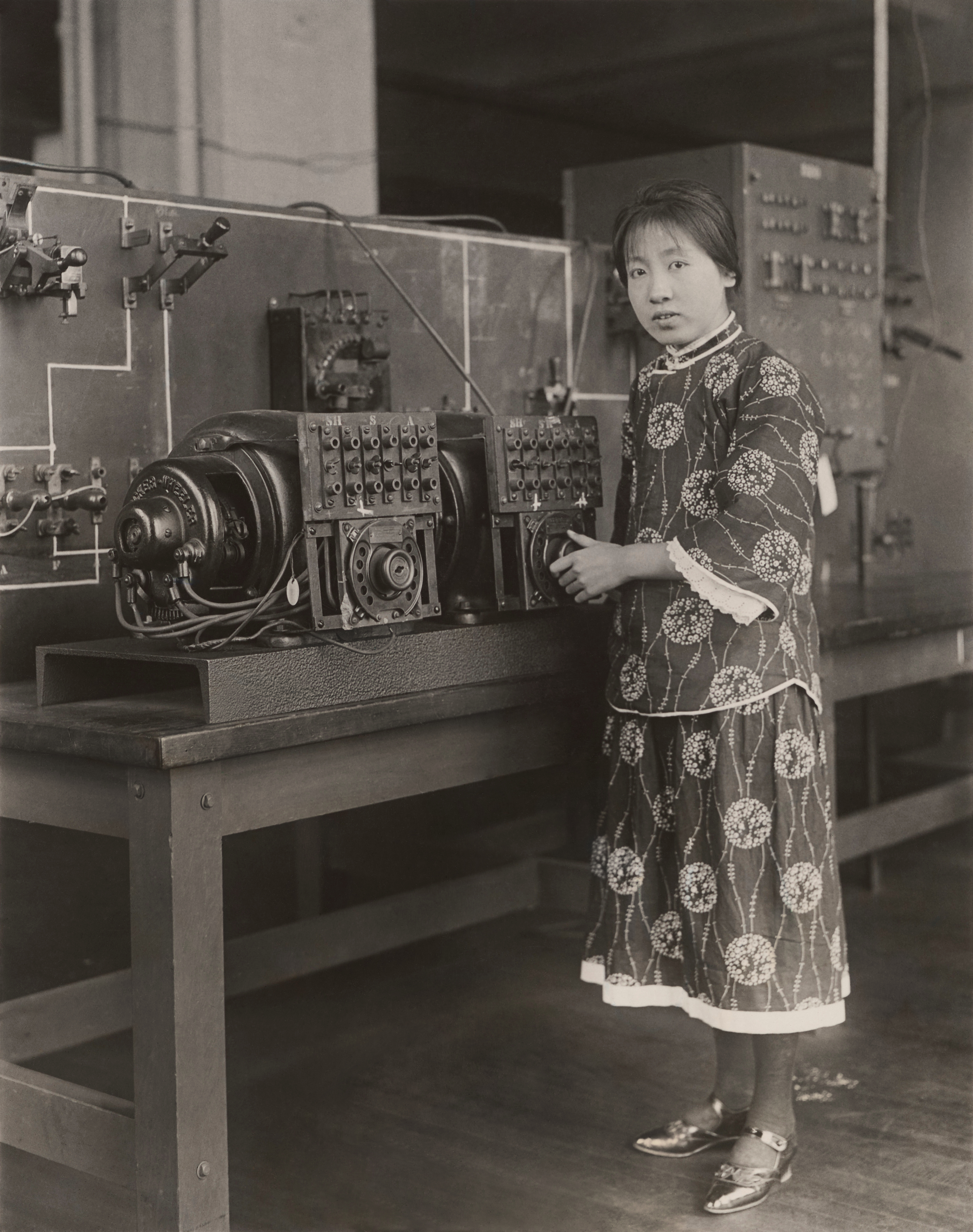
- Lee at the Massachusetts Institute of Technology's radio experiment station, 1925
- Born: May 3, 1904; Changdong, Zhili, Qing Empire
- Died: 1985 (aged 80–81) (Note: This is the death date found on her columbarium plaque at Graceland Cemetery. However, the plaque shows her birth date as 1906 instead of 1904.); Chicago, Illinois, United States (Note: This is presumed based on the fact that a columbarium plaque for her was installed at Graceland Cemetery, which is located in Chicago, Illinois, where she lived by 1978.)
- Education: National Technical School of China (BS); Massachusetts Institute of Technology (BS)
- Occupations: Engineer; teacher
- Known for: Being the first Chinese woman to attend the Massachusetts Institute of Technology
- Spouse: Kuan Tung (關東)
- Children: 4

Chinese name
- Traditional Chinese: 李勵紱
- Simplified Chinese: 李励绂
Transcriptions
Standard Mandarin
- Hanyu Pinyin: Lǐ Lìfú
- Wade–Giles: Li^{3} Li^{4}-fu^{2}
Yue: Cantonese
- Jyutping: Lei^{5} Lai^{6}-fat^{1}

Li Fu Lee (Chinese: 李勵紱; pinyin: Lǐ Lìfú; May 3, 1904 – 1985) was a Chinese engineer and teacher who was the first Chinese woman to attend the Massachusetts Institute of Technology (MIT). Her attendance, starting in 1925, was noted by numerous U.S. newspapers and publications, as was her choice of major: electrical engineering, said to be the most difficult of its day. One of 25 women who graduated from MIT in 1929, she was among the first women to earn a Bachelor of Science degree in electrical engineering there. (Note: The first woman was Helen Williams Hardy Blackwell, who graduated in 1924.)

== Biography ==
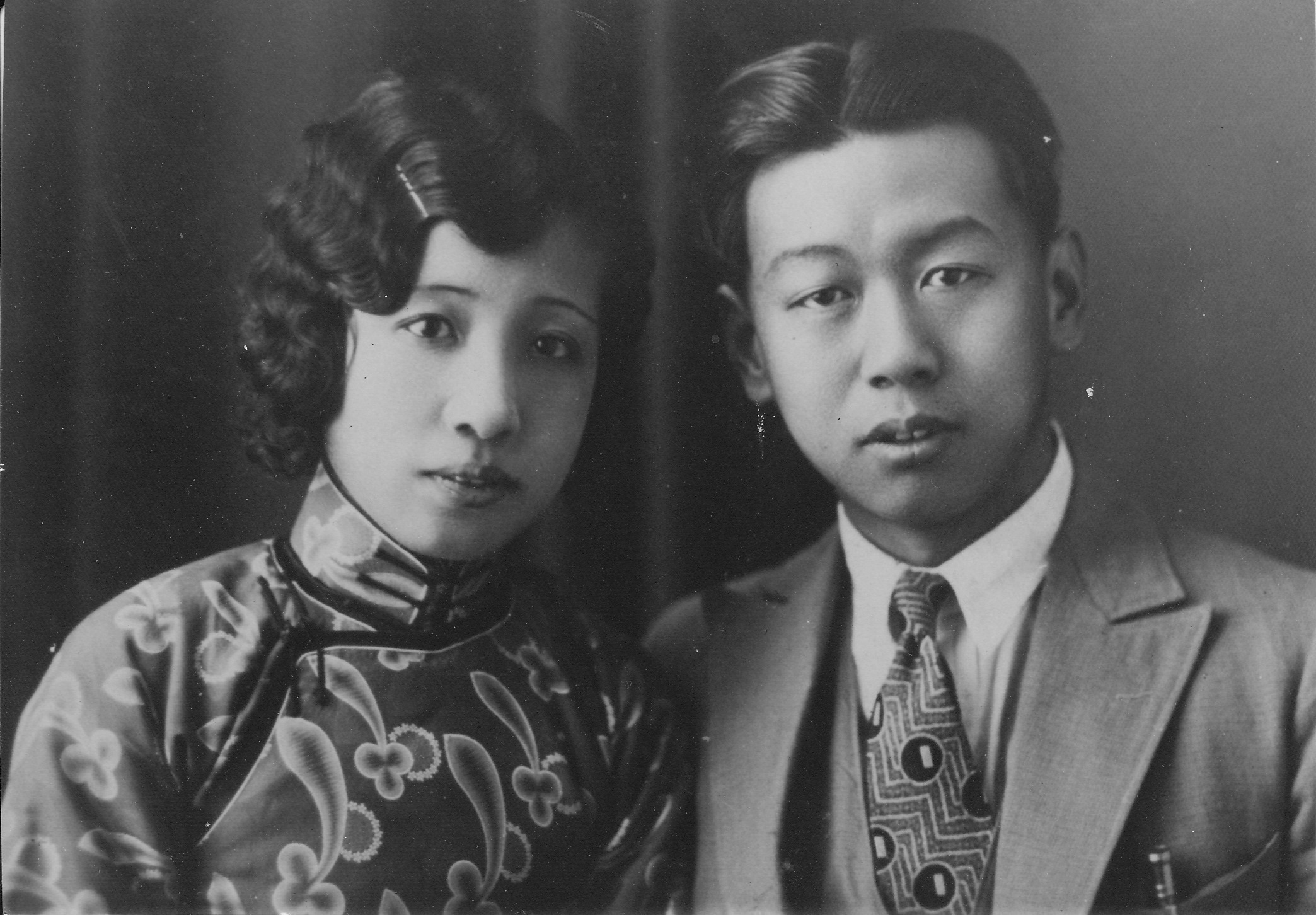
Lee and Kuan before going to MIT, c. 1925

Li Fu Lee was born on May 3, 1904, in Changdong, Hebei. She was Han Chinese and married Kuan Tung (Chinese: 關東; pinyin: Guān Dōng), who was from a prominent Manchu family. (Note: Kuan was born in 1902 in Zhangbei, Hebei.) She earned a Bachelor of Science from the National Technical School of China. By 1925, she lived in Beijing.

In 1925, Kuan was studying electrical engineering at the Massachusetts Institute of Technology (MIT). During his study, he decided he wanted Lee to study at MIT as well. Kuan returned to China with this in mind. Soon after Lee and Kuan had their wedding and honeymoon, in September, they moved to the US. They boarded the President McKinley and sailed from Shanghai to Seattle. Soon after they arrived, that same year, Lee enrolled at MIT in electrical engineering. The couple reportedly lived at 21 Lee St. in Cambridge.

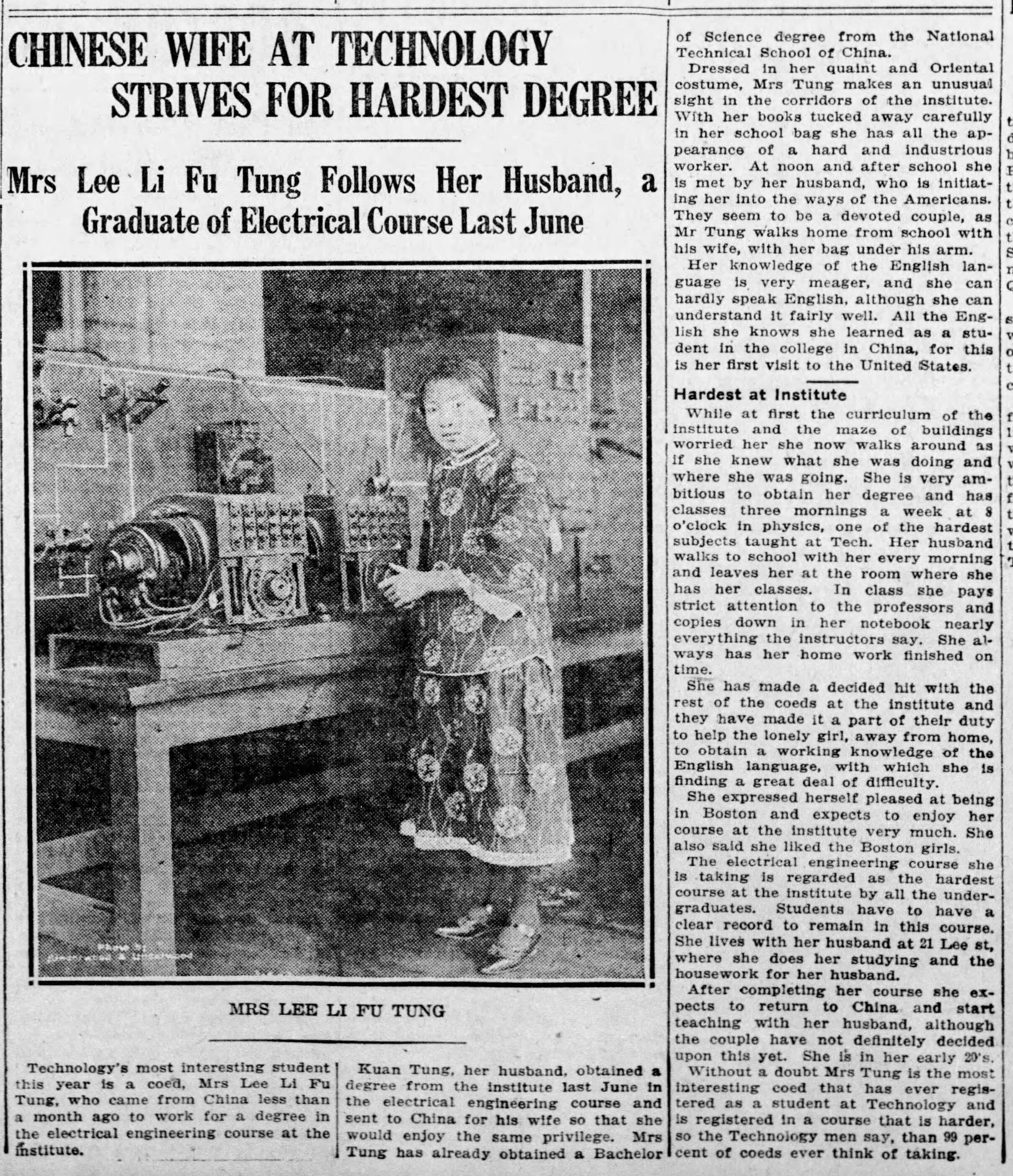
The report on Lee in The Boston Globe, October 20, 1925

Lee's arrival at MIT was reported by numerous media outlets, including by The Boston Globe, which published a story and photo of her on October 20, 1925. It declared her as MIT's "most interesting student" that year, saying: "Dressed in her quaint and Oriental costume, Mrs Tung makes an unusual sight in the corridors of the institute". Other newspapers across the US reported on the story, as did MIT's The Technology Review.

Lee was noted for being female and Chinese. In 1925, Chinese Students' Monthly said that she was "perhaps the first Chinese girl student studying engineering in this country that we know of". In February 1926, Popular Science Monthly published a piece about her. It symbolized Lee's attendance as progress for women's rights in China, saying: "At least there is one Chinese [Kuan Tung] who believes that woman [sic] should have a place outside the home as well as in". That same month, The Technology Review of MIT reran the photo of Lee first published in The Boston Globe and noted that she was "the first Chinese Co-ed ever to enter [MIT]".

Lee was also noted for studying electrical engineering at MIT, which was considered to be particularly challenging at the time. Chinese Students' Monthly said that "certainly it is epoch-making that she should choose 'the toughest course' in the long noted 'tough' institution". The Boston Globe said that "[t]he electrical engineering course she is taking is regarded as the hardest course at the institute by all the undergraduates". It reported that the male students at MIT noted that she was "registered in a course that is harder ... than 99 percent of coeds ever think of taking". She took classes in physics, which The Boston Globe reported as "one of the hardest subjects taught at [MIT]".

The Boston Globe said that Lee was dedicated to her studies. She had "all the appearance of a hard and industrious worker" and was "very ambitious to obtain her degree". She paid "strict attention" in class, recording "nearly everything the instructors sa[id]" in her notebook and that she always completed homework on time.

In September 1925, soon after enrolling at MIT, Lee was elected as the chairman of the social committee in the MIT Chinese Students' Club. Lee was the first and, at the time, the only woman in the club. The Boston Globe said that she "made a decided hit with" the female students at MIT. They helped improve Lee's knowledge of the English language. She reportedly studied at home and did the housework for Kuan. Kuan was apparently a devoted husband; he walked her to and from class daily, holding her bag. Lee was said to be particularly interested in electrical communications.

Lee and Kuan both graduated from MIT with Bachelors of Science in electrical engineering, in 1929 and 1927 respectively.

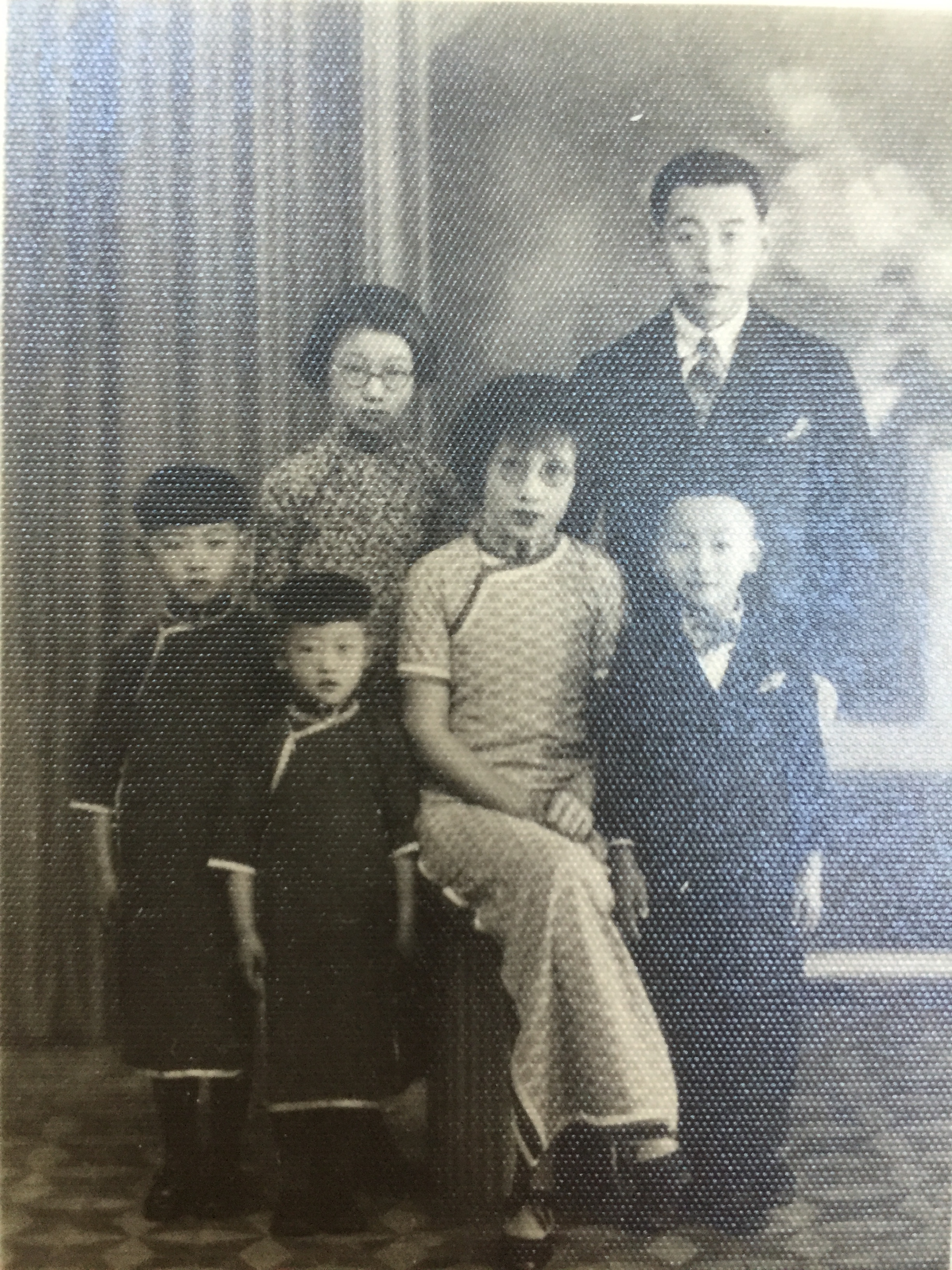
Lee and Kuan with their family in China

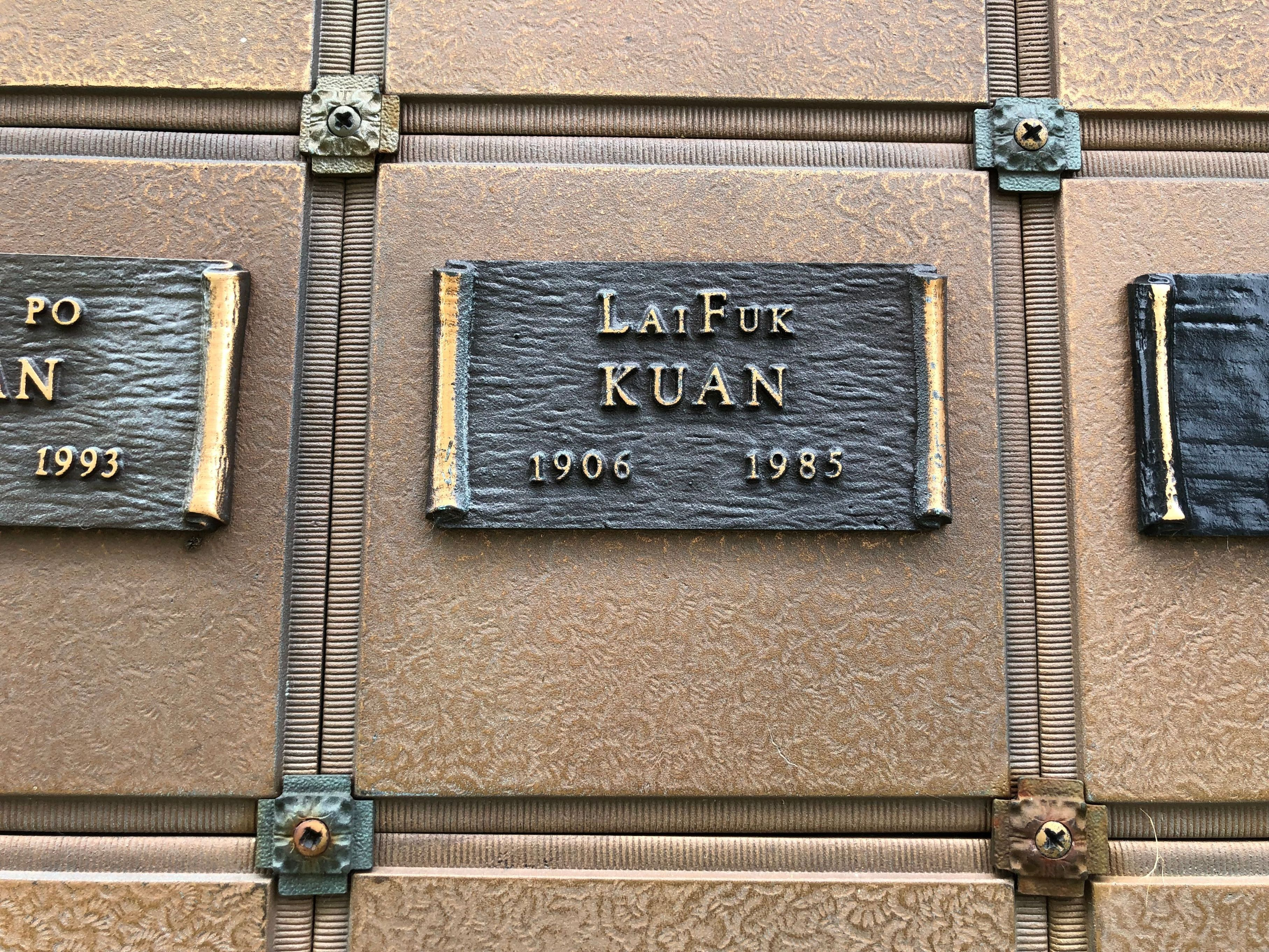
Lee's columbarium plaque at Graceland Cemetery

Little is known about Lee's career after graduating from MIT. Lee returned to China, where she became an engineer and taught at a university. She raised three daughters and a son with Kuan in China. After the outbreak of the Chinese Civil War, she and her family fled to Taiwan, where she earned a government position. She and her family then returned to the US. By 1978, she and Kuan lived in Chicago. A columbarium plaque for her is placed next to that of Kuan at Graceland Cemetery. Her plaque says that she died in 1985.

In 2022, Fahmida Chowdhury said that during a time which lacked female role models, family support may have been crucial for many of the earliest women's success in engineering, including that of Lee. Despite possibly not having a role model, a supportive family along with academic talents gave her strength.

== Legacy ==
Lee was the only known Chinese woman who studied at MIT from 1877 to 1931. She was one of the 25 women who graduated in 1929. She was one of the first women to earn a Bachelor of Science in electrical engineering at MIT. Her story was included as part of an exhibition commemorating the 140th anniversary in 2017 of the enrollment of the first Chinese student at MIT in 1877, called China Comes to Tech: 1877–1931. It was shown at MIT's Maihaugen Gallery from February 2017 to March 2018. The website China Comes to MIT, a supplement to the exhibition, has an article on her saying that she "was a pioneer among women, not only in China, but in the US as well". Chowdhury argued that women studying science and engineering had become commonplace in China and the lack of female role models may no longer be an issue, (Note: By the mid-1900s, two decades after Lee's graduation from MIT, China had hundreds of women engineers. Chowdhury (2022) cited Chu-yuan Cheng, who said: in Anshan, which was China's leading steel center, more than 600 women engineers, designers and technicians—all post-1949 graduates—were working in metallurgical, steel-rolling, power-generating, machine-building, and mining departments. Substantial numbers of women engineers and technicians also worked in the railroad system. Women civil and mechanical engineers served in railroad construction departments as well as rolling stock plants.) "the story of [Lee] remains relevant as an example of how it all began".

== See also ==
- Li Minhua – became the first woman to earn a PhD in mechanical engineering from MIT in 1948

== Works cited ==
- Bever, Marilynn A. (June 1976). The Women of M.I.T., 1871 to 1941: Who They Were, What They Achieved (PDF) (Bachelor thesis). Massachusetts Institute of Technology. Archived (PDF) from the original on May 30, 2022.
- Chowdhury, Fahmida N. (2022). "Without Role Models: A Few Pioneering Women Engineers in Asia". American Behavioral Scientist. 67 (9): 1074–1083. doi:10.1177/00027642221078508. S2CID 247234285.
- Massachusetts Institute of Technology, Chinese Students Directory for the Past Fifty Years (PDF). Cambridge Mass., U.S.A.: Massachusetts Institute of Technology, Chinese Students Directory. January 1931. Archived (PDF) from the original on March 8, 2023.
