= Isadore G. Jeffery =

American poet (1840–1919)

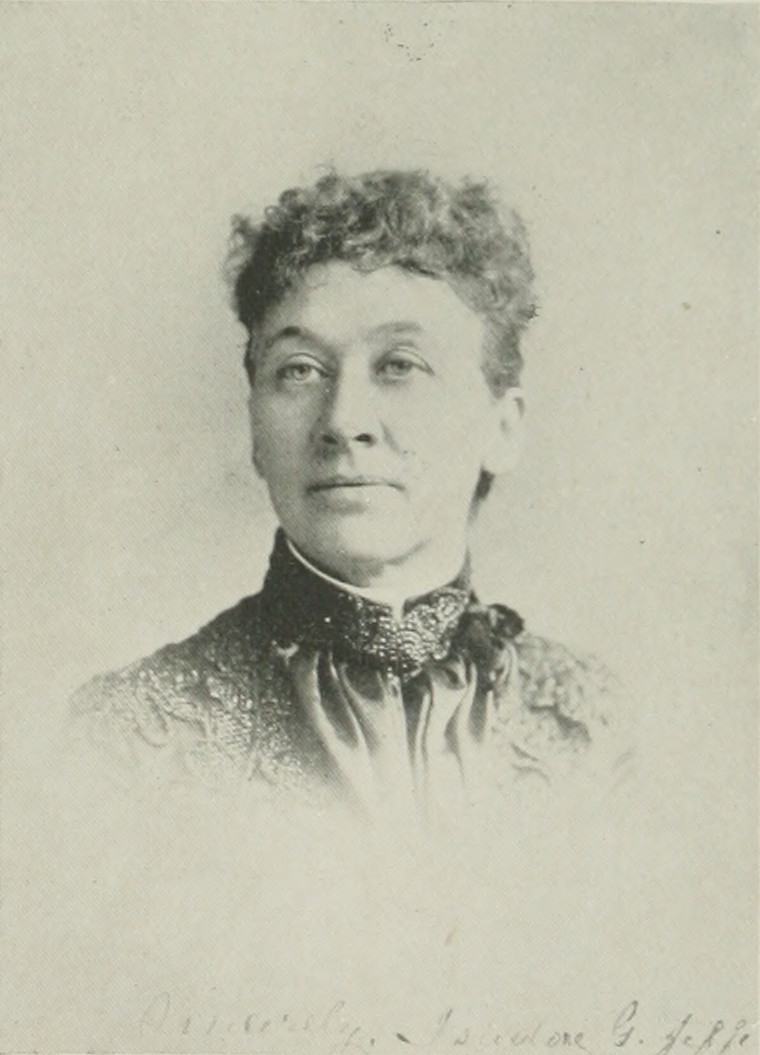
- Portrait from A Woman of the Century
- Born: Isadore Gilbert; June 21, 1840 Waukegan, Illinois, U.S.
- Died: February 23, 1919 (aged 78) Chicago, Illinois
- Resting place: Graceland Cemetery
- Occupation: religious and lyrical poet
- Genre: Christian poetry; hymn lyrics
- Subject: Christianity
- Spouse: William J. Jeffery (m. 1878)

Isadore Gilbert Jeffery (née, Gilbert; June 21, 1840 – February 23, 1919) was an American writer of Christian poetry and hymn lyrics. Though she wrote prolifically for the religious press, she did not publish a book. For years, she was a constant contributor to The Advance and held a responsible position in the office of that Chicago weekly.

== Biography ==
Isadore Gilbert was born in Waukegan, Illinois, June 21, 1840, where her parents lived for a time. Her parents were Samuel H. Gilbert and Cornelia M. (Davey) Gilbert (d. 1878. For many years their home was in Chicago, Illinois, where her father had extensive business interests. She was of English parentage.

Although she wrote since childhood for a large number of papers and periodicals, Jeffery never published a book. Several of her poems were published in Woman in Sacred Song.

In 1878, she married William J. Jeffery, then superintendent of the American District Telegraph and Telephone Service of Chicago. They had no children.

About two years after their marriage, he was injured and unable to work for three years. When he finally began to get about on crutches, Mrs. Jeffery accepted the position of stenographer in the office of The Advance, a popular Christian weekly, which she occupied for nearly six years.

Isadore Gilbert Jeffery died in Chicago, on February 23, 1919, and was buried at that city's Graceland Cemetery.

== Selected works ==
=== Lyrics ===
- "What Sound of Lofty Praise" (Philadelphia, 1868)

=== Religious poems ===
- "One by One"
- "Anchored"
- "Behold he prayeth"
- "Blight and bloom"
- "Del Gratia"
- "God's discipline"
- "Harvest Song"
- "Heavenly Ministries"
- "Hidden paths"
- "Higher"
- "Incognito"
- "In peace"
- "Set apart"
- "Show me the father" (1883)
- "Siste Viator" (1874)
- "Sympathy"
- "The Old and the New"
- "Thy will be done" (1882)
- "Unfledged"
- "Why?"
