= Lucy Mabel Hall-Brown =

American physician (1843–1907)

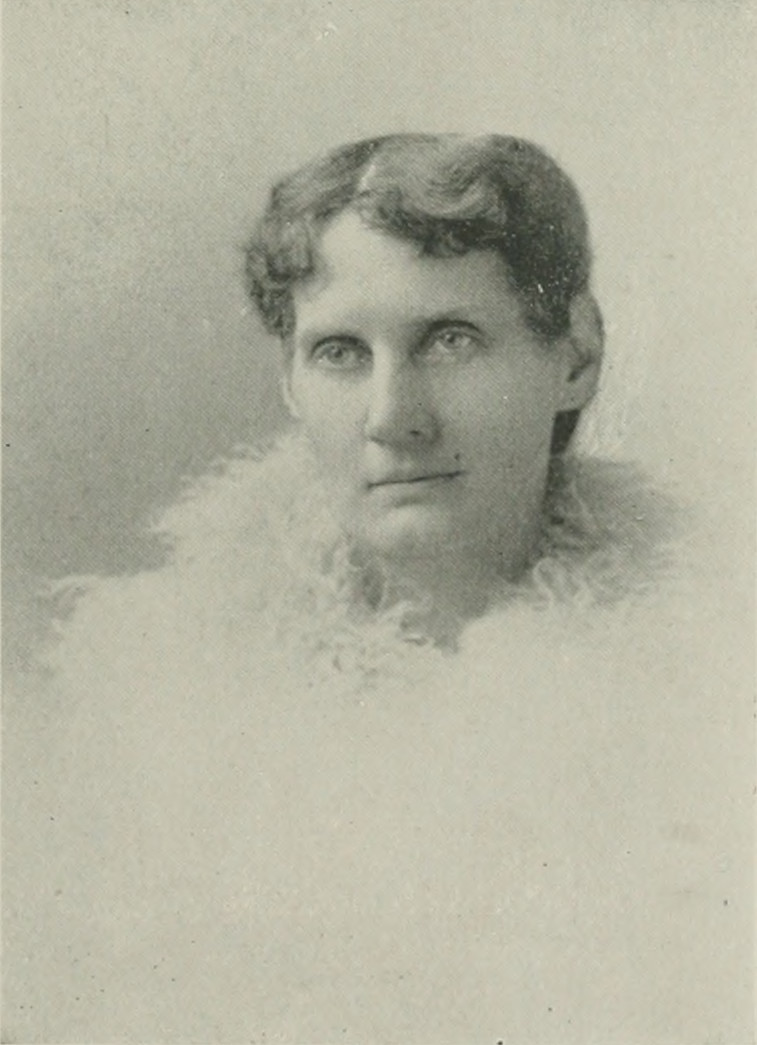
- Photo in A Woman of the Century
- Born: Lucy Mabel Hall; November 1843; Holland, Vermont, U.S.
- Died: August 1, 1907 (aged 63); Los Angeles, California, U.S.
- Education: Milton College, Dearborn Seminary, University of Michigan
- Occupations: physician, writer
- Spouse: Robert George Brown (m. 1891)

Lucy M. Hall-Brown (née, Hall; November 1843 – August 1, 1907) was an American physician and writer. She was a general practitioner and a physician at the Sherborn Reformatory for Women, now the Massachusetts Correctional Institution – Framingham. She was appointed by Governor Thomas Talbot, on Mosher's recommendation, resident-physician to the Massachusetts Reformatory and returned at once to take up the work. Later, she was offered the position of superintendent, which she declined. In 1883, Mosher, being appointed professor of physiology, hygiene and resident physician to Vassar College, asked to have Hall appointed to share the work, the two at this time starting a partnership, beginning their private work in Brooklyn and serving alternately at college. At the end of three years, Hall gave her entire time to practice in Brooklyn and continued so working until three years before her death.

== Early life and education ==
Lucy Mabel Hall was born in Holland, Vermont, (Note: Willard & Livermore state her place of birth was northern Vermont; Forbes notes Walden, Vermont; University of Michigan notes Wisconsin.) November 1843. She was a descendant of Governor Thomas Dudley of the Massachusetts Bay Colony. Of New England ancestry, her family can be traced back to European nobility. Hall's education began in Vermont, and continued in Milton College, Wisconsin, and in the Dearborn Seminary, Chicago, Illinois, from which she graduated.

Hall worked as a teacher for a few years, but soon after the death of her mother and father, she was persuaded by the family physician to study medicine. In the spring of 1878, Hall graduated with distinction from the medical school of the University of Michigan in Ann Arbor. She served for six months as assistant physician under Dr. Eliza Maria Mosher at the Massachusetts Reformatory Prison for Women. She then pursued post-graduate work in New York City and London, and was the first woman admitted to clinics in St Thomas' Hospital, London. She continued her medical observations in the hospitals and clinics of Leipzig. She interned at the Royal Lying-in and Gynecological Hospital of Prof. Franz von Winckel in Dresden, completing her studies and service abroad in 1879.

== Career ==
=== Physician ===
Returning to the United States, she was appointed physician to the State Reformatory for Women in Sherborn, Massachusetts by Massachusetts Governor Thomas Talbot. Connected with the prison was a hospital of 150 beds, likely to be filled from a body of from 300-400 inmates. Clara Barton, who succeeded Eliza Mosher as superintendent of the hospital at the reformatory, praised Hall's leadership in the hospital.

"Four years later, it became my privilege, as superintendent of that prison, to observe how that duty was discharged by its resident physician. Perfect system prevailed. No prisoner could enter upon her term without a careful diagnosis of her physical condition and administration of the needful treatment. If any trace of mental trouble manifested itself, the case was closely watched and tenderly cared for. The most difficult surgical operations were performed, not only without loss of life but with marked success. The control of the doctor over her patients, and these included from time to time nearly every inmate, was simply marvelous, and her influence throughout the entire institution not less remarkable. Among all classes, she moved as one born to command, that most successful of all command, the secret of which lies in tact, conscious ability and sympathy with mankind. So long as that prison remains a success, so long will the influence of Dr. Hall's early administration and example for good be felt there.

— Clara Barton

After nearly five years of service at the reformatory hospital, she was appointed superintendent by the governor and his council, though she declined the position, as its acceptance would necessitate the giving up of her medical work.

Soon after that, Hall formed a partnership with her colleague, Dr. Mosher, and together they began to practice in the city of Brooklyn, New York. In the autumn of 1884, they were appointed associate professors of physiology and hygiene and physicians at Vassar College, resigning in 1887. The same year, upon the occasion of the semicentennial commencement of the University of Michigan, Hall, as first Vice President of the Department of Medicine and Surgery, was called upon to preside at the meeting of that body. As her colleagues, many of the most eminent physicians and professors of the land were present. Afterward one of them remarked: "I had predicted that fifty years after the admission of women, a scene like this might occur. My prophecy has been anticipated by more than thirty years."

In the fall of 1887, Hall was appointed central committee delegate to the fourth International Conference of the Red Cross, of Geneva, held in Karlsruhe, Germany. She was invited as a guest at the court of Frederick I, Grand Duke of Baden, and Princess Louise of Prussia. That conference brought Hall into contact with many noted people of the European courts, where she was reportedly admired widely. At the end of Hall's visit, Princess Louise gave her various gifts as tokens of remembrance. Her standing in medical jurisprudence was recognized by the courts of justice in New York and she was often, called as an expert by the Supreme Court to take charge of examinations instituted by that tribunal.

After moving to Los Angeles, California, she made a visit to Japan, where she visited hospitals, schools, missions, prisons and police courts. On leaving the country, she was urged by Japanese officials of medical and public education to return and lecture on physiology and hygiene. She returned to Japan for several months in 1907, lecturing in various institutions. In a letter to a Brooklyn friend, quoted in the Brooklyn Eagle, she wrote:—

"To-morrow I go to Yokohama, to talk to a girls' club, foreign this time. I shall feel queerly to find myself talking to any girls not Japanese. I am to go to Kobe soon, and to Kyoto, and one other place not far away, and I am meeting a great many people, both native and foreign. A few days ago a gentleman, his uniform all a-glitter with orders, drove up and sent in his card. Baron Dr. Ishigaro; I met him just twenty years ago at a Red Cross conference, at Carlsruhe. He is now a very great man, and was lately decorated anew by the Emperor. He is a member of parliament. He begged to be allowed to do anything possible for me while I remain in Japan. A number of titled people have called, and I have visited them. It has been of interest to see this side of Japanese high life, and I have enjoyed it very much, but after all the real pleasure has been in getting a hold of these bright-eyed, hungrybrained, vivid and determined young Japanese women, and, more than all these, they are the ones who will give" this sturdy and brilliant nation the final touches needed to bring them up to a full realization of the ideals for which they are reaching and struggling. High and low, I love these people more every day. They are kind, cheerful, glad to serve you for the smallest favor with a sturdy, honest pride."

=== Writer ===
As a writer, Hall contributed many articles upon health topics to the best magazines and other periodicals of the day. Her writings were characterized by a strength of thought, knowledge of her subject and a certain vividness of expression which held the attention of the reader. Some of her most important articles were: “Unsanitary Condition of Country Houses” (Journal of Social Science, December, 1888); “Inebriety in Women” (Quarterly Journal for Inebriety, October, 1883); “Prison Experiences” (Medico Legal Journal, March, 1888); “Physical Training for Girls” (Popular Science Monthly, February, 1885); “Wherewithal Shall We Be Clothed” (American Woman's Journal, May, 1895).

== Affiliations ==
Hall was a member of the National Red Cross Society and a delegate to the International Red Cross Congress at Karlsruhe in 1887, and Vienna in 1897. She was also Fellow of the New York Academy of Medicine, and vice-president of the American Social Science Association. She was a delegate to the International Congress of Medicine at Paris in 1900, and was frequently appointed by the New York Boards as an expert in medical jurisprudence. Hall was a member of the Kings County Medical Society, of Brooklyn; of the Pathological Society; of the New York Medico-Legal Society, of which she has been treasurer; of the New York Academy of Anthropology; and of the American Social Science Association, of which she was also vice president. She was a fellow of the New York Academy of Medicine.

== Personal life ==
In 1891, Hall married Robert George Brown, an electrical engineer. In 1904, her health impaired by an increasing heart weakness, they removed to Los Angeles. She died in that city, August 1, 1907, of valvular disease of the heart, and inflammatory rheumatism.

== Selected works ==
- Bicycling and Health for Women, 1890
