= Eternal Silence (sculpture) =

Monument in Graceland Cemetery, Chicago, USA

- Dexter Graves Monument
- U.S. Historic district – Contributing property
- The monument in Graceland Cemetery

- Location within Chicago metropolitan area Location within Illinois Location within the United States
- Location: Chicago, Cook County, Illinois, United States
- Built: 1909
- Built by: Jules Bercham
- Sculptor: Lorado Taft
- Architectural style: Art Nouveau
- Part of: Graceland Cemetery (ID00001628)
- Added to NRHP: January 18, 2001

Eternal Silence, alternatively known as the Dexter Graves Monument or the Statue of Death, is a monument in Chicago's Graceland Cemetery and features a bronze sculpture of a hooded and draped figure set upon, and backdropped by, black granite. It was created by American sculptor Lorado Taft in 1909.

== History ==
The monument commemorates Dexter Graves, who in 1831 led a group of thirteen families from Ohio to settle in Chicago. Graves died in 1844, 75 years before the statue's creation and 16 years before Graceland Cemetery was founded. His body was presumably relocated from its original resting place at the old City Cemetery (the present site of Lincoln Park). The will of Graves' son Henry, who died in 1907, provided $250,000 (Note: equivalent to $8,638,393 in 2025) in funds for the monument and another $40,000 (Note: equivalent to $1,382,143 in 2025) intended to commemorate Henry's favorite race horse, Ike Cook. The Cook monument was to stand alongside a drinking fountain for horses in Washington Park. The horse monument never materialized, despite the construction of a model; instead, in 1920, another Taft piece, Fountain of Time, was built in its place and features a hooded figure similar to the one in Eternal Silence.

Ada Bartlett Taft's 1946 book Lorado Taft; Sculptor and Citizen lists Eternal Silence as one of the artist's most important works. Images of Eternal Silence have been used in other artworks, including those by Claes Oldenburg. One folktale claims that looking into the eyes of the statue's hooded figure causes the viewer to see a vision of his or her own death.

== Design ==
Eternal Silence has been called "eerie", "somber", "grim-looking", "mysterious", and "haunting". The bronze figure, based on traditional depictions of the Grim Reaper, is set against a black granite base and stands 10 feet (3.0 m) tall upon that base. The black granite provides contrast for the bronze statue, which is heavily oxidized because of its age. The cemetery used to shine the statue to return its true bronze patina but received many complaints and requests to return it to its more dramatic green sheen; the cemetery now keeps the statue in its preferred oxidized state. The hooded figure was influenced by Taft's own "ideas on death and silence". Historically speaking, the figure in Eternal Silence is related to the sculpted funeral procession around the Tomb of Philip the Bold in Dijon, France and the Adams Memorial by Augustus Saint-Gaudens in Washington, D.C. The statue has been noted as Graceland Cemetery's most "unforgettable" monument. The monument was designed by Taft and cast by Jules Bercham. On its base, Taft inscribed the north side with his signature; the south side is inscribed with Am. Art Bronze Foundry J. Bercham -Chicago-. The monument falls within Art Nouveau style.

== See also ==
- Black Hawk Statue
- List of public art in Chicago
- The Crusader
- Fountain of Time

== Bibliography ==
- Kiefer, Charles D.; Achilles, Rolf; Vogel, Neil A. (June 18, 2000). "Graceland Cemetery" (PDF). National Register of Historic Places Registration Form, HAARGIS Database. Illinois Historic Preservation Agency. Archived from the original (PDF) on January 20, 2021.
