= Melville Elijah Stone =

American news publisher and journalist (1848–1929)

Melville Elijah Stone, Sr.
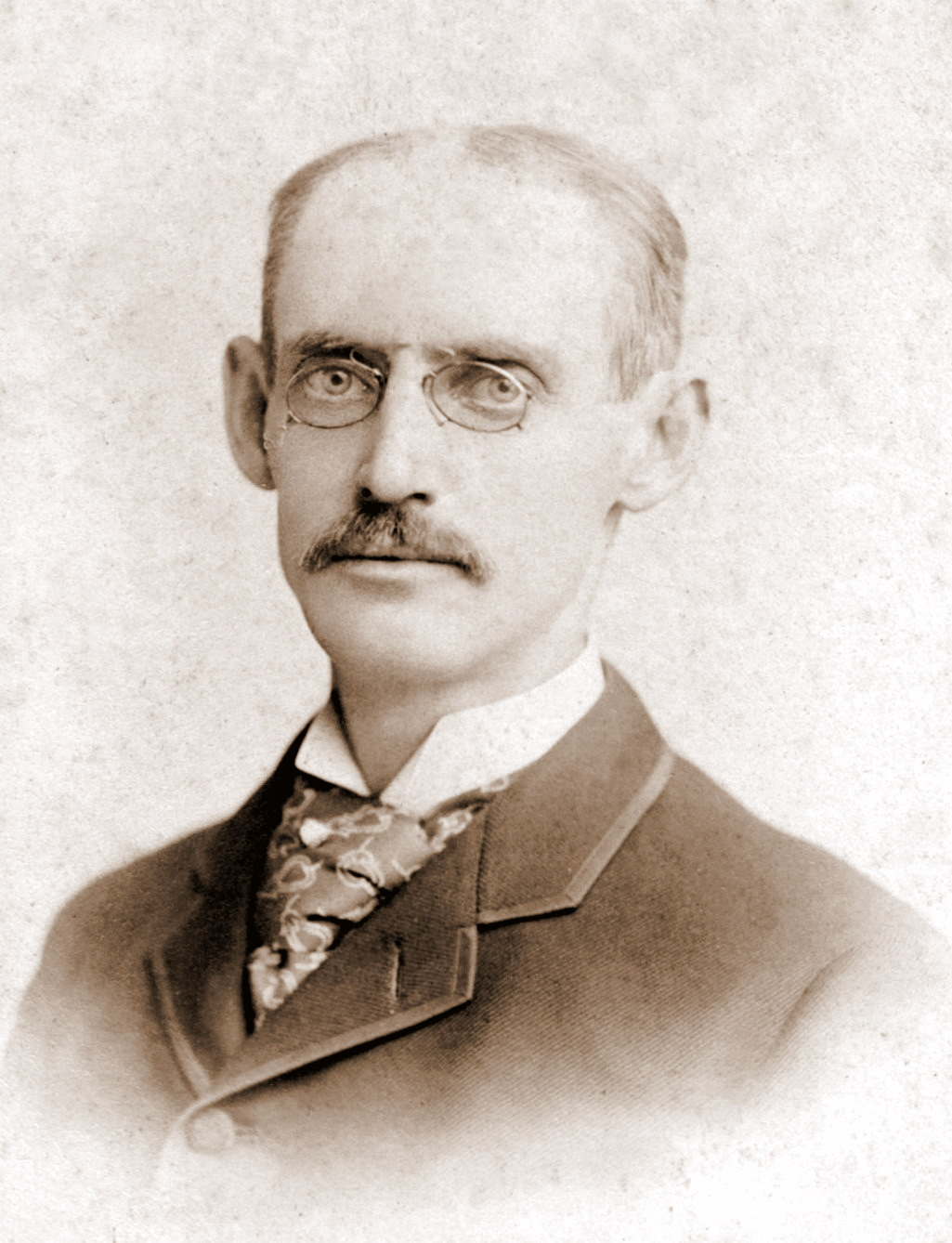
- Born: August 22, 1848; Hudson, Illinois
- Died: February 15, 1929 (aged 80); New York City
- Employer(s): Chicago Daily News; Associated Press
- Spouse: Martha Jameson McFarland
- Children: Melville Elijah Stone, Jr. Herbert Stuart Stone; Elizabeth Creighton Stone
- Parent(s): Elijah Stone; Sophia Creighton
- Relatives: Ormond Stone, brother

Melville Elijah Stone (August 22, 1848 – February 15, 1929) was an American newspaper publisher, the founder of the Chicago Daily News, and was the general manager of the reorganized Associated Press.

== Biography ==
Stone's parents were Reverend Elijah Stone, a Methodist minister, and Sophia Creighton. In 1876, Stone, who started out as a reporter, founded the first Chicago penny paper, the Chicago Daily News. In 1881, he established the Chicago Morning News (renamed the Chicago Record). Stone became general manager of the reorganized Associated Press in 1893, and under his direction it became one of the great news agencies. He retired in 1921. Stone died of hardening of the arteries in 1929.

== Legacy ==
Stone's son, Herbert Stone, married Mary Grigsby McCormick in 1900 and perished in the sinking of the luxury liner RMS Lusitania in 1915. His wife was daughter of William Grigsby McCormick of the McCormick family which included her uncle Robert Sanderson McCormick who married the daughter of the founder of the rival newspaper Chicago Tribune. Another son, Melville Elijah Stone, Jr., also predeceased him but he was survived by his wife, the former Martha McFarland of Chicago, whom he married on November 25, 1869, and his daughter Elizabeth Creighton Stone. Stone's brother was the astronomer Ormond Stone. A Liberty ship is named in his honor.

=== The penny myth ===
On the March 3, 2008 edition of The Rest of the Story, Paul Harvey, Jr. (substituting for his more famous father) related the story of Stone being responsible for the common use of pennies. The Chicago Daily News was not an initial success, as pennies were not widely used in 1876. According to Harvey, Stone convinced local merchants that employee theft could be reduced if the price of item was sold for 99¢ instead of $1.00 etc., forcing employee to make change for sales and less likely to steal money since it required further calculation. Merchants began experimenting with a penny price drop in their goods, meeting with success among their patrons. An increase in pennies, thought Stone, would help the circulation of his penny paper. When merchants began running low on pennies, Stone purchased several barrels of pennies from the Mint, further increasing their use within the Chicago area.

This story is also related in Scot Morris's The Book of Strange Facts and Useless Information, though there is some doubt as to its veracity.
