= Thomas Bowman (Evangelical Association bishop) =

American bishop of the Evangelical Association (1836–1923)

Thomas Bowman (May 28, 1836 – 1923) was a bishop of the Evangelical Association, elected in 1875.

== Biography ==
He was born in Lehigh Township, Pennsylvania and attended Vanderveers Seminary in Easton, Pennsylvania. He entered the traveling ministry of the Eastern Pennsylvania Annual Conference of the Evangelical Association in 1859. He served as a pastor of various congregations until 1875, serving as a presiding elder in the same conference, 1870–1875.

He was elected to the episcopacy in 1875. Beginning in 1896, he also served as the principal of the Union Biblical Institute of his denomination in Naperville, Illinois.

Bowman characterized his own theological position as Arminian-evangelical.

== See also ==
- List of bishops of the United Methodist Church
