= Ormond Stone =

American astronomer and mathematician

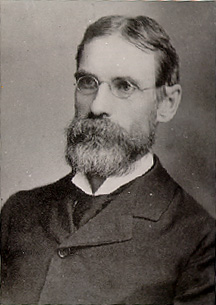
- Born: January 11, 1847; Pekin, Illinois, US
- Died: January 17, 1933 (aged 86); Centreville, Virginia, US
- Education: Old University of Chicago
- Occupations: Astronomer; Mathematician
- Spouses: Catherine Flagler; Mary Florence Brennan
- Relatives: Melville E. Stone, brother

Ormond Stone (January 11, 1847 – January 17, 1933), was an American astronomer, mathematician and educator. He was the director of Cincinnati Observatory and subsequently the first director of the McCormick Observatory at the University of Virginia, where he trained a significant number of scientists. He served as the editor of the Annals of Mathematics and towards the end of his life made donations which led to the founding of the Fairfax Public Library System.

== Early years ==
Stone was born in Pekin, Illinois, to Methodist minister Elijah and Sophia Louise (Creighton) Stone. While attending Chicago High School, he met Truman Henry Safford, an astronomer at the recently completed Dearborn Observatory. Stone became his pupil, quickly beginning his lifelong interest in astronomy. In 1866, Stone enrolled at the Old University of Chicago, graduating with a degree of master's degree in 1870. Working his way through school, he served as an instructor in 1867–1868 at Racine College in Wisconsin, then at the Northwestern Female College (which is now a part of Northwestern University) at Evanston, Illinois in 1869. Also that year, he participated in what would be the first of three eclipse expeditions in his lifetime. It was on this trip to Des Moines, Iowa, with Safford that he met astronomers from the United States Naval Observatory (USNO). He would end up being in charge of the later two expeditions, the first in 1878, when he led the USNO expedition to Colorado, and the May 28, 1900 eclipse, when he led the McCormick Observatory expedition to Winesboro, South Carolina. Upon graduating from the University of Chicago in 1870, he accepted an assistantship at the USNO, where he stayed until 1875. He was assigned to the Meridian Circle, under William Harkness. His tenure there coincided with the arrival of the 26-inch (660 mm) Alvan Clark refractor at the Naval Observatory. This telescope was essentially a twin to the future McCormick Refractor. In 1871, he married Catherine Flagler of Washington, D.C.

== Cincinnati Observatory ==
In 1875, Stone accepted the directorship of the Cincinnati Observatory, having received a recommendation from Simon Newcomb. While there, he instituted a program of discovering new southern double stars and was the first to establish standard time for an American city, and he pushed for the adoption of Standard Time Belts (or zones, as we now know them).

== McCormick Observatory ==
In 1882, Stone was offered the position of director at the brand new observatory being built at the University of Virginia, and was accompanied from Cincinnati by John Jones and Frank P. Leavenworth. Stone oversaw the final stages of construction on the observatory, which was completed in 1885, but began astronomical work almost immediately upon his arrival in Charlottesville. Stone's work focused largely on observing nebulae, southern variables and double stars.

As director, Stone's responsibilities included fundraising, which he detested and did very poorly. Though the observatory was always short of funds, he used funds donated by William Henry Vanderbilt to establish three fellowships, $350 for a year, to pay for assistants at the observatory. The list of Vanderbilt Fellows who worked under Stone was an impressive one, and included astronomers, university presidents, professors and professionals in various fields, including:

- Francis P. Leavenworth, Director of Haverford Observatory, Professor of Astronomy at the University of Minnesota
- Harry Y. Benedict, Tenth President of the University of Texas at Austin
- Edgar Odell Lovett, first President of Rice Institute (now Rice University)
- Heber Doust Curtis, director of Lick Observatory and Allegheny Observatory
- James Park McCallie, founder of The McCallie School
- George F. Paddock, Assistant Astronomer at Lick Observatory
- Charles P. Olivier, Director of Flower and Cook Observatory and Chair of the Astronomy Department, University of Pennsylvania
- Herbert R. Morgan, astronomer at the United States Naval Observatory
- Ralph Elmer Wilson, astronomer at Dudley Observatory and Mount Wilson Observatory

Stone remained at the McCormick Observatory until 1912. In his time there, he taught various astronomy courses for the university; founded the Annals of Mathematics in 1884, funding the publication with his own money, and edited the journal until 1899 (after which he served on the editorial board); founded the Philosophical Society at the university; and spent much of the final ten years of his directorship in the cause for secondary education in Virginia. He was a member of the American Association for the Advancement of Science (Member: 1875; Fellow: 1876; chair, Committee on Standard Time: 1880; Member of Committee on Stellar Magnitudes: 1880; Vice-president, Astronomy and Mathematics: 1887; Vice-president of Section A: Astrometry, of Department 11: Astronomy: 1888; Chair: 1901 Councilor, Section A, Mathematics and Astronomy: 1902–1905; Sectional Committee, Section A: 1905–1907; Emeritus Life Member: 1927), the American Astronomical and Astrophysical Society, now known as the American Astronomical Society (Councilor 1899–1909), and the American Mathematical Society (Councilor 1897), among many other academic societies. He served on the Board of Visitors (as Secretary) for the United States Naval Observatory from 1901 to 1903, served on the first Advisory Committee on Mathematics for the Carnegie Institution of Washington starting in 1902, and was a trustee of Harrisonburg Normal College (now James Madison University). He also maintained contacts with people of influence across the country, including his brother Melville E. Stone, the founder of the Chicago Daily News, who became well known as the General Manager of Associated Press.

== Fairfax County Public Library ==
He retired on a stipend from the Carnegie Foundation in 1912 to a 30-acre (120,000 m^{2}) farm in Centreville, Virginia. Stone attended a local, little stone Methodist church on Braddock Road, now known as the Church of the Ascension, Anglican. His wife died in 1914, and he later married Mary Florence Brennan of Lansing, Michigan. He brought Mary back to Centreville, along with her two sisters, Grace and Elizabeth. He continued to be active in the educational, religious and social problems of his local community and the state.

He served as Vice President of the Virginia State Teachers' Association, and was a leader in the movement to improve Virginia's public school system (in 1991, Ormond Stone Middle School was opened in Centreville to honor his work).

In November 1929, Professor Stone and his friend, lawyer Thomas Keith, approached the Fairfax County Board of Supervisors to request space to begin a library. The county provided no funds, but a small space in an old office in the courthouse. It was the first step in the eventual establishment of the Fairfax County Public Library System. Stone spent much of his last years gathering and organizing donated books for this small library.

== Death ==
He died just six days after his eighty-sixth birthday, when he was struck and instantly killed by the driver of a C&P Telephone Company vehicle while walking along the road near his farm in Centreville.

== See also ==
- Ormond Stone Middle School
- Discoveries by Ormond Stone
