= List of colleges and universities named after people =

Many colleges and universities are named after people. Namesakes include the founder of the institution, financial benefactors, revered religious leaders, notable historical figures, members of royalty, current political leaders, and respected teachers or other leaders associated with the institution. This is a list of higher education institutions named for people.

== Institutions named for people associated with the institution ==
=== Founders or their family members ===
The following institutions are named for the individual people who are credited as their founders. A few institutions were named by the founder in honor of a parent, child, spouse, or other close family member.

Institution	Namesake	Notes
Aga Khan University, Karachi, Pakistan	His Highness Prince Karim Aga Khan IV	University was established by the Aga Khan in 1983 as part of the Aga Khan Development Network.
Albert Ludwig University of Freiburg, Germany	Albert VI, Archduke of Austria and Louis I, Grand Duke of Baden	
Alice Lloyd College, Kentucky, US	Alice Spencer Geddes Lloyd	Journalist turned social reformer; founded the school in 1923 as Caney Junior College.
Amrita Vishwa Vidyapeetham, India	Mata Amritanandamayi Devi	University's first chancellor and famed Indian spiritual leader
Anglia Ruskin University, Cambridge and Chelmsford, England	John Ruskin	Founded as the Cambridge School of Art by John Ruskin in 1858. Renamed Cambridgeshire College of Arts and Technology in 1960. Merged into Anglia Higher Education College in 1989. Merged into Anglia Polytechnic in 1991. Renamed Anglia Ruskin University in 2005.
Annamalai University, Tamil Nadu, India	Raja Annamalai Chettiar	Philanthropist who established several higher education institutions
Audrey Cohen College, New York, US	Audrey Cohen	Educator; established the institution in 1964 as the Women's Talent Corps
Babson College, Massachusetts, US	Roger Babson	Entrepreneur and business theorist; founded the school in 1919 as Babson Institute.
Bangabandhu Sheikh Mujibur Rahman Agricultural University, Gopalgonj, Bangladesh	Sheikh Mujibur Rahman	Father of the nation of Bangladesh.
Bard College, New York, US	John Bard	John Bard and his wife founded the college as St. Stephen's College.
Baylor University, Texas, US	Robert Emmett Bledsoe Baylor	Texas judge who is regarded as one of three founders of the university.
Begum Rokeya University, Rangpur, Bangladesh	Begum Rokeya	Begum Rokeya Sakhawat Hossain, Bengali female writer, educator, social activist, and advocate of women's rights.
Bentley University, Massachusetts, US	Harry C. Bentley	Founder
Berklee College of Music, Massachusetts, US	Lee Eliot Berk	Son of founder Lawrence Berk
Berry College, Georgia, US	Martha McChesney Berry	Founder
Bethune-Cookman University, Florida, US	Mary McLeod Bethune and Alfred Cookman	Mary McLeod Bethune founded the school in 1904 and merged with Cookman Institute named after Alfred Cookman in 1935.
Birla Institute of Technology, Mesra (BIT), Mesra, Ranchi, Jharkhand, India	B. M. Birla	The founder was a member of the Birla family, one of the foremost business houses in India.
Birla Institute of Technology and Science (BITS), Pilani, Rajasthan, India	Ghanshyam Das Birla	The founder was a member of the Birla family, one of the foremost business houses in India
Bishop College, Texas, US	Nathan Bishop	Educator who assisted with the founding of this institution for education of freed slaves
Blackburn College, Illinois, US	Gideon Blackburn	Preacher Blackburn, a former president of Centre College, was working to establish the new school at the time of his death in 1838, but opening of the school was delayed until 1859.
Bob Jones University, South Carolina, US	Bob Jones, Sr.	Evangelist preacher Bob Jones founded Bob Jones University in 1927.
Bond University, Queensland, Australia	Alan Bond	High-profile businessman Alan Bond founded Bond University in 1987.
Booth University College, Winnipeg, Manitoba	William and Catherine Booth	Namesakes were the founders of The Salvation Army, which established the college in 1982.
Bradley University, Illinois, US	Family of Lydia Moss Bradley	Lydia Moss Bradley founded the school in 1897 in memory of her husband Tobias and their six children, all of whom had died early and suddenly, leaving her a childless widow.
Brigham Young University, Utah	Brigham Young	President of the Church Brigham Young personally purchased the buildings of the failed University of Deseret, forming Brigham Young Academy in 1876. Brigham Young University campuses in Hawaii and Idaho now also bear his name.
Bryant University, Rhode Island, US	John Collins Bryant & Henry Beadman Bryant	Namesakes were founders of Bryant & Stratton College of which a spun-off branch became Bryant University
Butler University, Indiana, US	Ovid Butler	Established in 1855 as North Western Christian University; renamed in 1875 in honor of its founder, a Restoration Movement preacher and abolitionist who had achieved his goal of forming a Christian university in Indiana
Campbell University, North Carolina, US	James Archibald Campbell	Founded in 1887 as a community school named Buies Creek Academy; became a junior college in 1926 and was renamed in honor of its founder, a local preacher. The school became Campbell College in 1961 when it became a four-year school, and Campbell University in 1979 with the opening of its law school.
Carnegie Mellon University, Pennsylvania, US	Andrew Carnegie, Andrew W. Mellon, and Richard B. Mellon	The university was formed by the merger of Carnegie Institute of Technology, founded in 1900 by industrialist and philanthropist Andrew Carnegie, and the Mellon Institute of Industrial Research, founded in 1913 by Andrew and Richard Mellon.
Case Western Reserve University, Ohio, US	Leonard Case, Jr.	The university was formed by the affiliation of Case School of Engineering (originally Case School of Applied Science, founded by Case in 1877) and Western Reserve University.
Charles University, Prague, Czech Republic	Charles IV, Holy Roman Emperor	Founded in 1348 by the Emperor
Chitkara University, Punjab and Chitkara University, Himachal Pradesh	Ashok Chitkara and Madhu Chitkara	The universities was established by the Chitkara Educational Trust and was founded by Ashok K. Chitkara and Madhu Chitkara.
Chulalongkorn University, Bangkok, Thailand	King Chulalongkorn the Great	Established in 1917 by King King Vajiravudh (Rama VI) of Siam (Thailand) and named in honor of his father.
Clark University, Massachusetts, US	Jonas Gilman Clark	Clark was both the founder and principal benefactor of the university, making major gifts in his lifetime and leaving a bequest that totaled about $2,915,000 in 1900.
Clarkson University, New York, US	Thomas Streatfeild Clarkson	Entrepreneur who was killed in 1894 trying to save a worker in his sandstone mining business. His family started the college in his memory.
Cleary University, Howell, MI US	Patrick Roger Cleary	Founded institution in 1883 as Cleary School of Penmanship
Cogswell College, California, US	Henry D. and Caroline Cogswell	Henry Cogswell, who founded the college in 1887 with his wife Caroline, was a dentist and temperance crusader. The defunct Henry Cogswell College also bore his name.
Coker College, South Carolina, US	James Lide Coker	Coker College began in 1894 as Welsh Neck High School founded by James Lide Coker. In 1908, Coker provided leadership for the conversion of the school to Coker College for Women. Men have attended since World War II.
Cooper Union for the Advancement of Science and Art, New York, US	Peter Cooper	Industrialist, inventor, and politician who conceived of the idea of having a free institute in New York. He erected a building and endowed the institution, which he presented to the City of New York in 1858.
Cornell College, Iowa, US	William Wesley Cornell	College was established as Iowa Conference Seminary in 1853 and renamed in 1857 in honor of iron tycoon Cornell, who is sometimes described as the school's founder.
Cornell University, New York, US	Ezra Cornell	University was founded in 1865 by Ezra Cornell and Andrew Dickson White
Creighton University, Nebraska, US	Edward Creighton	Founded in 1878 through a gift from Mary Lucretia Creighton, who directed in her will that a school be established in memory of her husband.
Dalhousie University, Nova Scotia, Canada	George Ramsay, 9th Earl of Dalhousie	Founded in 1818 by Ramsay, the British Lieutenant-Governor of Nova Scotia
Dharmsinh Desai University, Gujarat, India	Dharmsinh Desai	Member of Parliament, educationist and social worker who established the institution in 1968
Drexel University, Pennsylvania, US	Anthony Joseph Drexel I	Philadelphia financier and philanthropist who founded the school in 1891
Emerson College, Massachusetts, US	Charles Wesley Emerson	Founded the college in 1880 as a school of oratory
Egerton University, Njoro, Kenya	Maurice Egerton, 4th Baron Egerton	Founded in 1939 on land donated by the British farmer
Dr. Hari Singh Gour University, India	Dr. Hari Singh Gour	Founded the institution in 1946 as University of Saugar, using his life savings
Eberhard Karls University of Tübingen, Baden-Württemberg, Germany	Count Eberhard VI and Duke Karl Eugen	Eberhard founded the university in 1477; in 1769 Duke Karl Eugen appended his first name to that of the founder.
Ferris State University, Michigan, US	Woodbridge N. Ferris	Educator who founded the institution in 1884; later served as governor of Michigan and as a US Senator
Friedrich-Alexander University of Erlangen-Nuremberg, Germany	Frederick, Margrave of Brandenburg-Bayreuth and Alexander, Margrave of Brandenburg-Ansbach	
Fundação Armando Alvares Penteado, São Paulo, Brazil	Count Armando Álvares Penteado	Brazilian philanthropist and art educator
Gallaudet University, District of Columbia, US	Thomas Hopkins Gallaudet	Established by his son, Edward Miner Gallaudet. World's only university geared for deaf people.
Georg August University of Göttingen, Germany	George II of Great Britain	Elector of Hanover
George Fox University, Oregon, US	George Fox	Founder of the Religious Society of Friends (Quakers)
GIK Institute, Topi, Pakistan	Ghulam Ishaq Khan	Named after a former president of Pakistan
Gibbs College	Katharine Gibbs	Founder of the institution, now operated as a chain of for-profit colleges
Gnessin State Musical College, Moscow, Russia	Sisters Eugenia, Helena and Maria Gnessin	Established in 1895 by the sisters, who were pianists
Gordon College (Massachusetts), US	Adoniram Judson Gordon	Founder, in 1889; the college was originally known as the Boston Missionary Training School
Gordon-Conwell Theological Seminary (GCTS), multiple US locations	Adoniram Judson Gordon and Russell Conwell	Gordon started the Gordon Divinity School in Massachusetts in 1889; Conwell (also founder of ) started the Conwell School of Theology at Temple University; the two schools merged in 1969.
Goucher College, Maryland, US	John Goucher and Mary Fisher Goucher	Established in 1885 as The Woman's College of Baltimore, renamed in honor of its founders in 1910
Habib University, Karachi, Pakistan	Habib Family, House of Habib	Established by the Habib Family in 2010 as Pakistan's premier liberal arts and sciences university.
Harvey Mudd College, California, US	Harvey Seeley Mudd	Benefactor who was involved in planning of the new institution, but died before it opened
Hajee Mohammad Danesh Science & Technology University, Dinajpur, Bangladesh	Hajee Mohammad Danesh	Bangladeshi peasant leader and politician.
Hobart and William Smith Colleges, New York, US	John Henry Hobart & William Smith	Founded in 1796 as Geneva Academy, becoming a college in 1822 under the leadership of Episcopal bishop John Henry Hobart. It was renamed in his honor in 1852. William Smith College was established as a coordinate college for women in 1906 with gifts from nurseryman William Smith.
Houghton University, New York, US	Willard J. Houghton	Wesleyan Methodist minister who founded the institution in 1883
Hunter College, New York, US	Thomas Hunter	Founder
Hult International Business School, Boston, San Francisco, London, Dubai, Shanghai	Bertil Hult	
John A. Logan College, Illinois, US	Gen. John A. Logan	General John A. Logan was a resident of Southern Illinois, a Union volunteer in the Civil War, and a member of the US House of Representatives in 1858 as a democrat and again after the war in 1868 as a republican. The college mascot is the "Volunteers".
Johnson University, Tennessee, US	Ashley S. Johnson	Renamed from Johnson Bible College to current name in 2011
Johnson & Wales University, US	Gertrude I. Johnson and Mary T. Wales	
Kalasalingam University, Tamil Nadu, India	Arulmigu Kalasalingam	Founded by Mr. Kalasalingam
Kameshwar Singh Darbhanga Sanskrit University, Bihar, India	Kameshwar Singh	In 1961 Maharaja Kameshwar Singh donated his ancestral house, Anandbag Palace, a rich library, and surrounding land to establish a Sanskrit university.
King's College London	King George IV	Founded by King George IV in 1829
King Saud University, Riyadh, Saudi Arabia	King Saud	Founded by King Saud in 1957
Lane College, Tennessee, US	Isaac Lane	Lane was a bishop of the Colored Methodist Episcopal Church, which sponsored the school's establishment in 1882.
LeMoyne–Owen College, Tennessee, US	Francis Julius LeMoyne & S. A. Owen	LeMoyne (1798–1879), a Pennsylvania doctor, donated $20,000 to the American Missionary Association in 1870 to help establish the institution that became LeMoyne College. The namesake of Owen College, established in 1947 as S.A. Owen Junior College, was a distinguished religious and civic leader. The two historically black institutions merged in 1968.
Leopold-Franzens University, Innsbruck, Austria	Emperor Leopold I, Emperor Francis I	Founded by Emperor Leopold I in 1669, re-established by Emperor Francis I in 1826.
LeTourneau University, Texas, US	R.G. LeTourneau	Founder, with his wife Evelyn, of LeTourneau Technical Institute, formed in 1946 to educate veterans returning from World War II
Lipscomb University, Tennessee, US	David Lipscomb	Restoration Movement minister who, together with James A. Harding, founded the institution in 1891
LMU Munich (Ludwig-Maximilians-Universität München), Germany	Louis IX, Duke of Bavaria and Maximilian I Joseph of Bavaria	
Magee College of University of Ulster, Northern Ireland	Martha Magee	Widow of a Presbyterian minister, who, in 1845, bequeathed £20,000 to the Presbyterian Church in Ireland to found a college for theology and the arts
Maharaja Sayajirao University of Baroda, Gujarat, India	Maharaja Sayajirao Gaekwad III	Founder
Maharishi Mahesh Yogi Vedic University, Madhya Pradesh, India	Maharishi Mahesh Yogi	
Maharishi Open University	Maharishi Mahesh Yogi	
Maharishi University of Management, Iowa, US	Maharishi Mahesh Yogi	
McGill University Montreal, Quebec, Canada	James McGill	The university was established in 1821 following a bequest of money and land from the wealthy Montreal merchant and war hero James McGill.
McMaster University, Hamilton, Ontario, Canada	William McMaster	Bequeathed C$900,000 to the founding of the university.
Millikin University, Illinois, US	James Millikin	Local businessman who founded the school in 1901
Mills College at Northeastern University, California, US	Susan Tolman Mills and Cyrus Mills	Originally established as the Young Ladies Seminary; Susan and Cyrus Mills bought it in 1866, renamed it Mills Seminary, and later converted it to Mills College. Susan Mills served as principal and president until 1909.
Millsaps College, Mississippi, US	Reuben Webster Millsaps	A Confederate veteran, Major Millsaps founded the college in 1889–90 by donating $50,000 and land for the campus.
M.V. Lomonosov Moscow State University, Russia	Mikhail Lomonosov	University was established on the instigation of Ivan Shuvalov and Mikhail Lomonosov by a decree of Russian Empress Elizabeth in 1755.
Moody Bible Institute, Chicago, US	Dwight Lyman Moody	
National Sun Yat-sen University, Republic of China (Taiwan)	Sun Yat-sen	Successor to Sun Yat-sen University in Guangzhou, re-established in Taiwan by the ROC government
National University of Kyiv-Mohyla Academy, Kyiv, Ukraine	Petro Mohyla	Institution traces its history to the 1632 merger of two other schools by Mohyla, Metropolitan bishop of Kiev and Galicia.
Nizam's Institute of Medical Sciences, Hyderabad, Andhra Pradesh, India	Fath Jang Nawwab Mir Osman Ali Khan Asif Jah VII	Last Nizam (ruler) of the Princely State of Hyderabad, whose charitable trust founded the institute in the 1960s
Oral Roberts University, Oklahoma, US	Oral Roberts	Televangelist preacher who founded the university in 1963
Osmania University, Andhra Pradesh, India	Osman Ali Khan, Asif Jah VII	Founded the university in 1918
Otis College of Art and Design, California, US	Harrison Gray Otis	Founded in 1918 on land bequeathed for the purpose by Otis, founder of the Los Angeles Times newspaper
Pace University, New York, US	Homer Pace and Charles Ashford Pace	Brothers who founded the school in 1906
Patten University, California, US	Dr. Bebe Patten	Christian evangelist; founded the school in 1944 as the Oakland Bible Institute
Pepperdine University, California, US	George Pepperdine	Businessman who had built a fortune founding and developing the Western Auto Supply Company; he established the college in 1937
Philipps University of Marburg, Germany	Philipp I of Hesse	founded the university in 1527
Pitzer College, California, US	Russell K. Pitzer	California citrus grower who founded the college in 1963
Purdue University, Indiana, US	John Purdue	Businessman Purdue donated funds to the state of Indiana to establish a college of science, technology, and agriculture in his name.
Rensselaer Polytechnic Institute, New York, US	Stephen Van Rensselaer III	Co-founder, with Amos Eaton
Rhodes University, Grahamstown, South Africa	Cecil John Rhodes	English-born Prime Minister of Cape Colony, mining magnate and founder of Rhodesia
Rice University, Texas, US	William Marsh Rice	Businessman whose designated that his estate be used to establish the institution
The Robert Gordon University, Aberdeen, Scotland	Robert Gordon	Merchant Gordon, who died in 1731, willed his estate to build a residential school for young boys in Aberdeen. That school was the genesis of the institution now called the Robert Gordon University.
Roberts Wesleyan University, New York, US	Benjamin Titus Roberts and John Wesley	Named in honor of both the college founder (Roberts) and the founder of Methodism and the Wesleyan Church (Wesley).
Rockefeller University, New York, US	John D. Rockefeller	Founded in 1901 by the oil baron and philanthropist as the Rockefeller Institute for Medical Research
Royal Holloway, University of London, England	Thomas Holloway	Founded Royal Holloway College as a women-only college in 1879
Ruprecht Karl University of Heidelberg, Germany	Rupert I, Elector Palatine and Charles Frederick, Grand Duke of Baden	Founded by Ruprecht in 1386 and re-established by Karl in 1803
Sampurnanand Sanskrit University, Uttar Pradesh, India	Dr. Sampurnanand	Chief Minister of Uttar Pradesh and cofounder in 1958 of the university that was renamed for him in 1974
Sarah Lawrence College, New York, US	Sarah Lawrence, wife of William Van Duzer Lawrence	The college was founded by New York real-estate mogul William Lawrence and named in honor of his wife.
Schreiner University, Texas, US	Capt. Charles Schreiner	The former Texas Ranger founded the school as Schreiner Institute, a combined secondary school and junior college, in 1923. Originally a military institute, it dropped military training in 1971 and ended high school instruction in 1973. It became a four-year institution in 1981.
Scripps College, California, US	Ellen Browning Scripps	
Shahjalal University of Science & Technology, Sylhet, Bangladesh	Hozrot Shahjalal	
Shimer College, Illinois, US	Frances Wood Shimer	Founded the school in 1853 as a non-denominational co-educational seminary
Silpakorn University, Thailand	Silpa Bhirasri	Italian-born art professor who founded the university in 1943; he took the Thai name Silpa Bhirasri when he became a Thai citizen
Skidmore College, New York, US	Lucy Skidmore Scribner and her father, Joseph Russell Skidmore	Lucy Skidmore Scribner formed the Young Women's Industrial Club in 1903 with inheritance money from her father, a prosperous coal merchant. In 1911, the club was chartered under the name "Skidmore School of Arts" as a college for vocational and professional training of young women.
Smith College, Massachusetts, US	Sophia Smith	Willed her inherited fortune to endow the founding of the college
Sri Sathya Sai Institute of Higher Learning, Andhra Pradesh, India	Sathya Sai Baba	Founded the institution in 1981
Stanford University, California, US	Leland Stanford, Jr.	Founded by railroad magnate and California Governor Leland Stanford and his wife, Jane Stanford, and named in honor of their only child, who died of typhoid just before his 16th birthday.
Sun Yat-sen University, Guangzhou, China	Dr. Sun Yat-sen	Physician, president of the Republic of China, and Kuomintang leader who founded the university in 1924
Surendranath College, Kolkata, India	Surendranath Banerjea	Previously called Ripon College, named for the British Viceroy Lord Ripon; renamed in 1948-1949 for its founder, Indian nationalist leader Banerjea.
Swinburne University of Technology, Melbourne, Australia	George Swinburne	Australian engineer, politician and philanthropist. Named Swinburne Technical College after its founder in 1913. Proclaimed as a university in 1992.
Thapar University, Punjab, India	Family of Karam Chand Thapar	Industrialist K.C. Thapar founded the school as the Thapar Institute of Engineering and Technology in 1956
Tribhuvan University, Kathmandu, Nepal	Shah King of Nepal	Tribhuvan University was named after Late King Tribhuvan
Universidade Cândido Mendes, Rio de Janeiro, Brazil	Count Cândido Mendes de Almeida	Brazilian educator and first dean (1902)
Universidade Gama Filho, Rio de Janeiro, Brazil	Luís da Gama Filho	Brazilian lawyer and educator
Van Mildert College (Durham University), England	William Van Mildert	Prince-Bishop of Durham from 1826 to 1836 and a leading figure in the founding of Durham University in 1832
Vassar College, New York, US	Matthew Vassar	Brewer and merchant who founded the college in 1861
Universidade Veiga de Almeida, Rio de Janeiro, Brazil	Mário Veiga de Almeida	Brazilian educator
Wells College, New York, US	Henry Wells	Founder of Wells Fargo and American Express who established the school as a woman's college in 1868
Wheaton College (Massachusetts), US	Eliza Wheaton Strong	Wheaton Female Seminary was established in her memory by her family in 1835.
Wheelock College (Massachusetts), US	Lucy Wheelock	Founded the college in 1888
Whitworth University, Washington, US	George F. Whitworth	Founded institution in 1883 as Sumner Academy; renamed in his honor in 1890

=== Benefactors or their family members ===
Institution	Namesake	Notes
Agnes Scott College, Georgia, US	Agnes Scott	George Washington Scott, Confederate general and businessman, gave $112,250 to Decatur Female Seminary (which he helped organize), which then renamed itself in honor of his mother.
Albertson College of Idaho, US	Joe Albertson	Grocery retailer and major donor to the College of Idaho, which changed its name in his honor in 1991, but reverted to its original name in 2007.
Ball State University, Indiana, US	The Ball Brothers	Founders of the Ball Corporation who bought the Indiana Normal Institute out of foreclosure and donated it to the state of Indiana.
Baruch College, New York, US	Bernard M. Baruch	The School of Business and Civic Administration of the City College of New York was renamed in 1953 for Baruch, a wealthy financier and devoted alumnus. The school received $9 million from his estate upon his death in 1965.
Bates College, Maine, US	Benjamin E. Bates	Boston financier; provided financial support for school's expansion in 1863.
Benedict College, South Carolina, US	Mrs. Bathsheba A. Benedict	Under the auspices of the American Baptist Home Mission Society, Mrs. Bathsheba A. Benedict of Pawtucket, Rhode Island, provided $13,000.00 to purchase the land for Benedict Institute.
Bennett College, North Carolina, US	Lyman Bennett	Donations from Bennett, a New York businessman, provided funds to build a permanent campus.
Bexley Hall (seminary), Ohio and New York, US	Nicholas Vansittart, 1st Baron Bexley	Benefactor of Kenyon College in Ohio, where Bexley Hall was founded
Bocconi University, Milan, Italy	Luigi Bocconi	University was founded with the help of an endowment from wealthy merchant Ferdinando Bocconi and was named for Bocconi's son, who had died in the First Italo–Ethiopian War.
Bowdoin College, Maine, US	James Bowdoin	Former Massachusetts governor whose son James Bowdoin III was an early benefactor of the school, which was chartered in 1794.
Brown University, Rhode Island, US	Family of John Brown and Nicholas Brown, Jr.	Local businessmen, the Browns were among the signers of the College of Rhode Island's original charter in 1764 and became major benefactors; it was renamed in their honor in 1804.
Bucknell University, Pennsylvania, US	William Bucknell	Originally the University at Lewisburg; renamed in 1886 in honor of the benefactor from Philadelphia who assisted the school during the post-Civil War recession.
Carleton College, Minnesota, US	William Carleton	Originally Northfield College; renamed five years after its establishment (in 1871) to honor benefactor William Carleton, who had given US$50,000 to the fledgling institution.
Chapman University, California, US	Charles C. Chapman	Originally called Hesperian College and later California Christian College; renamed in 1934 in honor of Chapman, the chairman of the institution's board of trustees and a principal benefactor.
Claflin University, South Carolina, US	William Claflin and Lee Claflin	Massachusetts Governor William Claflin and his father, Boston philanthropist Lee Claflin, provided a large part of the funds to purchase the campus for the HBCU college.
Clare College, Cambridge, UK	Elizabeth de Clare	Founded in 1326 as University Hall but suffered financial hardship; was refounded in 1338 as Clare Hall by an endowment from Elizabeth de Clare, a granddaughter of Edward I.
Clemson University, South Carolina, US	Thomas Green Clemson (1807–1888)	Clemson's will directed that most of his estate be used to establish a college to teach scientific agriculture and the mechanical arts to South Carolinians.
Coe College, Iowa, US	Daniel Coe	Farmer in the Catskills region of New York who pledged $1,500 toward the 1853 founding of the Cedar Rapids Collegiate Institute (later renamed in his honor). His pledge was made with the stipulation that the school be coeducational.
Colby College, Maine, US	Gardner Colby	Originally (in 1813) the Maine Literary and Theological Institution and later Waterville College, was renamed for Boston merchant Colby due to his financial support which helped the school survive during the American Civil War.
Colgate University, New York, US	William Colgate and family	Originally the Baptist Education Society of the State of New York and later Madison University, was renamed for Colgate (founder of the company that became Colgate-Palmolive) in 1890 in honor of nearly 70 years of involvement and service by the Colgate family.
Converse University, South Carolina, US	Dexter Edgar Converse	Cotton mill owner who was among the school's founders and made substantial contributions
Dartmouth College, New Hampshire, US	William Legge, 2nd Earl of Dartmouth	Large donor to and a leading trustee for the English trust established for the benefit of the college
Denison University, Ohio, US	William S. Denison	Local Ohio farmer who donated to the university (then Granville Theological Seminary)
DePauw University, Indiana, US	Washington Charles DePauw	Originally called Indiana Asbury University, renamed in 1884 in honor of DePauw's substantial donations, which totaled over $600,000 during his lifetime.
Dickinson College, Pennsylvania, US	John Dickinson	Signer of both the Articles of Confederation and the Constitution of the United States who was President of Pennsylvania at the time of the college's founding and who donated 500 acres (2.0 km^{2}) of land for the campus
Drake University, Iowa, US	Francis Marion Drake	Endowed the institution in 1881; later became governor of Iowa
Drew University, New Jersey, US	Daniel Drew	Financier who endowed the school (originally Drew Theological Seminary) at its founding in 1867
Duke University, North Carolina, US	Washington Duke	Name changed from Trinity College to Duke University in 1924, after tobacco industrialist James B. Duke established The Duke Endowment. The name honors the donor's deceased father.
Eckerd College, Florida, US	Jack Eckerd	Founder of Eckerd Drugs; donated $12.5 million to Florida Presbyterian College, which was renamed in his honor in 1972
Eugene Lang College, New York, US	Eugene Lang	Originally The New School for Liberal Arts; renamed in 1985 following a generous donation by philanthropist and educational visionary Lang and his wife Theresa
Fairleigh Dickinson University, New Jersey, US	Col. Fairleigh S. Dickinson, Sr.	co-founder of Becton Dickinson
Far Eastern University – Nicanor Reyes Medical Foundation, Quezon City, Philippines	Nicanor Reyes Sr.	founder of the Far Eastern University
Franklin W. Olin College of Engineering, Massachusetts, US	Franklin W. Olin	Founder of the Olin Corporation; College's endowment is funded primarily by his F. W. Olin Foundation
Grinnell College, Iowa, US	Josiah Bushnell Grinnell	Congregationalist minister and later politician who funded the move of the former Iowa College to its current site in the town of Grinnell.
Hamline University, Minnesota, US	Leonidas Lent Hamline	Methodist Bishop who provided US$25,000 of his own money to launch the school, founded in 1854.
Harvard University, Massachusetts, US	John Harvard	Young clergyman whose bequest of £779, was (in 1639) the first principal donation to the new institution, his gift assured its continued operation.
Hofstra University, New York, US	William Hofstra	University was established on the grounds of the Hofstra estate with funds that his widow's will designated for creating a memorial to her husband.
Hollins University, Virginia, US	John Hollins and Ann Halsey Hollins	early benefactors
Howard Payne University, Texas, US	Edward Howard Payne	A large gift from Payne (brother-in-law of one of the founders) helped to establish the institution
Johns Hopkins University, Maryland, US	Johns Hopkins	Hopkins, who died in 1873, bequeathed $7 million for the founding of the university and Johns Hopkins Hospital. At the time, this was the largest philanthropic bequest in U.S. history, the equivalent of over $131 million in 2006.
Juilliard School, New York, US	Augustus Juilliard	Named for Juilliard, a textile merchant, who bequeathed a substantial amount for the advancement of music in the United States
Kenyon College, Ohio, US	George Kenyon, 2nd Baron Kenyon	Lord Kenyon was one of the college's earliest benefactors in 1824. Another was Lord Gambier, whose name was given to the associated village, Gambier, Ohio.
Kettering University, Michigan, US	Charles Kettering	Inventor, proponent of cooperative education, and an early benefactor of the school under one of its previous names.
King University, Tennessee, US	James King	College was originally located on land donated by Reverend King.
King Edward Medical University (Kemc), Lahore, Pakistan	Edward VII of the United Kingdom	Founded as Lahore Medical College, renamed King Edward Medical College after receiving assistance from the King Edward Medical Memorial Fund
Kotelawala Defence University, Colombo, Sri Lanka	General Sir John Kotelawala	Established on an estate donated by Kotelawala, a former Prime Minister of Ceylon
Université Laval [in English: Laval University], Quebec, Canada	Bishop François de Laval	First Bishop of New France
Lawrence University, Wisconsin, US	Amos Adams Lawrence	Philanthropist Lawrence contributed $10,000 toward the school's founding
Lewis University, Illinois, US	Frank J. Lewis	philanthropist who funded the construction of many of the school's buildings
Macalester College, Minnesota, US	Charles Macalester	Philadelphia, PA, businessman who sponsored the institution's conversion from a school to a college.
University of Mary Hardin–Baylor, Texas, US	Mary Hardin	One half of a married couple whose gift to what was then Baylor College for Women saved the school from closure during the Great Depression.
Meharry Medical College, Tennessee, US	Samuel Meharry	Meharry was a young white man who, in 1826, was aided after an accident by a family of freed slaves. Afterward, he promised to repay their help by doing "something for your race." Fifty years later, he and four brothers donated $15,000 to assist with establishment of the medical department at Central Tennessee College; that department later became Meharry Medical College.
Oxford Brookes University, Oxford, England	John Brookes	Brookes was the founding principal.
Paul Smith's College, New York, US	Apollos (Paul) Smith	Smith amassed a fortune in real estate and other businesses after starting out as a hunting guide in the Adirondacks. His son left a bequest to start a college in his name.
Philander Smith College, Arkansas, US	Philander Smith	Renamed from Walden Seminary in 1882 to recognize the financial contributions of Adeline Smith, the widow of Philander Smith.
Radcliffe College, Massachusetts, US	Ann Mowlson	Lady Ann Mowlson, née Radcliffe, established the first scholarship at Harvard University (Radcliffe's parent institution) in 1643. The college was fully incorporated into Harvard in 1999, with the campus now serving as home to the Radcliffe Institute for Advanced Study.
Reed College, Oregon, US	Simeon Gannett Reed and Amanda Reed	Oregon pioneers; Amanda Reed's estate provided the endowment with which the college was founded.
Rhodes University, Eastern Cape Province, South Africa	Cecil Rhodes	The establishment of the university was aided by the Rhodes Trust.
Robert Wood Johnson Medical School, New Jersey, US	Robert Wood Johnson III	Originally Rutgers Medical School, received its current name in 1986.
Robinson College, Cambridge, England	David Robinson	British philanthropist who gave Cambridge University £17 million to establish a new college.
Rowan University, New Jersey, US	Henry Rowan and Betty Rowan	Formerly Glassboro State College; was renamed in 1992 after the Rowans gave $100 million to the school, at the time the largest gift to a public college.
Russell Sage College, New York, US	Russell Sage	
Rutgers University, New Jersey, US	Henry Rutgers	American Revolutionary War hero whose donations helped the college (originally called Queen's College) survive difficult financial times.
Shreemati Nathibai Damodar Thackersey Women's University, India	Nathibai Damodar Thackersey	Mother of Sir Vithaldas Thackersey, who made a generous contribution in her memory.
Spelman College, Georgia, US	Laura Spelman Rockefeller	Wife of donor John D. Rockefeller
Stetson University, Florida, US	John Batterson Stetson	Creator of the Stetson hat; donated generously to DeLand University, which changed its name to John B. Stetson University in 1889.
Stevens Institute of Technology, New Jersey, US	Edwin A. Stevens	His bequest helped to establish the institution
Tata Institute of Fundamental Research, Mumbai, India	J.R.D. Tata	
Tata Institute of Social Sciences, Mumbai, India	Sir Dorabji Tata	Established with support from the Sir Dorabji Tata Trust; trust founder Sir Dorabji Tata was influential in establishing the Tata family's industrial endeavors.
Thiel College, Pennsylvania, US	A. Louis Thiel	Provided initial funding for the school in 1866, donating $4,000 that he had received from an investment in the new oil industry in Titusville, Pennsylvania
Tufts University, Massachusetts, US	Charles Tufts	Donated the land for the campus
Tulane University, Louisiana, US	Paul Tulane	Tulane was converted from a public to a private university in the late 19th century with financing from the endowments of Paul Tulane and Josephine Louise Newcomb.
Vanderbilt University, Tennessee, US	Cornelius Vanderbilt	Provided the institution its initial $1 million endowment.
Voorhees University, South Carolina, US	Ralph Voorhees	The HBCU school was originally named Denmark Industrial School after its location in Denmark, South Carolina. After donations from Ralph Voorhees, a New Jersey philanthropist, it was renamed the Vorhees Industrial Institute for Colored Youths. It later was named Vorhees School and Junior College. In 1962, it was renamed Voorhees College.
Washington College, Maryland, US	George Washington	Founded in 1782 by William Smith with the patronage of George Washington, who consented to give his name to the college and who served five years on the Board of Visitors and Governors, before beginning his presidency of the United States
Washington and Lee University, Virginia, US	George Washington (and Robert E. Lee)	In 1796, while he was still President of the United States, Washington endowed what was then known as Liberty Hall Academy with $20,000, at the time the largest gift ever to a U.S. institution of higher learning. The school then became Washington Academy and later Washington College.
Wheaton College (Illinois), US	Warren L. Wheaton	Early donor who also was a founder of the city of Wheaton, Illinois
Williams College, Massachusetts, US	Ephraim Williams	Benefactor whose estate helped to found the college in 1793
Wilson College (Pennsylvania), US	Sarah Wilson	First major donor to the college
Winthrop University, South Carolina, US	Robert C. Winthrop	Donor whose contribution was enough to rent the institution's first one-room building.
Wofford College, South Carolina, US	Benjamin Wofford	Methodist minister whose $100,000 bequest founded the college in 1854.
Yale University, Connecticut, US	Elihu Yale	English merchant, philanthropist and benefactor of the college in 1718, donating gifts worth £800, used to construct building called Yale college.
Young Harris College, Georgia, US	Young Harris	benefactor
Federico Santa María Technical University, Valparaíso, Chile	Federico Santa María	Chilean businessman and philanthropist. Because he had no descendants, he gave his entire fortune to his hometown Valparaíso for the founding of a technical and engineering school. The result of his legacy was the Federico Santa María Technical University.

=== Other institutional associations ===
Institution	Namesake	Notes
Barnard College, New York, US	Frederick A.P. Barnard	President of Columbia College in the years prior to Barnard's founding as Columbia's sister school; was a proponent of higher education for women.
Bates Technical College, Tacoma, US	LaVerne H. Bates	Early director of the college
Cardinal Stritch University, Wisconsin, US	Samuel Stritch	Originally St. Clare College; renamed in 1946 when Stritch, who had been Archbishop of Milwaukee when the school was established within that archdiocese, became a Roman Catholic cardinal.
Cheikh Anta Diop University, Senegal	Cheikh Anta Diop	Senegalese historian and anthropologist who worked at the University of Dakar, which was renamed for him after his death.
Claremont McKenna College, California, US	Donald McKenna	Originally named Claremont Men's College for its location; the name of McKenna, one of the school's founding trustees, was added to the name when the school became coeducational in 1976
Collingwood College (Durham University), England	Edward Collingwood	Mathematician who served as Chair of Council at Durham University
Crichton College, Tennessee, US	Dr. James B. Crichton	Established in 1941 and formerly called Mid-South Bible College, renamed in honor of this former school president and professor in 1986
C. W. Post College, New York, US	Charles William Post	Breakfast cereal inventor and father of Marjorie Merriweather Post, who sold the school's campus to Long Island University.
Dawson College, Montréal, Quebec Canada	John William Dawson Sir William Dawson	Professor of geology and principal of McGill University (Dawson's parent institution) from 1855 to 1893
Eötvös Loránd University, Budapest, Hungary	Loránd Eötvös	Physicist who researched and taught in the university (then called University of Budapest), which was renamed in his honor in 1950
Faulkner University, Alabama, US	James H. Faulkner	Longtime supporter and chairman of the board of trustees.
Furman University, South Carolina, US	Richard Furman	A founder of the South Carolina Baptist Convention whose efforts in support of Baptist missions and education led to the establishment of Furman University (and other institutions) and whose organizational concepts were eventually adopted by the Southern Baptist Convention. His son was the school's first president.
Hamilton College, New York, US	Alexander Hamilton	Hamilton, one of the Founding Fathers of the United States, was one of the institution's first trustees.
Henderson State University, Arkansas, US	Charles Christopher Henderson	Early trustee of the college originally called Arkadelphia Methodist College.
Hendrix College, Arkansas, US	Eugene Russell Hendrix	Bishop of the Methodist Episcopal Church, which had recently purchased the school previously named Central Collegiate Institute.
Kean University, New Jersey, US	Robert Winthrop Kean	Member of the U.S. House of Representatives and father of former New Jersey governor Thomas Kean. Campus site once belonged to the Kean family, including land purchased while Robert Kean was in Congress.
Libera Università Internazionale degli Studi Sociali Guido Carli, Rome, Italy	Guido Carli	President of the university from 1978 until his death in 1993.
Nicolae Testemițanu State University of Medicine and Pharmacy, Chișinău, Moldova	Nicolae Testemițanu	Rector of the university from 1959 to 1963.
Obafemi Awolowo University, Ile-Ife, Osun State, Nigeria	Obafemi Awolowo	First Nigerian premier of the Western Region of Nigeria who was also the university's founding statesman and first Chancellor.
Rhodes College, Tennessee, US	Peyton Nalle Rhodes	Former president of the college which had previously held names including Montgomery Masonic College, Stewart College, Southwestern Presbyterian University, and Southwestern at Memphis.
Semmelweis University, Budapest, Hungary	Ignác Semmelweis	The medical school, first established in 1769, was renamed in 1969 in honor of 19th century Hungarian physician Semmelweis, discoverer of the cause of puerperal fever, who was a professor and chairman in the institution's Faculty of Medicine
Seton Hall University, New Jersey, US	Elizabeth Ann Seton	Mother Seton was the first American-born Catholic saint. The university was founded in 1856 by her nephew, Archdiocese of Newark Bishop James Roosevelt Bayley, who named the institution for his aunt.
Sharif University, Tehran, Iran	Majid Sharif Vaghefi	Islamic martyr (1949–1975) and graduate of Aryamehr University, which was renamed as a memorial after Iran's Islamic revolution.
Sir George Williams University (merged with Loyola College to form the present Concordia University) Montreal, Quebec, Canada	Sir George Williams (YMCA)	British founder of the worldwide YMCA movement. Sir George Williams University originated as a night school adjunct to the Montreal YMCA, the first YMCA in North America. The downtown branch of Concordia University is still known as the Sir George Williams Campus.
Spalding University, Kentucky, US	Catherine Spalding	Mother Spalding was the first superior of the Sisters of Charity of Nazareth, an order of Catholic nuns which founded the school that evolved into today's university.
Trevelyan College (Durham University), England	G. M. Trevelyan	Historian who served as Chancellor of Durham University from 1950 to 1957
Ustinov College (Durham University), England	Peter Ustinov	Chancellor of Durham University from 1992 to 2004
Warren Wilson College, North Carolina, US	Warren Hugh Wilson	Presbyterian minister who served on the Board of Home Missions of the Presbyterian Church (US), which named the college in his honor after his death.
Washington and Lee University, Virginia, US	(George Washington and) Robert E. Lee	Immediately after the Civil War, Lee accepted an offer to be president of what was then Washington College, and served until his death in 1870, at which time Lee's name was added to the school.

== Institutions named for contemporary royalty or politicians ==
Some educational institutions carry the names of members of royalty or political leaders who were in power at the time the institutions were established or received their present names. Some of these schools were given the names of the leaders who officially chartered them (for example, Charles University of Prague in the Czech Republic and College of William and Mary in the United States). Other institutions may have received other forms of support from their namesakes.

The following list includes both institutions named for members of royalty or politicians in power at the time the institutions received those names and institutions that were named for recently deceased royalty or politicians who may have been special supporters of the schools. Institutions named for family members of such leaders also are listed.

Institution	Namesake	Notes
Ahmadu Bello University, Nigeria	Ahmadu Bello	Sardauna of Sokoto, Sir Ahmadu Bello, was the first premier of Northern Nigeria.
Cégep André-Laurendeau LaSalle, Quebec Canada.	André Laurendeau	Novelist, playwright, essay writer, journalist and politician in Quebec, Canada.
Austin Peay State University, Clarksville, Tennessee, United States	Austin Peay	Governor of Tennessee; died in office (in 1927) two years before school opened
Ben-Gurion University of the Negev, Beersheba Israel	David Ben-Gurion	School was originally University of the Negev, but was renamed after the death of Ben-Gurion, Israel's first Prime Minister, in 1973
Charles University of Prague, Czech Republic	Charles IV, Holy Roman Emperor	Holy Roman Emperor who authorized the establishment of the university.
Dhirubhai Ambani Institute of Information and Communication Technology, Gandhinagar, Gujarat, India	Dhirubhai Ambani	Indian entrepreneur who founded Reliance Industries.
George Brown College, Toronto, Ontario, Canada	George Brown	19th century politician and newspaper publisher and one of the Fathers of Confederation.
Collège Gérald-Godin, Sainte-Geneviève, Quebec, Canada	Gérald Godin	Quebec poet, journalist and politician.
Grey College, Durham, England	Charles Grey, 2nd Earl Grey	British Prime Minister at the time that Durham University was founded
Imam Khomeini International University, Qazvin, Iran	Ruhollah Khomeini	Supreme Leader of Iran
MacEwan University, Edmonton, Canada	Dr. J.W. Grant MacEwan,	Author, educator, and former lieutenant governor of Alberta
Dr. NTR University of Health Sciences, Andhra Pradesh	N.T. Rama Rao	Famous actor in Telugu film industry and Chief Minister of Andhra Pradesh when institution was founded in 1986
Dr. Yashwant Singh Parmar University of Horticulture and Forestry, Himachal Pradesh, India	Yashwant Singh Parmar	Established in 1962 as the Himachal Agricultural College and Research Institute; was named in 1985 for Parmar, popularly called "architect of Himachal Pradesh," who had been the first Chief Minister of the state and was an advocate for the Horticulture and Forestry University
Kim Il Sung University, Pyongyang North Korea	Kim Il Sung	Founder of Communist North Korea
King Fahd University of Petroleum and Minerals, Dhahran, Saudi Arabia	King Fahd	First the College of Petroleum and Minerals and later the University of Petroleum and Minerals, was renamed in 1986 in honor of King Fahd, who ruled Saudi Arabia from 1982 to 2005.
King Faisal University, Dammam Saudi Arabia	King Faisal	Established in 1975, the same year that King Faisal was assassinated
Mohammed V University, Rabat, Morocco	Mohammed V of Morocco	Sultan of Morocco who became King in 1957, the year the university was established
Moshood Abiola University, Lagos, Nigeria	Moshood Kashimawo Olawale Abiola	Foremost Nigerian philanthropist and politician, famous for the aborted June 12, 1993 Presidential held in Nigeria
Nnamdi Azikiwe University, Awka, Nigeria	Nnamdi Azikiwe	The only indigenous Governor-General of the Post Independence Nigeria.
University of Naples Federico II, Italy	Frederick II, Holy Roman Emperor	Holy Roman Emperor who authorized the establishment of the university
Ural Federal University, Yekaterinburg, Russia	Boris Yeltsin	The first President of the Russian Federation (1991–1999), graduate of the university
Obafemi Awolowo University, Ile-Ife, Nigeria	Obafemi Awolowo	First premier of the old Western Region; politician, lawyer and elder statesman
President Ramon Magsaysay State University, Iba, Zambales, Philippines	Ramon Magsaysay	Seventh President of the Republic of the Philippines
Prince Sultan University, Riyadh, Saudi Arabia	Prince Sultan	Member of the House of Saud; Crown Prince of Saudi Arabia from 2005 until his death in 2011
Queen Maud University College, Norway	Queen Maud of Norway	In 1954 King Haakon VII gifted his late wife's memorial fund to the school.
Queen's University at Kingston, Ontario, Canada	Queen Victoria	The university received a royal charter (as Queen's College) from Queen Victoria in 1841.
Queen's University Belfast, Northern Ireland	Queen Victoria	The university received a royal charter from Queen Victoria in 1845.
Rajendra Institute of Medical Sciences (RIMS), Ranchi, Jharkhand State, India	Dr. Rajendra Prasad	First president of India
Sanjay Gandhi Postgraduate Institute of Medical Sciences, Uttar Pradesh, India	Sanjay Gandhi	Deceased son of Indira Gandhi, who was India's prime minister when the institute was established in 1983.
Victoria University, Toronto, Ontario, Canada	Queen Victoria	Founded in 1831 as Upper Canada Academy. Renamed Victoria College in 1841. Renamed Victoria University in 1884.
Victoria University of Manchester, Manchester, England	Queen Victoria	Founded in 1851 as Owens College. Received a royal charter from Queen Victoria in 1880 and renamed Victoria University of Manchester. Absorbed into the University of Manchester in 2004.
Victoria University of Wellington, Wellington, New Zealand	Queen Victoria	Named in 1897 on the 60th anniversary of Queen Victoria's coronation.
The College of William & Mary, Williamsburg, Virginia, United States	King William III and Queen Mary II of England	College was founded in 1693 by a Royal Charter issued by King William and Queen Mary
Zayed University, Dubai and Abu Dhabi, United Arab Emirates	Sheikh Zayed bin Sultan Al Nahyan	First president of United Arab Emirates

== Institutions named in honor of historical people not connected with the institution ==
=== Religious figures ===
The following universities and colleges are named for people who are noted primarily for their contributions to religion, including theologians, saints, holy people, and founders of religious denominations. Most, but not all, of the institutions of higher education named for religious figures are religious institutions.

Institution	Namesake	Notes
St. Anthony's College, Lahore, Pakistan	St. Anthony	Anthony of Padua was a Portuguese Catholic saint. He is known to have become the "quickest" saint in the history of the Catholic Church because he was canonized by Pope Gregory IX less than one year after his death on the 30th of May 1232.
Acharya Nagarjuna University, Andhra Pradesh, India	Nagarjuna	Founder of the Madhyamaka path of Mahayana Buddhism
Albertus Magnus College, Connecticut, US	Albertus Magnus	Medieval Roman Catholic philosopher and theologian
Albright College, Pennsylvania, US	Jacob Albright	Preacher who founded the Evangelical Association (later the Evangelical United Brethren Church)
Allen University, South Carolina, US	Bishop Richard Allen	Founder of the African Methodist Episcopal Church
Aquinas College	St. Thomas Aquinas	Medieval Roman Catholic theologian; the name "Aquinas College" is used by several institutions of higher education around the world
Asbury Theological Seminary, Kentucky, US	Francis Asbury	First American bishop of the Methodist Episcopal Church, a predecessor to the United Methodist Church
Asbury University, Kentucky, US	Francis Asbury	First American bishop of the Methodist Episcopal Church, a predecessor to the United Methodist Church
Baba Farid University of Health Sciences, Punjab, India	Baba Fariduddin Ganjshakar	12th century Sufi preacher, saint of Punjab, and poet of Punjabi language
Bar-Ilan University, Ramat Gan, Israel	Meir Bar-Ilan	Leader of Religious Zionism
Barton College, North Carolina, US	Barton W. Stone	Founder of the Christian Church (Disciples of Christ); Atlantic Christian College was renamed in his honor in 1990.
Bellarmine University, Kentucky, US	Robert Bellarmine	Catholic saint
Calvin University, Michigan, US	John Calvin	Theologian of the Protestant Reformation
Canisius College, New York, US	Petrus Canisius	Catholic Saint
DePaul University, Illinois, US	St. Vincent de Paul	Catholic Saint
George Fox University, Oregon, US	George Fox	Founder of the Quaker movement
Gonzaga University, Washington, US	Aloysius Gonzaga	Catholic saint; patron saint of youth
Guru Ghasidas University, Chhattisgarh, India	Guru Ghasidas	Hindu saint; founder of the Satnami sect of Hinduism
Guru Jambheshwar University of Science & Technology, Haryana State, India	Guru Jambheshwar	Hindu saint of the 15th century, founder and guru of the Bishnoi sect
Guru Gobind Singh Indraprastha University, Delhi, India	Guru Gobind Singh	Sikh warrior, poet, and spiritual leader
Guru Nanak Dev University, Amritsar, Punjab, India	Guru Nanak Dev	Founder of Sikhism
Hatfield College (Durham University), England	Thomas Hatfield	Bishop of Durham from 1345 to 1381, considered the founder of Durham College, Oxford
John Carroll University, Ohio, US	John Carroll	Originally St. Ignatius College, renamed in 1923 for Carroll, the first archbishop of the Catholic Church in the United States and founder of fellow Jesuit institution Georgetown University
La Salle University, Pennsylvania, US	Jean-Baptiste de la Salle	Catholic saint whose work contributed to improving education
Le Moyne College, New York, US	Simon Le Moyne	Catholic missionary of the Society of Jesus
Collège Lionel-Groulx, Quebec Canada	Canon Lionel Groulx	Catholic priest, Quebec historian, editor
Loyola Marymount University, California, US	Saint Ignatius of Loyola	Founder of the Roman Catholic Society of Jesus (Jesuits)
Loyola University Chicago, Illinois, US	Saint Ignatius of Loyola	Founder of the Roman Catholic Society of Jesus (Jesuits)
Loyola University Maryland, US	Saint Ignatius of Loyola	Founder of the Roman Catholic Society of Jesus (Jesuits)
Loyola University New Orleans, Louisiana, US	Saint Ignatius of Loyola	Founder of the Roman Catholic Society of Jesus (Jesuits)
Luther College, Iowa, US	Martin Luther	Leader of the Protestant Reformation who founded Lutheranism
Cégep Marie-Victorin, Quebec, Canada	Brother Marie-Victorin	Christian Brother and botanist, founded the botanical garden in Montréal, Quebec.
Martin Luther University of Halle-Wittenberg, Germany	Martin Luther	Leader of the Protestant Reformation who also was a professor in Wittenberg
Matteo Ricci College, Seattle, US	Matteo Ricci	Italian Jesuit priest and one of the founding figures of the Jesuit China missions.
Momoyama Gakuin University, Osaka, Japan	Saint Andrew	The school's English name is St. Andrew's University, for St. Andrew, one of the Twelve Apostles. (The Japanese name refers to its original location in an area of peach orchards.)
Otterbein University, Ohio, US	Philip William Otterbein	Clergyman who founded the United Brethren in Christ
Radboud University Nijmegen, Netherlands	Saint Radboud	Originally the Catholic University of Nijmegen, renamed in 2004 for the Radboud Foundation (named for Saint Radboud, a medieval Bishop of Utrecht), which had the goal of stimulating Roman Catholic higher education and funded the university.
Universidad de San Andrés, Buenos Aires province, Argentina	Saint Andrew	Founded by Scottish immigrants in 1838 and named for the patron saint of Scotland
St Aidan's College (Durham University), England	Aidan of Lindisfarne	Missionary credited with restoring Christianity to Northumbria in the 7th century.
University of St Andrews, Scotland	Saint Andrew	Patron saint of Scotland
St. Angela's College, Sligo, Ireland (NUI Galway)	Saint Angela Merici	Italian religious educator and founder of the Ursuline Order
Université Sainte-Anne, Collège de l'Acadie, Nova Scotia, Canada	Saint Anne	The mother of the Virgin Mary
St Catherine's College of Education for Home Economics, Dublin, Ireland	Saint Catherine of Siena	Dominican saint (the school was run by the Dominican Order)
Santa Clara University, California, United States	Saint Clare	One of the first followers of Saint Francis of Assisi
St Chad's College (Durham University), England	St. Chad	Bishop of Mercia
St Cuthbert's Society (Durham University), England	St. Cuthbert	Patron Saint of Northumbria
Saint Francis Xavier University, Nova Scotia, Canada	St. Francis Xavier	Co-founder of the Jesuits
College of St Hild and St Bede (Durham University), England	St. Hild and St. Bede	Hild, Abbess of Whitby and Bede, Monk of Wearmouth and Jarrow (and the first English historian)
St John's College (Durham University), England	St John the Evangelist	Author to whom the Fourth Gospel is traditionally attributed
St. John's University, New York, US	St. John the Baptist	Forerunner and baptizer of Jesus
Saint Joseph's University, Pennsylvania, United States	Saint Joseph	Husband of Mary, mother of Jesus
St Mary's College (Durham University), England	The Blessed Virgin Mary	Mother of Jesus
Saint Mary's College, Indiana, US	The Blessed Virgin Mary	Mother of Jesus
Saint Mary's College of California, US	The Blessed Virgin Mary	Mother of Jesus
Mary Immaculate College, Limerick, Ireland	The Blessed Virgin Mary	Mother of Jesus
Saint Michael's College, Vermont, US	Saint Michael the Archangel	
St. Patrick's, Carlow College, Carlow, Ireland	Saint Patrick	Patron saint of Ireland
St Patrick's College, Maynooth, Ireland	Saint Patrick	Patron saint of Ireland
St. Photios Orthodox Theological Seminary, California, US	St. Photios of Constantinople	Spiritual leader who also promoted education
Shri Guru Gobind Singhji Institute of Engineering and Technology, Maharashtra, India	Guru Gobind Singh	Sikh warrior, poet, and spiritual leader
Sree Sankaracharya University of Sanskrit, Kerala, India	Adi Shankara	Philosopher of Hinduism
Sri Chandrasekharendra Saraswathi Viswa Mahavidyalaya, Chennai, India	Chandrashekarendra Saraswati	Hindu saint known as the Sage of Kanchi (1894–1994)
Coláiste Stiofáin Naofa, Cork, Ireland	Saint Stephen	First Christian martyr
Pontifical University of St. Thomas Aquinas (Angelicum), Rome, Italy	St. Thomas Aquinas	Father of the Thomistic school of philosophy and theology
College of Saint Thomas More, Texas, US	Thomas More	Catholic saint
Thomas More University, Kentucky, US	Thomas More	Catholic saint
Thomas More College of Liberal Arts, New Hampshire, US	Thomas More	Catholic saint
Wesleyan University, Connecticut, US	John Wesley	Wesleyan University is the oldest of the numerous institutions for whom Wesley (Protestant theologian who was the founder of Methodism) was namesake (see Wesleyan University (disambiguation))
William Carey University, Mississippi, US	William Carey	One of the founders of the Baptist Missionary Society, considered the "father of modern missions"
Xavier University, Ohio, US	St. Francis Xavier	Co-founder of the Jesuits
Xavier University – Ateneo de Cagayan, Philippines	St. Francis Xavier	Co-founder of the Jesuits
Xavier University of Louisiana, US	St. Francis Xavier	Co-founder of the Jesuits
York St John University, York, England	St. John the Evangelist	Ultimately derived from St John's College, a men's teacher training college founded in 1841.

=== Shia imams ===
Institution	Namesake	Notes
Imam Ali Officers' Academy, Tehran, Iran	Ali ibn Abi Talib	1st Shia Imam, the military academy of Ground Forces of Islamic Republic of Iran Army
Imam Hossein University, Tehran, Iran	Husayn ibn Ali	3rd Shia Imam, affiliated with the Islamic Revolutionary Guard Corps
Sadjad University of Technology, Mashhad, Iran	Ali ibn Husayn Zayn al-Abidin	4th Shia Imam, Private university
Imam Sadiq University, Tehran, Iran	Ja'far al-Sadiq	6th Shia Imam, Private Islamic university
Baqiyatallah University of Medical Sciences, Tehran, Iran	Muhammad al-Mahdi	12th Shia Imam, affiliated with the Islamic Revolutionary Guard Corps

=== Other historical figures ===
Universities and colleges have been named for a diverse variety of historical figures, including national heroes, poets, prominent scientists, and political figures of the past.

Institution	Namesake	Notes
Aalto University, Helsinki, Finland	Alvar Aalto	Finnish architect
Acharya N. G. Ranga Agricultural University, Andhra Pradesh, India	Acharya N.G. Ranga	Indian freedom fighter and Parliamentarian; Andhra Pradesh Agricultural University was renamed for him after his death.
Adam Mickiewicz University in Poznan, Poznań, Poland	Adam Mickiewicz	Polish poet
Albert Einstein College of Medicine, Bronx, New York, US	Albert Einstein	World renowned physicist; on March 15, 1953, the day following his 74th birthday, Einstein formally agreed to permit his name to be used for the first medical school to be built in New York City since 1897.
Allama Iqbal Open University, Islamabad, Pakistan	Muhammad Iqbal	National poet of Pakistan
Allame Tabatabayee University, Tehran, Iran	Allame Tabatabayee	Iranian Islamic cleric
Ambedkar Institute of Advanced Communication Technologies and Research, Delhi, India	Bhimrao Ramji Ambedkar	Indian jurist, scholar and political leader who was the chief architect of the Indian Constitution, an opponent of the caste system, a Buddhist revivalist, and one of the first Untouchables to obtain a college education in India
Amirkabir University of Technology, Tehran, Iran	Amir Kabir	Prime minister of Persia in the 19th century
Andrews University, Michigan, US	John Nevins Andrews	Adventist scholar who was the first officially sponsored overseas missionary for the Seventh-day Adventist Church
Anton Bruckner Private University, Linz, Austria	Anton Bruckner	Austrian composer
Antonin Scalia Law School, Virginia, US	Antonin Scalia	Established in 1972 as the International School of Law (ISL) in Washington, D.C.; merged with George Mason University in 1979 to become the George Mason University School of Law. It was renamed in July 2016 in honor of the late Supreme Court Associate Justice Antonin Scalia, who died in February 2016.
Aristotle University of Thessaloniki, Greece	Aristotle	Greek philosopher
Arturo Prat University, Chile	Arturo Prat	Chilean military hero
Austin College, Texas, US	Stephen F. Austin	Major figure in the history of Texas, Texas hero, known as "Father of Texas"
Babasaheb Bhimrao Ambedkar University, Lucknow, India	Bhimrao Ramji Ambedkar	Indian jurist, scholar and political leader who was the chief architect of the Indian Constitution, an opponent of the caste system, a Buddhist revivalist, and one of the first Untouchables to obtain a college education in India
Barkatullah University, Bhopal, India	Maulana Barkatullah Bhopali	In 1988 Bhopal University was renamed for this scholar (1854–1927) who was an early advocate for Indian independence.
University of California, Berkeley, US	George Berkeley	Name includes its location, the city of Berkeley, California, which in turn was named for the Anglo-Irish philosopher noted for his work on Immaterialism.
Shahid Bhagat Singh College, Delhi, India	Bhagat Singh	Indian freedom fighter and revolutionary
Bharathiar University, Tamil Nadu, India	Subramania Bharathiar	Tamil poet
Bharathidasan University, Tamil Nadu, India	Bharathidasan	Tamil poet and author
Bidhan Chandra College, Asansol, West Bengal, India	Bidhan Chandra Roy	Physician and second Chief Minister of West Bengal
Bidhan Chandra College, Rishra, West Bengal, India	Bidhan Chandra Roy	Physician and second Chief Minister of West Bengal
Bidhan Chandra Krishi Viswa Vidyalaya, West Bengal, India	Bidhan Chandra Roy	Physician and second Chief Minister of West Bengal
Birsa Agricultural University, Ranchi, Jharkhand State, India	Birsa Munda	Leader in 19th-century Indian independence movement
Brandeis University, Massachusetts, US	Louis Brandeis	First Jewish Justice of the United States Supreme Court
Brock University, Ontario, Canada	Isaac Brock	British Major General Sir Isaac Brock died during the Battle of Queenston Heights in the War of 1812, near the site of the campus.
Brunel University, England	Isambard Kingdom Brunel	British engineer remembered for his major accomplishments in design and development of civil works
Bryan College, Tennessee, US	William Jennings Bryan	American lawyer, statesman, politician, and renowned public speaker, who died five days after his participation in the Scopes Trial, near the site of the future college
Carl von Ossietzky University of Oldenburg, Germany	Carl von Ossietzky	German journalist, publisher, and pacifist, awarded the 1935 Nobel Peace Prize, 1889–1938
Carlos III University, Madrid, Spain	Charles III of Spain	King of Spain, 1759–88
Cayetano Heredia University, Lima, Peru	Cayetano Heredia	19th-century Peruvian physician
Centro Federal de Educação Tecnológica Celso Suckow da Fonseca, Rio de Janeiro, Brazil	Celso Suckow da Fonseca	Brazilian engineer and educator, first director of the Center
Champlain Regional College Quebec Canada	Samuel de Champlain	The first governor of New France.
Chandra Shekhar Azad University of Agriculture and Technology, Uttar Pradesh, India	Chandrasekhar Azad	Indian revolutionary
Charles Darwin University, Northern Territory, Australia	Charles Darwin	English naturalist best known for his theory of natural selection, which forms the basis of modern evolutionary theory
Charles Sturt University, New South Wales and Australian Capital Territory, Australia	Charles Sturt	English explorer of Australia
Chaudhary Charan Singh Haryana Agricultural University, Haryana State, India	Choudhary Charan Singh	Hissar Agricultural University was renamed in honor of Singh, a former Prime Minister of India.
Chaudhary Charan Singh University, Uttar Pradesh, India	Choudhary Charan Singh	Founded in 1966 as Meerut University, was later renamed in honor of Singh, Prime Minister of India in 1979-1980
Chhatrapati Shahu Ji Maharaj University, Kanpur, Uttar Pradesh, India	Chhatrapati Shahu Ji Maharaj	Shahu Ji was a ruler of Kolhapur who introduced reservation for downtrodden classes in his kingdom in 1902; in 2002 King George Medical College in Lucknow was also renamed in his honor
Chifley Business School, Adelaide, Australia	Ben Chifley	A Prime Minister of Australia
Christopher Newport University, Virginia, US	Christopher Newport	Captain of the ship that brought the first English settlers to Jamestown, Virginia
Clark Atlanta University, Georgia, US	Davis Wasgatt Clark	First president of the Freedman's Aid Society, abolitionist organization which assisted fugitive slaves
Université Claude Bernard Lyon 1, Lyon, France	Claude Bernard	French physiologist
Curtin University of Technology, Western Australia, Australia	John Curtin	Fourteenth Prime Minister of Australia
D'Annunzio University of Chieti–Pescara, Italy	Gabriele D'Annunzio	Italian writer and poet, member of the Italian Army during World War I
Daniel Webster College, New Hampshire, US	Daniel Webster	19th-century American statesman
Davidson College, North Carolina, US	William Lee Davidson	American Revolutionary war general
De Montfort University, Leicester, England	Simon de Montfort	Earl of Leicester in the 13th century
Deakin University, Victoria, Australia	Alfred Deakin	Australia's second Prime Minister
Democritus University of Thrace, Greece	Democritus	Greek philosopher
Devi Ahilya University, Madhya Pradesh, India	Devi Ahilya Bai Holkar	Female ruler of the Malwa kingdom, India, in the 18th century
Douglas College, British Columbia, Canada	Sir James Douglas	Canadian Lieutenant Governor
Dr. Babasaheb Ambedkar Marathwada University, Aurangabad, Maharashtra, India	Bhimrao Ramji Ambedkar	Indian jurist, scholar and political leader who was the chief architect of the Indian Constitution, an opponent of the caste system, a Buddhist revivalist, and one of the first Untouchables to obtain a college education in India
Dr. B.R. Ambedkar Open University, Hyderabad, India	Bhimrao Ramji Ambedkar	Originally Andhra Pradesh Open University, was renamed for Ambedkar in 1991. See above for information on namesake.
Dr. Bhimrao Ambedkar University, Agra, India	Bhimrao Ramji Ambedkar	See above for information on namesake.
Edith Cowan University, Western Australia	Edith Cowan	First woman to be elected to an Australian Parliament
Emily Carr University of Art and Design, Vancouver, British Columbia, Canada	Emily Carr	Canadian artist and writer inspired by the first nations people and wilderness of British Columbia.
Emory University, Georgia, US	John Emory	American bishop of the Methodist Episcopal Church
Emory and Henry University, Virginia, US	John Emory and Patrick Henry	American bishop of the Methodist Episcopal Church and American patriot, respectively
Erasmus University Rotterdam, Netherlands	Desiderius Erasmus	Dutch humanist and theologian (died 1536)
Fisk University, Tennessee, US	Clinton B. Fisk	Officer in the Reconstruction era Freedmen's Bureau
Flinders University, Adelaide, Australia	Matthew Flinders	Navigator and explorer
Francis Marion University, South Carolina, US	Francis Marion	American Revolutionary War hero who was nicknamed the "Swamp Fox" for successfully using guerrilla tactics to out-fox the British on swampy terrain in South Carolina
Universidad Francisco Marroquín, Guatemala City, Guatemala	Francisco Marroquín	first bishop of Guatemala, in the 16th century
Collège François-Xavier-Garneau Quebec, Quebec, Canada	François-Xavier Garneau	nineteenth-century French Canadian poet, historian, civil servant and liberal
Franklin & Marshall College, Pennsylvania, US	Benjamin Franklin and John Marshall	American founding father and Chief Justice of the United States from 1801 to 1835, respectively
Franklin College Switzerland, Lugano, Switzerland	Benjamin Franklin	American founding father who was the United States' first ambassador to Europe
Franklin Pierce University, New Hampshire, US	Franklin Pierce	14th President of the United States, and the only one to date from New Hampshire. The law school, originally a private institution, became a public school in 2010 as the University of New Hampshire School of Law.
Franklin Pierce Law Center, New Hampshire, US	Franklin Pierce	14th President of the United States, and the only one to date from New Hampshire. The law school, originally a private institution, became a public school in 2010 as the University of New Hampshire School of Law.
Friedrich Schiller University of Jena, Thuringia, Germany	Friedrich Schiller	German writer
Froebel College (University of Roehampton)	Friedrich Fröbel	A German pedagogue, a student of Johann Heinrich Pestalozzi, who laid the foundation for modern education based on the recognition that children have unique needs and capabilities.
Froebel College of Education, Dublin, Ireland	Friedrich Fröbel	A German pedagogue, a student of Johann Heinrich Pestalozzi, who laid the foundation for modern education based on the recognition that children have unique needs and capabilities.
Universitas Gadjah Mada, Indonesia	Patih Gadjah Mada	Famous military leader and prime minister (mahapatih) of the 14th century Majapahit Empire
George Mason University, Virginia, US	George Mason	American statesman and author of the Virginia Declaration of Rights
The George Washington University, Washington, DC, US	George Washington	
Glyndŵr University, Wrexham, Wales	Owain Glyndŵr	Welsh prince who first suggested the establishment of universities throughout Wales in the early 15th century.
Gokhale Institute of Politics and Economics (GIPE), Maharashtra, India	Gopal Krishna Gokhale	Indian nationalist leader. The institute is located in the premises of the Servants of India Society, which he established in 1905. The grounds include his bungalow and a massive banyan tree under which Gokhale and M.K. Gandhi discussed political issues.
Gordon College, Georgia, US	General John B. Gordon	Confederate corps commander in the American Civil War; later served three terms in the U.S. Senate and two terms as Georgia Governor
Govind Ballabh Pant University of Agriculture & Technology, Uttarakhand, India	Govind Ballabh Pant	Indian freedom fighter
Griffith University, Queensland, Australia	Samuel Griffith	Premier of Queensland, Chief Justice of the High Court of Australia and the main author of the Constitution of Australia.
Gustavus Adolphus College, Minnesota, US	Gustavus Adolphus of Sweden	King of Sweden
Hampden–Sydney College, Virginia, US	John Hampden & Algernon Sydney	
Heinrich Heine University of Düsseldorf, Germany	Heinrich Heine	German poet, born in Düsseldorf
Hemwati Nandan Bahuguna Garhwal University, Uttar Pradesh, India	Hemwati Nandan Bahuguna	Garhwal University, founded 1973, was renamed in 1989 following the death of Shri Hemwati Nandan Bahuguna, Indian statesman born in the district of Pauri Garhwal.
Heriot-Watt University, Edinburgh, Scotland	George Heriot and James Watt	
Homi Bhabha National Institute, Mumbai, India	Homi J. Bhabha	Indian nuclear physicist and the chief architect of the Indian atomic energy program.
Howard University, Washington, DC, US	Oliver O. Howard	Union general in the American Civil War and later commissioner of the Freedmen's Bureau, a U.S. federal agency that sought to help newly freed slaves during Reconstruction.
Huntingdon College, Alabama, US	Selina Hastings, Countess of Huntingdon	18th-century English religious leader who played a prominent part in the Methodist movement. The Women's College of Alabama was renamed in her honor shortly after it admitted its first male student.
Indira Gandhi Agricultural University, Madhya Pradesh, India	Indira Gandhi	Prime Minister of India
Indira Gandhi Institute of Development Research, Mumbai, India	Indira Gandhi	
Indira Gandhi National Open University, New Delhi, India	Indira Gandhi	
Ivan Franko National University of L'viv, Ukraine	Ivan Franko	Ukrainian writer and political activist
Jaiprakash University, Bihar, India	Jai Prakash Narayan	Indian freedom fighter and political leader
James Madison University, Virginia, US	James Madison	Principal author of the United States Constitution and fourth President of the United States. The school, founded in 1908 as The State Normal and Industrial School for Women at Harrisonburg, first named itself after him in 1938 as Madison College, adopting its current name in 1976.
Jawaharlal Nehru Technological University, Andhra Pradesh, India	Jawaharlal Nehru	first Prime Minister of India
Jawaharlal Nehru University, New Delhi, India	Jawaharlal Nehru	first Prime Minister of India
James Cook University, Queensland, Australia	James Cook	British sea captain and explorer
Jiwaji University, Madhya Pradesh, India	Jiwaji Rao Scindia	Last Scindia Maharaja of Ujjain and Gwalior
Johann Wolfgang Goethe University of Frankfurt am Main, Germany	Johann Wolfgang von Goethe	
Johannes Gutenberg University of Mainz, Germany	Johann Gutenberg	
Johannes Kepler University of Linz, Austria	Johannes Kepler	German mathematician and astronomer
John Abbott College Sainte-Anne-de-Bellevue, Quebec Canada	Sir John Abbott	Third Prime Minister of Canada
John Cabot University, Italy	John Cabot	Italian navigator and explorer
John Jay College of Criminal Justice, US	John Jay	First Chief Justice of the United States, governor of New York
Josephine Butler College (Durham University), England	Josephine Butler	Victorian era feminist
Judson College (Alabama), US	Ann Hasseltine Judson	First American Baptist woman to serve as an overseas missionary
Judson University, Illinois, US	Adoniram Judson	First American Baptist man to serve as an overseas missionary
Kennedy-King College, Illinois, US	Robert F. Kennedy and Martin Luther King Jr.	Founded as Woodrow Wilson Junior College in 1935 and renamed in 1969 in honor of the two leaders who had been assassinated, just eight weeks apart, in 1968
King Abdulaziz University, Jeddah, Saudi Arabia	Ibn Saud of Saudi Arabia	
K.N. Toosi University of Technology, Tehran, Iran	Nasīr al-Dīn al-Tūsī	Persian scientist (1201–1274) known as a philosopher, mathematician, astronomer, theologian, physician, and prolific writer
Kyiv Shevchenko University, Kyiv, Ukraine	Taras Shevchenko	Ukrainian poet, artist, and humanist
La Trobe University, Victoria, Australia	Charles La Trobe	First Lieutenant-Governor of Victoria. Oversaw the separation from New South Wales. Had a significant input into the construction of inner Melbourne parks such as the Botanic Gardens, as well as providing leadership, prestige and support to such institutions as the Royal Melbourne Hospital, the Royal Philharmonic and the University of Melbourne.
Lafayette College, Pennsylvania, US	Gilbert du Motier, marquis de Lafayette	French general and American Revolutionary War hero. The school's founders were inspired by Lafayette's visit to the U.S. in 1824–25, which was ongoing when they first discussed founding a college.
Lalit Narayan Mithila University, Bihar State, India	Lalit Narayan Mishra	Originally Mithila University; renamed in 1975 after the assassination of Indian political leader Mishra
Lamar University, Texas, US	Mirabeau B. Lamar	Major figure in the history of Texas - Second president of the Republic of Texas, known as "Father of Texas Education" because of his leadership in setting aside public lands for education.
Lambuth University, Tennessee, US	Walter Russell Lambuth	pioneer Methodist missionary bishop
Lehman College, New York, US	Herbert Lehman	Governor of New York
Lincoln Memorial University, Tennessee, US	Abraham Lincoln	16th President of the United States. The naming of the schools in Missouri and Pennsylvania, both founded to educate African Americans, was specifically inspired by Lincoln's signing of the Emancipation Proclamation.
Lincoln University (California), US	Abraham Lincoln	16th President of the United States. The naming of the schools in Missouri and Pennsylvania, both founded to educate African Americans, was specifically inspired by Lincoln's signing of the Emancipation Proclamation.
Lincoln University of Missouri, US	Abraham Lincoln	16th President of the United States. The naming of the schools in Missouri and Pennsylvania, both founded to educate African Americans, was specifically inspired by Lincoln's signing of the Emancipation Proclamation.
Lincoln University (Pennsylvania), US	Abraham Lincoln	16th President of the United States. The naming of the schools in Missouri and Pennsylvania, both founded to educate African Americans, was specifically inspired by Lincoln's signing of the Emancipation Proclamation.
Liverpool John Moores University, England	John Moores	
Macquarie University, Sydney, Australia	Lachlan Macquarie	Early governor of the colony of New South Wales
Madurai Kamaraj University, Tamil Nadu, India	Kamaraj	Politician who was Chief Minister of Tamil Nadu
Maharishi Dayanand University, Rohtak, Haryana, India	Swami Dayananda	Indian social reformer
Mahatma Gandhi International Hindi University	Mahatma Gandhi	
Mahatma Gandhi University, Kerala, India	Mahatma Gandhi	
Mahatma Jyotiba Phule Rohilkhand University, Uttar Pradesh, India	Jyotiba Phule	19th century social activist who in 1848 opened India's first school for girls
Makhanlal Chaturvedi National University of Journalism and Communication, Bhopal, Madhya Pradesh, India	Makhan Lal Chaturvedi	Indian freedom fighter, poet and journalist
Malcolm X College, Illinois, US	Malcolm X	African American civil rights activist
Maria Curie-Sklodowska University, Lublin, Poland	Maria Sklodowska-Curie	Polish-French physicist and chemist most famous for her pioneering research on radioactivity
Universidad Mariano Galvez, Guatemala City, Guatemala	Mariano Gálvez	Guatemalan political leader
Marquette University, Wisconsin, US	Father Jacques Marquette	French Jesuit missionary and explorer; one of the first Europeans to explore the interior of modern-day Wisconsin
Marshall University, West Virginia, US	John Marshall	Chief Justice of the United States from 1801 to 1835
University of Mary Washington, Virginia, US	Mary Ball Washington	Founded in 1908 as The State Normal and Industrial School for Women, was renamed in 1938 in honor of the mother of George Washington
Massey University, New Zealand	William Massey	Former prime minister of New Zealand
Maulana Azad National Urdu University, Hyderabad, India	Maulana Abul Kalam Azad	Muslim scholar and a leader of the Indian independence movement
McNeese State University, Lake Charles, Louisiana	John McNeese	Educator in Lake Charles, Louisiana. Superintendent of schools and promoter of education in the state of Louisiana.
Miguel Hernández University, Alicante, Spain	Miguel Hernández	Spanish poet
Mohan Lal Sukhadia University, Udaipur, Rajasthan, India	Mohan Lal Sukhadia	Originally Udaipur University; was renamed in 1984 in respect of Sukhadia, the architect of modern Rajasthan
Monash University, Australia	General John Monash	Australian civil engineer and military commander of the First World War
Mother Teresa Women's University, Tamil Nadu, India	Mother Teresa	Roman Catholic nun who founded the Missionaries of Charity and ministered to the poor, sick, orphaned, and dying in India and other countries.
Murdoch University, Western Australia	Walter Murdoch	Australian academic and essayist
Napier University, Edinburgh, Scotland	John Napier	Mathematician who was born on the site of the modern university
Narendra Dev University of Agriculture and Technology, India	Acharya Narendra Deva	A leading theorist of India's Congress Socialist Party; the school was named in his honor in 1975.
Naresuan University, Thailand	King Naresuan the Great	King of Siam (now Thailand) from 1590 to 1605
National Cheng Kung University, Taiwan, Republic of China	Cheng Cheng-kung (Koxinga)	Military leader at the end of the Chinese Ming Dynasty, a leader of the anti-Qing movement opposing the Qing Dynasty, and a general who defeated the Dutch to claim Taiwan in 1662.
National Chung Cheng University, Taiwan, Republic of China	Chiang Kai-shek	Chinese military and political leader who assumed the leadership of the Kuomintang after the death of Sun Yat-sen in 1925 and led the national government of the Republic of China from 1928 to 1975.
National and Kapodistrian University of Athens, Greece	John Capodistria	First head of state of independent Greece
Nelson Mandela University, South Africa	Nelson Mandela	First president of post-apartheid South Africa
Newman University, Birmingham, West Midlands, UK	John Henry Newman	Englishman who served as a Roman Catholic cardinal
Newman University (Kansas), Kansas, US	John Henry Newman	Englishman who served as a Roman Catholic cardinal
Netaji Subhas Open University, West Bengal, India	Subhas Chandra Bose	Prominent leader of the Indian Independence Movement
Nicolaus Copernicus University in Torun, Poland	Nicolaus Copernicus	Astronomer, born there in 1473
Nnamdi Azikiwe University, Anambra State, Nigeria	Nnamdi Azikiwe	A champion of Nigerian independence who became the nation's first president
Oberlin College, Ohio, US	Jean-Frédéric Oberlin	Alsatian clergyman and philanthropist remembered for his efforts to improve the lives of his impoverished parishioners
Oglethorpe University, Georgia, US	James Oglethorpe	Englishman who established the colony of Georgia
Osmania Medical College, Hyderabad, India	Osman Ali Khan	7th Nizam of the kingdom Hyderabad
Otto von Guericke University of Magdeburg, Germany	Otto von Guericke	Germany physicist of the 17th century
University of Paris V: René Descartes, France	René Descartes	French philosopher, mathematician, scientist, and writer
University of Paris VI: Pierre et Marie Curie, France	Pierre Curie, Marie Curie	Physicists
University of Paris VII: Denis Diderot, France	Denis Diderot	French philosopher
Patrick Henry College, Purcellville, VA	Patrick Henry	One of the Founding Fathers of the United States, first Governor of Virginia, and quoted for his famous phrase: "Give me liberty or give me death!" Patrick Henry is a Christian institution with the mission of training students through a classical liberal arts curriculum and apprenticeship methodology to impact the world 'for Christ and for Liberty'.
Periyar University, Tamil Nadu, India	Periyar Ramasami	Indian social reformer and politician
President Ramon Magsaysay State University, Iba, Zambales, Philippines	Ramon Magsaysay	Seventh President of the Republic of the Philippines
Prince of Songkhla University, Thailand	Mahidol Adulyadej	Prince Father Mahidol Adulyadej, Prince of Songkhla (1892–1929) was the father of King Ananda Mahidol (Rama VIII) and King Bhumibol Adulyadej (Rama IX) and is regarded as the father of modern medicine and public health of Thailand.
Pompeu Fabra University, Catalonia	Pompeu Fabra	Pompeu Fabra was a Catalan linguist considered the main author of the normative reform of contemporary Catalan grammar.
Quaid-i-Azam University, Islamabad, Pakistan	Mohammad Ali Jinnah	Quaid-e-Azam (Urdu: قائد اعظم — "Great Leader") is an honorific title for Jinnah, the politician and leader of the All India Muslim League who founded Pakistan and served as its first Governor-General.
Queen Margaret University, Edinburgh, Scotland	Queen/Saint Margaret of Scotland	Founded in 1875, named for the queen of Scotland who died in 1093
Rabindra Bharati University, West Bengal, India	Rabindranath Tagore	Bengali poet and philosopher
Rajarshi Shahu College of Engineering, Pune, India	Rajarshi Shahu	Maharaja of the Indian princely state of Kolhapur between 1884 and 1922.
Rajiv Gandhi University of Health Sciences, Karnataka, India	Rajiv Gandhi	
Ramon Llull University, Catalonia	Ramon Llull	Medieval Catalan philosopher and writer, who wrote the first major work of Catalan language literature, is sometimes considered a pioneer of computation theory, and whose work anticipated by several centuries prominent theoretical work on voting systems.
Randolph–Macon College, Virginia, US	John Randolph and Nathaniel Macon	When the Virginia Conference of the Methodist Church established the college in 1830, it named it for two non-Methodists to dispel the notion that the school would be sectarian. The non-Methodist namesakes were Randolph, a Virginia statesman, and Macon, a North Carolina statesman.
Randolph College (Randolph–Macon Woman's College before July 2007), Virginia, US	John Randolph	Virginia statesman
Rani Durgavati University, Madhya Pradesh, India	Rani Durgavati	Originally the University of Jabalpur; was renamed in 1983 for the Gond dynasty queen of Garha Mandla (1524–1564)
Robert Gordon University, Aberdeen, Scotland	Robert Gordon	17th century merchant and philanthropist.
Robert Morris University, Illinois, US	Robert Morris	Merchant known as the "Financier of the American Revolution"; signer of the U.S. Declaration of Independence, Articles of Confederation, and Constitution.
Robert Morris University, Pennsylvania, US	Robert Morris	Merchant known as the "Financier of the American Revolution"; signer of the U.S. Declaration of Independence, Articles of Confederation, and Constitution.
Roger Williams University, Rhode Island, US	Roger Williams	Founder of the Colony of Rhode Island and Providence Plantations, which would become the state of Rhode Island, and first major American proponent of religious freedom and church–state separation
Roosevelt University, Illinois, US	Franklin and Eleanor Roosevelt	32nd President of the United States and his wife, a civil rights advocate in her own right. The school was originally named Thomas Jefferson College, but renamed after Franklin died two weeks later.
Rosalind Franklin University of Medicine and Science, Illinois, US	Rosalind Franklin	British biophysicist and X-ray crystallographer who made critical contributions to the understanding of the fine molecular structures of DNA (deoxyribonucleic acid), RNA, viruses, coal, and graphite
University of Rovira i Virgili, Catalonia	Antoni Rovira i Virgili	Politician and journalist who was president of the regional parliament of Catalonia in exile after the Spanish Civil War
Toronto Metropolitan University (former Ryerson University), Toronto, Ontario, Canada	Egerton Ryerson	Nineteenth century educator, politician, and Methodist minister, known as the father of Ontario's public school system
Sam Houston State University, Texas, US	Sam Houston	Major figure in the history of Texas—leader of the Texas Revolution, first and third President of the Republic of Texas, U.S. Senator, and 7th Governor of Texas
Sardar Patel University, Gujarat, India	Vallabhbhai Patel	Political and social leader of India who played a major role in the country's struggle for independence
Schiller International University, US-based	Friedrich Schiller	
Shahid Beheshti University and Shahid Beheshti University of Medical Sciences, Iran	Mohammad Hosseiny Beheshti	The former National University of Iran was renamed in 1983 in honor of Beheshti, a leader of Iran's Islamic revolution who is called Shahid (martyr) after his 1981 death in a bomb explosion.
Sher-e-Kashmir University of Agricultural Sciences and Technology of Kashmir, Jammu and Kashmir, India	Sheikh Mohammad Abdullah	Kashmiri leader who is popularly known as Sher-e-Kashmir (Lion of Kashmir)
Shivaji University, Maharashtra, India	Shivaji	Founder of the Maratha empire in 1674; considered a hero in Maharashtra
Simon Fraser University, British Columbia, Canada	Simon Fraser	Fur trader and explorer who charted much of what is now British Columbia
Simón Bolívar University, Caracas, Venezuela	Simón Bolívar	leader of several independence movements throughout South America
Sri Krishnadevaraya University	Krishnadevaraya	Sri Krishnadevaraya, ruler of the Vijayanagara empire in the 16th century, was a patron of learning and the arts.
Stephen F. Austin State University, Texas, US	Stephen F. Austin	Major figure in the history of Texas - Texas hero, known as "Father of Texas"
Sul Ross State University, Texas, US	Lawrence Sullivan "Sul" Ross	19th Governor of Texas and later president of the Agricultural and Mechanical College of Texas, now known as Texas A&M University
Suranaree University of Technology, Thailand	Thao Suranaree	Local heroine of Nakhon Ratchasima, Thailand, who is credited with saving the city from the rebel army during King Anouvong's rebellion of 1827
Swami Ramanand Teerth Marathwada University, Maharashtra, India	Swami Ramanand Teerth	Educator and social activist remembered for his role in the Hyderabad liberation struggle.
Tamil Nadu Dr. Ambedkar Law University, Tamil Nadu, India	Bhimrao Ramji Ambedkar	Indian jurist, scholar and political leader who was the chief architect of the Indian Constitution
The Tamil Nadu Dr. M.G.R. Medical University, Tamil Nadu, India	M.G. Ramachandran	Namesake was the former Chief Minister of Tamil Nadu
Thomas Jefferson University, Philadelphia, Pennsylvania, United States	Thomas Jefferson	Author of the Declaration of Independence, of the Statute of Virginia for Religious Freedom, leader of the Jeffersonian Democratic-Republicans and America's third president
Torrens University Australia, Adelaide, Australia	Robert Torrens	Former Premier of South Australia
Truman State University, Missouri, US	Harry S. Truman	United States president
Tunku Abdul Rahman University College, Kuala Lumpur, Malaysia	Tunku Abdul Rahman	First Chief Minister of Malaysia
Underwood International College, Seoul, South Korea	Horace Grant Underwood	American missionary and founder of Yonsei University in Korea
Universidade Estadual Paulista "Júlio de Mesquita Filho", São Paulo, Brazil	Júlio de Mesquita Filho	Brazilian influential publisher, founder and owner of the O Estado de S. Paulo newspaper
Universidade Estácio de Sá, Rio de Janeiro, Brazil	Estácio de Sá	Portuguese knight and military officer who was the founder of the city of Rio de Janeiro.
Universidad José Cecilio del Valle, Tegucigalpa, Honduras	José Cecilio del Valle	Honduran intellectual, nicknamed "the Wise" who drafted and wrote the Act of Independence of Central America.
Universiti Tunku Abdul Rahman, Perak & Selangor, Malaysia	Tunku Abdul Rahman	First Chief Minister of Malaysia
Uttar Pradesh Rajarshi Tandon Open University, Uttar Pradesh, India	Rajarshi Tandon	Indian independence fighter
Washington & Jefferson College, Pennsylvania, US	George Washington and Thomas Jefferson	American founding fathers and the nation's first and third presidents (respectively)
Washington University in St. Louis, Missouri, US	George Washington	Originally named for one of its founders, Unitarian minister William Greenleaf Eliot, who did not want the institution to bear his name; renamed in 1854 for its original location on Washington Avenue in Downtown St. Louis (the avenue in turn was named for George Washington)
Whitman College, Washington, US	Marcus and Narcissa Whitman	Pioneer Christian missionaries in Walla Walla, Washington, (site of the college) who were murdered by the Cayuse and Umatilla
Whittier College, California, US	John Greenleaf Whittier	American poet
Wilfrid Laurier University, Ontario, Canada	Wilfrid Laurier	Waterloo Lutheran University dropped its church affiliation in 1973, becoming a public institution named for an earlier Prime Minister of Canada
Wilkes University, Pennsylvania, US	John Wilkes	
William Paterson University, New Jersey, US	William Paterson	
Yashwantrao Chavan Maharashtra Open University, Maharashtra, India	Yashwantrao Chavan	Chief Minister of Maharashtra and subsequently Deputy Prime Minister of India
Vesalius College, Brussels, Belgium	Andreas Vesalius	Physician who was the founder of modern anatomy
Vidyasagar University, West Bengal, India	Ishwar Chandra Vidyasagar	19th-century academic, philosopher, educator, printer, entrepreneur, writer, translator, reformer and philanthropist
Visweswaraiah Technological University, Karnataka, India	Mokshagundam Visvesvarayya	Indian engineer and statesman
Walters State Community College, Tennessee, US	Herbert S. Walters	Banker and politician who served for a short time in the U.S. Senate
Walter Sisulu University for Technology and Science, Eastern Cape Province, South Africa	Walter Sisulu	South African anti-apartheid activist and member of the African National Congress
Wright State University, Ohio, US	The Wright brothers	Named for the inventors of the first successful airplane, who lived in nearby Dayton

== See also ==
- Lists of etymologies
- List of university and college namesakes
