= List of university and college namesakes =

Persons for whom colleges or universities were named.

- Jacob Albright
- Richard Allen (reverend)
- Saint Andrew
- James Osgood Andrew
- Francis Asbury
- Osman Cleander Baker
- John Baldwin (educator)
- Benjamin Bates IV
- LaVerne H. Bates
- Robert Bellarmine
- Mary McLeod Bethune
- Warren Akin Candler
- Andrew Carnegie
- Davis Wasgatt Clark
- Ezra Cornell
- Jean-Baptiste de la Salle
- Washington C. DePauw
- John Emory
- Simon Fraser
- Robert Gordon
- Leonidas Lent Hamline
- John Harvard (clergyman)
- Eugene Russell Hendrix
- Thomas Jefferson
- Patrick Henry
- George Heriot
- William Samuel Johnson known as Columbia college.
- Walter Russell Lambuth
- Robert E. Lee
- Edith Lesley
- James Madison
- Albertus Magnus
- William McKendree
- William Fletcher McMurry
- Andrew W. Mellon known as Carnegie Mellon University.
- Reuben Webster Millsaps
- Petro Mohyla known as Petro Mohyla Black Sea National University.
- John Moores (merchant)
- Henry Muhlenberg
- John Frederick Oberlin
- Daniel Payne Closed in 1979
- George Pepperdine
- Jean Piaget Two universities in different countries are named after him, Mozambique and Angola
- William Paul Quinn
- B. T. Roberts
- Oral Roberts
- Bénilde Romançon
- John Ruskin shortened to ARU
- Albert Benjamin Simpson
- Matthew Simpson
- Leland Stanford Jr.
- William Taylor (bishop)
- Stephen Van Rensselaer III
- George Washington
- James Watt and George Heriot Heriot-Watt University.
- John Wesley
- William Wilberforce
- Jawaharlal Nehru
- Mahatma Gandhi
- Indira Gandhi
- Rajiv Gandhi
- Sorbonne University
- Gustave Eiffel University
- Claude Bernard University Lyon 1
- Lumière University Lyon 2
- Jean Moulin University Lyon 3
- Bordeaux Montaigne University
- University of Picardy Jules Verne
- Jean Monnet University
- Toulouse III - Paul Sabatier University
- Vitebsk State University.
- Satbayev University.
- Johns Hopkins University
- Stanford University
- Vanderbilt University
- George Mason University
- Emory University
- Bates College
- LMU Munich
- University of Jena
- Humboldt University of Berlin

== See also ==
- List of colleges and universities named after people
