= Cândido Mendes =

Cândido Mendes may refer to:

- Cândido Mendes de Almeida (1818–1881), Brazilian lawyer, journalist and politician
- Cândido Mendes, Maranhão, a Brazilian municipality
- Cândido Mendes University, a private university in Rio de Janeiro, Brazil
