= Smith v. Bates Technical College =

2000 Washington Supreme Court decision

Smith v. Bates Technical College, 991 P.2d 1135 (Wash. 2000), is a Washington Supreme Court decision that addressed two key issues in employment law: whether the common-law tort of wrongful discharge in violation of public policy applies to employees who can only be terminated for cause, and whether such a tort claim requires exhaustion of administrative or contractual remedies.

The logo of Bates Technical College, where Kelly Smith was employed, and whom she sued

Kelly Smith, a traffic programmer at KBTC-TV and a unionized state employee, was employed by Bates Technical College from 1986 until her termination in 1994. Protected by a Collective bargaining agreement, she could only be discharged for cause. During her tenure, Smith filed several grievances and Unfair labor practice complaints with the Public Employment Relations Commission (PERC), alleging retaliation and misconduct by her supervisors. Before PERC ruled on those complaints, she filed a lawsuit in Pierce County Superior Court asserting claims for wrongful discharge in violation of public policy, defamation, and First Amendment retaliation under 42 U.S.C. § 1983.

In its ruling, the Court held that wrongful discharge protections extend beyond At-will employees to include those covered by civil service laws or Collective bargaining agreements. It also found that exhaustion of union or administrative procedures is not a prerequisite to filing a tort claim based on public policy. The decision thus clarified that contractual or statutory job protections do not preclude access to common-law remedies.

== Background ==
Kelly Smith was employed by Bates Technical College as a traffic programmer at KBTC-TV from February 1986 until her termination in February 1994. As a state employee covered by a Collective bargaining Agreement (CBA), she could only be terminated for cause under RCW 41.56 and the terms of the CBA. During her tenure, Smith filed multiple grievances and Unfair labor practice (ULP) complaints with the Public Employment Relations Commission (PERC), alleging retaliation and misconduct by her supervisors.

Before PERC issued a ruling on those complaints, Smith filed a lawsuit in Pierce County Superior Court against the College and several individual administrators. Her claims included wrongful discharge in violation of public policy, defamation, and retaliation in violation of the First Amendment under 42 U.S.C. § 1983. The case raised questions about the scope of wrongful discharge protections for non–at-will employees and the constitutional limits on public employee speech.

== Argument ==
Smith argued that (1) the common law tort of wrongful discharge in violation of public policy should extend beyond at-will employment to include employees like herself who can only be terminated for cause; (2) she was not required to exhaust her union grievance procedures or PERC remedies before pursuing a tort claim in court; and (3) her filing of grievances and Unfair labor practice complaints constituted protected activity under the First Amendment's petition clause, making her eligible for relief under 42 U.S.C. § 1983.

In response, Bates Technical College contended that the wrongful discharge tort is historically limited to at-will employees; those lacking contractual or statutory job protections. Since Smith was covered by a Collective bargaining agreement and had access to administrative remedies through PERC, the College argued she was obligated to exhaust those remedies before pursuing a separate tort action. Regarding the § 1983 claim, the College maintained that Smith’s grievances were personal in nature and did not address matters of public concern, which is a required threshold for constitutional protection under the First Amendment.

== Decision ==
=== Lower courts ===
The Pierce County Superior Court granted summary judgment in favor of Bates Technical College, dismissing Kelly Smith’s wrongful discharge claim on the grounds that she had failed to exhaust her administrative and contractual remedies. The court also dismissed her § 1983 claim, finding that her grievance activity did not involve matters of public concern and thus was not protected under the First Amendment. The Washington Court of Appeals affirmed the trial court’s rulings in an unpublished opinion. The Washington Supreme Court granted review, limited to the wrongful discharge and § 1983 issues.

=== Supreme Court decision ===
Wrongful discharge claim: The Washington Supreme Court reversed the lower courts. Writing for the majority, Justice Sanders held that the tort of wrongful discharge in violation of public policy applies to all employees—including those terminable only for cause under civil service rules or Collective bargaining agreements. The Court emphasized that the basis of the tort lies in enforcing public policy, not in filling contractual gaps, and therefore does not require an employee to first exhaust administrative or contractual grievance procedures before filing suit.

§ 1983 claim: The Court affirmed the dismissal. It held that Smith’s grievance activity and labor complaints involved only private employment matters, not issues of public concern. As such, her actions did not qualify for protection under the First Amendment's petition clause, and she could not state a valid claim under § 1983.

== Significance ==
This decision confirms that the tort of wrongful discharge in violation of public policy is available to employees regardless of their at-will status. By extending the tort to workers covered by Collective bargaining agreements and civil service protections, the Court rejected the argument that contractual remedies displace tort-based claims when fundamental public policies are implicated. The ruling reinforces the idea that public policy serves as an independent legal interest that cannot be waived or restricted by employment contracts.

The Court also clarified that employees are not required to exhaust administrative remedies, such as those provided through the Public Employment Relations Commission (PERC), before filing a public policy-based tort claim in superior court. This separation of tort and administrative remedies ensures that legal recourse is not foreclosed by procedural barriers within the labor system.

Additionally, the Court’s decision limited the scope of First Amendment retaliation claims under § 1983 by reaffirming that only speech involving matters of public concern is constitutionally protected. Since Smith’s grievances involved private employment issues, her petition-clause claim failed. This narrowing preserves the distinction between private workplace disputes and speech on broader civic matters, aligning with federal precedent and reinforcing the public concern requirement in public employee speech cases.
