= Ucam =

UCAM or UCam may refer

- The University of Cambridge, Cambridge, England
- The Catholic University of San Antonio (in Spanish, Universidad Católica San Antonio de Murcia),
- The Universidade Cândido Mendes, Rio de Janeiro, Brazil
- CAM software from Ucamco, Gent, Belgium
