= Calvary Cemetery (Tacoma, Washington) =

Catholic cemetery in Pierce County, Washington

Coordinates: 47°11′31″N 122°30′16″W

- Interactive map of Calvary Cemetery

Details
- Established: October 1905
- Location: Tacoma, Washington
- Type: Catholic cemetery
- Size: 55 acres (22 ha)

Calvary Cemetery is a cemetery located in Tacoma, Washington. It is the only Catholic cemetery in Tacoma. Its size is 55 acres (220,000 m^{2}). Calvary Cemetery was incorporated in October 1905. It was founded because Pioneer Catholic Cemetery was filling up and a new cemetery was needed. Prior to 1905, the cemetery was known as Rigney Cemetery.

Persons of note buried here are Pip Koehler, a baseball player, and Dorothy Olsen, who was a member of the Women Airforce Service Pilots which was established in World War II and LaVerne H. Bates, namesake of Bates Technical College. Also buried here is Ralph Chaplin (1887–1961). Chaplin was an American writer, artist, and labor activist. Chaplin became active in the Industrial Workers of the World (the IWW, or "Wobblies") and may be best known as the author of the labor anthem, "Solidarity Forever". The cemetery contains one British Commonwealth war grave, of a Royal Canadian Air Force officer of World War II.
