= William Green Millsaps =

American politician (1831–1887)

William Green Millsaps (April 2, 1831 – February 25, 1887) was a preacher who served in the Mississippi legislature from 1875 to 1876.

He was born April 2, 1831, around the area of Pleasant Valley, Copiah County, Mississippi, to devout Methodist Episcopal Church members. Reuben Webster Millsaps, founder of Millsaps College, was his brother.

He went to school in Copiah County before going to Hanover College in Indiana to study and then on to Indiana Asbury University (forerunner to DePauw University) graduating in 1853. Although he graduated at the top of the class he did not obtain a first class honors as he had only attended the college for a single year. Two years after graduating he was admitted to the Mississippi Conference and given his first church position in Washington, Mississippi, where he served for two years. It was during this time that he married Fannie Mayberry August 14, 1857. In total he gave twenty six years of service to the Mississippi Conference in different position and locations in Mississippi.

He and his wife sold an acre of land for use by the Mt. Mariah Baptist Church, a "Colored" church in Jefferson County, August 19, 1875.

He was elected to serve in the Mississippi House of Representatives for the 1875–1876 term representing Jefferson County, Mississippi, as a Republican.

The Millsaps-Wilson Library at Millsaps College in Jackson, Mississippi, includes his full library that was donated by his granddaughter Miss Butterfield.

He died February 25, 1887, in Cincinnati, where he was seeking medical treatment.
