= Cândido Mendes de Almeida =

Brazilian lawyer, journalist and politician

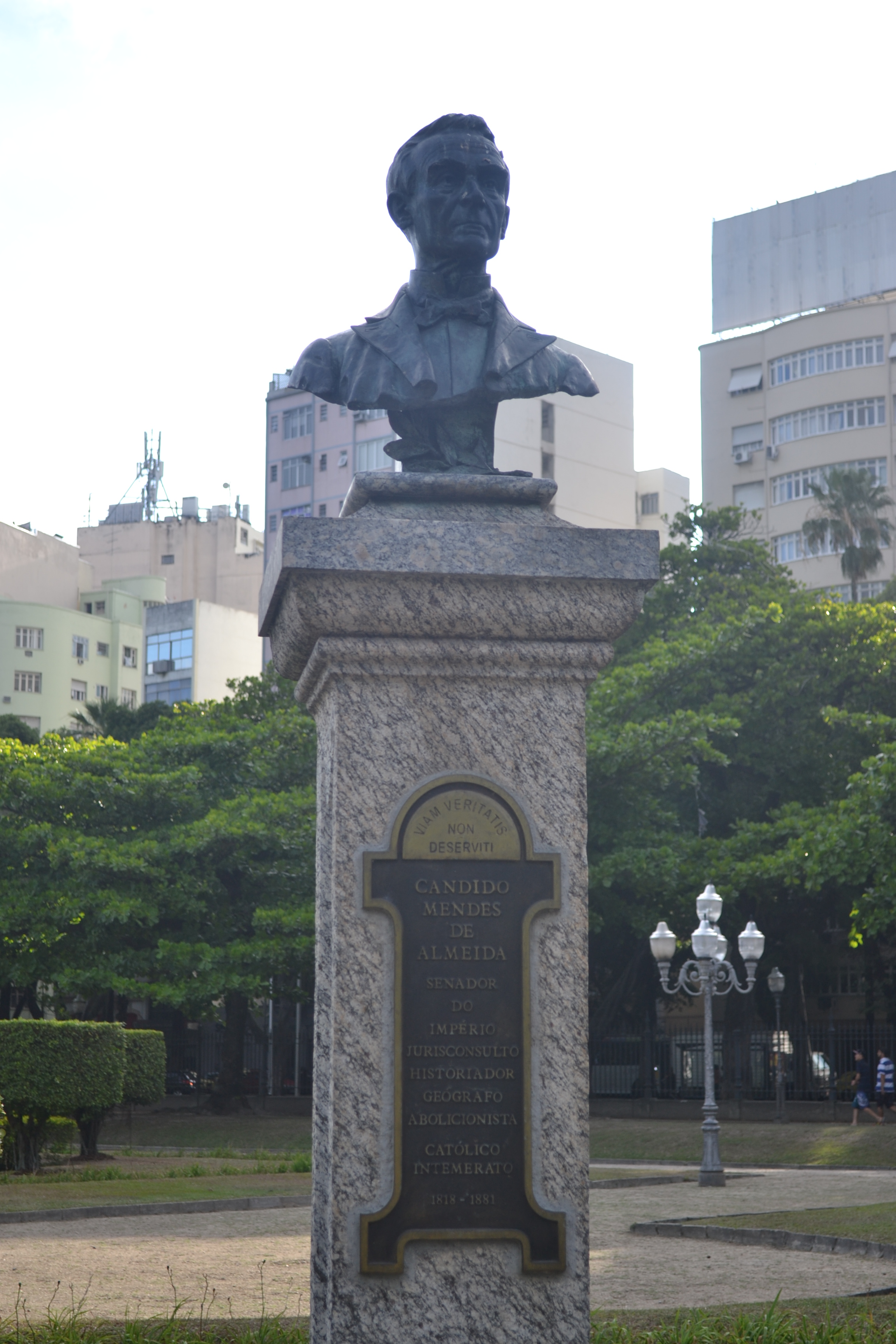
- Cândido Mendes bust

Personal details
- Born: 14 October 1818 Anapurus, Brazil
- Died: 1 March 1881 (aged 62) Rio de Janeiro, Brazil

Cândido Mendes de Almeida (14 October 1818 – 1 March 1881) was a Brazilian lawyer, journalist and politician.

He was representative and senator of the Empire of Brazil (1871–1881). He was decorated with the Order of St. Gregory the Great and the Order of the Rose.

The Universidade Cândido Mendes was named in his honor.

== Works ==
Mendes was author of several works in the fields of Law, History, and Politics:

- As Eleições da Província do Maranhão em 1842 sob a Presidência do Dr. Venâncio José Lisboa (1843);
- Os Serviços relevantes de Manoel Telles da Silva Lobo, na Província do Maranhão (1851);
- A Carolina, ou, a definitiva fixação de limites entre as provincias do Maranhão e de Goyaz (1852);
- Atlas do Império do Brasil (1860)
- Memórias para a história do extincto estado do Maranhão (1860–74), dois volumes;
- S. Luiz e o Pontificado: Estudo Histórico (1869);
- Código Filipino (1870–78) (edição anotada das Ordenações Filipinas com erudita introdução de sua autoria sobre a história do Direito)
- Direito Civil Eclesiástico Brasileiro (reunião de toda legislação canônica ao longo da história do Brasil com introdução de mais de quatrocentas páginas com a história das relações entre o Estado e a Igreja no Brasil)
- Legislação e Jurisprudência no Brasil;
- Direito Mercantil Brasileiro (edição anotada do livro do visconde de Cairu com erudita introdução de mais de oitocentas páginas com a história do comércio marítimo no Brasil).

== Bibliography ==
- Antônio Carlos Villaça. O Senador Cândido Mendes (1981).
