= Sadjad University =

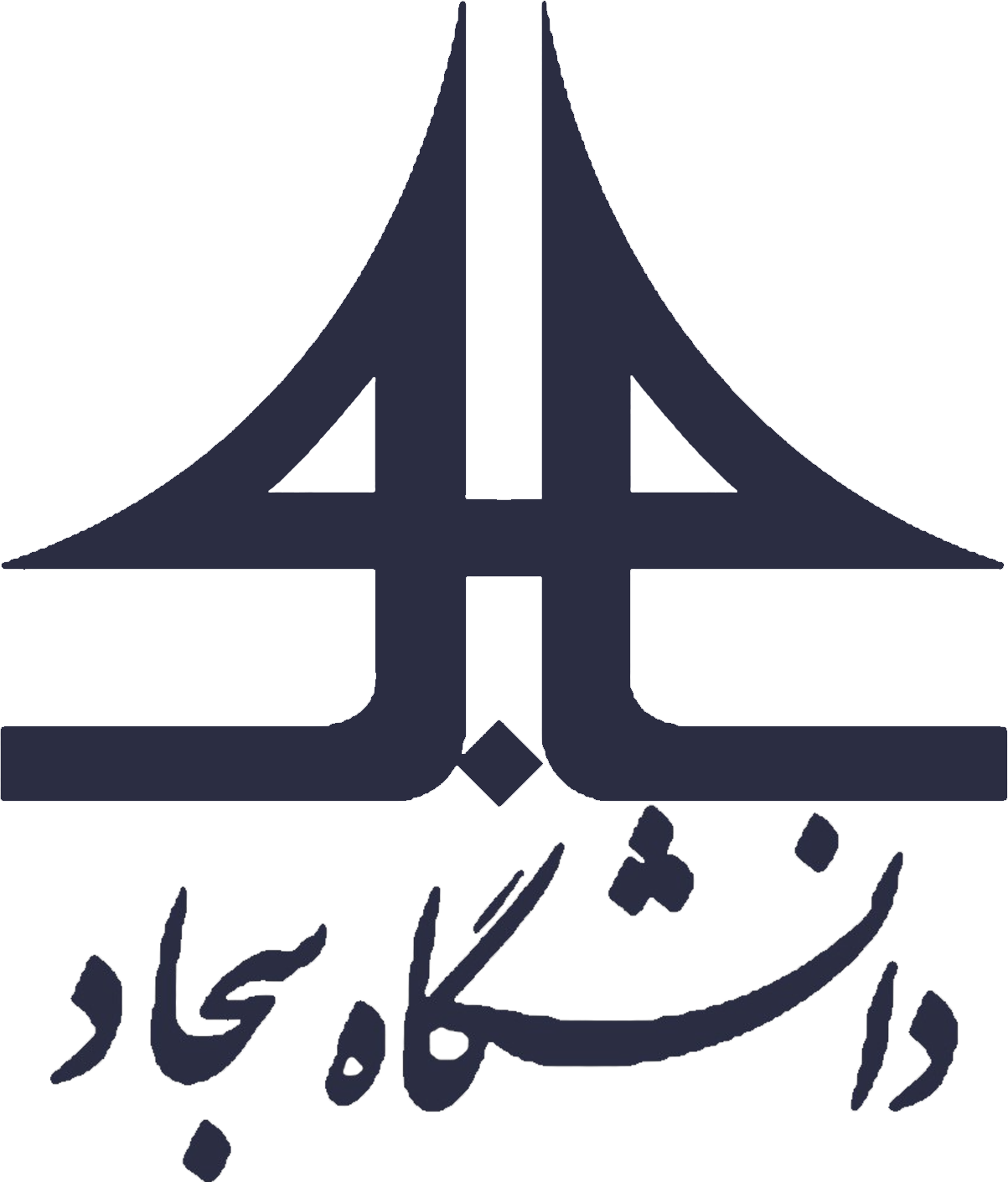
- Motto: Contribute to society through the pursuit of education, learning and research at the highest national levels of excellence
- Type: nonprofit
- Established: 1989 (opened 1995)
- Affiliations: وزارت علوم، تحقیقات و فناوری ایران MSRT
- President: Dr. Ebrahim Rezaei Nik
- Students: 4500
- Undergraduates: 4200
- Postgraduates: 300
- Location: Mashhad, Khorasan Razavi, Iran; 36.3413°N 59.5294°E
- Colors: Blue, black and white
- Nickname: Engineers
- Website: Official website

Sadjad University is a university in Mashhad, Iran. Founded in 1995, Sadjad University started until higher education institution being promoted to an industrial university in 2014. Due to offering of non-engineering majors including industrial management, sport sciences, English teaching, and law, it was promoted to a comprehensive university seven years later in 2020.

Sadjad University has five faculties for 5000 students studying at this university at different levels of PhD (2 programs), master's (21 programs), bachelor’s (14 programs), non-continuous bachelor’s (4 programs), and associate’s (1 program).

Faculties:

• Electrical and Medical Engineering

• Industrial and Mechanical Engineering

• Computer and Information Technology

• Civil Engineering, Architecture, and Urbanism

• Humanities

Sadjad Electronic Knowledge Enterprise

This enterprise has offered a range of products in the field of automatic vehicle locator (AVL). Also, it has offered and commercialized a number of knowledge-based products including:

1. Solar power plant monitoring system (SAMANIR)

2. Intelligent door control system

3. Smart monitoring of road traffic fleet system (SEPAHTAN)

4. Smart integral system of control and monitoring of urban transportation fleet (SEPAD)

5. Mass production of the new product of Sadjad vehicle locator (RadyabS)

Office of Collaboration with Industry

Sadjad University’s office of collaboration with Industry started its activities in 2003.
