= KBTC-TV =

Television station in Tacoma, Washington

KBTC-TV and KCKA

KBTC-TV: Tacoma–Seattle, Washington; KCKA: Centralia, Washington; United States
- Channels for KBTC-TV: Digital: 27 (UHF); Virtual: 28
- Channels for KCKA: Digital: 19 (UHF); Virtual: 15
- Branding: KBTC PBS

Programming
- Affiliations: 28.1/15.1: PBS; 28.2/15.2: NHK World; 28.3/15.3: FNX

Ownership
- Owner: Bates Technical College

History
- First air date: KBTC-TV: September 25, 1961; KCKA: October 2, 1982
- Former call signs: KBTC-TV: KTPS (1961–1979); KTPS-TV (1979–1980); KTPS (1980–1992)
- Former channel number: KBTC-TV: Analog: 62 (UHF, 1961–1982), 28 (UHF, 1982–2009); KCKA: Analog: 15 (UHF, 1982–2009)
- Former affiliations: NET (1961–1970)
- Call sign meaning: KBTC-TV: Bates Technical College; KCKA: Centralia, Kelso and Aberdeen

Technical information
- Licensing authority: FCC
- Facility ID: KBTC-TV: 62469; KCKA: 62468
- ERP: KBTC-TV: 100 kW; 575 kW (CP); KCKA: 187 kW; 353 kW (CP)
- HAAT: KBTC-TV: 220 m (722 ft); 231 m (758 ft) (CP); KCKA: 347 m (1,138 ft)
- Transmitter coordinates: KBTC-TV: 47°16′43.4″N 122°30′46.4″W; KCKA: 46°33′15″N 123°3′30″W
- Translator: see § Translators

Links
- Public license information: KBTC-TV: Public file; LMS; KCKA: Public file; LMS
- Website: www.kbtc.org

KBTC-TV (channel 28) is a television station licensed to Tacoma, Washington, United States, serving the Seattle area as a member of PBS. Owned by Bates Technical College, KBTC-TV maintains studios and transmitter facilities separately in Tacoma, with studios at the Advanced Technology Center (Building B) on the Central/Mohler campus of Bates Technical College on South 19th Street on the city's south side and the transmitter on North 35th Street on the northwest side of the city. KBTC-TV is also broadcast on KCKA (channel 19) in Centralia, serving areas to the south and west of the Tacoma transmitter, and three other translators, one of them in central Seattle.

KBTC-TV is the secondary PBS member for the Seattle–Tacoma market, with Seattle-based KCTS-TV (channel 9) acting as the primary member. Through PBS' Program Differentiation Plan, a policy which addresses multi-station markets, KBTC-TV carries only 25% of the programming broadcast by the network. In addition to reaching a local over-the-air audience, KBTC-TV is available on Comcast Cable in Seattle, Bellevue, Everett, and in many areas of southwestern Washington.

KBTC-TV was established by Tacoma Public Schools as KTPS on UHF channel 62 in 1961. A major facility upgrade in the early 1980s moved the station down the UHF dial to channel 28 and increased its broadcast range by adding a translator station. KTPS became KBTC after Bates Technical College was split from the school system in 1991.

== History ==
Former KBTC logo used from 2001 to 2021.

The station signed on the air September 25, 1961, as KTPS, owned by the Tacoma Public Schools (licensed under the district's official name, "Tacoma School District No. 10"). Broadcasting on channel 62 from studios at the Vocational Technical Institute in Tacoma, the station broadcast with 21,400 watts and provided instructional programming to the schools in the district as well as evening programs from National Educational Television. In 1967, KTPS boosted its power to 337,000 watts, making it the most powerful UHF station in the Northwest, and received money to begin producing local programs in color in 1974. The station, like all NET stations, joined its successor network, PBS upon its start on October 5, 1970.

In 1980, when Kelly Broadcasting settled with a citizens' group to return KCPQ (channel 13) to commercial status, one of the beneficiaries was KTPS. Since Kelly intended to move KCPQ's transmitter to Gold Mountain in Bremerton (thus increasing its signal range), it donated its previous transmitter tower near Ruston to KTPS. The station was also beginning a new quest to move down the dial to a lower channel number than 62 in order to use more signal at less cost. It originally filed for Tacoma's channel 20 but bowed out in a settlement agreement with another applicant, who won the construction permit; that station would eventually become TBN O&O KTBW-TV. The station was instead approved to move to channel 28 from the former KCPQ tower, having bought a UHF transmitter from Nebraska Educational Television; the technical upgrade came just as KTPS's original tower was blown down in a windstorm in February 1982 and the station was operating at severely reduced power in the interim period.

The move from channel 62 to 28 took place in September 1982; shortly after on October 2, the station launched a full-power satellite southward in Centralia, KCKA on channel 15, thus increasing the station's reach in Western Washington. In 1986, the station registered in the Nielsen ratings for the first time in its 25-year history; the next year, an upgraded transmitter expanded the station's signal range again, being receivable now as far north as Everett.

In 1991, the Washington State Legislature split technical colleges like Bates Technical College, where KTPS was housed, from the school districts with which they were affiliated. As a result, KTPS' license was transferred to Bates Technical College, who changed the callsign to KBTC on October 12, 1992. When KSTW announced it would move to a new studio in Renton, it put its old studios in Tacoma up for sale. Bates made a move to purchase the studios to gain additional studio and production space. The legislature approved the financing necessary to make the purchase in March 2000, and KBTC moved in during late 2001. In 2016, Bates converted the facility into a campus, the Central/Mohler Campus, by opening a second building, the Advanced Technology Center.

KBTC-TV and KCKA ended regular programming on their analog signals, over UHF channels 28 and 15, on June 12, 2009, the official date on which full-power television stations in the United States transitioned from analog to digital broadcasts under federal mandate. The stations' digital signals remained on its pre-transition UHF channel 27 (KBTC-TV) and 19 (KCKA), using virtual channels 19 and 15. The FCC allowed KBTC-TV and KCKA to run a DTV nightlight service until July 10, 2009. The DTV nightlight program consisted of an episode of This Old House which provided information regarding the digital television transition, which looped until the analog signal was turned off.

On November 1, 2009, KBTC began broadcasting in 1080i HD on 28.1, with MHz Worldview appearing on subchannel 28.2. A documentary channel was broadcast on 28.3 and Create on 28.4, but was soon removed due to the increased bandwidth required for the HD broadcast on 28.1.

On May 15, 2010, K24IC-D began broadcasting in 1080i HD from Mount Constitution. On December 6, 2010, KBTC added TVW on subchannel 28.3.

On June 19, 2012, KBTC added a low power, 1 kW transmitter on channel 16 to serve Seattle.

On January 28, 2016, KBTC added NHK World on subchannel 28.2. MHz Worldview was shifted to 28.3, and TVW moved to 28.4.

On November 7, 2017, K24IC-D suffered a prolonged transmitter outage due to a hardware failure. The transmitter resumed operation on November 11.

On September 26, 2019, KBTC moved its low-power Seattle translator to channel 28.

With the conversion of MHz Worldview into a subscription-based streaming service, the 28.3 subchannel switched to First Nations Experience on February 28, 2020.

KBTC ceased carrying TVW on July 1, 2025. According to KBTC, TVW had decided to stop contributing to the costs of transmission on KBTC's subchannel.

== Programming ==
As the Seattle market's secondary PBS station, KBTC generally carries network programming on a delay of several days to week, and runs a more non-traditional PBS schedule than KCTS. More traditionally, it runs PBS Kids programming from the late morning into the early evening.

=== Local production ===
KBTC's local production efforts revolve around the weekly public affairs program Northwest Now, which features interviews with newsmakers, election night coverage, and electronic news-gathering pieces shot in the field. In addition to regular Emmy nominations, the program has won several Telly and Society of Professional Journalists Awards.

Full Focus is a half-hour documentary-style show that looks at some of the people, places, and historical events that have helped shape Western Washington. While Full Focus is no longer in regular production, episodes produced by KBTC Managing Editor Tom Layson, Oregon-based producer Forrest Burger, and former KBTC filmmaker Daniel Kopec are available on the station's website.

=== News programming ===
KBTC and Business Examiner produced a local program called the South Sound Business Report. The program first aired on April 20, 2010, on KSTW (channel 11). The SSBR has since ceased production.

== Technical information ==
=== Subchannels ===
The stations' signals are multiplexed:

Subchannels of KBTC-TV and KCKA
Subchannel		Res.	Short name		Programming
KBTC-TV	KCKA	Res.	KBTC-TV	KCKA	Programming
28.1	15.1	1080i	KBTC	KCKA	PBS
28.2	15.2	720p	NHK_WLD		NHK World
28.3	15.3	480i	FNX		FNX

=== Translators ===
- K18NJ-D Bellingham
- K16LV-D Grays River
- KBTC-TV (DRT) 28 Seattle
