= Anapurus =

- Municipality
- Location in Brazil
- Coordinates: 3.67194°S 43.1158°W
- Country: Brazil
- Region: Nordeste
- State: Maranhão
- Mesoregion: Leste Maranhense

Population (2020)
  - Total: 15,894
- Time zone: UTC−3 (BRT)

Anapurus is a municipality in the state of Maranhão in the Northeast region of Brazil.

In February 2012, debris from an Ariane 4 rocket, originally launched in 1997, fell out of orbit and landed in Anapurus.

== See also ==
- List of municipalities in Maranhão
