= Robert Gordon (philanthropist) =

Scottish merchant and philanthropist (1668–1731)

- Born: 1668; Aberdeen
- Died: 1731 (aged 62–63)
- Education: Marischal College, University of Aberdeen

Robert Gordon (1668–1731) was a Scottish merchant and philanthropist. He is most well known for his founding of a charitable hospital which later evolved into a school and then a university in Aberdeen.

== Biography ==
=== Early life ===
Robert Gordon was born in Aberdeen. He was the only son of Arthur Gordon (1625-1680) who married Isabella Menzies of Balgownie. He was baptised in 1688. When Arthur Gordon, a well-respected advocate in the Edinburgh courts, died in 1680, he left his twelve-year-old son the sum of 20,000 merks (about £1,100, equivalent to £210,813 in 2025).

When Gordon reached the age of sixteen he became a Burgess of the City of Aberdeen. Among other benefits, this entitled him to follow a merchant's trade in the town. During the next few years he attended Marischal College, graduating in 1689.

=== Career ===
Soon after graduating, he left Aberdeen, travelling far and wide around Northern Europe before finally settling in Gdańsk (also known as Danzig) where he established himself as a merchant trader. Over the next few decades he built a highly successful business in Gdansk and soon became wealthy. By 1692, he was rich enough to donate a large sum of money to his old college, and by 1699, it appears that he was providing low interest loans to landowners in Aberdeenshire who needed working capital.

Gordon was a loyalist to the early Jacobite cause in Scotland and at times, gave significant financial support to the Stuart court in exile.

=== Return to Aberdeen, death, and legacy ===
Little more is known about his time on the Baltic Sea but by 1720 at the latest, he returned to Aberdeen a very wealthy man. However he had never married and had no heirs. Consequently, he decided that his fortune would be used to found 'a hospital for maintenance, aliment, entertainment and education of young boys' and wrote his will to that effect. He started work on the project in 1730. He died shortly thereafter but the project had started and the funding remained, with £10,300 left to the town council of Aberdeen to administer. Owing to his foresightedness, so work continued on the hospital. His death was recorded as being on 28 April 1731.

Construction of the building was completed in 1743. However, before it could be used for its intended purpose, it was taken over by the Duke of Cumberland to use as a barracks for the Hanoverian troops on his visit to Aberdeen in 1746 to put down the Jacobite rising, and so the hospital did not open until 1750.

During the nineteenth century the hospital developed in two different directions. The first, aimed at secondary education led directly to the modern private school, Robert Gordon's College. The second, aimed at tertiary education, developed in combination with external technical institutes such as Gray's School of Art, into an institution which achieved university status in 1992 as Robert Gordon University.

== Bibliography ==
- Stephen, Leslie; Lee, Sidney, eds. (1890). "Gordon, Robert (1665–1732)" . Dictionary of National Biography. Vol. 22. London: Smith, Elder & Co.
