= Washington C. DePauw =

American businessman and namesake of DePauw University (1822–1887)

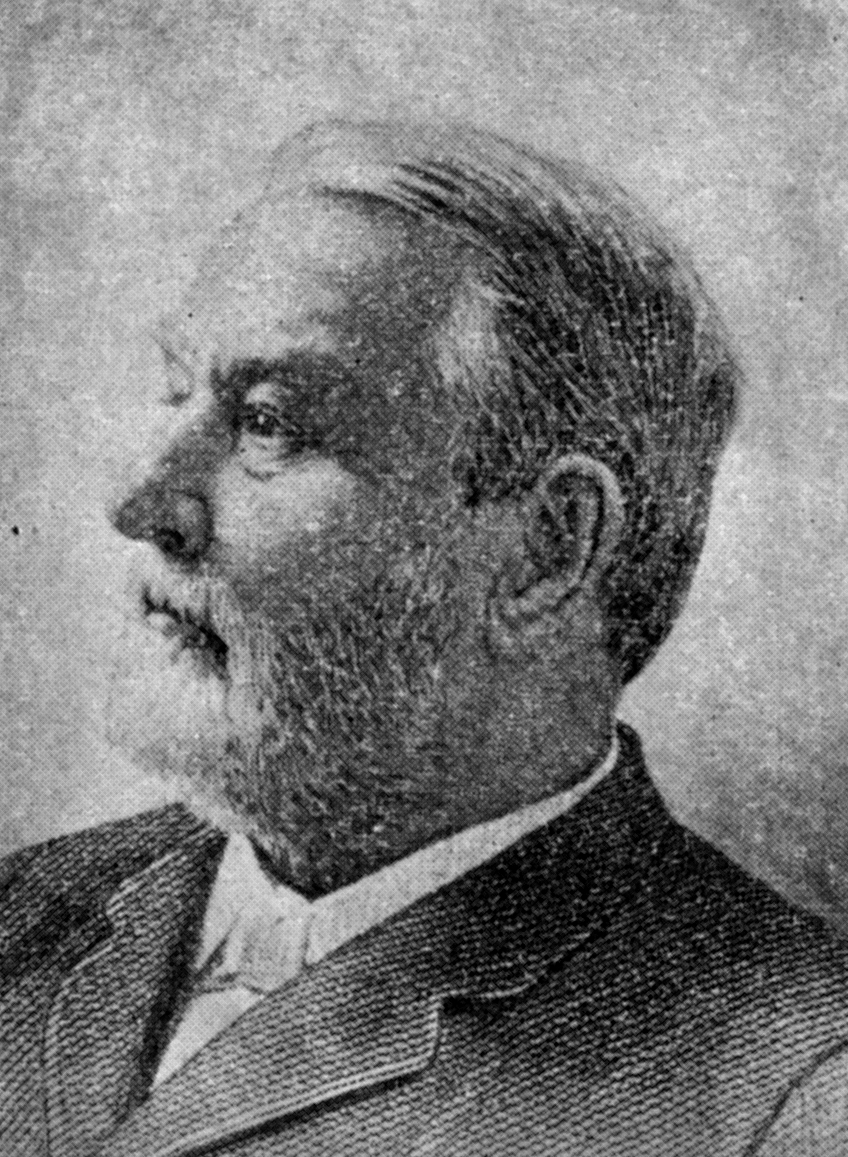
- Washington C. DePauw from Who-When-What Book (1900)
- Born: January 4, 1822
- Died: May 5, 1887 (aged 65)

Washington Charles DePauw (January 4, 1822 – May 5, 1887) was an American businessman and philanthropist. DePauw University in Greencastle, Indiana is named in his honor.

== Early life ==
DePauw was born in Salem, Indiana, and was the grandson of Charles DePauw, who came to the Americas with the Marquis de La Fayette, and the son of John and Elizabeth Battist DePauw. John DePauw had been a lawyer, judge, and a member of the Indiana Constitutional Convention. In 1838, when Washington C. DePauw was just 16, John DePauw was elected for the first of four times to the Indiana legislature. His ancestors, the De Pauw family, came from the city of Ghent in Flanders, Belgium. "De Pauw" is Dutch for "the Peacock".

== Career ==
Throughout his lifetime, Washington amassed a fortune by investing in ventures such as grain, steel and glass, and during the American Civil War, government supplies. At one time, he was considered the wealthiest man in Indiana.

In 1881 he made provisions to establish a Methodist university after his death, which was to be named after him. Upon learning of these provisions, the trustees of Indiana Asbury University, located in Greencastle, Indiana, approached DePauw and asked him to divert his bequest to Indiana Asbury University, which would then take the name DePauw University.

== Family life ==
DePauw was married three times. His first marriage – to Sarah Ellen Fletcher – produced one daughter, Sarah Ellen. He next married Katharine Newland, also of Salem, Indiana, on November 28, 1855. Katharine and Washington had three children: Charles Washington, William, and Newland Talbot. After Kate's death he married Frances Leyden. John Baptiste Ford was W.C. De Pauw's first cousin and one-time business partner.

DePauw died on May 5, 1887, in Chicago, Illinois.
