= Reuben Webster Millsaps =

American lawyer

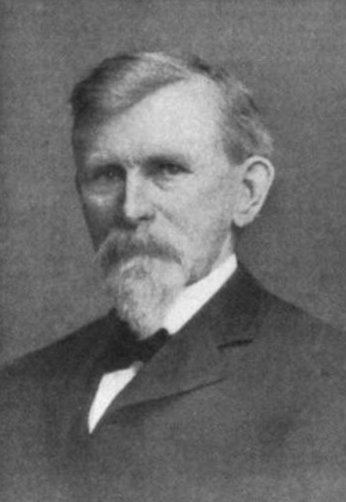
- Born: May 30, 1833; Copiah County, Mississippi
- Died: June 28, 1916 (aged 83); Jackson, Mississippi
- Occupation: Businessman

Reuben Webster Millsaps (May 30, 1833 - June 28, 1916) was an American businessman, financier and philanthropist.

== Early years ==
Millsaps was born on May 30, 1833, into a farming family in Pleasant Valley, Copiah County, Mississippi, one of nine siblings. He was of English, Scots-Irish, and Welsh descent. William Green Millsaps was his brother.

Reuben Millsaps attended Indiana Asbury College, now known as DePauw University, and Harvard University Law School, where he earned a law degree.

== Civil War ==
He fought in the American Civil War as a soldier in the Confederate States Army and was wounded twice during the war. He attained the military rank of Major.

== Postbellum career ==
After returning from the war he pursued a successful career in business and finance. He was President of Capital State Bank in Jackson, Mississippi.

== Philanthropy ==
In 1890, Millsaps donated US$550,000, which was matched by contributions from Mississippi's Methodist community, for the creation of "a Christian college within the borders of our state". The college is now known as Millsaps College and is located in Jackson, Mississippi. He devoted the rest of his life to the building and running of the college.

== Death ==
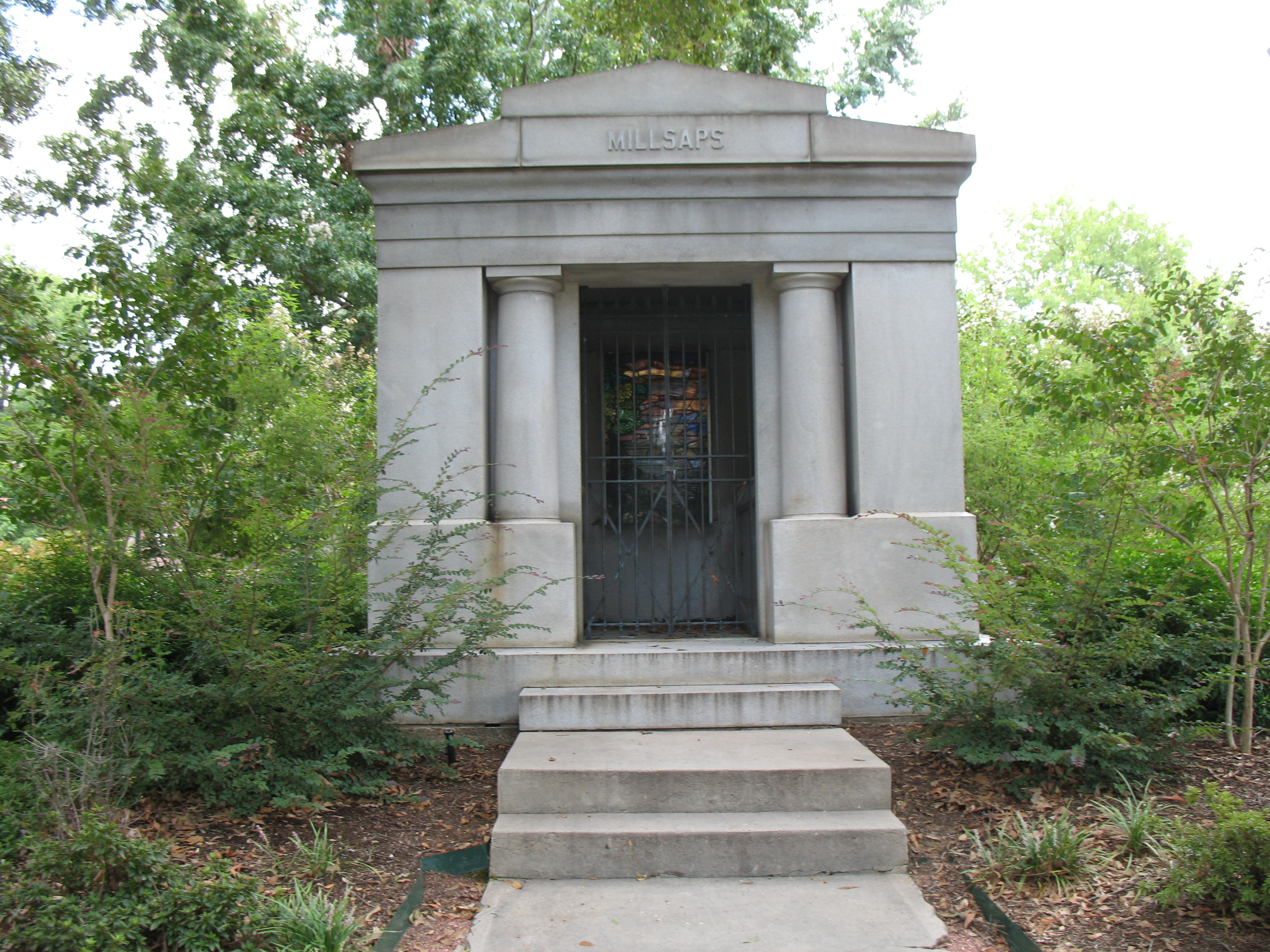
Tomb on the campus of Millsaps College

He died at his home in Jackson on June 28, 1916, at the age of 83. He was buried on the campus of Millsaps College in Jackson.
