= LaVerne H. Bates =

LaVerne H. Bates (also known as Verne Bates or L.H. Bates) (1904-1982) was an educator, printer, public official and the early director and namesake of Bates Technical College in Tacoma, Washington.

LaVerne Hazen Bates was born on May 9, 1904, in Washington as the eldest child of Olive S. Chesley (Bates) and Beverly Bates, a teamster originally from Minnesota. Bates attended public schools in Spokane, Washington. In 1924, he began working as a printer in Spokane's trade school. By at least 1934, he was serving as a printer's assistant at North Central High School in Spokane, and in 1937, LaVerne Bates was appointed as an instructor of printing in both the trade school and high school, becoming active in the National Youth Administration. In 1944, LaVerne Hazen Bates (L. H. Bates) became the director of the Tacoma Vocational School, which was renamed as the Tacoma Vocational-Technical Institute in 1947. In 1951, Governor Arthur Langlie appointed Bates to be employment security commissioner and in 1955, Bates was appointed director of the department of labor and industries. After L. H. Bates retired as a director of the Tacoma Vocational-Technical Institute in 1969, the Tacoma School Board changed the school's name to the "L. H. Bates Vocational Technical Institute." Bates was residing in Tacoma when he died in 1982 and was buried in the Calvary Cemetery in Tacoma.
