= Eugene Russell Hendrix =

American Methodist bishop (1847–1927)

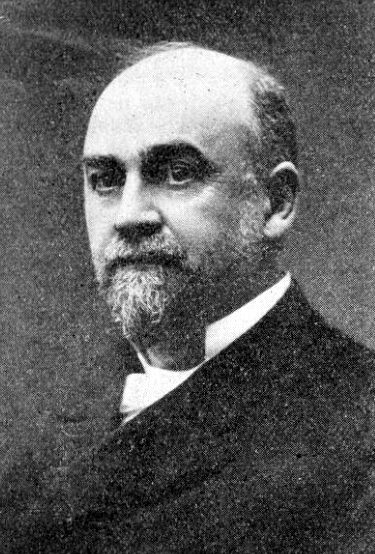
- Born: May 17, 1847; Fayette, Missouri
- Died: November 11, 1927 (aged 80); Kansas City, Missouri
- Burial place: Mount Washington Cemetery
- Education: Wesleyan University; Union Theological Seminary
- Occupation: Clergyman
- Spouse: Ann Elizabeth Scarritt (m. 1872)

Eugene Russell Hendrix (May 17, 1847 – November 11, 1927) was a bishop of the Methodist Episcopal Church, South in the U.S., elected in 1886.

== Biography ==
Eugene Russell Hendrix was born in Fayette, Missouri on May 17, 1847. He graduated from Wesleyan University in 1867, and from Union Theological Seminary in 1869.

He died at his home in Kansas City, Missouri on November 11, 1927, and was buried at Mount Washington Cemetery in Independence.

Hendrix College in Conway, Arkansas, is named in his honor.

== Family ==
He was married to Ann Elizabeth Scarritt (born May 23, 1851), daughter of Nathan Spencer Scarritt (1821–1890) and Martha Matilda Chick (died 1873), on June 20, 1872.

== See also ==
- List of bishops of the United Methodist Church
