= Bates Technical College =

Public technical college in Tacoma, Washington, U.S.

Coordinates: 47°15′06″N 122°26′47″W

- Type: Public Technical College
- Established: 1940
- Accreditation: Northwest Commission on Colleges and Universities
- President: Lin Zhou
- Location: Tacoma, Washington, United States
- Campus: Urban
- Mascot: Brutus the Bobcat
- Website: www.batestech.edu

Bates Technical College is a public technical college in Tacoma, Washington. The college offers Associate of Applied Science degrees, academic certificates, and industry certifications. Bates is accredited by the Northwest Commission on Colleges and Universities.

Bates operates three campuses in Tacoma, occupying a total of approximately 650,000 square feet (60,000 m^{2}) of classrooms, shops, meeting rooms, and offices.

== History ==
In 1940, a technical education program was founded in the basement of Hawthorne Elementary School. During the 1941–42 school year, the program was officially named the Tacoma Vocational School. In 1944, LaVerne Hazen Bates (L. H. Bates) became the school's director. In 1947, the school changed its name to the Tacoma Vocational-Technical Institute. After L. H. Bates retired in 1969, the Tacoma School Board changed the school's name to the "L. H. Bates Vocational Technical Institute." In 1991, the state separated the state's vocational technical institutes from the local school districts and they came under the auspices of the State Board for Community and Technical Colleges. In 1992, the college took over ownership of Tacoma-based PBS member station KTPS-TV from the Tacoma School District, subsequently changing the station's callsign to KBTC-TV on October 12.

== Enrollment and academics ==
Classes at Bates run from September to August with quarter-based academic and enrollment calendar. Weekly information sessions are held to help students select and develop an area of interest.

Classroom settings are similar to the workplace in a related field, and students are evaluated as they would be at a business. The college claims to works closely with industries pertaining to career education areas to improve their curriculum. The college offers workforce education, continuing education, child studies programs, and apprenticeship training.

Students can earn an Associate of Applied Science degree, Associate of Applied Science-Transfer degree, Certificate of Competency, or a Certificate of Training. Classes are also offered in basic studies, ESL and GED preparation. A technical high school and a Running Start program are available to students 16–20 years of age who have not yet earned a high school diploma. High School+ is offered to adults who seek a high school diploma. High school students who follow an associate degree path as part of their career program may receive their high school diploma without any further high school requirements, including state assessments. Worker retraining funds provide unemployed and laid-off workers with immediate access to training at Bates.

Bates organizes its academic programs into career pathways. These pathways include:

- College & Career Preparation
- Advanced Manufacturing
- Business and Communication
- Hospitality
- Education and Public Safety
- Health Sciences
- Science, Technology, Engineering and Math (STEM)
- Transportation and Trades
- Continuing Education
- Apprenticeships
- High School
- Child Studies

== Community relations ==
Bates has been a part of the Puget Sound community for nearly 80 years. The college has partnerships with businesses and industry organizations, both locally and internationally The student body and employees are involved in public events, hosted at Bates and throughout the community, including an annual Veterans Day Celebration, the Martin Luther King, Jr. Celebration, and a Disability Awareness Day.

== Rankings ==
In 2018, Forbes ranked Bates in the top 20 two-year trade schools.

Bates was ranked as the best school for HVAC Training by Servgrow .
