= Universidade Candido Mendes =

Private university in Brazil

Candido Mendes University
- Universidade Candido Mendes
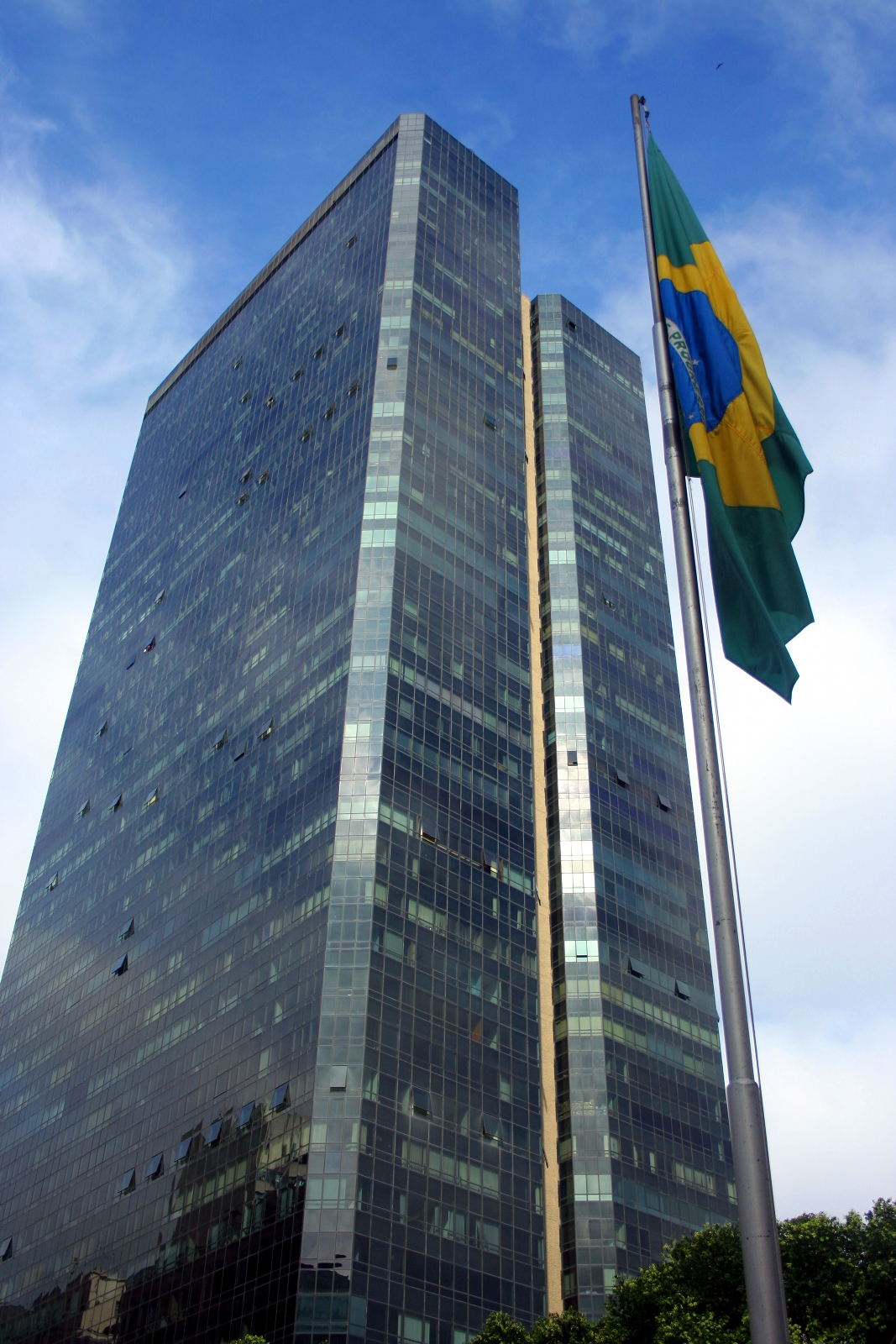
- Type: Private
- Established: 1902
- Location: Rio de Janeiro, Brazil

Universidade Candido Mendes is a private university located in Rio de Janeiro, Brazil. It is Latin America's oldest private university.

== History ==
It was founded in 1902, thus being the oldest private university in Latin America, by the Count Cândido Mendes de Almeida. The university was renamed to Escola Técnica de Comércio Cândido Mendes in the 1950s. The law school was created by Cândido Mendes de Almeida Júnior during that decade. The university's research institute, named IUPERJ, or Instituto Universitário de Pesquisas do Rio de Janeiro, was inaugurated in the 1960s. The campi located in Ipanema, Campos dos Goytacazes and Nova Friburgo were inaugurated in the 1970s.

== Notable alumni ==
- Flávio Bolsonaro, senator of Rio de Janeiro
