= List of bishops of the United Methodist Church =

This is a list of bishops of the United Methodist Church and its predecessor denominations, in order of their election to the episcopacy, both living and dead.

== 1784–1807 ==
Founders

- Thomas Coke 1784
- Francis Asbury 1784
- Richard Whatcoat 1800
- Philip William Otterbein 1800
- Martin Boehm 1800
- Jacob Albright 1807

== 1808–1825 ==
- William McKendree 1808
- Christian Newcomer 1813
- Enoch George 1816
- Robert Richford Roberts 1816
- Andrew Zeller 1817
- Joseph Hoffman 1821
- Joshua Soule 1824
- Elijah Hedding 1824
- Henry Kumler Sr 1825

== 1826–1850 ==
- John Emory 1832
- James Osgood Andrew 1832
- Samuel Heistand 1833
- William Brown 1833
- Beverly Waugh 1836
- Thomas Asbury Morris 1836
- Jacob Erb 1837
- John Seybert 1839
- Henry Kumler Jr 1841
- John Coons 1841
- Joseph Long 1843
- Leonidas Lent Hamline 1844
- Edmund Storer Janes 1844
- John Russel 1845
- Jacob John Glossbrenner 1845
- William Hanby 1845
- William Capers 1846
- Robert Paine 1846
- David Edwards 1849
- Henry Bidleman Bascom 1850

== 1851–1875 ==
- Levi Scott 1852
- Matthew Simpson 1852
- Osman Cleander Baker 1852
- Edward Raymond Ames 1852
- Lewis Davis 1853
- George Foster Pierce 1854
- John Early 1854
- Hubbard Hinde Kavanaugh 1854
- Francis Burns 1858
- William Wagner Orwig 1859
- Jacob Markwood 1861
- Daniel Shuck 1861
- John Jacob Esher 1863
- Davis Wasgatt Clark 1864
- Edward Thomson 1864
- Calvin Kingsley 1864
- Jonathan Weaver 1865
- William May Wightman 1866
- Enoch Mather Marvin 1866
- David Seth Doggett 1866
- Holland Nimmons McTyeire 1866
- John Wright Roberts 1866
- John Dickson 1869
- John Christian Keener 1870
- Reuben Yeakel 1871
- Thomas Bowman 1872
- William Logan Harris 1872
- Randolph Sinks Foster 1872
- Isaac William Wiley 1872
- Stephen Mason Merrill 1872
- Edward Gayer Andrews 1872
- Gilbert Haven 1872
- Jesse Truesdell Peck 1872
- Rudolph Dubs 1875
- Thomas Bowman 1875

== 1876–1900 ==
- Milton Wright 1877
- Nicholas Castle 1877
- Beniah John Willis 1877
- Henry White Warren 1880
- Cyrus David Foss 1880
- John Fletcher Hurst 1880
- Erastus Otis Haven 1880
- Ezekiel Boring Kephart 1881
- Alpheus Waters Wilson 1882
- Linus Parker 1882
- John Cowper Granbery 1882
- Robert Kennon Hargrove 1882
- William Xavier Ninde 1884
- John Morgan Walden 1884
- Willard Francis Mallalieu 1884
- Charles Henry Fowler 1884
- William Taylor 1884
- Daniel Kumler Flickinger 1885
- William Wallace Duncan 1886
- Charles Betts Galloway 1886
- Eugene Russell Hendrix 1886
- Joseph Stanton Key 1886
- John Heyl Vincent 1888
- James Newbury FitzGerald 1888
- Isaac Wilson Joyce 1888
- John Philip Newman 1888
- Daniel Ayres Goodsell 1888
- James Mills Thoburn 1888
- James W. Hott 1889
- Atticus Greene Haygood 1890
- Oscar Penn Fitzgerald 1890
- Wesley Matthias Stanford 1891
- Christian S. Haman 1891
- Sylvanus C. Breyfogel 1891
- William Horn 1891
- Job S. Mills 1893
- Charles Cardwell McCabe 1896
- Joseph Crane Hartzell 1896
- Earl Cranston 1896
- Warren Akin Candler 1898
- Henry Clay Morrison 1898
- David Hastings Moore 1900
- John William Hamilton 1900
- Edwin Wallace Parker 1900
- Francis Wesley Warne 1900

== 1901–1912 ==
- George Martin Mathews 1902
- Alexander Coke Smith 1902
- Elijah Embree Hoss 1902
- Henry Burns Hartzler 1902
- William Franklin Heil 1902
- Joseph Flintoft Berry 1904
- Henry Spellmeyer 1904
- William Fraser McDowell 1904
- James Whitford Bashford 1904
- William Burt 1904
- Luther Barton Wilson 1904
- Thomas Benjamin Neely 1904
- Isaiah Benjamin Scott 1904
- William Fitzjames Oldham 1904
- John Edward Robinson 1904
- Merriman Colbert Harris 1904
- William Marion Weekley 1905
- William Mayes Willis 1905
- William Melvin Bell 1905
- Thomas Coke Carter 1905
- John James Tigert III 1906
- Seth Ward 1906
- James Atkins 1906
- Samuel P. Spreng 1907
- William Franklin Anderson 1908
- John Louis Nuelsen 1908
- William Alfred Quayle 1908
- Charles William Smith 1908
- Wilson Seeley Lewis 1908
- Edwin Holt Hughes 1908
- Robert McIntyre 1908
- Frank Milton Bristol 1908
- Collins Denny 1910
- John Carlisle Kilgo 1910
- William Belton Murrah 1910
- Walter Russell Lambuth 1910
- Richard Green Waterhouse 1910
- Edwin DuBose Mouzon 1910
- James Henry McCoy 1910
- William Hargrave Fouke 1910
- Uriah Frantz Swengel 1910
- Homer Clyde Stuntz 1912
- William Orville Shepard 1912
- Theodore Sommers Henderson 1912
- Naphtali Luccock 1912
- Francis John McConnell 1912
- Frederick DeLand Leete 1912
- Richard Joseph Cooke 1912
- Wilbur Patterson Thirkield 1912
- John Wesley Robinson 1912
- William Perry Eveland 1912

== 1913–1925 ==
- Henry Harness Fout 1913
- Cyrus Jeffries Kephart 1913
- Alfred Taylor Howard 1913
- Gottlieb Heinmiller 1915
- Lawrence Hoover Seager 1915
- Herbert George Welch 1916
- Thomas Nicholson 1916
- Adna Wright Leonard 1916
- Matthew Simpson Hughes 1916
- Charles Bayard Mitchell 1916
- Franklin Elmer Ellsworth Hamilton 1916
- Alexander Priestly Camphor 1916
- Eben Samuel Johnson 1916
- William H. Washinger 1917
- John Moore 1918
- William Fletcher McMurry 1918
- Urban Valentine Williams Darlington 1918
- Horace Mellard DuBose 1918
- William Newman Ainsworth 1918
- James Cannon Jr 1918
- Matthew T. Maze 1918
- Lauress John Birney 1920
- Frederick Bohn Fisher 1920
- Charles Edward Locke 1920
- Ernest Lynn Waldorf 1920
- Edgar Blake 1920
- Ernest Gladstone Richardson 1920
- Charles Wesley Burns 1920
- Harry Lester Smith 1920
- George Harvey Bickley 1920
- Frederick Thomas Keeney 1920
- Charles Larew Mead 1920
- Anton Bast 1920
- Robert Elijah Jones 1920
- Matthew Wesley Clair 1920
- Arthur R. Clippinger 1921
- William Benjamin Beauchamp 1922
- James Edward Dickey 1922
- Samuel Ross Hay 1922
- Hoyt McWhorter Dobbs 1922
- Hiram Abiff Boaz 1922
- John Francis Dunlap 1922
- George Amos Miller 1924
- Titus Lowe 1924
- George Richmond Grose 1924
- Brenton Thoburn Badley 1924
- Wallace Elias Brown 1924
- Arthur Biggs Statton 1925

== 1926–1938 ==
- John S. Stamm 1926
- Samuel J. Umbreit 1926
- Raymond J. Wade 1928
- James Chamberlain Baker 1928
- Edwin Ferdinand Lee 1928
- Grant D. Batdorf 1929
- Ira David Warner 1929
- John W. Gowdy 1930
- Chih Ping Wang 1930
- Arthur James Moore 1930
- Paul Bentley Kern 1930
- Angie Frank Smith 1930
- George Edward Epp 1930
- Jashwant Rao Chitambar 1931
- Juan Ermete Gattinoni 1932
- Junius Ralph Magee 1932
- Ralph Spaulding Cushman 1932
- Elmer Wesley Praetorius 1934
- Charles H. Stauffacher 1934
- Jarrell Waskom Pickett 1935
- Roberto Valenzuela Elphick 1936
- Wilbur Emery Hammaker 1936
- Charles Wesley Flint 1936
- Garfield Bromley Oxnam 1936
- Alexander Preston Shaw 1936
- John McKendree Springer 1936
- F. H. Otto Melle 1936
- Ralph Ansel Ward 1937
- Victor Otterbein Weidler 1938
- Ivan Lee Holt 1938
- William Walter Peele 1938
- Clare Purcell 1938
- Charles Claude Selecman 1938
- John Lloyd Decell 1938
- William Clyde Martin 1938
- William Turner Watkins 1938

== 1939–1950 ==
- James Henry Straughn 1939
- John Calvin Broomfield 1939
- William Alfred Carroll Hughes 1940
- Lorenzo Houston King 1940
- Bruce Richard Baxter 1940
- Shot Kumar Mondol 1940
- Clement Daniel Rockey 1941
- Enrique Carlos Balloch 1941
- Z. T. Kaung 1941
- Wen Yuan Chen 1941
- George Carleton Lacy 1941
- Fred Lewis Dennis 1941
- Dionisio Deista Alejandro 1944
- Fred Pierce Corson 1944
- Walter Earl Ledden 1944
- Lewis Oliver Hartman 1944
- Newell Snow Booth 1944
- Willis Jefferson King 1944
- Robert Nathaniel Brooks 1944
- Edward Wendall Kelly 1944
- William Angie Smith 1944
- Paul Elliott Martin 1944
- Costen Jordan Harrell 1944
- Paul Neff Garber 1944
- Charles Wesley Brashares 1944
- Schuyler Edward Garth 1944
- Arthur Frederick Wesley 1944
- John Abdus Subhan 1945
- John Balmer Showers 1945
- Theodor Arvidson 1946
- Johann Wilhelm Ernst Sommer 1946
- John Wesley Edward Bowen 1948
- Lloyd Christ Wicke 1948
- John Wesley Lord 1948
- Dana Dawson 1948
- Marvin Augustus Franklin 1948
- Roy Hunter Short 1948
- Richard Campbell Raines 1948
- Marshall Russell Reed 1948
- Harry Clifford Northcott 1948
- Hazen Graff Werner 1948
- Glenn Randall Phillips 1948
- Gerald Hamilton Kennedy 1948
- Donald Harvey Tippett 1948
- Jose Labarrete Valencia 1948
- Sante Uberto Barbieri 1949
- Raymond LeRoy Archer 1950
- David Thomas Gregory 1950

== 1951–1963 ==
- Frederick Buckley Newell 1952
- Edgar Amos Love 1952
- Matthew Wesley Clair Jr. 1952
- John Warren Branscomb 1952
- Henry Bascom Watts 1952
- D. Stanley Coors 1952
- Edwin Edgar Voigt 1952
- Francis Gerald Ensley 1952
- Alsie Raymond Grant 1952
- Julio Manuel Sabanes 1952
- Friedrich Wunderlich 1953
- Odd Arthur Hagen 1953
- Ferdinand Sigg 1954
- Reuben Herbert Mueller 1954
- Harold Rickel Heininger 1954
- Lyle Lynden Baughman 1954
- Prince Albert Taylor Jr. 1956
- Eugene Maxwell Frank 1956
- Nolan Bailey Harmon 1956
- Bachman Gladstone Hodge 1956
- Hobart Baumann Amstutz 1956
- Ralph Edward Dodge 1956
- Mangal Singh 1956
- Gabriel Sundaram 1956
- Paul Eugene Virgil Shannon 1957
- John Gordon Howard 1957
- Hermann Walter Kaebnickv 1958
- W. Maynard Sparks 1958
- Paul Murray Herrick 1958
- Bowman Foster Stockwell 1960
- Fred Garrigus Holloway 1960
- William Vernon Middleton 1960
- W. Ralph Ward 1960
- James Kenneth Mathews 1960
- Oliver Eugene Slater 1960
- William Kenneth Pope 1960
- Paul Vernon Galloway 1960
- Aubrey Grey Walton 1960
- Kenneth Wilford Copeland 1960
- Everett Walter Palmer 1960
- Ralph Taylor Alton 1960
- Edwin Ronald Garrison 1960
- Torney Otto Nall Jr. 1960
- Charles Franklin Golden 1960
- Noah Watson Moore Jr. 1960
- Marquis LaFayette Harris 1960
- James Walton Henley 1960
- Walter Clark Gum 1960
- Paul Hardin Jr. 1960
- John Owen Smith 1960
- Paul William Milhouse 1960
- Pedro Ricardo Zottele 1962

== 1964–1975 ==
- James Samuel Thomas 1964
- William McFerrin Stowe 1964
- Walter Kenneth Goodson 1964
- Dwight Ellsworth Loder 1964
- Robert Marvin Stuart 1964
- Edward Julian Pendergrass Jr 1964
- Thomas Marion Pryor 1964
- Homer Ellis Finger Jr 1964
- Earl Gladstone Hunt Jr 1964
- Francis Enmer Kearns 1964
- Lance Webb 1964
- Escrivao Anglaze Zunguze 1964
- Robert Fielden Lundy 1964
- Harry Peter Andreassen 1964
- John Wesley Shungu 1964
- Alfred Jacob Shaw 1965
- Prabhakar Christopher Benjamin Balaram 1965
- Stephen Trowen Nagbe 1965
- Franz Werner Schäfer 1966
- Benjamin I. Guansing 1967
- Lineunt Scott Allen 1967
- Paul Arthur Washburn 1968
- Carl Ernst Sommer 1968
- David Frederick Wertz 1968
- Alsie Henry Carleton 1968
- Roy Calvin Nichols 1968
- Arthur James Armstrong 1968 (resigned 1983)
- William Ragsdale Cannon 1968
- Abel Tendekayi Muzorewa 1968
- Cornelio M. Ferrer 1968
- Paul Locke A. Granadosin 1968
- Joseph R. Lance 1968
- Ram Dutt Joshi 1968
- Eric Algernon Mitchell 1969
- Federico Jose Pagura 1969
- Armin E. Haertel 1970
- Ole Edvard Borgen 1970
- Finis Alonzo Crutchfield, Jr. 1972
- Joseph Hughes Yeakel 1972
- Robert E. Goodrich Jr 1972
- Carl Julian Sanders 1972
- Ernest T. Dixon Jr 1972
- Don Wendell Holter 1972
- Wayne K. Clymer 1972
- Joel David McDavid 1972
- Edward Gonzalez Carroll 1972
- Jesse Robert DeWitt 1972
- James Mase Ault 1972
- John B. Warman 1972
- Mack B. Stokes 1972
- Jack Tuell 1972
- Melvin E. Wheatley Jr 1972
- Edward Lewis Tullis 1972
- Frank Lewis Robertson 1972
- Wilbur Wong Yan Choy 1972
- Robert McGrady Blackburn 1972
- Emilio J. M. de Carvalho 1972
- Fama Onema 1972 Bishop Joseph Fama Onema is a retired Congolese Bishop of United Methodist Church, elected to that office in 1972.
- Mamidi Elia Peter 1972
- Bennie de Quency Warner 1973

== 1976–1988 ==
- J. Kenneth Shamblin 1976
- Alonzo Monk Bryan 1976
- Kenneth William Hicks 1976
- James Chess Lovern 1976
- Leroy Charles Hodapp 1976
- Edsel Albert Ammons 1976
- C. Dale White 1976
- Ngoy Kimba Wakadilo 1976
- Almeida Penicela 1976
- LaVerne D. Mercado 1976
- Hermann Ludwig Sticher 1977
- Shantu Kumar A. Parmar 1979
- Thomas Syla Bangura 1979
- John Alfred Ndoricimpa 1980
- William Talbot Handy Jr. 1980
- John Wesley Hardt 1980
- Benjamin Ray Oliphint 1980
- Louis Wesley Schowengerdt 1980
- Melvin George Talbert 1980
- Paul Andrews Duffey 1980
- Edwin Charles Boulton 1980
- John William Russell 1980
- Fitz Herbert Skeete 1980
- George Willis Bashore 1980
- Roy Clyde Clark 1980
- William Boyd Grove 1980
- Emerson Stephen Colaw 1980
- Marjorie Matthews 1980
- Carlton Printess Minnick Jr 1980
- Calvin Dale McConnell 1980
- Kainda Katembo 1980
- Emerito P. Nacpil 1980
- Arthur Flumo Kulah 1980
- Late Bishop Dr. Karriappa Samuel is first Bishop of Methodist Church in India 1981
- Felton Edwin May 1984
- Ernest A. Fitzgerald 1984
- R. Kern Eutsler 1984
- J. Woodrow Hearn 1984
- Walter L. Underwood 1984
- Richard B. Wilke 1984
- J. Lloyd Knox 1984
- Neil L. Irons 1984
- Roy I. Sano 1984
- Lewis Bevel Jones III 1984
- Forrest C. Stith 1984
- Ernest W. Newman 1984
- Woodie W. White 1984
- Robert Crawley Morgan 1984
- David J. Lawson 1984
- Elias Gabriel Galvan 1984
- Rueben Philip Job 1984
- Leontine T. Kelly 1984
- Judith Craig 1984
- Rüdiger Rainer Minor 1986
- Eugenio Poma Anaguña 1986
- Jose Castro Gamboa Jr 1986
- Thomas Barber Stockton 1988
- Harold Hasbrouck Hughes Jr 1988
- Richard Carl Looney 1988
- Robert Hitchcock Spain 1988
- Susan Murch Morrison 1988
- R. Sheldon Duecker 1988
- Joseph Benjamin Bethea 1988
- William B. Oden 1988
- Bruce P. Blake 1988
- Charles Wilbourne Hancock 1988
- Clay Foster Lee Jr 1988
- Sharon A. Brown Christopher 1988
- Dan E. Solomon 1988
- William B. Lewis 1988
- William W. Dew Jr 1988
- Moises Domingos Fernandes 1988
- Joao Somane Machado 1988

== 1989–2000 ==
- Walter Klaiber 1989
- Heinrich Bolleter 1989
- Hans Vaxby 1989
- Alfred Lloyd Norris 1992
- Joe Allen Wilson 1992
- Robert Eugene Fannin 1992
- Amelia Ann B. Sherer 1992
- Albert Frederick Mutti 1992
- Raymond Harold Owen 1992
- Joel Nestali Martinez 1992
- Donald Arthur Ott 1992
- Kenneth Lee Carder 1992
- Hae Jong Kim 1992 (resigned 2005)
- William Wesley Morris 1992
- Marshall Leroy Meadors Jr 1992
- Charles Wesley Jordan 1992
- Sharon Zimmerman Rader 1992
- S. Clifton Ives 1992
- Mary Ann Swenson 1992
- Done Peter Dabale 1992
- Joseph Christian Humper 1992
- Christopher Jokomo 1992
- Daniel C. Arichea Jr 1994
- G. Lindsey Davis 1996
- Joseph E. Pennel Jr 1996
- Charlene P. Kammerer 1996
- Alfred Johnson 1996
- Cornelius L. Henderson 1996
- Susan Wolfe Hassinger 1996
- J. Lawrence McCleskey 1996
- Ernest S. Lyght 1996
- Janice Riggle Huie 1996
- Marion M. Edwards 1996
- C. Joseph Sprague 1996
- Peter D. Weaver 1996
- Jonathan D. Keaton 1996
- Ray Chamberlain 1996
- John L. Hopkins 1996
- Michael J. Coyner 1996
- Edward W. Paup 1996 (resigned 2008 to accept General Secretariat of Board of Global Missions)
- Ntambo Nkulu Ntanda 1996
- Larry M. Goodpaster 2000
- Rhymes H. Moncure Jr 2000
- Beverly J. Shamana 2000
- Violet L. Fisher 2000
- Gregory V. Palmer 2000
- William W. Hutchinson 2000
- B. Michael Watson 2000
- D. Max Whitfield 2000
- Benjamin Roy Chamness 2000
- Linda Lee 2000
- James R. King 2000
- Bruce R. Ough 2000
- Warner H. Brown Jr 2000
- José Quipungo 2000
- Gaspar Joao Domingos 2000
- Leo A. Soriano 2000
- Benjamin A. Justo 2000
- John G. Innis 2000
- Carlos Intipampa 2000

== 2001–2007 ==
- Timothy W. Whitaker 2001
- Øystein Olsen 2001
- Solito K. Toquero 2001
- Nélida (Nelly) Ritchie 2001
- Marcus Matthews 2004
- Sudarshana Devadhar 2004
- Jeremiah J. Park 2004
- Hope Morgan Ward 2004
- William H. Willimon 2004
- James E. Swanson Sr 2004
- Hee-soo Jung 2004
- Robert E. Hayes Jr 2004
- Alfred W. Gwinn Jr 2004
- John R. Schol 2004
- Richard J. Wills Jr 2004
- Robert C. Schnase 2004
- Deborah L. Kiesey 2004
- Jane Allen Middleton 2004
- Thomas J. Bickerton 2004
- Scott J. Jones 2004
- Charles N. Crutchfield 2004
- Robert T. Hoshibata 2004
- Mary Virginia Taylor 2004
- Sally Dyck 2004
- Minerva G. Carcaño 2004
- Eben K. Nhiwatiwa 2004
- Carlos Poma 2004
- Hans Växby 2005
- David Kekumba Yemba 2005
- Rosemarie Wenner 2005
- Benjamin Boni 2005
- Patrick Streiff 2005
- Daniel Wandabula 2006
- Kefas Kane Mavula 2007

== Elected July 2008 ==
- Paul Leeland 2008
- Peggy Johnson 2008
- W. Earl Bledsoe 2008
- John Michael Lowry 2008
- Julius C. Trimble 2008
- Grant J. Hagiya 2008
- Elaine J. W. Stanovsky 2008
- James Dorff 2008
- Joaquina Filipe Nhanala 2008
- Rodolfo Alfonso Juan 2008
- Lito Cabacungan Tangonan 2008
- John K. Yambasu 2008

== Elected July 2012 ==
- Jonathan Holston 2012
- Kenneth H. Carter, Jr. 2012
- Sandra Steiner-Ball 2012
- Bill McAlilly 2012
- Deborah Wallace-Padgett 2012
- Martin McLee 2012
- Young Jin Cho 2012
- Cynthia Fierro Harvey 2012
- Mark Webb 2012
- Gary Mueller 2012
- Mike McKee 2012
- John Wesley Yohanna 2012

== Elected July 2016 ==
- Karen Oliveto 2016
- Tracy Smith Malone 2016
- Frank Beard 2016
- David Bard 2016
- Laurie Haller 2016
- Cynthia Moore-Koikoi 2016
- LaTrelle Easterling 2016
- Ruben Saenz, Jr. 2016
- James G. Nunn 2016
- Robert Farr 2016
- Sharma Lewis 2016
- David Graves 2016
- Leonard Fairley 2016
- Sue Haupert-Johnson 2016
- R. Lawson Bryan 2016
- Gabriel Unda Yemba 2016

== Elected November 2022 ==
- Delores Williamston, 2022
- David Wilson, 2022
- Laura Merrill, 2022
- Robin Dease, 2022
- Connie Mitchell Shelton, 2022
- Thomas M. Berlin, 2022
- Dan Schwerin, 2022
- Lanette Plambeck, 2022
- Kennetha Bigham-Tsai, 2022
- Héctor A. Burgos-Núñez, 2022
- Dottie Escobedo-Frank, 2022
- Cedrick D. Bridgeforth, 2022
- Carlo A. Rapanut, 2022

== Elected July 2024 ==
- Sandra K. Olewine, 2024
- Kristin Stoneking, 2024

== See also ==
- Conferences of the United Methodist Church
- Methodism
- United Methodist Church
- Bishop
- Lists of patriarchs, archbishops, and bishops
