= Frederick Newell =

Frederick Newell may refer to:

- Frederick Buckley Newell (1890-1979), American Methodist bishop
- Frederick Haynes Newell (1862–1932), American irrigation engineer
