= John Driscoll Fitz-Gerald =

American Hispanic scholar (1873–1946)

John Driscoll Fitz-Gerald II (May 2, 1873 – June 8, 1946) was an American Hispanic scholar, nephew of James Newbury Fitz-Gerald, born in Newark, N. J., graduated from Columbia University in 1895 (Ph.D., 1906), and also studied Romance philology at the universities of Berlin, Leipzig, Paris, and Madrid. He taught at Columbia University before becoming a professor of Spanish at the University of Illinois 1909-1929, and later at the University of Arizona, retiring shortly before his death.

Along the way, Doctor Fitz-Gerald became a member of the Hispanic Society of America and a corresponding member of the Spanish Royal Academy, edited La vida de Santo Domingo de Silos, por Gonzalo de Berceo (1904), wrote Versification of the "Cuaderna Via" as Found in Berceo's Vida de Santo Domingo de Silos (1905), A Reading Journey through Spain (1909), Rambles in Spain (1910), and wrote a translation with Thatcher Howard Guild, A New Drama by Manuel Thoma y Baus, (1915), and was associate editor of the Romanic Review. He was in charge of Hispanic subjects in the second edition of the New International Encyclopedia.
