= Wilbur Wong Yan Choy =

American bishop (1918–2021)

Wilbur Wong Yan Choy (Chinese: 黃彥才; pinyin: Huáng Yàncái; May 28, 1918 – December 29, 2021) was an American bishop in the United Methodist Church, elected in 1972. He was the first Asian American elected as a bishop in the church.

== Early life and education ==
Choy was born in Stockton, California on May 28, 1918, the son of Lie Yen and Ida Lee Choy. He earned an A.A. degree from Stockton Junior College (1944); a B.A. degree from the College of the Pacific (1946); and a Bachelor of Divinity degree from the Pacific School of Religion (1949). Choy also held honorary doctorates from the Pacific School of Religion (D.D., 1969) and the University of Puget Sound.

== Ordained ministry ==
While a college and seminary student, Choy served as associate pastor of the Chinese Methodist Church in Stockton. He was ordained deacon by Bishop James Chamberlain Baker in 1946. Following seminary, Choy was ordained elder by Bishop Donald Tippett, joining the California-Oriental Provisional Conference, continuing to serve the church in Stockton.

In 1954, Choy was appointed to serve St. Mark's Methodist Church, Stockton, in the California-Nevada Annual Conference. He later held pastorates in Woodland and Sacramento, California, as well. In 1967, he served as Chaplain of the California Senate. In 1969, Choy was appointed superintendent of the Bay View District.

== Episcopal ministry ==
Choy was elected to the episcopacy by the 1972 Western Jurisdictional Conference of the U.M. Church. He was assigned to the Seattle Episcopal Area, serving eight years. He was then assigned the San Francisco Episcopal Area, where he served for four years. He was President of the Council of Bishops of the U.M. Church, 1983-84. Bishop Choy also was a member of the Executive Committee of the National Conference of Chinese Churches.

He was an active member of the Board of Trustees of the Pacific School of Religion from 1970 until 1984. As such, he worked to strengthen the school's focus on Pacific Basin cross-cultural dialogue, diversity and excellence in ministry. Choy was named a Distinguished Alumni/ae of the Pacific School of Religion in 1997. Choy retired in 1984.

== Personal life and death ==
Choy married Grace Ying Hom 26 September 1940, and they remained together until her death on December 26, 1977. They had four children: Randolph, Jonathan, Phyllis, and Donnell. He died in Seattle, Washington on December 29, 2021, at the age of 103.

== Appreciation ==
Chairperson of the Board of Trustees of the Pacific School of Religion, Robert Riddel, wrote in 1984 on behalf of the Board:

"Bishop Choy's commitment to equality, liberation and a world free from racism and war are evident to all. As bishop, superintendent and local church pastor, Choy has brought to his ministry pastoral sensitivity, prayerful depth, the strengthening of diverse ministries, administrative care, and a saving sense of humor."

== See also ==
- List of bishops of the United Methodist Church
