= W. Maynard Sparks =

W. Maynard Sparks (December 16, 1906 – August 17, 1999) was an American Bishop of the Evangelical United Brethren Church (E.U.B.) and of the United Methodist Church, elected in 1958.

== Birth and family ==
Sparks was born on December 16, 1906, in Rockwood, Pennsylvania, a son of the Rev. George A. and Sarah (Heefner) Sparks. His father was a pastor in the Church of the United Brethren in Christ (i.e., New Constitution). Sparks was married to Blanche May Frank Sparks, who died in 1989. They had three sons: Lynn (a clergy member of the Rocky Mountain Annual Conference of the U.M. Church, who died in a mountain climbing accident in 1978), Fred of Elk Grove, California, and Robert of Lebanon, Pennsylvania. The Sparkses also had four grandchildren and two great-grandchildren (at the time of the bishop's death).

== Education ==
Sparks earned a B.A. degree from (United Brethren) Lebanon Valley College in Annville, Pennsylvania. He earned a Bachelor of Divinity degree from his denomination's only seminary, United Theological Seminary in Dayton, Ohio. He went on to earn a Master of Education degree from the University of Pittsburgh.

== Ordained ministry ==
Sparks was granted a Quarterly Conference License to Preach at the age of thirteen! This was followed by a permanent license. Later he entered the ministry of the Allegheny Annual Conference of the Church of the United Brethren in Christ (i.e., New Constitution). He served as the pastor of churches in Pennsylvania, as a conference superintendent, and as assistant professor of religion and chaplain at Lebanon Valley College. He was elected a delegate to the 1946 Uniting Conference, which joined the Evangelical Church and the Church of the United Brethren in Christ (i.e., New Constitution).

== Episcopal ministry ==
Sparks was elected to the episcopacy of the E.U.B. Church in 1958 in Harrisburg, Pennsylvania. As a bishop he supervised his denomination's Western Area. Among the highlights of his ministry, Sparks represented the E.U.B. Church in 1961 at independence ceremonies for the African nation of Sierra Leone, where he later also presided over several annual conference sessions. The E.U.B. Church had engaged in missionary activities in that Nation for many years.

Following the 1968 merger of the E.U.B. and Methodist Churches, Sparks was assigned to the Seattle Episcopal Area, serving there until his retirement in 1972. While in Seattle, he also served for approximately eighteen months as interim bishop of the Portland, Oregon Area following the death of Bishop Everett W. Palmer in January 1971.

== Death and funeral ==
Sparks died August 17, 1999, at his home in Sacramento, California, at the age of 92.

At the time of his death he was one of only two surviving bishops of the former E.U.B. Church, the other being Bishop Paul W. Milhouse of Franklin, Indiana. At the time of the 1968 E.U.B.-Methodist merger, there were one retired and seven active E.U.B. bishops. A memorial service for Sparks was held August 25, 1999, at the Faith United Methodist Church in Sacramento.

== See also ==
- List of bishops of the United Methodist Church
