= Prabhakar Christopher Benjamin Balaram =

Prabhakar Christopher Benjamin Balaram (10 July 1906 – 17 January 1968) was an Indian bishop of The Methodist Church (USA), elected in 1965.

== Early life ==
Benjamin (as he was known) was born 10 July 1906 in Hyderabad, India. His ancestors had been of a priestly caste. However, he had a remarkably dedicated Christian mother. On one occasion, at a special service held soon after his birth, his mother (then only sixteen) made an offering. She put into an envelope all the money she had, writing on the outside: "I offer to the Lord these three rupees and my son."

Balaram was an apt student. He studied engineering at the University of Edinburgh, with additional study in Denmark. He was chosen by the Methodist Episcopal Church as a Crusade Scholar, going onto further higher education in the United States. Completing his B.A. degree, Phi Beta Kappa, he went on to complete his Master's degree at the University of Pittsburgh.

== Ministry ==
Upon the completion of these educational pursuits, Balaram returned to India. He was enlisted by Bishop Pickett for development work, both urban and village Christian work. Over the course of his career, Rev. Balaram served in a variety of positions, becoming a widely acknowledged religious leader, especially in education and social work.

Rev. Balaram was elected to the episcopacy by the Central Conference of South Asia at the Central Conference meeting in January 1965. He was assigned to the Lucknow episcopal area.

Bishop Balaram was known as a highly creative person, full of ideas. Very articulate and winsome, he won many friends for India wherever he went. For instance, he was an intimate friend of Bishop Mathews for over thirty years.

Balaram also personally knew many of the political leaders of the newly independent India. He was able to help offset any damaging effect of the image of that day that the Indian Christian Church and community were in someway "foreign."

== Death and burial ==
Balaram died from a heart attack on 17 January 1968. He was buried in Lucknow.

== See also ==
- List of bishops of the United Methodist Church
