= William McFerrin Stowe =

- Born: 1913
- Died: November 24, 1988 (aged 74–75)
- Education: Hendrix College; Duke University; Boston University
- Occupation: Preacher

William McFerrin Stowe (1913 – November 24, 1988) was a U.S. Bishop of the Methodist and United Methodist Churches, elected in 1964.

== Biography ==
=== Early life ===
William McFerrin Stowe was born in 1913. He graduated from Hendrix College in 1938, where he became a member of the Sigma Chi fraternity. He also earned degrees from Duke University and Boston University.

=== Career ===
Prior to his election to the episcopacy, he was a pastor of Methodist churches in Texas and Oklahoma. He also served as a staff member of the General Board of Education of The Methodist Church, and as a delegate to various world conferences of Methodism. He became pastor of St. Lukes United Methodist Church, the largest church in Oklahoma City at the time, and third largest in world Methodism.

He was elected by the South Central Jurisdictional Conference of the Methodist Church, the only bishop elected by this conference in 1964.

In 1965, Southern Methodist University conferred the honorary degree Doctor of Laws upon Bishop Stowe.

Following Stowe's retirement as bishop of the Central Texas Conference in 1980, he was named bishop in residence at SMU's Perkins School of Theology.

He died on November 24, 1988.

=== Death ===
He died on November 24, 1988.

== See also ==
- List of bishops of the United Methodist Church
