= Paul Vernon Galloway =

American minister (1904–1990)

- Born: April 4, 1904; Mountain Home, Arkansas, USA
- Died: August 5, 1990 (aged 86); Tulsa, Oklahoma, USA
- Occupation: Methodist minister
- Years active: 1932–1990
- Known for: Methodist bishop

Paul Vernon Galloway (April 5, 1904 – August 5, 1990) became an American United Methodist minister after graduation from Yale Divinity School. He was elected Bishop of the United Methodist Church in 1960. After retiring in 1972, he was recalled to serve as bishop for three years in Texas and one year in Louisiana. He was then appointed Bishop-in-residence at Boston Avenue Methodist Church in Tulsa, Oklahoma, where he lived until his death from cancer.

== Early education ==
Paul Vernon Galloway was born April 5, 1904, in Mountain Home, Arkansas, son of James Jesse and Ella (Burkhead) Galloway. His education included an A. B. at Henderson-Brown College (Note: Now named Hendrix College, a Methodist-related school based in Conway, Arkansas) 1926; Postgraduate, Southern Methodist University, 1927; Bachelor of Divinity, Yale University (1929); and postgraduate studies at University of Chicago, 1933.

== Ministry ==
Galloway was ordained to the Methodist ministry in 1931 and served as a pastor at nine different churches prior to his election as bishop in 1960. He worked in Texas, Arkansas and Louisiana and in 1964, he was awarded a Doctor of Laws (honorary) by Southern Methodist University. He retired in 1972, but then was called to serve as Bishop of the Houston Episcopal Area for three years, and for one additional year in Louisiana. Galloway also served as Bishop-in-Residence of the Boston Avenue Methodist Church in Tulsa. He had pastored that church for ten years prior to his election to the episcopacy.

== Death ==
Galloway was living in Tulsa when he died of cancer on August 5, 1990, aged 86, at the St. John Medical Center there. He was survived by his wife and son.

== Notable achievements ==
Galloway served on the boards of Southern Methodist University and the University of Arkansas. In the 1960s he was involved in integrating the dining rooms at the Arkansas State Capitol and those at the University of Arkansas.

== See also ==
- List of bishops of the United Methodist Church
