= Edwin Ferdinand Lee =

Bishop and missionary

Edwin Ferdinand Lee (10 July 1884 – 14 September 1948) was a Missionary Bishop of the Methodist Episcopal Church and The Methodist Church, elected in 1928.

== Birth and family ==
He was born in Eldorado, Iowa, the son of Andrew and Carrie (Anderson) Lee. Edwin married Edna Dorman 8 June 1909.

== Education ==
Lee earned the B.S. degree from Northwestern University in 1909, where he was also a member of the Sigma Alpha Epsilon fraternity. He attended the Garrett Graduate School of Theology on the same campus, earning the B.D. degree in 1924. Concurrently he attained the M.A. degree at the University of Chicago (1924).

== Ordained, Military and Missionary Service ==
Rev. Lee was appointed pastor in New Hampton, Iowa (1908–10). He then was assigned as a missionary to Batavia, Java and as the pastor of the Wesley Church in Kuala Lumpur, Malaya (1910–12). Rev. Lee then was appointed pastor of Central Methodist Church in Manila, Philippines (1912–15).

Following this initial overseas work, Rev. Lee was appointed again to Iowa (Rockford, 1915–17). He also served as a chaplain in the U.S. Army, A.E.F. during World War I.

In 1919 he became the associate secretary of the Board of Foreign Missions of the M.E. Church, with offices in N.Y.C., serving in this post until 1924. He was then sent overseas again, as the pastor of the Wesley Church of Singapore, Straits Settlements and as the superintendent of the Singapore District of the M.E. Church (1924–28).

== Episcopal ministry ==
Rev. Lee was elected a missionary bishop at the Methodist Episcopal Church General Conference of 1928. He was assigned to the Manila Episcopal Area of the Philippine Islands Central Conference. The Manila Area included Malaysia and the Philippines.

Bishop Lee was a delegate to the International Missionary Conference in Madras, India (1938). He was made a Fellow of the Royal Geographical Society, London. He was a member of the American Academy of Political and Social Science, New York City. His great interest and involvement in the Far East led him to membership in the American Institute of Pacific Relations, Chicago, as well as the Council on Foreign Relations. Bishop Lee also was appointed in 1944 the director of the General Commission on Army and Navy Chaplains in Washington, D.C. His offices were at 1137 Woodward Building in Washington.

== Honors and awards ==
Bishop Lee was made a Decorated Officer of the Academy, Order of University Palms (France) in 1919. He received the Cross of Mercy from Yugoslavia in 1921. He also received the (British) King George V Silver Jubilee Medal in 1935.

Bishop Lee was also honored with several honorary doctorates. He received a D.D. (1918) and an LL.D. (1939) from Upper Iowa University. He was also given a D.D. degree by Garrett Graduate School of Theology in 1928. And in 1945 Northwestern University honored him with the S.T.D. degree.

== See also ==
- List of bishops of the United Methodist Church
