= Richard Green Waterhouse =

Richard Green Waterhouse (24 December 1855 – 9 December 1922) was a bishop of the Methodist Episcopal Church, South, elected in 1910.

== Family ==
Richard was born near Spring City, Rhea County, Tennessee, the son of Franklin and Lorinda Rachel (Thompson) Waterhouse. He was twice married. His first wife was Carrie Steele of Crystal Springs, Mississippi, whom he married 3 February 1887. They had one child, a daughter, Edith. Mrs. Carrie Steele Waterhouse died 11 September 1891. Rev. Waterhouse then married Mrs. Mary Thomas Carriger of Morristown, Tennessee 10 October 1894. They had two sons, Richard and Leon. Mary Carriger had two sons from her first marriage, Wesley Carroll and Herbert Michael Carriger, who Rev. Waterhouse raised as his own.

== Education ==
Richard was educated in the local and high schools of his community. He attended Hiwassee College, and graduated from Emory and Henry College in 1885.

== Ordained ministry ==
Richard was converted to the Christian faith in 1873. He was Licensed to Preach in 1878 and admitted to the Holston Annual Conference of the M.E.Church, South. He served the Altamont and Spencer Mission, and Jonesboro. He was then appointed Junior Preacher on the Abingdon Circuit, serving for four years. This was followed by two years on the Radford District.

== Academic Ministry ==
In 1892 Rev. Waterhouse was elected Professor of Mental and Moral Science in Emory and Henry College. He was elected President of the College in 1893. Refusing to allow an increase of his salary, he never received more than $1,300.00 per year during the seventeen years he served. President Waterhouse gave himself to the elimination of the College's debt, and to rebuilding for the new demands then facing the M.E. Church, South in the field of college education.

President Waterhouse soon became widely known among the educators of the Church, South. He was in great demand as a speaker. He became known also as one of the most powerful preachers of the connection. He was elected a delegate to the General Conferences of 1894-1910.

== Episcopal ministry ==
Rev. Waterhouse was elected to the Episcopacy at the 1910 General Conference of the M.E. Church, South. His first assignment as Bishop was to the Pacific Coast. He moved to Los Angeles and served that area four years.

By the end of his first quadrennium as Bishop, his health showed serious impairment and continued to decline. He moved to Emory, where he was well loved and honored by his neighbors and his home Annual Conference. He took the superannuation relationship in 1918.

== Retirement and death ==
In the fall of 1922, the Waterhouses moved to Knoxville, Tennessee to be near both of their sons. Bishop Waterhouse had grown rather feeble, but kept up his effort to recover, taking regular exercises. On 7 December 1922, while thus engaged, walking on a street on a gloomy afternoon, Bishop Waterhouse was struck by a motorist and fatally injured. He was hurried to a hospital, but did not regain consciousness.

Bishop Waterhouse died 9 December 1922. He was buried at Emory, Virginia two days later on 11 December 1922.

== Selected writings ==
- Address: The Challenge of the Great West, Second Missionary Conference, 1913.

== See also ==
- List of bishops of the United Methodist Church
