= John Edward Robinson (bishop) =

American bishop (1849–1922)

John Edward Robinson (12 February 1849 – 16 February 1922) was a missionary bishop of the Methodist Episcopal Church, elected in 1904.

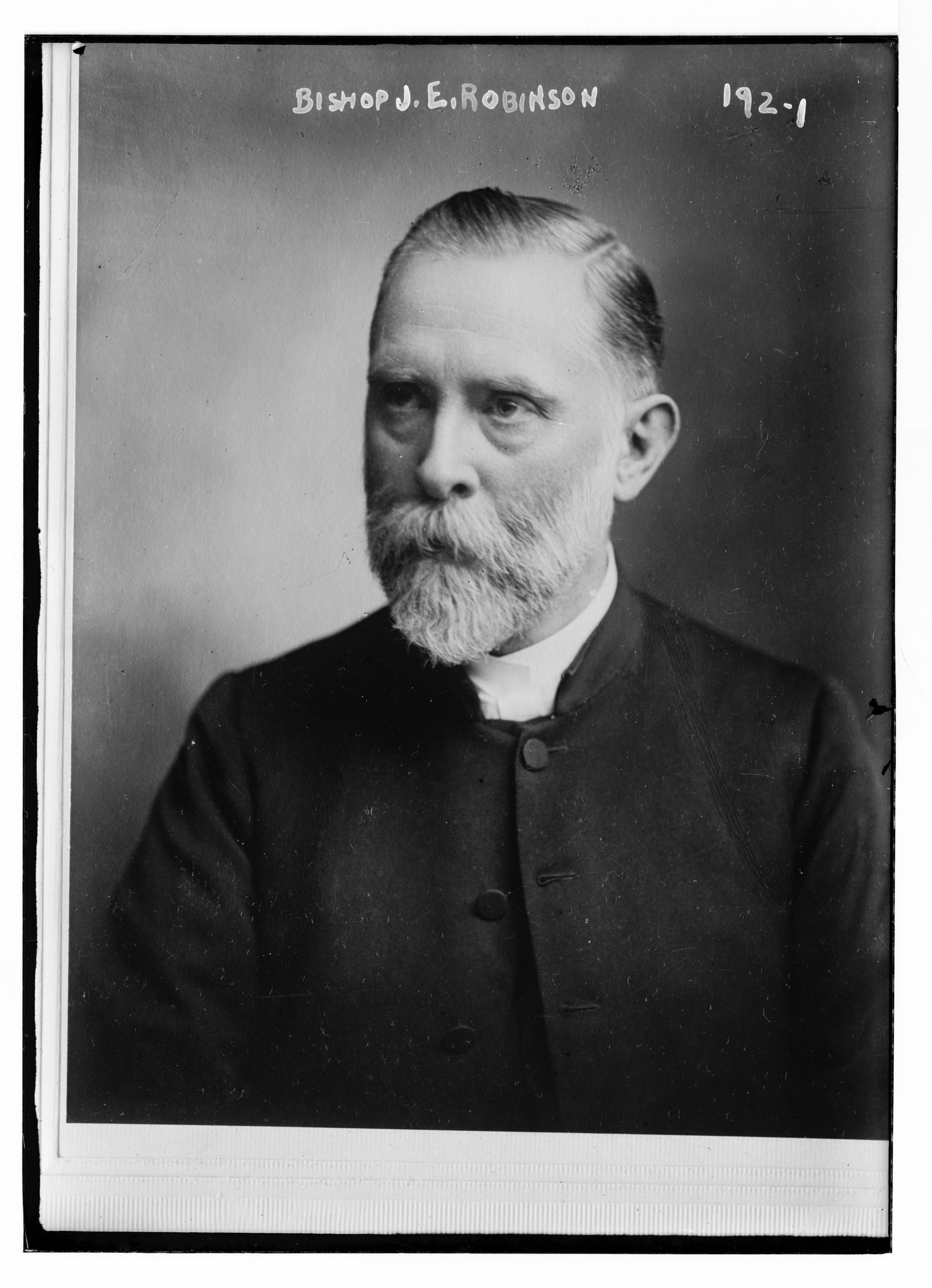

== Birth and family ==
John was born in Gort, County Galway, Ireland (28 miles north of Limerick). His parentage was English, the son of James and Jane Robinson. John was fatherless at the age of six. He came to the U.S. in 1865. He married Retta Terry on 15 November 1876. They had the following children: Ruth E., Helen E., John F., Bessie E., Flora L. and Muriel E.

== Education ==
John was converted to the Christian faith while a teacher of boys at the 104th St. Methodist Church in New York City. He graduated from Drew Theological Seminary in 1874. He also received a D.D. degree from Albion College in 1902.

== Ordained ministry and missionary service ==
Robinson went to India in 1874 as a missionary. His appointments were as follows: Hyderabad (1874–77), Bangalore (1877–80), and Rangoon, Burma (1880–86). He then became the presiding elder of the Burma District (1884–86). He was appointed to Simla in 1886, but then again as a presiding elder, this time of the Bombay District (1887–96). He was presiding elder then of the Asansol District (1896-00) and the Calcutta District (1900–04).

Robinson also served as the editor of the Burmah Evangelist (1884–87) and of the Indian Witness (1896–1904).

== Episcopal ministry ==
The Rev. Dr. John Edward Robinson was elected the Missionary Bishop for Southern Asia in 1904. In his theology, Bishop Robinson was considered "liberal evangelical."

== See also ==
- List of bishops of the United Methodist Church

== Selected writings ==
- Apostolic Succession Refuted, Rangoon, 1884
- The Rise and Progress of Methodism, 1899
