= Eben Samuel Johnson =

Eben Samuel Johnson (8 February 1866 – 9 February 1939) was an English-American bishop of the Methodist Episcopal Church, elected in 1916.

== Birth and family ==
Born in Warwickshire, England, he was a son of William and Catharine (née Sidwell) Johnson. His father was an English Methodist preacher. Bishop Johnson was also descended from one of John Wesley's helpers. Eben married Sarah Tilsley, with whom he had children Samuel D., Arthur H., and Dorothea.

== Early career and education ==
Eben took a teacher training course in England. He also attended the University of Oxford. He taught school in London for a time. He also engaged in newspaper work from 1885 to 1889.

Eben then emigrated to the United States of America, where he earned both the A.B. and the A.M. degrees from Morningside College. Syracuse University later awarded him an honorary Doctor of Divinity degree.

He became a Freemason at an unknown date, and was later admitted to Kane Lodge No. 377, Ida Grove, Iowa on 13 December 1907; he resigned from this lodge on 14 October 1910 and joined instead the Landmark Lodge No. 103, Sioux City, Iowa on 12 December 1910.

== Ordained ministry ==
The Rev. Eben Samuel Johnson preached on an English circuit at the age of sixteen. In America he entered the Northwest Iowa Annual Conference in 1889. As a pastor he served the following appointments: Danbury, Wall Lake, Mapleton, Sac City, Webster City, and Rock Rapids. He then was appointed Superintendent of the Ida Grove District. In 1909 he was appointed pastor of the First Methodist Church, Sioux City, where his address was 514 7th St., Sioux City.

He served his annual conference as the secretary, then the chairman of the examining board; as the president of the Conference Board of Education; and as a member of M.E. General Conferences, 1904–16. He served as general conference journal secretary for a time, as well. He also was a trustee of Morningside College.

During the Spanish–American War, the Rev. Johnson served as a chaplain in the 52nd Iowa Infantry Regiment, U.S. Volunteers. He also served in the 56th Regiment of the Iowa National Guard, first with the rank of captain, then major.

== Episcopal ministry ==
The Rev. Eben Samuel Johnson was elected first in 1916 as a missionary bishop of the M.E. Church for Africa. In 1920 he was elected a bishop.

Bishop Johnson died at the Veterans' Hospital in Portland, Oregon. He was buried in Riverview Abbey in Portland.

== Selected writings ==
- "Emigration", Oxford degree thesis, in the Methodist Bishops' Collection at Southern Methodist University.
- "Stenographic Report Lectures" of R. L. Ottley, Regius Professor of Pastoral Theology, Oxford, 1906, and of W. Lock, Dean Ireland Professor of Exegesis, Oxford, 1906. also in the Methodist Bishops' Collection at Southern Methodist University.
- "General Conference Reports and Writings", also in the Methodist Bishops' Collection at Southern Methodist University.

== See also ==
- List of bishops of the United Methodist Church
