= Naphtali Luccock =

American bishop (1853–1916)

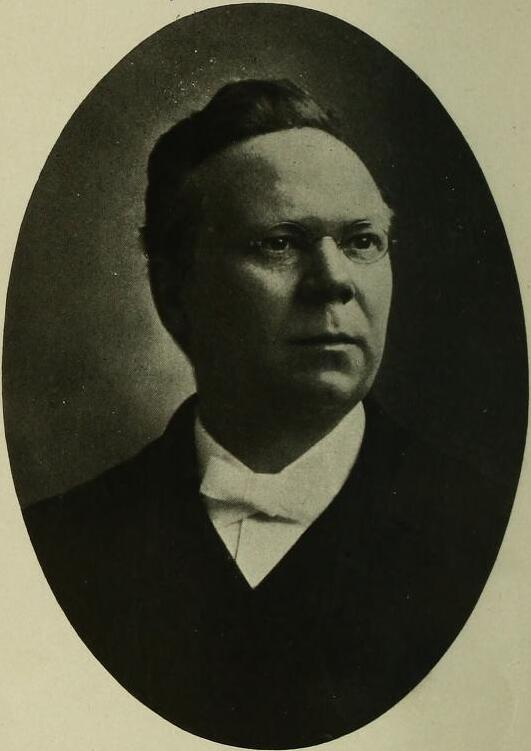
- Luccock in 1905
- Born: September 28, 1853; Kimbolton, Ohio, U.S.
- Died: April 1, 1916 (aged 62); La Crosse, Wisconsin, U.S.
- Burial place: Bellefontaine Cemetery, St. Louis, Missouri

Naphtali Luccock (28 September 1853 – 1 April 1916) was an American bishop of the Methodist Episcopal Church, elected in 1912.

He was born on September 28, 1853 in Kimbolton, Ohio. He entered the traveling ministry of the Pittsburgh Annual Conference of the M.E. Church (which at that time included eastern Ohio) in 1874. Later he was transferred to the St. Louis conference.

Before his election to the episcopacy, Luccock was a pastor. His was a brief episcopal incumbency, for he died within his first four years, on April 1, 1916 in La Crosse, Wisconsin. He was buried in Bellefontaine Cemetery in St. Louis, Missouri.

He is the author of The Illustrated History of Methodism (1901), with J. W. Lee and J. M. Dixon, and The Royalty of Jesus (1905), sermons.

== Other sources ==
- Leete, Frederick DeLand, Methodist Bishops. Nashville, The Methodist Publishing House, 1948.
- Methodism: Ohio Area (1812-1962), edited by John M. Versteeg, Litt.D., D.D. (Ohio Area Sesquicentennial Committee, 1962).

== See also ==
- List of bishops of the United Methodist Church
