= David Frederick Wertz =

American bishop

David Frederick Wertz (October 5, 1916 – October 16, 2013) was an American bishop of the United Methodist Church, elected in 1968.

Wertz was born in October 1916 in Lewistown, Pennsylvania. He graduated from Newport High School, and earned a Bachelor's degree from Dickinson College in Carlisle, Pennsylvania in 1937. He earned a Master's degree and a doctoral degree in theology from Boston University in 1939 and 1940, respectively.

The Rev. Mr. Wertz served as a pastor in several churches in Pennsylvania, and as the superintendent of the Williamsport District of The Methodist Church.

Between 1955 and 1968, Wertz served as President of Lycoming College. He died in Carlisle, Pennsylvania, in October 2013 at the age of 97.

== See also ==
- List of bishops of the United Methodist Church

== Sources ==
- The Council of Bishops of the United Methodist Church
- InfoServ, the official information service of The United Methodist Church.
