= Sally Dyck =

American minister

Bishop Sally Dyck
- Resident Bishop, Chicago Episcopal Area
- Church: United Methodist Church
- Diocese: Northern Illinois Annual Conference
- In office: July 1, 2012 – December 31, 2020
- Predecessor: Hee-Soo Jung
- Successor: John L. Hopkins
- Previous posts: Resident Bishop, Minnesota Annual Conference

Orders
- Ordination: 1981
- Consecration: 2004

Personal details
- Born: Ritzville, Washington

Sally Dyck is an American minister who is a bishop in the United Methodist Church, the second largest Protestant denomination in the United States. In 2021, she will begin serving as the Ecumenical Officer of the Council of Bishops of the United Methodist Church.

== Biography and education ==
Sally Dyck was born in Ritzville, Washington into a Mennonite family. She later joined the United Methodist Church as a young adult. She attended Boston University's College of Liberal Arts, and graduated magna cum laude with a Bachelor of Arts degree in political science.

In 1978, she graduated magna cum laude from Boston University School of Theology with a Master of Divinity (M.Div.). In 1978, she also attended the Bossey Ecumenical Institute in Switzerland, which is affiliated with the World Council of Churches, earning a graduate certificate in ecumenical studies.

She received a Doctor of Ministry (D.Min.) in Black Church Studies from United Theological Seminary in Dayton, Ohio, in 1989. She received a Bishop James S. Thomas fellowship for her studies.

Dyck was ordained as a United Methodist Elder in 1981 in the East Ohio Annual Conference. After ordination, she served as a pastor in two churches, before becoming district superintendent in the Wooster, Ohio area. She then returned to parish ministry at Garfield Memorial Church.

== Episcopal service ==
Dyck was elected to the episcopacy in 2004 and first served the Minnesota Conference. After eight years there, she was appointed to the Northern Illinois Conference in July 2012, and re-appointed in 2016.

In addition to her responsibilities as bishop, Dyck serves as the President of the General Board of Church and Society for The United Methodist Church.

She has served two terms on the Central Committee of the World Council of Churches, having been elected at the Porto Allegre Assembly of the WCC in 2006, and re-elected for a second term of seven years in 2013. For her second term, she was one of three representatives from the UMC on the Executive Committee, which has 150 members drawn from churches worldwide.

Dyck is scheduled to retire as a bishop at the end of 2020. She was elected as the new Ecumenical Officer of the Council of Bishops of the United Methodist Church in November 2019, and will begin her four year term on January 1, 2021. As the Ecumenical Officer, she has responsibility for overseeing the ecumenical relationships of the United Methodist Church. She succeeds Bishop B. Michael Watson in this role. She takes on this new position at a time when discussions are ongoing regarding the possible division of the United Methodist Church. At the next quadrennial meeting of the General Conference, tentatively scheduled for late August 2021, delegates will discuss proposals which would allow congregations to form one or more separate denominations. The division would allow jurisdictions and conferences with differing opinions on the ordination of LGBTQ clergy and the officiating of same sex marriage to separate, and end the debates over opposing views.

== Writings ==
Dyck has written a devotional guide for women called A Faithful Heart—Daily Guide for Joyful Living.

With her niece, Sarah Ehrman, she co-authored A Hopeful Earth: Faith, Science and the Message of Jesus, which explores the topic of environmental stewardship, from Christian and scientific perspectives.

== Personal life ==
She married Kenneth Ehrman in 1976.

== See also ==
- List of bishops of the United Methodist Church
