= D. Stanley Coors =

American Methodist bishop (1889-1960)

D. Stanley Coors (1 August 1889 – 6 March 1960) was an American bishop of The Methodist Church, elected in 1952.

== Birth and family ==
Stanley was born in Pentwater, Michigan, the son of August Henry and Julia Marie (Duttenhofer) Coors. He married Margaret Havens 23 September 1917. They had the following children: Robert Stirling, Winifred (Mrs. Matthew Van Keuren), and Lucile Marie (Mrs. Harvey W. Lynn).

== Education ==
Stanley earned the A.B. degree from Albion College in 1914. He earned the B.D. degree from Drew Theological Seminary in 1917. He also earned the A.M. degree from Columbia University in 1917. The Rev. D. Stanley Coors also was honored by Albion College with the Doctor of Divinity degree in 1931.

== Ordained ministry ==
The Rev. Coors was received on trial and ordained deacon in the New York East Annual Conference of the Methodist Episcopal Church in 1917.

Prior to his election to the episcopacy, Rev. Coors had a distinguished career in the Methodist ministry in the State of Michigan. As such, he was a close friend and a fellow laborer with (future-Bishop) Marshall Russell Reed. Among the Michigan churches he pastored, the Rev. Dr. Coors served the Central Methodist Church of Lansing, Michigan for fourteen years (until elected a bishop). His final sermon, preached July 1952, was "There Is So Little Time."

One biographer states about Bishop Coors, "he was a refined, quiet, Christian gentleman, tall and spare in appearance. He commanded great respect wherever he went and was a thoughtful preacher."

== Episcopal ministry ==
Bishop Coors was elected by the North Central Jurisdictional Conference of The Methodist Church in 1952. He was assigned to the St. Paul Episcopal Area. This proved to be the only assignment he would serve. He was, however, host to the 1956 General Conference of The Methodist Church at Minneapolis.

== Death and burial ==
Bishop Coors became ill on an episcopal visit to Germany, from which illness he never fully recovered. He died on 6 March 1960 in Minneapolis, just a few weeks before he was due to retire. His body is buried in Lansing, Michigan.

== See also ==
- List of bishops of the United Methodist Church
