= James Dorff =

American clergyman

Bishop James E. Dorff (June 14, 1947 – June 7, 2021) was an American clergyman. He was elected Bishop of the United Methodist Church in 2008 but announced his resignation in early December 2015 after admitting to violating his marriage and ordination vows.

== Early life ==
Dorff was born in Tulsa, Oklahoma, on June 14, 1947. He spent some time in El Paso, Texas, before graduating from Muskogee High School. He later earned a B.A. from Oklahoma City University before receiving a Master of Theology from the Perkins School of Theology.

== Ministry ==
Dorff was ordained as an Elder in the United Methodist Church in 1972. He was elected a Bishop in 2008 after 36 years as a pastor in the North Texas Conference. Following a complaint, Dorff admitted to violating his clergy vows announced his resignation from the position.

== Personal life ==
Dorff had two sons. He died on June 7, 2021, of pancreatic cancer.

== See also ==
- List of bishops of the United Methodist Church
