= Rüdiger Rainer Minor =

German bishop of the United Methodist Church (1939–2017)

Rüdiger Rainer Minor (1939–2017) was a German bishop of the United Methodist Church, elected in 1986. He was born 22 February 1939 in Leipzig, Germany, the son of a Methodist family. He went to school and university in his home city. He is a graduate of Karl Marx University, Leipzig (Dr. Theol. and Dr. Theol. Habil., 1968) and of the United Methodist Theological Seminary in Bad Klosterlausnitz, Germany. He married Gerlinde Johanna Müller on 24 October 1964. They have three children: Mechthild Barbara, Bertram Christoph, and Friedrun Susanne, as well as nine grandchildren. He died 3 September 2017.

Rüdiger joined the Middle Germany Annual Conference in 1964 and was appointed assistant minister at Plauen. He was ordained elder by Bishop Friedrich Wunderlich in 1966. While pastoring in Jena (1970–76) he became a part-time faculty member at the United Methodist Theological Seminary in Bad Klosterlausnitz. He was appointed full-time faculty in 1976, and served as the director of the seminary, 1984–86. On 22 May 1986 he was elected bishop by the Central Conference in the German Democratic Republic and was assigned to the Dresden Episcopal Area. In 1992 he was assigned to the Commonwealth of Independent States. He was elected bishop for the Eurasia Area by the North European Central Conference in 1993.

Minor was a delegate to the 1980 General Conference of the U.M. Church. He was a member of the U.M. General Council on Ministries (1980–86), and of the World Methodist Historical Society beginning in 1973, serving on its executive committee (1976–86) and as a vice-president for Europe (1986–91).

== See also ==
- List of bishops of the United Methodist Church
