= Jashwant Rao Chitambar =

Indian bishop (1879–1940)

Jashwant Rao Chitambar (5 September 1879 – 4 September 1940) was the first Indian bishop of the Methodist Episcopal Church of North and South India, elected in 1930.

== Early life ==
Chitambar was born in Allahabad, United Provinces, India. He was the son of native preacher Rajaram Chitambar, who was a converted Mahratta Brahmin, one of the first converts to Christianity as a result of missionary work in western India. Both of Chitambar's parents were of the high caste Indians, who converted to Christianity.

== Ordained ministry ==
Chitambar was accepted into the membership of the North India Annual Conference in 1907. He became a Hindustani pastor, district superintendent, and educator. He was the first Indian delegate to General Conference. One of the founders of the National Missionary Society of India, Chitambar was a delegate to the World's Missionary Conference in Edinburgh, Scotland, in 1910.

== Episcopal ministry ==
He was elected to the episcopacy of the M.E. Church by the Central Conference of Southern Asia in 1930. His election made him the first native Protestant bishop. He became ill on his return from the General Conference of 1940, and he died 4 September 1940 in Jubbulpore, India. He was buried in Jubbulpore.

== Selected works ==
- John Wesley, the Man Who Did Exploits, in God's Heroes Our Examples, 1914.
- Mahatma Gandhi: His Life, Work and Influence, 1933.
- Translation of Christian Hymns.
- Member of committee that revised "The Standard Hindustani Dictionary."

He was first Indian Native Bishop in MEC

== See also ==
- List of bishops of the United Methodist Church
