= Michael J. Coyner =

Rev. Dr. Michael J. Coyner is a bishop in the United Methodist Church, the second-largest Protestant Christian denomination in the United States.

== Biography ==
Coyner is from Anderson, Indiana. He received his B.A. from Purdue University, his M. Div. from Duke Divinity School, and his D.Min. degree from Drew Theological Seminary (now Drew University).

== Tenure as Bishop ==
Coyner was elected as bishop in 1996 and first served two terms in the Dakotas Episcopal Area. In 2004 he was assigned to the Indiana Area where he is serving his third term.

== Publications ==
=== Books ===
- Making a Good Move (Abingdon Press, 1999)
- Prairie Wisdom (Abingdon Press, 2000)
- The Race to Reach Out (Abingdon Press, 2004)
- A Year With John Wesley and Our Methodist Values (Discipleship Resources, 2008)
- The Andrew Paradigm: How to Be a Lead Follower of Jesus (2012 Abington Press)

== See also ==
- List of bishops of the United Methodist Church
