= Edward Wendall Kelly =

American bishop

Edward Wendall Kelly (December 27, 1880 – 1964) was an American bishop of the Methodist Church, elected in 1944.

Kelly was born in Mexia, Texas on December 27, 1880. He was ordained in the Methodist Episcopal Church, South in 1917. Prior to his election to the episcopacy, he served as a pastor in places such as Texas, Detroit, Michigan, and St. Louis, Missouri. He also taught evangelism in Schools of Methods. Kelly died in 1964.

== See also ==
- List of bishops of the United Methodist Church
