= Bowman Foster Stockwell =

American bishop

Bishop Bowman Foster Stockwell
- Born: September 17, 1899; Either Shawnee, Ohio or Oklahoma
- Died: June 5, 1961 (aged 61); Buenos Aires, Argentina
- Resting place: British Hospital in Chacarita of Buenos Aires, Argentina
- Occupations: Bishop, Reverend, American Methodist Missionary, Teacher, Scholar & Theologian
- Organization: The United Methodist Church
- Spouse: Vera Loudon Stockwell
- Children: Eugene Loudon Stockwell

Bowman Foster Stockwell (17 September 1899 – 5 June 1961) was an American Methodist missionary, teacher, scholar and theologian. In 1960, he was elected to Bishop of The United Methodist Church (UMC), which is a mainline Protestant denomination and a major part of Methodism in the United States.

== Early life ==
Bowman Foster Stockwell was born on 17 September 1899 to Reverend Eugene S. Stockwell (1865–1921) and Addie Bunnell Stockwell (1865–1926). There is a discrepancy where he was born in Shawnee, Ohio or in the state of Oklahoma. Bowman Foster Stockwell had three siblings; however two of them died as children: his older brother, Eugene Earl Stockwell died at 7 years old and his younger sister was Emma Louise Stockwell died at 9 days old. His only surviving sibling was his oldest brother, Benjamin Paul Stockwell. As a young man, Bowman Foster Stockwell served for a period of time as Secretary to the great missionary statesman, John R. Mott.

== Missionary & academic ministry ==
In 1926, the Board of Missions of the Methodist Episcopal Church sent Reverend Bowman Foster Stockwell to teach in Buenos Aires, Argentina at the Union Seminary, which was an institution for educating students in theology. The Union Seminary is now known as La Facultad Evangelica de Teologia, which translated into English means The Faculty of Evangelical Theology. From 1927 until 1960 he was the Director of the Union Seminary and was responsible for the seminary being recognized at a university degree level. An acknowledged scholar and theologian, Reverend Bowman Foster Stockwell wrote a number of books and edited several papers. He was also instrumental in acquiring a valuable collection on the little-known Spanish Reformation, which is housed in the library of La Facultad Evangelica de Teologia today Instituto Superior Evangélico de Estudios Teológicos ISEDET in Buenos Aires, Argentina.

== Episcopal ministry ==
In 1960, Reverend Bowman Foster Stockwell was elected to the episcopacy by the Latin America Central Conference of The Methodist Church and was thereafter referred to as Bishop Bowman Foster Stockwell. He was assigned to the Pacific Episcopal Area and chose to live in Lima, Peru. Bishop Bowman Foster Stockwell was strongly committed to ecumenism and worked to promote unity among the world's Christian Churches. He was active in ecumenical affairs, both in Latin America and on the world stage; however, his episcopal career unfortunately ended after thirteen months due to his death.

== Death ==
Bowman Foster Stockwell died on 5 June 1961 at the age of 61 years old in Buenos Aires, Argentina. His body was cremated and his ashes interred at British Hospital in the barrio (neighbourhood) of Chacarita in Buenos Aires, Argentina. He was survived by his wife, Vera Loudon Stockwell, of Lima, Peru and his son, Eugene Loudon Stockwell, of Salto, Uruguay.

== See also ==
- List of bishops of the United Methodist Church
