= Melvin George Talbert =

American United Methodist bishop (1934–2023)

Melvin G. Talbert
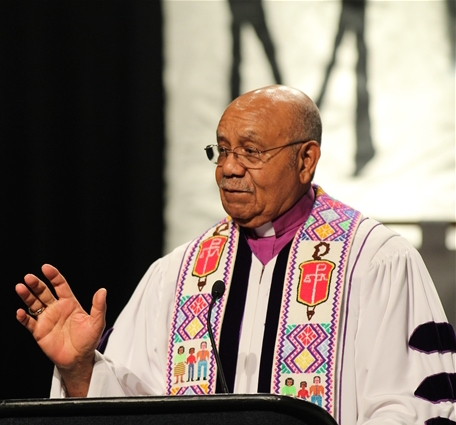
- Bishop Melvin Talbert speaking.
- Denomination: The United Methodist Church

Posting
- Title: Bishop

Personal

Bishop Melvin G. Talbert (June 14, 1934 – August 3, 2023) was an American bishop in The United Methodist Church (UMC), the second largest Protestant denomination in the United States.

== Biography ==
Born in Clinton, Louisiana, Talbert was one of seven children of sharecropper parents, Florence George and Nettles. He was married to Ethelou Douglas for thirty-eight years prior to her death in February 1999. Talbert has one daughter, Evangeline Violet, married to James H. Sifford, Sr. They have three children: Kaetlin, James, Jr. and Melvin Douglas. Talbert married Marilyn W. Magee on April 1, 2000.

After attending public schools and working various jobs, Talbert received a BA degree from Southern University, Baton Rouge, LA, and an M.Div. degree from Interdenominational Theological Center (ITC)/Gammon Theological Seminary, Atlanta, GA. While at ITC, Talbert became president of the student body during his middler year, while serving a two-point charge in Tennessee. He was ordained Deacon by Bishop Willis J. King, Jr., and was ordained Elder by Bishop Gerald H. Kennedy. After serving as interim at St. John's (Watts), Associate at Wesley, Los Angeles, and Pastor at Hamilton, Los Angeles, Melvin was named Associate Council Director, Southern California-Arizona Conference. One year later, he was appointed district superintendent for the Long Beach District. In 1973, Melvin was elected general secretary for the General Board of Discipleship, Nashville, where he served until he was elected to the episcopacy in 1980 and was assigned to the Seattle Area. He was assigned to the San Francisco Area in 1988, where he retired on August 31, 2000.

Talbert was visiting professor of evangelism at Claremont School of Theology, 1978. He was a delegate to General Conference from 1968–1980 and was a member of the Social Principles Commission, 1968–1972. He was a trustee and chair of the board at Gammon, and at various times served as trustee at the University of Puget Sound, Claremont School of Theology, and Pacific School of Religion. His civil rights protest experiences impacted his life profoundly, and he took pride in having spent three days and nights in jail with Dr. Martin Luther King, Jr. He was a sports enthusiast, loved camping, was a hacker golfer, and played a little guitar.

Talbert was a member of the General Council on Ministries, and was chair of its Missional Priority Coordinating Committee 1976–1984; a member of the General Commission on Religion and Race, 1980–1988, and served as its president 1983–88; and a member of the General Commission on Christian Unity and Interreligious Concerns 1988–1996 and 2000–2004. He was a director of the National Council of Churches (NCCCUSA) from mid-1970s to August 2004, and served as its president 1996–1997. He was a member of the World Methodist Council Executive Committee, and the World Council of Churches Central Committee (its executive committee and finance committee). He was honored as a Distinguished Alumnus of his seminary in 1990. He was secretary for the Council of Bishops (COB) for two quadrennia 1988–1992 and 1992–1996, during which time he carried the title head of communion. Talbert was one of forty presidential guests to accompany US President Bill Clinton on his peace pilgrimage to Northern Ireland and Ireland in December 1995, and has visited the White House on several occasions representing the NCCCUSA and the Council of Bishops. Talbert was ecumenical officer for the Council of Bishops 2000–2004 and served as interim executive director of Black Methodists for Church Renewal, Inc.

Talbert died on August 3, 2023, at the age of 89.

== See also ==
- List of bishops of the United Methodist Church
