= David Seth Doggett =

American clergyman (1810–1880)

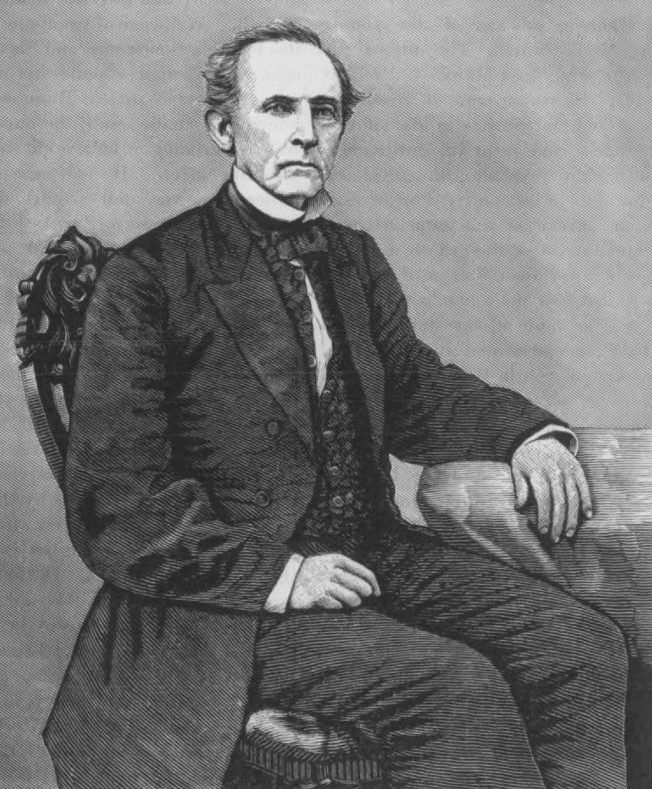
- Born: January 26, 1810; Lancaster County, Virginia, U.S.
- Died: October 27, 1880 (aged 70); Richmond, Virginia, U.S.
- Resting place: Hollywood Cemetery
- Education: University of Virginia
- Occupations: Methodist clergyman, professor

David Seth Doggett (January 26, 1810 – October 27, 1880) was an American Bishop of the Methodist Episcopal Church, South, elected in 1866.

== Biography ==
=== Early life ===
David Seth Doggett was born on January 26, 1810, in Lancaster County, Virginia. He was descended from the Rev. Benjamin Doggett, a Church of England immigrant to Virginia about 1650, Rector of White Chapel Church in Lancaster County. (Rev. Benjamin Doggett immigrated to Virginia in 1669/70 from England according to most sources.) He had Revolutionary forebears, and his parents were Methodists. His father was a lawyer. He was educated at the University of Virginia in Charlottesville, Virginia. He began studying law, but changed to the ministry.

=== Career ===
He joined the Virginia Annual Conference in 1829, serving as an itinerant minister, traveling through the Southern states. In 1866, he accepted a professorship at Randolph–Macon College.

=== Death ===
He died in Richmond, Virginia on October 27, 1880. He was buried in Hollywood Cemetery.

== See also ==
- List of bishops of the United Methodist Church
