= William Turner Watkins =

William Turner Watkins was an American bishop of the Methodist Episcopal Church, South (MECS) and of The Methodist Church, elected in 1938. He also distinguished himself as a Methodist pastor, as a university professor, and as an editor.

== Birth and family ==
William was born 26 May 1895 in Maysville, Georgia, a son of Howell Davis and Sarah Jane (née Cochran) Watkins. William married Frances Edith Hancock 21 January 1914. They had children Howell Jackson, Lamar Hancock, William Turner Jr., Luther Tate, and John Scott.

== Education ==
William earned the Ph.B. degree in 1926 from Emory University. He then studied at the University of Edinburgh in Scotland (1926–27) and at Yale Divinity School (1927–28).

== Ordained, academic and editorial ministries ==
The Rev. William Turner Watkins entered the ordained ministry of the North Georgia Annual Conference of the MECS in 1914. He served various appointments as pastor between 1914 and 1930. In 1930 he became the professor of church history in the School of Theology at Emory University. He served in this position until his election to the episcopacy. The Rev. Watkins was a delegate to MECS General Conferences in 1934 and 1938. He also served as president of the Board of Church Extension of his denomination.

From 1932 until 1936, the Rev. Watkins also served as the editor of the Wesleyan Christian Advocate, an important periodical of his denomination.

== Episcopal ministry ==
The Rev. William Turner Watkins was elected and consecrated a bishop of the Methodist Episcopal Church, South by the final General Conference of this denomination in 1938. In 1940, he was assigned the Columbia episcopal area of the (new) Methodist Church, serving until 1944. He then was assigned the Louisville Area. His offices were at 1115 Fourth Ave., Louisville, Kentucky.

Among other responsibilities, Bishop Watkins served as a member of the General Board of Missions and Church Extension, the General Board of Education, and the General Board of Hospitals and Homes, all of The Methodist Church. He also was a trustee of Emory University.

== Honors ==
Bishop Watkins was honored by Emory University with the degree Doctor of Divinity in 1939. He also was a member of the International Society of Theta Phi. There is a church on Westport Road in Louisville, Kentucky called Watkins United Methodist Church that is named after him.

== Selected writings ==
- Out of Aldersgate, 1938.
- The Christian Hope, 1954.
- The Nature and Meaning of Christian Faith, 1960

== See also ==
- List of bishops of the United Methodist Church
