= Sylvanus C. Breyfogel =

American bishop

Sylvanus Charles Breyfogel (July 20, 1851 – November 24, 1934) was an American bishop of the Evangelical Association, elected in 1891.

== Life ==
Sylvanus Breyfogel was born in Reading, Pennsylvania to Sarah Ely and Seneca Breyfogel. He married Kate Boas in 1877 and together they had two sons and four daughters. He attended Reading High School; the Union Seminary of Pennsylvania; Illinois Wesleyan University, from which he received a Ph.B; Otterbein University (D.D, 1891); and Ohio Northern University (LL.D, 1909).

== Career ==
Breyfogel was licensed to preach by the East Pennsylvania Annual Conference of the Evangelical Association. He was ordained in 1873. He served as a pastor and as a district superintendent until his election to the episcopacy.

Breyfogel was made a bishop by the 1891 General Conference of the Evangelical Association, in which position he served for 39 years. He retired at the 1930 General Conference.

As of 1912, he was chair of the theology department at Schuylkill Seminary, since absorbed into Albright College.

== See also ==
- List of bishops of the United Methodist Church
