= Horace Mellard DuBose =

American bishop

Horace Mellard DuBose (7 November 1858 – 15 January 1941) was an American bishop of the Methodist Episcopal Church, South and The Methodist Church, elected in 1918. Bishop DuBose gained notability as an author, editor, and a leader in the American temperance movement.

== Early life and family ==
DuBose was born on a cotton plantation in Choctaw County, Alabama. He was the son of Hezekiah and Amanda (Hawkins) DuBose. DuBose married Miss Rosa Chaney on 6 December 1882. She died in 1895. He then married Mrs. Gertrude V. Amis in 1899. He was educated at Waynesboro High School, Waynesboro, Mississippi, and under private tutors. He earned no college degree. Emory and Henry College conferred the honorary degree of Doctor of Divinity upon him in 1891.

== Ordained and editorial ministries ==
The Rev. DuBose was admitted on trial by the Mississippi Annual Conference of the M.E. Church, South in 1877. He served the following appointments in Mississippi: Chotard Circuit (1877–79) and Fayette Circuit (1879–80). He then transferred to the Texas Annual Conference, where he served these appointments: St. James Church, Galveston (1881–82); Huntsville (1882–84); Shearn Church, Houston (1884–86); and the Marvin Church in Tyler (1885–88).

Rev. DuBose then transferred again, to the Los Angeles Annual Conference, where he was appointed Pastor of the Trinity Methodist Church in Los Angeles (1889–90). He then became Editor of The Pacific Methodist Advocate (1890–94). He transferred once again to Texas (the East Texas Annual Conference), where he again became the Pastor of the Marvin Methodist Church in Tyler (1895–96). Then transferring back to Mississippi, he was appointed Pastor of First Methodist Church, Jackson (1896–98).

In 1898 Rev. DuBose was elected Secretary of the Epworth League, serving the Church in this capacity for the next twelve years, insisting that the General Conference not re-elect him to that office. He then transferred to the North Georgia Annual Conference where he was appointed Pastor of St. John's Church in Augusta (1910–12). In 1915 Rev. DuBose was elected Book Editor of the M.E. Church, South. He held this office until his election to the episcopacy.

== Episcopal ministry ==
The Rev. Dr. Horace Mellard DuBose was elected to the office of Bishop and consecrated as such at the 1918 General Conference of the Methodist Episcopal Church, South.

Bishop DuBose died in Nashville at the age of 82, the "elder statesman" of the M.E. Church, South. Noting his importance as a temperance leader, upon his death Time magazine quoted him as having said in 1932, "If the Angel Gabriel should come down and tell me that he had changed his mind on prohibition and wanted it resubmitted, I would not follow him."

== Publications ==
- The Crisis of Criticism (1923)
- The Bodily Resurrection of Jesus Christ (1924)
- The Law and the Prophets (1924)
- The Bible and the Ages (1930)

== See also ==
- List of bishops of the United Methodist Church
