= Ernest T. Dixon Jr. =

American bishop

Ernest Thomas Dixon Jr. (13 October 1922 - 29 June 1996) was an American bishop of the United Methodist Church, elected in 1972. He was born in San Antonio, Texas.

== Education ==
Ernest earned his B.A. degree from Samuel Huston College (now Huston–Tillotson University) in Austin, Texas in 1943. He earned his Bachelor of Divinity degree from Drew Theological Seminary in Madison, New Jersey in 1945. He received several honorary doctorates over the course of his ministry.

== Ordained and educational ministry ==
Prior to his election to the episcopacy, Ernest served as a pastor of churches in Texas, New York and New Jersey. He then served as the Director of the Religious Extension Service at the Tuskegee Institute in Alabama. He was the executive secretary of the West Texas U.M. Annual Conference Board of Education. He also served as the President of Philander Smith College in Little Rock, Arkansas. He also had the distinction of serving as a Staff Member of two U.M. churchwide agencies: the Board of Education of The Methodist Church, based in Nashville; and the Program Council of the U.M. Church, based in Dayton, Ohio.

== Episcopal ministry ==
Ernest was elected bishop by the eight-state South Central Jurisdictional Conference of the U.M. Church, the first African American elected by this Jurisdictional Conference. He was assigned to the Kansas Episcopal Area, where he served for eight years. Then he was assigned to the San Antonio, serving twelve years before retiring in 1992. He maintained his home in San Antonio in retirement.

Bishop Dixon was president of the Council of Bishops of the U.M. Church, 1988-89. As president he joined other religious leaders for a meeting with President George H. W. Bush at the White House. Bishop Dixon also visited Poland where he preached in Warsaw on Christmas Day.

== Death and funeral ==
Bishop Dixon died 29 June 1996 at the Methodist Hospital in San Antonio, where he had been a patient. He had been looking forward to being discharged, and a planned trip. "His death was sudden and unexpected," according to the Rev. Jerry J. Smith, Assistant to then-Bishop of the San Antonio Area, Bishop Ray Owen.

Bishop Dixon's funeral service was held 3 July 1996 at the University U.M. Church, San Antonio, with burial in Edna, Texas. He was survived by his wife Ernestine Gray Clark Dixon, and four children: the Rev. Freddie B. Dixon Sr. of Austin, Texas; Leona Louise Thomas and Muriel Jean Dixon, both of San Antonio; and Sherryl Dianne Blue of Washington, D.C. Bishop Dixon's first wife, Lois, died of cancer in 1977. A son, Ernest Reese Dixon, died in 1990.

The Rev. Smith, a former member of Bishop Dixon's Cabinet, remembered him as a "distinguished" and "dynamic" and "much loved" leader who rose from humble beginnings on the east side of San Antonio to become a religious leader of the entire city. "We are proud that he came to serve the place of his birth," Smith said.

== See also ==
- List of bishops of the United Methodist Church
