= James G. Nunn (bishop) =

Bishop James (Jimmy) G. Nunn
- Bishop (retired)
- Church: United Methodist Church
- Archdiocese: Oklahoma Episcopal Area
- Diocese: Oklahoma Annual Conference; Oklahoma Indian Missionary Conference
- In office: July 15, 2016 – August 31, 2024
- Predecessor: Bishop Robert “Bob” Hayes
- Successor: Bishop Laura Merrill
- Previous posts: NWTX Conference Director of Mission and Administration and Church Development

Orders
- Ordination: 1983
- Consecration: 2016
- Education: McMurry University (BA); Asbury Theological Seminary (M.Div.), (D.Min.)

James G. Nunn is a retired bishop in the United Methodist Church, the second largest Protestant denomination in the United States.

== Biography and Education ==
James (Jimmy) Nunn graduated from McMurry University with a Bachelor of Arts (B.A.) degree, and he graduated from Asbury Theological Seminary with a Master of Divinity (M.Div.) degree. He also received a Doctor of Ministry (D.Min.) degree from Asbury Theological Seminary.

Nunn was ordained in the Northwest Texas Conference as a United Methodist Deacon in 1980 and as a United Methodist Elder in 1983.

== Episcopal Service ==
Nunn was elected to the episcopacy in 2016 and assigned to the Oklahoma Episcopal Area comprising the Oklahoma Conference and the Oklahoma Indian Missionary Conference. He served in this role for 8 years, until his retirement on August 31, 2024.

== See also ==
- List of bishops of the United Methodist Church
