= Roberto Valenzuela Elphick =

British-Chilean bishop (1873–??)

Roberto Valenzuela Elphick was a British-Chilean bishop of the Methodist Episcopal Church, elected in 1936. He was born 29 August 1873 in Antofagasta, Chile. He was the son of a British nitrate producer, Donald E. Elphick, and Tomasa Valenzuela, a Chilean Roman Catholic. Roberto was converted to the Evangelical Church by reading a New Testament given him by a Methodist Sunday School teacher, Mina Fawcett. Later his father, mother, and most of his brothers were also converted.

Roberto joined the Presbyterian Church, and was ordained a minister in 1897. He transferred to the Chile Annual Conference of the M.E. Church in 1906. Prior to his election to the episcopacy, Roberto served as a pastor, educator, and evangelist. He was a delegate to the International Missionary Conference in Jerusalem, 1928. He was elected bishop in Buenos Aires, and was consecrated to that office in Columbus, Ohio.

== Selected writings ==
- Autobiography, in Spanish, a copy of which resides in the Methodist Bishops' Collection
- The Teachings of Christ

== See also ==
- List of bishops of the United Methodist Church
