= Costen Jordan Harrell =

- Born: February 12, 1885; Gates County, North Carolina, U.S.
- Died: December 28, 1970 (aged 85); Atlanta, Georgia, U.S.
- Education: Trinity College; Vanderbilt University
- Occupation: Bishop

Costen Jordan Harrell (February 12, 1885 – December 28, 1970) was a bishop of The Methodist Church in the United States, elected in 1944.

== Early life ==
Costen was born on February 12, 1885, on his grandfather's plantation, about five miles north of Sunbury, Gates County, North Carolina. He is of early English American descent, with a Methodist inheritance on both sides of his family. His great grandfather was a class leader under Bishop Francis Asbury. Costen was the son of Samuel Isaac and Isadore (Costen) Harrell. Costen married Amy Patton Walden 6 June 1917.

Costen earned the A.B. degree in 1906 from Trinity College (now Duke University). He earned the B.D. and M.A. degrees in 1910 from Vanderbilt University.

== Career ==
Harrell entered the Traveling Ministry of the Tennessee Annual Conference of the Methodist Episcopal Church, South in 1909. He was ordained in 1911. Rev. Harrell served the following appointments in North Carolina: Epworth Church, Raleigh (1910–13); Calvary Church, Durham (1913–16), then Trinity Church, Durham (1916–19); and First Church, Wilson (1919–20). In Georgia, Rev. Harrell served First Church, Atlanta (1920–25). In Virginia, Rev. Harrell served Epworth Church, Norfolk (1925–29) and Monument Church, Richmond (1929–33). Harrell was then sent to West End Methodist Church in Nashville, Tennessee (1933–44), from which he was elected to the episcopacy.

Prior to his election to the episcopacy, he served as a pastor. In the reunification of U.S. Methodism (1939) he was the Secretary of the Committee on Temporal Economy and Lay Activities.

Randolph-Macon College honored Rev. Harrell with the D.D. degree in 1929. Duke University did the same in 1940. Birmingham-Southern College awarded the Litt.D. in 1945.

== Death ==
Harrell died on December 28, 1970, in Atlanta, Georgia.

== Selected writings ==
- The Bible: Its Origin and Growth, paper covers, 190 pp., 1926.
- Walking with God, 1928; another edition, 1946.
- In the School of Prayer,' 1929.
- Friends of God, 1931.
- Prophets of Israel, 1933.
- The Radiant Heart, paper covers, 1936.
- The Methodist Child's Membership Manual, 1940.
- The Way of the Transgressor, 1941.
- The Word of His Grace - Studies in Ephesians, paper, 78 pp., 1943.

== External Sources ==
- Stuart A. Rose Manuscript, Archives, and Rare Book Library

== See also ==
- List of bishops of the United Methodist Church
