= Ram Dutt Joshi =

Ram Dutt Joshi (16 November 1916 – 26 December 1976) was an Indian bishop of the United Methodist Church, elected in 1968. He was born in Dwarahat, Uttarakhand state of northern India. Prior to his election to the episcopacy, Joshi served as a pastor, district superintendent, seminary professor, and educational secretary.

Joshi was elected a bishop by the Southern Asia Central Conference of the U.M. Church. Bishop Joshi died at the time of the Central Conference meeting in Lucknow.

== See also ==
- List of bishops of the United Methodist Church
- Kumaoni people
