= Hoyt McWhorter Dobbs =

American Methodist bishop

Hoyt McWhorter Dobbs (November 16, 1878, in Antioch, Alabama – December 9, 1954, in Shreveport, Louisiana) was an American bishop of the Methodist Episcopal Church, South and The Methodist Church, elected in 1922.

Prior to his election to the episcopacy, he served as a professor of Christian doctrine and as the dean (1916–20) of the Perkins School of Theology at Southern Methodist University, University Park, Dallas County, Texas.

In 1935, he became one of the founding members of Theta Phi, the professional honor society for clergy.

== See also ==
- List of bishops of the United Methodist Church
