= George Harvey Bickley =

George Harvey Bickley (February 25, 1868 – December 24, 1924) was an American bishop of the Methodist Episcopal Church, elected in 1920.

== Personal life and career ==
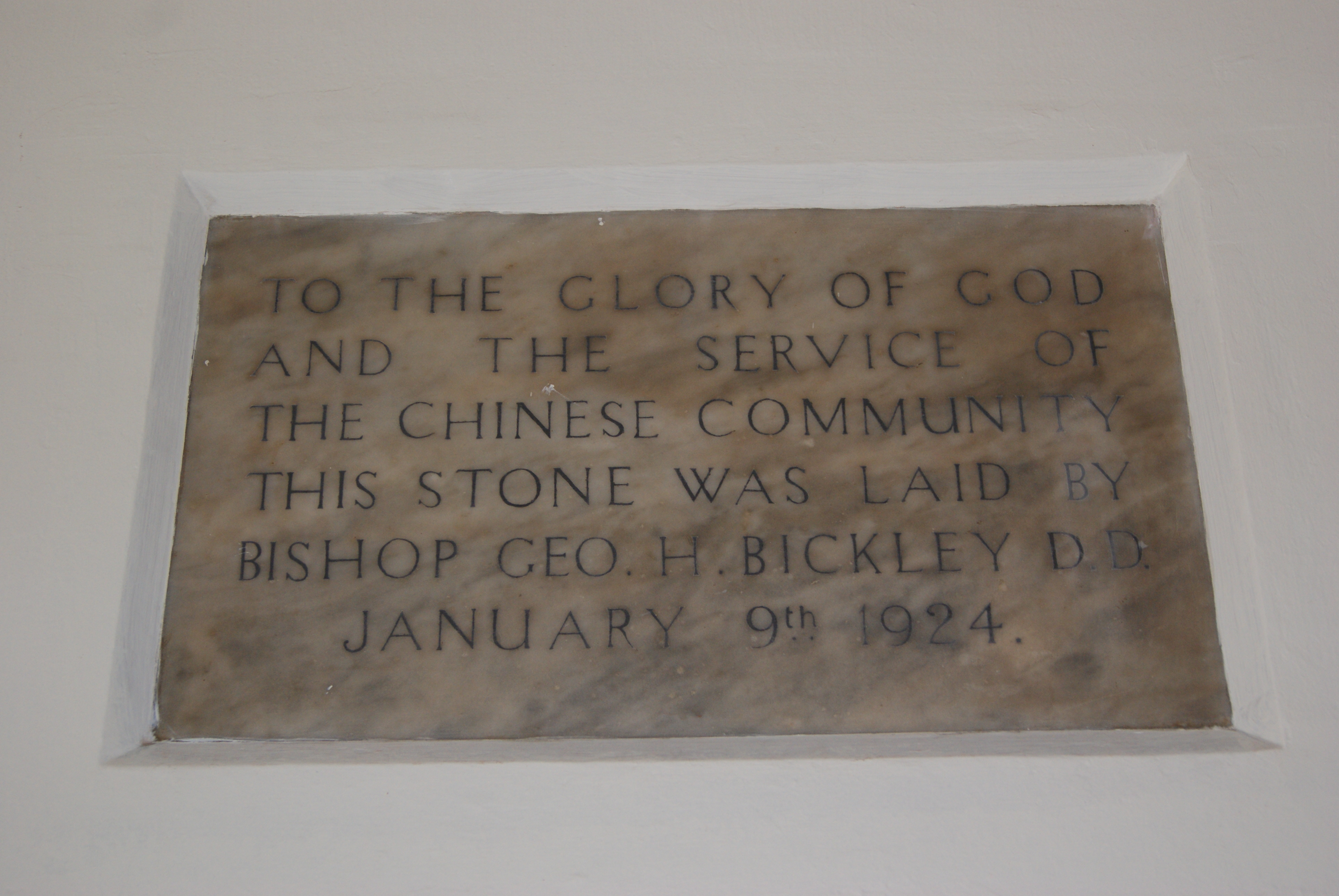
A plaque commemorating the construction of Telok Ayer Chinese Methodist Church in Singapore which was unveiled by Bickley on January 9, 1924

Bickley was born in Philadelphia, Pennsylvania. He was from an old Philadelphia family, his father and grandfather being local elders and church builders. Indeed, his grandfather gave up a fortune and was disowned for becoming a Methodist.

George entered the Traveling Ministry of the Philadelphia Annual Conference in 1890. His uncle and six of his cousins were also in the Methodist ministry. One of these cousins was Bishop Charles Wesley Burns. Rev. Bickley was at one time chairman of Philadelphia Sunday meetings. He was Area Secretary of the Centenary of American Methodism. Also prior to his election to the episcopacy, he served as a pastor and a district superintendent.

Bickley died on December 24, 1924, in Philadelphia. He was buried in St. James Cemetery in Olney, Philadelphia.

== Selected writings ==
- Address: The Problem of the City, Pennsylvania Convention, Methodist Men, in Better Things, C.F. Armitage, editor, 1916.
- Sermons and addresses which are part of the Methodist Bishops' Collection.

== Biography ==
Funeral addresses given by Bishops Berry, Leonard and Welch, typed, also in the Methodist Bishops' Collection.

== See also ==
- List of bishops of the United Methodist Church
