= Clement Daniel Rockey =

American writer and missionary (1889–1975)

Clement Daniel Rockey (September 4, 1889 – August 15, 1975) was an American bishop of the Methodist Church.

== Biography ==
He was born in Cawnpore, India, a son of Noble Lee Rockey, an American missionary pioneer in India.

Clement entered the North India Annual Conference of the Methodist Episcopal Church in 1914. Prior to his election to the episcopacy, he served as a missionary, an educator, and a district superintendent. For some years he was chaplain to British Methodist troops in Bareilly. He was elected bishop by the Methodist Central Conference of Southern Asia. He returned to the United States and lived out his life in Eugene, Oregon.

== Family life ==
Rockey was married to Helen Cady and they had three sons, Harold, Kenneth and Lee. Helen was the daughter of Henry Cady and Hattie Yates, who were Methodist missionaries to China; she wrote several books including The Promise.

== Legacy ==
An English-speaking congregation meets in a school chapel in Lahore; it is dedicated in memory of Bishop Rockey.

== Selected writings ==
- Making and Telling Bible Stories, also Roman-Urdu, Kahani ka Banana aur Sunana, 1923.
- 52 Lessons on Christian Life and Practice, Masihi Zindagi aur Usul, 1926.
- Book of Worship for village work, 1935.
- Pamphlet, Come and Let Us Worship, 1945.

== See also ==
- List of bishops of the United Methodist Church
