= Richard J. Wills Jr =

Richard J. Wills Jr (born 3 August 1942) is a bishop of the United Methodist Church, elected in 2004.

== Birth and family ==
He married Eileen (Willis) Wills on 12 June 1965. They have four children: Richard J. Wills III of Lakeland, Florida; Suzanne Wills Hart of West Palm Beach, Florida; Johanna Wills Clark of Orlando, Florida; and Rebekah Wills Stephens of Sebring, Florida.

== Education ==
Richard graduated in 1964 with a B.S. degree in Psychology from Florida Southern College. He earned an M.Div. degree from Candler School of Theology, Emory University in 1967. He has received Honorary Doctorates from Bethune-Cookman College and from Florida Southern.

== Ordained ministry ==
Rev. Wills was ordained a Deacon in the Florida Annual Conference of The Methodist Church in 1965. He was ordained an Elder in 1969. He was appointed pastor of the Crystal Lake Methodist/U.M. Church, Lakeland, Florida, from 1967 to 71. He was pastor of the Mandarin U.M.C., Jacksonville, Florida, 1971–75. In 1975, Rev. Wills was appointed Associate Council Director on the Conference Council of Ministries, Florida Annual Conference, serving in this capacity until 1978. He became the pastor of the Englewood U.M.C. in 1978, and the senior pastor of Christ Church United Methodist, Fort Lauderdale from 1986 to 2004.

Rev. Wills was also very involved in Annual Conference and General Church responsibilities. He chaired his conference's Board of Ordained Ministry (1984–1988), also serving as a member (1980-1988 and 2002–2004). He was on the Terring Committee of the Large Church Initiative of the General Board of Discipleship for twelve years. He was a member of the Southeastern Jurisdictional Committee on Episcopacy (1996–2004). He was a member of the Board of Trustees of Bethune-Cookman College (1995–2000). He held many other local and regional offices, as well.

== Episcopal ministry ==
Rev. Wills was elected a delegate to the Southeastern Jurisdictional Conference and the General Conference of the U.M. Church 1988–2004, leading his delegation in 2000, and 2004. He was elected to the episcopacy at the 2004 Jurisdictional Conference, having been endorsed by the Florida Conference delegation. He was assigned to the Nashville Episcopal Area (the Tennessee and Memphis Annual Conferences).

Bishop Wills took volunteer early retirement on September 1, 2011. He announced his retirement 16 months after having back surgery. He said in a letter to the conference that the reason for his decision was that the neurosurgeon who performed his surgery, "indicates my lifestyle (travel and a lot of sitting) is contributing to my ongoing pain and discomfort."

== Selected writings ==
- Waking to God's Dream: Spiritual Leadership and Church Renewal, Nashville: Abingdon Press, 1999.
- author of many articles on spiritual leadership

== See also ==
- List of bishops of the United Methodist Church
