= William Hughes (Methodist bishop) =

American clergyman

William Alfred Carroll Hughes (1877 – 1940) was an American bishop in The Methodist Church, elected in 1940.

He was the first bishop elected by the then Central Jurisdiction of the Church. He was elected at the first meeting of the Central Jurisdiction, on 20 June 1940, receiving a total of 81 votes (78 votes being necessary for election). At the time of his election he was the Secretary of Colored Work of the Board of Home Missions and Church Extension of the Methodist Church. He died within a month after his election to the episcopacy.

== See also ==
- List of bishops of the United Methodist Church
