= Edward Gonzalez Carroll =

American bishop (1910–2000)

Edward Gonzalez Carroll (7 January 1910 – 1 January 2000) was an American bishop of the United Methodist Church, elected in 1972.

== Birth and family ==
Carroll was born 7 January 1910 in Wheeling, West Virginia, the son of Julius Sylvester and Florence Dungee Carroll. He was married to Phenola Valentine. Their children included a son, Edward Carroll Jr, and a daughter, Nansi. The Carrolls also had two grandsons. Phenola died 20 June 1999.

== Education ==
Carroll earned the A.B. degree in 1930 from Morgan College. He earned the B.D. degree in 1933 from Yale Divinity School. Carroll also earned an M.A. from, and did work toward the D.Ed. degree at Columbia University and Union Theological Seminary.

The Rev. Carroll was awarded an honorary degree LL.D. in 1967 by Morgan College.

== Ordained and academic ministry ==
The Rev. Carroll was ordained deacon in 1933 by Bishop Edwin Holt Hughes. He was ordained elder by Bishop Hughes in 1935. He served as a pastor in the following appointments: St. Andrews M.E. Church Mount Washington, Baltimore, Maryland), the Salem, Virginia M.E. Church Washington, D.C. in the Washington Annual Conference. He also served for one year as pastor in Grafton-Buckhannon, West Virginia.

The Rev. Carroll then became Professor of Religion and the Director of Voluntary Religious Activities at Morgan College, serving for four years.

== Military and YMCA service ==
The Rev. Carroll served as a U.S. Army chaplain for four years during World War II. He was chaplain of the 93rd Engineers. After the war he accepted a position as Associate Secretary of the National Student YMCA for another four years.

== Resumed pastoral ministry ==
The Rev. Carroll reentered pastoral ministry as the Associate Pastor and Director of Christian education of the St. Marks Methodist Church in New York City. He transferred to the New York Annual Conference in 1950. In 1955 he transferred back into the Washington Conference and was appointed to Sharp Street Memorial Methodist Church, Baltimore, serving for seven years. Then he was appointed the Superintendent of the Washington District of the Washington Conference.

Following a merger of the Washington and Baltimore conferences, Rev. Carroll became in 1966 the Superintendent of the Washington West District of the new Baltimore Conference. In 1968 he was appointed Pastor of Marvin Memorial Methodist Church, Silver Spring, Maryland. He was elected by his annual conference as a delegate to several General Conferences of The Methodist Church.

== Episcopal ministry ==
The Rev. Dr. Edward Gonzalez Carroll was elected to the episcopacy of the United Methodist Church by the Northeastern Jurisdictional Conference in 1972. He was assigned to the Boston episcopal area, where he served until his retirement in 1980.

Bishop Carroll was also active in the NAACP, the North Conway Institute, the Disciplined Order of Christ, and the Urban League.

In retirement, Bishop Carroll served as a visiting professor and a bishop-in-residence at the Boston University School of Theology. He was an interim director of Black Methodists for Church Renewal, and an interim executive director of the Morgan Christian Center at Morgan State University in Baltimore.

Bishop Carroll also was a tennis enthusiast for many years.

== Death and funeral ==
Bishop Carroll died 1 January 2000 in Gainesville, Florida, just six days short of his ninetieth birthday. Survivors included his son, Edward Jr., his daughter, Nansi, and two grandsons, Edward III and Scott Julian. Funeral services were held 11 January 2000 at the University United Methodist Church in Gainesville. There were plans for a memorial service at the Boston University Chapel as well.

== See also ==
- List of bishops of the United Methodist Church
