= Charles Bayard Mitchell =

American bishop of the Methodist Episcopal Church

Charles Bayard Mitchell (1857–1942) was an American bishop of the Methodist Episcopal Church, elected in 1916. He also distinguished himself as a pastor and in service to his denomination.

== Birth and family ==
Charles was born 27 August 1857 in Allegheny City, Pennsylvania. He was the son of the Rev. Daniel Patrick Mitchell (a M.E. preacher) and Anne Eliza (Baker) Mitchell. At the age of five, Daniel moved his family to Kansas. Charles married Miss Clara Aull of Pittsburgh, Pennsylvania 6 July 1882. She was the daughter of James Aull and a sister of Major Willam F. Aull (State Senator).

== Education ==
After completing high school, and receiving further preparations in the classics by his sister, Mrs. L.B. Kellogg, at the age of eighteen Charles entered the freshman class at Mount Union College, Mount Union, Ohio. He completed the first three years of the college course in just two years (1875–77). He then left Mount Union for Allegheny College, Meadville, Pennsylvania, at that time a school of higher grade. Charles entered the senior class and graduated June 1879 with the A.B. degree. While at Allegheny he was editor-in-chief of the "Crescent," the official organ of the Delta Tau Delta fraternity. Charles graduated with the honors of his class, being designated "Master Orator."

Charles went on to earn the A.M. degree at Allegheny June 1882. He also earned the Ph.D. degree from Allegheny in 1892.

== Honorary Degrees ==
The Rev. Dr. Mitchell was awarded the honorary degree of D.D. by Allegheny College in 1893. He also received the LL.D. degree from Baker University in 1911.

== Ordained ministry ==
Immediately following college graduation, the Rev. Mitchell began preaching as a Supply Pastor under the Presiding Eldership of his father. The younger Mitchell had been Licensed to Preach while still in college. In March 1880 he entered the South Kansas Annual Conference of the M.E. Church as a Probationer, being a charter member of the conference. He was ordained Elder in this Conference before transferring to the S.W. Kansas Conference in 1881. He transferred again, to the Kansas Conference, in 1884, where he was appointed pastor in Leavenworth. Among his other appointments were Coyville, Burton and Marion.

He went on to serve large churches scattered from New Jersey to Minnesota. By the time he was elected to the Episcopacy, he had been a member of eight different Annual Conferences.

== Episcopal ministry ==
Bishop Mitchell was assigned to the St. Paul Episcopal Area from 1916 to 1924. He was then sent to the Philippines, serving until his retirement in 1928. Mitchell died on February 23, 1942, and is interred at the Forest Lawn Memorial Park in Glendale, California.

== See also ==
- List of bishops of the United Methodist Church
