= Mary Ann Swenson =

American bishop

Mary Ann Swenson is an American bishop of the United Methodist Church, elected in 1992.

== Birth and family ==
Mary Ann Swenson (née McDonald) was born in 1947 in Pine Bluff, Arkansas. She was raised and educated in Jackson, Mississippi, where she was active in Sunday school, church youth group, and choir at the Capitol Street Methodist Church. She married Jeffrey Joe Swenson of Elma, Washington in 1968.

== Episcopal ministry ==
Swenson was elected to the episcopacy of the United Methodist Church by the 1992 Western Jurisdictional Conference. She was assigned the Denver episcopal area, where she served until 2000. She was then assigned the Los Angeles Area, including the California-Pacific Annual Conference and the Korean Mission of the Western Jurisdictional Conference. In 2004 she Swenson was reassigned to the Los Angeles Area and in 2008, that assignment was extended to 2012.

== See also ==
- List of bishops of the United Methodist Church
