= William Wallace Duncan =

American bishop

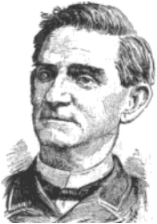
- Born: December 20, 1839; Boydton, Virginia
- Died: March 2, 1908 (aged 68); Spartanburg, South Carolina
- Education: Wofford College
- Occupation: Clergyman

William Wallace Duncan (December 20, 1839 – March 2, 1908) was an American bishop of the Methodist Episcopal Church, South, elected in 1886.

== Biography ==
William Wallace Duncan was born on December 20, 1839 (some sources have December 27, 1839), in Boydton, Mecklenburg County, Virginia, of Scots-Irish descent and of scholarship. He was the son of David Duncan, a native of Ireland and of University of Edinburgh in Scotland. David settled in Kentucky, then migrated to Virginia, where he was a professor of ancient languages at Randolph–Macon College. (David's other son, James, would eventually become president of Randolph-Macon College, serving from 1868 until his death in 1877.) David later moved his family to Spartanburg, South Carolina, where he had accepted a faculty position at Wofford College.

William graduated from Wofford College in 1858 and joined the Virginia Annual Conference of the M.E. Church, South, in 1859. He was a chaplain of the Army of the Confederate States of America during the American Civil War. William's younger brother, Thomas, also served in the Civil War and died in the Battle of Seven Pines.

After the war, Rev. Duncan served in Virginia as the pastor of the Methodist church on Main Street in Danville for four years, on Granby Street in Norfolk for four years, and then on Washington Street in Petersburg. Duncan transferred to the South Carolina Conference in 1875 when he moved to that state to become a professor of philosophy at Wofford College. He was a delegate to the Ecumenical Methodist Conference in 1881 in London, as well as the later conference in 1891.

William Wallace Duncan married Medora/Madora Rice of Union, South Carolina, on March 19, 1861, and they had one son and two daughters. Bishop Duncan died on March 2, 1908, in Spartanburg, South Carolina, where he is also buried.

== Bibliography ==
- J. C. Kilgo, An Appreciation, 1908.

== See also ==
- List of bishops of the United Methodist Church
