= Elias Gabriel Galvan =

Mexican-American bishop

Elias Gabriel Galvan (born 9 April 1938) is a Mexican-American former Bishop of the United Methodist Church, elected in 1984.

== Birth and family ==
Galvan was born into a Methodist parsonage in San Juan Acozac, Puebla, Mexico. Elias married Zoraida Freytes (a native of Puerto Rico, also raised in a United Methodist parsonage) 12 July 1986. They have one daughter, Hope, born 20 September 1988.

== Education ==
Galvan attended high school at the Instituteo Mexicano Madero in Puebla, a Methodist boarding school. On a scholarship from the Spanish-American Institute, a United Methodist institution related to the (former) Southern California-Arizona Annual Conference, he attended Compton Junior College, later earning a B.A. degree from California State University at Long Beach. He then earned a Rel.D. degree at the School of Theology at Claremont.

== Ordained ministry ==
Galvan was ordained a deacon and became a Probationary Member of the Southern California-Arizona Conference of the Methodist Church in 1964. He was received into Full Connection and ordained an elder in 1970. As a pastor, Galvan served the following appointments in the Southern California-Arizona Conference: Asbury Church (associate) and as pastor of the City Terrace Church, and of the Church of All Nations in Los Angeles. He then served as director of ethnic planning and strategy (1971–74). He then was appointed superintendent of the Santa Barbara District (1974–79, also serving two years as dean of the cabinet). He became the conference council director in 1980, which position he held until elected to the episcopacy in 1984.

== Ministry in the greater Church ==
Galvan was elected a delegate to U.M. General and Jurisdictional Conferences, 1972-84 (serving as chairperson of one of the Legislative Committees in 1972). He served on the General Commission on Religion and Race (1972–76), the General Council on Finance and Administration (1976–84; chairing the council's Division on Administrative Services, 1980–84). During 1983-84 Galvan served as president of the Southern California Ecumenical Council. He has also been very active in the Hispanic Caucus of the former Pacific and Southwest Annual Conference, and of the M.A.R.C.H.A. national U.M. Hispanic caucus, of which he was the first chairperson of its coordinating committee.

== Episcopal ministry ==
Galvan was elected bishop by the Western Jurisdictional Conference of the U.M. Church. He was assigned to the Phoenix Episcopal Area (Desert Southwest Annual Conference), which was formed by the Jurisdiction in 1984. He was succeeded by Bishop William W. Dew Jr in 1992.

As a bishop he served on the General Council on Ministries (1984–88), the General Board of Discipleship (1989–92), the General Board of Global Ministries (1992-2000), and President of the College of Bishops of the Western Jurisdiction in 1989. He has also served as a trustee of the School of Theology at Claremont (1985- ). Bishop Galvan was also appointed by the Council of Bishops to chair the Committee to Develop a National Plan for Hispanic Ministries for the 1989-92 quadrennium.

Galvan retired from the active episcopacy 1 September 2004.

== See also ==
- List of bishops of the United Methodist Church
