= John Cowper Granbery =

American Confederare chaplain

- Born: December 5, 1829; Norfolk, Virginia
- Died: April 1, 1907 (aged 77); Ashland, Virginia
- Education: Randolph-Macon College
- Occupations: Clergyman, university professor
- Spouses: Jenny Massie; Ella Winston
- Children: 9
- Military career
- Allegiance: Confederate States of America (1861–1865)
- Branch: Confederate States Army
- Service years: 1861–1865
- Rank: Chaplain (CSA)

John Cowper Granbery (1829–1907) was an American Confederate chaplain and bishop of the Southern Methodist Episcopal church.

== Early life ==
John Cowper Granbery was born on December 5, 1829, in Norfolk, Virginia. He graduated from Randolph-Macon College in 1848.

== Career ==
Granbery entered the Methodist ministry and served in various pastoral roles in Farmville (1849-1850), Third Street Church in Lynchburg (1850-1852), Charlottesville (1856-1857), and Washington (1857-1859) before the outbreak of the Civil War. He later served at Market Street Church in Petersburg (1865-1868) and at Centenary Church (1868-1871) & Broad Street Church (1872-1875) in Richmond after the war had ended.

He was a chaplain on the campus of the University of Virginia from 1859 to 1861. During the American Civil War of 1861–1865, Granberry served as a chaplain in the Confederate States Army. He was wounded in the head at the Battle of Glendale (Frazier's Farm) on June 30, 1862. He was captured and imprisoned at Fort Warren in Boston Harbor, but he was soon released in a prisoner exchange.

Granberry was a professor of moral philosophy and practical theology in Vanderbilt University from 1875 to 1882. He was elected Bishop in the Southern Methodist church in 1882. Aspects of his service as bishop included overseeing the denomination's missionary work in Brazil. His daughter Ella served as a missionary in Brazil, spending some time at the Methodist college there and eventually marrying Rev. H.C. Tucker, who oversaw the work of the American Bible Society in Brazil.

== Personal life and death ==
Granberry married Jenny Massie in 1858. They had a child. He married his second wife, Ella Winston, in 1882, and they had eight children. His daughter Ruth died at the age of 12 on Sept. 2, 1891.

John Granbery died on April 1, 1907, in Ashland, Virginia. He collapsed suddenly in his home, several months after his wife succumbed in a similar manner.

== Bibliography ==
- A Bible Dictionary (1882)
- Twelve Sermons (1896)
- Experience, The Crowning Evidence of the Christian Religion (1901)

== See also ==
- List of bishops of the United Methodist Church
