= William Walter Peele =

William Walter Peele was an American bishop of the Methodist Episcopal Church, South, and The Methodist Church, elected to said office in 1938. He also gained notability as a college professor, a pastor, and as the president of the Council of Bishops of his denomination. Bishop Peele was one of the last eight bishops elected by the M.E. Church, South (at the final General Conference of this denomination).

== Birth and family ==
William, known as Walter, was born 26 November 1881 near Gibson, North Carolina (near the border with South Carolina), the fourth son of Andrew H. Peele (1850-1914) and Nora Jane (née Gibson) Peele (1856-1936).

In 1911 Peele married Elizabeth Lytch of Laurinburg, North Carolina. The couple had no children.

== Education ==
Peele attended Gibson High School. He then attended Trinity College (now Duke University), where he earned the B.A. degree in 1903 and was elected Phi Beta Kappa. He was also awarded the honorary degree of D.D. in 1928.

== Ordained and academic ministries and military service ==
Upon college graduation, Peele began a career in teaching as a professor of mathematics at Rutherford College in Conoly Springs. In 1906 at the age of twenty-five he became president of Rutherford College, remaining in this position until 1909.

Also in 1906 Peele was ordained to the ministry of the M.E. Church, South. In 1909 he was appointed pastor of St. John's Methodist Church near his hometown of Gibson. Following St. John's, Peele was appointed to the Aberdeen-Biscoe Charge. In 1915 the Rev. Peele became the headmaster of the Trinity Park School in Durham, North Carolina, the preparatory school of Trinity College. He remained in this position until 1918. He entered Officers Training School at Plattsburgh, New York, during World War I. Shortly before doing so he became Professor of Biblical Literature at Duke University. Following the war he returned to Duke as Acting Dean.

In 1918 the Rev. Peele also accepted the pastorate of the Edenton Street United Methodist Church in Raleigh, North Carolina, remaining five years. In 1923 he was appointed to Trinity Methodist Church in Durham. In 1928 Peele transferred his conference membership to the Western North Carolina Annual Conference, being appointed pastor of the First Methodist Church of Charlotte. In 1937 he became superintendent of the Greensboro District of that conference, serving until 1938.

== Episcopal ministry ==
William Walter Peele was elected a bishop of the M.E. Church, S. at the 1938 General Conference meeting in Birmingham, Alabama, one of eight bishops elected at that final General Conference of this denomination. He served at-large, as did the M.E.C.,S. bishops.

When Methodist reunion took place in 1939, Bishop Peele was assigned the Richmond episcopal area, which at that time included 56 eastern counties of Virginia and North Carolina. He also spent a year as the president of the Council of Bishops of The Methodist Church.

Bishop Peele served as the Vice-President of the Board of Foreign Missions, and as Chairman of the Commission on Army and Navy Chaplains, of the Commission on Camp Activities, and of the Methodist Commission on Overseas Relief. He also served as the President of the North Carolina Council of Churches.

== Historical assessment ==
Author Grady L.E. Carroll wrote this about Bishop Peele:

None of the high honors that came to him caused him to lose the "common touch" which he prized so high. Bishop Peele never forgot the sacrifices his parents made to educate their large family. He never lost his deep sense of humility and gratitude for the opportunities he received, to serve God and his fellow-man.

== Retirement, death and burial ==
Bishop Peele retired at the 1952 meeting of the Southeastern Jurisdictional Conference of The Methodist Church. He made his retirement home on X-Way Road near Rockdale in Scotland County, North Carolina.

Bishop William Walter Peele died 1 July 1959 and was buried in his wife's family's Lytch Cemetery in Laurinburg, North Carolina.

== See also ==
- List of bishops of the United Methodist Church
