= Mary Virginia Taylor =

Mary Virginia Taylor (born March 3, 1950) is a retired bishop in the United Methodist Church in the US who served the Holston Conference. She was elected in 2004 on the 34th ballot, receiving 354 of 549 votes cast at the Southeastern Jurisdictional Conference. She was endorsed by the Holston Conference delegation. From 2004 to 2012 Taylor served the South Carolina Conference. In 2012, Taylor was appointed to serve the Holston Annual Conference, beginning her service on September 1, 2012.

She is married to James Russell "Rusty" Taylor, an elder in the South Carolina Conference, and has two daughters, Mandy Taylor Young, and Mary Tiffany Taylor, and one granddaughter (born September 18, 2009).

Ordained deacon 1974 and ordained elder 1976 in the Holston Annual Conference, "Dindy", as she is sometimes known, served at churches in Athens, Knoxville, Gray, Bluff City, Kingsport, and Chattanooga, Tennessee, before being appointed Cleveland District Superintendent.

== See also ==
- List of bishops of the United Methodist Church
