= Beverly J. Shamana =

African-American Methodist bishop (1939–2021)

Beverly J. Shamana (November 4, 1939 – August 1, 2021) was a bishop in The United Methodist Church, elected and consecrated to the Episcopacy in 2000. She was the second African American woman elevated to the position of bishop within the United Methodist Church.

== Early life and education ==
Beverly J. Martin was born on November 4, 1939, in Los Angeles, California, the eldest of four children born to Sylvester and Charlene Martin. She was raised in Pasadena, where she studied music in school. She graduated from Occidental College with a B.A. in choral conducting and music education in 1961. She spent several years teaching music and chorale in schools in the Los Angeles area. While teaching school, she also directed church choirs. She later founded her own business making and selling knitting machines.

== Ordained ministry ==
Shamana was active in the Methodist church throughout her life. She became the executive secretary for the UMC Pacific and Southwest Conference's Commission on the Status and Role of Women in the 1970s. She then decided to pursue ordained ministry. She became an ordained deacon in 1979. The following year she completed her Master of Divinity degree from Garrett-Evangelical Theological Seminary (1980). She pastored Faith UMC in Los Angeles from 1980 to 1984, and was ordained an elder in 1984.

From 1984 to 1989, she was the pastor at Inglewood UMC in Inglewood, California. She then moved from serving in a local congregation to working again at the conference level, when she became the associate council director for the Council on Ministries. Her focus was on Ethnic, Justice, and Outreach Ministries. She served in that role from 1989 until July 2000.

Shamana was elected as a bishop in the UMC's General Convention in July 2000. She became the bishop for the San Francisco region for the United Methodist Church, serving from 2000 to 2008, when she retired. In 2001, she authored a book, Seeing in the Dark, A Vision of Creativity and Spirituality, which was published by Abingdon Press.

== Personal life and death ==
Shamana married Walter Woods in 2002. A previous marriage ended in divorce. She changed her last name from Anderson (her first married name) to Shamana in the 1970s.

Shamana died from complications related to Parkinson's disease, on August 1, 2021.

== See also ==
- List of bishops of the United Methodist Church
- Leontine T. Kelly
