= L. O. Hartman =

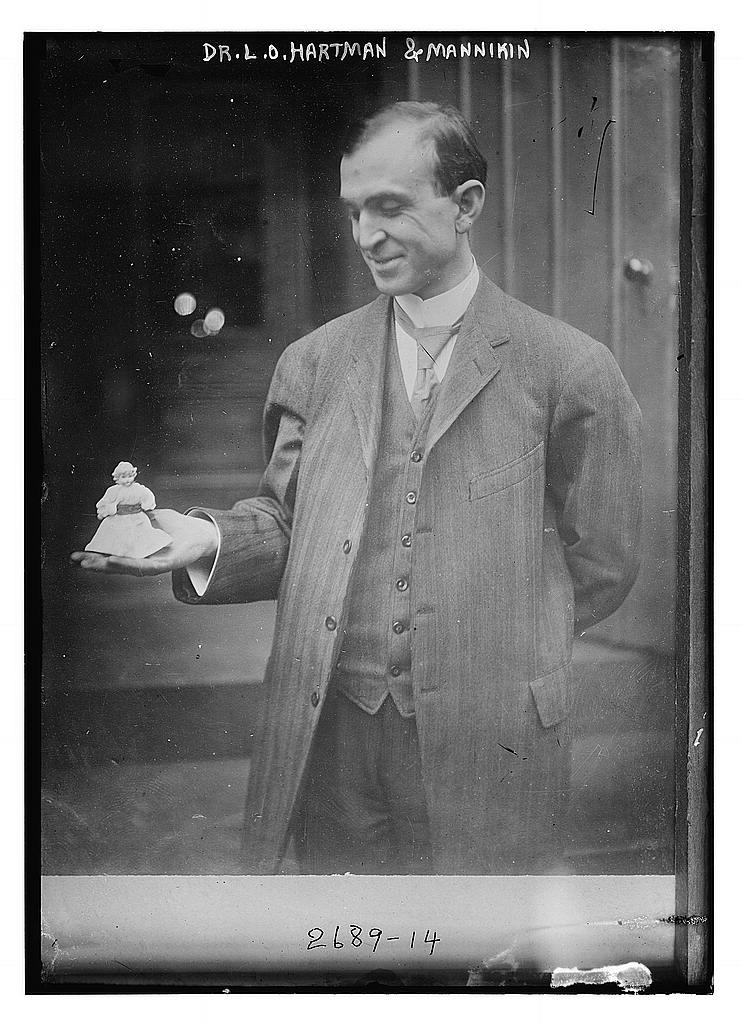
Lewis Oliver Hartman in 1913

Lewis Oliver Hartman (May 3, 1876 – June 30, 1955) was an American bishop of The Methodist Church, elected in 1944.

== Biography ==
He was born in LaGrange, Indiana. Lewis married Helen Marion Nutter December 21, 1922, in Newton, Massachusetts. She was born November 2, 1894.

Lewis entered the traveling ministry of the Cincinnati Annual Conference of the M.E. Church in 1903. Prior to his election to the episcopacy in 1944, he served as a pastor, secretary for Sunday schools, and an editor. He was editor of Zion's Herald for twenty-four years.

He was for a time the chairman of the General Conference Commission on Central Conferences. He was president of the Methodist Federation for Social Service. He also participated in ecumenical Methodist conferences.

As bishop he was assigned the Boston episcopal area, 1944–1948.

Hartman died June 30, 1955, at a hospital in Boston.

== Selected writings ==
- Louis O. Hartman to Rev. Soon Hyun (1917)
- Popular Aspects of Oriental Religions (1917)

== See also ==
- List of bishops of the United Methodist Church
