= Federico José Pagura =

Argentine religious leader and human rights activist

Frederico Jose Pagura
- Bishop
- Church: Evangelical Methodist Church of Argentina
- In office: 1977–1989

Orders
- Ordination: 1950

Personal details
- Born: February 9, 1923 Arroyo Seco, Santa Fe, Argentina
- Died: June 6, 2016 (aged 93) Rosario, Santa Fe, Argentina
- Buried: Rosario, Santa Fe, Argentina
- Residence: Rosario, Santa Fe, Argentina
- Occupation: religious leader

Federico José Pagura (February 9, 1923 – June 6, 2016) was an Argentine religious leader and champion of human rights. He was born on February 9, 1923, in Arroyo Seco, Santa Fe, Argentina. Converted to Methodism in his adolescence, became a normal school teacher and graduated from the Facultad Evangélica de Teología in Buenos Aires. He did post-graduate studies in the United States and was ordained a Methodist pastor in 1950.

Pagura was elected bishop at the final session of the Latin America Central Conference of the United Methodist Church in 1969 and served as Methodist bishop of Costa Rica and Panama until 1973. Returning to Argentina and to seminary teaching, he distinguished himself as a champion of human rights and ecumenism. Pagura served as president of the Latin American Council of Churches (1972–92). He helped refugees from the political persecution in Chile after the 1973 coup that brought Augusto Pinochet to power. He was subsequently one of the founders of the Ecumenical Movement for Human Rights in 1976. During the Argentine dictatorship (1976-1983), Bishop Pagura joined in the silent vigils of the Mothers of the Plaza de Mayo to protest the abduction of thousands of children.

Pagura was elected Bishop of The Evangelical Methodist Church of Argentina and served from 1977 to 1989. In 1998, he was elected to a six-year term as one of 10 co-presidents of the World Council of Churches. He has retained the title of Methodist Bishop Emeritus.

Interested in poetry and music since his adolescence, he was the president of the editorial committee which published in 1962 an interdenominational hymnal, Cántico Nuevo, for which he contributed 77 Spanish translations of hymns together with 5 original hymns. He has many written positive tangos, as opposed the fatalistalism characteristic of the genre, which speak of life and the Gospel, such as the tango Tenemos Esperanza (1979), which is emblematic of the trend among Argentine Christians to adapt popular music for religious purposes.

In 2003, the Argentine Congress included Bishop Pagura in their list of "Most Noteworthy" of the country.

He died on 6 June 2016 at the age of 93.

== See also ==
- List of bishops of the United Methodist Church
