= Sante Uberto Barbieri =

Sante Uberto Barbieri was a bishop of the Methodist Church, elected in 1949. A native of Italy, he was elected Bishop by the Latin American Central Conference of the Church. He was assigned the work of the Church in Argentina, Bolivia and Uruguay.

Barbieri held bachelor's, master's and divinity degrees from Southern Methodist University. He also held a master's degree from Emory University. Prior to his election to the episcopacy, Rev. Barbieri served in Brazil and Argentina. In 1954 Bishop Barbieri also was one of six presidents elected to seven-year terms in the World Council of Churches.

== Life ==
Bishop Sante Uberto Barbieri was born in Dueville, province of Vicenza, North of Italy, in 1902. His parents were Sante Barbieri and María Luigia Zanzotto. In his childhood he lived in Switzerland and in Germany; when he was 9 years old, his parents moved to Brazil. There he attended elementary and high school. His passion for freedom guided him to get in touch with the Methodists. When he was 20 years old, he joined the Methodist Church as one of its members, in Passo Fundo, RGS.

In 1923 at the tie of the Meeting of the Annual Conference of the Methodist Church, he was accepted as pastor of the Annual Conference of the Southern Methodist Church in Brazil. In 1924 he married Odette de Oliveira, from Minas Gerais; they became the parents of four children: 1 daughter and 3 sons. The same year he married Ms. de Oliveira, he started studies at the Theological Methodist Seminary in Porto Alegre, Brazil. In 1929, in company of his wife and his two elder children, he travelled to the US for postgraduate studies at the So. Methodist University of Dallas, TX and at Emory University, Atlanta, GA, obtaining B.A., MA. and B.D. degrees. In addition to the academic degrees he obtained at the mentioned Universities, he was awarded with the Distinguished Alumni Award and the LLD Honorary degrees from the Southern Methodist University as well as Doctor of Human Letters Honorary degree by Emory University. He returned to Brazil in 1933 where he was appointed pastor of the Central Methodist Church in Porto Alegre as well as Professor and Dean of the Theological Methodist Seminary of Southern Brazil in the same city, and afterwards, when the Seminary was transferred, to Passo Fundo.

In 1939 he was transferred to the River Plate region (Argentina and Uruguay) to teach at the Theological Seminary in the city of Buenos Aires. In 1942 he was appointed pastor of the Central Methodist Church of Buenos Aires; in 1948 he was elected as Dean of the Methodist Seminary of Buenos Aires, Argentina. He was elected Bishop of the Methodist Church by the Latin American Central Conference, celebrated in Buenos Aires, in 1949. As his Bishop, he had to supervise the religious Methodist undertaking in 3 Latin American countries: Argentina, Bolivia and Uruguay; so he frequently travelled from one church to another all over that vast region of Latin America. He was re-elected Bishop for four consecutive 4-year periods. He was invited by the Council of Bishops of the United Methodist Church to continue to exercising the Episcopal activity for another year. After that, he was appointed the Bishop of the Methodist Church in Peru.

Between 1969 and 1973 he presided over the organization of the Methodist Churches in Argentina, Bolivia, Costa Rica, Panama, Peru and Uruguay to become autonomous Methodist Churches. Due to his Episcopal work in Bolivia for so many years, the Bolivian Government awarded him with "The Order of the Condor of Los Andes" in Cochabamba in 1969.

Bishop Barbieri was Vice President of the World Churches of Christian Education and Sunday School from NY until its fusion with the World Council of Churches. He was also President of the First Assembly of the Protestant Churches of Latin America (1949). He served as Chaplain to the Meetings of the enlarged Committee of the International Missionary Council at Willingen, Germany, in 1952. He also attended many ecumenical and missionary Assemblies as Delegate as well as delivering lectures at Colleges and Universities, mainly in the United States.

In 1950 he delivered lectures at the Southern Methodist University, Dallas, TX at Randolph Macon College, Ashland, VA and at the Union Theological Seminary in Cuba. At the Assembly of the World Council of Churches which met in Evanston, Illinois in 1954, he was elected one of the six Presidents of the World Council of Churches. Bishop Barbieri was the first Latin American man elected to fulfil this great responsibility. It was a job he held till the Third Assembly met in India in 1961. At this Assembly, he was elected as a member of the executive committee and of the Central Committee of the World Council of Churches until 1968. In connection with this work, he travelled a great deal all over the five continents, preaching and lecturing. He was one of the pioneers from Latin America to open the road for other Latin Americans to participate actively in the mission of the World Council of Churches. The Central Office of the World Council of Churches has his headquarters at Geneva, Switzerland.

In 1969 Bishop Barbieri presided the First Sessions of Delegates from the Methodist Churches in Latin America to constitute the Council of Evangelical Methodist Churches in Latin America (Consejo de Iglesias Evangélicas Metodistas de América Latina). At this time, he was elected its First Executive Secretary, a post he served in until 1978.

Since 1938, Bishop Barbieri was a member of the Academy of Letters of Rio Grande, Brazil. Up to 1983, he wrote about 45 volumes of Christian commentaries, poetry, drama and religious stories in Portuguese, Spanish, Italian and English. Among his literary works in English, it is worth mentioning: "Spiritual currents in Latin America" and "Land of El Dorado". A group of Brazilian friends interested in Bishop Barbieri's literary works, created in 1978 the "Sante Uberto Barbieri Editorial Fund" with the intention of publishing his books. The first one published was Coloquios Intimos which was inspired by the Gospel of Mark; it contains 365 devotional poems. It as published in Portuguese and in Spanish.

In April 1982 he was awarded "The 1982 Upper Room Citation" at a ceremony which took place at the Central Methodist Church of Porto Alegre, Brazil. At that occasion, the "Anthology of Poems and Prose" was launched in English. The publication is available in Spanish, too.

He retired as an active Bishop in 1970, but his spiritual activity never ended. Afterwards he dedicated himself to lecturing, preaching and writing. In 1987 he received an award for his participation in a poetical contest in his own country. He presented a handful of poems under the title of "Pinceladas Poéticas".

His first wife, Odette de Oliveira died on July 24, 1983. On August 3, 1984, Bishop Barbieri married Delina Diaz, former Deaconess of the Methodist Church in Argentina and his devoted secretary for more than 50 years, who accompanied him till February 13, 1991, when he was called to the Eternal Life by God, his Master and Savior. Bishop Barbieri fixed his residence at Ciudad Jardín Lomas del Palomar in the province of Buenos Aires, Argentina, since 1953. His three sons are: Stelvio (Buenos Aires), Livio (Los Angeles, CA) and Flavio (Porto Alegre, Brasil). His only daughter, Laura, died July 2, 1989. At the time he died, Dr. Barbieri had 14 grandchildren and 12 great-grandchildren.

== See also ==
- List of bishops of the United Methodist Church
