= Andrew Zeller =

American 19th-century priest

Andrew Zeller was the fifth Bishop of the Church of the United Brethren in Christ. He was elected to this high office in 1817. He was an important figure in the early history of his denomination and a pioneer in the history of Pennsylvania and the United States.

== Birth and early years ==
Andrew was born in Pennsylvania in 1755. We know very little of his early life. He resided in Berks County, in Eastern Pennsylvania. He was raised on a farm, and would have been familiar with the duties and trials of a farmer's life, which in that day were not few. His education would have been very limited, comprising a knowledge of but the simplest branches.

Zeller was known to often repeat the following story from his early boyhood:

There were six boys in his father's family. They lived in a new country, which had to be prepared for the plow before it could yield an abundant harvest. It is altogether probable that, with so large a family to look after, the members of it had only the plainest of food. They resided near the banks of a little stream called the Swatara, which the boys called the Sweet Arrow. These boys would at times gather around a large dish of soup, which was the only article of diet for that meal, and with no other utensils for eating but iron spoons. With these each did his best to satisfy the demands of a strong appetite. They had already learned the art of comparing their dish with the stream near them, and, as they were rapidly emptying their dish, they would occasionally measure its depth with their spoons, and say, "The Sweet Arrow is so deep," conscious of the fact that, as the depth diminished, their pleasure was lessened.

== See also ==
- List of bishops of the United Methodist Church
