= William Perry Eveland =

American bishop (1864–1916)

William Perry Eveland (12 February 1864 – 24 July 1916) was an American missionary bishop of the Methodist Episcopal Church, elected in 1912 and serving in the U.S. and in Southeast Asia.

He was born 12 February 1864 in Harrisburg, Pennsylvania. He began a preaching ministry in 1888, joining the traveling ministry of the Central Pennsylvania Annual Conference of the M.E. Church in 1891. He graduated from Dickinson College, Carlisle, Pennsylvania in 1892.

Prior to his election to the episcopacy, he served as a pastor and an educator. He served as the president of Methodist-related Williamsport Dickinson Seminary (now, Lycoming College) from 1905 to 1912. He was appointed as missionary bishop over Southeastern Asia. However, his service as a bishop was short: he died on 24 July 1916 following an electrical accident at Mount Holly Springs, Pennsylvania, where he is also buried.

== Selected writings ==
- Inaugural Address, Williamsport Dickinson, pamphlet, 16 pp., 1908.

== See also ==
- List of bishops of the United Methodist Church
