= Homer Ellis Finger Jr. =

American Methodist bishop

Homer Ellis Finger Jr. (8 October 1916 – 25 May 2008) was an American bishop of The Methodist Church and the United Methodist Church, elected in 1964.

Finger served as bishop in Tennessee for twenty years: twelve in the Nashville Area and eight in the Holston Area (based in Knoxville). He also served as president of the Council of Bishops from 1980 to 1981, retiring from active service in 1984, but continuing on as administrative assistant secretary to the council for the next 12 years.

Prior to his election to the episcopacy, Finger served for twelve years as President of Millsaps College (1952–1964) in Jackson, Mississippi, from which he had graduated before receiving his master of divinity degree from Yale Divinity School. He also served as pastor of the Coldwater, Mississippi and Oxford University United Methodist churches, and as a Navy chaplain for three years during World War II.

== See also ==
- List of bishops of the United Methodist Church
