= Violet L. Fisher =

American Methodist bishop (1939–2025)

Violet L. Fisher (August 28, 1939 – November 17, 2025) was an American bishop in the United Methodist Church, elected and consecrated to the Episcopacy in 2000.

== Biography ==
Born August 28, 1939, she graduated from Bowie State University with a BS in 1962. She received a M. Ed. from George Washington University in 1978. She attained a D. D., Baltimore College of Bible in 1984 and also received an M. Div., Eastern Baptist Theological Seminary in 1988.

Violet Fisher had one son, Marcus. She taught in public schools in Virginia and Maryland as an English Teacher for 22 years. She was the first African-American woman to be elected to the episcopacy in the Northeast Jurisdiction of the United Methodist Church. She served as Bishop of the Western and North Central New York Annual Conference from 2000 to 2008.

Fisher died on November 17, 2025, at the age of 86.

She is survied by her Son, Marcus Fisher-Cassidy

== Ordained ministry ==
- Ordained Elder in Full Connection, King's Apostle Holiness Church of God Conference, Inc., 1965
- Appointed National Evangelist Northeastern Region, King's Apostle Holiness Church of God Conference, Inc., 1975
- Ordained Deacon, Eastern Pennsylvania Conference, United Methodist Church, 1988
- Associate Pastor St. Daniel's UMC, Chester, PA, 1988–90
- Ordained Elder in Full Connection, Eastern Pennsylvania Conference, 1990
- Pastor Sayer's Memorial UMC, Philadelphia, PA, 1990–94
- District Superintendent, Eastern Pennsylvania Conference, (served as Dean of the Cabinet (1998-1999))Mary McLeod Bethune District, 1994–2000
- Bishop of the New York West Area, 2000–2008

== Sources ==
- The Council of Bishops of the United Methodist Church
- InfoServ, the official information service of The United Methodist Church.

== See also ==
- List of bishops of the United Methodist Church
