= Chih Ping Wang =

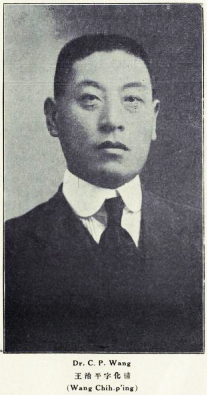
Photograph of Chih Ping Wang

Wang, Chih Ping (Wang, Hua-Ching) (Chinese: 王治平; Given name: 王化清; 6 July 1878 – 22 February 1964) was the first Chinese Bishop in China of the United Methodist Church, elected in 1930.

== Birth and family ==
He was born on July 6, 1878, and died in Beijing on February 22, 1964, due to illness. His grandfather moved the family from Shaoxing in Zhejiang Province to Beijing and lived there since. His grandfather had four children and his father was the fourth child born in Beijing. Both his grandfather and his father worked as officers for the Qing Government. His mother's ancestral hometown was also Shaoxing. His younger brother, Wang, Chih He (Chinese: 王治和；Given name: 赞清) was four years younger than him. Their father died while they were still in their young ages. After growing up, they first took lessons from old style of private studies. Thereafter, their Chinese teacher, Mr. Lu, introduced them to the Methodist University. Soon after, they became Christians along with their mother.

== Biography ==
Wang, Chih Ping graduated from Peking Methodist University in 1899 and married Hao, Jinying in the following year. His family lived in Changping, Beijing for many years. She was a graduate from Muzhen Girls School. In the fall of 1901, he was appointed as a pastor for about a year at the Methodist Church at Funing County (near Shan Hai Guan) in Hebei Province. Thereafter, he became the principal of the Elementary School of West Street Church at Shan Hai Guan (a district of Qinhuangdao City, Hebei Province), as well as a teacher taught Math, English, Bible Study. From the fall of 1908 to the summer of 1914, Wang Chih Ping was a history teacher at Peking Methodist University. From the fall of 1914 to the summer of 1917, he studied at Syracuse University and received his PhD and served as a professor of Chinese Modern History. 1919 Fall – 1926 Fall, the general officer of YMCA in Tianjin. 1926 Fall – 1930 Spring, principle pastor at Beijing Asbury Church. 1930 Spring, the first Chinese Bishop of the Methodist Church at Nanjing. As a Methodist church Bishop, his work was spread over many places across China and travelling frequently. Exhausting work forced him retired before he reached to sixty. He lived between Beijing and Tianjin during his retired years. Wang, Chih Ping died from illness in February, 1964. His wife, Hao, Jinying died from illness in May, 1969.

== See also ==
- List of bishops of the United Methodist Church
