= Frederick Buckley Newell =

- Elected: 1952

Orders
- Ordination: 1917

Personal details
- Born: March 11, 1890 Hartford, Connecticut
- Died: August 12, 1979 (aged 89) Groton, Connecticut
- Buried: Hartford, Connecticut
- Denomination: The Methodist Church
- Spouse: Emily Louise Lewis
- Children: Frederick Buckley Newell Jr, and Eleanor
- Education: Wesleyan University
- Alma mater: Columbia University

Frederick Buckley Newell (11 March 1890 - 12 August 1979) was an American bishop of The Methodist Church, elected in 1952.

== Birth and family ==
Frederick was born 11 March 1890 in Hartford, Connecticut. He married Emily Louise Lewis of Jersey City, New Jersey 15 January 1919. They had two children: Frederick Buckley Newell Jr, and Eleanor (Mrs. K.W. Steere).

== Education ==
Frederick earned his A.B. degree from Wesleyan University, Middletown, Connecticut in 1913. He earned an M.A. degree from Columbia University, New York City in 1916. He earned his Bachelor of Divinity degree from Union Theological Seminary in New York also in 1916.

== Honorary degrees ==
The Rev. Newell was honored with the D.D. degree from Mount Union College, Alliance, Ohio in 1931. He also received a D.D. from Wesleyan University in 1938. American University, Washington, D.C. honored Bishop Newell with the degree LL.D. in 1955. He received this same honorary doctorate (LL.D.) from Syracuse University, Syracuse, New York in 1957.

== Ordained ministry ==
Frederick was ordained deacon in the New York East Annual Conference of the Methodist Episcopal Church in 1917. He was ordained elder in the same in 1919. He served as the pastor of the People's Home Church and Settlement, New York City (1917–20). He was then appointed the assistant executive secretary of the New York City Society of the Methodist Church (1920–30), and the executive secretary of the same (1930–52).

Rev. Newell was elected a delegate to the 1939 Uniting Conference of Methodism (having served as the chairman of the Commission on Church Union), as well as to the quadrennial General and Jurisdictional Conferences of The Methodist Church (1940–52).

== Death ==
Rev. Dr. Newell died in Groton, Connecticut, on Sunday, August 12, 1979, at the age of 89. His body was committed August 16, 1979, in Cedar Hill Cemetery in Hartford, Connecticut.

== See also ==
- List of bishops of the United Methodist Church
