= James Newbury FitzGerald =

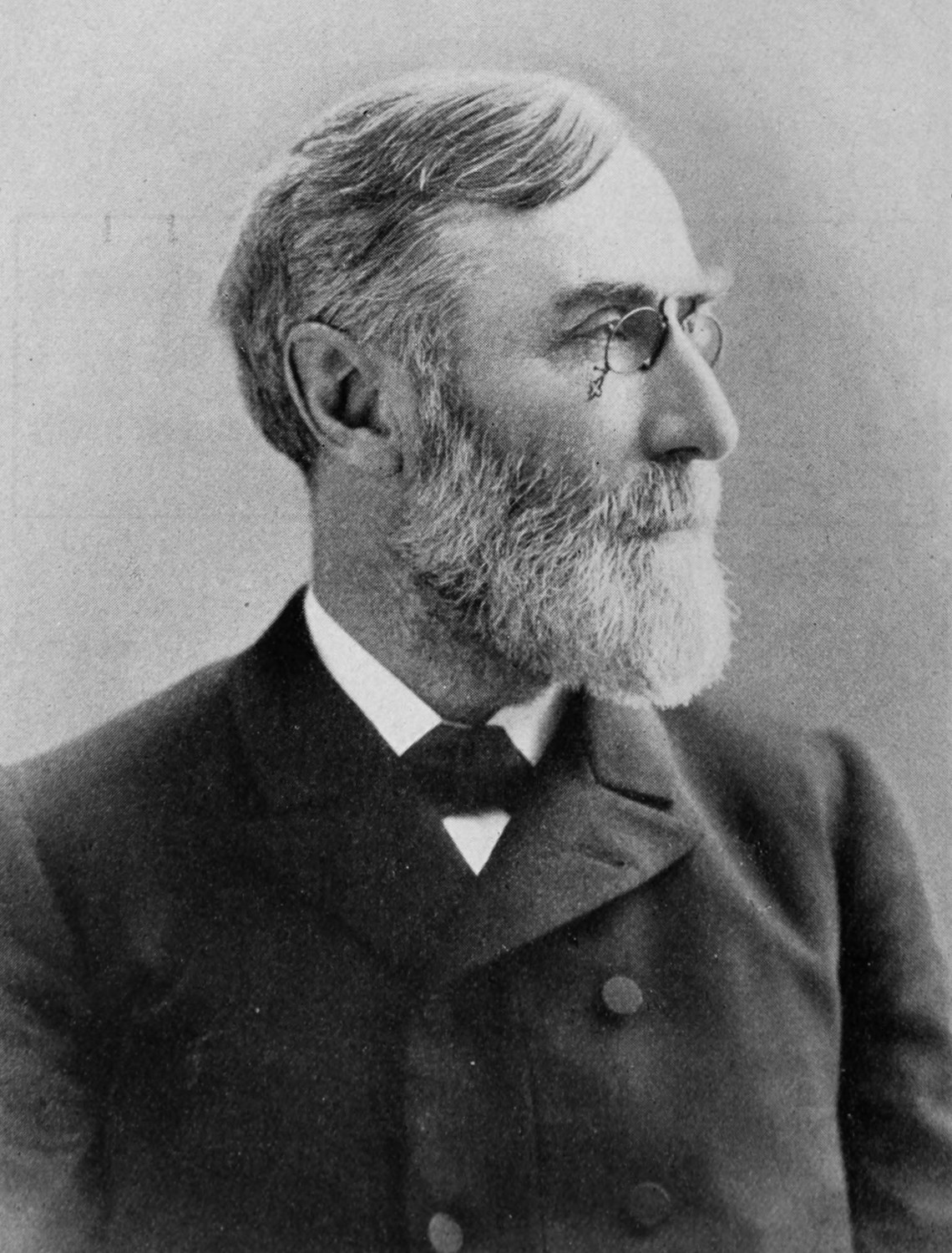

James Newbury FitzGerald (1837–1907) was an American bishop of the Methodist Episcopal Church, elected in 1888.

== Biography ==
James Newbury FitzGerald was born at Newark, New Jersey on July 27, 1837. He received the degree of D. D. from Wesleyan University in 1880 and that of LL. D. from Hamline University in 1889.

In 1895 he made the episcopal visitation to the South American and European conferences. He died at Hong Kong on April 4, 1907, on an episcopal visitation to the Oriental mission conferences.

== See also ==
- List of bishops of the United Methodist Church
