= Joaquina Filipe Nhanala =

United Methodist Church bishop

- Church: United Methodist Church
- Province: Mozambique Episcopal Area
- Elected: July 2008

Personal details
- Born: 1957 (age 68–69)
- Education: Limuru University; Nairobi Evangelical Graduate School of Theology

Joaquina Filipe Nhanala (born 1957) is a bishop in The United Methodist Church.

Nhanala was the first woman elected bishop by the Africa Central Conference of The United Methodist Church.

Nhanala received a Bachelor of Divinity from Limuru University and a Master of Bible Studies and Theology from Nairobi Evangelical Graduate School of Theology.

Nhanala serves the Mozambique Episcopal Area. She was elected in July 2008 and took office the following September.
