= Paul William Milhouse =

Paul William Milhouse (31 August 1910, St. Francisville, Illinois - 12 March 2005, Franklin, Indiana) was an American bishop of the Evangelical United Brethren Church (E.U.B. Church), elected in 1960. When he died at the age of 94 he was the last surviving U.M. Bishop elected by the E.U.B. denomination (which merged with the Methodist Church in 1968 to form the United Methodist Church).

== Education ==
Milhouse earned his undergraduate degree from Indiana Central College in Indianapolis, Indiana. He earned divinity degrees from American Theological Seminary in Wilmington, Delaware. He later received a Doctor of Divinity degree from Indiana Central, as well.

== Episcopal ministry ==
Milhouse was elected a bishop by a special mail-in ballot in November, 1960. He spent eight years supervising E.U.B. churches in the denomination's Southwestern Area (with offices in Kansas City). In 1968 he was assigned to the Oklahoma Area of the (new) United Methodist Church (U.M.C.). He was President of the U.M.C. Council of Bishops, 1977–78. He retired in 1980.

== Ordained ministry ==
Prior to his election to the episcopacy, Milhouse was a pastor of churches in Illinois, the associate editor of the E.U.B. magazine Telescope-Messenger, and a staff executive of the E.U.B. General Council of Administration. In retirement he served as bishop-in-residence at Oklahoma City University (1980–91), and at the University of Indianapolis (1991–98).

== Death ==
When he died in 2005 he was survived by his wife, Mary Frances Noblitt Milhouse, whom he married in 1932. Two daughters also survived: Mary Catherine Hauswald and Pauline Joyce Vermillion, as did a son, Paul David Milhouse. Bishop Milhouse's sister, Dorothy Jacobs, also survived him, as did seven grandchildren and sixteen great-grandchildren.

== Selected writings ==
- Nineteen Bishops of the Evangelical United Brethren Church, Nashville, The Parthenon Press, 1974.

== See also ==
- List of bishops of the United Methodist Church
