= Lawson Bryan =

American clergyman

- Born: June 13, 1950; Quincy, Florida
- Occupation: Bishop
- Spouse: Sherrill O. Cooper
- Children: Philip Bryan

Lawson Bryan (June 13, 1950) is a United Methodist Bishop of the South Georgia Conference. He was elected July 13, 2016 to the episcopacy at the Southeastern Jurisdictional Conference quadrennial meeting at Lake Junaluska, N.C.

== Biography ==
=== Education ===
- Graduate of Dothan High School, 1968
- Bachelor of Science, cum laude, Tulane University, New Orleans, LA., 1972
- Master of Divinity, cum laude, Candler School of Theology, Emory University, Atlanta, GA, 1975
- Doctor of Ministry, Emory University, Atlanta, GA, 1985

=== Personal life ===
Married to Sherrill O. Cooper. Together they have one child, Philip Bryan.

== Published works ==
- Pursuing Science, Finding Faith (2012) 978-0-9849426-0-2

== Ordained ministry ==
Associate Pastor, Trinity UMC, Opelika, AL. 1975- 1976

Pastor, Hiland Park UMC, Panama City, FL. 1976-1980

Pastor, Dexter Avenue UMC, Montgomery, AL. 1980- 1986

Pastor, First UMC, Brewton, AL. 1986- 1990

Pastor, Ashland Place UMC, Mobile, AL. 1990-1997

Pastor, First UMC, Dothan, AL. 1997-2007

Senior Pastor, First UMC, Montgomery, AL 2007-2016
