= James Chamberlain Baker =

James Chamberlain Baker (June 2, 1879 – 1969) was an American bishop of the Methodist Episcopal Church, The Methodist Church, and the United Methodist Church, elected in 1928.

== Early life ==
James Chamberlain Baker was born on June 2, 1879, in Sheldon, Illinois. Of New England ancestry on both sides, he was a son of the Rev. Benjamin Webb Baker, a Civil War Chaplain.

== Career ==
Prior to his election to the episcopacy, Bishop Baker united with the Illinois Annual Conference of the M.E. Church in 1900. He served as an educator, a pastor, and the organizer and head of the first Wesley Foundation in the United States, at the University of Illinois.

Bishop Baker served the California Episcopal Area, which at the time included the following Annual Conferences: California, Southern California-Arizona, California Oriental Provisional, Hawaii Mission, Pacific Japanese Provisional, and Latin American Provisional.

== Personal life ==
He died in 1969.

== See also ==
- List of bishops of the United Methodist Church
