= Robert McIntyre (bishop) =

American poet

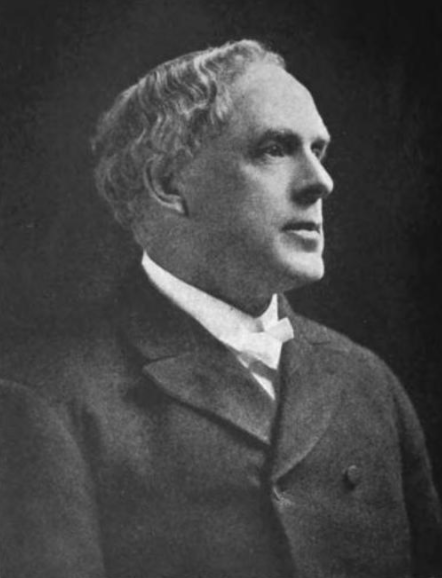
- Born: November 20, 1851; Selkirk, Scotland, U.K.
- Died: August 30, 1914 (aged 62); Chicago, Illinois, U.S.
- Education: Vanderbilt University
- Occupation: Bishop
- Employer: Methodist Episcopal Church
- Spouse: Ella Chatten
- Children: 1 son, 2 daughters

Robert McIntyre (November 20, 1851 - August 30, 1914) was a Scottish-born American clergyman. He served as a Bishop of the Methodist Episcopal Church.

== Early life ==
Robert McIntyre was born on November 20, 1851, in Selkirk, Scotland. He emigrated to the United States at the age of 7 and became an orphan shortly after. He became a bricklayer in Philadelphia and Chicago to save for his education. McIntyre graduated from Vanderbilt University.

== Career ==
McIntyre was the pastor of the Grace Methodist Church and the St James Methodist Church in Chicago; the Trinity Methodist Church in Denver; the First Methodist Church in Los Angeles, California. In 1908, he was elected as a bishop of the Methodist Episcopal Church. As Bishop, he was responsible for Oklahoma, Texas and parts of Kansas.

McIntyre authored a novel and a poetry collection. He was a lecturer at the Chautauqua Institution.

== Personal life and death ==
McIntyre married Ella Chatten. They had a son and two daughters.

McIntyre died on August 30, 1914, in Chicago.

== Works ==
- McIntyre, Robert (1899). At Early Candlelight and Other Poems. Cincinnati, Ohio: Curtis & Jennings.
- McIntyre, Robert (1901). A Modern Apollos. Cincinnati, Ohio: Jennings & Pye. OCLC 25532995.
