= Episcopal see =

Main administrative seat held by a bishop

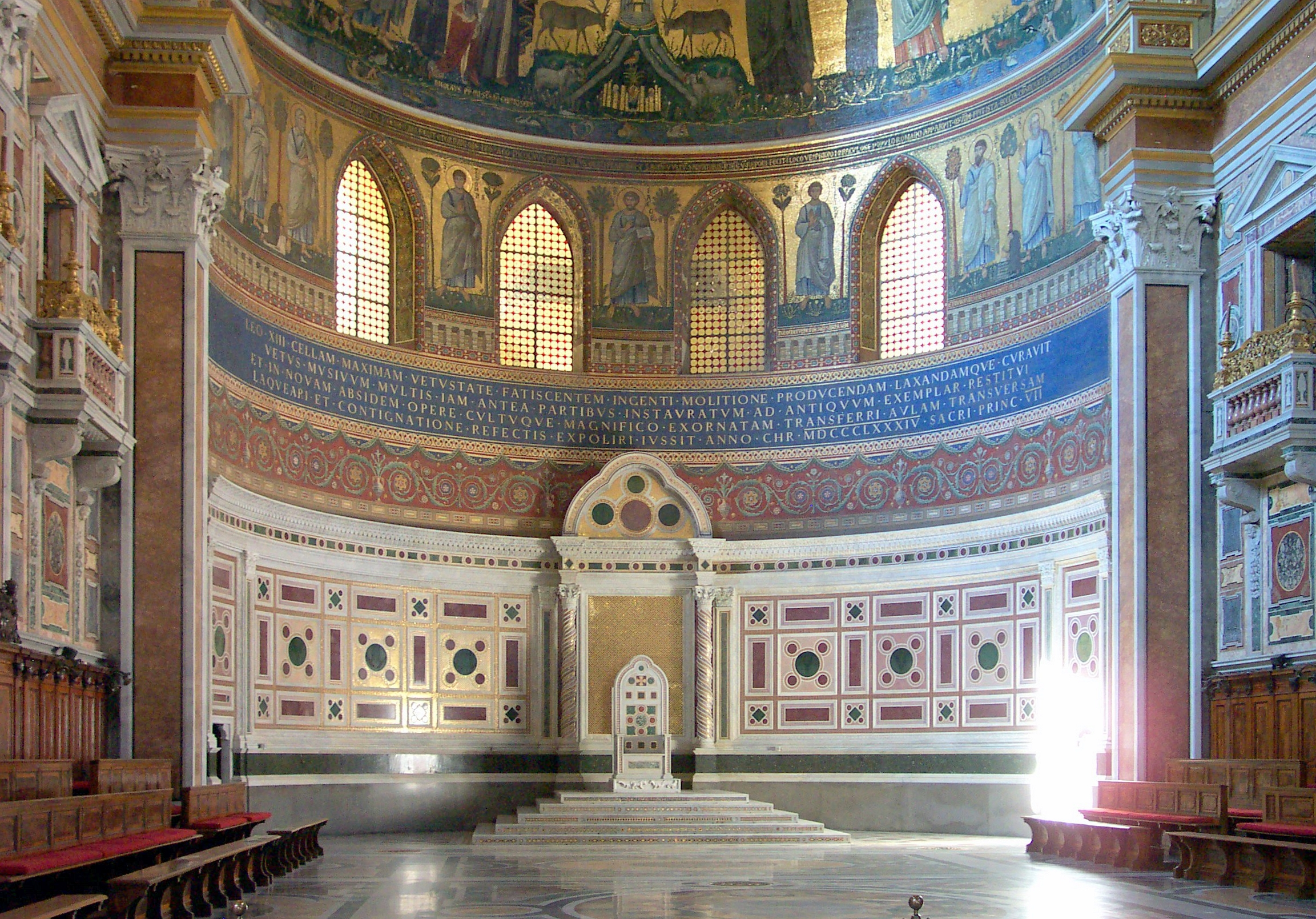
The seat or cathedra of the Bishop of Rome in the Archbasilica of Saint John Lateran

An episcopal see is the area of a bishop's ecclesiastical jurisdiction.

Phrases concerning actions occurring within or outside an episcopal see are indicative of the geographical significance of the term, making it synonymous with diocese.

The word see is derived from Latin sedes, which in its original or proper sense denotes the seat or chair that, in the case of a bishop, is the earliest symbol of the bishop's authority. This symbolic chair is also known as the bishop's cathedra. The church in which it is placed is for that reason called the bishop's cathedral, from Latin ecclesia cathedralis, meaning the 'church of the cathedra'. The word throne is also used, especially in the Eastern Orthodox Church, both for the chair and for the area of ecclesiastical jurisdiction.

The term see is also used of the town where the cathedral or the bishop's residence is located.

== Catholic Church ==
Within Catholicism, each diocese is considered to be a see unto itself with a certain allegiance to the See of Rome. The idea of a see as a sovereign entity is somewhat complicated due to the existence of the twenty-three Particular Eastern Catholic Churches. Both the Western Church and its Eastern Catholic counterparts reserve some level of autonomy, yet each also is subdivided into smaller sees (dioceses and archdioceses). The episcopal see of the Pope, the bishop of Rome, is known as "the Holy See" or "the Apostolic See", claiming papal supremacy.

== Eastern Orthodox Church ==
The Eastern Orthodox Church views all bishops as sacramentally equal, and in principle holding equal authority, each over his own see. Certain bishops may be granted additional administrative duties over wider regions (as in the idea of the Pentarchy), but these powers are limited and never extend over the entire Church. Thus, the Eastern Orthodox oppose the idea of papal supremacy or any similar supremacy by any one bishop.

== United Methodist Church ==
The United Methodist Church is divided into Annual Conferences, each one of which is presided over by a resident bishop, who is bishop of a named Episcopal Area, or See city. This is usually the Annual Conference's largest, or sometimes most centrally located, city. Annual Conferences are the regional bodies which are the fundamental basic bodies of which the United Methodist Global Connection is composed. Annual Conferences are responsible for many matters, including the approval, election and ordination of clergy, who then become members of the Annual Conference in which they are elected and ordained and – with some exceptions – serve within the bounds of for the tenure of their ministries.

United Methodist bishops are elected in larger regional conclaves every four years which are known as Jurisdictional Conferences. These super-regional Jurisdictional Conferences comprise an equal number of lay and clergy delegates from each Annual Conference, each delegation determined by the size of the Annual Conference, within the Jurisdiction, and new bishops are elected and consecrated from among the clergy of the Jurisdiction's Annual Conferences. These bishops who are elected for life, are then sent to lead the various Annual Conferences of the Jurisdiction. Episcopal candidates are usually – although not always – the first clergy delegate elected from a particular Annual Conference. Each bishop is assigned to and leads for four year terms an Episcopal area, or see, of each Annual Conference. An Episcopal area can also comprise more than one Annual Conference when two smaller Annual Conferences agree to share a bishop.

== See also ==
- Apostolic succession
- Apostolic see
- Apostolic throne
- Curule seat, Roman chair used as sign of power
- Early centers of Christianity
- Ecclesiastical province
- Episcopal polity
- Lists of popes, patriarchs, primates, archbishops, and bishops
- Sede vacante
- Titular see, inactive diocese
