= United Methodist Council of Bishops =

The United Methodist Council of Bishops is the organization of which all active and retired bishops in the United Methodist Connection are members. In the United Methodist system of polity, the Council of Bishops is the executive branch of the church's government. The bishops of the United Methodist Church, both individually and collectively through the Council of Bishops, provide spiritual leadership to more than 11 million United Methodists across North America, Europe, Africa, and Asia.

Since the founding of the Methodist Episcopal Church at the Christmas Conference in Baltimore in 1784, United Methodist bishops have helped to set the direction of the church and its mission throughout the world. The bishops preside over geographic areas of ministry, known as Annual Conferences, and supervise the appointment and ministry of each Annual Conference's clergy and the mission and ministry of each Annual Conference's congregations. Bishops are elected every four years by each of the 5 Jurisdictional Conferences in the United States and the Central Conferences outside the United States. Once elected, each bishop is consecrated to the episcopacy for life and they serve in the jurisdiction by which they were elected and consecrated. As with all United Methodist clergy itinerate within the Annual Conference of which they are members, once elected, bishops itinerate within the jurisdiction they are members of, serving a specific Annual Conference for 4 year terms. After this, they may be reappointed or moved to another Annual Conference, on the recommendation of each Jurisdictional Committee on the Episcopacy and the authority of the full Jurisdictional Conference acting on those recommendations.

Bishops are responsible for supervising the ordination and character of the clergy under their leadership, and for fixing the appointment of each clergy member of an Annual Conference each year to a particular congregation, charge, circuit or other place of ministry and mission. The bishop of each Annual Conference also presides over each session of the conference and is the executive officer of each conference. Each bishop presides over a cabinet of District Superintendents, who are the bishop's assistants who more directly supervise the ministry of clergy within each district within an Annual Conference. Districts are regionally based units within each Annual Conference, each of which is presided over by a District Superintendent (who must be an Elder in "full connection" with the Annual Conference in which they serve) and which has its own officers and structures that are accountable to the bishop and the Annual Conference for the conduct of their mission and ministry.

While the Council of Bishops is the executive branch of church government, it is ultimately the General Conference of the church which constitutes its legislative branch, and that speaks for and sets the policies, missions and ministries of the church through its authority to maintain and change the United Methodist Discipline, the book that structures and rules United Methodism. Ultimately, the General Conference speaks for the church.

== Officers of the Council of Bishops ==
Presidents, president-designates and secretaries have been elected to non-renewable two-year terms since 2004, when the term was increased from one year. The Executive Secretary and Ecumenical Officer are both elected to four-year terms.

=== List of presidents ===
- Prince Albert Taylor Jr. (1965-1966)
- Homer Ellis Finger Jr. (1980-1981)
- Emilio J. M. de Carvalho (1991-1992)
- Elias Gabriel Galvan (2001-2002)
- Sharon Brown Christopher (2002-2003, first woman elected president)
- Rüdiger Rainer Minor (2003-2004)
- Peter D. Weaver (2004-2006)
- Janice Riggle Huie (2006-2008)
- Gregory V. Palmer (2008-2010)
- Larry M. Goodpaster (2010-2012)
- Rosemarie Wenner (2012-2014, first woman from outside the United States to preside)
- Warner H. Brown, Jr. (2014-2016)
- Bruce Ough (2016-2018)
- Kenneth Carter (2018-2020)
- Cynthia Fierro-Harvey (2020-2022)
- Thomas J. Bickerton (2022-2024)
- Tracy Smith Malone (2024-2026)
- Ruben Saenz, Jr. (2026-2028)
- Mande Muyombo (2028-2030, president-designate)

== See also ==
- College of Bishops
- List of bishops of the United Methodist Church
- Synod of Bishops
