= Daniel Wandabula =

Zimbabwean methodist bishop

The Reverend Daniel Wandabula
- Bishop
- Church: United Methodist Church
- Diocese: East Africa Annual Conference
- Elected: 27 May 2006
- Installed: 28 May 2006
- Predecessor: John Alfred Ndoricimpa

Orders
- Ordination: 1994 (Elder)
- Consecration: 28 May 2006

Personal details
- Residence: East Africa
- Spouse: Betty Wandabula (m. January 2005)
- Education: Kenya Methodist University (Diploma, Practical Theology); Garrett-Evangelical Theological Seminary (M.Div., 1997; M.T.S., 1998); Asbury Theological Seminary (Doctor of Ministry, candidate)

Daniel Wandabula is a bishop of the United Methodist Church, elected in 2006. At the time of his election he was forty-one years old, one of the youngest bishops of his denomination.

== Episcopal election ==
Bishop Wandabula was elected 27 May 2006 during a meeting of the Africa Central Conference of the U.M. Church, held on the campus of the Africa University in Mutare, Zimbabwe. He was elected on only the second ballot, receiving eighty-one percent of the vote of the delegates assembled. "This was a great and historic event for the church, and you could feel it," said Bishop Eben Nhiwatiwa, leader of the denomination's Zimbabwe episcopal area, and host Bishop for the meeting. "The delegates have shown maturity, and this Bishop has been given to us by God." Caroline Njuki, an executive with the U.M. Board of Global Ministries agreed, stating "The Holy Spirit was with the delegates. An election that was expected to take a day or a day and a half was over in a matter of hours."

The election actually began in a more tumultuous way, with some delegates questioning the candidates' slate and the voting process. In the end, however, the delegates opted for an open slate and voting began. Two other nominees were the Rev. Joel Ncahoruri and the Rev. Justin Nzoyisaba, both of Burundi.

In making their choice, delegates spoke of the need for development, healing, reconciliation and unity, within the Church as well as their various, strife-torn countries. "We saw in [Daniel Wandabula] the kind of character that showed that he could be a leader to our wounded countries and conference," explained Godelive Manirakiza, a lay delegate from Burundi. "It is good to give someone from outside Burundi the opportunity to lead. It will strengthen unity and promote healing." Another lay delegate, Alice Wasilwa from Kenya agreed, stating "I am so excited in my heart because we wanted someone who is neutral, and we now have that in this leader." Bishop Jose Quipungo, the Episcopal Leader of East Angola and President of the Africa Central Conference added, "He is a man from the new generation, and he is strong."

Since the election of Bishop Daniel Wandabula, the problems of leadership that existed in that particular Annual Conference before the death of the late Bishop John Alfred Ndricimpa, persisted and worsened. As the new bishop didn't do much to heal the wounds and the already existing problems.

The church in Rwanda and in Burundi, being former Belgian colonies; the governing bodies of any religious association is The General Assembly, the Executive Committee and the Office of Legal Representation (overseer), and the people making such composition have got to be nationals (Rwandese or Burundians).

Bishop John A. Ndoricimpa, being Burundian by nationality was elected and legally acted as the Legal Representative of the UMC-Burundi, beside being the resident bishop of East Africa Annual Conference. Therefore, after his death and while Daniel Wandabula had been invested as the resident bishop of East Africa Annual Conference, UMC-Burundi elected The Reverend Nzoyisaba Justin as its new Legal Representative as the office was vacant.

For some time, bishop Daniel refused to cooperate with the Legal Representatives elected by the church and the text and constitutions that govern the church in Burundi and Rwanda. In 2007, the United Methodist Church of Rwanda in its General Assembly, which is the highest decision making body in our churches, opted for the consecration of their own bishop in order to have peace in their church. Therefore, Bishop Jupa Kaberuka was elected and consecrated as the new bishop of the United Methodist Church of Rwanda and is the Legal Representative of the church.

The church of Burundi on its side waited for the situation to heal, but it seemed to have worsened, and on December the 5-6th, 2008 the Executive Committee and the General Assembly of the United Methodist Church of Burundi met and elected the bishop of Burundi by the name of the Reverend Nzoyisaba Justin.

Bishop Justin Nzoyisaba Justin was consecrated to the episcopate on Sunday, December 7, 2008 in full apostolic succession as the new Bishop of the United Methodist Church of Burundi and he remains the Legal Representative of the Church.

== Episcopal assignment ==
Bishop Wandabula was elected as Resident Bishop for East Africa, including all U.M. Churches in Burundi, Kenya, Rwanda, Sudan, Tanzania and Uganda. He replaces the late Bishop J. Alfred Ndoricimpa who died July 2005. Bishop Wandabula was consecrated 28 May 2006 at the Ehnes Memorial Church at the Old Mutare, Zimbabwe U.M.C. Mission Center. His wife Betty (whom he married in January 2005) was with him.

== Education ==
Daniel Wandabula earned both his M.Div. (1997) and Master of Theological Studies (1998) degrees from Garrett-Evangelical Theological Seminary, Evanston, Illinois, U.S.A.. Prior to seminary, he received a diploma in practical theology from the Methodist Training Institute at Kenya Methodist University. He is also studying for a Beeson International Leaders Doctor of Ministry degree at Asbury Theological Seminary, Wilmore, Kentucky, U.S.A.

== Ordained ministry ==
The Rev. Wandabula was ordained an elder in 1994. Before going to the U.S. for graduate studies, he served as administrative secretary to the United Methodist Church in Uganda (1991–94), and as project manager for the Methodist Youth Association in Jinja, Uganda (1986–88). His most recent assignment has been as a pastor and as the former dean of superintendents and project coordinator for the Uganda/Sudan District of the East Africa Annual Conference of the U.M. Church.

== A challenging episcopacy ==
Seriously divisive issues awaited Bishop Wandabula's ministry, including those within and among the different groups, ethnic and otherwise, that made up his new field of service. Years of war—in Rwanda, south Sudan and northern Uganda in particular—had resulted in large numbers of orphans and dilapidated or destroyed infrastructure. Church members in the Area felt the great need for more trained pastors and for skilled professionals to lead development projects to help communities prosper. "East Africa is an area that is facing a lot of challenges," said Bishop Nhiwatiwa at the time. "It needs a healing spirit, and we know that our brothers and sisters there will continue to show maturity and grow with their Bishop."

Bishop Quiipungo and his fellow bishops pledged to assist and support their new colleague, noting the tremendous responsibility he faced. "He will need to be a man of courage and firm convictions, loving his people but also helping them to transcend their differences," remarked retired Bishop Emilio De Carvalho of the West Angola Conference.
