= District Conference =

In many Methodist Churches, a District Conference is a unit of church organisation with respect to hierarchy.

== Evangelical Wesleyan Church ==
In the Evangelical Wesleyan Church, district conferences are required to be held thrice a year. It is presided over by a bishop. It grants and renews licenses to preach, recommends suitable local preachers to the annual conference, recommends suitable deaconesses to the annual conference, among other responsibilities.

== Primitive Methodist Church ==
In the Primitive Methodist Church, a district superintendent presides over the district conference.

== United Methodist Church ==
In the United Methodist Church, district conferences consist of clergy from the district, as well as lay delegates from each pastoral charge. It is presided over by a District Superintendent.

== See also ==
- Conferences in Methodism
- Annual conference
- General Conference (Methodism)
