= Charge Conference =

In many Methodist Churches, the Charge Conference, also known as the Pastoral Charge, is the smallest unit of organisation with respect to the hierarchy of the denomination.

== Allegheny Wesleyan Methodist Connection ==
In the Allegheny Wesleyan Methodist Connection, the pastoral charge is responsible for receiving new members (as well as excommunicating members), calling its own pastor, granting licenses to preach, recommending local preachers to the Annual Conference, electing officers and trustees, among other tasks.

== Evangelical Wesleyan Church ==
In the Evangelical Wesleyan Church, the charge conference is presided over by the pastor of the local church. It determines the membership of that society.

== United Methodist Church ==
In the United Methodist Church, the charge conference meets at least once a year and is responsible for recommending candidates for holy orders, establishing salaries for the pastor and staff, and evaluating the ministry of that parish church.

== See also ==
- Conferences in Methodism
- Annual conferences within Methodism
- General Conference (Methodism)
