= Philippines Central Conference (United Methodist Church) =

Conference series in the Philippines

The Philippines Central Conference of the United Methodist Church (Filipino: Kumperensyang Sentral ng Pilipinas) is a collection of annual conferences of the United Methodist Church in the Philippines that are organised much like jurisdictional conferences in the United States. The Philippines Central Conference is considered a member church of the World Methodist Council, and a "Central Conference" of the world-wide United Methodist Church. It is also a member of the Christian Conference of Asia and the National Council of Churches in the Philippines as The United Methodist Church in the Philippines, representing the denomination as its Philippine counterpart.

The Philippines Central Conference is further subdivided into twenty-two (22) regions, called annual conferences, under the authorities of three episcopal areas. These annual conferences are subdivided into "districts," which provide further administrative functions for the operation of local churches in cooperation with each other under the supervision of the district superintendent. This structure is vital to Methodism, and is referred to as "connexionalism".

The Philippines Central Conference has a professing membership of about 200,540, but it serves a much larger community of close to 1 million. From six annual conferences in 1968, the United Methodist Church in the Philippines has grown to 19 annual conferences located in three episcopal areas. And now, with 24 Annual conferences.

== History ==
The first Methodist presence on the islands was that of Rev. Maj. George C. Stull, a minister from the Montana Annual Conference, which was a part of the Methodist Episcopal Church. He originally went to the Philippines as the chaplain of the First Montana Regiment, and established the first ME church. In the Stull letter—a correspondence sent from Stull to his home conference for the annual conference—Stull enumerates several of his accomplishments since coming to the islands. Among them is the fact that he commissioned the first Filipino to preach using his "elder's privilege in an emergency."

In 1908, the General Conference of the Methodist Episcopal Church authorized the organization of the Philippine Islands Mission into the Philippine Islands Annual Conference, under the jurisdiction of the Southern Asia Central Conference.

The work in the Philippines grew quickly and in 1936, the General Conference enabled the organization of the Philippines Central Conference during the following quadrennium. This act was ratified at the 1939 Uniting Conference which created The Methodist Church. The first session of the Philippines Central Conference was held at the Central Methodist Church in Manila, beginning February 29, 1940.

Following years of growth, the 1960 General Conference approved a second episcopal area in the Philippines Central Conference: the Baguio Area (composed of the Northwest Philippines Annual Conference, the Northern Philippines Annual Conference, and the Mindanao Provisional Annual Conference) which joined the Manila Area (composed of the Philippines Annual Conference, Southwest Philippines Provisional Annual Conference, and the Middle Philippines Annual Conference). The 1984 General Conference mandated the addition of a third episcopal area, the Davao Area.

In 2022 Ruby-Nell Estrella was elected as the first woman bishop of the United Methodist Church in the Philippines. (The Philippines Central Conference is also a member of the Christian Conference of Asia and the National Council of Churches in the Philippines as The United Methodist Church in the Philippines, representing the denomination as its Philippine counterpart.)

== List of Episcopal Areas ==
- Baguio Episcopal Area
- Davao Episcopal Area
- Manila Episcopal Area

== List of Annual Conferences ==
Baguio Episcopal Area

1. Central Luzon Philippines Annual Conference
2. North Central Philippines Annual Conference
3. Northeast Philippines Annual Conference
4. Northern Philippines Annual Conference
5. Northwest Philippines Annual Conference
6. Pangasinan Philippines Annual Conference
7. Hundred Islands Philippines Annual Conference
8. Tarlac Philippines Annual Conference
9. Northeast Luzon Philippines Annual Conference

Davao Episcopal Area

1. East Mindanao Philippines Annual Conference
2. Mindanao Philippines Annual Conference
3. Northwest Mindanao Philippines Annual Conference
4. Visayas Philippines Annual Conference
5. Bicol Philippines Annual Conference

Manila Episcopal Area

1. Bulacan Philippines Annual Conference
2. Middle Philippines Annual Conference
3. Palawan Philippines Annual Conference
4. Philippines Annual Conference
5. Rizal Philippines Annual Conference East
6. Pampanga Philippines Annual Conference
7. West Middle Philippines Annual Conference
8. Southwest Philippines Annual Conference
9. Cavite Philippines Annual Conference
10. Quezon City Philippines Annual Conference East
11. Southern Tagalog Philippines Provisional Annual Conference East
12. South Nueva Ecija Philippines Annual Conference

== Ministry Fellowships ==
- United Methodist Youth Fellowship (UMYF), for youth ages 13 to 24 years old.

In National level, it is known United Methodist Youth Fellowship in the Philippines (UMYFP)

- United Methodist Young Adult Fellowship (UMYAF), for 25 to 40 years old.

In National level, United Methodist Young Adult Fellowship in the Philippines (UMYAFP)

- United Methodist Men (UMM), for men with ages 40 years old and above.
- United Methodist Women's Society of Christian Service (UMWSCS), for women with ages 40 years old and above.

Other special group fellowships

- United Methodist Elderly Fellowship
- United Methodist Church Workers’ Fellowship
- United Methodist Clergy Spouses’ Association
- United Methodist Preachers’ Kids Association

== See also ==
- Methodism
- Protestantism in the Philippines
- Conferences of the United Methodist Church
- Philippine Methodist Church
- Ang Iglesia Metodista sa Pilipinas
