= Peter D. Weaver =

United Methodist Church bishop

Peter D. Weaver (born 15 January 1945) is a retired bishop of The United Methodist Church.

== Education ==
Weaver was educated at West Virginia Wesleyan College where he earned a B.A. in 1966. He then earned a M.Div. at Drew University in 1969 and became a Doctor of Theology in 1975 after concluding studies at Boston University. Weaver also holds honorary doctorates from Lebanon Valley College (1999), Albright College (2000), West Virginia Wesleyan College (2007), and Boston University (2013).

== Ordained ministry ==
Before election to the episcopacy, Weaver served the Western Pennsylvania Conference as a pastor. He entered the ministry in 1967 as a deacon by Lloyd Christ Wicke and was ordained an elder by Roy Calvin Nichols in 1969. He held appointments as:

- Pastor, Whitaker United Methodist Church, 1971–77
- Senior Pastor, Smithfield United Church (UCC and UMC), Pittsburgh, PA, 1977–88
- Senior Pastor, First United Methodist Church, Pittsburgh, PA, 1988–96
- Adjunct Faculty, Drew Theological School, 1980-1992
- Faculty, Pittsburgh Theological Seminary, 1990-1996

== Episcopal ministry ==
He was elected a bishop of the United Methodist Church by the Northeastern Jurisdictional Conference in 1996. He was then appointed as the resident bishop to various Annual Conferences:

- Philadelphia Area (Eastern Pennsylvania and Peninsula Delaware Conferences) (1996-2004)
- Boston Episcopal Area (New England Annual Conference) (2004-12)

Weaver served his colleagues as President of the UMC Council of Bishops (2003–04). He was the first president bishop since the council increased the office's term to two years. He later served as Executive Secretary to the Council of Bishops (2012-16).

Weaver taught as the Bishop-in-Residence at Drew University Theological School(2016-20).

Weaver served as interim bishop of the Virginia Annual Conference in 2019.

== See also ==
- List of bishops of the United Methodist Church
