= Philip Cone Fletcher =

Episcopal Church elder (1870-1931)

Philip Cone Fletcher (1870 - 1931) was the presiding elder of the San Antonio district of the Methodist Episcopal Church, South.

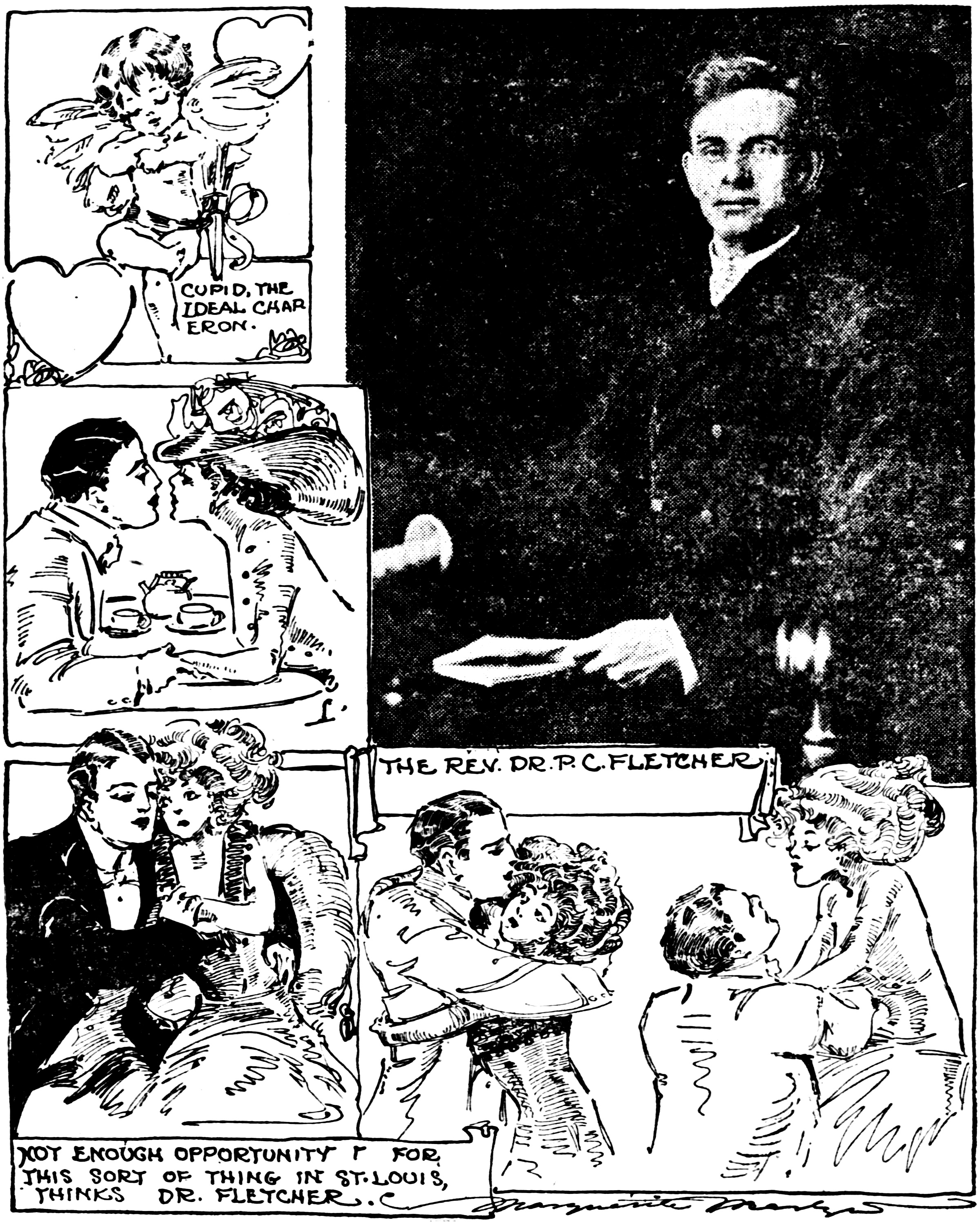
Photo of Fletcher and imaginative drawings by journalist Marguerite Martyn based on his ideas. Dan Cupid looks on from top left.

He received wide notice for advising girls and young women to use beauty aids if they wanted to. He also suggested that "courting places" be set aside for men and women to become acquainted with each other. In St. Louis, Missouri, these stances resulted in the revocation of an invitation to take over the pastorate of a church, so he went to Texas, where he remained.

== Positions ==
=== Love and marriage ===
Between 1902 and 1915, Fletcher gave sermons on "Love, Courtship and Marriage" and "Vital Lessons in Love." In his obituary, the St. Louis Post-Dispatch recalled that these sermons, as well as his advice about cosmetics for women, caused "much discussion."

==== Consequences ====
Fletcher, who was ministering to the First Methodist Church of St. Louis, in 1909 was nominated to take the pulpit at Scruggs Memorial Church. Parishioners of the latter church however, sent telegrams of objection to the appointment, and the appointment was not made. The St. Louis Post-Dispatch reported that the minister was deemed objectionable:

(1) because he used young women as ushers in his church; (2) because he encouraged courtship among young people in his church; (3) because he preached on "Love, Courtship and Marriage."

==== 'Cozy corners' and 'spooning' ====
He told a Chicago audience in 1926 that he had not changed his mind over the years.

Courtship is a very necessary thing. It can't be done in stuffy parlors in boarding houses. Automobiles with their freedom from restraint offers too much in the way of temptation. I approve of Chicago officials allowing spooning on park benches, because spooning is an old fashioned necessity, which leads to marriage.

=== 'Painting' controversy ===
In 1908, he preached in a St. Louis, Missouri, sermon that women had his "consent" to use "artificial beautifiers" such as "the powder puff, the paint brush and the brow pencil."

He said in a lecture:

If I were a young woman, I would try to be winsome. Beauty is a duty. Young women ought to strive to appear to the best advantage, mentally, physically and morally. It is all right to supplement the works of God. To be ugly is an age like this is but little short of a sin against God and self."

One California newspaper, though, reported that "This bouquet of advice, direct and implied, to young girls, which has emanated from various sources during the last twenty-four hours, is not all given the O.K. label by Mrs. P.J. O'Keeffe, member of the Chicago Board of Education."

Fletcher said later he meant that "a woman owed it to herself to make the most of her looks. According to some people, I advised every woman to lay on powder and paint with a towel. I would never think of giving such advice, of course."

=== The press ===
In a St. Louis lecture on the press, Fletcher decried "yellow journalism," but praised the "reputable press" as "one of the mightiest forces [for good] in our civilization."

=== Women's rights ===
In a public address in Little Rock, Fletcher said he was in favor of the General Conference of the Methodist Church extending to women all the rights of the laity on an equal footing with men.

He later urged that women be granted equal suffrage with men.

=== Evolution ===
Cone stated that he did not believe that humankind "descended from a monkey." He also declared that there is "no conflict between the Bible and true science."

== Biography ==
Fletcher was born on February 9, 1870, in Shenandoah, Virginia, the son of Lemuel and Lou Ellen (or Lucy Eleanor Smith) Fletcher.

He received a doctor of divinity degree from Hendrix College in 1915.

In 1900, Fletcher was pastor of the Methodist Episcopal Church, South, in Yellville, Arkansas. He also pastored in Fayetteville, Arkansas.

He had earlier been grand prelate of the Knights Templar of Texas and was pastor of the Laurel Heights Methodist Church in San Antonio, Texas, whence he came after an eight-year pastorate in Little Rock, Arkansas.

Fletcher, a prominent Mason, died of pneumonia in his San Antonio home on February 20 or 21, 1931. He was survived by his wife, the former Emmie A. Jackson, and a sister, Mrs. Robert E. Lee. A brother, William Smith Fletcher, predeceased him.

== Description ==
After an interview, reporter-artist Marguerite Martyn of the St. Louis Post-Dispatch said that Fletcher was

of the poetic type, with those romantic, prematurely gray flowing locks. He has the warm-hearted, spontaneous manner of the traditional Southerner[,] and it seemed the most natural thing in the world to be discussing with him for publication this subject [romance] usually too intimate to be of general concern.

== Legacy ==
Mrs. George L. Peyton bequeathed $10,000 to Southern Methodist University for a lectureship endowment on preaching as a memorial to Fletcher.

== Publications ==
- The Story of My Heart, The Alamo Press, 1929.
