= James Osgood Andrew =

American bishop (1794–1871)

- Bishop
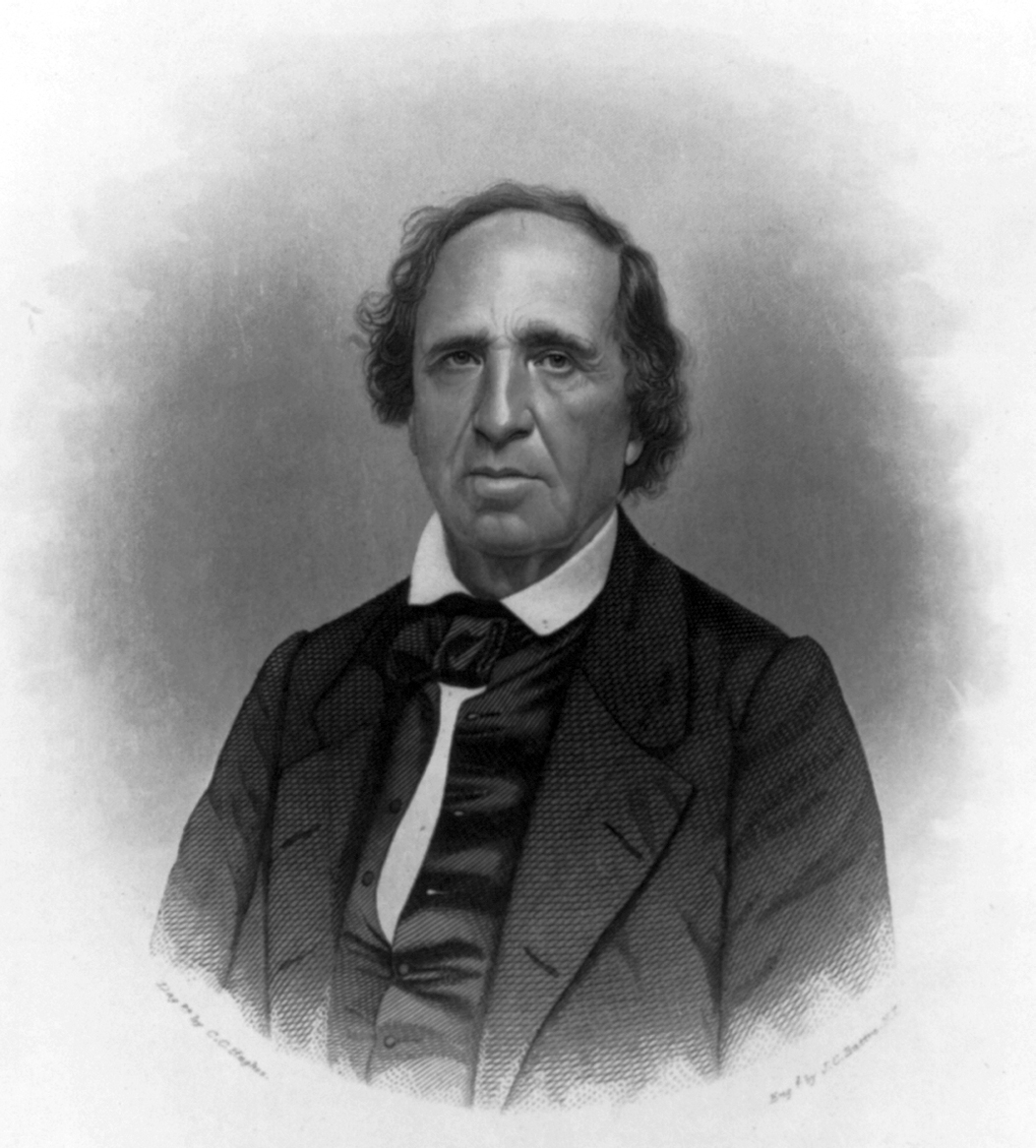
- Church: Methodist Episcopal Church; Methodist Episcopal Church, South
- Elected: 1832

Personal details
- Born: May 5, 1794 Wilkes County, Georgia, U.S.
- Died: May 1, 1871 (aged 76) Mobile, Alabama, U.S.

James Osgood Andrew (May 5, 1794 – May 1, 1871) was elected in 1832 an American bishop of the Methodist Episcopal Church. After the split within the church in 1844, he continued as a bishop in the Methodist Episcopal Church, South.

== Early life ==
Andrew was born on May 3, 1794, in the township of Washington in Wilkes County, Georgia, a son of the Rev. John and Mary Cosby Andrew. Rev. John Andrew was the first native Georgian to enter the Methodist ministry.

== Ordained ministry ==
James Andrew was licensed to preach in 1812 in Eliam Methodist Episcopal Church in the South Carolina Annual Conference of the M.E. Church. In 1814 was ordained a deacon and was admitted to the ministry in 1816. The first twenty years of his ministry included appointments to the Salt Ketcher Circuit in South Carolina, the Bladen Circuit in North Carolina, and the Augusta and Savannah circuits in Georgia.

In 1829 Andrew was appointed Presiding Elder of the Edisto District, which included Charleston, South Carolina. He was elected a Delegate to quadrennial M.E. General Conferences from 1820 through 1832.

== Episcopal ministry ==
Andrew was elected as a Bishop by the 1832 General Conference. He moved from Augusta to Newton County, Georgia, to be near the Methodist Manual Labor School, of which he was a Trustee. This institution later developed as Emory College at Oxford, Georgia. His Episcopal assignments also took him to Annual Conferences throughout the south and the west.

== Controversy over slave ownership ==
That Bishop James O. Andrew was owner of dozens of enslaved African-American people is well documented in U.S. Census records.

In the 1840s, the bishop's ownership of enslaved people generated controversy within the Methodist Episcopal Church, as the national organization had long opposed slavery. John Wesley, the founder of the Methodist movement, had been appalled by slavery. The church considered slavery to be "evil." Methodist preachers and church members were expected to take action to end the institution of slavery in America. Bishop Andrew was criticized by the 1844 General Convention and suspended from office until such time as he should end his "connection with slavery." Southern members disputed the convention's authority to discipline the bishop or to require slave-owning clergy to emancipate the people whom they considered as property. Andrew became the symbol of the slavery issue for the Methodist Episcopal Church. But the details surrounding his ownership of enslaved people, and how he acquired them, have been debated.

Andrew's defense at the 1844 General Convention appears to be the first assertion that he never bought or sold enslaved people. Rather, Andrew claimed that he became an enslaver through his wives. Andrew's supporters in the Methodist Episcopal Schism argued that he was only an enslaver through marriage and inheritance, thereby absolving him of blame. In 1816, Andrew married Ann Amelia MacFarlane, with whom he had six children. Upon her death in 1842, she allegedly bequeathed him an enslaved person. Andrew's second wife, Ann Leonora Mounger Greenwood Andrew, whom he married in 1844, was also an owner of enslaved people. When she died in 1854, he married Emily Sims Childers. The oft repeated assertion that Andrew only came into slave ownership by way of marriage or inheritance was reinforced by George G. Smith in his 1882 biography of Andrew.

Evidence exists to suggest Andrew may have first acquired enslaved people earlier than the death of his first wife in 1842. A James Osgood Andrew is listed as a resident of Athens, Georgia, in the 1830 U.S. Census. This Andrew is listed as the owner of two enslaved persons, although the New Georgia Encyclopedia sketch of Andrew concedes this man may not have been the man who was elected bishop. The 1840 Census lists Bishop Andrew as a resident of Newton County, Georgia, and the "Slave Owner" of 13 enslaved people. The Newton County, GA Property Tax Digests for 1848 show that James O. Andrew was assessed for 27 enslaved people, and for 21 people in 1849. The 1850 US Census Schedule of Slave Inhabitants in the State of Georgia and the 1851 tax records of Newton County document James O. Andrew as the "Slave Owner" of 24 enslaved men, women and children from age 2 to age 65. In 1855 he moved to Summerfield Alabama where he was enumerated in 1860 as the enslaver of 11 people. The fluctuations in enumeration of the people held in enslavement by Andrew could be explained by births and deaths among the enslaved, the exchange of enslaved people, or by the buying and selling of enslaved people. The accurate count of enslaved people was important for government purposes. The Census count of "Slave Inhabitants" under the Three-fifths Compromise was a factor in determining the number of seats states with enslaved populations had in the U.S. House of Representatives and in the Electoral College. The counting and valuation of enslaved people in tax digests was a factor in determining the amount of taxes to be paid by slave owners to local governments.

In 1924, John Donald Wade wrote that Bishop Andrew's case at the 1844 General Convention had concerned an enslaved boy named Jacob and an enslaved girl named Kitty. Since there is no written acknowledgment of her preferred name, her descendants and the members of the Black community of Oxford refer to her as either Catherine Boyd or Miss Kitty. This story was related in Wade's biography of Augustus Baldwin Longstreet, a prominent defender of the institution of slavery who had himself owned dozens of enslaved people. This tale claims that the enslaved Miss Kitty was so well treated that she declined Bishop Andrew's offer of freedom, a claim typical of the Confederate "Lost Cause" mythology. A memorial tablet for Miss Kitty by H.Y. McCord, which Andrew Shell placed in the Oxford City Cemetery in 1938, relates this tale. (Locals call it "Kitty's Stone.") The stone tablet states, "Kitty was a slave girl bequeathed to James O. Andrew by Mrs. Powers of Augusta, Georgia in her will when Kitty was 12 years of age with the stipulation that when she was 19 years of age, Kitty was to be given her freedom and sent to Liberia," which had been established by the American Colonization Society as a colony for free blacks. When Miss Kitty was 19, Bishop Andrew had Dr. A. B. Longstreet, who was then President of Emory College, and Professor George W. Lane interview her about her wishes. Miss Kitty declined to go to Liberia, saying, "I don't want to go to that country. I know nobody there. It is a long ways, and I might die before I get there." While Miss Kitty was allowed many personal freedoms, she remained enslaved by Bishop Andrew until her death at the age of perhaps twenty-nine, in 1851. Although under the laws of Georgia at that time, Bishop Andrew could have freed Miss Kitty and sent her to a free state, he chose not to do so. Instead, he "gifted" her a cottage in his backyard smaller than a modern trailer where she lived and worked for his family. As no legal marriage could be contracted by enslaved peoples under civil law, Miss Kitty was allowed to live in a "marriage arrangement" with her enslaved husband Nathan Boyd, and the couple had three children.

On February 6, 2011, Emory University hosted a conference in Oxford, Georgia to celebrate the legacy of Catherine Boyd. This was part of an emerging recognition of the role of enslaved labor in the history of Emory University and Oxford College. Today, the cottage where Catherine Boyd lived stands where it was originally built, in the shadow of the large Old Church before it. Before the cottage stands a plaque, which reads "Kitty preferred to remain with the Andrew family rather than be sent to Africa." While the circumstances behind the construction of Miss Kitty's cottage and said plaque are not yet common knowledge on Oxford campus, steps are being taken to bring James Andrew's involvement into the light. Mark Auslander, a former professor at Oxford college and renowned anthropologist, spent many years researching Catherine Boyd and ultimately wrote a book titled "The Accidental Slaveowner: Revisiting a Myth of Race & Finding An American Family". He explains that "White members of the community [are] invested in the story that Miss Kitty was a loyal happy mammy and servant. [For them] she summed up the whole story of race relations in the state of Georgia. For African-Americans in town, the story was so different." While some may see Miss Kitty's compliance as a symbol of the grace of the Old South and a sign of a "mutual understanding" between slavers and the enslaved, many scholars believe that her portrayal as a loyal servant that chose to stay with her enslaver is a distorted narrative of the non-choice that Miss Kitty was presented with. Bishop Andrew and his supporters claimed that Miss Kitty chose to stay with him. However, in the 1840s, long-distance sea travel to Liberia would have been a highly dangerous journey. In addition, Miss Kitty had no family or friends in Liberia, as opposed to her husband and children in Oxford. Therefore, while Miss Kitty may have "chosen" to stay in service to Bishop Andrew in Georgia, she ultimately did not have much of a real choice.

Another version of Miss Kitty's story sees her as possibly the daughter of James O. Andrew by another enslaved woman, or perhaps even his coerced mistress.

The view of the U.M.E. church legislation was that clergy should not enslave people, no matter how acquired. The abolitionist movement was evident within Methodism from its very foundation. Missionaries in the South had at first encouraged slaveholders to free any people they enslaved. But as the economic viability of slavery expanded in the South, adherence to those foundational tenets waned. In 1808, the General Conference granted that the regional conferences could craft their own guidelines on slavery. Allowing the conferences to make accommodations for slavery essentially reversed the anti-slavery heritage of the church, at least in the South. During the 1844 General Conference, northern delegates challenged Andrew's role as an enslaver. They argued that holding enslaved persons went against U.M.E. values and that he should emancipate the enslaved persons in his household. Delegates from Georgia, including then Emory president Augustus Baldwin Longstreet, argued that the Methodist Church should support enslavement because it was in effort to perform a "mission to the slaves" by converting enslaved people to Christianity, which was a reflection of God's will. Andrew, Longstreet and other southern Methodist leaders argued that accommodations for slavery fit within the Christian tradition, and positioned the church to influence southern planters for paternal protection and improved treatment of enslaved people. But strongly abolitionist Northern delegates sponsored a resolution asking Bishop Andrew to "desist" from exercising the Episcopal office so long as he continued to enslave people. Although Southern delegates countered that the Church would be destroyed in the many southern states that prohibited emancipation, the resolution passed by a vote of 110 to 69.

This censure of Bishop Andrew was intolerable to the southern dissidents who within days proposed a Plan of Separation between northern and southern Methodists. The next year representatives of the Southern Annual Conferences met in Louisville, Kentucky, to organize their own denomination. The first General Conference of the Methodist Episcopal Church, South met in Petersburg, Virginia, in 1846, and Andrew was invited to preside.

== Later years ==
Bishop Andrew presided as the Senior Bishop of his denomination from 1846 until his death. He led the Southern ministers of the church in dividing from the main church over the issue of slavery in 1846, and became the first bishop of the Methodist Episcopal Church, South. During the American Civil War (1861–65), he resided in Summerfield, Alabama.

Andrew was a founding trustee of Central University, a Methodist university, in 1858. It was renamed Vanderbilt University in 1872.

After his retirement in 1866, he continued to conduct church conferences as his health permitted. He died on March 2, 1871, at the home of a daughter and son-in-law, the Rev. and Mrs. J.W. Rush, in Mobile, Alabama. He was buried in Oxford. Andrew College in Cuthbert, Georgia, is named for him.

== Selected writings ==
- Family Government, 1846.
- Miscellanies, 1854.
- He also contributed to religious periodicals.

== Biographies ==
- Smith, George G., The Life and Letters of James Osgood Andrew, Bishop of the Methodist Episcopal Church, South, Nashville, Southern Methodist Publishing House, 1882.

== See also ==
- List of bishops of the United Methodist Church
