= Alfred Lloyd Norris =

American bishop

Alfred Lloyd Norris (born 6 February 1938) is a retired American Bishop of the United Methodist Church, elected in 1992. He also distinguished himself as a Methodist/United Methodist Pastor, as a District Superintendent, as the President of a U.M. Seminary, and as a Mason.

== Birth and family ==
Norris was born in Bogalusa, Louisiana. He is a child of the church, the first son of the Rev. L.H.P. and Adele (Washington) Norris. Alfred married Mackie Lyvonne Harper in September 1961. Mackie earned a Bachelor of Science degree in Nursing from Dillard University and a Master of nursing degree from Emory University and taught Community Health Nursing on the faculties of Emory, Dillard, Louisiana State University, and Loyola University in New Orleans. She earned the Ph.D. degree from Emory in May 1996.

Alfred and Mackie have one son, Alfred II and daughter-in-law Lisa; and one daughter, Angela Renee and son-in-law Tyrone; and four grandchildren; Alfred III (Trey), Justin Douglass Norris, Mark David Johnson and Faith Rachelle Johnson.

== Education ==
Alfred received his high school diploma from the Southern University Laboratory School, Baton Rouge, Louisiana. He earned a B.A. degree from Dillard University in New Orleans, Louisiana in 1960. He earned an M.Div. degree from Gammon Theological Seminary, Atlanta, Georgia.

== Ordained ministry ==
Rev. Norris was ordained a Deacon in the Louisiana Annual Conference of The Methodist Church in 1961. He was ordained an Elder in the same in 1963. He served as Pastor of the following churches in Louisiana: Haven (1963–66), Peck (1966–68), First Street (1972–74) and Mount Zion (1980-85).

Rev. Norris was the director of recruitment for Gammon Theological Seminary from 1968 until 1972. He was the superintendent of the New Orleans/Houma District of the Louisiana Conference from 1974 until 1980. He served as president of Gammon Seminary of the Interdenominational Theological Center in Atlanta from 1985 until his election to the episcopacy.

== Service to the Greater Church ==
Rev. Norris was elected a delegate from Louisiana to the quadrennial General Conference of the U.M.Church in 1976 and 1984–92, elected to lead the delegation in 1992. He was a Jurisdictional Conference delegate, 1976-92. He was a delegate to the World Methodist Conference each quinquennium, 1976-92.

Rev. Norris served as chairperson of the Louisiana Conference Board of Ordained Ministry (1980–88), as a member of the General Board of Publication of the U.M. Church (1980–92), and as a member of the Association of U.M. Theological Schools (1985–92). In 1985 Alfred served as the first president of the Louisiana Council for the Adoption of Minority Youth.

== Episcopal ministry ==
The Rev. Alfred Lloyd Norris was elected a bishop by the 1992 South Central Jurisdictional Conference of the U.M. Church. He was assigned to the Northwest Texas-New Mexico Episcopal Area, with headquarters in Albuquerque, New Mexico.

== Honors ==
Bishop Norris' biography appears in the 1991-92 Marquis Edition of Who's Who in the South and Southwest. He is also a 33rd degree Prince Hall Mason. Moreover, he holds honorary doctorates from several institutions of higher education, including the D.D. degree from Gammon Theological Seminary.

== See also ==
- List of bishops of the United Methodist Church
