= Goodpaster =

Goodpaster is a surname. Notable people with the surname include:

- Andrew Goodpaster (1915–2005), United States Army general
- Larry M. Goodpaster (born 1948), American United Methodist bishop
