= Tennessee Conference =

The Tennessee-Western Kentucky Conference is an Annual Conference (a regional episcopal area, similar to a diocese) of the United Methodist Church. This conference serves the congregations in Middle Tennessee and West Tennessee and is part of the Southeastern Jurisdictional Conference, and is over seen by resident Bishop Reverend David Graves. Bishop Graves was elected to the episcopacy in 2024. The episcopal office is located in downtown Nashville at 1908 Grand Avenue, Nashville, TN 37212.

The mission of the Tennessee-Western Kentucky Conference is to discover, equip, connect, and send lay and clergy leaders who shape congregations that offer Jesus Christ to a hurting world one neighborhood at a time.

The Tennessee-Western Kentucky Conference maintains two campground/retreat centers:

- Beersheba Springs Assembly, Beersheba Springs, Tennessee
- Cedar Crest Camp, Lyles, TN

== Districts ==
The Tennessee-Western Kentucky Conference is further subdivided into 3 smaller regions, called "districts," which provide further administrative functions for the operation of local churches in cooperation with each other. This structure is vital to Methodism, and is referred to as connectionalism. The districts that comprise the Tennessee-Western Kentucky Conference are: the Eastern District, the Northwestern District, and the Southwestern District.

== See also ==
- Annual Conferences of the United Methodist Church
- Tennessee-Western Kentucky Conference Staff
- Camp & Retreat Ministries
- Disaster Response for the Tennessee-Western Kentucky Conference
