= North Texas Conference =

The North Texas Conference is an Annual Conference (a regional episcopal area of the United Methodist Church). This conference encompasses a triangle-shaped northern portion of the state of Texas that spans from Dallas to Wichita Falls to Paris. The conference includes a small geographic area relative to most annual conferences. The North Texas Conference comprises 301 churches, 141,827 members, 4 districts and 20 counties.

Administrative offices are located in Plano, Texas. It is part of the South Central Jurisdictional Conference. On September 1, 2012, Bishop Michael McKee began leading the conference.

== Districts ==
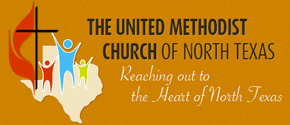
NTC UMC logo

The North Texas Annual Conference is subdivided into four smaller regions, called "districts", which provide further administrative functions for the operation of local churches in cooperation with each other. Each district has a District Superintendent who has a vital role in determining the appointments of clergy to local churches. The districts that are comprised by the North Texas Conference are:

- Metro District. The Metro District comprises most of Dallas County. The 79 churches and fellowships in the Metro District share a mission field that is the most economically, ethnically, and culturally diverse part of the North Texas Conference. Persons living in the Metro District face unique struggles and challenges. Likewise, the churches that comprise the Metro District have unique ways of assessing their needs, reaching new persons, and responding to their neighbors. The Metro District allows the District Superintendent to oversee the pastors and laity of these 79 congregations to dream dreams and implement measurable and creative ways of reaching the neighbors and neighborhoods in the Metro area. Over the next 10 years it is expected that the Metro District will increase in population by 9%. District Superintendent is Reverend Camille Gaston.
- North Central District. The North Central District mission field is one of continued growth. Projected growth in parts of Dallas, Wise, and Kaufman counties is considerable. Expansive growth is expected in Denton, Collin, and Rockwall counties. Overall the North Central District can anticipate 39% population growth by 2019. By 2019 the population of the North Central District will almost equal the Metro District's population. The 66 churches and fellowships in the North Central District share a mission field that is developing, accelerating, and expanding. The District Superintendent, pastors, and churches of the North Central District have a unique and evolving mission field and need to strategize, implement, and reach the largest influx of persons moving into North Texas in the next 10 years. District Superintendent is Reverend Dr. Ronald Henderson.
- East District. The East District is made up of 88 churches on the eastern side of the North Texas Conference. It stretches from Greenville on the West to Mt. Vernon on the East, Bonham to Avery on the north and Aley to Winnsboro on the South. Sixty two pastors serve with over 12,000 professing members to minister the grace of Christ to more than 116,000 households in this broad mission field. Through congregations that are county seat, town and country, family chapels, college campuses, and even a 'cowboy' church, the East District is alive and active, making disciples of Jesus Christ for the transformation of the world. The District Superintendent is Reverend Victor Casad.
- Northwest District. The Northwest District comprises rural, town and country, and county seat congregations in the North Texas Conference. The 68 churches and fellowships in the Northwest District can anticipate 6% population growth over the next decade. Relating, reaching and responding to the lifestyles and mindset of those who live in our rural town and country settings take a different set of skills for the District Superintendent, pastors and churches to connect, grow and send forth disciples who will transform the world for Christ.The District Superintendent is Reverend L. Marvin Guier, III.

== Centers ==
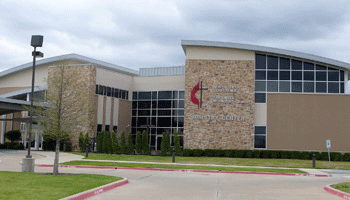
North Texas Conference UMC Ministry Center

- Center for Leadership Development. The Center for Leadership Development (CLD) exists to help clergy and laity recognize God’s call of Living Discipleship Fruitfulness, Leading Congregational Fruitfulness and Developing Missional Fruitfulness to live out our mission “to make disciples of Jesus Christ for the transformation of the world.” The Center Director is Reverend Marti Soper.
- Center for Missional Outreach. The Center for Missional Outreach works to understand and combat the causes of poverty through connectionalism. The Center’s goal is to facilitate this process by promoting best practices and helping churches that need a little extra assistance and mentoring. The Center’s belief is that ministry with the poor begins by listening to and learning from those affected by poverty, those with firsthand knowledge of circumstances and potential solutions. The Center Director is Reverend Dr. Larry George.
- Center for New Church Development and Congregational Transformation. The Center for New Church Development and Congregational Transformation exists to create a culture of “churches planting churches” as we plant new communities of faith, and to facilitate congregational transformation in existing churches. The Center Director is Reverend Jim Ozier.
- Center for Connectional Resources. The Center for Connectional Resources provides administrative services for the churches of The North Texas Conference. These services include the central treasury, pensions, health insurance, property and liability insurance, and others. The Center Director is Reverend Jodi Smith.

== Institutions (owned by or with a strong relationship with the North Texas Conference) ==
- Dallas Bethlehem Center
- Bridgeport Camp & Conference Center
- C.C. Young Home
- Methodism's Breadbasket
- Methodist Medical Center of Dallas
- Project Transformation
- Prothro Center at Lake Texoma
- Southern Methodist University (including Perkins School of Theology)
- Texas Methodist Foundation
- Wesley-Rankin Community Center
- Wesley Village
- ZIP Code Connection

== Statistics ==
- 2014 Membership: 141,827
- 2014 Number of Churches in Conference: 301
- 2014 Number of Counties: 20

== 2016 General Conference and Jurisdictional Conference Delegates ==
The following delegates were elected at the 2014 North Texas Annual Conference held in June 2014 for the 2016 General Conference on May 10–20, 2016, in Portland, Oregon, and the 2016 South Central Jurisdictional Conference on July 13–16, 2016, in Wichita, Kansas.

Clergy Delegates to General Conference

- Jan Davis, First UMC Rowlett
- Clayton Oliphint, First UMC Richardson
- Jill-Jackson Sears, Lake Highlands UMC, Dallas
- Dr. Ronald Henderson, North Central District Superintendent
- Don Underwood, Christ UMC, Plano

Lay Delegates to General Conference

- Tim Crouch, First UMC Denton
- Linda Parks, Conference Lay Leader, Northwest District
- Kelly Carpenter, Lovers Lane UMC, Dallas
- Ricky Harrison, First UMC Richardson
- Richard Hearne, University Park UMC, Dallas

Clergy Delegates to Jurisdictional Conference

- Owen Ross, Christ’s Foundry, Dallas
- Joe Stobaugh, Grace Avenue UMC, Frisco
- Lisa Greenwood, Texas Methodist Foundation
- Ouida Lee, Church of the Disciple, DeSoto
- Tim Morrison, Custer Road UMC, Plano

Lay Delegates to Jurisdictional Conference

- Gretchen Toler-Debus, Oak Lawn UMC, Dallas
- Daniel Soliz, Elmwood UMC, Dallas
- Sally Vonner, First UMC Grand Prairie
- Henry Lessner, Assoc. Conference Lay Leader, North Central District
- Timmy Clark, First UMC Rockwall

Alternates

Clergy:

- Andy Stoker, First UMC Dallas
- Derek Jacobs, The Village, DeSoto
- Holly Bandel, Stonebridge UMC, McKinney

Lay:

- Herman Totten, Trinity UMC, Denton
- Serena Echert, Conference Secretary of Global Ministries
- Don Wiley, Lovers Lane UMC, Dallas

== Key Conference Leaders ==
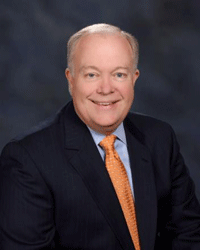
Bishop Michael McKee

Bishop Michael McKee

- Bishop Michael McKee, Bishop effective September 2012
- Extended Cabinet of North Texas Conference
- Center Directors (see listed above in Centers section)
- District Superintendents (see listed above in Districts section)
- Delegates to 2016 General Conference / Jurisdictional Conference (see listed above in Delegates section)
- Linda Parks, Conference Lay Leader effective July 2012

== See also ==
- Annual Conferences of the United Methodist Church
