= District superintendent =

District superintendent may refer to:

- District superintendent (Methodism), a cleric who serves in a supervisory position over a geographic district of churches
- District superintendent, a senior rank in the Metropolitan Police from 1869 to 1886, when it was renamed chief constable
- District superintendent of police, a variant of the rank of superintendent of police in some Commonwealth countries
