= Sharma Lewis =

Bishop in the United Methodist Church

The Reverend Sharma Lewis
- Bishop
- Diocese: Mississippi Conference, United Methodist Church
- Elected: 2016
- Installed: 2016
- Predecessor: James Swanson

Personal details
- Born: 1963 (age 62–63) Statesboro Georgia
- Denomination: United Methodist
- Residence: Mississippi
- Occupation: Bishop
- Education: Master of Science, Master of Divinity
- Alma mater: Gammon Theological Seminary

Sharma D. Lewis (born 1963) is an American bishop in the United Methodist Church. She was consecrated in 2016 and is the resident bishop of the Mississippi episcopal area. She is the first African American woman to be elected as bishop in the UMC's Southeastern Jurisdictional Conference.

== Early life ==
Sharma D. Lewis was born in 1963 in Statesboro, Georgia. Her parents, Charlie Lewis and Alethia Lewis, were owners of several small businesses in the community, including Lewis Van Lines, the first African-American moving company in the county. Together, they raised five children - four girls and one boy; Sharma was the fourth child. They were religiously observant Methodists, and the family attended services at Brannen Chapel United Methodist Church in Statesboro. Lewis' parents were also very community focused. Charlie Lewis was actively involved in many church roles and community organizations. Alethia Lewis served as president and state treasurer for the NAACP.

As a young woman, Lewis was passionate about science, and her first career was as a biologist and chemist. She graduated from Mercer University with a Bachelor of Science degree in biology in 1985. She went on to graduate school, completing a Master of Science degree in biology at the University of West Georgia in 1988. After graduation, she began working as a scientist in corporate settings and academia for a few years. She had applied to medical school twice and been denied. She applied a third time, but while she was waiting to hear if she had been accepted, her Aunt Essie, a Methodist minister, encouraged her to pursue ministry instead.

== Ordained ministry ==
Lewis decided to enter seminary, and earned a Master of Divinity degree with honors from Gammon Theological Seminary in Atlanta, Georgia. The seminary is affiliated with the UMC and is one of six historically African American theological schools which combine to make up the Interdenominational Theological Center.

After earning her degree in 1999, Lewis was ordained. She was appointed by her bishop to serve as the associate pastor at Ben Hill UMC in Atlanta. She was later promoted to senior associate pastor at Ben Hill.

Lewis offered to serve a cross-racial posting and was next assigned to be the senior pastor for a predominately white congregation, Powers Ferry UMC in East Cobb,\ on the outskirts of Marietta, Georgia. She was the first woman to pastor the church, and also the first African American. Her next assignment was as senior minister of the Wesley Chapel United Methodist Church in McDonough, Georgia. As with Powers Ferry, she was the first woman to be the lead pastor of Wesley Chapel UMC. In recognition of her leadership, and the ways in which her ministry enlivened her congregation and helped grow the membership, she was honored with two awards, including the G. Ross Freeman Leadership Award, which had never before been given to a woman.

Lewis became the district superintendent for the Atlanta-Decatur-Oxford District in the UMC's North Georgia Conference in 2010.

=== Election as bishop ===
In 2016, Lewis was one of five new bishops elected at the quadrennial gathering of the Southeastern Jurisdictional Conference held at Lake Junaluska, North Carolina. The Southeastern Jurisdictional Conference is the regional authority overseeing twelve UMC conferences in the states of Georgia, Virginia, North Carolina, South Carolina, Kentucky, Tennessee, Alabama, Mississippi, and Florida. Lewis was elected on the first ballot and, according to news reports, there was cheering and applause when her election was announced. It was a historic moment, as she was the first African American woman ever to be elected to the position of bishop in the Southeastern Jurisdictional Conference. She was also the first African American woman bishop to be elected within the UMC since 2000.

Lewis' election occurred 60 years after women were granted "full clergy rights" in the United Methodist Church, allowing them to serve as fully-ordained ministers. The UMC elected its first woman bishop, Marjorie Matthews, in 1980. The first African American woman bishop, Leontine T. C. Kelly, was elected in the UMC in 1984. Between 2012 and 2016, the UMC had no active African American women bishops. In 2016, seven women were elected as bishops across the UMC denomination, of which four were African American. In addition to Lewis, the active African American women bishops in the UMC are Tracy Smith Malone, Cynthia Moore-Koikoi, and LaTrelle Miller Easterling.

In the United Methodist Church, bishops are elected for life. They serve an episcopal district for a four-year term, and generally stay for two terms in a region. Lewis was assigned as the bishop for the Virginia Conference in 2016. Her predecessor was Bishop Young Jin Cho.

Lewis began her tenure as bishop of the Mississippi conference on January 1, 2023.

=== Controversy ===
In June 2022, Bishop Sharma Lewis was accused of evading the duties prescribed for bishops in the United Methodist Church's Book of Discipline. Accordingly, Lewis had left a complaint against the Reverend Drew Ensz go unresolved for more than 1,000 days, prolonging Ensz's case beyond what is permissible by the Book of Discipline. In 2019, Ensz was accused of performing a same-sex wedding for one of his former students, and the case was put in the authority of Lewis. A Just Resolution was reached in the complaint pending against Rev. Ensz after the departure of Bishop Lewis and the installation of Bishop Sue Haupert-Johnson on June 5, 2023."Joint Statement on Just Resolution". www.vaumc.org.

In April 2023, Lewis denied the request of two female Mississippi ministers for further talks to reach a resolution to a complaint Lewis has overseen regarding the ministers officiating of a wedding ceremony for two non-binary people. Despite the UMC's traditional practice of attempting to reach a resolution before moving a complaint to public trial, Lewis refused a mediator requested by the ministers and moved to put them on trial within the church. Ultimately, both clergy were put on an unprecedented year-long, unpaid suspension, ending July 1, 2024. People from around the country raised money to financially support the clergy.

On June 3, 2025, the Judicial Council of the United Methodist Church ruled that the Board of Trustees of the Mississippi Annual Conference violated church law by creating an extended means to disaffiliate from the UMC past the UMC Book of Discipline's deadline and that the conference's decision was "null and void and has no force or effect." These actions had been referred to the Judicial Council by majority vote of the bishops of the Southeastern Jurisdiction of the UMC. In a video released by the Mississippi Annual Conference on January 31, 2025, Lewis explained that they did indeed intend to extend the ability for churches to disaffiliate past the deadline of Paragraph 2553 of the Book of Discipline and that, due to the impending decision, a planned panel discussion to answer disaffiliation questions had been cancelled.

== Awards ==
- Harry Denham Award for Evangelism, North Georgia Conference, The United Methodist Church (2010)
- G. Ross Freeman Leadership Award, Southeastern Jurisdictional Conference (2010)
- Trailblazer Award, Metropolitan Atlanta Chapter, the National Coalition of 100 Black Women

== See also ==
- List of bishops of the United Methodist Church
- Ordination of women in Methodism
