= Episcopal area =

Episcopal area may refer to:

- Episcopal area (Anglicanism)
- Episcopal area (United Methodist Church)

== See also ==
- Episcopal conference, Catholic conference of bishops
