= District Superintendent =

District Superintendent may be:

- District Superintendent (United Methodist Church)
- A rank in the London Metropolitan Police in use from 1869 to 1886, when it was renamed Chief Constable
- The full title of the rank of Superintendent (police) in many former British territories
