= Interdenominational Theological Center =

Theological school in Atlanta, Georgia, US

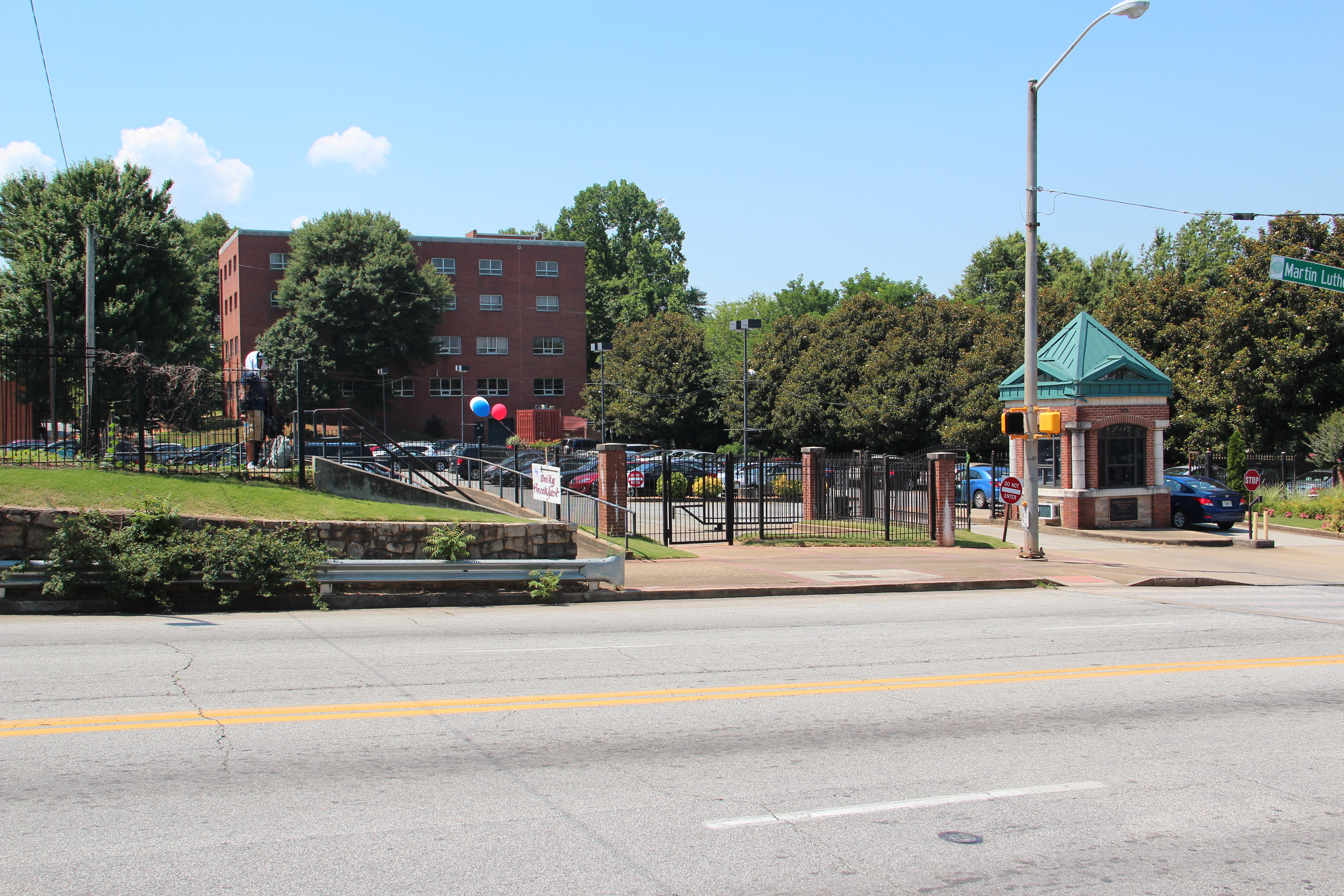
- Type: Private, historically black, theological
- Established: 1958
- Affiliations: multiple
- President: Maisha Handy (interim)
- Academic staff: 16
- Students: 55
- Location: Atlanta, Georgia, United States
- Website: www.itc.edu

The Interdenominational Theological Center (ITC) is a consortium of five predominantly African-American denominational Christian seminaries in Atlanta, Georgia, operating together as a professional graduate school of theology. It is the largest free-standing African-American theological school in the United States.

Its constituent seminaries are the Morehouse School of Religion (associated with a number of Baptist groups, including American Baptist Churches USA, National Baptist Convention, USA, and Progressive National Baptist Convention); Gammon Theological Seminary (United Methodist Church); Turner Theological Seminary (African Methodist Episcopal Church); Phillips School of Theology (Christian Methodist Episcopal Church); and Charles H. Mason Theological Seminary (Church of God in Christ). All have the mission to educate Christian leaders for ministry and service. Students who are not affiliated with one of the five denominations represented by these seminaries are enrolled in the ITC's Harry V. and Selma T. Richardson Ecumenical Fellowship program.

== History ==
The idea of a single collaborative institution for the training and development of African-American Christian ministers began to form in the early 1940s. After Benjamin Mays became president of Morehouse College, Gammon Theological Seminary and Morehouse began a cooperative exchange program. Morehouse College was interested in phasing out its Bachelor of Divinity (B.D.) degree program, while increasing its liberal arts focus.

Mays thought that individually, the several theological schools for African Americans would be unable to obtain the resources to develop and maintain first-rate facilities and programs, but could be successful by working together. Discussions about cooperation among Gammon, Morehouse, and Morris Brown College (representing Turner Theological Seminary) began in the early 1940s.

In the 1950s, the concept of a new collaborative seminary in Atlanta gained support from foundations and the American Association of Theological Schools (AATS). The Phillips School of Theology, then located at Lane College in Jackson, Tennessee, later joined the discussions.

In 1958, the ITC was founded as a joint initiative of four seminaries: the Baptist-affiliated Morehouse School of Religion, the United Methodist-affiliated Gammon Theological Seminary, Turner Theological Seminary (African Methodist Episcopal), and Phillips School of Theology (Christian Methodist Episcopal). The Sealantic Fund, which had been established by John D. Rockefeller Jr. to support theological education, was a major source of financial support. In September 1959, when instruction began, the ITC had 21 faculty members and 97 students.

The new institution occupied the Gammon campus until its own facilities were completed in 1961. The combined institution quickly won accreditation from the AATS, which had previously accredited Gammon. Dr. Harry Van Buren Richardson, the president of Gammon Theological Seminary, became the first president of ITC, serving in that position from 1959 to 1968.

In 1970, the Charles H. Mason Theological Seminary was established as a new seminary within ITC, named for Charles Harrison Mason, founder of the Church of God in Christ.

The Lutheran Theological Center in Atlanta was established on the ITC campus in 1997. Its establishment was an outgrowth of an enrichment program, started in 1988, through which students from two Evangelical Lutheran Church in America (ELCA) seminaries took courses at the ITC. The Lutheran Center now provides opportunities for students at any of ELCA's eight seminaries to take courses in Atlanta at the ITC, Candler School of Theology, or Columbia Theological Seminary for academic credit at their home seminaries.

In April 2023, ITC declared "financial exigency," initiating a period of review to ensure the Center's long-term viability.

=== Former members ===
The Presbyterian-affiliated Johnson C. Smith Theological Seminary joined ITC in 1969 relocating to Atlanta from Charlotte, North Carolina. The Johnson C. Smith Theological Seminary withdrew from the ITC in June 2014.

From 1971 through 1979, the ITC also operated the Absalom Jones Theological Institute in cooperation with the Episcopal Church. This institute was named for Absalom Jones of Philadelphia, Pennsylvania, the first African American to be ordained as an Episcopal priest. Enrollment was insufficient to support the seminary's continued operation and it closed in 1979.

== Academics ==
ITC awards two master's degrees: Master of Divinity (M.Div.), and Master of Arts in Religion and Education (M.A.R.E.). ITC also offers one Doctor of Ministry (D. Min.). The Master of Divinity program is available online, as well as on the ITC campus. The D.Min. degree program is intended for persons who are currently engaged in Christian ministry and have at least three years of experience in ministerial leadership. In addition to the degree programs, a Certificate in Theology program has been conducted at a number of off-campus locations in the U.S. and worldwide. This is a community outreach program that provides no academic credit.

=== Accreditation and affiliations ===
ITC is accredited to award masters and doctoral degrees by both the Southern Association of Colleges and Schools Commission on Colleges and the Association of Theological Schools in the United States and Canada. In December 2015, the Southern Association's Commission on Colleges reaffirmed ITC's accreditation. On June 7, 2016, the Association of Theological Schools’ (ATS) Commission on Accrediting confirmed that ITC has demonstrated its financial viability.

ITC is the only graduate institution of theological education that is a member of the United Negro College Fund. ITC is one of the five organizations that form the Atlanta Theological Association, which also includes the Candler School of Theology, Columbia Theological Seminary, Erskine Theological Seminary, and the Georgia Association for Pastoral Care. Other ITC affiliations includes the Robert W. Woodruff Library and the Atlanta Regional Council for Higher Education.

== Campus ==
ITC occupies a 10-acre (4.0 ha) campus, between Beckwith Street and Martin Luther King Jr. Dr., in the Atlanta University Center, near Morehouse College, Spelman College, Morris Brown College, Clark Atlanta University, and the Morehouse School of Medicine.

== Faculty and students ==
ITC is the largest free-standing African American theological school in the United States. As of 2017, the institution has about 25 full- and part-time faculty and enrolls about 300 students. More than 15 denominations are represented in the student body.

=== Notable alumni ===
- Charles Edward Blake Sr., American minister and Presiding Bishop of the Church of God in Christ
- Joseph E. Boone, American civil rights activist
- L. Venchael Booth, American Baptist pastor and President of the Progressive National Baptist Convention
- Alexander Priestly Camphor (1865–1919), American minister, academic administrator, and Missionary Bishop of the Methodist Episcopal Church
- Katie Cannon, American minister and the first woman to be ordained in the United Presbyterian Church in the United States of America
- Dee Dawkins-Haigler, American politician
- DeWitt Sanford Dykes Sr. (1903–1991) American architect of churches, Methodist minister
- Marshall Gilmore, American minister and Bishop of the Christian Methodist Episcopal Church
- Jacquelyn Grant, American theologian
- William Talbot Handy (1894–1983), American Methodist minister
- W. T. Handy, Jr., American civil rights activist and United Methodist bishop
- Alann Johnson, American politician
- Mordecai Wyatt Johnson, American educator and first African-American president of Howard University
- Sharma Lewis, American minister and United Methodist bishop
- Sidney Locks, American politician and Baptist minister
- Eddie Long, American pastor
- Mary Madison, American minister and politician
- Lydia Meredith, American author and business executive
- Alfred Lloyd Norris, American minister and United Methodist bishop
- John Jarvis Seabrook (1899–1975), American pastor, academic administrator, theologian
- Alexander Preston Shaw, American minister and Bishop of the Methodist Episcopal Church
- Prince Albert Taylor Jr., American minister and Bishop of the Methodist Church and, later, the United Methodist Church
- McKinley Washington Jr., American politician and pastor
- Gayraud Wilmore, American historian and theologian

== Publications ==
Since 1973, ITC has published an annual academic journal, The Journal of the Interdenominational Theological Center. ITC describes the journal as "dedicated to the advancement of theological education with a special emphasis on the African-American perspective." The ITC Press also has published books, including seven volumes in the Black Church Scholars Series.

== External perspectives ==
In their 1990 book The Black Church in the African American Experience, C. Eric Lincoln and Lawrence H. Mamiya identified the ITC as one of several black ecumenical initiatives that arose in the United States in connection with the civil rights and black consciousness movements. They called the ITC "one of the more successful ventures in black ecumenism". In their 2007 book The Future of Pentecostalism in the United States, Eric Patterson and Edmund John Rybarczyk described the ITC as "a major center of progressive, African American theological thought".

== See also ==
- Black church
- List of colleges and universities in metropolitan Atlanta
