= Harry Van Buren Richardson =

American theologian (1901–1990)

- Born: June 27, 1901; Jacksonville, Florida, US
- Died: December 13, 1990 (aged 89); Atlanta, Georgia, US
- Occupations: Theologian, author, educator

Harry Van Buren Richardson (June 27, 1901 – December 13, 1990) was a theologian, writer, and the first president of the Interdenominational Theological Center.

== Education ==
Richardson began his college training from Western Reserve University where he received an A.B., and later matriculated to Harvard University where he received a S.T.B. from the Divinity School. While at Harvard, he was awarded the university's two highest honors. In 1945, Richardson received his PhD from Drew University in rural sociology and religion.

== Published works ==
- 1947: Dark Glory: A Picture of the Church among Negroes in the Rural South
- 1976: Dark Salvation: The Story of Methodism as It Developed among Blacks in America
- 1981: Walk Together, Children: The Story of the Birth and Growth of the Interdenominational Theological Center
