= South Carolina Annual Conference =

The South Carolina Conference is an annual conference (regional episcopal area, similar to a diocese) of the United Methodist Church. This conference serves the state of South Carolina with its administrative offices and the office of the bishop (currently L. Jonathan Holston) being in Columbia, South Carolina. It is part of the Southeastern Jurisdictional Conference.

The South Carolina Conference provides funding to four institutions of higher learning:

- Spartanburg Methodist College -- Spartanburg, South Carolina
- Claflin University -- Orangeburg, South Carolina
- Columbia College -- Columbia, South Carolina
- Wofford College -- Spartanburg, South Carolina

The SC Annual Conference is further subdivided into 12 smaller regions, called "districts," which provide further administrative functions for the operation of local churches in cooperation with each other. This structure is vital to Methodism, and is referred to as connectionalism. The Districts that comprise the South Carolina Conference are:

- Anderson
- Charleston
- Columbia
- Florence
- Greenville
- Greenwood
- Hartsville
- Marion
- Orangeburg
- Rock Hill
- Spartanburg
- Walterboro
