= Missouri Conference of the United Methodist Church =

United Methodist Church annual conference

The Missouri Conference is one of the 54 annual conferences of the United Methodist Church (UMC) in the United States. It is part of the South Central Jurisdiction. The conference oversees United Methodist congregations and ministries throughout the state of Missouri and is headquartered in Columbia, Missouri.

As of 2024, the Missouri Annual Conference reported 102,258 members, with an average worship attendance of 37,535 across its congregations.

Since 2016, the conference has been led by Bishop Robert Farr. Prior to Bishop Farr, Bishop Robert Schnase led the conference from 2004 to 2016.

== Districts ==
The Missouri Annual Conference is organized into five districts, each overseen by a district superintendent.

District	Superintendent
North Central	Mi Hyeon Lee
Northeast	Adrienne Denson Ewell
Northwest	Robin Bell
Southeast	Jon Thompson
Southwest	Mary Rodgers

== Affiliated Institutions ==
Central Methodist University (Fayette, Missouri)

The Missouri United Methodist Foundation
