= Janice Riggle Huie =

American United Methodist bishop

Janice Riggle Huie (born 15 December 1946) is a bishop of the United Methodist Church, elected in 1996 by the South Central Jurisdictional Conference. She has served in the church's Arkansas Annual (regional) Conference, 1996–2004, and in the Texas Annual Conference from 2004 until the end of her time as a Bishop.

== Life and career ==
She is married to Robert Huie. They have two sons: David (deceased) and Matthew. Bishop Huie served as the President of the United Methodist Council of Bishops until 2008, ostensibly the senior executive position of the United Methodist General Connection. She was succeeded by Bishop Greg Palmer of the Iowa Conference.

Huie was appointed to the Texas Annual Conference in 2004. The area is composed of 713 congregations and 290,855 members, spread throughout the eastern part of the US state of Texas. It includes Houston, Galveston, Beaumont, Texarkana, Longview, Tyler and College Station.

== Education ==
Huie completed undergraduate study at University of Texas (1969). She went on to earn a Th.M. at Perkins School of Theology and holds a D.Min. from Candler School of Theology in 1989.

== Ordained ministry ==
- Bishop, Houston Area, 2004–2016
- Bishop, Arkansas Area, 1996–2004
- District Superintendent, San Angelo District, 1993–1996
- Pastor, Manchaca United Methodist Church
- Pastor, Mason First United Methodist Church, Mason, Texas
- Pastor, St. Mark United Methodist Church, Austin, Texas
- Associate Pastor, University United Methodist Church, Austin, TX
- Marbridge Ranch

Campus Minister, University of Texas, Austin, TX

== See also ==
- List of bishops of the United Methodist Church
