= Michigan Area of The United Methodist Church =

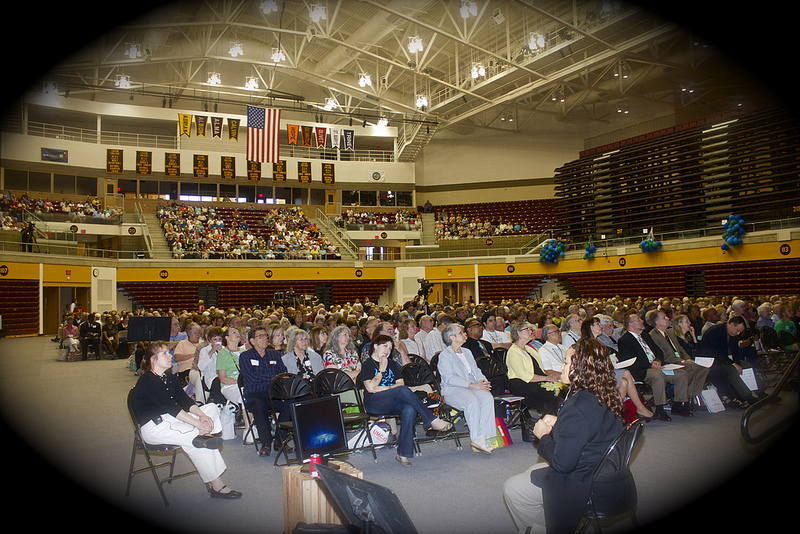
Meeting of the West Michigan Conference of The United Methodist Church

The Michigan Area Conference is one of 54 Annual Conferences of The United Methodist Church in the United States. They are one of 10 members of the North Central Jurisdiction. The Michigan Area Annual Conference represents nearly 600 local United Methodist churches with approximately 100,000 members in total. The Michigan Area Conference Center is located in Lansing.

== Mission ==
The mission of the conference is to, "Make Disciples of Jesus Christ for the Transformation of the world."

== Districts ==
The Michigan Area Annual Conference is organized into seven districts: Central Bay, East Winds, Greater Detroit, Greater Southwest, Heritage, Western Waters And Northern Skies.

District	Superintendent
Northern Skies	Kristi Hintz
Western Waters	Jodie Flessner
Central Bay	John Kasper
East Winds	John Kasper
Greater Southwest	Dean Prentiss
Heritage	Luann Rourke
Greater Detroit	Darryl Totty

== Michigan Area ==
The conference is led by Bishop David A. Bard, who was appointed in 2020 and re-appointed in 2024.

The Michigan Conference is the creation of two former United Methodist annual conferences: the Detroit Conference and the West Michigan Annual Conference. In June 2015, the two conferences voted overwhelmingly to create one single conference for the Michigan Area. The Michigan Conference began operating as one community on July 1, 2018 and began legally operating on January 1, 2019.

== Major Cities ==
Major Cities in the conference include: Detroit, Traverse City, Grand Rapids, Kalamazoo, Sault. Ste. Marie, Bay City, Lansing, and Mackinaw City.

== Colleges/Universities affiliated with UMC ==
Adrian College

Albion College
