= Sidney Locks =

American politician and Baptist minister (1949–2020)

Sidney Alvin Locks, Jr. (February 5, 1949 – May 29, 2020) was an American politician and Baptist minister.

Locks was born in Opelousas, Louisiana and graduated from J.S. Cook High School in 1967. He graduated from Wiley College, in Marshall, Texas, with a degree in religion and philosophy in 1971 and from Morehouse School of Religion in 1974. He served as a Baptist minister in several places including Sandy Grove Missionary Baptist Church in Lumberton, North Carolina. Locks served on the Lumberton School School Board and was a Democrat. Locks served in the North Carolina House of Representatives from 1982 to 1990 from Lumberton, North Carolina. Locks died in Greenville, North Carolina.
