= Central conferences (United Methodist Church) =

A central conference is one of seven annual conferences organized by the United Methodist Church outside of the United States. Composed of equal numbers of lay and clergy members, they connect annual conferences "for common ministry, adapt regulations as the conditions in the respective regions may require, and elect bishops... and fix their tenure."

In the mid 1900s, annual conferences outside of the US became autonomous, notably in the entirety of Latin America, as well as in most regions within Asia. Many of these autonomous churches remain affiliated with the United Methodist Church as affiliated autonomous or affiliated united churches, and continue to send non-voting delegates to the General Conference in the United States.

== List of central conferences ==
There are seven central conferences, taking place in three continents:

- Africa Central Conference
- Congo Central Conference
- West Africa Central Conference
- Central and Southern Europe Central Conference
- Germany Central Conference
- Northern Europe Central Conference
- Philippines Central Conference
