= Tracy Smith Malone =

American Bishop in the United Methodist Church

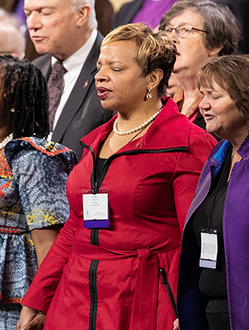
Bishop Malone praying with other Bishops

Tracy Smith Malone is an American bishop in the United Methodist Church. She has served as president of the United Methodist Council of Bishops since 2024. Malone is the first Black woman to serve as President of the Council of Bishops in the United Methodist Church. Malone has served as the Bishop of the Indiana Episcopal Area of the United Methodist Church since 2024, and she was Bishop of the Ohio East Episcopal Area from 2016 to 2024. After the departure of a longtime nursery school leader at a local church within the East Ohio Conference, Malone said, "We don't micromanage. Every local church, that pastor and those leaders, that's their prerogative as to which resources they use." At the 2022 Annual Conference, Malone advocated for legislative action against gun violence.
