= Larry M. Goodpaster =

Methodist bishop in the United States

Larry Martin Goodpaster (born April 23, 1948 in Memphis, Tennessee) is a bishop of the United Methodist Church, elected in 2000.

== Birth and family ==
Goodpaster was born April 23, 1948, in Memphis, Tennessee. He married Deborah Cox on September 26, 1971. They have two daughters: Amy (Mrs. Eric Bradley) and Lucy (Mrs. Josh Redding); and three grandchildren: Amelia Grace Bradley, Thomas Martin Bradley, and Audrey Elizabeth Bradley.

== Education ==
Goodpaster earned a B.A. degree from Millsaps College, Jackson, Mississippi (1970). He earned an M.Div. degree (1973) and a D.Min. degree (1982) from Candler School of Theology, Atlanta, Georgia. Goodpaster received honorary D.D. degrees from Birmingham-Southern College, Birmingham, Alabama (2002) and Huntingdon College, Montgomery, Alabama (2003).

== Ordained ministry ==
Goodpaster was ordained elder in the Mississippi Annual Conference of the U.M. Church in 1974. He served the following pastorates: Vaiden U.M. Charge, Vaiden, Mississippi (1973–75); Christ U.M.C., Indianola, Mississippi (1975–79); Associate Pastor of First U.M.C., Clarksdale, Mississippi (1979–81); Como U.M.C., Como, Mississippi (1981–85); Oxford-University U.M.C., Oxford, Mississippi (1985–92); and Central U.M.C., Meridian, Mississippi (1992–96). Goodpaster was appointed superintendent of the Tupelo District (1996–98), and then as senior pastor of the First U.M.C., Tupelo, Mississippi (1998–2000).

Goodpaster served on the U.M. General Commission on Religion and Race (1996–2000). He also served on the board of trustees of Millsaps College, and as chairperson of the board of trustees of Methodist Healthcare, Memphis, Tennessee. He was elected a delegate to Jurisdictional Conferences (1988-2000) and General Conference (1992–2000).

== Episcopal ministry ==
Goodpaster was elected to the episcopacy 13 July 2000 by the Southeastern Jurisdictional Conference of the U.M.C., the first U.M. bishop elected that year. He was assigned to the Alabama-West Florida Episcopal Area (the Alabama-West Florida Annual Conference) 14 July 2000. He was consecrated a bishop at a Service of Consecration held at Lake Junaluska, North Carolina, 15 July 2000.

As a bishop he served on these U.M. General Agencies: General Board of Church and Society (2000–04), General Board of Global Ministries (2004–08), and as president of the U.M. Development Fund Board of Directors. He also serves as president of the board of JustPeace: Center for Mediation and Conflict Transformation, Washington, D.C.

Goodpaster is on the board of trustees of Huntington College, Birmingham-Southern College, and Emory University (Atlanta, Georgia). Additional interests include service as with United Methodist Volunteers in Mission in trips to Jamaica and Russia; Habitat for Humanity, and Rotary International.

Goodpaster was unanimously elected April 19, 2008 to lead the United Methodist Church's Council of Bishops in two years. His tenure will begin in 2010 at the conclusion of the presidency of Iowa Bishop Gregory Palmer, who will assume the presidency from Bishop Janice Riggle Huie during the 2008 General Conference this spring.

Goodpaster was the bishop for the Western North Carolina Conference of The United Methodist Church. The assignment was announced Friday evening July 18, 2008, at the Southeastern Jurisdictional Conference meeting at Lake Junaluska, N.C. He succeeded Bishop J. Lawrence McCleskey, who retired August 31, 2008.

Goodpaster returned to Candler School of Theology in September of 2016 to serve as the Bishop-in-Residence, following Bishop Woodie W. White. He retired from this position at the end of the 2023-2024 academic term.

== Political activity ==
Prior to the May 8, 2012, general vote on the North Carolina Marriage Amendment (Amendment One) Goodpaster signed an on-line petition that opposed marriage being defined as one woman-one man.

== Selected writings ==
- Like a Breath of Fresh Air, (sermons for Pentecost), Lima, Ohio: C.S.S. Publishing, 1992.
- Sermons in Emphasis: A Preaching Journal.
- The Upper Room Disciplines, week of daily devotions, 2000 and 2004 editions.

== See also ==
- List of bishops of the United Methodist Church
- Biography of Larry M. Goodpaster
