= General Conference (Methodism) =

Christian legislative body

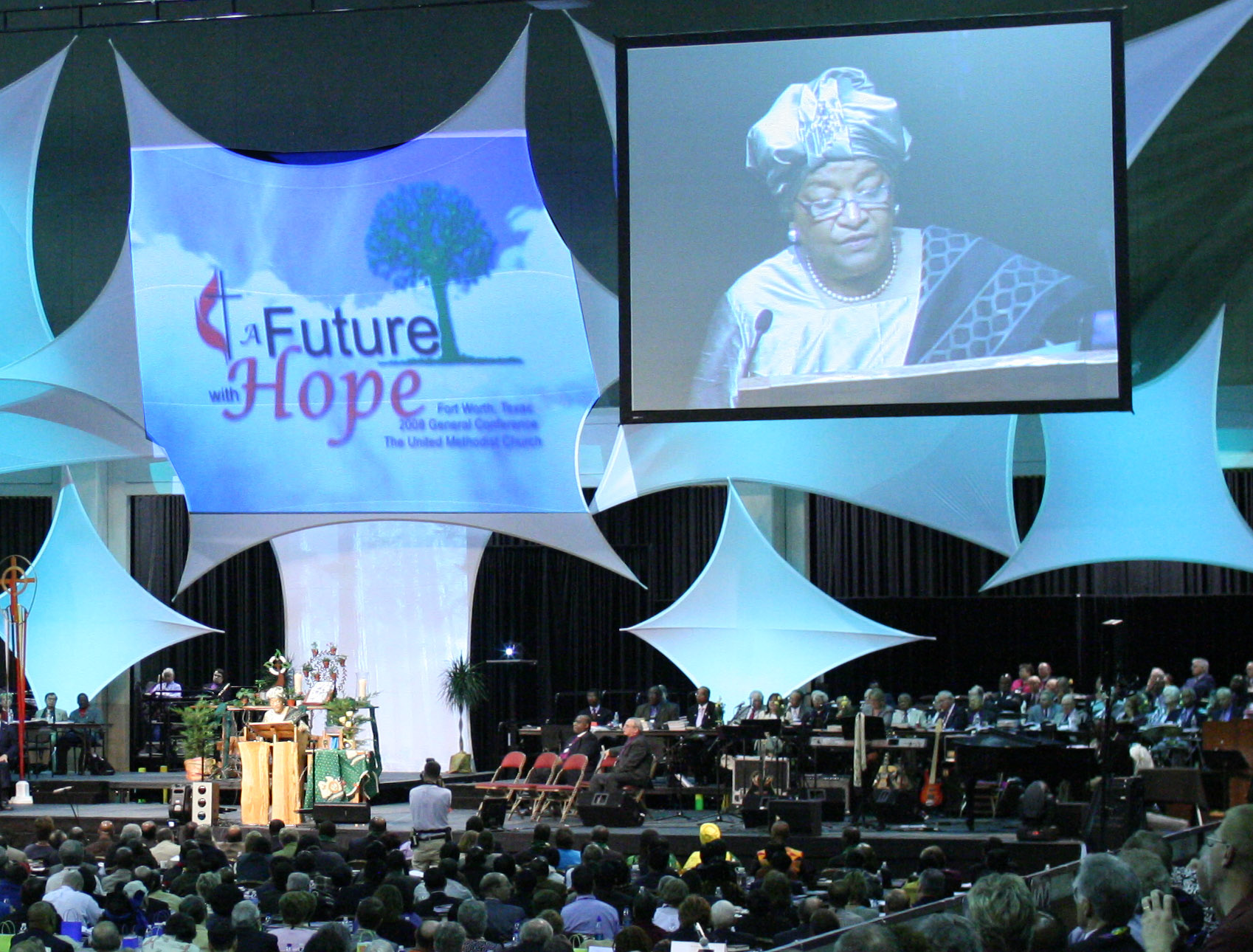
Ellen Johnson Sirleaf, President of Liberia, addresses the 2008 General Conference of the United Methodist Church

The General Conference, in several Methodist denominations, is the top legislative body for all matters within the denomination.

== Allegheny Wesleyan Methodist Connection ==
With regard to the membership of the General Conference of the Allegheny Wesleyan Methodist Connection, the 2014 Discipline, states:

The voting members of the General Conference shall be the same as those who are credentialed in paragraph 63 of the Discipline, and the annual conference and quadrennial conference business may be conducted concurrently. The general conference shall commence with the opening call to order, and final adjournment is at the sine die adjournment of annual conference.

== Evangelical Wesleyan Church ==
The General Conference of the Evangelical Wesleyan Church meets every four years and is "composed of the bishops and an equal number of ministerial and lay delegates to be elected by the annual conferences". It is the top legislative body in the Church.

== Free Methodist Church ==
¶200 of The Book of Discipline of the Free Methodist Church states that "The general conferences are the governing bodies of the Free Methodist Church. Each general conference shall consist of at least one annual conference or may, when necessary, make alternative provision for caring for annual conference functions as provided for in ¶220.2."

== United Methodist Church ==
The Book of Discipline and constitution of the United Methodist connection define the composition of the General Conference as no less than 600 and no more 1,000 delegates, half laity and half clergy. These delegates are elected by the Annual Conferences and several other specialized bodies within the structure of The United Methodist Church.

The General Conference meets on a quadrennial basis, that is, once every four years. Special sessions may be called by the Council of Bishops.

=== List of general conferences of The United Methodist Church ===
- 1968: Dallas, Texas (Uniting Conference)
- 1970: St. Louis, Missouri (Special Called Session)
- 1972: Atlanta, Georgia
- 1980: Indianapolis, Indiana
- 1984: Baltimore, Maryland
- 1988: St. Louis, Missouri
- 1992: Louisville, Kentucky
- 1996: Denver, Colorado
- 2000: Cleveland, Ohio
- 2004: Pittsburgh, Pennsylvania
- 2008: Fort Worth, Texas
- 2012: Tampa, Florida
- 2016: Portland, Oregon
- 2019: St. Louis, Missouri (Special Called Session)
- 2020: postponed due to COVID pandemic, was to have been in Minneapolis
- 2024: Charlotte, North Carolina (Officially Called the Postponed 2020 General Conference)
- 2028: Minneapolis, Minnesota

=== Legislative committees ===
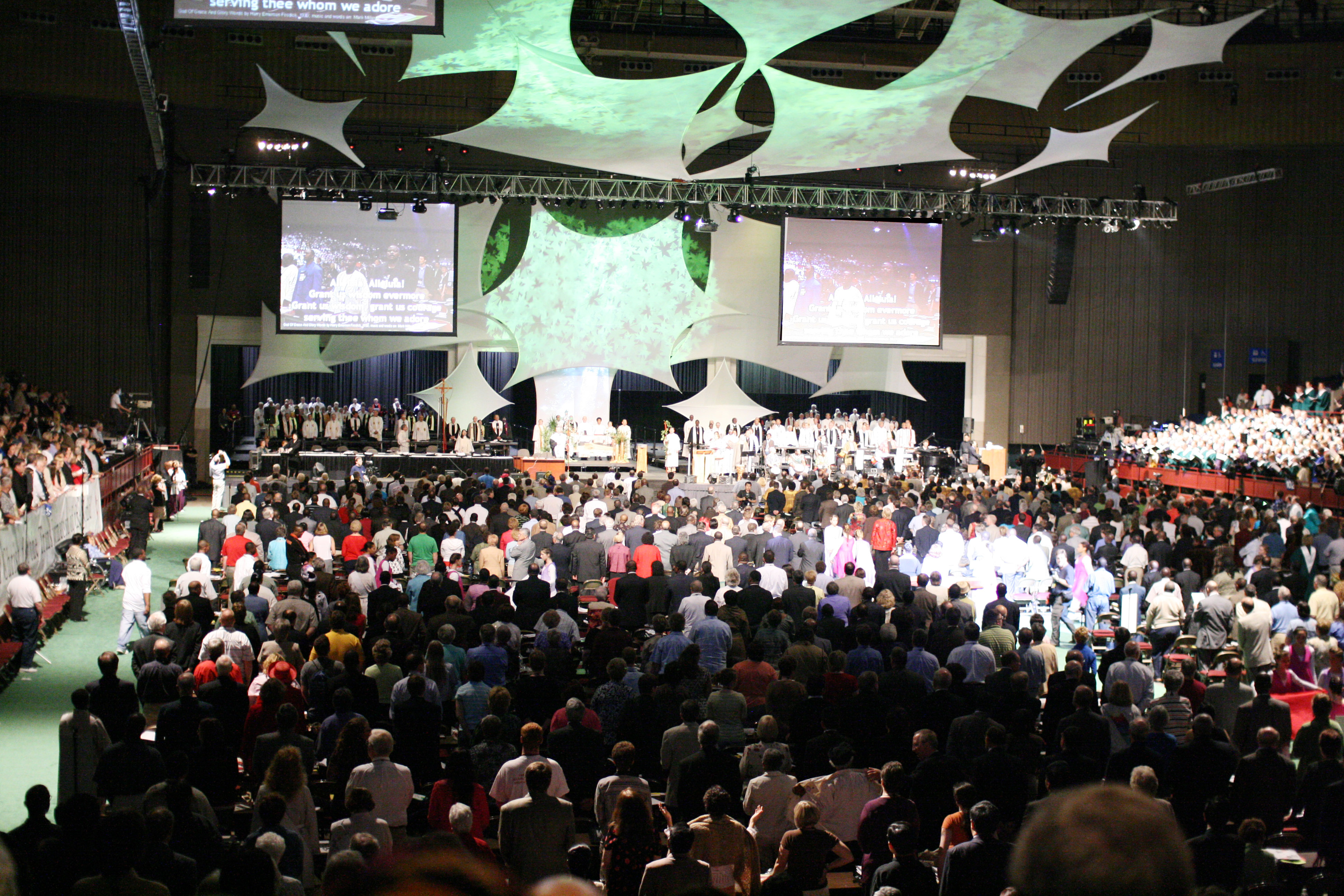
Opening Worship at 2008 General Conference

Petitions are assigned to legislative committees based on their content. Legislative committees elect committee leadership and then break into subcommittees to review and refine legislation. Subcommittees bring petitions before the entire committee with the recommendation to reject, adopt, or adopt as amended. During consideration by the entire committee, additional amendments may be made. Then, the entire committee votes to recommend to the General Conference (the almost 1000 delegates) what action should be taken on the legislation. No action is final until taken by the General Conference in plenary session.

Church and Society 1: This committee will receive all petitions and resolutions relating to the work and concerns of the Board of Church and Society and the Social Principles, with the exception of paragraphs in The Book of Discipline dealing with the nurturing community and the social community.

Church and Society 2: All petitions and resolutions relating to the nurturing community and the social community sections of the Social Principles will be referred to this committee.

Conferences: This committee shall receive all petitions and resolutions relating to the composition and activities of the General, jurisdictional, annual, provisional, missionary and district conferences.

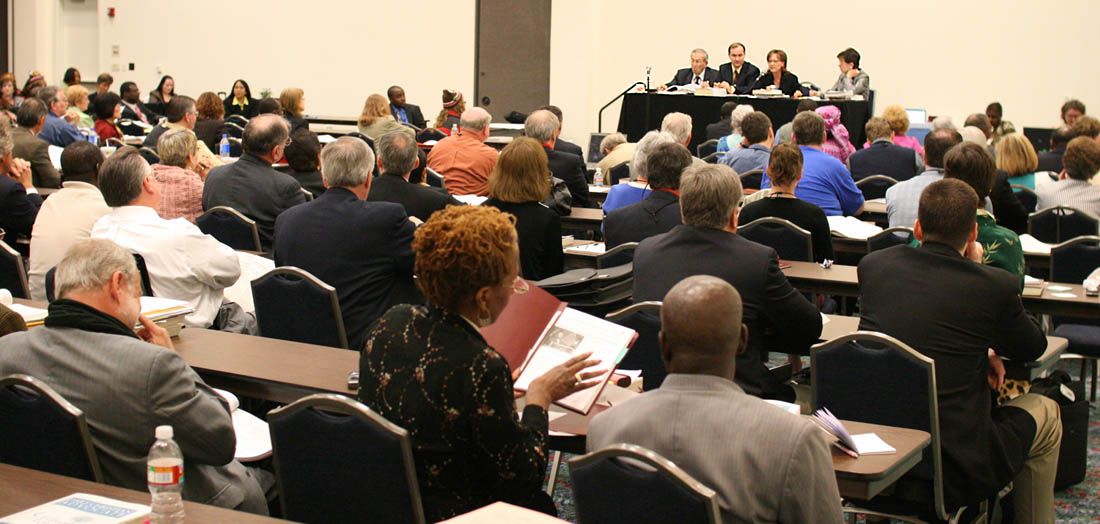
Ministry & Higher Ed. Committee at 2008 General Conference

Discipleship: All petitions and resolutions relating to the work and concerns of the Board of Discipleship shall be referred to this committee. (This committee is typically one of the committees with the highest number of members. Both the Discipleship and Ministry and Higher Education Committees usually approach 100 members. 2008 Discipleship Committee members were approximately 65% laity.)

Faith and Order: All petitions relating to "Doctrinal Standards and Our Theological Task," "The Ministry of All Christians" and the meaning of ordination and conference membership will be referred to this committee.

Financial Administration: This committee shall receive all petitions and resolutions relating to the work and concerns of the Council on Finance and Administration, the Board of Pension and Health Benefits, and the United Methodist Publishing House. The budget and recommendations prepared by the General Council on Finance and Administration shall be submitted to this committee for study and review. Thereafter, when the General Council on Finance and Administration presents its report to the General Conference for action, the committee shall present its recommendations and may propose amendments.

General Administration: Petitions and resolutions relating to the work and concerns of the Connectional Table shall be referred to this committee. The report of the Connectional Table shall be submitted to this committee for study and review. After the Connectional Table presents its report to the General Conference for action, the committee shall present its recommendations and may propose amendments.

Global Ministries: All petitions and resolutions relating to the work and concerns of the Board of Global Ministries shall be referred to this committee.

Independent Commissions: This committee shall receive all petitions and resolutions relating to commissions and ecumenical concerns. The commissions include Archives and History, Christian Unity and Interreligious Concerns, Communications, Religion and Race, the Status and Role of Women, and United Methodist Men. Ecumenical concerns relate to the denomination's membership in or relationship with the World Methodist Council, the National Council of Churches, other councils and consultations of churches, and the American Bible Society.

Judicial Administration: All petitions and resolutions relating to judiciary concerns and investigations, trials and appeals are handled by this committee.

Local Church: This committee will receive all petitions and resolutions relating to the organization of the local church and its membership, programs, boards, councils, commissions and committees. The committee will also consider petitions relating to local church property.

Ministry and Higher Education: All petitions and resolutions relating to the work and concerns of ordained ministries, higher education, seminaries, and the Division of Chaplaincy and Related Ministries of the Board of Higher Education and Ministry shall be referred to this committee. (This committee is typically the most coveted committee for clergy delegates and is one of the committees with the highest number of members. Committee members were approximately 65% clergy in 2008.)

Superintendency: Petitions and resolutions relating to the work and concerns of superintendents shall be referred to this committee. In addition, a Commission on Central Conference Affairs will handle legislative proposals affecting central conferences.

== See also ==
- Conferences of the United Methodist Church
- Annual conferences within Methodism
- Jurisdictional Conferences (United Methodist Church)
- Central Conferences (United Methodist Church)
- List of bishops of the United Methodist Church
- Episcopal area (United Methodist Church)
- Methodist Church of Great Britain § Conference
