= Justin Nzoyisaba =

Bishop Justin Nzoyisaba is the Legal Representative and the Bishop of the United Methodist Church of Burundi. The Reverend Justin Nzoyisaba was Consecrated to the episcopate in full apostolic succession on Sunday, December 7, 2008, by bishop Jupa Kaberuka of the United Methodist Church of Rwanda (Bishop of the Christian Communion International), Bishop Dr. Elie Buconyori of the Free Methodist Church of Burundi, Bishop Pascal Benimana of the Moravian Church of Burundi, Bishop Dieudonne Nitonde of the Charismatic Episcopal Church of Burundi and Bishop Simeon Nzishura of the African Protestant Evangelical Elim Church.
