= License to Preach =

A License to Preach in Methodist churches is the official authorization of a person to preach the Gospel and to do other tasks of ministry so authorized (for ordained ministers, this includes administering the sacraments). Such a license is usually issued by a District Superintendent or Bishop and was required to be reaffirmed at regular intervals (usually annually).

In the United Methodist Church today this practice is continued in the issuing of a Local Pastor's License, authorizing a person to preach, administer the Sacraments, and do other tasks of ministry in the local church to which such person is appointed. In the Evangelical Wesleyan Church, the District Conference has the authority to dispense a license to preach.

== See also ==
- Methodist local preacher
