= Conferences in Methodism =

The following is a list of the conferences in many Methodist Churches, such as The United Methodist Church and Evangelical Wesleyan Church.

== Conferences ==
There are several kinds of conferences in Methodism:

- General Conference is the highest deliberative body for the United Methodist Church, the Allegheny Wesleyan Methodist Church, among others.
- Jurisdictional Conferences in the U.S.; and
- Central Conferences outside the U.S. elect and assign bishops in their region and comprise
- Annual Conferences, the basic organizational unit in the denomination.
- District Conference, Annual conferences are further divided into districts, each served by a district superintendent.
- Charge Conference, a charge is one or more churches served by a minister under appointment by the bishop.

=== 2025 reorganization ===
In November 2025, the United Methodist Church ratified Worldwide Regionalization, a series of Constitutional Amendments passed at the 2024 General Conference to restructure the UMC designed to give equal autonomy to various regions of the church, renaming former Central (non-US) Conferences to Regional Conferences and the creation of a U.S. Regional Conference on an equal basis, which many United Methodists believe would help decolonize the church and aid global unity.
