= Episcopal area (United Methodist Church) =

An episcopal area in the United Methodist Church (UMC) is a basic unit of this denomination. It is a region presided over by a resident bishop that is similar to a diocese in other Christian denominations. Each annual conference in the UMC is within a single episcopal area; some episcopal areas include more than one annual conference. Episcopal areas are found in the United States as well as internationally. In some cases, such as the Western Jurisdiction of the US as well as some places internationally, an episcopal area covers a very large territory (several US states or countries).

== Beginnings ==
In the early histories of the denominations which formed the UMC, bishops were elected at-large, not having specific "residential responsibilities", but expected to exercise episcopal supervision throughout the denomination (including internationally), traveling throughout "the connection". Beginning with the General Conference of 1872, the Methodist Episcopal Church (MEC) designated certain cities as proper locations for episcopal residences. The objective was to secure for each part of the church more certain and constant episcopal supervision. Each bishop was therefore assigned to one of these residences by his colleagues.

The Methodist Episcopal Church, South (MECS) began to observe a similar practice to that of the Methodist Episcopal Church. The Methodist Protestant Church (MPC) had no bishops until the eve of the 1939 reunion with the MEC and MECS churches, when MPC delegates elected two bishops to serve in the new Methodist Church. The Evangelical Church and the Church of the United Brethren in Christ placed their bishops over larger, multi-state regions, primarily because of the lower density of their respective congregations.

== 1939 Methodist reunion ==
With the merger of three Methodist denominations in 1939 to form the Methodist Church, jurisdictions were established, in which bishops were elected by jurisdictional conferences and assigned to episcopal areas within each jurisdiction (to itinerate within thereafter). Methodist bishops continued to serve as episcopal leaders of the entire denomination, but with specific residential and presidential duties to the annual conferences within their areas.

Also established in 1939 was the Central Jurisdiction, which provided for African-American bishops to preside over African-American annual conferences scattered throughout the US. These conferences were not necessarily geographically contiguous (as are the other five jurisdictions).

== 1968 Methodist–EUB merger ==
The Central Jurisdiction began to be dismantled in the 1960s, integrating African-American bishops into the five geographical jurisdictions. By the 1968 merger of the Methodist Church and the Evangelical United Brethren Church, all bishops were assigned to these jurisdictions, and within them, each to one episcopal area.

== Central conferences ==
One exception is the central conference system outside the US. These conferences also elect their own bishops, often limiting them to terms (though most also provide for subsequent lifetime election, as in the US). Nevertheless, these central conference bishops are also assigned to episcopal areas within each central conference. The bishops therein elected also become members of the Council of Bishops of the UMC.
