= Jurisdictional conferences (Methodism) =

The Jurisdictional Conferences are a collection of Annual Conferences in various Methodist denominations.

== By Methodist denomination ==
=== Free Methodist Church ===
The Book of Discipline of the Free Methodist Church notes that "annual conferences may petition the general conference to which they belong for status as a jurisdictional conference".

=== United Methodist Church ===
The constitution of The United Methodist Church established five jurisdictions within the United States and it specifies which states will be a part of each. Each jurisdiction is responsible for boundaries of annual conferences within those states and electing its own bishops.

Equal numbers of laity and clergy, elected by the annual conferences, serve as delegates to the Jurisdictional Conferences, which are held once every four years in the same years as the General Conference meets.

While Central conferences—groups of annual conferences in Africa, Europe and the Philippines—follow similar procedures to elect and assign bishops, some meet in different years.

At present, each jurisdiction having 500,000 church members or fewer is entitled to six bishops. Another is elected for each additional 320,000 members. More may be elected if episcopal areas (one or more annual conferences) average more than 55,000 square miles (140,000 km^{2}).

Within each jurisdiction a committee on episcopacy (one clergy and one lay person from each annual conference) reviews the bishops' work and assigns them to their areas. The Jurisdictional Conference may affirm or reject the assignments and request new ones.

The Book of Discipline 2012 requires bishops to move after two four-year terms in the same area unless a two-thirds majority of both the jurisdictional committee on episcopacy and jurisdictional conference approves a third term. Attempts over the last few quadrennia to lengthen episcopal terms in any one conference have not been supported by General Conferences.

All assignments for active U.S. bishops begin on Sept. 1 following the jurisdictional conference.

In rare cases, an Inter-jurisdictional Committee on Episcopacy, elected by General Conference delegates, can transfer bishops across jurisdictional lines if the bishops and the jurisdictions consent.

Candidates are generally nominated by an annual conference or endorsed by jurisdictional conference delegates. Any United Methodist ordained elder may be elected bishop by any jurisdictional conference.

Each jurisdiction establishes the percentage of votes needed for election. Voting by ballot continues until someone receives the required number of votes.

Newly elected bishops are consecrated in worship services at the end of each jurisdictional conference, through the laying-on-of-hands of the Bishops present.

As of the 2012 General Conference, Bishops are required to retire if they reach age 68 on or before July 1 in the year of jurisdictional conferences. This ensures that no bishop is serving under appointment beyond their 72nd Birthday (which is currently the age of Mandatory Retirement in the UMC).

=== List of Jurisdictional Conferences ===
The conferences are also grouped into jurisdictions that appoint bishops for conferences within that jurisdiction. These jurisdictions are listed as follows:

- North Central Jurisdiction
- Northeastern Jurisdiction
- South Central Jurisdiction
- Southeastern Jurisdiction
- Western Jurisdiction

== See also ==
- Conferences in Methodism
