= District superintendent (Methodism) =

Religious title

A district superintendent (DS), also known as a presiding elder, in many Methodist denominations, is a minister (specifically an elder) who serves in a supervisory position over a geographic "district" of churches (varying in size) providing spiritual and administrative leadership to those churches and their pastors.

District superintendents were once called presiding elders and this is the term still employed in some Methodist denominations such as the African Methodist Episcopal Church, the African Methodist Episcopal Zion Church, and the Christian Methodist Episcopal Church. In the 20th century, in the Methodist Episcopal Church (the forerunner of the United Methodist Church) and the Free Methodist Church, the term district superintendent supplanted the former term.

== Denominational statements ==
=== African Methodist Episcopal Church ===
In the African Methodist Episcopal Church, "Presiding Elders are ministers who have been ordained elders, who are appointed by the bishop to supervise the work of a given number of churches and ministers within an annual conference."

=== Free Methodist Church ===
The Book of Discipline of the Free Methodist Church says that "Bishops, together with superintendents, give oversight to the ordained ministry through appointment, guidance and discipline."

=== Primitive Methodist Church ===
The Book of Discipline of the Primitive Methodist Church states that "The District Superintendent is the highest authority within the District and is responsible for the harmony and unity within the district. He shall provide leadership and direction for denominational activities and policies within his area."

=== United Methodist Church ===
According to the Book of Discipline of the United Methodist Church "The offices of bishop and district superintendent exist in The United Methodist Church as particular ministries. Bishops are elected and district superintendents are appointed from the group of elders who are ordained to be ministers of Word, Sacrament, and Order and thereby participate in the ministry of Christ, in sharing a royal priesthood which has apostolic roots (I Peter 2:9; John 21:15-17; Acts 20:28; I Peter 5:2-3; I Timothy 3:1-7)."

The length of office for a district superintendent in the UMC is usually up to six years but he may serve eight consecutive years. She or he may serve no more than eight years in any consecutive eleven years and no more than fourteen years in her or his lifetime.
