= Annual conferences within Methodism =

Regional body that governs much of the life of the "connectional church"

An annual conference is a regional decision-making body within various Methodist denominations. Conferences are a key characteristic of the connexional (connectional) system of government in Methodism. Annual conferences are composed primarily of the clergy members and a lay member or members from each charge (a charge is one or more churches served by a minister under appointment by the bishop). Each conference is a geographical division. In general, the smaller states in the United States hold one conference each, while larger states often include two or more conferences. Several annual conferences are held in other nations as well.

== Allegheny Wesleyan Methodist Connection ==
With regard to the membership of Annual Conferences of the Allegheny Wesleyan Methodist Connection, the 2014 Book of Discipline states:

The voting membership of the conference shall include the following: all elders on the stationed, reserve, and superannuated lists; all conference preachers elected to elders’ orders; all conference preachers serving as pastors of organized Allegheny Wesleyan Methodist churches; lay delegates elected by organized Allegheny Wesleyan Methodist churches as provided in The Discipline. In addition, the annual conference shall include such nonvoting members as The Discipline shall provide. The principle of equal representation of the ministry and laity in the annual conference shall be maintained. In transacting the business of the annual conference the ministers and lay members shall deliberate as one body; but on the final vote on any question, at the call of one-fourth of the members, the house shall divide, and the ministers and lay members shall vote separately; and it shall require a majority vote of each branch to pass any question upon which the division has been called.

== Evangelical Wesleyan Church ==
In the Evangelical Wesleyan Church, two annual conferences exist, the Eastern Annual Conference and the Western Annual Conference. It is presided over by a bishop. Annual Conferences in the EWC are invested with the responsibility of reviewing candidates for holy orders.

== Free Methodist Church ==
¶200 of The Book of Discipline of the Free Methodist Church states that:

Annual conferences are the normative Free Methodist organization at the regional level that provides for reasonable spans of care for ministers and congregations, as well as the structure for effective kingdom expansion. Each annual conference in the Free Methodist Church shall be a member of a general conference.

== Global Methodist Church ==
The Global Methodist Church launched in 2022 following significant differences of opinion and doctrine within the United Methodist Church regarding issues of human sexuality. Numerous United Methodist Congregations voted to disaffiliate from their UMC Annual Conferences and affiliate with the GMC. Structurally, the GMC remains very similar to the UMC.

== United Methodist Church ==
=== Role and composition ===
The annual conference is the primary unit of denominational government. Regional groups of conferences within the United States make up the Jurisdictional Conferences, and outside the United States they make up the Central Conferences. The entire group of all annual conferences makes up the General Conference which meets every four years. Only the General Conference can speak officially for the church.

The annual conference is composed of an equal number of clergy and laity. Each charge conference elects as many lay members to the annual conference as they have ministers appointed to that charge. In most cases that is one. The Lay Member must, at the time of election, be a professing member of the United Methodist Church for at least two years and four years an active participant in the church. This requirement may be waived for those under 30 years old in the Central Conferences, and is waived for newly organized churches. The annual conference also consists of a number of "at-large" members, also known as "additional lay members," the number of at-large members being the number necessary (after the members elected by charge conferences are seated) so that the laity and the clergy are equal in number. First seated among at-large members are lay persons holding certain lay positions or offices designated by the Book of Discipline or by the annual conference itself. Among those officers are the lay leaders of the conference and each of the districts within the conference, as well as the Conference presidents of the United Methodist Men, United Methodist Women, the young adult organization, the college student organization and the youth fellowship. Also all the diaconal ministers, home missioners and the deaconesses under Episcopal appointment are lay members. When there are multiple congregations in a charge conference, members from each congregation in that charge are encouraged to become at-large members. After all lay members who hold their seat by virtue of office or position are seated and if additional lay members are needed the annual conference will elect any active United Methodist lay person who is interested in holding that position.

Among their other duties the annual conference elects delegates to the general, jurisdictional and central conferences, and votes on amendments to the church constitution. Its executive committee, composed of its ordained clergy members, authorizes the ordination of clergy, also disciplines and hold accountable its members.

Within the United States, conferences are grouped into the jurisdictional areas:

- North Central
- Northeastern
- South Central
- Southeastern
- Western

Outside the United States the church is divided into seven central conferences (similar to US Jurisdictions):

- Africa
- West Africa
- Congo
- Central and Southern Europe
- Germany
- Northern Europe and Eurasia
- Philippines (Includes Nepal)

Each jurisdiction or Central Conference may comprise Episcopal Areas which are groups of Annual Conferences who share a single bishop. In the US, this is often a precursor to a reorganization or combining of multiple Annual Conferences into one due to churches closing or disaffiliating.

=== List of annual conferences ===
The following is a list of the episcopal areas and annual conferences of the United Methodist Church and the current Resident Bishops in each Episcopal Area as of 2023.

==== United States North Central Jurisdiction ====
- Dakotas/Minnesota Episcopal Area – Bishop Lanette Plambeck
  - Minnesota
  - Dakotas
- Iowa – Bishop Kennetha Bigham-Tsai
- Illinois Great Rivers – Bishop Frank Beard (Illinois)
- Northern Illinois – Bishop Sally Dyck (Chicago)
- Wisconsin – Bishop Hee-Soo Jung
- Michigan – Bishop David Alan Bard
- Indiana – Bishop Julius C. Trimble
- West Ohio – Bishop Gregory V. Palmer
- East Ohio – Bishop Tracy S. Malone

==== United States Northeastern Jurisdiction ====
- New England – Bishop Thomas J. Bickerton
- Susquehanna – Bishop Hector A. Burgos Nunez
- Western Pennsylvania – Bishop Sandra Steiner Ball
- Greater New Jersey – Bishop Cynthia Moore-Koikoi
- Eastern Pennsylvania – Bishop Cynthia Moore-Koikoi
- New York – Bishop Thomas J. Bickerton
- Upper New York – Bishop Hector A. Burgos Nuñez
- Baltimore/Washington – Bishop Latrelle Easterling
- Peninsula Delaware – Bishop Latrelle Easterling
- West Virginia – Bishop Debra Wallace-Padgett

==== United States Southeastern Jurisdiction ====
Sources:

- Alabama-West Florida – Bishop Jonathan Holston
- South Georgia – Bishop Robin Dease
- Florida – Bishop Tom Berlin
- North Alabama – Bishop Jonathan Holston
- Holston – Bishop Bishop Debra Wallace-Padgett
- Kentucky – Bishop David Graves
- Central Appalachian Missionary – Bishop David Graves
- Mississippi – Bishop Sharma Lewis
- North Carolina – Bishop Connie Mitchell Shelton
- North Georgia – Bishop Robin Dease
- South Carolina – Bishop Leonard E. Fairley
- Tennessee-Western Kentucky – Bishop David Graves
- Virginia – Bishop Sue Haupert-Johnson
- Western North Carolina – Bishop Ken Carter

==== United States South Central Jurisdiction ====
- Great Plains – Bishop Dr. David Wilson (Kansas/Nebraska)
- Louisiana – Bishop Dr. Delores (Dee) J. Williamston
- Missouri – Bishop Robert Farr
- Arkansas – Bishop Laura Merrill
- Texas – Bishop Cynthia Fierro-Harvey (Houston)
- Rio Texas – Bishop Robert Schnase (San Antonio)
- New Mexico/Northwest Texas Episcopal Area – Bishop W. Earl Bledsoe
  - New Mexico
  - Northwest Texas
- North/Central Texas Episcopal Area – Bishop Ruben Saenz Jr.
  - North Texas
  - Central Texas
- Oklahoma Episcopal Area – Bishop James G. Nunn
  - Oklahoma-Indian Missionary
  - Oklahoma

==== United States Western Jurisdiction ====
- Greater Northwest Episcopal Area – Bishop Cedrick D. Bridgeforth
  - Alaska
  - Oregon-Idaho
  - Pacific Northwest
- San Francisco Episcopal Area – Interim Bishop Sally Dyck
  - California-Nevada
- Los Angeles Episcopal Area – Bishop Dottie Escobedo-Frank
  - California Pacific
- Mountain Sky Episcopal Area – Bishop Karen P. Oliveto
  - Mountain Sky
- Phoenix Episcopal Area – Bishop Carlo A. Rapanut
  - Desert Southwest

The Western Jurisdiction is also served by the following active and retired bishops that lead other functions within the jurisdiction:

- Bishop Minerva G. Carcaño
- Bishop Grant J. Hagiya (Retired)
- Bishop Elaine J. W. Stanovsky (Retired)

==== Africa Central Conference ====
Bishops are elected to four-year term and re-elected for life

- Eastern Angola Episcopal Area – Bishop Jose Quipungo
  - East Angola Annual Conference
- Western Angola Episcopal Area – Bishop Gaspar Jose Domingos
  - West Angola Annual Conference
  - Namibia District
- East Africa Episcopal Area – Bishop Daniel Wandabula
  - East Africa Annual Conference (Kenya, Rwanda, South Sudan, Uganda)
  - Burundi Annual Conference
- Mozambique Episcopal Area – Bishop Filipe Nhanala
  - Mozambique North Annual Conference
  - Mozambique South Annual Conference
  - South Africa Annual Conference
- Zimbabwe Episcopal Area – Bishop Eben Nhiwatiwa
  - East Zimbabwe Annual Conference
  - West Zimbabwe Annual Conference
  - Malawi Provisional Annual Conference

==== West Africa Central Conference ====
bishops are elected for life

- Côte d'Ivoire Episcopal Area – Bishop Benjamin Boni
  - Côte d'Ivoire Annual Conference
  - Cameroon Mission Area
  - Senegal Mission Area
- Liberia Episcopal Area – Bishop Samuel J. Quire Jr.
  - Liberia Annual Conference
- Nigeria Episcopal Area – Bishop John Wesley Yohanna
  - Central Nigeria Annual Conference (Gwaten)
  - Northern Nigeria Annual Conference (Pero)
  - Southern Nigeria Annual Conference
- Sierra Leone Episcopal Area – Bishop Warner Brown (Interim)
  - Sierra Leone Annual Conference

==== Congo Central Conference ====
Bishops are elected to four-year term and re-elected for life

- Central Congo Episcopal Area – Bishop Daniel Onashuyaka Lunge
  - Central Congo Annual Conference
  - Kasai Annual Conference
  - West Congo Annual Conference
- East Congo Episcopal Area – Bishop Gabriel Yemba Unda
  - East Congo Annual Conference
  - Kivu Annual Conference
  - Oriental and Equator Annual Conference
- North Katanga Episcopal Area – Bishop Mande Muyombo
  - North Katanga Annual Conference
  - Tanganyika Annual Conference
  - Tanzania Annual Conference
- South Congo Episcopal Area – Bishop Kasap Owan
  - Lukoshi Annual Conference
  - North-West Katanga Annual Conference
  - South Congo Annual Conference
  - South-West Katanga Annual Conference
  - Zambia Annual Conference

==== Central and Southern Europe Central Conference ====
- Central and Southern Europe Episcopal Area – Bishop Patrick Streiff
  - Austria Provisional Annual Conference
  - Bulgaria-Romania Provisional Annual Conference
  - Czechia-Slovakia Annual Conference
  - Hungary Provisional Annual Conference
  - Poland Annual Conference
  - Serbia-Macedonia Provisional Annual Conference
  - Switzerland-France-North Africa Annual Conference

==== Germany Central Conference ====
- Germany Episcopal Area – Bishop Harald Rückert
  - Germany East Annual Conference
  - Germany North Annual Conference
  - Germany South Annual Conference

==== Northern Europe and Eurasia Central Conference ====
- Eurasia Episcopal Area – Bishop Eduard Khegay
  - Central Russia Annual Conference
  - Eastern Russia and Central Asia Provisional Annual Conference
  - Northwest Russia Provisional Annual Conference
  - Southern Russia Provisional Annual Conference
- Nordic and Baltic Episcopal Area – Bishop Christian Alsted
  - Denmark Annual Conference
  - Estonia Annual Conference (Includes Latvia and Lithuania Districts)
  - Finland-Finnish Annual Conference
  - Finland-Swedish Annual Conference
  - Ukraine-Moldova Provisional Annual Conference
  - Norway Annual Conference

==== Philippines Central Conference ====
- Baguio Episcopal Area – Bishop Peter Torio
  - Central Luzon Philippines Annual Conference
  - North Central Philippines Annual Conference
  - Northeast Luzon Philippines Annual Conference
  - Northeast Philippines Annual Conference
  - Northern Philippines Annual Conference
  - Northwest Philippines Annual Conference
  - Pangasinan Philippines Annual Conference
  - Tarlac Philippines Annual Conference
  - Nepal
- Manila Episcopal Area – Bishop Rodolfo (Rudy) Alfonso Juan
  - Bulacan Philippines Annual Conference
  - Middle Philippines Annual Conference
  - Palawan Philippines Annual Conference
  - Philippines Annual Conference
  - Quezon City Philippines Annual Conference
  - Rizal Philippines Annual Conference
  - South Nueva Ecija Philippines Annual Conference
  - Southern Tagalog Provisional Philippines Annual Conference
  - Pampango Philippines Annual Conference
  - West Middle Philippines Annual Conference
  - Southwest Philippines Annual Conference
- Davao Episcopal Area – Bishop Ciriaco (Cery) Q. Francisco
  - Bicol Provisional Philippines Annual Conference
  - East Mindanao Philippines Annual Conference
  - Mindanao Philippines Annual Conference
  - Northwest Mindanao Philippines Annual Conference
  - Visayas Philippines Annual Conference

== See also ==
- Bishops in Methodism
- Conferences in Methodism
- General Conference (Methodism)
- Jurisdictional Conferences (United Methodist Church)
- Central Conferences (United Methodist Church)
- List of bishops of the United Methodist Church
- Episcopal area (United Methodist Church)
