= William Pope =

William, Willie, Will or Bill Pope may refer to:

- William Pope, 1st Earl of Downe (1573–1631)
- William Pope (naturalist) (1811–1903), English-born naturalist and painter
- William Burt Pope (1822–1903), English Christian theologian
- William Henry Pope (Canadian politician) (1825–1879), Canadian lawyer, politician and judge
- William Henry Pope (U.S. politician) (1847–1913), Texas state senator
- William Hayes Pope (1870–1916), U.S. federal judge
- William Jackson Pope (1870–1939), English chemist
- Willie Pope (1918–2010), American baseball player
- J. William Pope (1938–2014), member of the Tennessee House of Representatives
- Bill Pope (born 1952), American cinematographer
- William Pope.L (born 1955), American performance artist
- William Kenneth Pope (died 1989), bishop of the Methodist Church
- Will Pope, fictional character in TNT's The Closer
