= Perkins School of Theology =

University in Texas USA founded 1911

- Type: Private; Seminary
- Established: 1911
- Parent institution: Southern Methodist University
- Affiliations: United Methodist Church (since 1939); Formerly Methodist Episcopal Church
- Dean: Bryan P. Stone
- Students: 277
- Location: Dallas, Texas, United States; 32.839394°N 96.785867°W
- Website: www.smu.edu/perkins

Perkins School of Theology is one of Southern Methodist University's three original schools and is located in Dallas, Texas. The theology school was renamed in 1945 to honor benefactors Joe J. and Lois Craddock Perkins of Wichita Falls, Texas. Degree programs include the Master of Divinity (M.Div.), Master of Sacred Music, Master of Theological Studies (MTS), Master of Arts in Ministry, Master of Theology (Th.M.), Doctor of Ministry (D.Min.), and Doctor of Pastoral Music as well as the Ph.D., in cooperation with The Graduate Program in Religious Studies at SMU’s Dedman College of Humanities and Sciences. It is one of only five university-related theological institutions of the United Methodist Church, and one of the denomination's 13 seminaries, offering opportunities for interdisciplinary learning, and accredited by the Association of Theological Schools (ATS). There is a hybrid-extension program in Houston-Galveston.

== Bridwell Library ==
The Bridwell Library is one of the leading theological research collections in the United States. It is named for its benefactor Joseph Sterling Bridwell, an oilman and rancher who was a neighbor of the Perkinses in Wichita Falls.

The Bridwell Library houses a religious studies research collection of more than 400,000 volumes and collections of rare books, Bibles, and manuscripts. Since 2021, it has also been the home of the World Methodist Museum, formerly in Lake Junaluska, NC. In 2022, Bridwell Press was founded under the auspices of the library, with the aim of revitalizing and advancing academic publishing at SMU. In 2024, Bridwell was the recipient of a major grant from the Lilly Endowment. This grant supports the establishment of a major historical paper making studio and printing press lab in the lower lever of the library, which will make Bridwell Library one of the top destinations for historic paper making, printing, and book arts in North America. The lab, studio, and a new antiquities museum are set to open at the beginning of 2027.

== Specialized study ==
Students in the M.Div., M.A.M., and M.T.S. degree programs may choose from the following areas of concentration: African American Church Studies, Anglican Studies, Church/Nonprofit Management (with SMU's Cox School of Business), Hispanic Studies, Pastoral Care, Social Innovation and Nonprofit Engagement (with SMU's Meadows School of the Arts), Urban Ministry, Women's and Gender Studies. Other programs of interest include spiritual formation and Global Theological Education.

== Notable alumni/ae ==
- Kathleen Baskin-Ball
- Kirbyjon Caldwell
- Minerva G. Carcaño
- Adam Hamilton (pastor)
- John Wesley Hardt
- Zan Wesley Holmes Jr
- Janice Riggle Huie
- Hiram "Doc" Jones
- Charles R. Moore (minister)
- Bryan Stone
- Cecil Williams

== Notable faculty ==
- Steve Long, Cary M. Maguire University Professor of Ethics
- Bruce D. Marshall, Lehman Professor of Christian Doctrine
- Alyce M. McKenzie, Le Van Professor of Preaching and Worship
- Rebekah Miles, Susanna Wesley Centennial Professor of Practical Theology and Ethics

=== Emeritus and deceased faculty members ===
- William J. Abraham, Albert Cook Outler Professor of Wesley Studies
- Joseph L. Allen, Yale University, Professor Emeritus of Ethics
- William S. Babcock, Yale University, Professor Emeritus of Church History
- Jouette M. Bassler, Yale University, Professor Emerita of New Testament
- Victor Paul Furnish, Yale University, University Distinguished Professor Emeritus of New Testament
- John Wesley Hardt, Southern Methodist University, Bishop in Residence Emeritus
- Kenneth W. Hart, University of Cincinnati, Professor Emeritus of Sacred Music
- John C. Holbert, Southern Methodist University, Professor Emeritus of Homiletics
- Leroy T. Howe, Yale University, Professor Emeritus of Pastoral Theology
- James E. Kirby, Drew University, Professor Emeritus of Church History
- H. Neill McFarland, Columbia University, Professor Emeritus of History of Religion
- Richard D. Nelson, Union Theological Seminary, Professor Emeritus of Biblical Hebrew and Old Testament Interpretation
- Schubert M. Ogden, University of Chicago, University Distinguished Professor Emeritus of Theology
- Klaus Penzel, Union Theological Seminary, Professor Emeritus of Church History
- Edward W. Poitras, Drew University, Professor Emeritus of World Christianity
- W. J. A. Power, University of Toronto, W. J. A. Power Professor Emeritus of Biblical Hebrew and Old Testament Interpretation
- Marjorie Procter-Smith, University of Notre Dame, Le Van Professor Emerita of Preaching and Worship
- Charles M. Wood, Yale University, Lehman Professor Emeritus of Christian Doctrine
- Albert C. Outler, Yale University, Professor of Theology Emeritus

== Present and former Bishops-in-Residence ==
- D. Max Whitfield, director of the Center for Religious Leadership
- William Kenneth Pope
- John Wesley Hardt
- David J. Lawson
- William B. Oden
- William McFerrin Stowe
