= Kathleen Baskin-Ball =

American Methodist minister

Kathleen Baskin-Ball (September 16, 1958 – December 2, 2008) was an American minister. She was an ordained elder in the United Methodist Church. She was ordained as deacon and probationary member of the North Texas Conference in 1983 and as elder and full member of the North Texas Conference in 1988. She received national recognition for her preaching, especially to youth. She was a keynote speaker at Youth2007, the international youth conference of the UMC. She was also recognized regionally as the first female minister in North Texas to demonstrate high membership and worship attendance growth while serving as senior pastor of a large church. She had a notable career record of growth in membership, worship attendance, and people joining by profession of faith. Baskin-Ball died on December 2, 2008, after two years' illness with cancer.

Baskin-Ball preaching at Suncreek United Methodist Church (Allen, Texas) in 2007

== Churches served ==
- Suncreek United Methodist Church, senior pastor, 2001-2008 (Allen, Texas)
- Greenland Hills United Methodist Church, senior pastor, 1994-2001 (East Dallas, Texas)
- Nueva Esperanza United Methodist Church, pastor, 1989-1994 (West Dallas, Texas)
- First United Methodist Church of Denton, associate pastor, 1984-1989 (Denton, Texas)
- First United Methodist Church of Wichita Falls, intern pastor, 1983-1984 (Wichita Falls, Texas)
- Holy Covenant United Methodist Church, associate pastor, Director of Youth Ministries, 1980-1983 (Carrollton, Texas)

== Education ==
Baskin-Ball earned a Bachelor of Arts degree in psychology from North Texas State University in 1981 and a Master of Divinity degree from Perkins School of Theology at Southern Methodist University in 1986.

== Ordained ministry milestones ==
In 1981, Baskin-Ball was the first woman in the North Texas conference of the UMC to enter seminary immediately after completing her undergraduate education.(Between 1965 and 1982, all the women ordained by the North Texas conference were entering ministry as a second career.)

In 2002, Baskin-Ball had a Profession of Faith/Worship Attendance Index value of 17.73. (Worship attendance: 440, Profession of Faith: 78) This index denotes how many persons joined by profession of faith for every 100 persons in worship each week. This is the highest value ever recorded for a female minister serving a large United Methodist church.

In 2003, Baskin-Ball was the first North Texas Conference female minister serving a local church appointment to be elected as a delegate to general conference. (This election was for the 2004 general conference.)

In 2004, Baskin-Ball was the first female minister in North Texas to serve as the senior pastor of a church with average annual attendance of 500 or more. This occurred at Suncreek United Methodist Church in Allen.

Through 2007, Baskin-Ball had a total cumulative average annual worship attendance gain of 548 persons for her three appointments as senior pastor (Nueva Esparanza – 81, Greenland Hills UMC – 168 and Suncreek UMC – 299). This appears to be the highest gain for any female minister in the history of the United Methodist Church and the first to break the 500 person per week gain mark. (Gains in worship attendance are calculated by taking the final or most recent full year that a pastor served a church and subtracting the church's worship attendance for the year prior to their appointment.)

In 2007, Baskin-Ball was the first female minister in the 140-year history of the North Texas Conference of the United Methodist Church to be elected to lead the conference's clergy delegation to the General and Jurisdictional Conferences.

By mid-2008, membership at the three churches Baskin-Ball has served as senior pastor had grown by a total of more than 1500 people during her tenure. Every church at least approximately doubled in size. Membership at Suncreek UMC had tripled at the end of her sixth year of service at the church. She has done this despite being appointed as senior pastor to relatively small churches (0, 301, and 469 members). The membership gain of 1134 people at Suncreek through November 2008 represents the highest gain ever achieved by a female minister at one church in the United Methodist Church. (She was the first female UMC minister to reach the 1000 member growth mark at one church.)

== Preaching ==
Baskin-Ball preached at the Children's Ministries Forum '08, the United Methodist Church's three-day national children's ministries conference.

Baskin-Ball was a keynote speaker at Youth2007, the "Youth Gathering of The United Methodist Church", a four-day international youth conference.

In 2005, Baskin-Ball preached at SpiLiRa, a Spiritual Life Rally for youth that was sponsored by the South Central Jurisdiction of the UMC (8 state region).

Baskin-Ball preached at several large conference youth events, including events in the Texas and Central Texas conferences. She was the featured preacher at the 21st Annual Youth Rally in the Peninsula-Delaware Conference in early 2008 that included about 5,000 youth and adults.

Baskin-Ball has preached at a number of gatherings for youth workers including Perkins School of Youth Ministry.

Baskin-Ball was the preacher/speaker for the 2008 Hopkins Lectures at First UMC Denton, Texas. She was a Rejebian Lecturer at Highland Park UMC (Dallas, Texas).

In 2007, Baskin-Ball received the Award of Excellence in Word and Worship. It was presented by Lovers Lane United Methodist Church.

(See links to video of sermons in External Links listing below.)

== Honors ==
Baskin-Ball was elected as Chair of the Ministry and Higher Education Legislation Committee for the 2008 General Conference of the United Methodist Church.

Baskin-Ball was named Best Pastor in Collin County in the 2006 Reader's Choice Awards sponsored by Star Community Newspapers.

== Other activities ==
In mid-1989, Baskin-Ball was appointed to start a new Hispanic church in West Dallas. The location was a very impoverished neighborhood that the Dallas Morning News called one of the poorest in the nation with "adjusted per capita income" less than "poverty-stricken Mexico". She knew little Spanish so she took an intensive 5-week Spanish course in Cuernavaca, Mexico. She lived in the community and went door to door to start the church. A vibrant multi-ethnic congregation was formed with predominately Hispanic and African American members. Baskin-Ball preached on Sundays in both English and Spanish. They grew to a membership of 130 and were constituted as a United Methodist church in April 1994. In 2008, she was awarded the Hattie Rankin Moore Leadership Award by Wesley-Rankin Community Center to recognize work and leadership within the community of West Dallas.

Baskin-Ball is one of the four founders of Perkins School of Youth Ministry (est. 1998), a national training event for youth ministers.

Baskin-Ball worked with the organization Proyecto Abrigo in Juarez, Mexico, from its beginning and introduced many churches to the mission. After her death, a small neighborhood in the outskirts of Juarez was named "La Colonia Kathleen Baskin-Ball" by Proyecto Abrigo. A plaque can be found in the neighborhood with this dedication.

== See also ==
- Ordination of women
- Stained-glass ceiling
