= Lon Morris College =

Private junior college in Jacksonville, Texas, US

Coordinates: 31.95501°N 95.27703°W

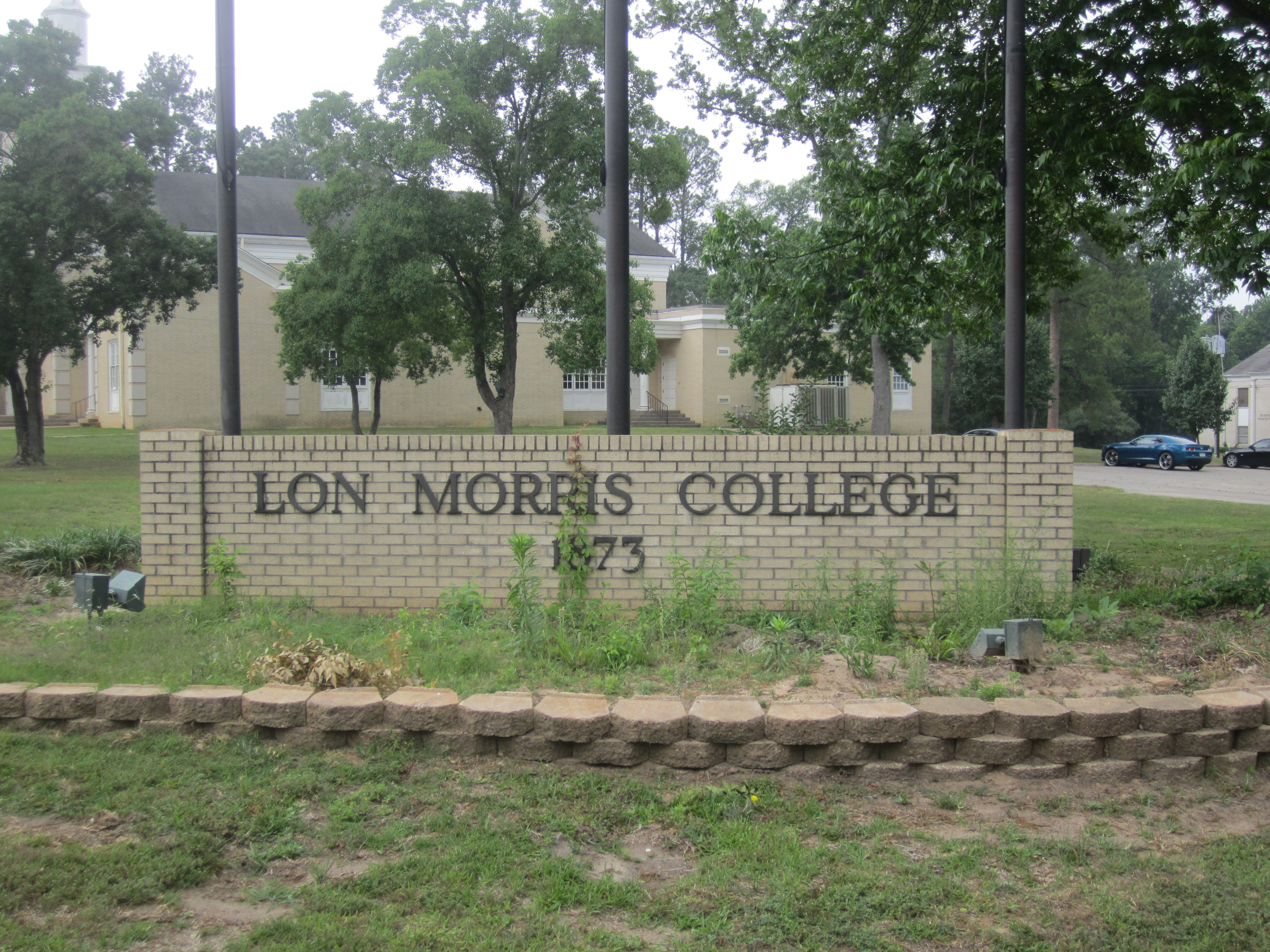
- Type: Junior college
- Active: 1854–2012
- Affiliations: United Methodist Church
- President: Vacant
- Students: 1,000
- Location: Jacksonville, Texas, USA
- Campus: Urban
- Colors: Green and White
- Mascot: Bearcat
- Website: www.lonmorris.edu

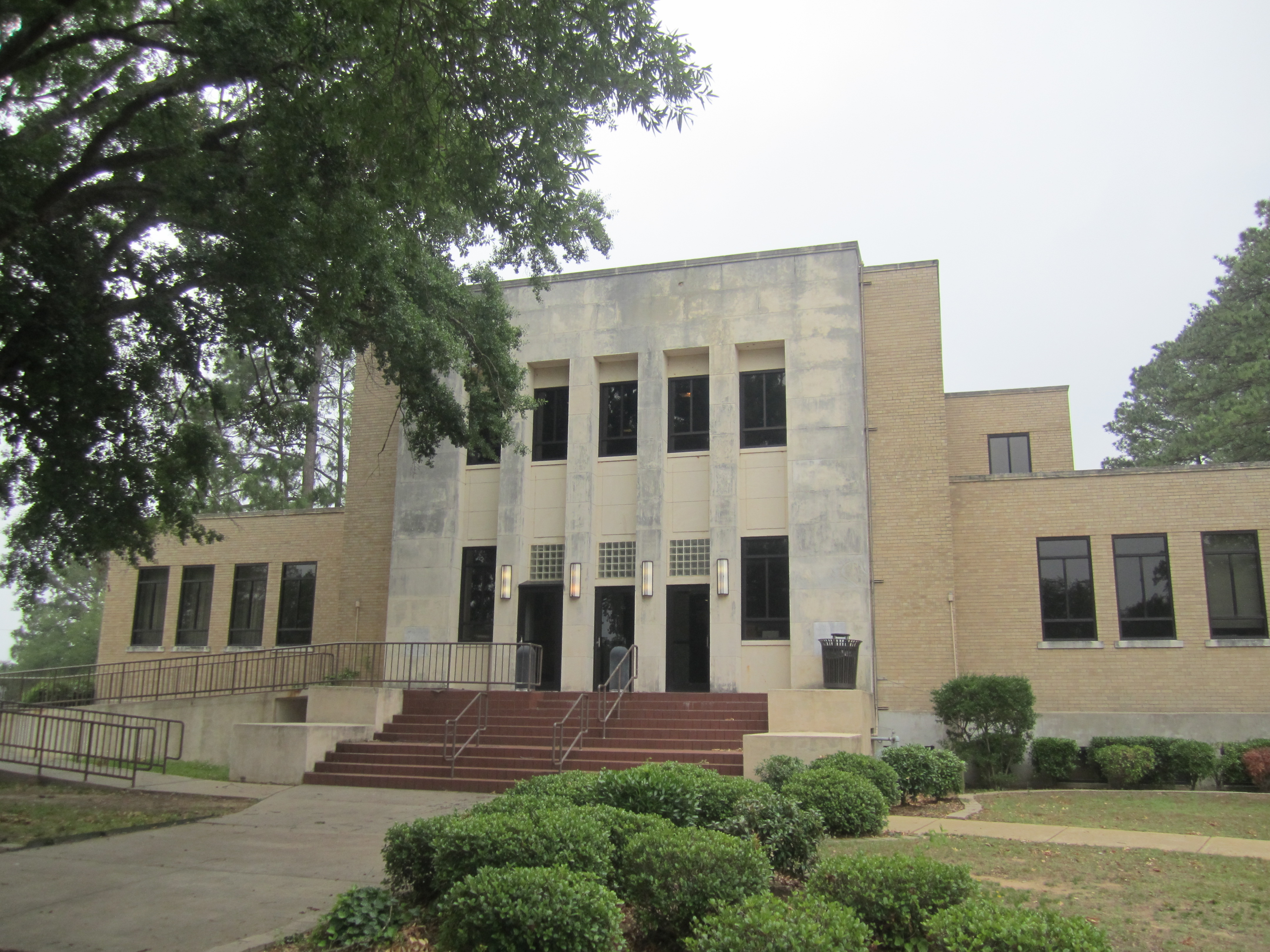
A. Frank Smith Fine Arts Building hosted theatre, music, and dance.

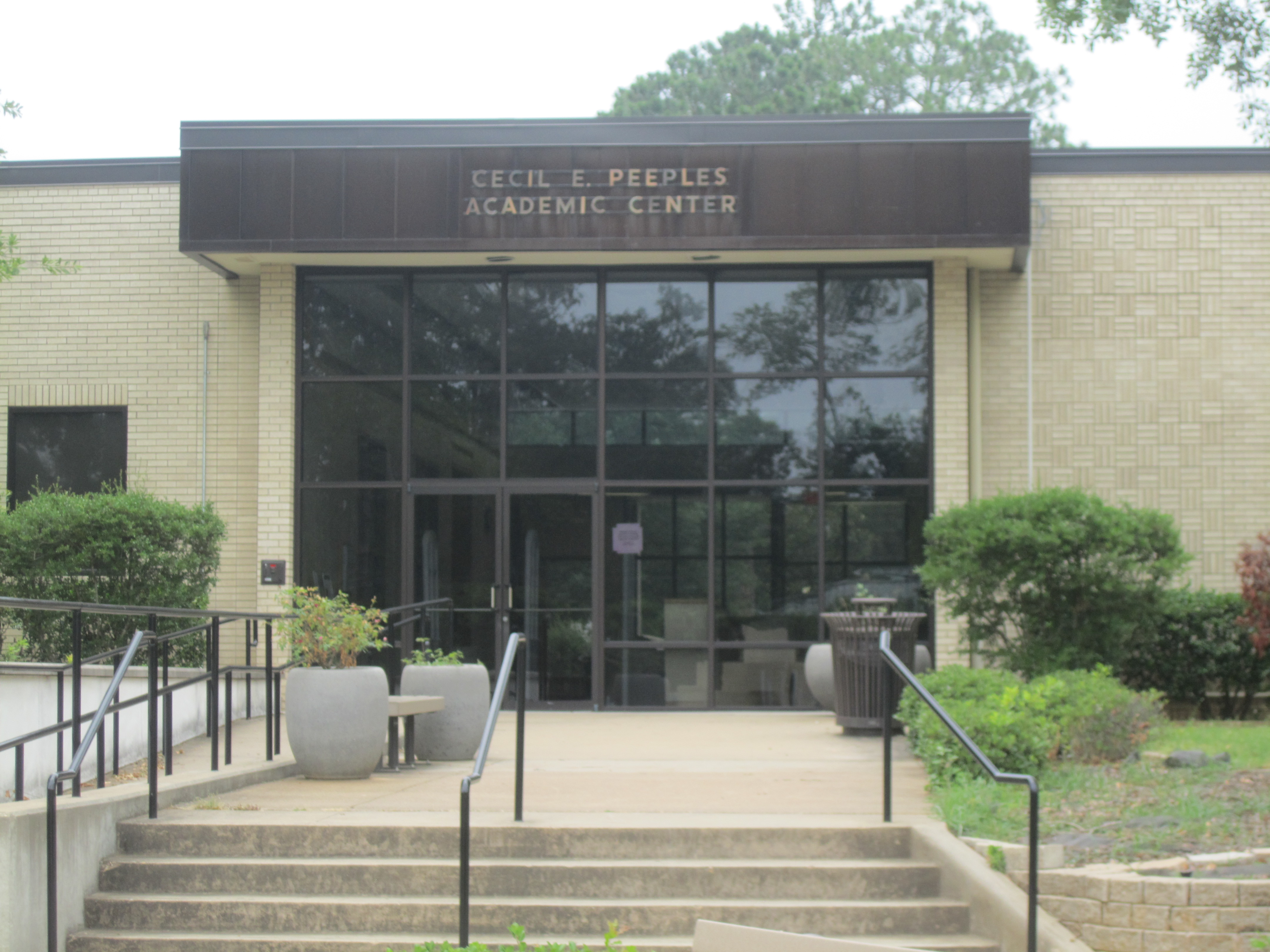
Cecil E. Peeples Academic Center

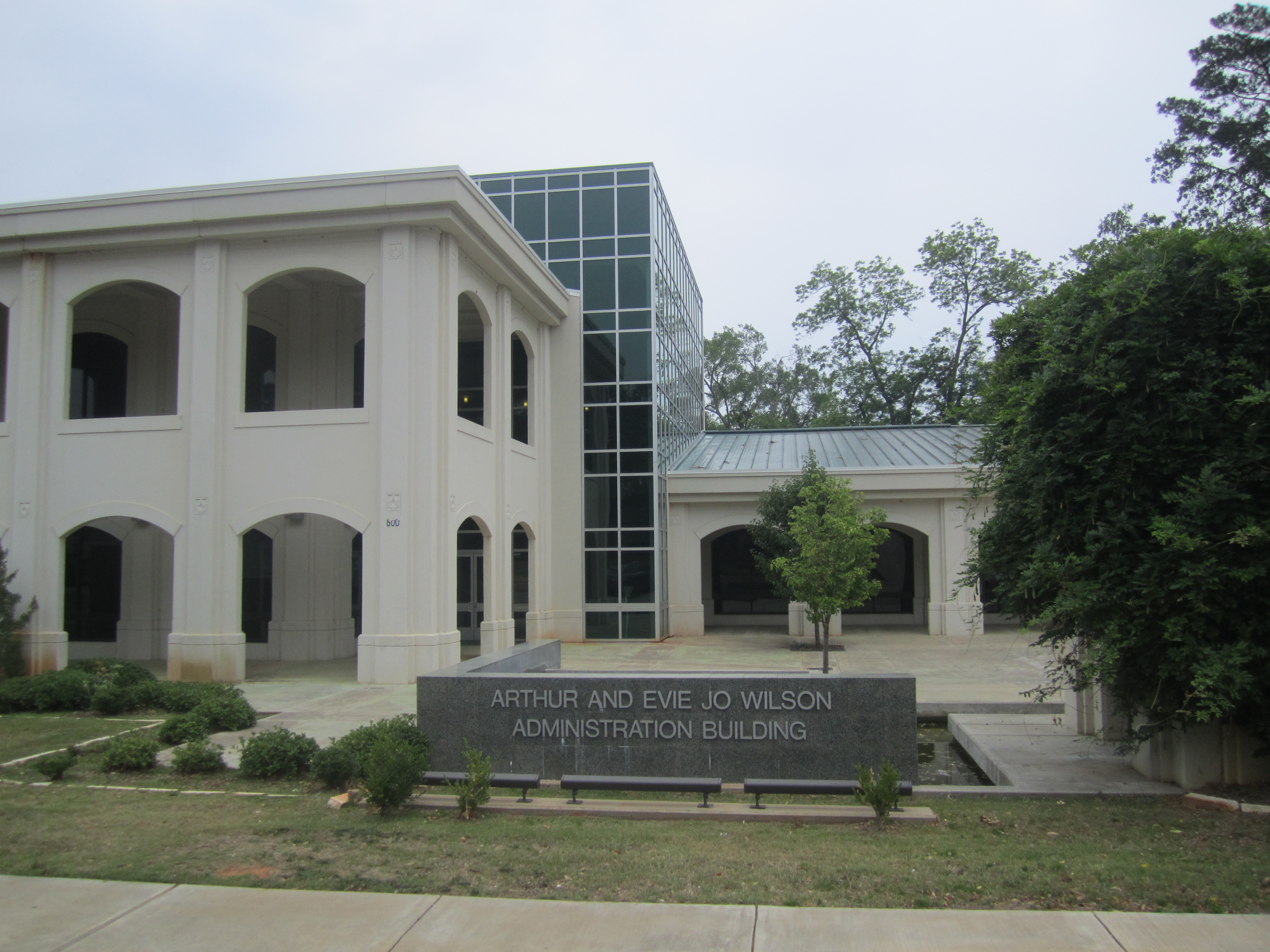
Arthur and Evie Jo Wilson Administration Building

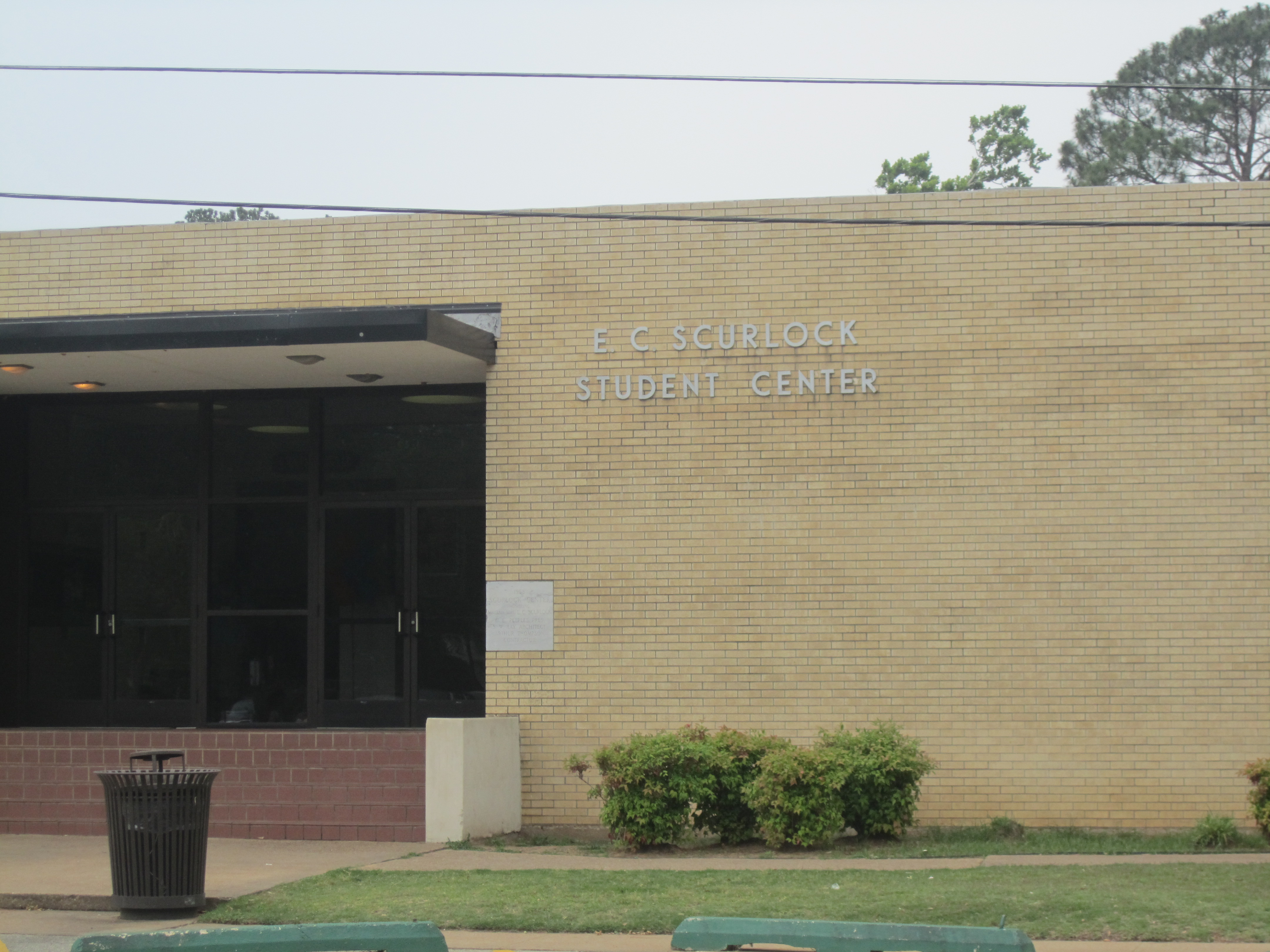
E. C. Scurlock Student Center

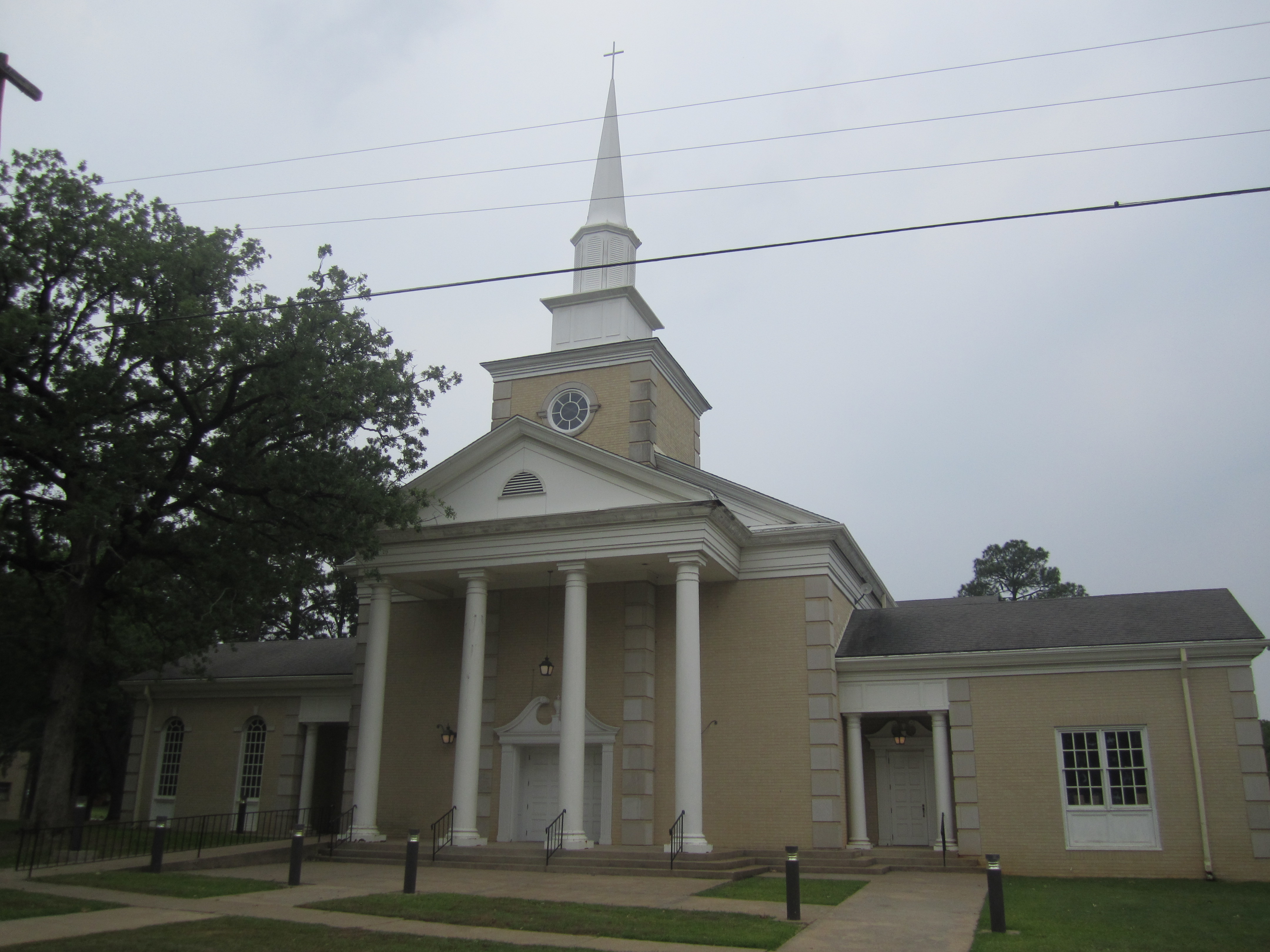
Chapel at Lon Morris College

Lon Morris College (LMC) was a private junior college located in Jacksonville, Texas, United States, and was the only school affiliated with the United Methodist Church that was owned by an individual conference and not the denomination as a whole. Lon Morris was an accredited two-year institute of higher learning, which provided instruction in the arts and sciences with a core curriculum emphasizing liberal arts. While Lon Morris taught as many as 350 students in a semester, enrollment reached more than 1,000, a new record, in the fall of 2009. The school was 30 miles (48 km) south of Tyler. The person who last held the title of college president was Dr. Miles McCall; he resigned effective May 24, 2012.

Lon Morris College filed for bankruptcy on July 2, 2012. The 112-acre (45 ha) campus was auctioned on January 14, 2013, in Dallas, Texas; the primary purchasers were a local school district and an office supply company.

== History ==
Founded in 1854 as the New Danville Masonic Female Academy near Kilgore, Texas, Lon Morris College was the oldest existing two-year college in Texas until its closure in 2012. In 1873, the academy moved to Kilgore and became property of the Kilgore Methodist Church, changing its name to the Alexander Institute in honor of its president Isaac Alexander, an early Texas educator.

The Texas Annual Conference acquired the Alexander Institute in 1875. Chartered on January 15, 1887, the Institute moved to Jacksonville in 1894 and to its final location in 1909. After R.A. "Lon" Morris of Pittsburg, Texas, gave his estate to the school, and with approval of the Texas Annual Conference, the name of the institution was changed again, in 1924, to Lon Morris College.

When it closed, Lon Morris was the only two-year Methodist college west of the Mississippi River, and it had held membership in the Southern Association of Colleges and Schools longer than any other two-year college in Texas. It was the only surviving pre-Civil War school in East Texas.

One of Lon Morris' presidents was John E. Fellers, a Christian writer and Methodist minister, primarily in the Houston area, but also in Alexandria and Shreveport, Louisiana.

In 2009, the campus of Lon Morris grew to the west, with a gift from the city of Jacksonville of a municipal activity center (formerly a Texas National Guard armory), a rodeo arena, and land surrounding both. The college allowed annual events for the Tops-in-Texas Rodeo at the rodeo arena without any financial outlays from the city.

Students participated in a variety of sports including men's and women's basketball, baseball and softball, men's and women's soccer, men's and women's golf, volleyball, cheer leading and dance. In 2009, football was added as a varsity sport in an attempt to increase revenue, but this effort was unsuccessful and all athletics programs were disbanded in 2012.

In February 2010, Lon Morris announced a new agriculture curriculum, begun in the fall of 2010. In March 2010, the college acquired a downtown Jacksonville building that originally had housed the city post office for many decades. A local family had owned and operated the building for a time as a hotel and restaurant under the name The Landmark. Lon Morris announced it would use the acquired property for its new hospitality administration program, for which classes would start in the fall of 2010.

By March 2010, a new dormitory, Cooper House, opened on the campus, with room for thirty-two students. Another new dormitory was called The Lodge.

On May 23, 2012, all college employees, with the exception of 11 core employees, were furloughed indefinitely. Over 100 individuals were furloughed. The furlough occurred after the school missed three pay periods. Miles McCall, the president, submitted his resignation notice via e-mail. McCall's resignation was effective May 24, 2012. The affected individuals were notified via email. The decision to furlough was made by the Bridge Point Consulting Company. On May 5, 2012, the board of trustees had asked Bridge Point Consulting Company to make recommendations on how to proceed with a planned restructuring of the school. Later that month Tyler Junior College sent an outreach team to help Lon Morris students register for summer classes at Tyler Junior College. It also allowed LMC students to live at the junior college residence halls at discounted rates.

== Campus ==
Residence halls included Brown Hall, Clark Hall, Craven-Wilson Hall, and Fair Hall. Other student housing facilities included Cooper House, LMC Cottages, and LMC Lodge.

== Notable alumni ==
Alumni of the Lon Morris College Theatre Arts Department include:

- Sandy Duncan, stage, TV, and movie actress, singer, and dancer
- Margo Martindale, film and TV actress
- K. T. Oslin, country music singer
- Tommy Tune, stage actor, dancer, performer, choreographer, director, and producer
- Christopher Ayres, anime voice-actor
- Amanda McBroom, Golden Globe-winning songwriter ("The Rose")
- Edwin Neal, actor
- Alan Tudyk, stage, film, and television actor
- William Johnson [aka Bill Johnson (XI) on IMDB], stage, film, television, author, performance coach.

Other Lon Morris alumni include:

- Dexter Cambridge, Bahamian professional basketball player
- John Wesley Hardt, bishop in the United Methodist Church
- Micah Hoffpauir, Chicago Cubs first baseman
- Johnny Horton, country music singer
- Neal McCoy, country music artist
- Dee Ann McWilliams, Major General, US Army
- Cindy Pickett, actress
- Carl Reynolds, major league baseball player and member of the Texas Sports Hall of Fame
- Chris Sampson, major league baseball player
- Shaquille Murray-Lawrence, Professional football player, Team Canada Bobsled
- Daniel Antunez, Professional soccer player

== Bibliography ==
- Lon Morris College, a storied academic history, Jacksonville Daily Progress, August 16, 2009. Retrieved 2009-10-24.
- John Wesley Hardt, "Cecil Peeples: a twentieth century giant: the story of Cecil Peeples, and his years at Lon Morris College in Jacksonville, Texas", UMR Communications, 1999. Retrieved 2009-10-24.
- Glendell A. Jones, "Mid the pine hills of East Texas: the Methodist centennial history of Lon Morris College", Progress Publishing Co., 1973. Retrieved 2009-10-24.
