= Henry Blackaby =

Canadian evangelical pastor (1935–2024)

Henry Thomas Blackaby (15 April 1935 – 10 February 2024) was a Canadian evangelical pastor who was the founder of Blackaby Ministries International. Most known for his best selling study called Experiencing God, he also authored many other books and articles. His books have been translated into more than 40 languages.

== Background ==
Henry T. Blackaby was born in British Columbia on 15 April 1935. He studied English and History at the University of British Columbia as an undergraduate and earned his B.D. and Th.M. from Golden Gate Baptist Theological Seminary. He also held five honorary doctorate degrees. On June 3, 1960, Blackaby married Marilynn Sue Wells, whom he had met at seminary.

=== Ministry ===
In 1970, Blackaby began pastoring at a tiny church called Faith Baptist Church in Saskatoon, Saskatchewan. Blackaby went on to serve on the staff at the North American Mission Board of the Southern Baptist Convention and also served as special assistant to the presidents of the International Mission Board and LifeWay Christian Resources. He held other roles such as a music director, an education director, a pastor in California and Canada, and as president of Canadian Baptist Theological College for thirteen years. He published many books, including Experiencing God: Knowing and Doing the Will of God in 1990, which has sold more than eight million copies. Blackaby also won the Evangelical Christian Publishers Association's Gold Medallion Award for the devotionals Experiencing God Together and Experiencing God Day by Day.

Blackaby died on 10 February 2024, at the age of 88.

== Education ==
- University of British Columbia – English & History
- Golden Gate Baptist Theological Seminary – Bachelor of Divinity & Master of Theology
- Five Honorary Doctorates were also awarded

== Selected Bibliography ==
- Blackaby, Henry; Blackaby, Richard; King, Claude V. (2021). Experiencing God: Knowing and Doing the Will of God. B&H Publishing Group. ISBN 9781087753737.
- Blackaby, Henry; Blackaby, Richard (2006). Spiritual Leadership: Moving People on to God's Agenda. B&H Publishing Group. ISBN 9780805454741.
- ———; ——— (2002). Hearing God's Voice. Broadman & Holman. ISBN 9780805424935.
- ———; Blackaby, Thomas (1999). The Man God Uses. Broadman & Holman. ISBN 9780805421453.
- ———; Blackaby, Richard (2004). Called to be God's Leader: Lessons from the life of Joshua. Thomas Nelson. ISBN 9780785262039.
- ——— (2003). Holiness: God's Plan for Fullness of Life. Thomas Nelson. ISBN 9781418529567.
- ——— (2005). Created to Be God's Friend: How God Shapes Those He Loves. Thomas Nelson. ISBN 9780785275329.
- ———; Blackaby, Mel (2004). What's So Spiritual about Your Gifts?. Multnomah Books. ISBN 9781590523445.
- ———; King, Claude; Blackaby, Richard. Fresh Encounter: God's Plan for Your Spiritual Awakening. B&H Publishing Group. ISBN 9780805449952.
- ———; Skinner, Kerry L. (2002). Called & Accountable: God's Purpose for Every Believer. New Hope Publishers. ISBN 9781563097232.
- ———; Willis, Avery T. (2002). On Mission with God: Living God's Purpose for His Glory. Broadman & Holman Publishers. ISBN 9780805425536.
- ———; Edgemon, Ray T. The Ways of God: How God Reveals Himself Before a Watching World. B&H Publishing Group. ISBN 9780805423730.
- ——— (2005). Chosen to be God's Prophet: Lessons from the Life of Samuel. Thomas Nelson. ISBN 9780785275107.
- ——— (2013). What the Spirit Is Saying to the Churches. Multnomah Books. ISBN 9780307564573.
- ———; Blackaby, Melvin D. A God Centered Church: Experiencing God Together. B&H Publishing Group. ISBN 9780805445510.
- ———; Blackaby, Richard (2007). Discovering God's Daily Agenda. Thomas Nelson. ISBN 9780529124241.
- ———; Blackaby, Tom (2009). Anointed to Be God's Servants: How God Blesses Those Who Serve Together. Thomas Nelson. ISBN 9781418513290.
- ——— (1995). When God Speaks: How to Recognize God's Voice and Respond in Obedience. LifeWay Press. ISBN 9780805498226.
