= Gateway Seminary =

American Baptist theological school

- Former name: Golden Gate Baptist Theological Seminary
- Established: 1944; 82 years ago
- Affiliation: Southern Baptist Convention
- Endowment: $49.6 million (2020)
- President: Adam Groza
- Location: Ontario, California
- Website: www.gs.edu

Gateway Seminary (GS), formerly known as Golden Gate Baptist Theological Seminary, is a Baptist theological institute based in Ontario, California with campuses in Fremont, California; Phoenix, Arizona; Vancouver, Washington; and Centennial, Colorado. It is affiliated with the Southern Baptist Convention.

The seminary is accredited by the Association of Theological Schools in the United States and Canada and the Western Association of Schools and Colleges. Adam Groza has been the seminary president since April 15, 2024.

== History ==
The seminary was founded in 1944 as Golden Gate Baptist Theological Seminary by the Golden Gate Baptist Church and the First Southern Baptist Church of San Francisco in the Golden Gate Baptist Church of Oakland, California. In 2016, the Mill Valley, California campus moved to Ontario, California and the school was renamed Gateway Seminary.

=== Presidents ===
No.	Name	Term
1	Isam B. Hodges	1944–1946
2	Benjamin O. Herring	1946–1952
3	Harold K. Graves	1952–1977
4	William M. Pinson Jr.	1977–1982
5	Franklin D. Pollard	1983–1986
6	William O. Crews Jr.	1986–2004
7	Jeff Iorg	2004–2024
8	Adam Groza	2024–present

== Notable alumni ==
- Henry Blackaby – Minister and author of the popular Bible study "Experiencing God".
- John Christy – Distinguished Professor of Atmospheric Science and Director of the Earth System Science Center at The University of Alabama in Huntsville.
- J. Warner Wallace – homicide detective and Christian apologist
- Julie Pennington-Russell – Pastor
