= Stained-glass ceiling =

Sociological phenomenon in religious communities

The stained-glass ceiling is a sociological phenomenon in religious communities similar to the concept of the "glass ceiling". This concept revolves around the apparent difficulty for women who seek to gain a role within church leadership. The use of the term "stained-glass ceiling" is metaphorical, indicating the level of power or authority within religious groups that tends to demarcate the limit of women's rise within church hierarchies. This could range from a group's de jure barring of women from positions like priest, bishop, pastor, rabbi, or similar clerical figures, to gender discrimination at the level of local congregations that prevent women from rising to any role of particular status or power.

The stained-glass ceiling is a particular aspect of a broader trend of gender segregation and discrimination in religious communities.

The phrase "stained-glass" refers to the frequent placement of stained-glass artwork in places of Christian worship.

== Statistics ==
Among the most significant examples of resistance to female clergy has been in the position of senior pastor in large church settings. For example, in the United Methodist Church only two women have ever led churches with membership numbers within the top 100 of United Methodist churches in the U.S. As of 2005, there were no female ministers currently leading top 100 membership United Methodist local congregations. Resistance has eased more rapidly for the position of bishop in the United Methodist Church. For 2004–2008, 15 of the 50 (30%) United Methodist bishops serving the U.S. are women.

== Notable people ==
- Marjorie Matthews, elected bishop in the United Methodist Church in 1980. She was the first woman elected as a bishop by a U.S. mainline Christian denomination.
- Julie Pennington-Russell, Senior Pastor of First Baptist Church (Decatur, Georgia: 2007–present). The largest church affiliated with the Southern Baptist Convention with a woman as senior pastor (weekly worship attendance of 483/ 2,696 members "1,804 resident and 892 non-resident").
- Barbara Harris – the first woman ordained as a bishop in the Anglican Communion (1989)
- Katharine Jefferts Schori – the first woman elected as a primate of the worldwide Anglican Communion (2006)
- Elizabeth Eaton – the first woman elected as presiding bishop in the Evangelical Lutheran Church in America (2013)

== See also ==
- Ordination of women
- Glass cliff
