= David J. Lawson =

American Methodist bishop (1930–2007)

David Jerald Lawson (March 26, 1930 – May 31, 2007) was an American who gained notability as a pastor and university campus minister in the Methodist and United Methodist churches, as a district superintendent, annual conference official, and as a bishop of the United Methodist Church (UMC), elected in 1984. He also played a key role establishing and developing Africa University, which is the only UMC university on the continent.

== Birth and family ==
David was born in Princeton, Indiana and married Martha Ellen Pegram, also of Princeton. The Lawsons had two children: a son, John Mark, married to Louann (who have one son, Matthew); and a daughter, Karen Sue, married to Ray Eynon (who have two children, Rachel and Jacob). David also had a brother, John; married to Lilia; with son Vlad.

== Education ==
Lawson earned degrees from the University of Evansville (A.B., 1955) and Garrett Biblical Institute (B.D., 1959). Additional studies included graduate work in psychology and counseling at Garrett and special studies in organizational development. Areas of independent studies included the Theology of Ordination, and the Ministry of Jesus in Galilee. He served as a trainer in leadership development, an instructor at the University of Evansville, a keynote speaker at several conferences on science and Christianity, and leader of laity and clergy retreats. He and his wife also served as certified trainers for Marriage Enrichment. He was a member of Pi Gamma Mu Social Science Honorary Fraternity.

== Ordained ministry ==
David was admitted to Probationary Membership in the Indiana Annual Conference and was ordained a Deacon in The Methodist Church in 1956. He became a Member in Full Connection and was ordained an Elder in 1959. Both ordinations were officiated by Bishop Richard C. Raines.

David's pastoral ministry included the Epworth Church (student pastor) in the Indiana Conference and the Wolcott Church (also student) in the Northwest Indiana Conference. Following seminary graduation, he was appointed to Carrollton and Tell City, then to the Wesley Foundation at Indiana University, then the Beech Grove Church in Indianapolis. He was the Superintendent of the Evansville District and the Director of the South Indiana Conference Council on Ministries. He then was the Pastor of the Carmel Church (Indianapolis) when elected to the Episcopacy.

Prior to his election, David served as a delegate to the U.M. North Central Jurisdictional Conference (1972–84) and General Conference (1976–84). In South Indiana, he served as Registrar and Chairperson of the Conference Board of Ordained Ministry and as Chairperson of the Conference Camping Commission.

== Episcopal ministry ==
Elected to the episcopacy by the North Central Jurisdictional Conference of the U.M.C. in 1984, Bishop Lawson was assigned the Wisconsin episcopal area (1984–92) and the Springfield Area (1992–96). As a Bishop he served as Vice President of the U.M. General Board of Higher Education and Ministry (President of Division on Chaplains and Related Ministry), and as vice president and President of the General Board of Discipleship (Chairperson of Long Range Planning Committee). He served as a member of the Steering Committee for Africa University (Chairperson of its Curriculum and Design Committee, and Chairperson of the Selection Committee for the first Dean of its School of Theology).

Bishop Lawson also served as President of the Wisconsin Conference of Churches. He was the President of the U.M. North Central College of Bishops, and on various committees of the Council of Bishops (including chairing the committee to Study the Ministry). He was also a member of the executive committee of the World Methodist Council and President of its Committee on International Theological Education. Bishop Lawson also held many other responsibilities throughout the Church.

He served as a Trustee of many colleges and universities, including University of Evansville, North Central College, Illinois Wesleyan University, McKendree University, and MacMurray College. He also served as a Trustee of hospitals, including Methodist Hospital of Indiana, Meriter Hospital in Madison, Wisconsin, Methodist Medical Center of Peoria, Illinois, and several retirement homes in Wisconsin and Illinois.

Following retirement in 1996, Bishop Lawson served as Bishop-in-Residence and a faculty member of the Perkins School of Theology, Southern Methodist University.

== Founding of Africa University ==
Lawson served on the Site Selection Committee for A.U., helping to select the site at Old Mutare, Zimbabwe. In consultation with Dean (now Bishop) David K. Yemba, he wrote the Mission Statement for the university's Faculty (School) of Theology. "He probably lived and breathed Africa University for a while," said James Salley, the university's Associate Vice chancellor for Institutional Advancement, upon Bishop Lawson's death. "He will be greatly missed by all of us. He was a good friend of Africa University."

== Death and funeral ==
Bishop David Jerald Lawson died 31 May 2007 at his home in Franklin, Indiana following a lengthy illness. He was 77 years old. A Memorial Service celebrating Bishop Lawson's life was held Monday, 11 June 2007 at 1:30 p.m. E.D.T. in the sanctuary of the Saint Luke U.M.C., 100 W. 86th St., Indianapolis, IN. Visitation with the family preceded the service. A private service with interment of ashes followed the Memorial Service. Bishop Lawson was survived by his wife, children and grandchildren.

== Remembrances ==
Retired U.M. Bishop J. Woodrow Hearn called David Lawson "an extremely inisightful leader," dedicated to the mission of the Church. "He had always carried out his responsibilities with a warm heart, a loving interest in people and was dedicated to helping the world move toward the goal of being a part of the kingdom of God."

Bishop Michael J. Coyner called Lawson his "consecration bishop" as he recalled how Bishop Lawson preached at the 1996 Episcopal Consecration Service at the North Central Jurisdictional Conference, at which Coyner was consecrated a bishop. "Since that time, David has been a colleague, friend, advisor and supporter," Coyner told members of the 2007 North Indiana Annual Conference as he announced Lawson's death. "He once told me, 'I am one of your balcony people – encouraging you in your ministry as a Bishop.' I have felt and experienced his support, especially since I returned to Indiana three years ago. I will miss having him around to provide that kind of encouragement and advice." Bishop Coyner was at the time assigned the Indiana Episcopal Area.

The Rev. Lloyd M. Wright, a seminary classmate and lifelong ministerial colleague, said Lawson "shared a rich life of talent and love, a legacy long to be remembered." Mr. Wright said further, "David was a man of deep drives of passion for ministry. He could hold you spellbound as he described his spiritual development at the time of his ordination as Deacon and at his ordination of Elder. David spent much of his leadership time with boards of ordained ministry. He shared a real passion for making every step into the ordained ministry a step of faith and growth."

== See also ==
- List of bishops of the United Methodist Church
