= Dee Ann McWilliams =

United States Army general

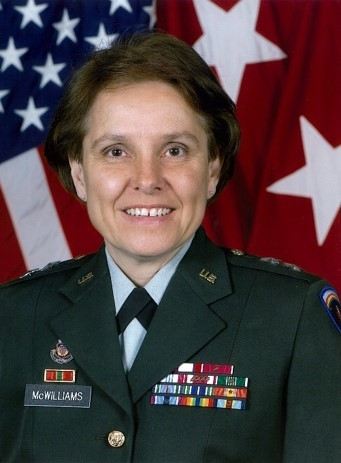
- Born: Shreveport, Louisiana
- Military career
- Allegiance: United States
- Branch: United States Army
- Service years: 1974–2003
- Rank: Major General
- Commands: 3rd Personnel Group; 42d Adjutant General Battalion
- Awards: Army Distinguished Service Medal; Legion of Merit

Dee Ann McWilliams is a retired United States Army major general. McWilliams is past President of the Women in Service for America Memorial Foundation. She took her commission in 1974 in the Women's Army Corps and was assigned to the Adjutant General Corps. In over 29 years with the army, she held a variety of Human Relations positions, commanding four companies, a training battalion, and a personnel brigade. She also taught national strategic studies and leadership, and served as an Equal Opportunity Officer.

== Early life ==
McWilliams was born in Shreveport, Louisiana to Lorenzo Dow McWilliams Jr. and Rachel Ramsey McWilliams. She attended public schools in Timpson, Texas. She was the middle child of three children.

== Military career ==
McWilliams commanded four companies in her early military years, HQ Company, Military Community, Augsburg, Germany; Personnel Assistance Point, JFK Airport, New York; I Corps Personnel Service Company and 9th Infantry Division Personnel Service Company, Fort Lewis, WA; 42d Adjutant General Battalion, Fort Dix, NJ; and 3d Personnel Group, Fort Hood, TX. She served on staff as Chief, Department of Army Secretariat for Selection Boards; at the National War College; as Director, Enlisted Personnel Management, Army Personnel Command; and as Director, Military Personnel Management, HQ Department of the Army; Washington, DC.

McWilliams was promoted below the zone to lieutenant colonel and below the zone to colonel. As commander of the 42d Adjutant General Battalion, McWilliams worked to mobilize 5,700 Reserve soldiers to the Southwest Asia Sustainment Force while simultaneously demobilizing 8,000 Reservists from the first Gulf War and performing normal reception duties for new soldiers. She has served as III Corps AG and commander of the 3rd Personnel Group at Fort Hood, Texas, and director of enlisted personnel management at the Army HRC.

As Director of Military Personnel Management for the Department of the Army, McWilliams developed policy and strategy for staffing, salary compensation, and training for over one million soldiers, to include recruitment of more than one hundred thousand annually. She also served as Deputy Chief of Staff for Personnel and Installation Management in Europe, where she provided human resource and quality of life support to soldiers in Germany, Italy, Hungary, Kosovo, Croatia, Bosnia, Greece, and Egypt. In 2003, McWilliams was nominated to become the Assistant Secretary for Public and Intergovernmental Affairs at the Department of Veterans Affairs. This nomination was later withdrawn at her request.

Her military awards include the Army Distinguished Service Medal, Legion of Merit, Defense Meritorious Service Medal, Meritorious Service Medal, Army Commendation Medal, Joint Service Achievement Medal, and Army Achievement Medal.

== Education ==
McWilliams holds degrees from Lon Morris College, Texas Womans University, the National War College, and Stephen F. Austin University, where she was named a distinguished alumnus in 1998.

== Later career and recognition ==
After retiring in 2003, she established the Lessons Learned Center for the director of national intelligence and served as center director.

In 2007, McWilliams joined the board of directors for the Women In Military Service For America Memorial Foundation, assuming the position of Vice Chair in 2014. She formerly served as President of the Army Women's Foundation, a Director on the Army Historical Foundation Board, and on the Lon Morris College Board of Trustees.

2013 – recipient of the American Veterans Center Lillian K. Keil Award for outstanding contribution to women's service in the United States military and was named a Trailblazer by Women Veterans Interactive.

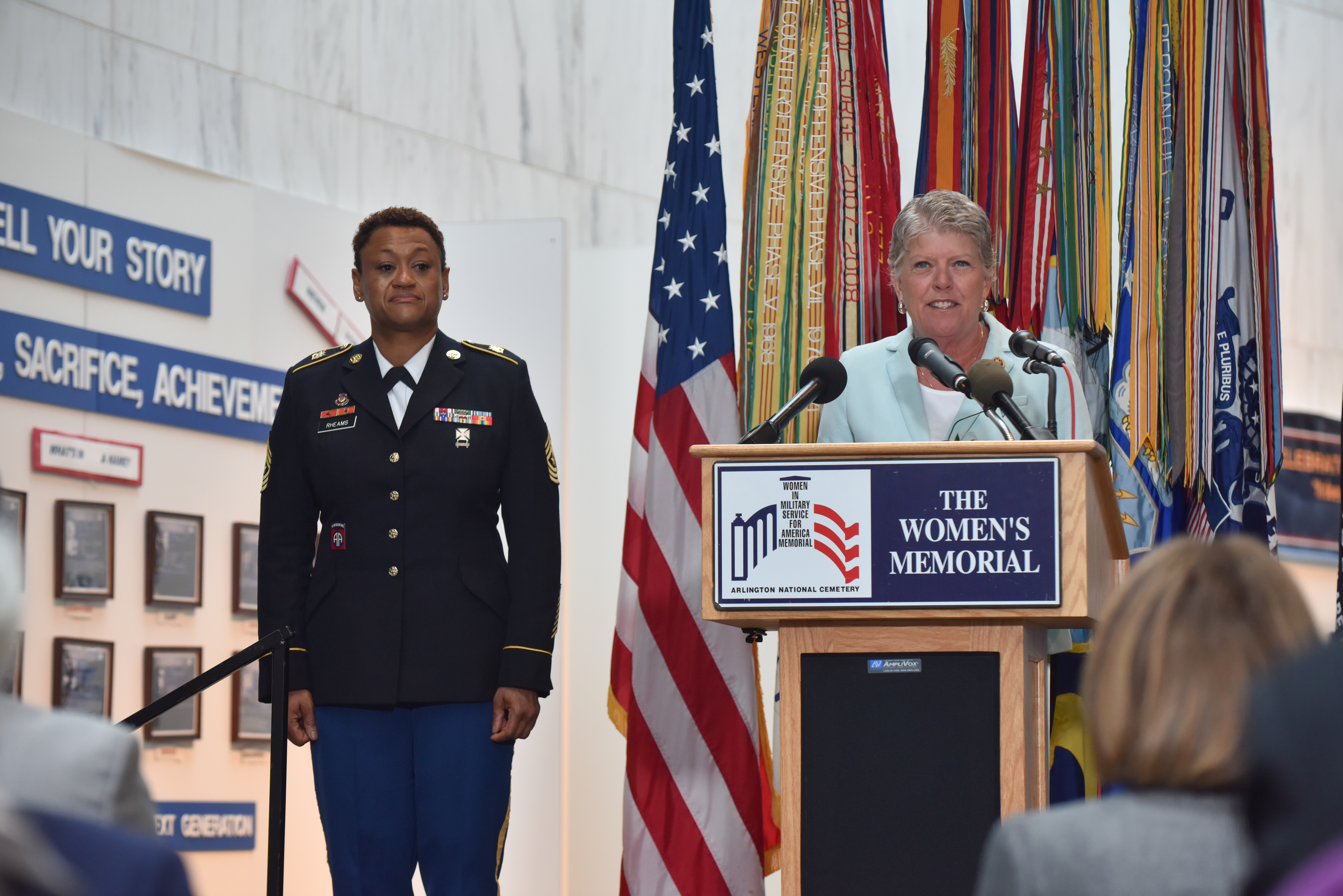
McWilliams (right) at an event for the Women In Military Service For America Memorial Foundation in 2018

2015 – McWilliams was inducted into the Adjutant General Corps' Hall of Fame.

2020 – McWilliams was inducted into the U.S. Army Women's Foundation Hall of Fame.
