= John Wesley Hardt =

American bishop (1921–2017)

John Wesley Hardt (14 July 1921 – 18 June 2017) was an American bishop of the United Methodist Church, elected in 1980. He also distinguished himself as a preacher and a pastor of Methodist Churches, as a district superintendent, and as an author and biographer.

== Birth and family ==
Hardt was born in San Antonio, Texas, a son of the Rev. and Mrs. W.W. Hardt. On 13 September 1943 he married Martha Carson of Malakoff, Henderson County, Texas. They had four children: Betty (Mrs. Ed Lesko), William C., John S. and James J. (known as Joe). The Hardts also had eight grandchildren.

== Education ==
Hardt attended Lon Morris College in Jacksonville, Texas, and then earned the B.A. degree from Southern Methodist University in 1942. He earned the Bachelor of Divinity degree from Perkins School of Theology (at S.M.U.) in 1946. He also did graduate work at Vanderbilt University in Nashville and Union Theological Seminary in New York City. He also holds honorary doctorates from Southwestern University and from Oklahoma City University.

== Ordained ministry ==
During college Hardt served as a supply pastor. Bishop A. Frank Smith ordained him a deacon in 1943 and an elder in 1944 in the Texas Annual Conference. In 1943 Hardt relieved his father as pastor at Malakoff. Following the death of his father, Hardt served there another year.

Hardt served four other pastorates in the Texas Conference, each one involving a major building program. In 1977, after serving the First U.M.C., Beaumont, Texas for eighteen years, he was appointed superintendent of the Houston East District until elected to the episcopacy in 1980. Hardt was a delegate to all U.M. General Conferences from 1960 until 1980, during which time he was also active on general and conference agencies.

== Episcopal ministry ==
Upon his election, Bishop Hardt was assigned to the Oklahoma episcopal area. He served Oklahoma until his retirement in 1988. He then became Bishop-in-Residence at Perkins School of Theology, later becoming Bishop-in-Residence Emeritus.

Bishop Hardt served as a Trustee of St. Paul School of Theology, Lon Morris College, Southern Methodist University and Oklahoma City University. He was active in Rotary International and traveled extensively.

== Selected writings ==
- Not the Ashes, but the Fire, 1977 (a book of sermons).
- Lakeview, A Story of Inspiring Unity, 1992.
- Cecil Peeples, Giant of the 20th Century, 1999.
- Forward in Faith, 1999 (a history of Marvin United Church, Tyler, TX).

== See also ==
- List of bishops of the United Methodist Church
