= Costi Hinn =

American evangelical pastor and author

Costi William Hinn (born November 12, 1984) is an American evangelical pastor and author. He is founder and president of For The Gospel, and Teaching Pastor of Shepherd's House Bible Church in Chandler, Arizona, a Reformed church planted in February 2022.

== Background and early life ==
Hinn grew up in the center of the prosperity gospel and Word of Faith movements. As the nephew of the world famous televangelist Benny Hinn, he not only benefitted from the family ministry, he believed wholeheartedly that he was following the true teachings of Jesus Christ. While growing up in Vancouver, British Columbia under the ministry and church of his father, Henry Hinn, Costi continued to grow more emboldened in his beliefs. Henry not only mirrored his brother Benny's ministry, but he often travelled and worked for Benny's healing crusades. Costi and the rest of the family were usually brought along on these trips, solidifying his foundation and loyalty within the family empire. As his teenage years evolved, Costi was touted as a "next in line" pastor within the family and prophesied over by Oral Roberts and other famous televangelists as carrying on the family legacy of faith healing one day. But outside of the Hinn family ministry circles, Costi often found himself defending the family's reputation and ministry at school when others would criticize his uncle or accuse his family of scamming people in the name of Jesus. National news pieces by CBC, Dateline NBC, and Inside Edition, accused Benny Hinn of deceiving people, yet the Hinn family (including Costi) would argue that these news stories were all attempts by "the Devil" to discredit their work for God. The wealth of the Hinn family empire grew exponentially through the 1990s and into the 2000s, and Costi had expensive cars, trips to the Burj Al Arab and other top hotels in the world, and a lifestyle more akin to profession athletes and celebrities than a minister of the gospel. After graduating from high school, he would eventually work for his uncle in 2003-2004 before attending college and playing baseball at Saddleback College in 2004-2007, then Dallas Baptist University in 2007-2009.

== Conversion from prosperity theology ==
After a radical conversion in 2012 while serving at a church plant in Orange County, CA, he became outspoken about the deception and abuses in the Word of Faith movement and the teachings of prosperity gospel proponent. He also pulled no punches when it came to speaking out against his uncle, Benny Hinn. This led to a massive split within the family, and Costi was labeled as "divisive," similarly to those in Scientology who are excommunicated as a "suppressive person." Having been excommunicated from the family empire, Costi continued to serve in ministry at Mission Bible Church where he was originally hired, and began seminary training. After initially attending Talbot School of Theology, he went on to complete his theological degree through Midwestern Baptist Theological Seminary before subsequently beginning a doctorate at The Master's Seminary. In 2017, he wrote about his rejection of the prosperity gospel in a Christianity Today article saying, "I wept bitterly over my participation in greedy ministry manipulation and my life of false teaching and beliefs. He also appeared on CNN, publicly identifying his uncle and similar ministries as deceptive and dangerous. In 2018, he co-wrote Defining Deception with Mission Bible Church's Teaching Pastor Tony G. Wood. He has continued writing with a focus on helping Christians understand truth and defend against dangerous errors. Costi followed Defining Deception in 2019 with, God, Greed, and the (Prosperity) Gospel, about his upbringing in the Hinn family. In 2021 he wrote, More Than a Healer to promote biblical teaching on healing. He followed this up in 2023 with Knowing the Spirit, about the person and work of the Holy Spirit. In 2024 he released, Walking in God's Will, a book helping everyday Christian demystify God's plan for their life and make decisions with confidence.

== Church planting & pastoral ministry ==
In 2018, Redeemer Bible Church called Costi Hinn to serve in Arizona because it was experiencing rapid growth under the leadership of its pastor, Jon Benzinger. RBC was a revitalization church and had grown from under 100 people to over 500 in weekly attendance. Costi was brought to Arizona to help Redeemer build ministry infrastructure and launch new ministries, after which time the elders had hoped to send him to plant a church in the growing East Valley of Phoenix, Arizona. After 2 years, RBC had grown to over 2000 attendees and Costi was sent to plant the Shepherd's House Bible Church in Chandler, Arizona.

Costi has pastored SHBC since 2022 and the church has since grown from just a few hundred to over 1200 in weekly attendance. The Christian Post reported on the church and interviewed Hinn about the unique culture that has developed there. The report details, "A critic might assume that Hinn only uses his platform to criticize prosperity theology. If one were to search 'Costi Hinn' online, they would have no problem finding coverage of Hinn's views on this." Hinn explains, "Google my name and find all sorts of spicy headlines...But you could walk with me through a day in the life and be in the most enjoyable meetings and discipleship culture you have seen."

== Media ministry ==
In 2020, after securing a seminary degree and serving for 8 years in the local church, Costi was not only versed in sound doctrine, but he had become acutely aware of how many people were being impacted by shallow or deceptive teaching. In an effort to help the thousands of people who had been emailing his church or coming with questions, Costi started For the Gospel, an online resource ministry dedicated to providing sound doctrine for everyday people. Since its inception in November 2020, FTG has reached over 100 million unique online users through podcasts, videos, and articles. Costi hosts the weekly "For the Gospel Podcast" which sees upwards of 100,000 downloads per month on Apple and Spotify platforms. Early in 2025, For the Gospel launched, "Por El Evangelio" to reach Spanish speakers with sound doctrine. Within 6 months, they were reaching over 5 million users per month through videos and sermons.

== Works ==
- Defining Deception. ISBN 978-0-9864442-4-1
- God, Greed, and the (Prosperity Gospel). ISBN 978-0-310-35527-4
- More Than a Healer. ISBN 978-0-310-36286-9
- Knowing the Spirit. ISBN 978-0-310-36677-5
- Walking in God's Will. ISBN 978-0-310-36680-5
- Knowing the Spirit. ISBN 978-0-310-36677-5

Hinn has also authored children's book alongside his wife.

- In Jesus' Name I Pray. ISBN 978-0-7369-8569-7.
- The King Who Found His Self-Control. ISBN 978-0-7369-8748-6.
- The Farmer Who Chose to Plant Kindness. ISBN 978-0-7369-8750-9.
- Earth's Epic Start. ISBN 978-0-7369-8980-0.
