= Midwestern Baptist Theological Seminary =

Christian higher education institution in Missouri

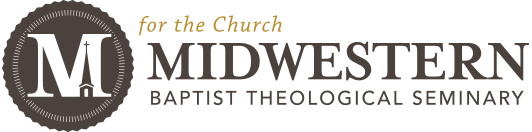
- Motto: For the Church
- Type: Private seminary
- Established: 1957
- Religious affiliation: Southern Baptist Convention
- President: Jason Keith Allen
- Provost: Jason G. Duesing
- Students: 3,840
- Undergraduates: 1,067
- Location: Kansas City, Missouri, United States
- Website: www.mbts.edu

Midwestern Baptist Theological Seminary (MBTS) is a private Baptist seminary in Kansas City, Missouri. It is affiliated with the Southern Baptist Convention. Midwestern Baptist Theological Seminary also houses an undergraduate college, Spurgeon College (formerly known as Midwestern College).

== History ==
Midwestern Seminary was officially founded on May 29, 1957, when the Southern Baptist Convention voted to establish the institution and elected a board of trustees. Since that time, the trustees have been regularly and exclusively elected by the Southern Baptist Convention. Under the leadership of the original board of trustees, the seminary was established in 1958 in northern Kansas City, Missouri, with six faculty members and 136 students. Most of the property on which the seminary is housed was donated by the Vivion family. The Vivion farmhouse has been restored and is now the official residence of the seminary's presidential family.

Doctrinally, MBTS is guided by the Baptist Faith and Message 2000. Every member of the faculty and administration is required to sign a statement agreeing to the precepts of this document. While students are required to be Christians, they are not required to affirm the Baptist Faith and Message 2000. The purpose statement of Midwestern Seminary was revised in 2008 to read, "Midwestern Baptist Theological Seminary serves the church by biblically educating God-called men and women to be and to make disciples of Jesus Christ."

Jason K. Allen was installed as president in 2012 and began revitalization. The seminary almost tripled in size in the next five years, becoming one of the fastest-growing seminaries in North America and one of the largest in the world. Enrollment has nearly tripled in five years, from 1,107 in the 2010–2011 academic year to surpassing 3,000 students in 2017–2018.

The seminary was granted an exception to Title IX in 2016, which legally allows it to discriminate against LGBT students for religious reasons.

=== For The Church ===
Since Allen's installation as president of Midwestern Seminary, the institution has emphasized "For The Church" as its vision statement for academic and institutional renewal, seeking to re-connect the purpose of theological education to the support and strengthening of local churches. This vision has been manifested in numerous events and resources, including Midwestern's website For The Church and the annual For The Church national conference held in Kansas City, which has featured internationally renowned speakers Matt Chandler, H.B. Charles Jr., Russell Moore, David Platt, and Ray Ortlund Jr.

=== Presidents ===
No.	Name	Term	Ref
1	Millard J. Berquist	1957–1973	
2 (Note: John P. Newport, professor at Southwestern Baptist Theological Seminary, was elected by the Midwestern Board of Trustees to be the second president but declined the post.)	Milton Ferguson	1973–1995	
3	Mark Coppenger	1995–1999	
(Note: Acting president)	Michael Whitehead	1999–2001	
4	R. Philip Roberts	2001–2012	
-	Robin D. Hadaway	2012	
5	Jason K. Allen	2012–present	

== Campus ==
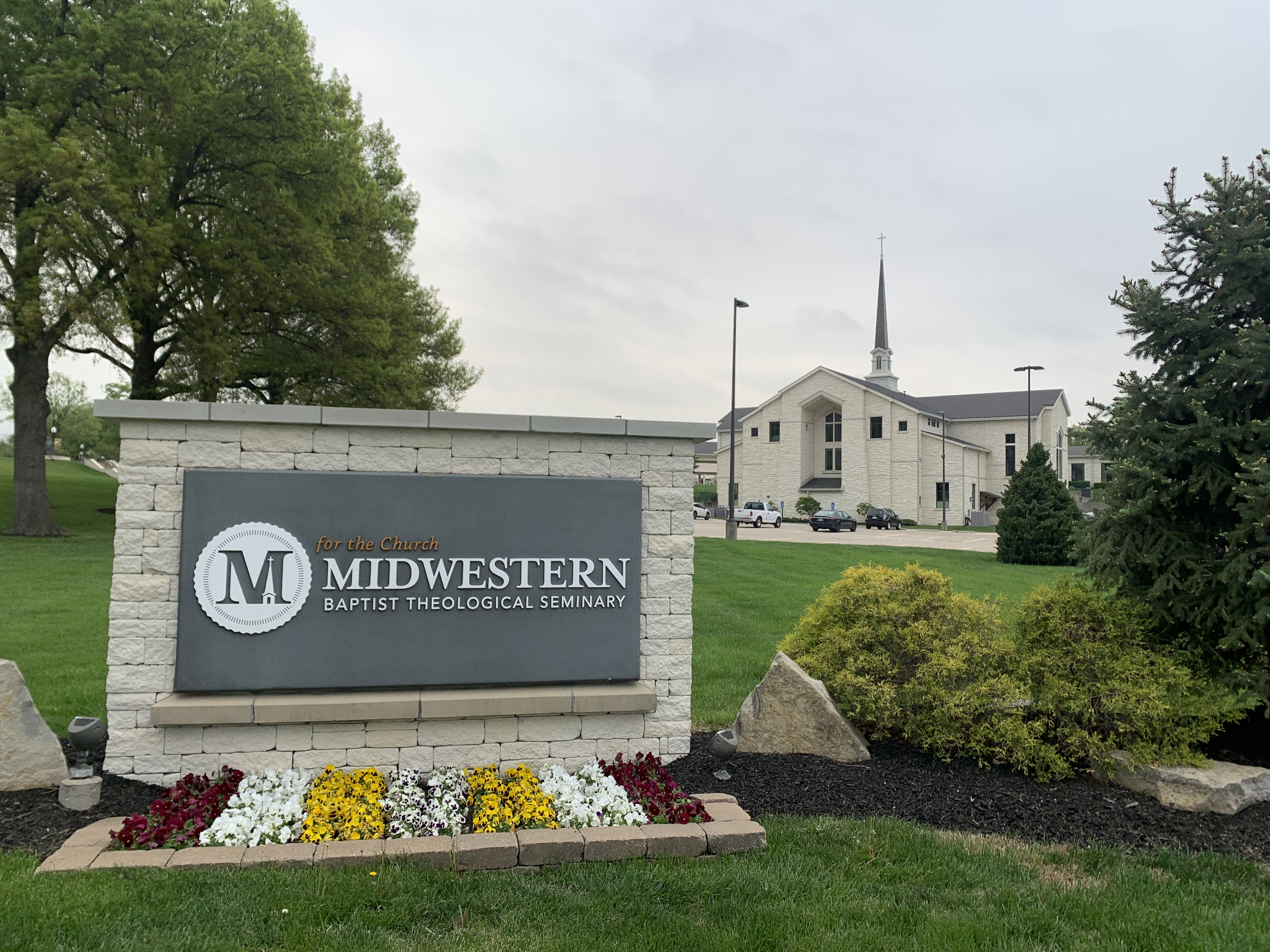
Midwestern Baptist Theological Seminary

Midwestern Seminary is located in Kansas City, Missouri, at the intersection of Vivion Rd. and N. Oak Trafficway, a few minutes from downtown. A new 1,000 seat auditorium, The Daniel Lee Chapel, was dedicated in April 2014. Other recent improvements to the campus include the O.S. Hawkins Courtyard and the Charles Spurgeon Library.

The campus includes dormitory and apartment buildings for residential students, playground and picnic areas, a modest fishing pond, and over 220 acres of woods. The Sword & Trowel Bookstore is also located on campus.

In 2016, the seminary announced plans to build a new Student Center on the north slope of the campus, using a $7 million lead gift by the Mathena family of Oklahoma City. Construction on this project—which includes a gymnasium, fitness center, faculty offices, cafeteria, coffee shop, bookstore, and expanded study center, and which includes exterior plans for sports fields—concluded in 2018. The 40,000 square foot center opened for the Fall 2018 semester.

=== The Spurgeon Center and Library ===
The Spurgeon Library houses the remaining personal collection of Charles Spurgeon, which Midwestern Seminary acquired from William Jewell College in 2006. The dedication of the library took place in October 2015, and the Seminary is now working to digitize the collection and publish new volumes of previously undiscovered sermons. Geoff Chang serves as the curator of the collection, which also includes artifacts from Spurgeon's life and ministry, among them his personal writing desk, travel kit, and the metalwork from his study door. The library interior is appointed in academic "Oxford style" and includes portraits highlighting the life of Spurgeon commissioned by Christian T. George and Midwestern Seminary of the Romanian artist Petru Botezatu.

== Academics ==
MBTS is accredited by the Association of Theological Schools in the United States and Canada (ATS) and the Higher Learning Commission (HLC). The seminary is accredited to offer several master's degrees that are generally classified as Master of Divinity (M.Div.) and Master of Arts. Midwestern also offers an MTS (Master of Theological Studies) degree and a Graduate Certificate in Christian Foundations for Lay Ministers.

At the doctoral level, MBTS offers professional doctorates: Doctor of Ministry (D.Min.), Doctor of Educational Ministry (D.Ed.Min.), and a Doctor of Philosophy in Biblical Studies. The seminary also has a Korean language track for its Doctor of Philosophy, Doctor of Educational Ministry, Doctor of Education, and Doctor of Ministry degrees and a Spanish language track for its Doctor of Ministry degree.

Spurgeon College offers a variety of undergraduate degrees in ministry, missions, and theology, as well as degrees in leadership, counseling psychology, and philosophy. Through the Accelerate program undergrads may earn both a Bachelor of Arts and a Master of Divinity degree simultaneously in a rigorous five-year course of study. Associate degrees are also available through the college. Undergrad students interested in pursuing a call to mission work may also participate in Midwestern's Fusion program, a training cohort partially funded by the International Mission Board of the Southern Baptist Convention which includes cultural studies, physical training, and stints overseas to better prepare future missionaries for the realities of their work.

Since 2010, Midwestern Seminary offers both graduate and undergraduate degrees entirely online, through the Online You program. Available degrees include the standard M.Div., MTS, and BA, with select concentrations available as well. Since at least 2017, Midwestern has also provided incentives for residential education, including the Timothy Track, which partners M.Div students with local churches to serve in internship programs, and The Residency, a contextual component of the standard doctoral program that facilitates immediate application of academic training.

== Notable alumni ==
- Costi W. Hinn, pastor and author
- Jerry Johnston, evangelical Christian pastor, author, and docu-filmmaker
- Jeff Lorg, former president of Gateway Baptist Theological Seminary

== Notable faculty ==
- Thomas S. Kidd, Research Professor of Church History and the John and Sharon Yeats Endowed Chair of Baptist Studies
