= Jeff Iorg =

American author and pastor

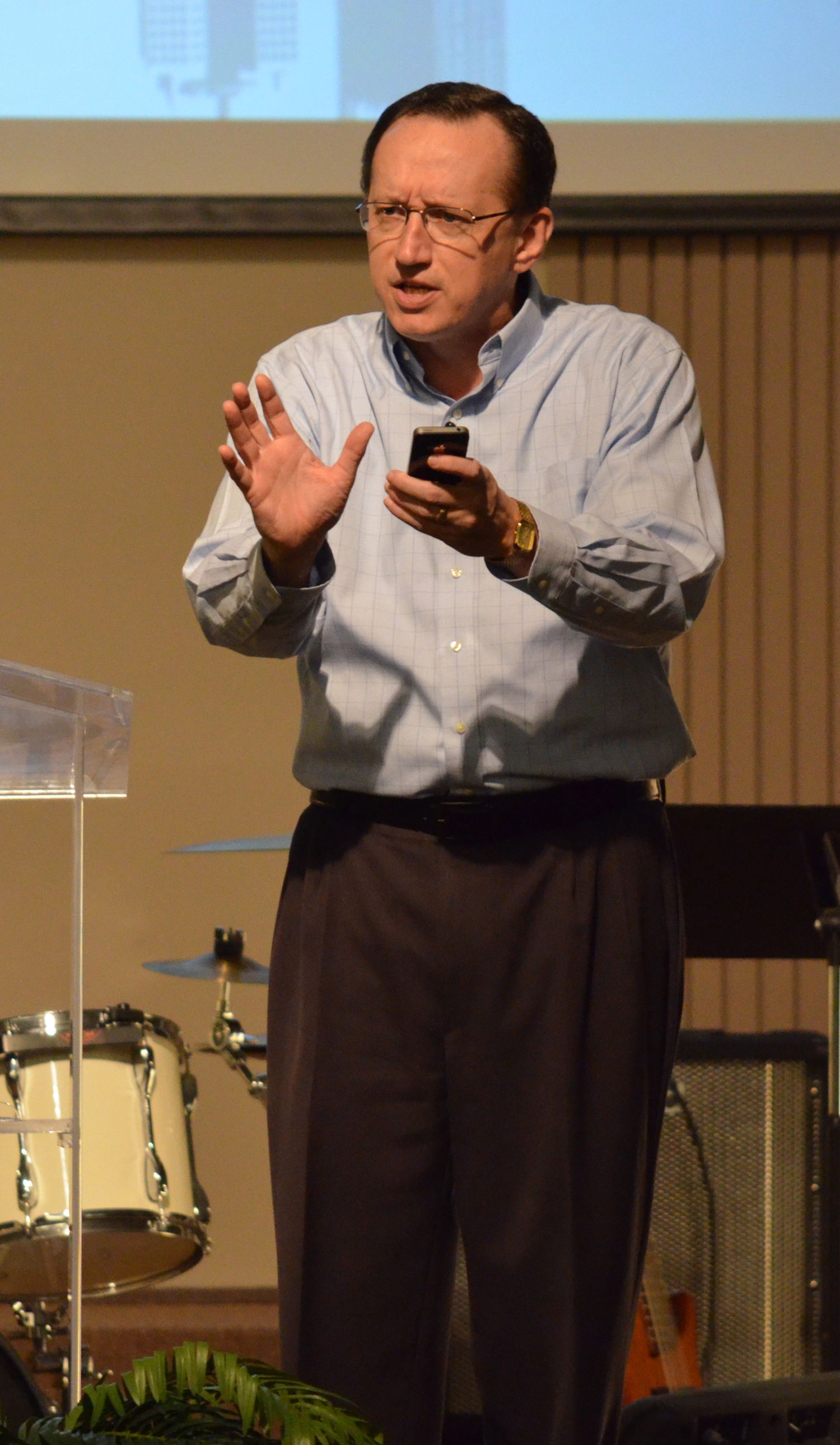
- Iorg speaking in February 2013
- Born: October 9, 1958 (age 67); Forsyth, Georgia
- Education: Hardin-Simmons University(B.A.); Midwestern Baptist Theological Seminary (M.Div); Southwestern Baptist Theological Seminary (D.Min)
- Title: President Emeritus, Gateway Seminary formerly Golden Gate Baptist Theological Seminary

Notes
- (Dr. Iorg's last name is pronounced like "forge" without the "f" or "George" without the "G")

Jeff P. Iorg (born October 9, 1958) is an American author, pastor, church planter, teacher, speaker, and former president of Gateway Seminary (formerly Golden Gate Baptist Theological Seminary), an entity of the Southern Baptist Convention with five campuses located in the Western United States.

== Early life and education ==
Dr. Iorg was born in Forsyth, Georgia, and grew up in Abilene, Texas. He earned his B.A. (1980) from Hardin Simmons University, his M.Div (1984) from Midwestern Baptist Theological Seminary, and his D.Min. (1990) from Southwestern Baptist Theological Seminary. His DMin projected is titled "Developing Effective Listening Skills for Personal Evangelism."

== Early career ==
Iorg began his career in pastoral ministry, serving in both his home state of Texas as well as in Missouri before becoming founding pastor of one of the largest Southern Baptist churches of the Northwest, Greater Gresham Baptist Church in Gresham, Oregon. He joined the faculty of Golden Gate's Pacific Northwest Campus in 1990, where he has taught preaching, evangelism and leadership. Iorg was executive director-treasurer of the Northwest Baptist Convention from 1995 until 2004, when he was elected to succeed William O. Crews as president of Golden Gate Baptist Theological Seminary (Now Gateway Seminary of the Southern Baptist Convention).

== Golden Gate to Gateway Seminary ==
After assuming the presidency at Golden Gate Seminary in 2004, Iorg reinstated the Ph.D. program under the direction of Dr. Richard Melick." While the seminary was in Mill Valley, he also served as the chaplain for the San Francisco Giants for 10 years. Significantly, Iorg facilitated the relocation and renaming of Golden Gate Seminary in Mill Valley, California into Gateway Seminary in Ontario, California. He personally recounts the story of the relocation in his book Leading Major Change in Your Ministry, published in 2018.

== Family life ==
He is married to Ann and has three adult children and five grandchildren. His hobbies include reading fiction, cheering on the Oregon Ducks, and searching for the world's best barbeque restaurant.

== Views ==
In 2017, Iorg signed the Nashville Statement.

== Publications ==
Iorg is the author of nine books:

- The Character of Leadership: Nine Qualities That Define Great Leaders (2007) ISBN 0805445323
- Is God Calling Me?: Answering the Question Every Leader Asks (2008) ISBN 0805447229
- The Painful Side of Leadership: Moving Forward Even When It Hurts (2009) ISBN 0805448705
- The Case for Antioch: A Biblical Model for a Transformational Church (2011) ISBN 1433671387
- Seasons of a Leader's Life: Learning, Leading, and Leaving a Legacy (2013) ISBN 978-1433681509
- Unscripted: Sharing the Gospel as Life Happens (2014) ISBN 978-1596694088
- Ministry in the New Marriage Culture (2015) ISBN 978-1596694088
- Leading Major Change in Your Ministry (2018) ISBN 978-1462774609
- Shadow Christians: Making an Impact When No One Knows Your Name (2020) ISBN 978-1535999090
