= Minerva G. Carcaño =

American Methodist bishop

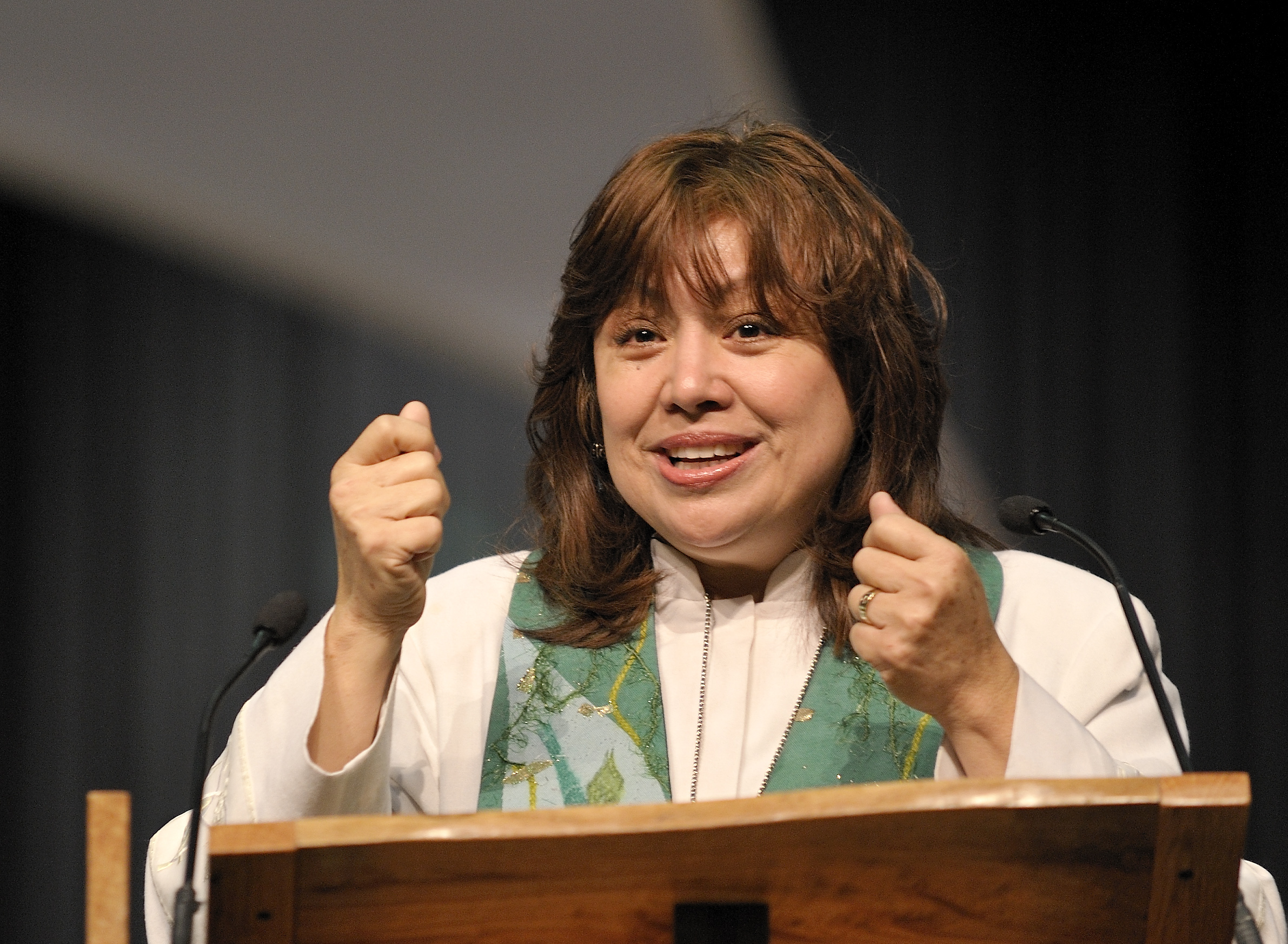
- Bishop Carcaño speaking at the 2008 United Methodist General Conference
- Denomination: The United Methodist Church

Current posting
- Judicatory: California-Nevada Annual Conference
- Title: Bishop
- Period in office: 2016-present
- Consecration: July 17, 2004
- Predecessor: Warner H. Brown, Jr.
- Ordination as Elder: June 1979
- Previous Episcopal Office: California-Pacific Annual Conference (2012 - 2016)
- Previous post: District Superintendent

Personal
- Date of birth: January 20, 1954 (age 72)
- Place of birth: Edinburg, TX, United States

Minerva Garza Carcaño (born January 20, 1954, in Edinburg, Texas) is the first Hispanic woman to be elected to the episcopacy of The United Methodist Church (UMC), the second-largest Protestant denomination in the United States. She was elected in 2004. Her first assignment was as Bishop of the Phoenix Episcopal Area of Desert Southwest Conference of the UMC. She was then appointed as Bishop of the California-Pacific Annual Conference of the UMC in 2012, and currently serves as Bishop of the California-Nevada Annual Conference of the UMC. She also serves as the leader of the United Methodist Church's Immigration Task Force.

== Biography ==
Carcaño was raised in Edinburg, Texas. Her early years of humble economic circumstances influenced her lifelong commitment to persons who face poverty and discrimination. Her ministry has included work with the poor, farm workers, immigrants, and refugees – including community organizing through the Industrial Areas Foundation.

Carcaño graduated from the University of Texas-Pan American in 1975 and received a Master of Theology from Perkins School of Theology of Southern Methodist University in 1979. She was ordained an elder in the United Methodist Church in 1979. She served as pastor in churches in Lubbock, TX, San Jose, CA, Crystal City, Carrizo Springs, and Hebbronville, McAllen in the early 1980s. In 1986 she became the first Hispanic woman to be appointed a United Methodist district superintendent, serving in that capacity in West Texas, New Mexico, and Portland, OR until 1992. From 1992 to 1996, Carcaño was the organizing pastor of the South Albuquerque Cooperative Ministry before becoming director of the Mexican American Program of Hispanic Studies Program at Perkins School of Theology. From 2004 to 2012, she served as the Phoenix, Arizona-based Bishop of the Phoenix Episcopal Area, providing leadership to the Desert Southwest Conference of The United Methodist Church. In 2012, she was appointed the Resident Bishop of the Los Angeles Episcopal Area, providing leadership in the California-Pacific Conference of The United Methodist Church.

Since September 1, 2016, she has served as the resident bishop of the San Francisco Episcopal Area, providing leadership in the California-Nevada Conference of The United Methodist Church. She and her husband, an attorney, have a teenaged daughter.

== Publications ==
In 2008, Carcaño authored "I Believe in Jesus," the annual Spiritual Growth Study for the United Methodist Women. It is published in both Spanish and English with a study guide by Glory Dharmaraj.

== Activism ==
=== Immigration ===
Bishop Carcaño has been a vocal advocate for comprehensive Immigration reform in the United States, speaking out on behalf of "hard working immigrants seeking only to support themselves and their families [who] are being treated in ways that not only violate their human and civil rights, but that undermine the very values upon which this country was built."

Out of her conviction that the church is "called by God to be a faith community of welcome," Carcaño has promoted a variety of ways to create dialogue, including "a bilateral ministry between Mexico and the United States" that is a natural way of "leading with a servant spirit and faithfulness." As a symbolic act of practical outreach to those who continue to risk crossing the deserts of the Southwest, Carcaño has also worked with Humane Borders in establishing water stations along known routes in the desert.

In February 2009, Bishop Carcaño spoke to the Interfaith Platform on Humane Immigration Reform, saying:

"As the suffering of immigrants and their families grows every day, we as people of faith long to bring healing to them and this land. As with people of all faiths, United Methodists stand with our immigrant brothers and sisters. Immigration reform that is just and humane is the only way to bring healing to our land."

In 2010, Bishop Carcaño joined other critics of Arizona's controversial "SB 1070" (also known as the Support Our Law Enforcement and Safe Neighborhoods Act) saying, "This bill does nothing to address any border security concerns" and declaring it "unwise, short sighted and mean spirited." In May, she traveled to Washington with other religious leaders to lobby Arizona's delegation to back comprehensive immigration reform. Carcaño said, "We will urge Sen. McCain to claim a bigger legacy than the one he has now."

=== LGBTQ+ ===
Bishop Carcaño has long been a supporter of the Lesbian, Gay, Bisexual, Transgender, Queer, pansexual and nonbinary community, including support of the Reconciling Ministries Network and other organizations seeking LGBTQ+ recognition within United Methodism. She has assured those working to change the official policy of the denomination that "We are working hard to create an inclusive church, confronting resistance to even conversation. Some of our colleagues are in the place of fear. But all I expect is integrity and respect in the conversation." During the 2008 General Conference of the United Methodist Church, Bishop Carcaño joined other Bishops and delegates in a witness in favor of full inclusion of gays and lesbians within the denomination.

In an article introducing newly elected Bishop Carcaño to the Phoenix Area, The Arizona Republic noted that she ‘supports full inclusion of gay and lesbian church members, including gay marriage.’ She was one of many clergy who publicly opposed and helped defeat Arizona Proposition 107 (2006) (which sought to ban gay marriage).

In May 2011, Bishop Carcaño participated in the Human Rights Campaign's Clergy Call for Justice and Equality in Washington, D.C. At a rally for the event, the Bishop's comments included:

"Hate and violence against persons, whether it is bullying in our schools, the taunting and violating of a person's privacy to the point of humiliating that person and destroying his or her sense of self worth and belonging, to beatings and even murder on our streets or on the outskirts of our towns, all because of a person's sexual orientation or gender identity, cannot be left unchallenged or unconquered. Such violence against our lesbian, gay, bisexual and transgender sisters and brothers is a violation of all that is good within us, and destroys the inherent human dignity of all of us."

== Interfaith Advocacy ==
In 2012, Carcaño was recognized by the Arizona Interfaith Movement (AZIFM) as a person who has "demonstrated 'living out' the Golden Rule objectives in their daily interaction with people and institutions in the community." She was honored at the 7th Annual Golden Rule Banquet in March 2012. Among the Bishop's Interfaith Advocacy acknowledged by AZIFM is her commitment to Immigration Reform and her work across religious and denominational boundaries to work with both local and national leaders, calling "upon Congress to take the moral and right first step to much needed humane immigration reform." Her initiative in organizing interfaith cooperation also includes her 2011 coordination of a variety of local Tucson religious leaders in joining together for an interfaith prayer service after the shooting of Congresswoman Gabby Giffords. Bishop Carcaño also serves on the board of the Claremont School of Theology, the "convening partner" school of Claremont Lincoln University. Claremont Lincoln is a multireligious university that seeks to find "the common threads among religious and ethical traditions – while honoring the distinctiveness of each."

== See also ==
- List of bishops of the United Methodist Church
