= Zan Wesley Holmes Jr. =

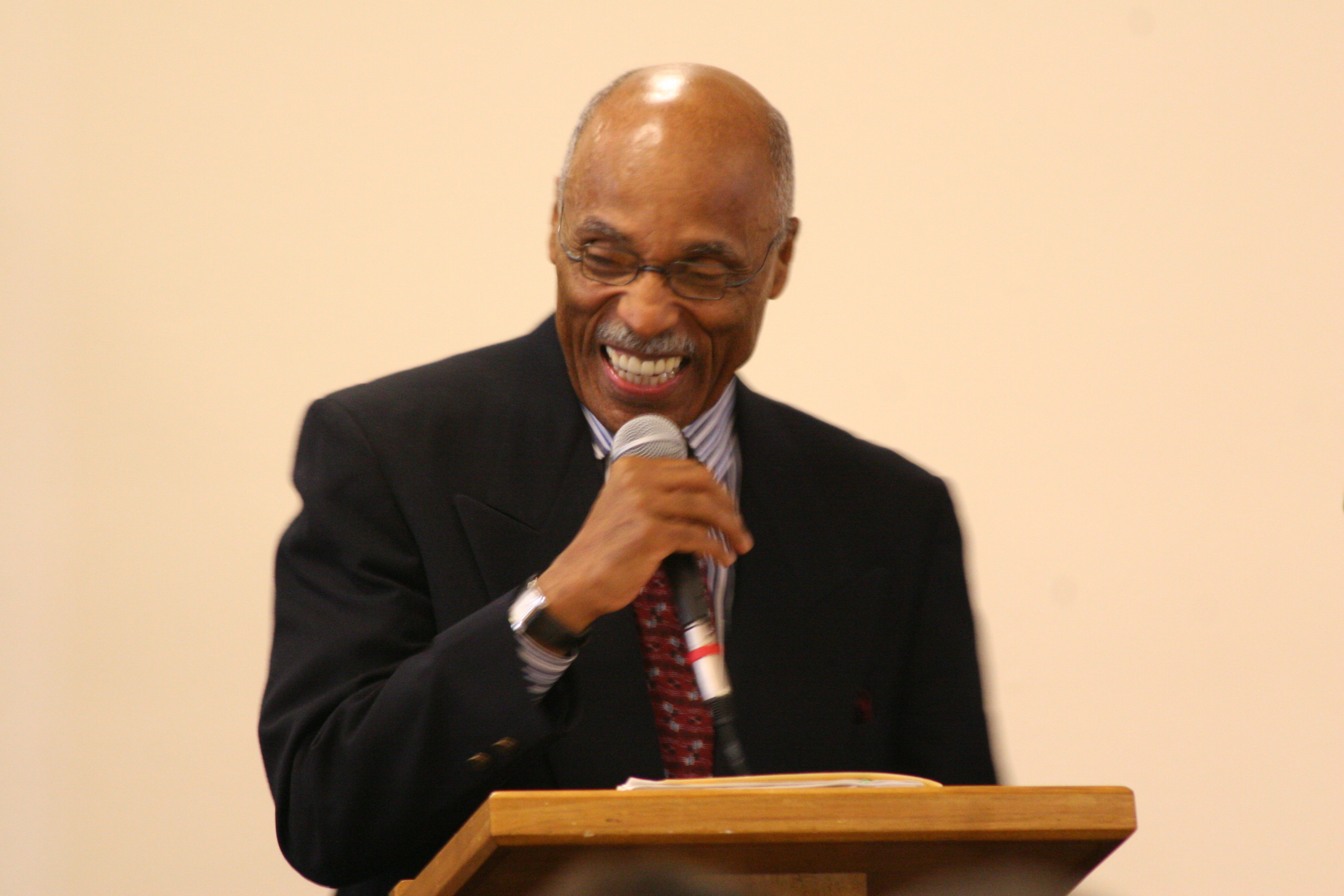
Rev. Dr. Zan Wesley Holmes Jr. speaks at a clergy luncheon at Suncreek United Methodist Church (Allen, TX) in 2006

Zan Wesley Holmes Jr. is Pastor Emeritus of St. Luke Community United Methodist Church in Dallas, Texas, where he served as Senior Pastor for 28 years.

== Life ==
Rev. Dr. Zan Wesley Holmes Jr. graduated cum laude from Huston–Tillotson University in Austin, Texas, and holds two graduate degrees from Perkins School of Theology at Southern Methodist University where he also served as Adjunct Professor of Preaching for 24 years.

Known as much for his community activism as his preaching and teaching, Holmes was elected to the Texas House of Representatives from 1968–1972, while he also served as a United Methodist District Superintendent. In 2001, he was recognized as one of the Civil Rights Movement’s “Invisible Giants” in the National Voting Rights Museum and Institute in Selma, Alabama.

Dr. Holmes is also known for his role as a narrator and host of the Disciple Bible Study video series produced by Abingdon Press. He also served on the Board of Regents of the University of Texas from 1991 to 1997. In 2012, the Dallas Independent School District named the newly-built Zan Wesley Holmes Jr. Middle School in his honor.

Pastor Holmes is a member of Alpha Phi Alpha fraternity and is an active lifetime member of the NAACP.

He and his wife, Carrie, and grand daughter Savannah reside in Dallas, Texas, and Los Angeles, California.

== Publications ==
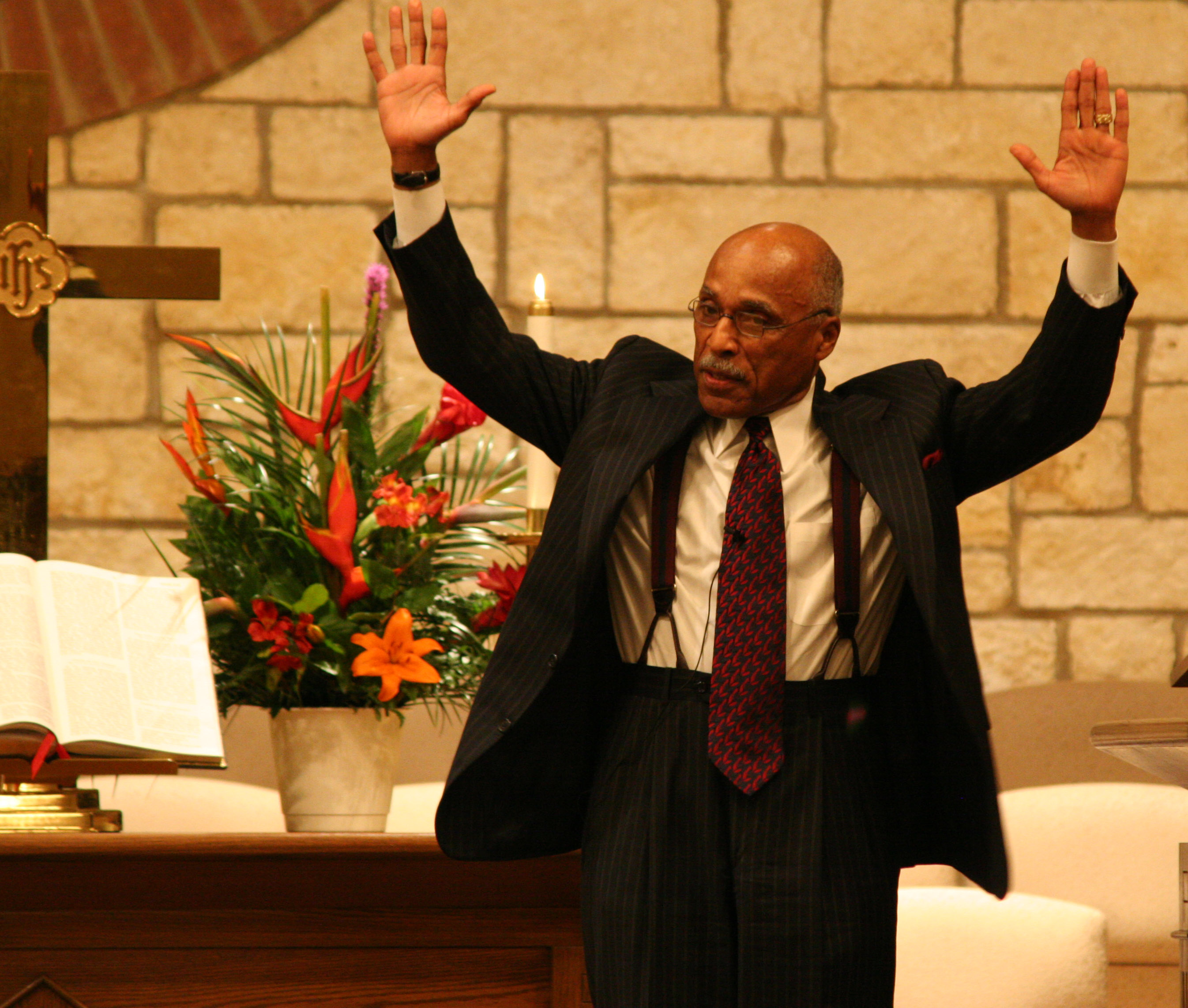
Rev. Dr. Zan Wesley Holmes Jr. preaching at Suncreek United Methodist Church (Allen, Texas) in 2006

He is the author of:

- Reaching for Revival (1991),
- Encountering Jesus (1992), and
- When Trouble Comes (1996).

Holmes has also written chapters in Our Time under God is Now (1993) and in Power in the Pulpit: How America’s Most Effective Black Preachers Prepare their Sermons (2002).
