= Suncreek United Methodist Church =

Suncreek United Methodist Church is a United Methodist Church in Allen, Texas, part of the Horizon Texas Conference of The UMC. In June 1995, Rev. Burt Palmer was appointed to begin a new United Methodist Church in Allen. By September of that year, three families were gathering to worship at the parsonage. The group grew, and by the end of that year, Sunday morning worship moved to Green Elementary School. Then, on September 22, 1996, Suncreek was officially constituted as a United Methodist Church. In early 1999, the church began to build on property at Suncreek and McDermott Drives. This involved renovating a home that was on the site and adding additional rooms for a Sanctuary and classes. In September 1999, the church left Green Elementary and began meeting in the new buildings. Rev. Kathleen Baskin-Ball was appointed Senior Pastor of Suncreek in June 2001. The following May, the church gathered for a Sunday morning worship service under a large tent to kickoff a capital campaign that would purchase land, renovate the existing building, erect a new building and Sanctuary, and add parking. One year later, the church broke ground on this phase of its development. The new building was completed in April 2004 and consecrated by Bishop William B. Oden on May 23, 2004. In early 2007, Rev. Kathleen Baskin-Ball was diagnosed with cancer. Despite the challenges of her illness and treatment, she continued to lead, serve and love the congregation until her death on December 2, 2008. One of Kathleen's favorite ministerial duties was performing baptisms. We desire to remember her with the beautiful Garden in our esplanade just south of the breezeway connecting the sanctuary with the children's area. Rev. Dr. Thomas O. Palmer was appointed as Senior Pastor in June, 2009 and served until June, 2013. He now serves as Senior Pastor of Coppell United Methodist Church. Rev. Dr. Keith Payne Boone was appointed as Senior Pastor in June, 2013 and served until June, 2016. He now serves as Senior Pastor of University Park United Methodist Church in Dallas. Rev. Dr. Barry Hughes was appointed as Senior Pastor in June, 2016.
