= William Kenneth Pope =

Methodist bishop

William Kenneth Pope was a bishop of The Methodist Church, elected in 1960. He was elected by the South Central Jurisdictional Conference of the Church and assigned the Arkansas Episcopal Area, encompassing the North Arkansas and Little Rock Conferences; and then the North Texas and Central Texas Annual Conferences, where he served from 1964 until his retirement in 1972. After retirement he served as Bishop-in-Residence at the Perkins School of Theology, Southern Methodist University. He was a former chairman of the University's regents. He lived in Dallas, Texas. He was a member of Lambda Chi Alpha fraternity.

Bishop Pope died of natural causes Monday, June 26, 1989. He was 87 years old. He was survived by a daughter, Katherine Pope of Southport, Connecticut; and a son, Kenneth, of Norwalk, Connecticut.

== See also ==
- List of bishops of the United Methodist Church
