= Julie Pennington-Russell =

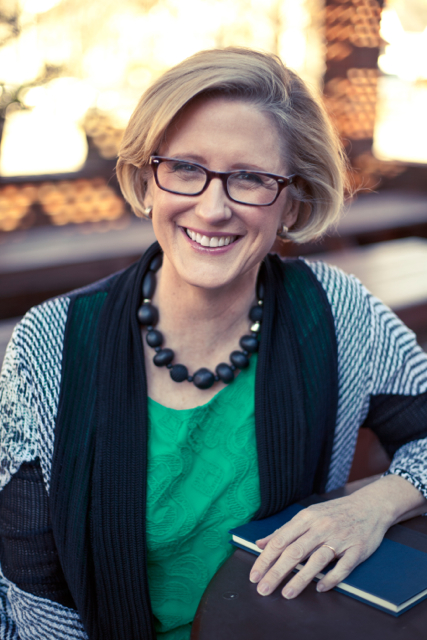
- Born: July 4, 1960 (age 66)
- Education: B.A. University of Central Florida in Orlando, M.Div Golden Gate Baptist Theological Seminary
- Spouse: Tim
- Children: Taylor, Lucy
- Church: The First Baptist Church of the City of Washington, D. C.
- Congregations served: Nineteenth Avenue Baptist Church, San Francisco, California (1985-1998); Calvary Baptist Church, Waco, Texas (1998-2007); First Baptist Church, Decatur, Georgia (2007-2015); First Baptist Church of the City of Washington, D. C. (2016 - present).
- Title: The Reverend

Julie Pennington-Russell is a prominent Baptist minister in the United States of America. She currently serves as senior pastor at the First Baptist Church of the City of Washington, D. C. Her ministry has provoked controversy due to disagreements concerning women in church leadership.

== Biography ==
Pennington-Russell received a B.A. in communicative disorders from the University of Central Florida in Orlando in 1981, and an M.Div. from the Golden Gate Baptist Theological Seminary in Mill Valley, California, in 1985.

Her first position was at Nineteenth Avenue Baptist Church in San Francisco, where she was associate pastor and then pastor (1985-1998). She was then pastor of Calvary Baptist Church in Waco, Texas (1998-2007), before being called as lead pastor of the First Baptist Church of Decatur, Georgia (2007-2015). Julie Pennington-Russell began her current pastorate at the First Baptist Church of the City of Washington, D.C., in January, 2016.

She currently serves as a member of the advisory board for the religion department of Carson-Newman University and has served as a trustee for Mercer University, member of the board for the Center for Christian Music Studies at Baylor University, and member of the board of directors for the New Evangelical Partnership for the Common Good. Her messages have been featured on the television broadcast 30 Good Minutes, Day1 Radio and at the Festival of Homiletics.

She has been married since 1988 to Tim Pennington-Russell, a website designer and musician. They have two adult children, Taylor and Lucy.

== Controversy ==
Pennington-Russell's ministerial appointments have highlighted the ongoing dispute among Christians regarding women in leadership roles. While the Baptist tradition emphasizes the autonomy of individual churches, many Baptists in the U. S. are opposed to female pastors.

Her first position at Nineteenth Avenue Baptist Church in San Francisco prompted repeated attempts to have the church removed from the state Baptist Convention.

In 1998, her second pastorate at Calvary Baptist Church (Waco, Texas) made her the first woman to serve as senior pastor of a Southern Baptist congregation in Texas. This was widely reported in the press, and members of an unrelated Independent Fundamental Baptist church picketed the church in protest. Two years later, the Southern Baptist Convention revised its doctrinal statement, the Baptist Faith and Message, to explicitly state that women are not permitted to be pastors.

Her move to First Baptist Church of Decatur in 2007 provoked further controversy and media coverage. It resulted in the church's being expelled from the Georgia Baptist Convention, the state branch of the Southern Baptist Convention. The issues leading up to the expulsion were strongly criticized by Southern Baptist pastor Wade Burleson. The church remained affiliated to the Cooperative Baptist Fellowship, a smaller grouping which affirms women in ministry.

Albert Mohler, president of the Southern Baptist Theological Seminary, wrote that First Baptist Church of Decatur is "the largest church associated with the Southern Baptist Convention or the Cooperative Baptist Fellowship to call a woman as senior minister" and "For a church of this stature to call a woman as senior minister is undeniably historic."
