= William Pope (naturalist) =

English-Canadian naturalist and painter (1811-1902)

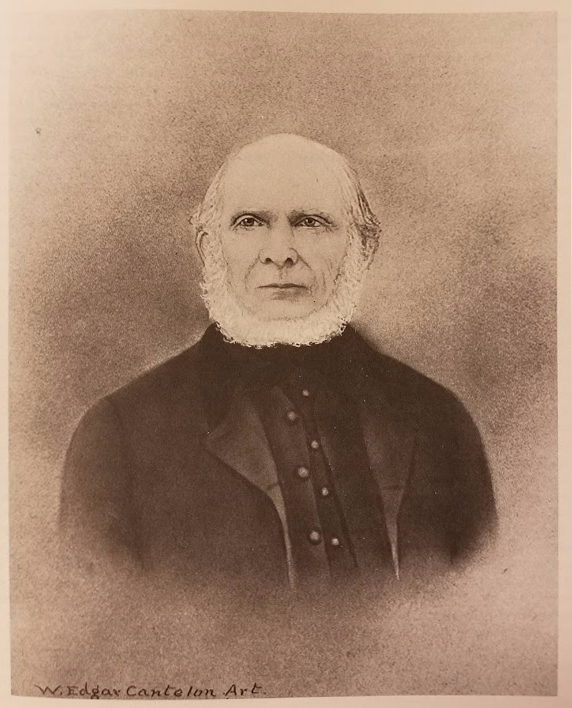
- Born: 8 January 1811; Maidstone, Kent, England
- Died: 1902 (aged 90–91)
- Known for: Painter of birds

William Pope (8 January 1811 – 1902) was an English-Canadian naturalist and amateur painter who lived most of his life in Ontario, Canada. Notable wildlife artist Fenwick Lansdowne stated that Pope "gave us the first comprehensive, well executed pictorial record of Canadian birds." According to Pope's biographer, Pope contributed "a great deal" to Canada's settler heritage through his paintings and journals.

Pope's watercolours of birds are often compared to the works of John James Audubon, though Pope's works were smaller in size and ambition.

== Life and art ==
William Pope was born on 8 January 1811 in Maidstone, Kent, England and attended art school in London. Born into a wealthy family, Pope had the means "to indulge in his two favourite pursuits, shooting and painting."

In 1834, Pope came to North America for the first time. He traveled in the United States, eventually moving on to what is now southwestern Ontario (then Upper Canada). He later began searching for birds in the backwoods of Upper Canada between 1834 and 1835. By 1847, he had painted almost 100 works. After travelling back and forth between England and Canada, Pope took permanent residence in Canada in 1859, living in Port Ryerse, Norfolk County, Ontario.

As a "sportsman-naturalist", Pope hunted birds as well as painting them. Many of his works used watercolours, plus fine details added with pen and ink. A few of his works were landscapes but most of his wildlife paintings did not have elaborate backgrounds. Pope also wrote on the behaviour of the subjects in his drawings, writings which are summarized in Harry B. Barrett's biography of Pope, The 19th Century Journals & Paintings of William Pope.

After Pope's death in 1902, his son William E. Pope took over his father's farm.

== Legacy ==
In 1894, James Bain, chief librarian for Toronto Public Library, acquired a book of William Pope's original paintings from a used bookstore in London, England. In 1916, Pope's grandson sold 150 of his grandfather's watercolours to John Ross Robertson, who commented that "it would be a crime if these pictures were to leave the country." Robertson donated the paintings to Toronto Public Library, where they were first displayed on 29 January 1917.

The works later underwent significant conservation treatment at the library.

A commemorative plaque about Pope was installed by the Ontario Heritage Foundation in the County of Norfolk, Ontario.

== Gallery ==
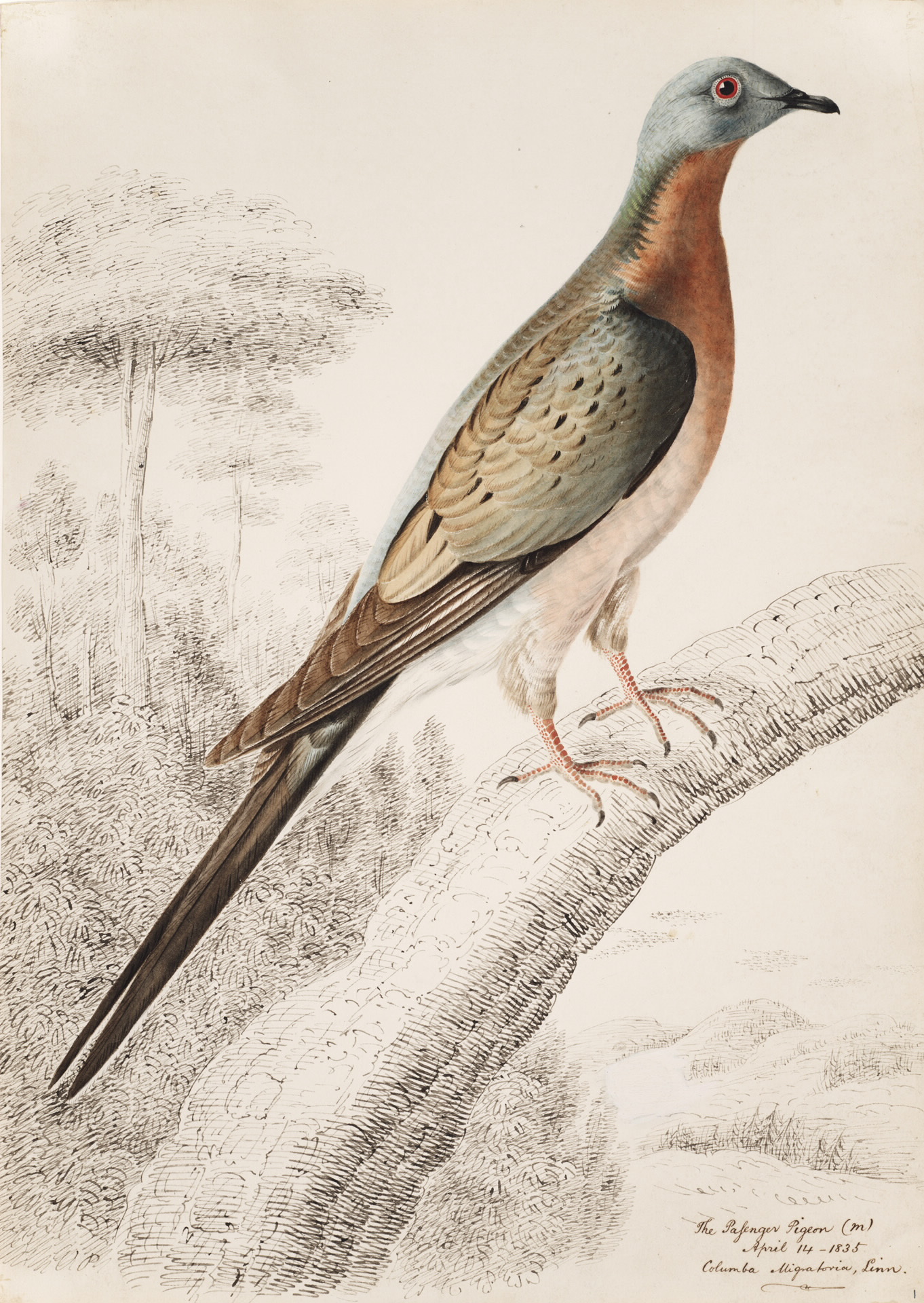
The Passenger Pigeon (Male), pen and watercolour, 1835

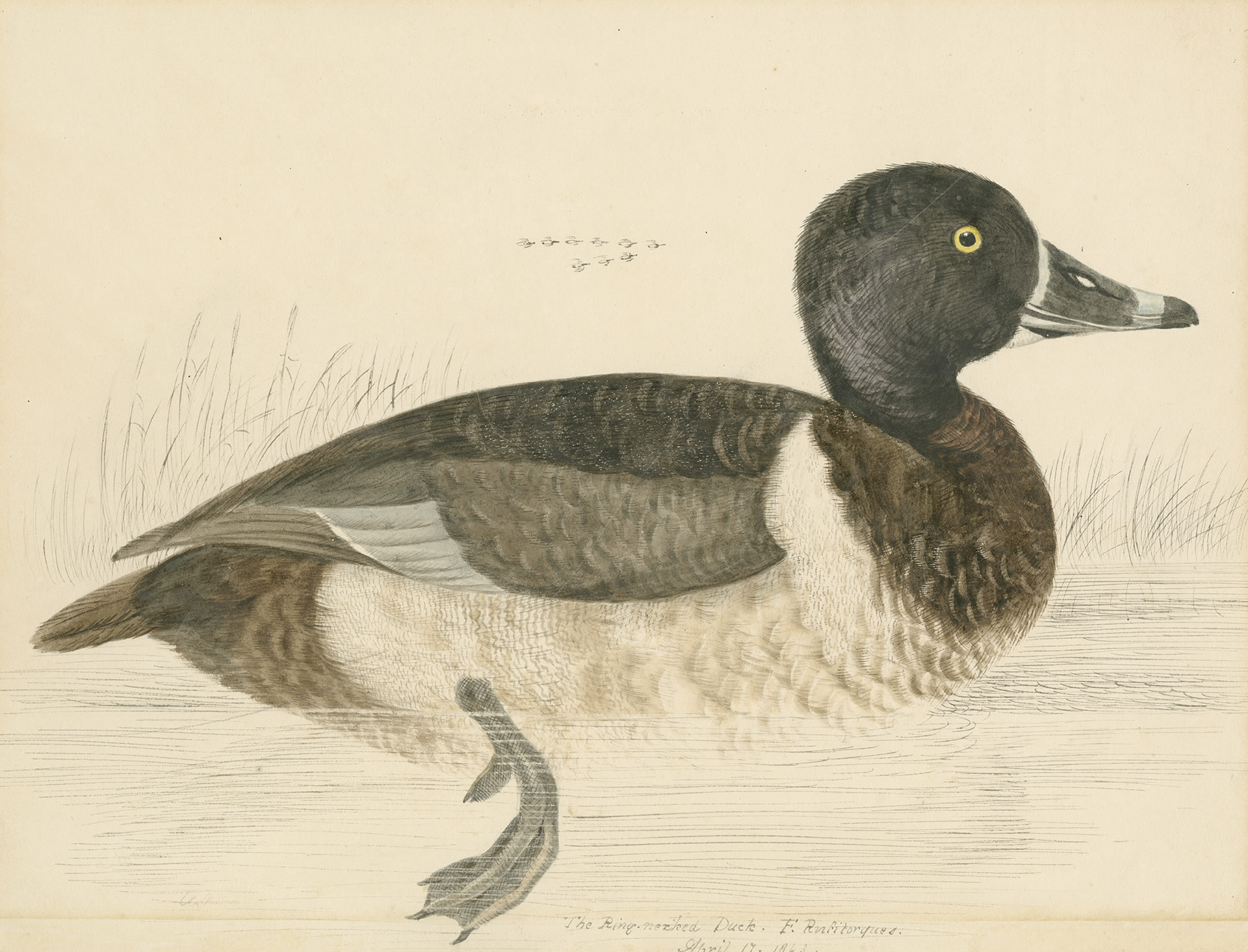
Ring-Necked Duck, pen and watercolour, 1843

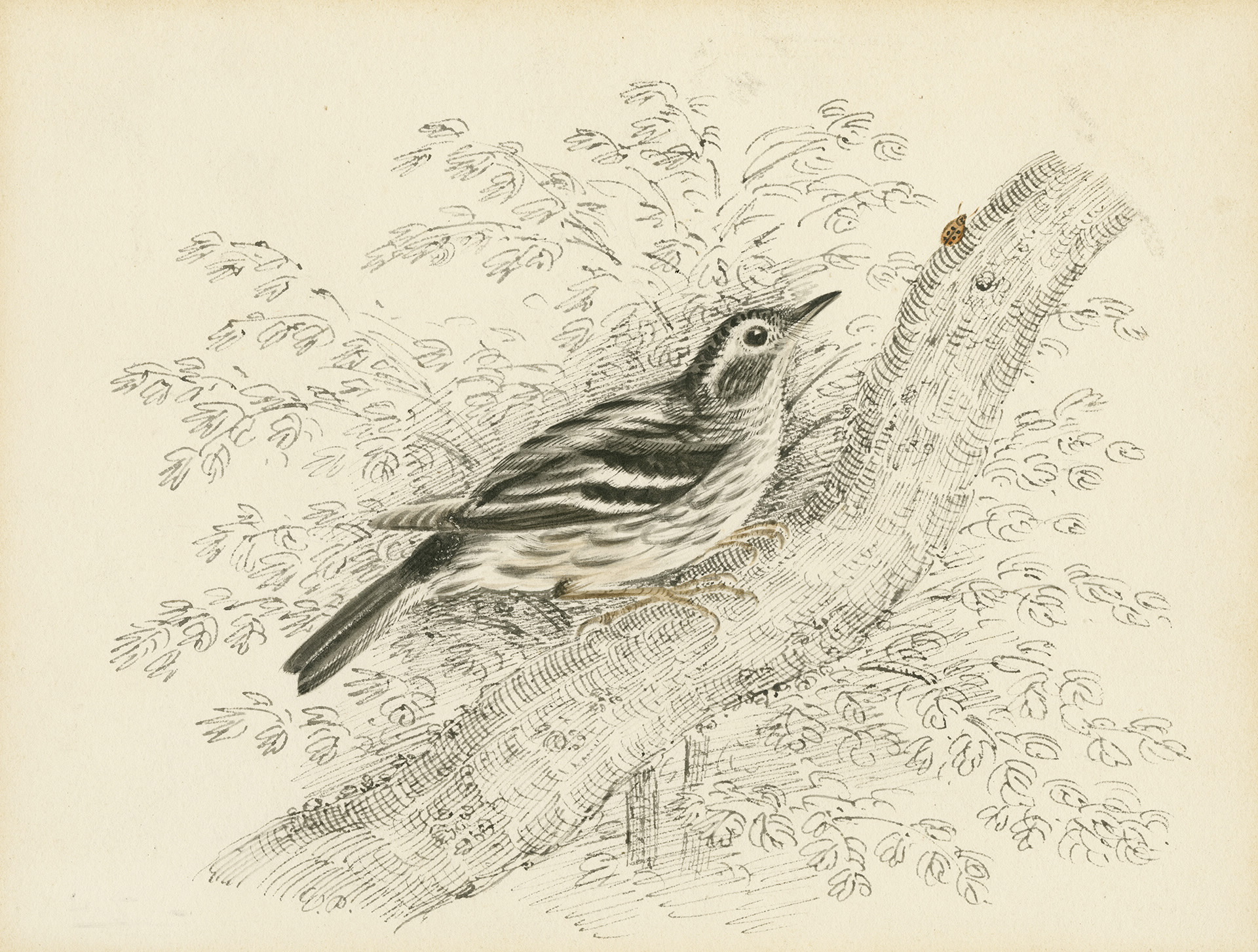
Black and White Warbler, pen and watercolour, 1845

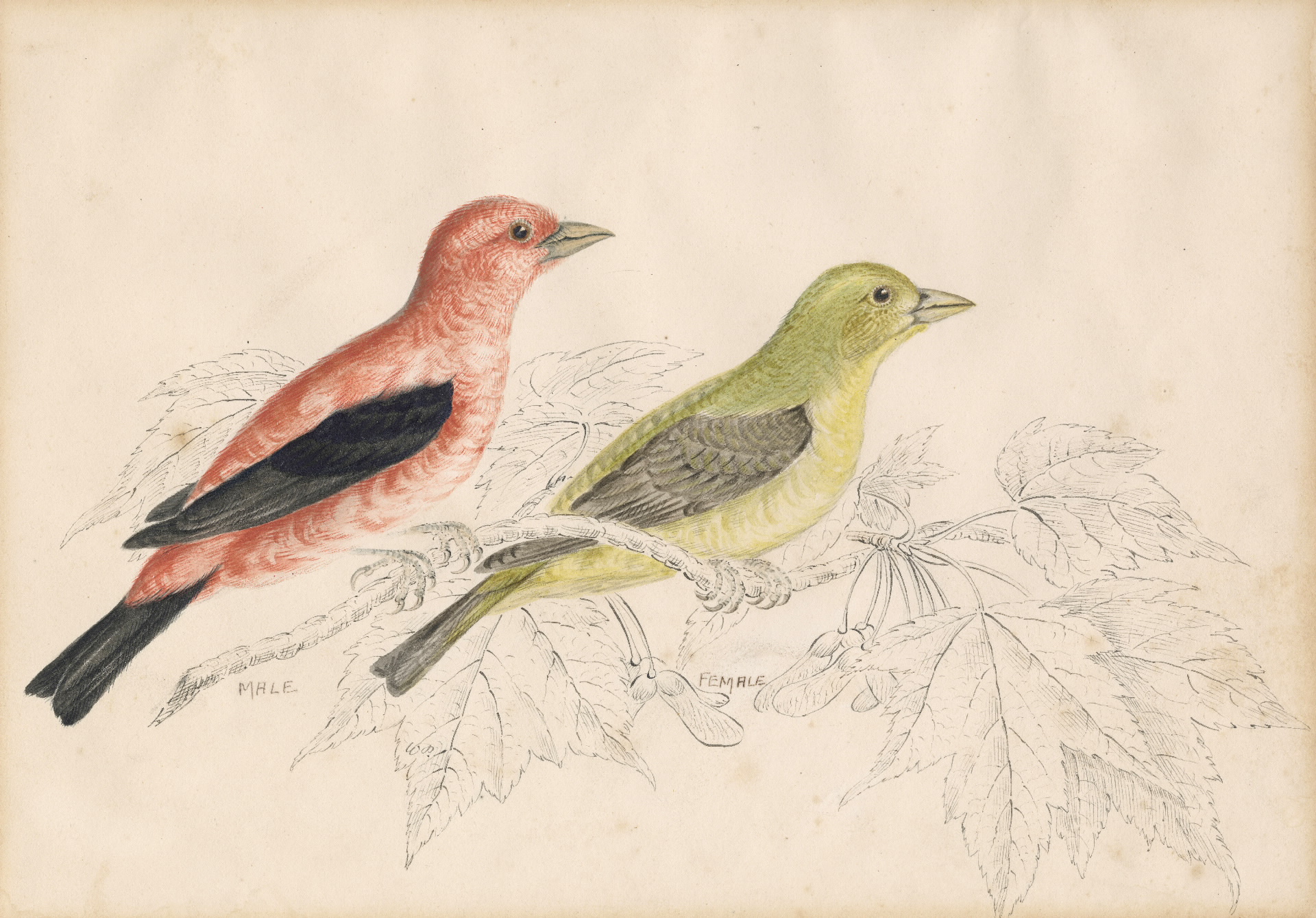
Scarlet Tanager, watercolour, 1859

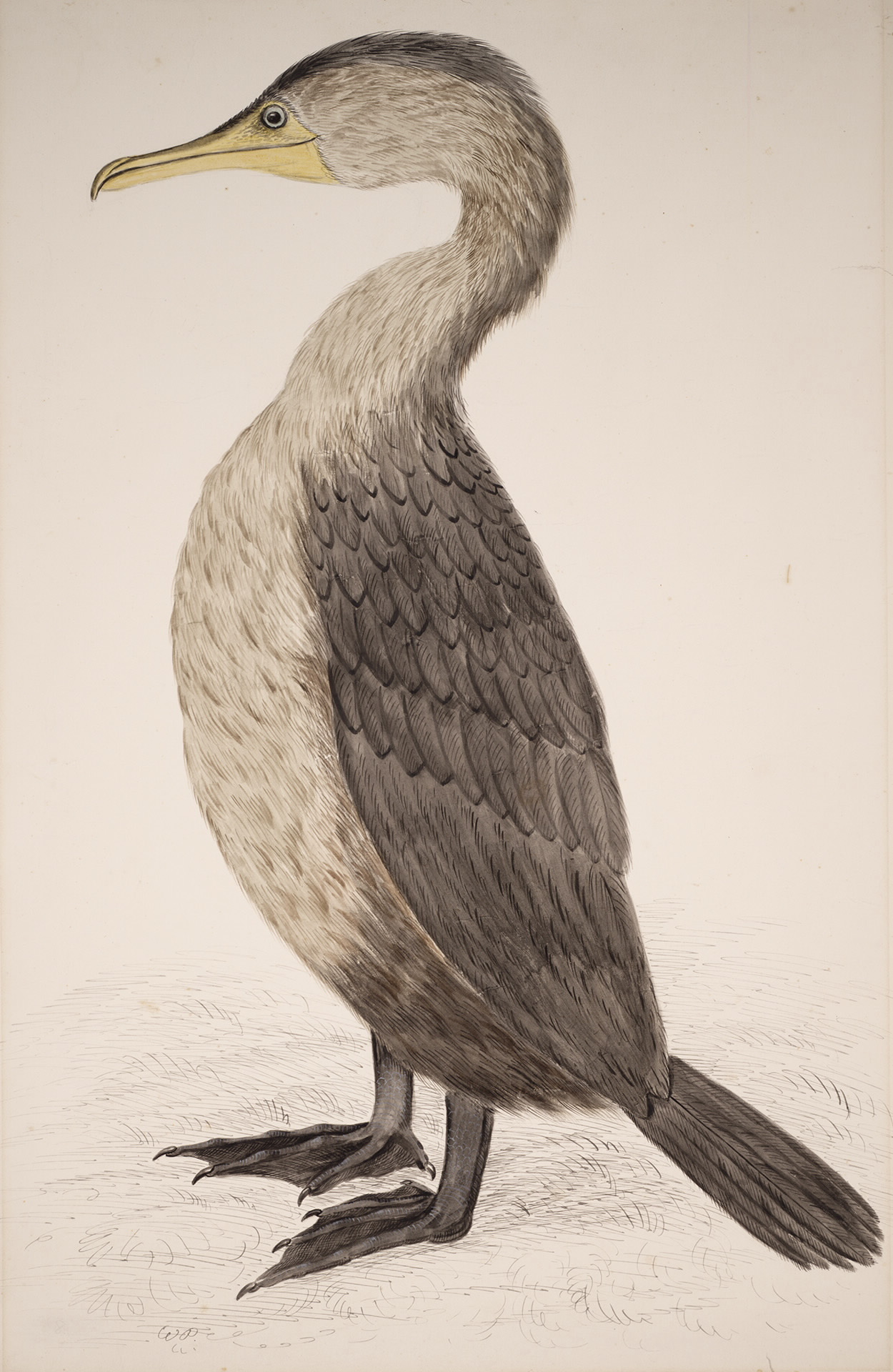
Double-Crested Cormorant, pen and watercolour, 1865
