= Elizabeth Clark =

Elizabeth Clark(e) may refer to:

- Elizabeth A. Clark, (1938–2021), American scholar, Late Antiquity and early Christian History
- Elizabeth Clark (author) (1875–1972), English story teller, lecturer, author
- Elizabeth Hodges Clark, American museum assistant and scientific illustrator
- Elizabeth Clark, Polish artist, part of art duo Liz-N-Val
- Elizabeth Thomson Clark (1918–1978), Scottish poet and playwright known as Joan Ure
- Elizabeth Clarke (c. 1565–1645), English woman accused of witchcraft
- Elizabeth Clarke Wolstenholme-Elmy (1833–1918), English essayist and poet
- Liz Clarke, American sportswriter
- Elizabeth Martha Brown (1811–1856), née Clark
- Beth Clark (born 1972), New Zealand football player

== See also ==
- Eliza Clark (disambiguation)
