= Eliza Clark =

Eliza Clark may refer to:

- Eliza Clark (American writer), American actress and screenwriter
- Eliza Clark (British author), British author of Boy Parts and Penance
- Eliza Clark (Canadian author) (born 1963), Canadian author
- Eliza Clark Garrett (1805–1855), née Clark, American educator and philanthropist
- Eliza Clark Hughes (1817–1882), American physician

== See also ==
- Elizabeth Clark (disambiguation)
