= Francis Enmer Kearns =

Bishop Francis Enmer Kearns
- Church: United Methodist Church
- Province: Ohio East Episcopal Area
- Diocese: East Ohio Annual Conference
- Elected: 1964
- In office: 1964–1976
- Predecessor: First holder
- Successor: James Samuel Thomas

Orders
- Ordination: 1931
- Consecration: 1964 North Central Jurisdictional Conference

Personal details
- Born: December 12, 1905 Bentleyville, Pennsylvania, United States
- Died: January 29, 1992 (aged 86) Alliance, Ohio, United States
- Denomination: Methodism
- Spouse: Alice Thompson (m. 1933)
- Children: Rollin T., Francis E. Jr., Margaret Baldwin
- Profession: Pastor, professor, bishop, musician
- Education: Ohio Wesleyan University; Boston University School of Theology; University of Pittsburgh

Francis Enmer Kearns (12 December 1905 – 29 January 1992) was a Methodist pastor, a professor of English, a member of denominational boards and agencies, a bluegrass musician, a bishop of The Methodist Church and the United Methodist Church (elected in 1964), and a visiting professor of a United Methodist Theological Seminary. He was the first resident bishop of the Ohio East Episcopal Area of The Methodist/United Methodist Church.

== Early years ==
Kearns was born in Bentleyville, Pennsylvania, the son of George V. and Jennie May (McCleary) Kearns. He married Alice Thompson 1 September 1933, and they had three children.

== Education ==
Kearns graduated from Bentleyville High School. He earned a bachelor's degree from Ohio Wesleyan University and a B.D. degree from Boston University School of Theology. In 1930 he was awarded a Jacob Sleeper Fellowship for post-graduate studies in theology in Berlin, Germany and Edinburgh, Scotland. He completed his doctorate at the University of Pittsburgh in 1939.

Kearns also received honorary degrees from several Ohio schools, including Mount Union College.

== Ordained ministry ==
The Rev. Kearns began his ministry in the Western Pennsylvania Annual Conference of the Methodist Episcopal Church in 1931. He served the following appointments in Pennsylvania: Dravosburgh; Christ Church (now First United Methodist Church) in Pittsburgh, Ben Avon, Uniontown, and Asbury.

In 1945, Kearns was appointed senior minister of the Wauwatosa Avenue Methodist Church in Milwaukee, Wisconsin, where he served until elected a bishop.

== Episcopal ministry ==
Kearns was elected to the episcopacy by the 1964 North Central Jurisdictional Conference of the Methodist Church and assigned to the newly created Ohio East Episcopal Area. During his 12 years as the resident bishop of the East Ohio Annual Conference, he saw many strategic changes made, being a steady guide as those changes took place. Chief among these events was the uniting of the Evangelical United Brethren and Methodist conferences in Northeastern Ohio.

Kearns served on various denominational boards, was a delegate to World Methodist Conferences in Europe and the United States, was a member of the Rotary Club of Sebring and a 33rd degree Mason.

Kearns retired from the active episcopacy in 1976, becoming a visiting professor at the Methodist Theological School in Ohio. In 1988 he and his wife moved to Copeland Oaks, a retirement complex in Sebring, Ohio, related to the United Methodist Church.

== Death ==
Bishop Kearns died of cancer and heart complications 29 January 1992 at Alliance, Ohio. His memorial service was held 4 February 1992 at Church of the Savior U.M. Church in Canton, Ohio. Bishop Edwin C. Boulton presided at the service, assisted by Bishop Judith Craig and Van Bogard Dunn, former Dean of M.T.S.O. Interment was in Oak Grove Cemetery, Delaware, Ohio. He was survived by his wife, his sons, Rollin T. and Francis E., Jr., and his daughter, Mrs. Margaret Baldwin.

== Episcopal remembrance ==
Bishop Boulton noted at Bishop Kearns' memorial service that at the service of consecration when Kearns was elected Bishop, he and Alice were asked,

Will you show yourself gentle, and be merciful for Christ's sake to poor and needy people, and to all strangers destitute of help? Will you maintain and set forward, as much as lieth in you, quietness, love, and peace among all men; and faithfully exercise such discipline in the Church as shall be committed unto you?

Bishop Boulton then remarked, "Francis said he would, with the help of God. And they did." Bishop Boulton concluded by saying:

The 86 years of Francis Kearns were empowered by great affirmations. But undergirding all the rest, making it the supreme affirmation of his life was this: 'For I am convinced that there is nothing in death or life,...nothing in all creation that can separate us from the love of God in Christ Jesus our Lord.' (Romans 8:38a, 39b) That's why on the night he died Francis could say to his wife and daughter in his hospital room, 'Turn off the lights now, let's go to bed.'

Religious titles
Preceded by first one	Resident Bishop, Ohio East Episcopal Area, United Methodist Church; 1964-1976	Succeeded by James Samuel Thomas

== See also ==
- List of bishops of the United Methodist Church
