= Don Wendell Holter =

American bishop (1905–1999)

Don Wendell Holter (24 March 1905 – 12 September 1999) was an American bishop of the United Methodist Church, elected in 1972. He was born in Lincoln, Kansas, a son of Henry O. and Lenna Mater Holter.

== Education ==
Don graduated from Baker University in 1927 (A.B.). He then attended Harvard University and Garrett Theological Seminary, earning his Bachelor of Divinity from Garrett in 1930. Don went on to earn his Ph.D. in Church History at the University of Chicago in 1934. Bishop Holter received honorary doctorates from Baker University, Westmar College, Dakota Wesleyan University, and St. Paul School of Theology.

== Ordained, missionary, and academic ministry ==
Don was ordained deacon by Bishop Ernest Lynn Waldorf and elder by Bishop Charles L. Mead, in the Kansas Annual Conference of the M.E. Church. His first pastoral appointment was as assistant minister at the Euclid Avenue Church in Oak Park, Illinois beginning in 1931 while Don was still a seminarian. From 1935 until 1940, Dr. Holter was minister at the Central Methodist Church in Manila and professor at Union Theological Seminary there. From 1940 until 1945 he was president of the seminary.

In 1938 Dr. Holter served as chairman of the Philippines delegation to the International Mission Conference in Madras, India, a delegation which included Dr. Frank Laubach. For three years the Holter family was interned by the Japanese during World War II. They returned to the U.S. in May, 1945. Dr. Holter spent the next year itinerating for the Methodist Missions Board. During 1946–49 he was the pastor of Hamline Methodist Church in St. Paul, Minnesota.

In 1949 Dr. Holter joined the faculty of Garrett Theological Seminary as Professor of Church History and Missions. In 1958 he spent four months on a special study mission to Africa, including several days spent with Dr. Albert Schweitzer at Lambaréné. On 1 January 1959 Dr. Holter became the founding president of Saint Paul School of Theology, a position he held until his election to the episcopacy.

Dr. Holter was elected a delegate to U.M. General Conferences (1964–72), serving in 1968 and 1970 as the chairman of the Legislative Committee on Ministry. He also held positions of leadership in his Annual Conference as well as on General Church Agencies.

== Episcopal ministry ==
Bishop Holter was elected by the South Central Jurisdictional Conference of the U.M. Church in 1972. He was assigned to the Nebraska Episcopal Area, serving one quadrennium before retiring in 1976.

== Selected writings ==
- Fire on the Prairie: Methodism in the History of Kansas.
- Flames on the Plains: History of United Methodism in Nebraska.
- The Lure of Kansas: The Story of Evangelicals and United Brethren, 1853–1968.

== See also ==
- List of bishops of the United Methodist Church
