= Edwin Charles Boulton =

American bishop

Edwin Charles Boulton (15 April 1928 – 15 May 2000) was an American bishop of the United Methodist Church, elected in 1980.

== Birth and family ==
He was born on 15 April 1928 in St. Joseph, Missouri, the son of Glenn E. and Elsa A. Person Boulton. On 17 July 1949, Edwin married Betty Ann Fisher in Lathrop, Missouri, with whom he had four children.

== Education ==
Boulton earned his A.B. degree from William Jewell College in Liberty, Missouri in 1950, and his M.Div. degree from Duke Divinity School in 1953. While attending school Edwin served churches in Lathrop, and then the Calvary Methodist Church in Durham, North Carolina.

Bishop Boulton received honorary degrees from Iowa Wesleyan College, Simpson College, Rust College, Westmar College, Mount Union College, Dakota Wesleyan University and Baldwin-Wallace College.

== Ordained ministry ==
Following his graduation from Duke he was ordained deacon and appointed to serve the West End and Vass Methodist Churches in the North Carolina Annual Conference, where he remained for three and a half years. He then became a member of the North Iowa Conference in 1956, where he was also ordained elder. Between 1954 and 1970 Edwin served these churches: Republic Community in Ionia; Pocahontas; and Asbury in Bettendorf. In 1970 he was appointed superintendent of the Dubuque District, serving three years until becoming Administrative Assistant to the Bishop of the Iowa Area, Bishop James S. Thomas. While serving in this position Edwin was one of the negotiators at the crisis at Wounded Knee.

Prior to his election to the episcopacy, Edwin was a delegate to Jurisdictional Conference in 1972, and to General Conference in 1976 and 1980. He served on the Interjurisdictional Committee on the Episcopacy, and was active in the World Methodist Council, where he served on the Evangelism, Finance, and Executive Committees.

== Episcopal ministry ==
Upon his election, Bishop Boulton was assigned to the Dakotas Episcopal Area (North and South Dakota Annual Conferences), where he served until 1988 when he was assigned to the Ohio East Area. He was president of the U.M. General Council on Finance and Administration. He had the opportunity of preaching in England, Israel, Belgium, Germany, Switzerland, Austria and Hungary.

Bishop Boulton was known as a wordsmith who phrased faith, life and relationships in refreshing clarity. One friend paid this tribute to him:

"I had a hard time calling him 'Bishop.' He laughed too much. He liked to be with children. He inhaled ice cream. He enjoyed football - watching or playing. He was an excellent storyteller. He was an attentive listener - even if he had heard it all before! He was patient with others. He was an advocate for the underdog - the dirt farmer in Iowa, the Native American in Dakota, the factory worker in Ohio. He idolized his grandchildren, admired his children, loved and adored Betty Ann. He was a good man who just happened to be Bishop - Ed Boulton."

== Retirement ==
Bishop Boulton retired from the active episcopacy in 1996. He and his wife purchased a home in the North Canton, Ohio area. He also became adjunct professor of homiletics at the Methodist Theological School in Ohio, Delaware, Ohio.

== Death and funeral ==
Having had health problems since becoming a bishop and after suffering for some months from a rare auto-immune disorder, Boulton died 15 May 2000 in Akron, Ohio. His memorial service was held 26 May 2000 in the First U.M.Church, Akron, OH. The Rev. D. Lynn Snider, Pastor, Bishop James S. Thomas, Bishop Jonathan D. Keaton, Bishop Judith Craig and the Rev. Dr. L. Mark George participated. Larry Sonner, Pastoral Care Director of the Iowa Annual Conference and one of Edwin's long-time close friends presented a sermonic tribute to him. At the time of his death, Bishop Boulton was survived by his wife; by his daughter, Lisa Boulton; by his daughter and son-in-law, Melanie and Bob Pownell; by his son, Jim Boulton; by his son and daughter-in-law, Mitch and Georga Boulton; and by his grandchildren, Breanna, Shaila and Tory Boulton. One grandson, Brennan, preceded him in death in 1993.

== See also ==
- List of bishops of the United Methodist Church

Religious titles
Preceded by James Samuel Thomas	Resident Bishop, Ohio East Area, United Methodist Church; 1988-1996	Succeeded by Jonathan D. Keaton
