= Wayne K. Clymer =

American bishop

Wayne Kenton Clymer (September 24, 1917 – November 25, 2013) was an American bishop of the United Methodist Church, elected in 1972. He also distinguished himself as a pastor in the Evangelical United Brethren Church (E.U.B.); as a Preacher and Lecturer; as a professor, Dean and President of an E.U.B./U.M. Seminary; as a Delegate to United Nations and Ecumenical church bodies; and as an author.

== Birth and family ==
Wayne was born in Napoleon, Ohio, the son of the Rev. George A. and Grace Sallie Hulvey Clymer. His father was a member of the Ohio Annual Conference of the Evangelical Church, having served several churches in that State.

== Education ==
Wayne earned his A.B. degree from Asbury College (1939), and the M.A., degree in Philosophy from Columbia University. Union Theological Seminary, New York City conferred upon him the Bachelor of Divinity degree, and he earned his PhD from New York University. He pursued post-doctoral studies at the New York School for Social Research, the William Alanson White School of Psychiatry, and Columbia University. Clinical Pastoral Education was taken at the Massachusetts General Hospital, and at St. Luke's Hospital in New York City.

== Ordained ministry ==
Wayne was ordained deacon and elder by Bishop John S. Stamm, becoming a member of the Atlantic Conference of the Evangelical Church. Rev. Clymer served pastorates in Ozone Park, New York and Forest Hills, New York.

In 1946 Dr. Clymer was appointed professor of Pastoral Care at the Evangelical Theological Seminary, Naperville, Illinois. In 1957 he was appointed Dean of the Seminary. In 1967 he became President. During a sabbatical year (1966–67), Dean Clymer served as a consultant on ministerial training to the United Church of Christ in the Philippines. He also taught at St. Andrew's Theological Seminary in Manila and Trinity College in Singapore. During his tenure in theological education, Dr. Clymer served as President of the Association of Seminary Professors, the Chicago Theological Faculties Union, and the Mid-America Theological Center.

== Episcopal ministry ==
Dr. Clymer was elected to the episcopacy in 1972 by the North Central Jurisdictional Conference of the U.M. Church. He was assigned to the Minnesota Episcopal Area, where he served two quadrennia. In 1980 he was assigned to the Iowa Area, where he served one quadrennium. As a bishop he served as the president of The United Methodist Committee on Relief, 1976–84. He was a member of the US delegation to the United Nations Conference on Refugees in Geneva, Switzerland in 1970. Upon his retirement in 1984, Bishop Clymer served as liaison for the Council of Bishops to the theological seminaries.

== Honors ==
Bishop Clymer gave the Denman Lectures at the Congress on Evangelism (1976); the Berger Lectures at the University of Dubuque (1985); the Washburn Lectures (1985); and the George Buttrick Lectures, Bayview, Michigan (1990). He was Preacher on the NBC radio series, "Art of Living" (1962); and Preacher on "The Protestant Hour" (1970). Four times he was a delegate to the Oxford Conference on Methodist Theological Studies, and represented his denomination at the Fourth World Conference on Faith and Order. Honorary degrees have been conferred upon him by Westmar College, Hamline University, Iowa Wesleyan College, Rust College, and Garrett-Evangelical Theological Seminary.

== Selected writings ==
- Affirmation, Nashville, Tidings, 1971.
- Membership Means Discipleship, Nashville, Discipleship Resources, 1976.
- "The Life and Thought of James Relly" in Church History 11:3 (Sept, 1942): 193-216. <https://doi.org/10.2307/3160633>
- "Union with Christ: The Calvinist Universalism of James Relly (1722–1778)," in All Shall be Well: Explorations in Universal Salvation and Christian Theology, from Origen to Moltmann, edited by Gregory Macdonald Cambridge: The Lutterworth Press, 2011: 116-140. <https://doi.org/10.2307/j.ctt1cg4m9c.9>
- numerous other articles

== See also ==
- List of bishops of the United Methodist Church
