= Garrett–Evangelical Theological Seminary =

Graduate school of theology in Illinois, US

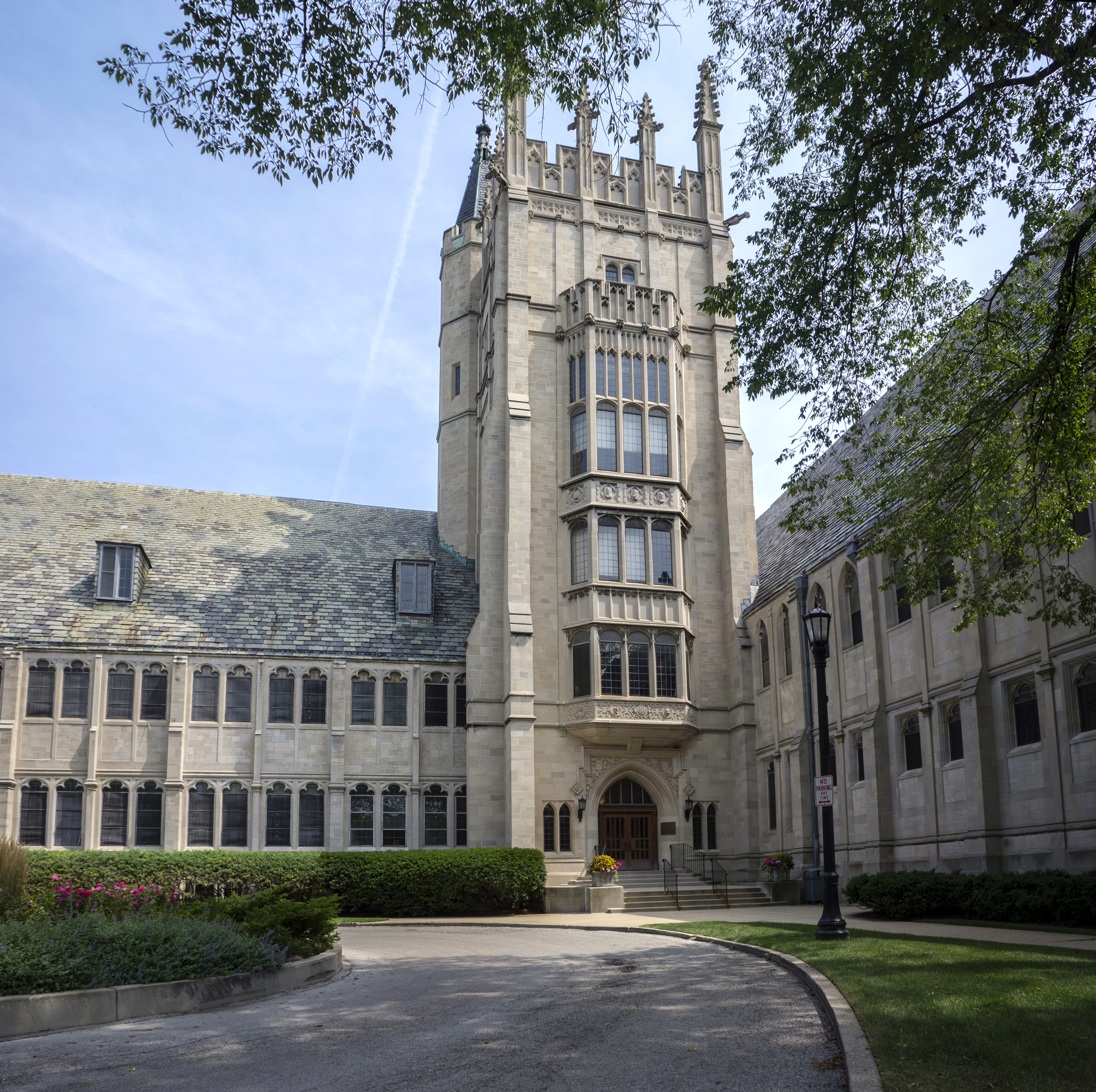
- Motto: Let there be light
- Type: Private seminary
- Established: 1853
- Religious affiliation: United Methodist Church
- Endowment: $136.9 million (2025)
- President: Javier A. Viera
- Dean: Jennifer Harvey
- Location: Evanston, Illinois, United States; 42.0562°N 87.6755°W
- Website: garrett.edu

Garrett–Evangelical Theological Seminary (Garrett) is a private seminary and graduate school of theology related to the United Methodist Church and is ecumenical in spirit. It is located in Evanston, Illinois, on the campus of Northwestern University, though it has always formally been a separate institution. The seminary offers master's- and doctoral-level degrees, as well as certificate, micro-credentialing, and lifelong learning programs. It has thousands of alumni serving in ministry, education, organizational leadership, and public service throughout the world.

== History ==
Garrett–Evangelical is the result of the interweaving of three institutions:

- Founded in 1851 and beginning operations in 1853, the school is the result of a generous gift by benefactor Eliza Clark Garrett. Garrett Biblical Institute was the first Methodist seminary in the Midwest. It was established by the same group who founded Northwestern University, and both institutions have shared a campus in Evanston since their founding days. Its founders hoped that the school would shape mind and spirit for an educated clergy, a controversial topic as many local congregations looked with suspicion upon institutions of higher learning. Both Garrett and Northwestern University were early expressions of Methodists’ deep commitment to higher learning and making that learning increasingly accessible for leaders of the church and civil society.
- The Chicago Training School, established in 1885, was a force for women in ministry and for developing social and educational service agencies throughout Chicago. Its primary mission was to train female leaders to advocate for the poorest residents of the city, many had either recently emigrated from Europe, or were from the formerly enslaved communities from southern states who made their way north as part of the Great Migration. The school also played a significant role in training missionaries for service throughout the world. The Chicago Training School merged with Garrett Biblical Institute in 1934, forming Garrett Theological Seminary.
- Evangelical Theological Seminary, located in Naperville and founded as a seminary of the Evangelical Church (later the Evangelical United Brethren) in 1873, and was originally founded to serve the needs of the growing German-speaking immigrant communities. Garrett–Evangelical was formed in 1974 when the Garrett Theological Seminary in Evanston merged with the Evangelical Theological Seminary in Naperville, Illinois (both UMC schools). The merged school occupied the Garrett campus in Evanston.

Garrett–Evangelical is on the campus of Northwestern University and continues associations with the university. Both institutions were founded by the same Methodist clergy and laity in the mid-nineteenth century. Garrett has been an institution that specializes in preparing pastoral leaders for congregational leadership, and has also been a pioneer in preparing women for ministry and public leadership.

== Partnerships ==
=== Northwestern University ===
Garrett–Evangelical and Northwestern University have a relationship that is 170 years old. Founders established both institutions to provide a learned clergy for an educated church, and learned citizenry for the rapidly growing and expanding "North West," as the Chicagoland area was then known. Over the decades, the institutions have shared resources, including courses, buildings, faculties, libraries, parking, technology, and in its earliest days a joint Board of Trustees.

=== The Association of Chicago Theological Schools ===
The Chicago area boasts the greatest concentration of seminaries per capita of anywhere in the U.S. The Chicago area schools are organized into a cluster called The Association of Chicago Theological Schools. Garrett–Evangelical is one of the 11 member schools. The ACTS website states:

Together, the schools within ACTS offer a rich network of resources for theological education, making the association one of the outstanding centers of theological education in the world. Available to the approximately 3,000 students currently enrolled at its member schools is a faculty of more than 350, more than 1,000 courses offered annually, and library collections of 1.7 million volumes and nearly 5,000 currently received periodical subscriptions.

== Academic Centers and Institutes ==
=== Center for the Church and the Black Experience ===
The oldest of Garrett's academic centers, it focuses on research, teaching, scholarship, leadership development, activism, spirituality, and the cultural impact and liturgical life of the black church, as well as centers the life, work and voices of black scholars, pastors and preachers, movement leaders, musicians, writers, poets, and artists.

=== Stead Center for Ethics and Values ===
Founded through the generosity of Mary Joy and Jerre L. Stead, the center draws together seminary resources, graduate professional schools, area religious leaders, and laity to address the compelling ethical issues facing contemporary society. The center engages in teaching and research on ethics and values by creating spaces for conversation, dialogues, and developing resources that enhance moral communities.

=== Ruben P. Job Institute for Spirituality and Spiritual Formation ===
Established in 2012, the Rueben P. Job Institute for Spirituality and Spiritual Formation seeks to resource laity and clergy, as well as advance research and training in the fields of Spirituality and Spiritual Formation. Named in honor of a figure in the field of Christian spiritual formation, Bishop Rueben P. Job, a Garrett–Evangelical alumnus.

=== Center for Asian/Asian American Ministry ===
The CAAM focuses its efforts on creating community for and among Asian descent students, while also centering Asian descent scholarship in the academic life of the seminary. The center also engages in support of ministries with communities of Asian descent in the Chicagoland area and beyond.

=== Styberg Preaching Institute ===
Named for its benefactors, Ernest and Bernice Styberg, the institute is a research center in homiletics focused on improving and strengthening the art and practice of preaching. It accomplishes this work through research initiatives, workshops, and conferences.

=== Hispanic-Latinx Center ===
The center provides resources and academic dialogues on critical issues for Hispanic-Latinx churches and communities addressing theological and practical aspects of ministry in cross-cultural contexts.

=== Center for Ecological Regeneration ===
The Center for Ecological Regeneration provides opportunities for eco-theological research, education and formation.

== Notable alumni ==
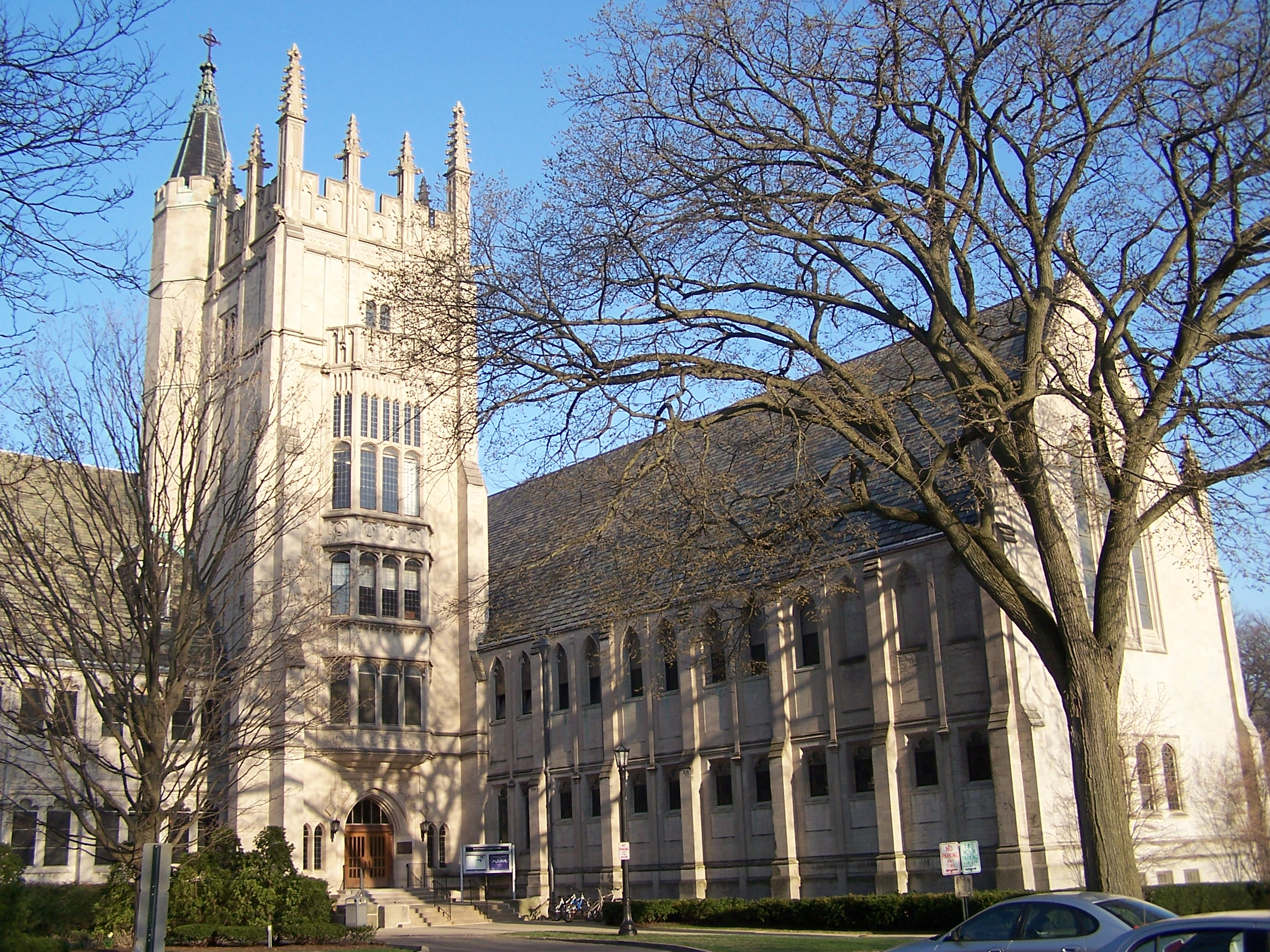
Garrett–Evangelical Theological Seminary

- Edsel Albert Ammons (B.D., 1956) – a bishop of the United Methodist Church
- Hobart Baumann Amstutz (B.D.) – a bishop of The Methodist Church
- James Hal Cone (M.Div. and Ph.D.) – father of Black Liberation Theology
- Shay Craig, bishop
- Don Wendell Holter (B.D., 1930) – a bishop of the United Methodist Church
- Bruce Johnson – a Methodist minister who worked closely with the Young Lords in Chicago
- Jonathan D. Keaton (M.Div., 1971; S.T.D., 1979) – a bishop of the United Methodist Church
- David J. Lawson (B.D., 1959) – a bishop of the United Methodist Church
- George McGovern (No degree, 1946) – historian, politician, and 1972 Democratic presidential candidate
- J. Gordon Melton (M.Div., 1968) – a research specialist in religion and New Religious Movements
- Smokie Norful (attended) – American gospel singer and pianist who won a Grammy at the 47th Annual Grammy Awards for Best Contemporary Soul Gospel Album in 2004
- Lloyd John Ogilvie (M.Theology) – Presbyterian minister, author, and former Chaplain of the United States Senate
- Bruce R. Ough (M.Div., 1978) – a bishop of the United Methodist Church
- Henry C. Schadeberg (B.D., 1941) – politician
- Lyle E. Schaller (B.D., 1957) – church consultant, church growth leader
- John S. Stamm (graduate of Evangelical Theological Seminary-Naperville, Illinois [E.T.S.]) – bishop of the Evangelical Church
- John McKendree Springer (B.D. from Garrett Biblical Institute, 1901) – pioneering Methodist missionary in Africa and bishop
- Emilie Townes (Ph.D. 1989) womanist theologian and dean of Vanderbilt University Divinity School
- Elmer Towns (M.R.E. from Garrett Theological Seminary) – co-founder of Liberty University
- James Zwerg – a Freedom Rider before attending seminary

== Former and current faculty ==
- Edsel Albert Ammons – professor, 1968–1976
- Ernest T. Campbell – Presbyterian Church (USA) pastor; former Senior Pastor at Riverside Church NYC; professor of homiletics, 1982–1989
- Wayne K. Clymer – professor of Pastoral Care, 1946–1957; dean, 1957–1967; president, 1967–1972 (all at Evangelical Theological Seminary, Naperville, Illinois); bishop of the United Methodist Church (1972–)
- Georgia Harkness
- Don Wendell Holter – professor of church history and missions (1949–1958); then founding president of St. Paul School of Theology
- Jonathan D. Keaton – graduate teaching assistant in communications, ethics and society, and church and the Black experience (1970s at Garrett and Garrett–Evangelical)
- Daniel Parish Kidder – professor of homiletics. Editor, and author of Mormonism and the Mormons (1844), Sketches of Residence and Travel in Brazil (1845), The Fratricide "Reminiscences of The West India Islands: (1851), Treatise on Homiletics (1864, 1884), The Christian Pastorate (1871); He also edited THE SUNDAY-SCHOLAR'S MIRROR: A Monthly Magazine for Children (1850–1854)
- Helmer Ringgren
- Rosemary Radford Ruether – Roman Catholic feminist scholar
- John S. Stamm – professor of systematic theology at E.T.S. (1919–1926)
- K. K. Yeo – Harry R. Kendall Professor of New Testament, 1996–
