= Brashares =

Brashares is a surname. Notable people with the surname include:

- Ann Brashares (born 1967), American writer
- Charles Wesley Brashares (1891–1982), American Methodist bishop
