= John Ellington =

John Ellington may refer to:

- John B. Ellington Jr., former general in the Air National Guard
- John J. Ellington (born 1960), American associate justice of the Supreme Court of Georgia
