= Edsel Albert Ammons =

American bishop

Edsel Albert Ammons (February 17, 1924 – December 24, 2010) was an American bishop of the United Methodist Church, elected in 1976.

== Early life and education ==
Ammons was born on February 17, 1924, in Chicago, Illinois. He was the son of boogie woogie legend Albert Ammons. Bishop Ammons was married to Helen Ammons, the former Director of Student Life at Garrett-Evangelical Theological Seminary, Evanston, Illinois.

He was a graduate of Roosevelt University, Chicago, Illinois (B.A., 1948). He earned his Bachelor of Divinity degree from Garrett-Evangelical Theological Seminary, Evanston, Illinois (1956), and his D.Min. from Chicago Theological Seminary (1975).

== Early ministry ==
Ammons was ordained, both deacon and elder, in the African Methodist Episcopal Church (1947 and 1949), pastoring churches of that denomination in Chicago and in Highland Falls, New York. Edsel was a social case worker for the Department of Welfare of Cook County, Illinois (1951–56).

In 1957, under the influence of Bishop Charles Wesley Brashares, Ammons transferred into the Rock River Annual Conference of the United Methodist Church, and was appointed to the Whitfield Methodist Church in Chicago (which became the Ingleside-Whitfield Methodist Parish). He served this church until 1963, when he became director of urban ministry for the Rockford District. In 1966, he was appointed to the program staff of the Annual Conference.

Ammons joined the faculty of Garrett Theological Seminary in 1968, remaining in this position until elected to the episcopacy in 1976.

== Episcopal ministry ==
Ammons was elected by the North Central Jurisdictional Conference and assigned to the Michigan Episcopal Area (the Detroit and West Michigan Annual Conferences). After eight years in Michigan, he was assigned to the Ohio West Area (the West Ohio Conference). He also served as the president of the U.M. General Board of Discipleship (1980–84), the chairperson of the Health and Welfare Program Department (1984–88), and chairperson of the Missionary Personnel and Resources Program Department (1988–92) of the General Board of Global Ministries.

Ammons received honorary degrees from Westmar College (1975), Albion College (1979), Adrian College (1980), Mount Union College (1992) and Chicago Theological Seminary (1992). In retirement Bishop Ammons served as bishop-in-residence at Garrett-Evangelical.

Ammons died on December 24, 2010, in Evanston, Illinois, at age 86.

== Personal life ==
in 1951 Ammons married June Billingsley and they had six children: Marilyn, Edsel, Jr., Carol, Kenneth, Carlton, and jazz singer Lila.

== See also ==
- List of bishops of the United Methodist Church
