= Hae Jong Kim =

Korean-American bishop (1935–2020)

- Hangul: 김해종
- RR: Gim Haejong
- MR: Kim Haejong

Hae Jong Kim (Korean: 김해종; 1935–2020) was a Korean-American bishop of the United Methodist Church, elected in 1992, who resigned as a bishop in 2005.

== Early life ==
Kim was born in Seoul, Korea in 1935. During the Korean War he became a Christian. Then, while working for a United States Marine Corps Chaplain as an interpreter, translating sermons before Korean audiences, he decided to enter into ministry. He was 17 years old.

== Education ==
Kim went to the Methodist Theological Seminary in Seoul, and upon completing study there came to the United States to pursue further education. He graduated in 1964 with an M.Div. degree from the Methodist Theological School in Ohio. He continued graduate study at Drew Theological Seminary.

== Ordained ministry ==
He also began pastoral ministry in 1964, serving various types of churches in the Northern New Jersey Annual Conference of the Methodist Church, including a Korean church he founded. Kim was instrumental in developing Korean ministry strategies in the conference and helped develop some 15 Korean American U.M. churches in New Jersey.

During the next several years, as Korean immigration to the U.S. began to swell, Kim worked for the Annual Conference and for U.M. agencies as a bridge person, helping to bring understanding about the Korean community. He has been an advocate for ethnic minority causes, having strong links to the Korean community and to the Methodist Church of Korea.

Kim went on to serve as the Chairperson of the Conference Council on Ministries and has provided leadership at the annual and general church levels. Prior to his election to the episcopacy, he was a delegate to General Conferences (1980–92), as well as a director of the U.M. General Board of Global Ministries (1980–99). During these years he had an important role in developing national and jurisdictional mission structures to facilitate Korean American ministries and congregations. In the Korean community he was recognized as a leader by his election as President of the National Association of Korean American U.M. Churches, and President of the Council of Korean Churches of Greater New York. He worked with the Northeastern Jurisdiction Multi-Ethnic Center: on the Charter Committee and then as a member of the Board of Directors, serving as President (1988–92).

Kim earned the D.Min. degree from Drew Theological Seminary in 1984. That same year he was appointed a district superintendent in the Northern New Jersey Conference, the first Korean American to hold this position in the entire United Methodist Church. Following this, he was appointed pastor of a church in Basking Ridge, New Jersey, from which he was elected a bishop in July 1992. He served the New York West Episcopal Area from 1992 to 2000, and in 2000 became bishop of the Pittsburgh Area. He retired in 2004.

In January 2005, a disciplinary complaint was brought against Bishop Kim. The details of the charges were handled in accordance with confidentiality requirements of the United Methodist Book of Discipline and were not disclosed. However, on August 30, 2005, Bishop Peter D. Weaver, then president of the United Methodist Council of Bishops, announced the resignation of Bishop Kim as a part of the resolution process. The resignation was to be effective September 1, 2005. Though he resigned from the United Methodist episcopacy, he retained his clergy credentials.

In July 2008 he became the pastor of a very small United Methodist church.

Bishop Kim liked to write poems. He translated many Korean hymns into English, two of which are in the United Methdodist Hymnal: Lonely the Boat and Mountains are All Aglow. He has written other hymns in English.

== Personal life ==
Kim was married to Wha-Sei Park Kim (박화세). They had three children: Eugene (김유진), Eusun (김유선), and Eumi (김유미). He died on November 3, 2020, in Fort Lee, New Jersey.

== Selected writings ==
- Ten Ideas for Evangelism and Church Growth
- Korean-American Ministries
- Class Meeting for Church Growth
- Becoming Disciples (in Korean)

== See also ==
- List of bishops of the United Methodist Church
