= K. K. Yeo =

Malaysian-born U.S. Chinese scholar of the New Testament

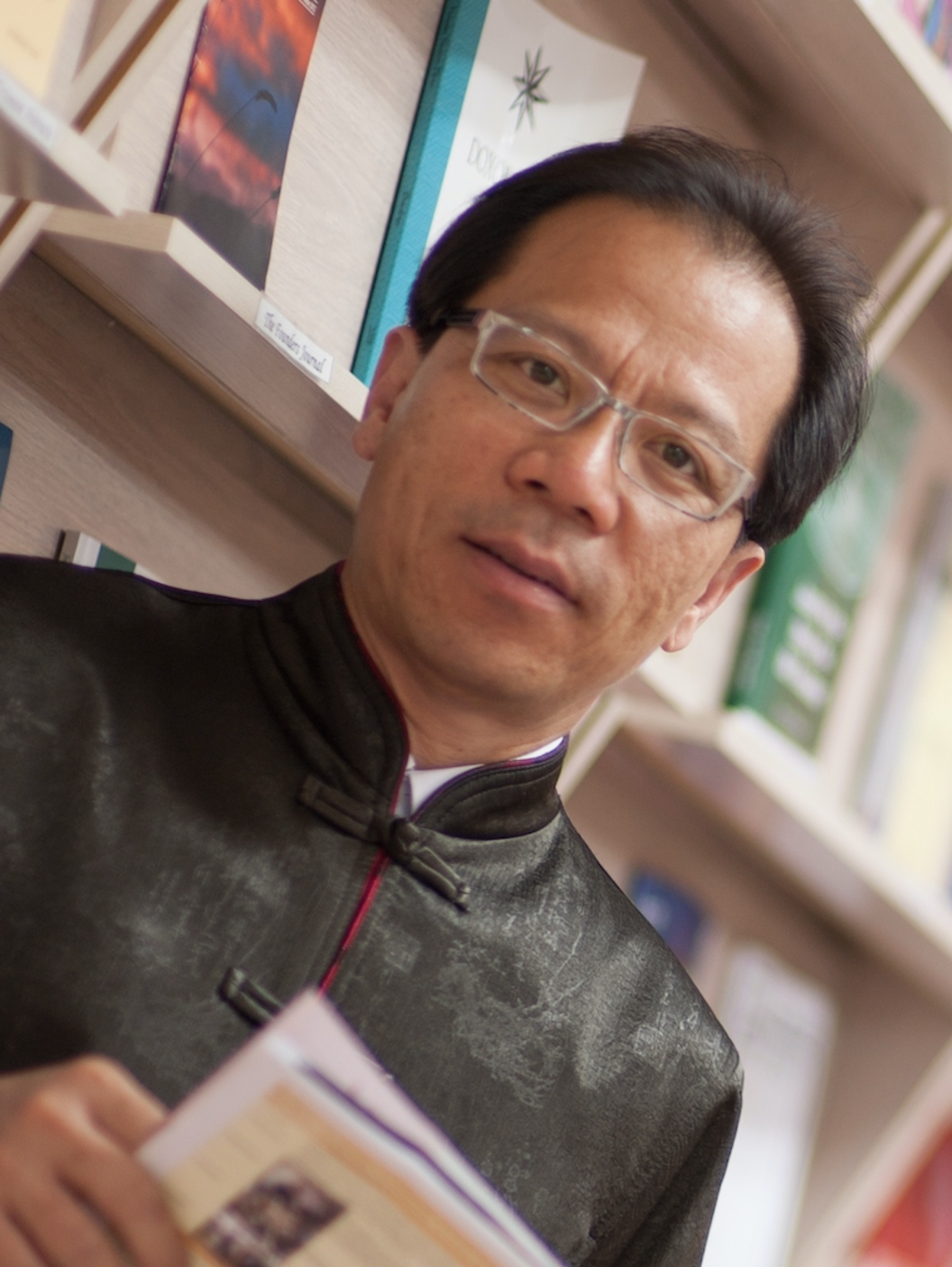
- Born: 1960 (age 65–66); Borneo Malaysia
- Occupation: New Testament scholar
- Known for: Cross-cultural hermeneutics

Academic background
- Education: Northwestern University, Garrett–Evangelical Theological Seminary, St. Paul Bible College

K. K. Yeo
- Traditional Chinese: 楊克勤
- Simplified Chinese: 杨克勤
Transcriptions
Standard Mandarin
- Hanyu Pinyin: Yang Keqin

K. K. Yeo or YEO Khiok-Khng (simplified Chinese: 杨克勤; traditional Chinese: 楊克勤; pinyin: Yang Keqin, born 1960), is a Malaysian-born U.S. Chinese scholar of the New Testament. He is known for his work in cross-cultural hermeneutics, public and global theologies.

== Biography ==
Yeo was born and raised in a small coastal village called Kampong Teriso in Borneo Sarawak (three years before Sarawak joined the federation of Malaysia on 16 September 1963). He is married to Kungsiu. He identifies his background as “a diasporic Chinese, a hybrid Christian Chinese identity” in multi-cultural Malaysia that shapes his interests in the critical engagement between the Bible and cultures.

Yeo completed a BA in Biblical and Theological Studies from St. Paul Bible College in 1987 (mentorship of Donald Alexander), an MDiv from Garrett-Evangelical Theological Seminary in 1990, and a PhD in New Testament, Classical and Rhetorical Studies at Northwestern University under the mentorship of Robert L. Jewett (2013–2020), Reginald E. Allen (1931–2007), and Michael Leff (1941–2010) in 1992.

== Career: Theologian, educator, academic ==
Teaching and mentoring

Yeo was a professor of New Testament at Alliance Bible Seminary in Hong Kong from 1992 to 1996, before becoming Harry R. Kendall Professor of New Testament at Garrett-Evangelical Theological Seminary, where he has taught since July 1996. He also served on the graduate school faculty of Northwestern University, Evanston (1997–2008) for the joint Garrett-Northwestern PhD program.

Yeo is an affiliate faculty member at the Department of Asian Languages and Cultures at Northwestern University Evanston (since 2015), and a Distinguished Visiting professor at Zhejiang University, Hangzhou, China (since 2012), a visiting professor of Peking University, Peking Normal University, and Fudan University in China (since 2006). He currently serves as one of the international consultants at Christian Art Center, Peking Normal University, Beijing (since 2015); a dissertation mentor of the PhD and MTh programs at Australian College of Theology (since 2018). He was the academic director of the International Leadership Group (ILG) at Peking University (2005–2016), directing the MA in Christian Studies and PhD in Biblical Studies programs, matriculating almost one thousand graduates at Peking University.

Research and cross-cultural hermeneutics

Inducted as an elected member of Studiorum Novi Testamenti Societas (SNTS: Society of New Testament Studies) in 1999, Yeo is also a full member of the Society of Biblical Literature (since 1987) and the Chicago Society of Biblical Research (since 1996). He has served numerous societies, journals, and institutions as an academic committee member, research fellow, and advisory consultant.

Yeo is best known for his work advocating for cross-cultural biblical hermeneutics, as found in his dissertation, later published as Rhetorical Interaction in 1 Corinthians 8 and 10: A Formal Analysis with Implications for a Cross-Cultural, Chinese Hermeneutic and his second English book, What Has Jerusalem to Do with Beijing: Biblical Interpretation from a Chinese Perspective. His approach includes the comparison and contrast of biblical and Chinese classical texts, in order to look for similar and unique themes or events as points of mutual critical engagement—"reading the Bible culturally and reading classical cultural texts biblically.” See also his Musing with Confucius and Paul and Zhuangzi and James(Chinese edition published in 2012 in Shanghai).

Collaboration and majority world theologies

Early in his career in 1994, Yeo and Philip P. Chia co-founded a Chinese-English peer-reviewed theological journal, Jian Dao: A Journal of Bible and Theology, and its two series: the Jian Dao Dissertation Series; Bible and Hermeneutic series.

Along with Gene L. Green and Stephen T. Pardue, Yeo is also a series editor of the six-volume "Majority World Theology" series, published by Langham Publishing, and republished in omnibus edition through IVP Academic, which offers examples of six theological loci (Christology, Trinity, pneumatology, ecclesiology, soteriology, and eschatology) explored from a variety of global perspectives.

Together with Gene L. Green, Yeo co-edits the "Crosscurrents in Majority World and Minority Theology" series published by Cascade Books, which offers theological loci such as land, migration, identity, which are prominent in the majority world but often find no place in North Atlantic discussions.

Yeo also co-edits with Melanie Baffes the "Contrapuntal Readings of the Bible in World Christianity" series, published by Pickwick Publications, which celebrates biblical interpretations that engage in contextual theology while taking part in the polyphonic conversation that is global Christianity.

Yeo has edited The Oxford Handbook of the Bible in China (900+ pages and 43 images), as he collaborated with 48 authors writing 47 chapters on the translation, expression, interpretation, and reception of the Bible in China.

Community of Christian scholars and world Christianity

Yeo's recent works have a special emphasis on the tasks of building nations, transforming local communities, fulfilling the ideals of culture, saving individuals from chaos, meaninglessness, injustice, and moving them toward shalom and beauty.

Since 2020 Yeo serves as the vice-president of Global Faculty Initiative (GFI) (Terence C. Halliday serves as the President and, together with Donald Hay, co-convenors) “to promote the integration of Christian faith and academic disciplines by bringing theologians into conversation with scholars across the spectrum of faculties in research universities worldwide.” GFI launches a book/ebook series, Cross-Disciplinary Encounters with Theology, under the Global Library imprint of Langham Publishing. And the first title was published in January 2025: “Justice and Rights: Nicholas Wolterstorff in Dialogue with the University” (co-edited by Halliday and Yeo).
