= Judith Craig =

American bishop

Judith Craig (June 5, 1937 − January 18, 2019) was an American bishop of the United Methodist Church.

== Family and education ==
Born on June 5, 1937 in Lexington, Missouri, Craig obtained a Bachelor of Arts degree from William Jewell College in Liberty, Missouri, followed by a Master of Divinity degree from Eden Theological Seminary in Webster Groves, Missouri, in 1961, and an Master of Arts degree in Christian education from Union Theological Seminary in New York City, in 1968.

Her niece, Shay Craig, is currently the Bishop of North Dakota in the Episcopal Church of America.

== Career ==
Craig was ordained as a minister in the United Methodist Church at the East Ohio Annual Conference, becoming a deacon in 1972 and an elder in 1974. Both ordinations were conducted by Bishop Francis Enmer Kearns. She was in charge of religious education at Epworth-Euclid United Methodist Church in Cleveland, Ohio from 1972 to 1976, and was pastor of Pleasant Hills United Methodist Church, also in Cleveland, from 1976 to 1980. In 1980 she was appointed director of the East Ohio Conference Council on Ministries.

Craig was elected as a delegate to the 1980 and 1984 General and North Central Jurisdictional Conferences of the United Methodist Church, and in 1980 served as the secretary of the Legislative Committee on Higher Education and Ministry of the General Conference.

The North Central Jurisdictional Conference elected Craig as a bishop in 1984. She was assigned to the Michigan area from 1984 to 1992 and the Ohio West area from 1992 to 2000. In 1996 she was selected to deliver the episcopal address at the General Conference of the United Methodist Council of Bishops.

As a bishop, Craig served on the United Methodist General Commission on the Status and Role of Women (1984−1988), the United Methodist General Council on Ministries (1988−1992) and the General Board of Publication.

== Retirement and death ==
In retirement, Craig served as bishop-in-residence and visiting professor of leadership at the Methodist Theological School in Ohio. She was the editor for The Leading Women: Stories of the First Women Bishops of the United Methodist Church (2004).

She died on January 18, 2019 at the age of 77.

== Honors ==
Craig received honorary Doctorates of Humane Letters from Baldwin-Wallace College in 1979 and Adrian College in 1985, as well as Doctor of Divinity degrees in 1994 from both Otterbein College and Lebanon Valley College.
