= Elizabeth Clark (author) =

English story-teller and lecturer

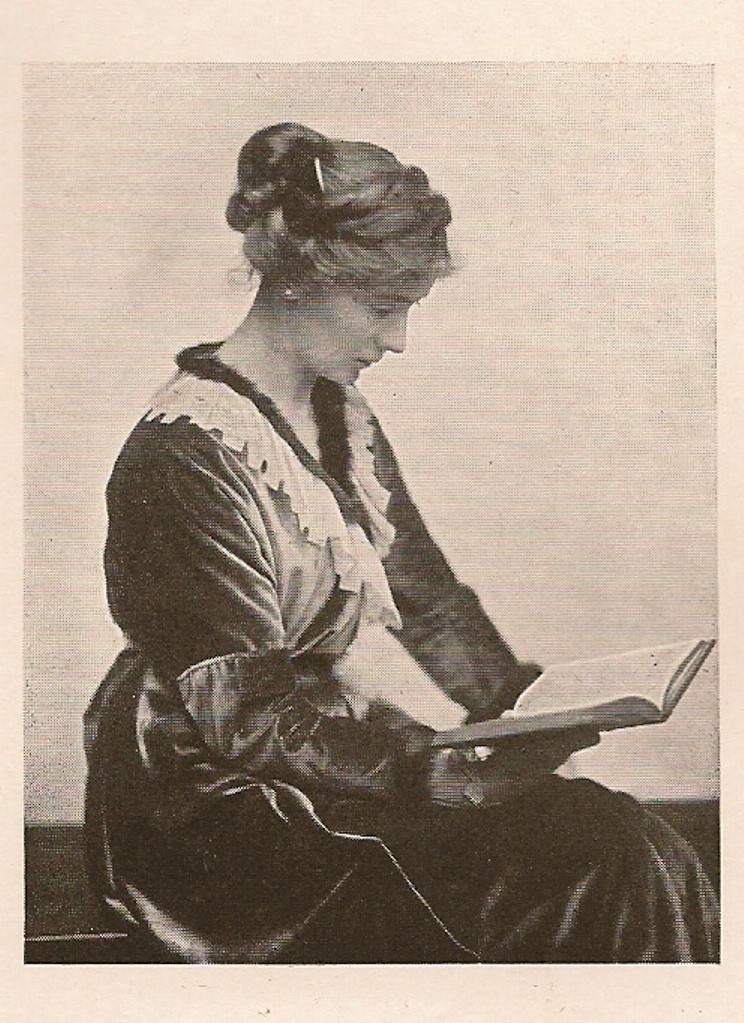
- Elizabeth Clark, about 1915
- Born: 14 May 1875; Hartlebury, Worcestershire, United Kingdom
- Died: 21 April 1972 (aged 96); Winchester, Hampshire, United Kingdom
- Resting place: Kilmeston, Hampshire, United Kingdom
- Occupations: Story teller, lecturer, author
- Years active: 1915–1955

Annette Elizabeth Clark (14 May 1875 – 21 April 1972) who was known to her family as Nettie, was a story-teller of children's stories, a lecturer in the craft of storytelling and the author of ten collections of children's stories published during her lifetime. Her stories were broadcast on the BBC children's programmes.

== Early life ==
Elizabeth Clark was born in 1875 the eldest of six children to Reverend William Maitland Clark and Annette Laura Clark in Hartlebury where her father was headmaster of Hartlebury Grammar School. Four years later the family moved to another school in Hampstead and then, in about 1883, to Kingsgate House in Winchester to establish a boys' preparatory school. They lived at Kingsgate House until 1904 when it was sold to Winchester College. While at Kingsgate House Elizabeth Clark and her sisters were some of the earliest pupils at the (then) Winchester High School for Girls (now St Swithun's).

Her father subsequently became vicar of Kilmeston, 8 miles (13 km) east of Winchester. As the eldest daughter in a Victorian/Edwardian vicarage, she was expected to assist her parents in the life of the parish. She gradually became aware of her latent gift as a storyteller as she began to capture the interest of the village children by telling them fairy stories. She became determined to make storytelling her life's work and left home to live in London.

In 1915 she was invited to give regular Story-hours at the then newly formed Play-Centres. The following year she gave a course of lectures at the West Ham and District Education Centre. The photograph above is taken from a promotional pamphlet she put out which quoted favourable press reviews, including an article that appeared in the Evening Standard:

Miss Elizabeth Clark is an idealist. Her stories are related with a sympathetic understanding of what a child wants to know ... She can carry the children with her not only into the well-known world of Grimm and Anderson but along routes of old saga for which East and West are alike responsible.

== After the First World War ==
In 1919 the London County Council appointed her to give a course of lectures to London teachers which she continued to give twice a year for more than ten years. Meanwhile, she was lecturing to an increasing number of students in the University Training Centres in Scotland. In 1931 she was invited by the Executive of the National Girl Scouts of the USA to lecture at their conferences in the East and Mid-West. After a tour of two months, she returned to England following which she gave a talk at a Luncheon Club in Hull on storytelling in America. The following appeared the Hull Daily Mail:

As I write I cannot help still thinking of the delightful way of story-telling which is possessed by Miss Elizabeth Clark, who spoke at the Women's Luncheon Club, Hull, on the art of story-telling in America. I remembered her as soon as she began, and the fact that she had been to the Luncheon Club before, and had enchanted me especially with the tale of a hungry family finding a cabbage in their garden which grew and grew until they had enough to make a good meal and soup for the whole family even giving the "Little Moose a cup o' soup", to use the wording of a child to whom she had previously told it.

She really is a refreshing person, and makes one feel young again as well as becoming extremely envious of her art. I think, too, she makes our next feeble attempt at story-telling easier, because she makes you realise that to understand a story people must really “see” in their mind the objects spoken of. She always gives a vivid picture, and you have no doubt as to what the people in the story are like, what the surroundings look like.

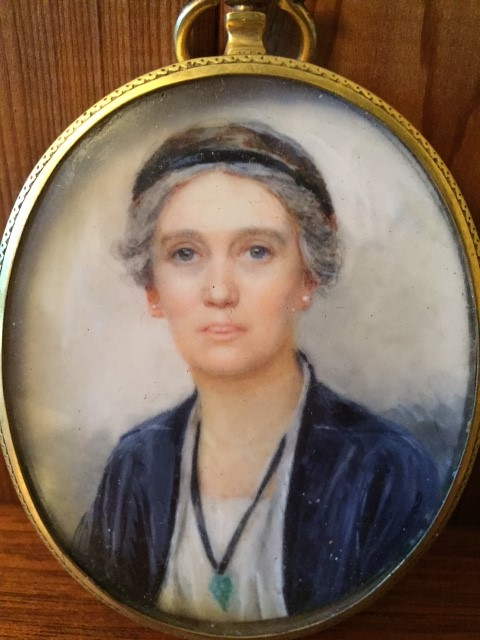
Miniature painting by Elizabeth Clark's sister (Frances Irene Donaldson). Date unknown

Her 1933 publication Twenty Tales for Telling was dedicated to the Girl Scouts of the USA and includes a story Jack-in-the-Pulpit based on her experiences in New England. Alexander Haddow wrote in a review of this collection about Elizabeth Clark's power of telling stories:

Those who have heard her tell a story know what a perfect artist she is, how she lives her part, what perfect command of her voice and what a gift of expression she has.

He had heard her speak and wondered how a girl of eight would react to the printed text. Having read them all, the girl to whom he gave the book pronounced them all well, leaving the reviewer with the strong impression that Miss Clark's charm had come through in print.

There's a sweetness in her English and a simplicity both in vocabulary and construction that make it particularly suitable for children.

She lived in the Notting Hill area of London during the inter war years, returning to Winchester before the second world war where she lived with her sister Dorothy who taught Mathematics at St. Swithun's. She continued to lecture regularly and widely in England and Scotland.

Elizabeth Clark's stories were broadcast on the BBC children's programme Children's Corner between 1924 and 1926 sometimes told by others sometimes told by her. Similarly, her stories could be heard during the war years between 1940-1944 and later from 1961-1965 on Children's Hour. Some were subsequently told on the BBC's TV Jackanory programme in 1979.

In 1951 she wrote to the Director of Studies, Mr Hardie, for the Training of Teachers at the Training College in Aberdeen explaining she would find it difficult to continue her regular visits there. However, she continued to tell stories nearer home. She died in Winchester in April 1972 and is buried at Kilmeston.

In 1995 Winchester City Council included in a citywide literary festival an exhibition entitled Hampshire Daughters. This featured three women writers with Winchester connections: Jane Austen, Charlotte Mary Yonge and Elizabeth Clark who were born approximately 50 years apart.

== Technique and sources ==
For the material for her stories, she drew upon folklore worldwide, from history, legend and the Bible. Stories to Tell and How to Tell Them, More Stories and how to Tell Them and The Tale that had no Ending each have an introduction on the art of storytelling and following each story some comments about, for example, its origin and tips on how to tell or read it.

For the tales from legend, she explains where she found the tale and how and why she adapted it. In The Old Woman and the Pixies and the Tulips she 'builds' the little white house in detail, its garden and all its flowers until the scene stands clear and the action can begin. In her notes she urges setting the scene slowly and without hurry for the listeners to be able to place themselves in context. "...unless listeners have a perfect idea of the "geography" of the story, they will not be able to grasp the situation as they should". There is often a moral as in the Norse folk-tale Jonathan John and his Wife, but earlier versions she felt had been brief and concentrated too much on the quarrel between man and wife, and a bias against Jonathan which she sought to rebalance. Others like the Old Woman who Lived in a Vinegar Bottle and Good Luck and Mrs Featherfuss each have a lesson too, but after finishing it the reader, young or old, is left to decide for themselves what that lesson is.

In her telling of Bible stories, as in A Little Book of Bible Stories, included stories such as that of Moses and Miriam and The Little Ark of Rushes. Other legendary stories were set in the Middle East, Japan, India and Russia.

She often drew on her own experiences as in for example the Elizabeth Ann Stories about her own childhood in which things happen to, or are made to happen by, Elizabeth Ann and her sister Ruth Mabel (her younger sister in real life). Many of her stories were initially published in the periodical Child Education. For example, between January 1944 and December 1946 she published seven short stories about a little girl called Polly and her great-grandmother. These were later included in Sunshine Tales for Rainy Days. One of her original stories (as opposed to retold legends) Father Christmas and the Donkey, which was first published in 1942 as The Donkey that Helped Father Christmas, was written following the London blitz in World War II and for children evacuated as a result. The boys in the original story were evacuees from the blitz.

Clark's love of animals shines through her collections. Sometimes it is the interactions amongst animals alone as in Father Sparrow's Tug of War. Sometimes humans' relationships and interdependence with animals is the key to the story as in (albeit very briefly) Robin Redbreast's Thanksgiving not forgetting of course Father Christmas and the Donkey.

== Publications ==
Clark wrote over a hundred stories by the end of her life. The majority of these appear in her published collections:

Stories to tell and How to Tell Them	University of London Press, 1927
Practical Infant Teacher	Isaac Pitman & Sons, 1928
More Stories and How to Tell Them	University of London Press, 1928
The Tale that had no Ending and Other Stories	University of London Press, 1929
Twenty Tales for Telling	University of London Press, 1933
Standard Bearers	University of London Press, 1934
Tales for Jack and Jane	University of London Press, 1936
The Elizabeth Clark Story Books (4 booklets)	University of London Press, 1936
A Little Book of Bible Stories	University of London Press, 1938
Tell Me a Tale	University of London Press, 1938
Twilight and Fireside	University of London Press, 1942
Sunshine Tales for Rainy Days	University of London Press, 1948
Elizabeth Clark Plays; Adapted by Gladys Cooper from stories by Elizabeth Clark	University of London Press, 1953

Some stories have been republished since her death:

Stories to Tell	Brockhampton Press, 1974
Audiotape: Stories from Stories to Tell; Read by Anna Ford	Hodder & Stoughton, Times Newspapers Ltd, Ivan Berg Associates, 1978
Country Tales to Tell	Hodder & Stoughton, 1978
Tales for All Seasons	Hodder & Stoughton, 1986
Country Tales	Hodder Children’s Books, 1996
Father Christmas and the Donkey; Illustrated by Jan Ormerod	Penguin Books, 1993; Translated into German, Italian, Swedish and Japanese
Elizabeth Clark Story Books Vols I and II	Pikku Publishing, 2015
Elizabeth Clark Story Books Vols III and IV	Pikku Publishing, 2016
Das Eselchen und der Weihnachtsmann	Coppenrath Verlag, 2016
Das Eselchen und der Weihnachtsmann text only in collection Tierisch tolle Weihnachten	Coppenrath Verlag, 2016
Elizabeth Clark's Christmas Stories	Pikku Publishing, 2017
Das Eselchen und der Weihnachtsmann text only in collection Frohe Weihnacht	Coppenrath Verlag, 2017 and 2018
