= Jonathan D. Keaton =

American bishop

Jonathan Doyle Keaton (born March 30, 1946) is an American bishop of the United Methodist Church, elected in 1996.

== Birth and family ==
He is married to Beverly L. Keaton. They have three grown children: Jonathan Doyle Keaton, II, Tandreka Keaton, and Anaya Keaton; and two grandchildren: Maliah Keaton, and Amara Keaton.

== Education ==
Keaton earned the B.S. degree in biology at Philander Smith College, Little Rock, Arkansas (1968), the M.Div. degree at Garrett Theological Seminary, Evanston, Illinois (1971), and the S.T.D. in Homiletics and the Sociology of Religion at Garrett-Evangelical Theological Seminary (G-ETS, 1979). He also served graduate teaching assistantships in communications, ethics and society, and church and the black experience while at G-ETS. He was awarded the U.M. Crusade Scholarship in academics, 1976-78.

== Ministry ==
Prior to his election to the episcopacy, Keaton served in the Northern Illinois Annual Conference (NIC) of the U.M. Church. He was the pastor of St. Luke U.M.C., Chicago (1970–79) and of Broadway U.M.C., Rockford, Illinois (1979 - September 1982). He served as Associate Council Director of the NIC (October 1982 to 30 June 1990), where his responsibilities included Church and Society, Ethnic Minority Local Churches (Native American, Asian, Hispanic, and Black), and Spiritual formation. He was appointed superintendent of the Aurora District of the NIC (1 July 1990 to 31 August 1996). Upon his election, Keaton was assigned to the Ohio East episcopal area (1 September 1996 to 31 August 2004). He was subsequently assigned to the Michigan Area until 2012, and the Illinois Great Rivers Conference until his retirement in 2016.

== Denominational responsibilities ==
Keaton has served as a member of the U.M. General Board of Global Ministries, as the president of the U.M. Development Fund, and as the chairperson of Strengthening the Black Church in the 21st Century. Prior to his election as a bishop, he served on the U.M. General Council on Ministries (1988–96), the Advance Committee for Christ and His Church (1988–92), and the Division on Conferences and Connectional Issues of National Black Methodists for Church Renewal. He was elected to Jurisdictional and General Conferences 1988-96. He has traveled extensively in support of the U.M. Church, including Mexico, Africa, the Philippines, Europe, and Israel. He is much in demand as a preacher at national leadership events, for annual conferences, as commencement speaker at colleges and seminaries, and in other settings.

== See also ==
- List of bishops of the United Methodist Church

Religious titles
Preceded by Gregory V. Palmer	Resident Bishop, Illinois Great Rivers Conference, United Methodist Church; 2012-2016	Succeeded by Frank J. Beard
Preceded by Linda Lee	Resident Bishop, Michigan Area episcopal area, United Methodist Church; 2004-2012	Succeeded by Deborah Lieder Kiesey
Preceded by Edwin Charles Boulton	Resident Bishop, Ohio East Area, United Methodist Church; 1996-2004	Succeeded by John L. Hopkins
