= Lime Ridge, Wisconsin =

- Village
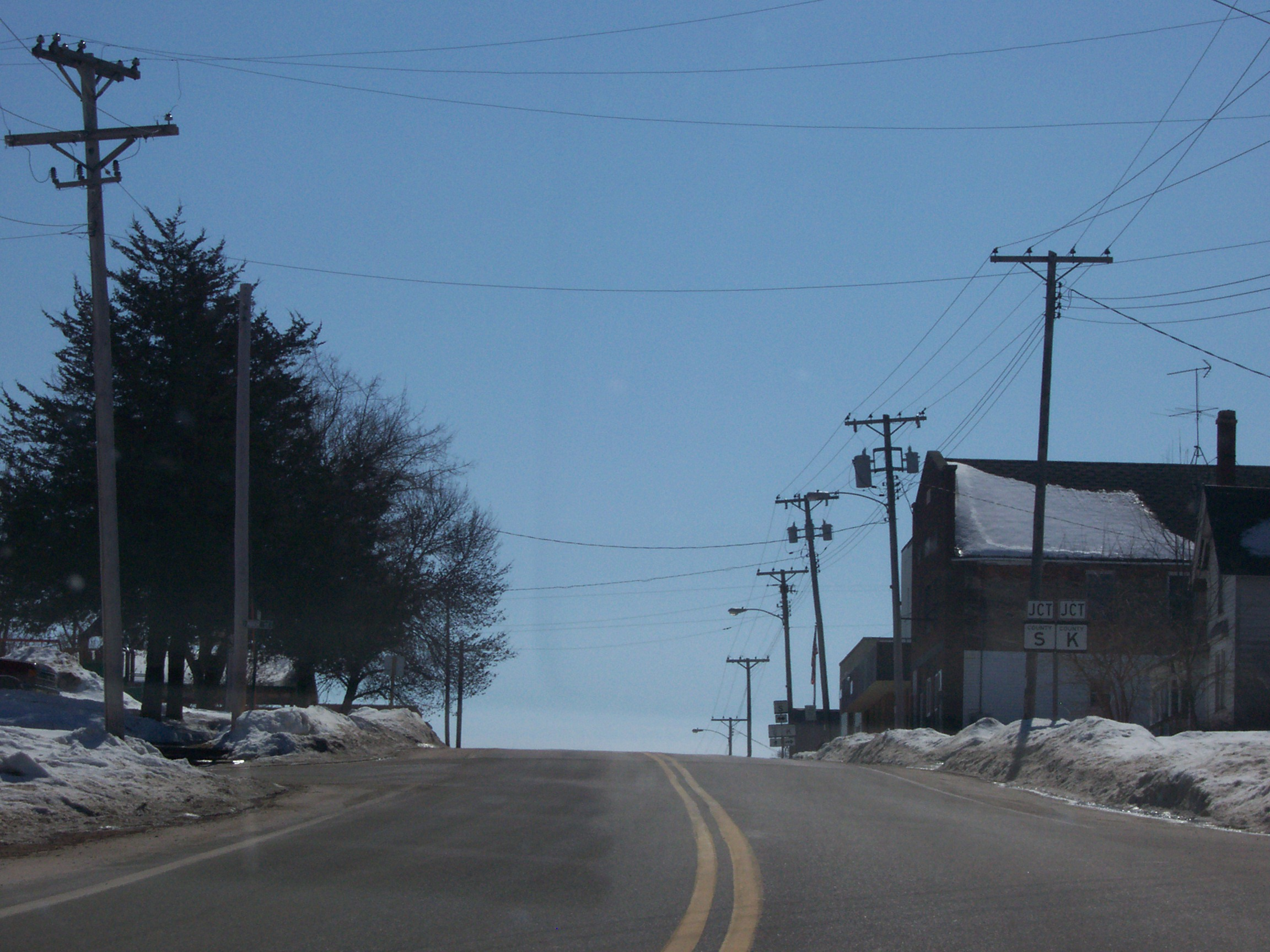
- Looking south at Lime Ridge

- Location of Lime Ridge in Sauk County, Wisconsin.
- Coordinates: 43°28′5″N 90°9′13″W
- Country: United States
- State: Wisconsin
- County: Sauk

Area
  - Total: 1.00 sq mi (2.59 km^{2})
  - Land: 1.00 sq mi (2.59 km^{2})
  - Water: 0 sq mi (0.00 km^{2})
- Elevation: 1,180 ft (360 m)

Population (2020)
  - Total: 158
  - Density: 158/sq mi (61.0/km^{2})
- Time zone: UTC-6 (Central (CST))
  - Summer (DST): UTC-5 (CDT)
- Area code: 608
- FIPS code: 55-44225
- GNIS feature ID: 1568058

Lime Ridge is a village in Sauk County, Wisconsin, United States. The population was 158 at the 2020 census.

== Geography ==
Lime Ridge is located at 43°28′5″N 90°9′13″W (43.468074, -90.153701).

According to the United States Census Bureau, the village has a total area of 1.01 square miles (2.62 km^{2}), all land.

== History ==
The earliest settlers of Lime Ridge, as they arrived in the late 1850s, cleared the land of timber to plant crops, though others used the hardwood to make and sell railroad ties and stave bolts. The first post office was established in 1858. In 1867, Wesley Marsh opened a store, which was sold a few years later to John T. Pollock, and again in 1876 to Robert L. Bohn, an Ohio family that also built a dam and sawmill. Bohn bought hardwood timber from area farmers and converted it to barrel staves shipped to urban markets. Bohn also opened a hotel and in 1909 founded the State Bank of Lime Ridge. In 1874, the United Brethren opened a house of worship, used too by Baptists and Methodists in the community. In 1890, an Adventist church served members of that faith. After the population of German immigrants rose, in 1906 Trinity Lutheran church was built to serve that community. In 1912, St. Boniface Church was formed to serve the Catholic community.

Lime Ridge was incorporated in 1913. Rural electrification reached the village in 1922; the population at that time had risen to about 200. The Great Depression together with World War II proved crippling to the local economy; the bank and hotel closed, and several other businesses followed. Many residents today work in other places.

== Demographics ==
Historical population
Census	Pop.	Note	%±
1920	256		—
1930	230		−10.2%
1940	197		−14.3%
1950	183		−7.1%
1960	152		−16.9%
1970	203		33.6%
1980	191		−5.9%
1990	152		−20.4%
2000	169		11.2%
2010	162		−4.1%
2020	158		−2.5%
U.S. Decennial Census

=== 2010 census ===
As of the census of 2010, there were 162 people, 70 households, and 44 families living in the village. The population density was 160.4 inhabitants per square mile (61.9/km^{2}). There were 78 housing units at an average density of 77.2 per square mile (29.8/km^{2}). The racial makeup of the village was 99.4% White and 0.6% Native American.

There were 70 households, of which 28.6% had children under the age of 18 living with them, 51.4% were married couples living together, 4.3% had a female householder with no husband present, 7.1% had a male householder with no wife present, and 37.1% were non-families. 25.7% of all households were made up of individuals, and 10% had someone living alone who was 65 years of age or older. The average household size was 2.31 and the average family size was 2.77.

The median age in the village was 44.5 years. 20.4% of residents were under the age of 18; 5% were between the ages of 18 and 24; 26% were from 25 to 44; 30.9% were from 45 to 64; and 17.9% were 65 years of age or older. The gender makeup of the village was 52.5% male and 47.5% female.

=== 2000 census ===
As of the census of 2000, there were 169 people, 69 households, and 48 families living in the village. The population density was 167.3 people per square mile (64.6/km^{2}). There were 77 housing units at an average density of 76.2 per square mile (29.4/km^{2}). The racial makeup of the village was 100.00% White. Hispanic or Latino of any race were 0.59% of the population.

There were 69 households, out of which 30.4% had children under the age of 18 living with them, 62.3% were married couples living together, 7.2% had a female householder with no husband present, and 29.0% were non-families. 18.8% of all households were made up of individuals, and 11.6% had someone living alone who was 65 years of age or older. The average household size was 2.45 and the average family size was 2.82.

In the village, the population was spread out, with 23.7% under the age of 18, 6.5% from 18 to 24, 32.5% from 25 to 44, 18.3% from 45 to 64, and 18.9% who were 65 years of age or older. The median age was 38 years. For every 100 females, there were 116.7 males. For every 100 females age 18 and over, there were 104.8 males.

The median income for a household in the village was $41,500, and the median income for a family was $41,000. Males had a median income of $35,625 versus $19,500 for females. The per capita income for the village was $17,006. About 5.6% of families and 4.6% of the population were below the poverty line, including none of those under the age of eighteen or sixty five or over.

== Notable person ==
- Lyle E. Schaller, theologian and writer, was born on a farm about two miles south of Lime Ridge.

== Images ==
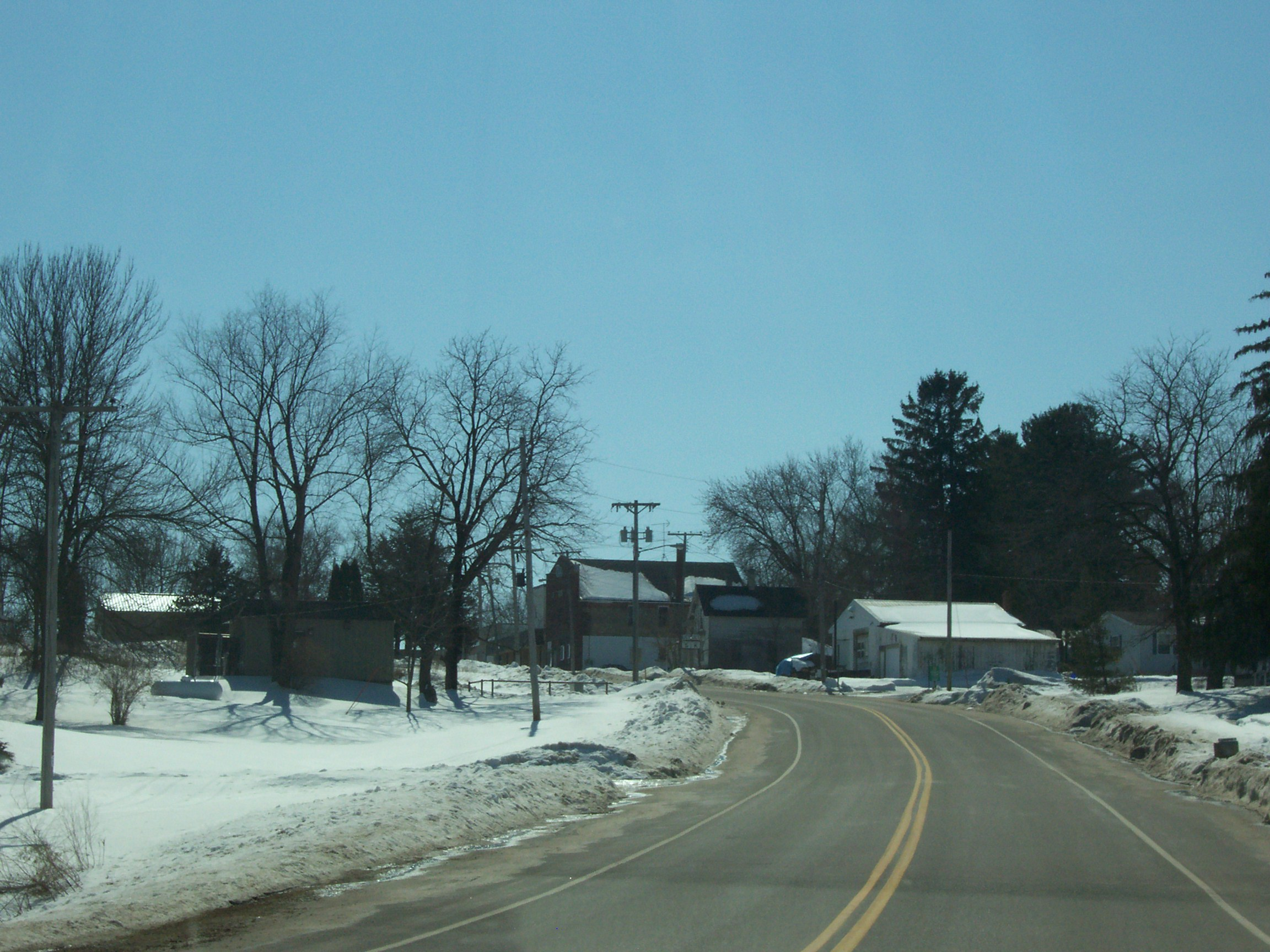
Looking south at Lime Ridge

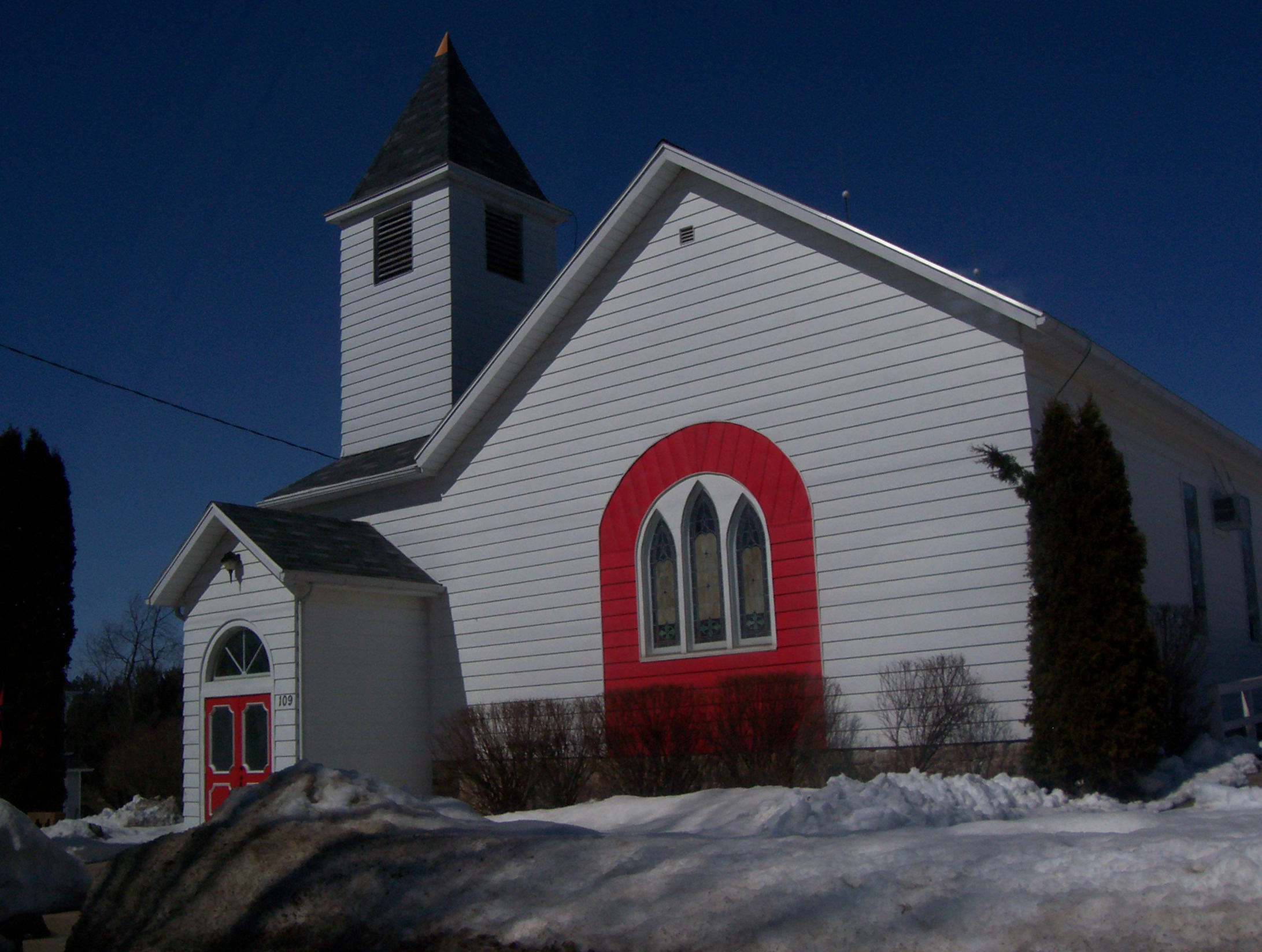
Church in Lime Ridge

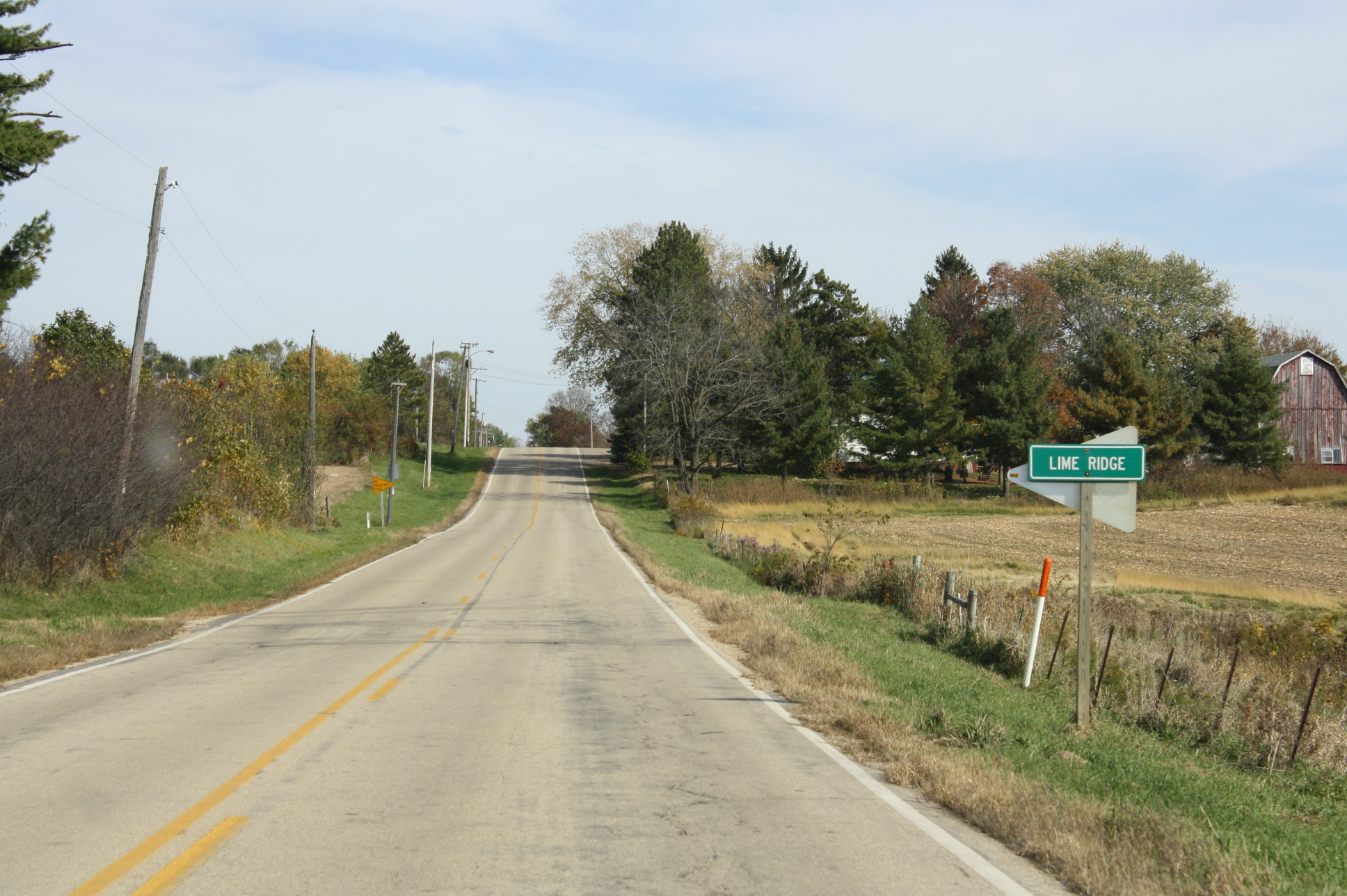
Sign on County K
