= Bruce Ough =

Bruce Robert Ough (/oʊ/ oh; born 12 February 1951, in Williston, North Dakota) is a United Methodist Church bishop, elected in 2000.

== Birth and family ==
Ough was married to Charlene Ann Feldner Henning on 14 August 1976. They have three children: Lance, Stuart and Matthew.

== Education ==
Ough earned a B.A. degree from North Dakota State University in 1973. He originally intended to study biochemistry, but ended up majoring in psychology and sociology and minoring in political science. His M.Div. is from Garrett-Evangelical Theological Seminary (1978). He also did graduate work at Northwestern University.

During his ministry, Ough completed the Upper Room's two-year Academy of Spiritual Formation program, and has served on the leadership team for the academy.

== Ordained ministry ==
Ough served as the Youth Ministry Director at Faith United Methodist Church of Fargo, North Dakota from 1969 to 1972. He was also the Camp Program Director of the North Dakota Annual Conference (1975–77), and an intern on the Dakotas Episcopal Area Program Staff (1976–77).

While in seminary, he served as Associate Pastor of the Grace United Methodist Church in Chicago, Illinois. Following seminary he became director of the Conference Council on Ministries of the Dakotas Area, a position which he held from 1978 to 1982. He was director of the Oakwood Spiritual Life Center in the North Indiana Annual Conference from 1982 to 1985), then moved to Iowa where he became the Council Director of the Iowa Annual Conference (1985–92). He was appointed Superintendent of the Cedar Rapids District of the Iowa Conference in 1992, serving until 1997. Ough's last appointment before election as a bishop was as pastor of St. Paul's United Methodist Church in Cedar Rapids (1997–

He also served as an adjunct faculty member of the University of Dubuque Theological Seminary (U.D.T.S.).

== Service to the church at large ==
Ough was elected a delegate to the General and Jurisdictional Conference of the United Methodist Church from 1988 to 2000. He also served on the North Central Jurisdictional Committee on Episcopacy and as a member of the U.D.T.S. Council of Advisors.

== Episcopal ministry ==
Following nomination by the Iowa Annual Conference, Ough was elected to the Episcopacy and consecrated a bishop in July 2000 by the North Central Jurisdictional Conference of the United Methodist Church.

== See also ==
- List of bishops of the United Methodist Church
