= Lyle E. Schaller =

- Born: Lyle Edwin Schaller; April 19, 1923; Lime Ridge, Wisconsin
- Died: March 18, 2015 (aged 91); Oklahoma City, Oklahoma
- Spouse: Agnes Woods Peterson (m. 1946–2015)

Lyle Edwin Schaller (April 19, 1923 – March 18, 2015) was an American parish consultant, author, workshop leader, and speaker whom Christianity Today called “the dean of church consultants”.

== General accomplishments ==
Schaller wrote 55 books, edited 44 others, and published thousands of essays in Christian periodicals. In addition, his monthly newsletter, The Parish Paper, reached over 200,000 subscribers in 28 denominations. The Wisdom of Lyle E. Schaller: The Elder Statesman of Church Leadership by Warren Bird was published in 2012. In this book, over twenty-five ministers wrote about the ways that Schaller influenced their ministries, while the editor provides highlights from Schaller's work on such varied subjects as small churches, large churches, and how to prepare for change.

Schaller averaged "about 150 on-site church consultations per year ... gathering statistics and interviewing church leaders, youth, ministers’ spouses, non-leader congregants, and pastors from nearby churches. At the end of each consultation, he reported his 360-degree view, analysis and list of practical suggestions for congregational health and growth."

He was named as the most influential Protestant leader in a 1988–1989 survey of almost 1500 national and religious leaders, ahead of Martin E. Marty, Robert McAfee Brown and Billy Graham.

== Biography ==
Lyle Edwin Schaller was born April 19, 1923, as the second and youngest child of Tillie (née Cepek; 1883–1964) and Walter S. Schaller (1880–1971). He grew up on the family dairy farm in Lime Ridge, Wisconsin.

In 1946, he married Agnes Woods Peterson.

While attending the University of Wisconsin, he decided to go into the ministry. He graduated "with distinction" from Garrett Theological Seminary (now Garrett-Evangelical Theological Seminary) in 1957 and served a three-point circuit from 1955 to 1958 in Briggsville, Endeavor, and Moundville, Wisconsin. Later he became the first director of the Regional Church Planning Office in Cleveland, Ohio. His first book, Planning for Protestantism in Urban America, was published in 1964.

From 1968 to 1971, he served as the director of the Center for Parish Development at Evangelical Theological Seminary (now Garrett-Evangelical Theological Seminary) in Naperville, Illinois. For the next twenty-two years, he was associated with Yokefellow Institute in Richmond, Indiana, presenting workshops and consulting with churches. In 1971 he started The Parish Paper, a monthly newsletter that reached a circulation of two hundred thousand. Schaller died on March 18, 2015, of heart failure.

== Awards and recognitions ==
- Council of Bishops Letter upon Retirement
- Named most influential figure in Hartford Seminary 1988–89 poll of Protestant church leaders

== Writing ==
Schaller's fifty-fifth and final book, 44 Ways to Increase Church Attendance was published in 2010. He is also the co-author, editor, or series author of about forty other books. He co-authored an audio book with Leith Anderson. In 1998 Abingdon Press compiled forty-six of his books (all published by Abingdon), together with hundreds of editions of The Parish Paper in digital format, as The Church Consultant: The Collected Works on CD-ROM. His best-known books include:

- The change agent (1972)
- Community organization: conflict and reconciliation (1966)
- The impact of the future (1969)
- Planning for Protestantism in urban America (1965)
- The churches' war on poverty (1967)
- Understanding tomorrow (1976)
- Assimilating new members (1978)
- Parish planning (1968)
- The decision-makers; how to improve the quality of decision-making in the churches (1974)
- Creative church administration (1975)
- Survival tactics in the parish (1977)
- The small church is different (1982)
- Effective church planning (1979)
- The multiple staff and the larger church (1980)
- Hey, that's our church by Lyle E Schaller (1975)
- The local church looks to the future (1968)
- Growing plans (1983)
- Activating the passive church : diagnosis & treatment (1981)
- The pastor and the people; building a new partnership for effective ministry (1973)
- Getting things done : concepts and skills for leaders (1986)
