= James Samuel Thomas =

American bishop

- Resident Bishop
- Church: United Methodist Church
- See: Ohio East Episcopal Area
- In office: 1976–88
- Predecessor: Francis Enmer Kearns
- Successor: Edwin Charles Boulton
- Previous posts: Resident Bishop, Iowa Area, Bishop

Personal details
- Born: April 8, 1919 Orangeburg, South Carolina
- Died: October 10, 2010 (aged 91)

James Samuel Thomas (April 8, 1919 – October 10, 2010) was an American bishop in The Methodist Church (now The United Methodist Church). When elected in 1964, he was one of the youngest Methodist bishops. Gerald Kennedy was age 40 when he was elected in the mid-1940s.

His first appointment as Bishop was in Iowa, where he served from 1964 to 1976, becoming the first black bishop of the North Central Jurisdiction of The Methodist Church. He last served as the Resident Bishop of the East Ohio Conference of The United Methodist Church from 1976 until 1988, retiring in 1988.

James S. Thomas wrote the book "Methodism's Racial Dilemma. The Story of the Central Jurisdiction."

In 2002, the Iowa Senate passed a resolution honoring Bishop Thomas. In its citation, the Senate extended

"its thanks and congratulations to Bishop James S. Thomas and his family for their service to The United Methodist Church and to the State of Iowa, and acknowledges the work of Bishop James S. Thomas for the advancement of civil rights in Iowa and in the nation."

The resolution was presented to Bishop Thomas on his birthday in the same year.

== See also ==
- List of bishops of the United Methodist Church

== Notes ==
Religious titles
Preceded by Francis Enmer Kearns	Resident Bishop, Ohio East Area, United Methodist Church; 1976–1988	Succeeded by Edwin Charles Boulton
