= John S. Stamm =

American bishop

John Samuel Stamm (1878–1956) was an American bishop of the Evangelical Church, elected in 1926.

== Biography ==
Stamm was born on a Sunday morning (to his parents, an indication God had a special work for him), 23 March 1878, a son of Hanz and Mary Stamm. The Stamms were devout Christians and members of the Evangelical Association Church in Alida, Geary County, Kansas, which they had helped organize seven years before.

=== Conversion and call ===
At the age of ten, John became so disturbed by a sermon he heard one Sunday morning that he went to a hillside after church to pray.

"I prayed because I had a very keen sense of the need of the saving grace of God in Christ. Suddenly, as I was praying there came to me a sense of peace, release and trust...a new joy filled my life...I came into an assurance that I was a Christian...because I had come into personal saving relationship with God." A few Sundays later, his Pastor remarked that he was growing old and would soon need to lay down his work. He asked, "Who will take my place?" And young John Stamm remembers thinking "I will!"

At the age of eighteen he experienced another turning point in his young life. Sitting with several other teenage boys one night when the preacher gave the invitation to come to the altar, John turned to his friends and said, "If I go, will you go?" They assured him they would. So they filed down the center aisle to the altar. "That night I found Jesus Christ as my personal Savior," Bishop Stamm later wrote. "It was an experience of great joy and meaning and still is today," he wrote in 1955. "I made a complete turnabout in life. Instead of doubting God, I now loved Him...things of the spirit had new interest and challenge for me...the call of the Christian ministry came to me with clear and convincing urgency."

=== Education ===
Stamm had completed less than five grades of public school when he turned twenty. Nevertheless, that fall he sold his horse and other possessions to obtain enough money for a train ticket to Naperville, Illinois, the home of The Evangelical Association's North Central College and Evangelical Theological Seminary (E.T.S.). He took sub-academy courses at the college, along with others who had also not finished high school. Twelve years later Stamm had completed his college degree and graduated from the seminary. In 1927, E.T.S. honored him with a Doctor of Divinity degree. He received a Doctor of Laws degree from Albright College in 1936, a Doctor of Humane Letters from North Central College in 1949, and a Doctor of Sacred Theology from Dickinson College in 1951.

=== Ordained ministry ===
In 1901 Stamm was appointed Pastor of the Glasgow, Missouri Evangelical Mission. "When I met the Class Leader at the railroad station, he greeted me rather formally, then said, 'I had better tell you right away, we do not want you.' He said they had requested the conference not to send an unmarried man to this mission." While serving there Stamm became acquainted with Priscilla Marie Wahl. She taught in the Primary Department of the Sunday School and was elected Superintendent when only nineteen. On 19 March 1912 they were married during the time that Rev. Stamm was the Pastor of the Manhattan Evangelical Church. Shortly thereafter he was appointed to the Oak Park Village Church.

Two nights before Christmas, 1918, Bishop Spreng informed Rev. Stamm by telephone that he had been elected to teach Systematic Theology at E.T.S. He remained at the seminary until elected Bishop. His theological scholarship was recognized in his service as a Consulting Editor for the publication of both the Revised Standard Version of the Bible and of The Interpreters Bible.

=== Episcopal ministry ===
His first assignment as Bishop of the Evangelical Church was Kansas City. During those first eight years, Stamm also served as the General Secretary of Evangelism for his denomination. After Kansas City, in 1934 he was assigned to Harrisburg, Pennsylvania. There he also served until 1941 as President of The Evangelical School of Theology at Reading, Pennsylvania.

Bishop Stamm gave statesman-like leadership to the Pennsylvania Council of Churches (1945–49) and to the Federal Council of Churches (1948–50), serving as President of each of those organizations. He was a member of the 1948 organizing Assembly of the World Council of Churches, serving on its Central Committee until 1954.

=== Retirement ===
When Bishop Stamm requested retirement at the 1950 General Conference of the Evangelical United Brethren Church, he said

"Through the goodness of God, I have been able to serve in the Cheristian ministry for more than fifty-one and a half years...From the hour when I yielded to God in response to the call to the Christian ministry to this very day, I have been under a commanding sense of stewardship which impelled me to make this ministry central in my thought and life: to give Christ the preeminence in all things, and to give myself wholly to this work...I can honestly say, I was not disobedient to the heavenly vision."

Bishop Stamm closed his farewell address by saying

"I am not tired of the Christian ministry...The years that lie ahead are in the hands of God...Officially I will stand on the sidelines, but I shall cheer for our leaders. I shall do more. I shall pray",

=== Death ===
Bishop Stamm died March 5, 1956.

== Selected writings ==
- Evangelism and Christian Experience, Harrisburg, Pennsylvania: Evangelical Press, 1930.
- From Farm Boy to Bishop, Builders, Vol. 62, 26 February, 5 March 1955.

== Biography ==
- Findley, C.R., Life Sketch of Bishop Stamm, read at the Bishop's funeral.

== See also ==
- List of bishops of the United Methodist Church
