= Liz-N-Val =

American painter

Houston and Mercer Billboard, 1985.

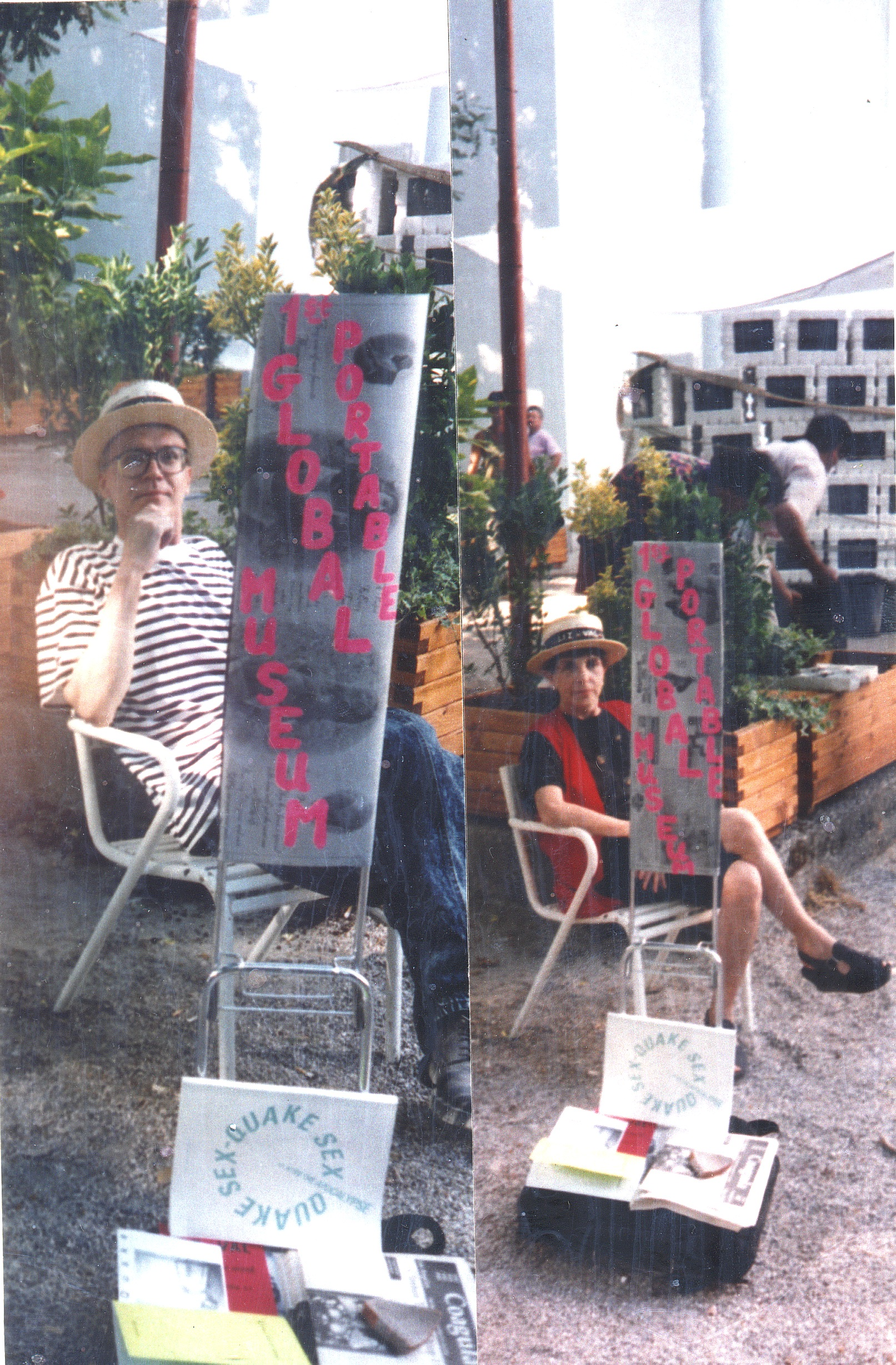
1st Portable Global Museum 1993 Venice Biennale.

Liz-N-Val with 1st Global Museum at 2011 Venice Biennale

Liz-N-Val Rolled Peel 2012

Liz-N-Val is the moniker of the Eastern European art team Elizabeth Clark and Valentine Goroshko. They have been a working team for over thirty years inventing numerous conceptual museums and the concept of Signature Art. Liz-N-Val have mixed a variety of mediums including drawing, painting, sculpture and the combination of all of the above plus language art.

== Biographies ==
Elizabeth Clark was born in 1931 in Warsaw, Poland. Valentin Goroshko was born in 1944 in Minsk, Belarus. Elizabeth Clark and Valentine Goroshko met in the late 1970s and started a collaboration, producing art, events and transgressions in both private and public space.

== Work ==
=== Early work ===
Steven Breslow wrote about their exhibition "Clark and Goroshko Rockin’ 80's", 1981, at White Columns: “Mixing multi-media, sculpture, painting, graffiti", collage, conceptual language games in Russian and English and even earthworks, into forceful forms that make gritty political and social statements, they open a wide door into a complexly ironic and pluralistic mode of art which does not have a name as yet”.

The artists together established new forms of art, including ‘Signature Art’, ‘Abstractrealism’, and ‘Talking Disco’. As a conceptual enterprise, they also created numerous Museums: Museum Of Abstractrealism, Museum of Truth-N-Beauty, Museum of Something-N-Nothing, Museum of Art After Art, Global Museum and Museum Of Everything.

Their first public work, funded by the Bronx Council for the Arts, was a 24’ structure at The People's Convention in South Bronx in 1980. It consisted of a tower, billboards, canvas and painted words: People’s Reconstruction. The local lumber yard donated lumber for the project. It was situated on what looked like a moonscape and only lasted a few days because the practical and impoverished local people took it apart and used the materials for themselves. The event received coverage by Channels 5, 7 and 11.

SoHo walls, in the early 80s, were littered with posters hawking the latest novelties Clark-N-Goroshko added their own conceptual posters to the neighborhood. One poster, Sex Sports proposed ‘Sex Sports’ for the Moscow Olympics and another Sex Workers of the World Unite. Woman Wanted For Rape caused a minor riot in a local candy store. The owner put the ‘Rape’ poster in the store window; soon a lesbian group threatened to vandalize the store unless it was removed. Ironically, the woman in the poster happened to be one of the artists, Liz. Later, the couple set up tables on West Broadway, where they created a public interaction using the poster and passing out questionnaires; these materials were later used at Queens College in a class called The Anthropology of Sexuality.

=== Middle period ===
In the mid-80's the artists decided to sign their work using their first names and became Liz-N-Val. One day, Liz-N-Val found a large piece of framed plywood leaning next to their door on Mercer Street. They promptly signed and copyrighted it with their name, creating a new kind of art called Signature Art. It received coverage in Art News in an article called “Trash or Treasure” by Eleanor Heartney. They began signing Pepsi, Coke and V8 cans, one of which was bought by Leo Castelli. They followed this with a Portable Museum in a shopping cart, which traveled around SoHo, showing and selling Macintosh apples. The Portable Museum sold signed apples for $5.00 and unsigned ones for $1.00.

In 1985, when they were doing ‘Street Art’, they became involved in a lawsuit with Steven Spielberg. At the time they were painting huge illicit heads on buildings all over New York. Spielberg was making a film called Batteries Not Included in the East Village and decided to include one of their heads in his film. Unfortunately, he paid someone else to copy it and even appropriated their name, Liz-N-Val in the image. Against everyone's advice, Liz-N-Val sued him and won. Around this time they did a billboard and were challenged by the owners. The billboard was left unfinished and the artists fled. Morisawa- Linotype, a Japanese company included two images of walls they had painted in SoHo, in their 1984 New York Graffiti Calendar.

Liz-N-Val did a series of interactive street events, starting with Talking Disco, a rap performance proposing a disco floor for MOMA, in collaboration with Kosalapov and Bakhchenyan. The group was interviewed by a black radio station and an article followed in the Village Voice. Later Liz-N-Val appeared at the 1993 Venice Biennial and exhibited their 1st Portable Global Museum.

Woof was born in 2002: the artists dragged a 6” X 8” canvas attached to a leash around the Soho streets, face down. The piece was nameless until a little boy walking behind them asked his mother what they were doing. She told him that they were probably taking their pet for a walk. And that's how the name Woof came into being. John Gibson is the owner of an early Woof piece. Later it was exhibited in the smallest museum in the world - the Museum of Contemporary Art in Pontiac, Michigan.

Dressed as aliens carrying signs saying "Seeking Truth and Beauty", they got a big response from truckers who shouted out their windows, "you won't find any of that here". Sometimes they would put small canvases around their necks, as breast plates and go to art openings. One had the painted words, Seeking Creative Supporters; another had a knife sticking out of it.

=== Latest work ===
Liz-N-Val started doing "crumpled wall pieces" with New York Times aluminum printing plates in 1984, and continued crumpling other materials (paper, canvas, metal) up until 2012. They proposed a number of monuments: one in homage to Manzoni - a giant rock pile with a small golden box on top with the logo: Manzoni’s Shit (2006). Another proposed monument, Crime Path, consisted of a road made of large aluminum plates, covered with painted black footprints going into the distance. Jesus Slept Here, was designed as a bed with a cushion made from aluminum plates. The most recent monumental project by Liz-N-Val is Global Museum Presents Abstractrealism (2012): a natural piece of canvas painted with multi-colored words: illegal - unsanctified - interactions - occupations - transgressions - monetary-market-relational-esthetics. In the summer of 2017, they showed up at the Whitney Museum wearing an enormous sign (about 3’ H x 2’ W) emblazoned with the message: ‘Portable Art’.

Liz-N-Val have an improvisational attitude that combines space, time, materials and form as conceptual events. To the present time, they have continued to explore and redefine the parameters of Art: its making and viewing. For example, the sign: ‘WET PAINT’ has shifted, over time, from convention to concept - to appearing on T- shirts and devolving into a possible exhibition.

Currently exhibiting and curating Gallery shows, for example: at the Clemente Center on the Lower East Side.
