= Eliza Clark Hughes =

American physician

- Born: 1817; Wheeling, Virginia
- Died: 17 May 1882 (aged 64–65); Portland, Ohio
- Occupation: Medical doctor

Eliza Clark Hughes (1817–1882) was an American medical doctor. She was one of the first female M.Ds in the states of Virginia and West Virginia.

== Biography ==
Eliza Clark Hughes was born in Wheeling, Virginia in 1817. Her father was a prominent local merchant who had invested in lumber yards and steamboats, taking advantage of Wheeling growing economic importance in the 1830s. As such, Eliza was able to obtain a good education (described as an English-style education by one source), presumably at a local academy or at a boarding school outside of Wheeling. Given her family's importance in the area, Eliza was acquainted with medial professionals in the area, and her older brother Alfred became a physician - these relationships likely inspired Eliza's interest in the medical field. When her father died in 1849, he left a generous inheritance for his daughter that allowed her to pursue her medical interests.

In the 1850s, Hughes left Wheeling to study under Dr. Joseph Longshore at Penn Medical University, one of the first medical colleges to admit women in the United States. Some sources describe Hughes as being the first female MD in the state of Virginia, while others note she was only one of the first and possibly the first M.D. in Appalachia. During her studies under Longshore, Hughes became interested in the use of homoeopathic medicine. By 1860, she had returned to Wheeling and joined her brother's practice, advertising her services as being specialized for women and children.

During the American Civil War, Eliza and the rest of the Hughes family were staunch supporters of the Confederacy, with Eliza herself going so far as to have a brief personal correspondence with Confederate president Jefferson Davis. The Hughes' hometown of Wheeling was predominantly pro-Union, and so the once-influential family quickly became ostracized. Alfred's doctors practice was eventually forced to close, and in 1862 Eliza herself was arrested after she refused to take the oath of allegiance to the United States; soon after her arrest, she took the oath and was released. She continued to practice medicine, but was increasingly distracted by the war, and she was eventually summoned to court and charged with slandering a pro-Union woman. Sources imply that her pro-Southern stance during the conflict also resulted in her being ostracized from the Northern medical community, as her name does not appear on all contemporary lists of female M.Ds.

After the conclusion of the Civil War, Hughes continued to work as a physician in Wheeling, but sources have noted that mentions of her decrease after 1870. In the 1880s she moved to Baltimore to continue her practice, but by 1882 she had returned to Wheeling. She died in May 1882 in Portland, Ohio, where she was visiting a patient.
