= Elizabeth Clarke =

Woman accused of witchcraft

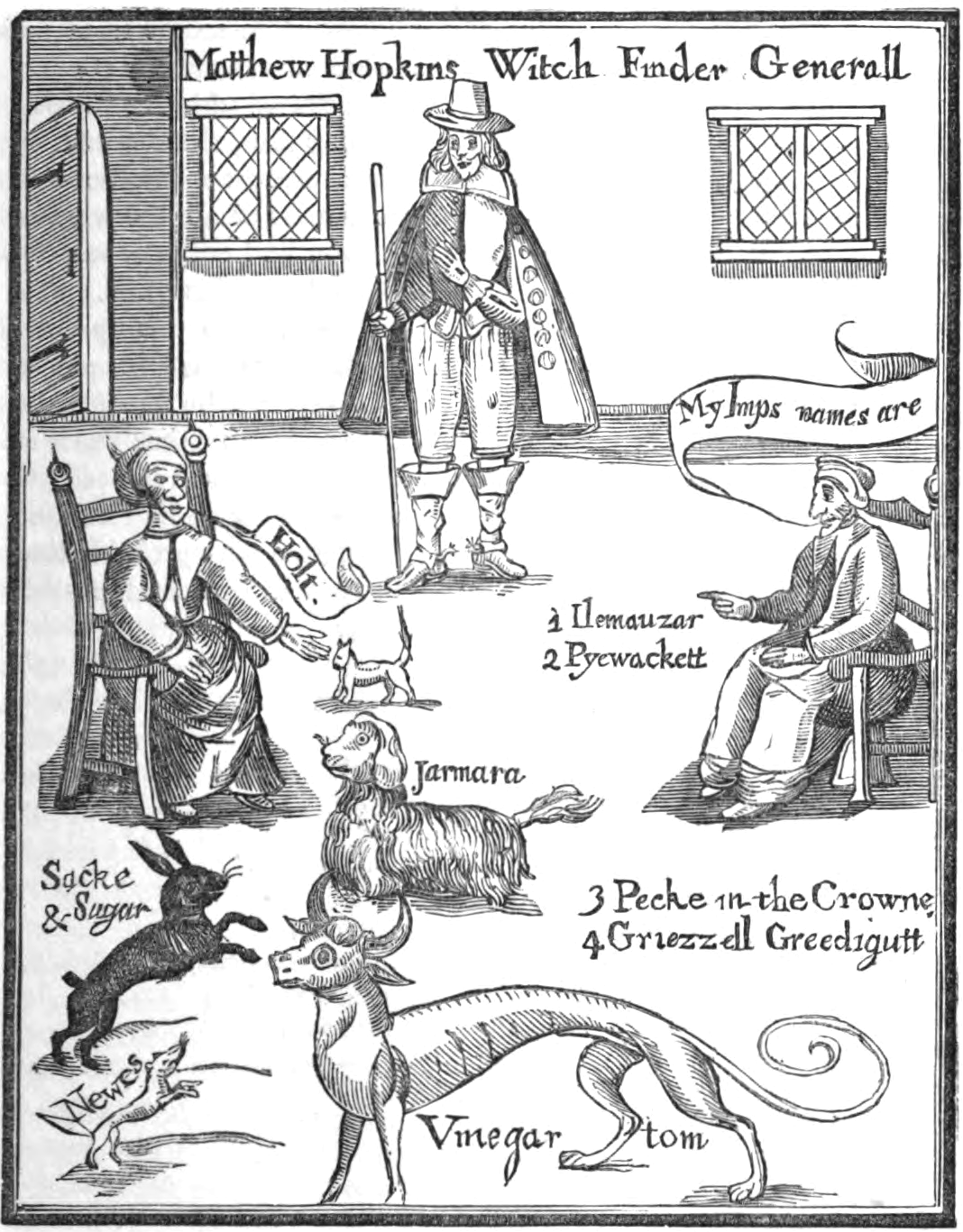
Frontispiece of The Discovery of Witches, 1647. Elizabeth Clarke appears on the right

Elizabeth Clarke (c. 1606–1645), alias Bedinfield, was the first woman persecuted by the Witchfinder General, Matthew Hopkins in 1645 in Essex, England. At 39 years old, she was accused of witchcraft by local tailor John Rivet. Hopkins and John Stearne took on the role of investigators, stating that they had seen familiars while watching her. During the process, she was deprived of sleep for multiple nights before confessing and implicating other women in the local area. She was tried at Chelmsford assizes, before being hanged for witchcraft.

== Background ==
Clarke was born in 1606 in Bradfield, Essex to Bartholomew and an unnamed mother. Clarke had one younger sister, Jane Clarke, who was born in 1609. As a child Clarke's witnessed her mother being accused of being a witch. Her mother was subsequently jailed, tried, and executed for the crime. The records of this trial and her mothers name have been lost. Later in life Clarke moved to the neighbouring parish of Manningtree with her father, Bartholomew, who died in 1614.

In 1621 Clarke moved in with her sister, who had recently married Richard Benifield. After this move Clarke also became known by the name Elizabeth Bedinfield, adopting her sisters new last name. Jane later died in 1630 and when Clarke gave birth to a baby girl on 12 February 1643, she named the child Jane in memory of her sister. Clarke named the baby's father as Joseph Applegate, but the couple was unwed, and Clarke later explained that she named him so he could be forced to pay child support. The baby was baptised at Thomas Witham's chapel.

Clarke was disabled, having only one leg, and used the aid of a crutch. She struggled with poverty throughout her life and following the death of her sister had no form of familiar support.

== Witchcraft trial ==
Clarke was accused of cursing the wife of a local tailor, John Rivet during the winter of 1645. A lynch mob brought her to Sir Harbottle Grimston, her landowner, who decided that she should be tried. Matthew Hopkins, assisted by John Stearne and Mary Phillipps, took up the role of investigator and prosecutor, known as "Watcher".

Although torture was illegal in England, suspected witches were subject to scrutiny by their Watchers. In Clarke's case, Hopkins and colleagues including John Stearne watched her for three days and nights without allowing her to sleep. During this process Clarke was forced to continually walk around her room, a process known as "watching and walking". Clarke's body was also inspected by four women, who claimed they found witch's marks.

On the third night of the "watching and walking", Hopkins claimed to have witnessed Clarke summoning familiars, imps in animal form. During this ordeal, Clarke implicated other women from Manningtree, Anne West and her daughter Rebecca, Anne Leech, Helen Leech, and Elizabeth Gooding as well as women from other villages. Clarke stated that she had been brought into witchcraft by Anne West, who took pity on her due to her poverty and only having one leg. Hopkins also claimed that Clarke had admitted to having "carnal copulation with the devil". It was claimed she had slept with the devil four to three times a week, over the span of seven years.

The women discovered by Hopkins were tried at Chelmsford assizes on 17 July 1645. During the trial the watchers gave different accounts of the appearances of Clarke's familiars but Clarke was found guilty of feeding familiar spirits, and with killing John Edwards, a local child who died in the summer of 1644. In total, 36 women were imprisoned and the majority of them were sentenced to death.

=== List of Clarke's familiars ===
During the testimonies of the watchers, they described many of the imps that he saw with Clarke, including:

- Jarmana - a white dog with sandy spots, fat with short legs
- Vinegar Tom - a greyhound with long legs, who turned into a 4-year-old boy with no head
- A black imp
- Newes - A pole cat with a large head
- Hoult - a white imp, smaller than a cat
- White imps that went to bed with Clarke in the shape of a "proper gentleman" with a laced band.
- Three brown imps from her mother
- Sacke and Sugar - a demonic black rabbit
- Other familiars referred to by name but not description: Elemauzer, Pyewacket, Peck-in-the-crown & Grizel Greedigut.
