= Kilmeston =

Village and parish in Hampshire, England

Coordinates: 51°01′50″N 1°09′37″W

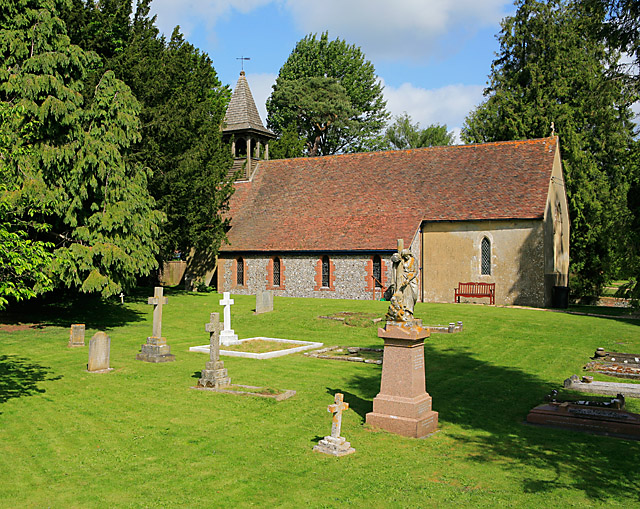
- St Andrew's Church

- Location within Hampshire
- Population: 200; 276 (2011 Census)
- OS grid reference: SU 59013 26285
- Civil parish: Kilmiston
- District: City of Winchester
- Shire county: Hampshire
- Region: South East
- Country: England
- Sovereign state: United Kingdom
- Post town: Alresford
- Postcode district: SO24
- Dialling code: 01962
- Police: Hampshire and Isle of Wight
- Fire: Hampshire and Isle of Wight
- Ambulance: South Central
- UK Parliament: Winchester

Kilmeston is a small village and civil parish in the City of Winchester district of Hampshire, England. Historically the village has been known as Chelmestune or Kilmiston, and some sources still quote Kilmiston as the official name of the civil parish.

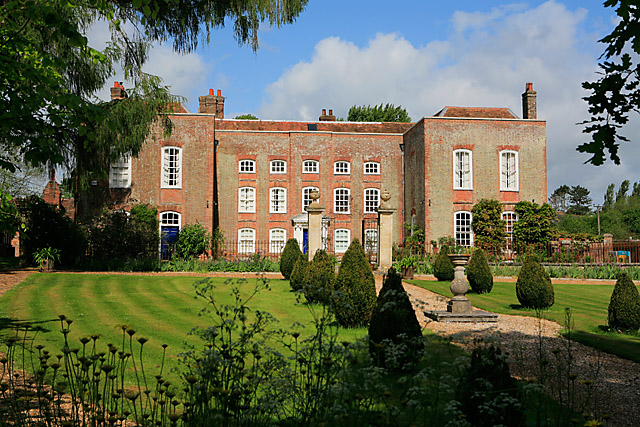
Kilmeston Manor, Kilmeston (2007) by Peter Facey

Kilmeston Manor, a substantial country house, is a grade II* listed building.

The parish church of St Andrew has its origin in medieval times. Rebuilt in 1772 and again in the late 19th century, it is also a grade II listed building.

Lt-Gen. Sir Henry Warde, a former Governor of Barbados, lived at Dean House, Kilmeston.
