= John B. Ellington Jr. =

United States Air Force general

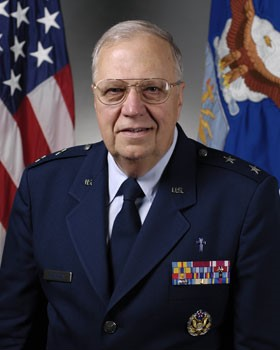
Maj. Gen. John B. Ellington Jr.

John B. Ellington Jr. is a former major general in the Air National Guard and director of the National Guard Chaplain Corps and Air National Guard Assistant to the Chief of Chaplains of the United States Air Force.

== Biography ==
An ordained Anglican priest, Ellington presides over Indian Lake Community Church in Russells Point, Ohio. He has attended Malone University, the Methodist Theological School in Ohio, Wright State University and Ashland Theological Seminary.

== Career ==
Ellington joined the Air National Guard in 1979. He retired in 2011.

Awards he has received include the Defense Distinguished Service Medal, the Legion of Merit and the Meritorious Service Medal.
