= Eliza Clark Garrett =

American philanthropist from Chicago

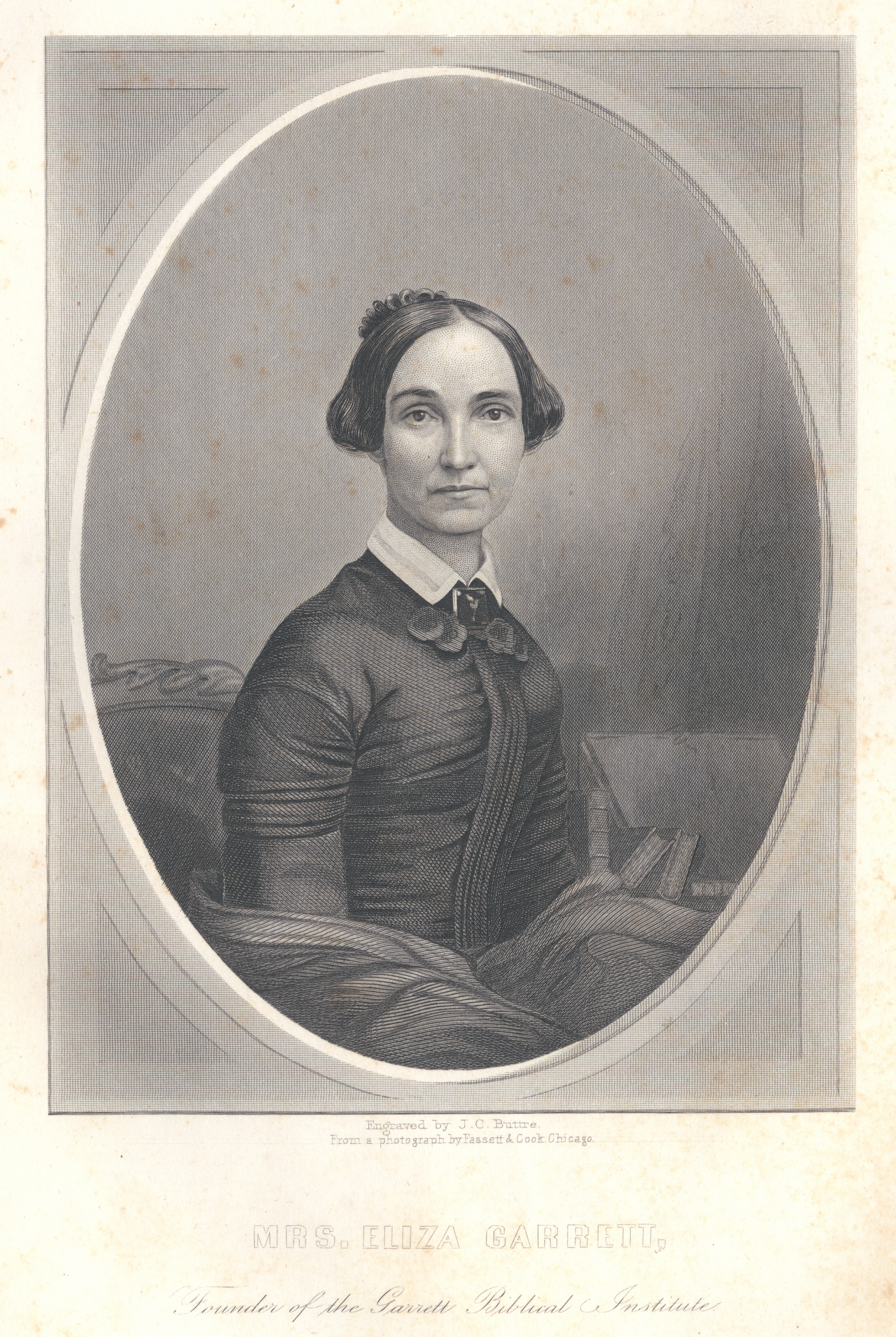
An 1858 engraving of Garrett, based on an earlier photograph

Eliza Clark Garrett (March 5, 1805 – November 24, 1855) was an American educator and philanthropist. She played an important role in the early history of Chicago, founding the Garrett Bible Institute and contributing to the education of women.

== Early life ==
Born in 1805 on a farm close to the town of Newburgh in New York state, Clark was from a devout family. At age 20, she married Augustus Garrett, and the couple's daughter Imogene was born in 1830. Departing New York, the Garretts lived in Cincinnati for a time, but had to flee the city after getting in debt. Moving to New Orleans, the couple's young daughter died of cholera in 1833 and was buried on the banks of the Mississippi. Garrett gave birth to a second child, a son named Charles, in 1834. The Garrets also had another son, John.

== Move to Chicago ==
Facing difficulties in New Orleans as well, the Garretts separated for a short while—Augustus to Chicago, while Eliza returned to Newburgh. Reuniting in 1835 in Chicago, the couple worked in real estate and prospered. Augustus eventually was elected mayor of Chicago twice. Eliza became a prominent member of the Clark Street Methodist Episcopal Church. Through her association with the Church, Garrett became aware of the lacking educational facilities for Methodist clergy in the region.

== Later life ==
In 1848, Garrett's husband Augustus died after a short, sudden illness. Inheriting a considerable portion of his fortune, Garrett became determined to establish a biblical institute and opportunities for women's education in the young city. Despite having to make considerable payments of her husband's debts, Garrett was able to found the North Western Female College, a preparatory school for girls, in 1854.

Garrett's desire to create a biblical institute became a controversy within the Methodist Church's upper ranks, due to a view held by some at the time that a surplus of education would degrade the holiness of the clergy. However, her considerable financial support overcame hesitation in the organization. On January 1, 1855, the Garrett Bible Institute was founded north of the city, in Evanston. Garrett, along with others, rode to the site on sleighs to celebrate.

However, despite still being a relatively young woman, Garrett fell ill the following November, suffering from bilious colic. She died on November 24, 1855, at age 50. Her funeral, at Rosehill Cemetery, was described by the Northwestern Christian Advocate newspaper as "one of the longest that ever moved from our city."
