= Saint Paul School of Theology =

United Methodist seminary in Kansas, U.S.

- Type: Private seminary
- Established: 1956
- Religious affiliation: United Methodist Church
- Academic affiliations: Oklahoma City University
- Students: 100
- Location: Leawood, Kansas, United States; 38°55′55″N 94°38′09″W
- Campus: Suburban community
- Website: www.spst.edu

Saint Paul School of Theology (SPST) is a United Methodist seminary in Leawood, Kansas, United States. In addition to the Kansas City area campus at Church of the Resurrection, Saint Paul School of Theology at Oklahoma City University has been offering courses since September 2008. The Oklahoma campus works in a collaboration with Oklahoma City University in Oklahoma City, Oklahoma. Additionally, the Kansas Campus works in partnership with the United Methodist Church of the Resurrection to serve the Greater Kansas City Metro Area in Leawood, KS. The student body has almost equal numbers of men and women, representing many states and other countries. While most students are United Methodist, several other denominations are represented in the student body each year.

== History ==
Saint Paul School of Theology was one of two schools authorized by the 1956 General Conference of the Methodist Church. Due to the shortage of Methodist pastors in the Midwest, Kansas City was selected as the location. The seminary was chartered in 1958, and the first group of fifty students began classes in 1959.

== Academics ==
Saint Paul School of Theology is focused on both intellectual pursuits and practical applications. Learning at Saint Paul takes place in the classroom, in the church and pulpit, and in the real world. The curriculum combines academic study and experience and serves as a model for other seminaries across the country and around the world.

In 2021, tuition cost is $29,866 per year and enrollment averages to be about 100 students total.

The school offers the Master of Divinity, Master of Arts, and Doctor of Ministry degrees. If also offers continuing education and a Deacon Studies program.

Saint Paul School of Theology (SPST) is accredited by the Association of Theological Schools and the Higher Learning Commission. It is approved for listing by the University Senate of The United Methodist Church as one of thirteen United Methodist seminaries in the country. The school is also a member of the Kansas City Association of Theological Schools, a cooperative venture in theological education that includes Central Baptist Theological Seminary, Midwestern Baptist Theological Seminary, and Nazarene Theological Seminary.
