= Charles Wesley Brashares =

American bishop

Charles Wesley Brashares (1891–1982) was an American bishop of The Methodist Church and the United Methodist Church, elected in 1944.

Charles was born 31 March 1891 in Williamsport, Ohio, the son of Isaiah Mark and Clara Emma (McBroom) Brashares. Charles married Julia Estelle Merrill 20 December 1916. They had the following children: Charles Merrill, Wesley Emerson and Robert Mark. Wesley followed his father into ordained ministry, becoming a pastor in the Northwest Indiana Annual Conference of The Methodist Church. He then became the editor of the Hoosier Methodist newspaper. Charles Wesley Brashares earned the A.B. degree from Ohio Wesleyan University in 1914. He then earned the S.T.B. degree from the Boston University School of Theology in 1917. He did further graduate study at Harvard University and Boston University, 1917–18.

Charles Wesley Brashares was ordained elder and became a Member in Full Connection of the Maine Annual Conference of the Methodist Episcopal Church in 1917. He served the following appointments as pastor: the Orient Heights Methodist Church in East Boston, 1916–18; Gorham, Maine, 1918–20; Newton, Massachusetts 1920–22; the Grace Methodist Church in Dayton, Ohio, 1922–34; and First Methodist Church in Ann Arbor, Michigan, 1934–44.

The Rev. Dr. Charles Wesley Brashares was elected to the episcopacy of The Methodist Church by the 1944 North Central Jurisdictional Conference. He was assigned the Des Moines episcopal area. His offices were at 302 Old Colony Building, Des Moines, Iowa. In 1952 he became resident bishop of the Chicago Area.

Brashares received a number of honorary degrees. In 1927 Ohio Wesleyan University conferred upon Rev. Brashares the degree Doctor of Divinity. Bishop Brashares received the LL.D. degree in 1945 from Cornell College. Boston University awarded the LL.D. in 1948. Simpson College gave the Doctor of Humane Letters in 1950. And Iowa Wesleyan College conferred the Doctor of Litt. in 1951.

== See also ==
- List of bishops of the United Methodist Church
