= Methodist Theological School in Ohio =

American seminary

The Methodist Theological School in Ohio
- Other names: MTSO, Methesco
- Type: Private
- Established: 1956
- Affiliations: United Methodist Church
- President: Jay Rundell, M.Div.
- Faculty: 18 Full-Time / 5 Part-Time
- Administrative staff: 24
- Students: 103 FTE
- Location: Delaware, Ohio, United States; 40°15′13″N 83°03′36″W
- Campus: Suburban, 70 acres
- Website: www.mtso.edu

The Methodist Theological School in Ohio (MTSO) is a graduate theological school and seminary in Delaware, Ohio. MTSO is one of the 13 official seminaries of The United Methodist Church.

MTSO is accredited by the North Central Association of Colleges and Schools of The Higher Learning Commission and is also accredited the Association of Theological Schools in the United States and Canada to provide post-baccalaureate professional and academic degree programs to educate persons for the practice of ministry and for teaching and research in the theological disciplines.

In addition to The United Methodist Church, MTSO students represent over a dozen faith traditions.

== History ==
In April 1958, 48 members of the Provisional Organization for the Establishment of The Methodist Theological School in Ohio signed a document laying the groundwork for the construction of a new educational institution on 70 hillside acres in Central Ohio.

In 1959, $4 million had been raised for the project. In 1960 the first classes met on the new campus.

Rev. John W. Dickhaut was named as the first president of MTSO and Van Bogard Dunn was appointed as the first academic dean. Dickhaut served as president for 22 years. In 1963, the first graduating class of MTSO was all-male and included one African-American graduate. The first female graduated from MTSO in 1964.

During the 1960s, MTSO established a legacy of focus on issues relating to social justice. Many of the faculty and students protested racial discrimination in the United States during these years. In 1973, MTSO joined Trinity Lutheran Seminary and the Pontifical College Josephinum to form the Theological Consortium of Greater Columbus. In 1981, MTSO named Rev. Buford A. Dickinson as the successor to Dickhaut as the president. Dickinson served for five years and was succeeded by Rev. Dr. Norman E. "Ned" Dewire, who would serve for 20 years.

Rev. Jay Rundell was named the fourth president of MTSO on July 1, 2006, and serves as president of the institution. Dr. Valerie Bridgeman is the academic dean.

== Academics ==
MTSO offers studies in multiple disciplines within the field of theological education. These include Biblical Studies, Pastoral Counseling, Historical Studies, Evangelism, Practical Theology, Theological Studies, the Study of Religion, Inter-Religious Relations, and Wesleyan Studies. The primary focus is intersectionality, womanist theological ethics, and womanist hermeneutics.

Students are required to engage in contextual education including field education, supervised internships, clinical pastoral education (CPE) units, and cross-cultural trips.

== Faculty ==
MTSO currently has 18 Full-time and 5 Part-time members of the faculty.

== Governance ==
MTSO is governed by a 19-member board of trustees.

== Campus ==
The MTSO campus is 70 acres (280,000 m^{2}). Facilities on the campus include:

- Alford Centrum
- Burgett Preaching Chapel
- Dewire Residence Hall
- Dickhaut Library
- Dunn Dining Hall
- Gault Hall
- Helen Werner Apartment Building
- Kleist Manor Apartments
- Werner Hall

Outdoor facilities include a chapel, labyrinth, and walking trails. In 2013, MTSO announced a sustainability initiative that will make MTSO's campus more environmentally responsible.

== Academics ==
MTSO offers multiple graduate degrees:

- Master of Divinity (M.Div.)
- Master of Arts in Counseling Ministries (MACM) [Clinical Counseling Track Suspended as of Spring 2017]
- Master of Theological Studies (MTS)
- Master of Arts in Public Theology (MAPT)
- Master of Arts in Social Justice (MASJ)
- Doctor of Ministry (D.Min.)

The school also offers several non-degree certificate programs.

== Lecture Series ==
- The Schooler Institute on Preaching
- Williams Lectures on Theology

== Notable alumni ==
- Hae-Jong Kim, retired bishop of The United Methodist Church.
- Dagmar Braun Celeste, former first lady of Ohio
- James W. Moore preacher, pastor and author
- John B. Ellington, Jr., Air National Guard Major General
