= History of Emory University =

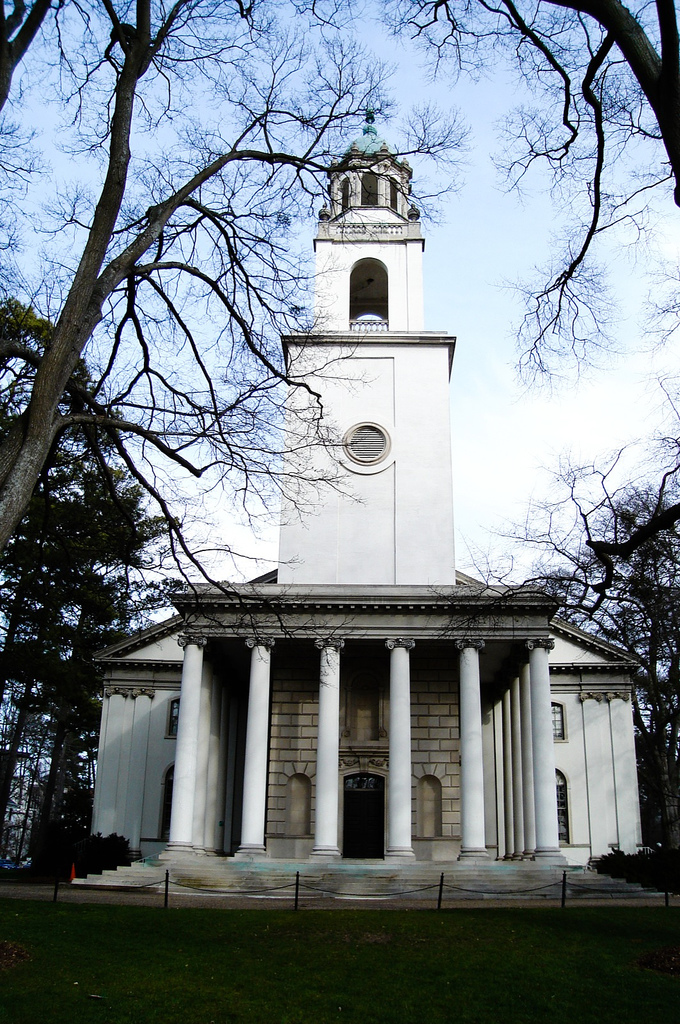
Glenn Memorial United Methodist Church near the main entrance of Emory University

The History of Emory University began in 1836 when a small group of Methodists from Newton County contemplated the establishment of a new town and college. The town was called Oxford after the school's prestigious British cousin, which graduated the two founders of Methodism, John and Charles Wesley. The college was named after John Emory, an American Methodist bishop.

Events preceding the chartering of Emory College began in 1783, when the Georgia State legislature provided for the founding of "a college or seminary of learning." However, general support of education in Georgia was meager until the 1830s, when an educational fad in Germany inspired Georgia Methodists to create a school for manual labor. At the Georgia Methodist Conference in 1834, a preacher known as "Uncle Allen" Turner suggested that Georgia Methodists should develop their own school rather than support Randolph-Macon in Virginia. As a result, the Manual Labor School was created in Covington, Georgia in 1835.

On December 10, 1836, the Georgia General Assembly granted the Georgia Methodist Conference a charter to Emory College, named for John Emory, a popular bishop who had presided at the 1834 conference but had died in a carriage accident in 1835. Two years after the chartering, the college opened its doors, and on September 17, 1838, the college's first president, Ignatius Alphonso Few, and three faculty members welcomed fifteen freshmen and sophomores. Like much of higher education in the American South, Emory was a segregated and whites-only institution at its founding, and would remain so for over a century. Slave labor helped construct the original grounds of the university.

For the duration of the nineteenth century, Emory College was a constricting academic environment. By signing their names into the Matriculation Book, students were bound to obey the "Laws and Statutes of the College", which bound students to their rooms during study hours, and forbade them from leaving the town limits without the president's consent and engaging in immoral activities. Until the presidency of Warren Candler in the 1890s, Emory prohibited intercollegiate sports. He thought the practice "evil, only evil, and that continually", his principle objection being the cost of intercollegiate athletic programs, the temptation of gambling, and the distraction from academics. However, he was not unalterably opposed to athletics, and during his presidency he raised funds for the first gymnasium at Emory and oversaw the creation of the nation's first model intramural program.

Emory College was closed briefly during the Civil War. In the autumn of 1861, every student left to fight, and the college's trustees closed for the duration. During the war, the college's buildings saw duty both as a Confederate hospital and Union headquarters. When Emory reopened in January 1866, the school's library was destroyed and its small endowment was depleted. Only with the aid of a state G.I. Bill could students afford to resume their education.

In the years following the Civil War, Emory, along with the rest of the South, struggled to overcome financial devastation. The first step toward financial stability came in 1880, when Emory President Atticus G. Haygood preached a Thanksgiving Day sermon expressing gratitude for the end of slavery which captured the attention of George Seney, a Brooklyn banker and Methodist. Seney gave Emory College $5,000 to repay its debts, $50,000 for construction, and $75,000 to establish a new endowment. Over the years, Seney invested more than a quarter-million dollars into Emory College, helping to erect the administration building in Oxford that bears his name.

Under the direction of President Haygood, Emory College began to offer many technical and professional subjects in addition to courses required for degrees. By the turn of the century, Emory had evolved its traditional liberal arts program into a broad curriculum encouraging students to pursue degrees in science, study in theology and law, and even learning and expertise in technology and tool craft. The technology department was launched by President Isaac Stiles Hopkins, a polymath professor at Emory College, who was later convinced by state legislators to become the first president of what is now the Georgia Institute of Technology.

The university was in an unincorporated area until the City of Atlanta annexed it in 2018 at the request of the university administration; this was done partly to expedite mass transit links in the future.

== Move to Druid Hills ==
Candler Library

In 1914, after a long struggle between the Vanderbilt University Board of Trust and the bishops of the Methodist Episcopal Church South over control of the university, the Board of Trust won a decision in the Tennessee State Supreme Court. The church subsequently severed its relationship with the university and forged plans to create a new Methodist university in the Southeast with a school of theology. The General Conference decided to charter one university east of the Mississippi River, and one to the river's west (Southern Methodist University).

It was Asa Griggs Candler, the founder of The Coca-Cola Company and brother to former Emory President Warren Candler, who persuaded the church to build the new university in DeKalb County, and to make Emory the nucleus. He endowed the school with one million dollars and a gift of 75 acres (304,000 m²) of land in the newly emerging Druid Hills community, located northeast of downtown Atlanta in DeKalb County. The campus is less than a mile from the current Atlanta city limits. For Candler's generosity, the campus library at the east end of the quadrangle bears his name.

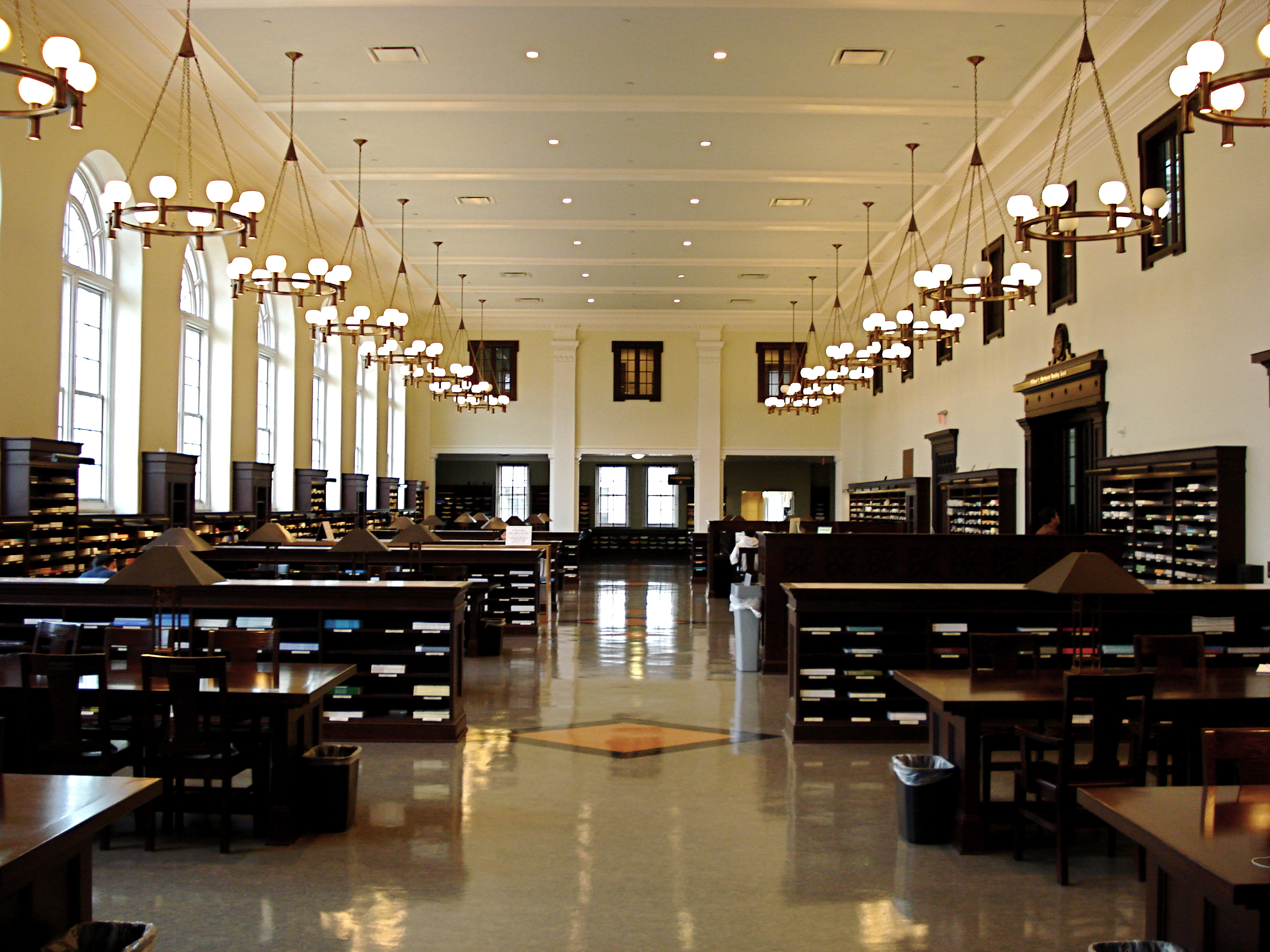
William L. Matheson Current Periodicals Reading Room of the Candler Library

In light of these developments, Emory College was rechartered by DeKalb County on January 25, 1915, as Emory University. Within three months of Candler's endowment, in September 1914, the first school within the university—the Candler School of Theology—had begun classes. Henry Hornbostel was chosen to as the primary architect to design many of the buildings on Emory University's new campus. His designs incorporated local stone and materials, including marble and red terracotta tile, which established the institution's unique architectural character. By September 1919, Emory University had created a school of law, medicine, business, and graduate studies. The Nell Hodgson Woodruff School of Nursing and Emory University School of Dentistry (closed 1992) would be formed in 1905 and 1944 respectively. Doctoral studies at Emory University were established in 1946, and the school has continued to strengthen its graduate and professional schools since. In 1949, Alben Barkley returned to Emory to receive an honorary LLD degree and give the commencement address, the first Emory event to be televised. The University's newest school, the Rollins School of Public Health, formed in 1990.

== Emory Junior College at Valdosta ==
Plans for an additional campus in Valdosta, Georgia began to be developed in the mid-1920s, when that town's leaders offered Emory 43 acres (17 ha) of land; a distinctive, white-columned building that housed classrooms and administrative offices; and a $200,000 endowment.

In 1928 the Emory Junior College at Valdosta was founded, welcoming its first class of fifty freshman in September of that year. Two years later, sixteen students made up the first graduating class. In 1931, the college completed construction of its first dormitory, allowing students to live on-campus rather than at local inns and family homes.

During World War II enrollment plummeted as students left to join the military. Emory administrators decided to close the campus for the remainder of the war, but when Valdosta leaders objected, they compromised by moving the remaining students and faculty to the DeKalb County campus. The school reopened in 1946, and, due to the G.I. Bill and an aggressive recruiting drive, managed a record enrollment of 247. Additional classrooms and dorms were brought from a nearby Air Force base to help adjust to the increase.

When the Georgia State Women's college (now Valdosta State University) began to admit men in 1950, the Valdosta campus's fate was sealed. By 1953, just 65 students were enrolled. Emory could not compete with the lower in-state tuition offered by Valdosta State, especially without the support system enjoyed by the larger DeKalb County campus. When the junior college closed its doors in 1953, the facilities were given to the University System of Georgia and are now also part of Valdosta State.

== World War II ==
During World War II, Emory was one of 131 colleges and universities nationally that took part in the V-12 Navy College Training Program which offered students a path to a Navy commission.

== Post-1950s Expansion ==
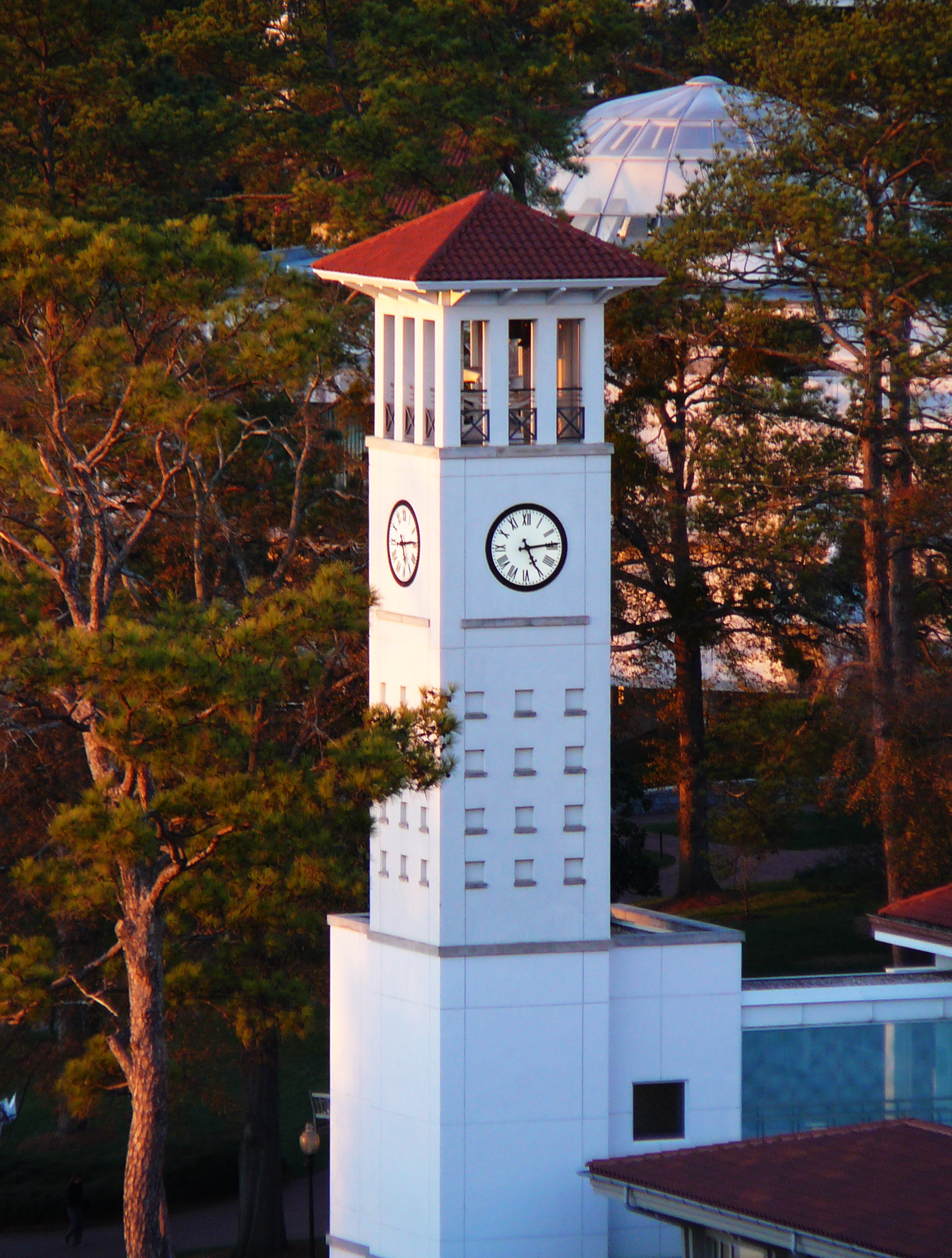
Clock tower at Cox Hall

Formerly an all-male school, Emory officially became a coeducational institution in 1953. Although it had previously admitted women under limited circumstances, the university had never before had a policy through which they could enroll in large numbers and as resident students. Shortly after, in 1959, sororities first appeared on campus. In 1962, in the midst of the American Civil Rights Movement, Emory embraced the initiative to end racial restrictions when it asked the courts to declare portions of the Georgia statutes unconstitutional. Previously, Georgia law denied tax-exempt status to private universities with racially integrated student bodies. The Supreme Court of Georgia ruled in Emory's favor. Emory officially became racially integrated in 1963.

In the 1970s, the university embarked on an ambitious building program, substantially improving its facilities. Due largely to the generosity of Robert W. Woodruff, the president of The Coca-Cola Company, the U.S. Center for Disease Control opened on Clifton Road, next to Emory. During this time, the university also built a series of new concrete brutalist structures, including the Robert W. Woodruff Library in 1969, the Sanford S. Atwood Chemistry Center in 1974, Goodrich C. White Hall in 1977, and the Paul Rudolph-designed William R. Cannon Chapel in 1982.

The course of Emory's history changed dramatically when, in November 1979, Robert and George Woodruff presented the institution with a gift of $105 million in Coca-Cola stock. At the time this was the largest single gift to any institution of higher education in American history, and it made a profound impact on Emory's direction in the next two decades

Another important factor in the university's growth over the last two decades has been its location in metropolitan Atlanta. The 740-acre (3.0 km^{2}) Emory campus in the historic Druid Hills neighborhood shares the Clifton Corridor with the U.S. Centers for Disease Control and Prevention and the American Cancer Society. A few miles away is the Carter Center. Former U.S. president Jimmy Carter, winner of the 2002 Nobel Peace Prize, is a University Distinguished Professor and occasionally visits classes and lectures students. Each year, Carter has a town hall meeting at the university, in which he gives a lecture and answers questions from Emory students and members of the Atlanta community.

The latest additions to the Emory campus include the R. Randall Rollins Building of the Rollins School of Public Health, the Emory Student Center, two Health Sciences Research Buildings, a new 10-floor tower of the Emory University Hospital, and four first-year dormitories.

Emory in autumn

Emory's libraries have seen enormous growth over the 1990s as they increased their holdings to more than 3.1 million volumes. The Special Collections Department of Woodruff Library houses the papers of the British poet Ted Hughes, as well as an extensive Irish collection (William Butler Yeats, Lady Gregory, Maud Gonne, Seamus Heaney, and several contemporary Irish writers). Emory's Special Collections also has concentrations on southern imprints and writers (James Dickey, Alfred Uhry, Mary Hood, and certain papers of Huey Long, for example), and a growing concentration of African American papers, including the work of activist Malcolm X and the Hatch/Billops Collection. Recently, author Salman Rushdie, who has joined the faculty as a Distinguished Writer in Residence, announced he will donate his extensive archive to Woodruff Library.

The Michael C. Carlos Museum houses a permanent collection of some 18,000 objects, including art from Egypt, Greece, Rome, the Near East, the Americas, Asia, Africa, and Oceania as well as European and American prints and drawings ranging from the Middle Ages to the twentieth century. Twenty-nine galleries are maintained for permanent collections, and eight galleries present special exhibitions from all periods.

Emory has received four of the 100 largest donations in higher education history. Emory is the only university with two donations among the fifteen largest in higher education history. These records are tracked by the Chronicle of Higher Education. Many of these donations stemmed from the school's close ties to the Coca-Cola Company.

The largest donation to Emory was for $295 million, received in 1996 from the Lettie Pate Evans, Joseph B. Whitehead, and Robert W. Woodruff Foundations. Other large donations include:

- $50 million: July 9, 2007. From the O. Wayne Rollins Foundation and Grace Crum Rollins to the Rollins School of Public Health to double its physical space and attract new faculty.
- $83.3 million: 1999. From the estates of W.I.H. and Lula Pitts.
- $109 million (the largest gift in higher education history at the time): 1979. From the Robert W. Woodruff Foundation. Established the Emory Scholars Program and facilitated Emory's rise in national prominence.
- $261.5 million: Nov. 16, 2006. From the Robert W. Woodruff Foundation to overhaul the Emory Clinic, renovate the Woodruff Health Sciences Center Administration Building, and facilitate Emory's Strategic Plan.

Emory University celebrated its sesquicentennial anniversary in 1986, when it featured a student body of about 8,500 undergraduate and graduate students. In 2024, Emory University's endowment was ranked 17th in the nation at an estimated $11.044 billion.

Emory University completed a strategic planning process in 2005 led by Emory President James W. Wagner, Provost Earl Lewis and Executive Vice President Mike Mandl in collaboration with the Baltimore-based Ayers Saint Gross. After broad consultation with the entire Emory community, the comprehensive plan was put forward and approved by the Board of Trustees. The anticipated $3 billion plan will strengthen Emory University's programs in specific areas focused on key themes centered on major world issues.

On November 16, 2006, the Robert W. Woodruff Foundation announced that it would give Emory $261.5 million over four years to enhance the Emory Clinic, establish a Presidential Fund to provide seed money for the strategic plan, and to renovate the Woodruff Health Sciences Administration Building.

On September 15, 2008, The Emory Wheel reported that the Emory Board of Trustees had officially changed the name of Emory College to College of Arts and Sciences and the name of the Graduate School of Arts and Sciences to the James T. Laney School of Graduate Studies. The former ends the founding Emory College name after 172 years.

== 175th Anniversary ==
Emory celebrated its 175th anniversary in 2011. A university committee identified a list of 175 notable people for the occasion. A daily almanac features highlights from Emory's history.

== 2018 annexation into Atlanta ==
Prior to 2018 the campus was in an unincorporated area, statistically counted in the Druid Hills census-designated place. In 2016 Mark Niesse of The Atlanta Journal-Constitution wrote that the general public outside of Atlanta held the assumption that the university was in the city, and the university stated in a press release that year that "Emory already promotes its location as Atlanta, is known internationally as being located in Atlanta, routinely recruits faculty and students to Atlanta, and has an Atlanta address and zip code".

In 2016 the university stated that it intended to petition to be annexed into the City of Atlanta; in 2017 the university leadership formally submitted its petition. One factor that the annexation could have is expediting the construction of a MARTA line that serves the university since Atlanta sales taxes would now be collected in the annexed area.

To comply with the requirement that an annexed area be adjacent to the existing city limits, the university purchased a residence partially within the then-city limits. The residence had a price of $345,000, and the property had 1,240 square feet (115 m^{2}) of space. The residence is the only area connecting the university property with the rest of the city.

The city government also entered into a settlement with the DeKalb County government to settle a dispute, paving the way for the annexation. Due to the taxable revenue involved, there was a dispute over whether the area would remain in the DeKalb County School District or transition to Atlanta Public Schools. The area ultimately went to APS, and as part of a 2019 settlement Emory would help establish school-based clinics for DeKalb schools. The City of Atlanta annexed Emory's campus effective January 1, 2018, a part of its largest annexation within a period of 65 years; the Atlanta City Council voted to do so the prior December.
