= Linus Parker =

American Methodist bishop (1829–1885)

Linus Parker (23 April 1829 – 5 March 1885) was a bishop of the Methodist Episcopal Church, South, elected in 1882.

== Birth and family ==
Linus was born on a farm near Vienna, Oneida County, New York. He married Sarah E.F. Sale in 1853. She died of yellow fever September 13, 1855. Her tombstone still stands in Lewisberg, Louisiana. After five years Linus married a second time, to Ellen K. Burruss. They had three sons, one of whom later became Dean of the Candler School of Theology, Franklin N. Parker.

== Young manhood and military service ==
Linus worked for an older brother in a store in New Orleans in 1845. During this time, he studied Latin and Greek before daylight in the morning and after his return from business in the evening. In 1846 he served as a soldier in the Mexican–American War. After that he began the study of law, but was convinced to enter the Methodist ministry.

== Ordained ministry ==
During March 1849 Linus served as a Supply Pastor for the church on Algiers Street. He was Licensed to Preach in May of that year. He joined the Louisiana Annual Conference, becoming an ordained elder in 1853.

Rev. Parker served the following appointments, all in Louisiana: Lake Providence (1849), Shreveport (1850–51), Felicity Street, New Orleans (1852–54), Carondelet Street, New Orleans (1855–57), Presiding Elder of the New Orleans District (1858), Felicity Street again (1859–61), Shreveport again (1862–63), the Caldo Circuit (1864–65), and Felicity Street a third time (1866–69).

Rev. Parker then became the editor of the Christian Advocate (1870–81). He also was elected a delegate to General Conferences in 1866, 1874, 1874 and 1882.

== Episcopal ministry ==
Linus Parker was elected to the episcopacy in 1882. As bishop he gave episcopal supervision to the Texas, Missouri, North Carolina, Mississippi and Maryland annual conferences.

Bishop Parker died of an apparent cerebral hemorrhage on 5 March 1885 in New Orleans.

== Publications ==
- C. B. Galloway, Linus Parker: His Life and writings (Nashville, 1886)

== See also ==
- List of bishops of the United Methodist Church
