= Plato T. Durham =

American academic administrator

1st Dean of the Candler School of Theology
- In office September 23, 1914 – November 1918
- Succeeded by: Franklin Nutting Parker

Personal details
- Born: September 9, 1873 Shelby, North Carolina
- Died: February 10, 1930 (aged 56) Atlanta, Georgia

Plato Tracy Durham (September 9, 1873 - February 10, 1930) was the first dean of the Candler School of Theology at Emory University, serving from 1914 to 1918.

== Background ==
Plato Tracy Durham was born on September 9, 1873, in Shelby, North Carolina. He was the son of Captain Plato Durham of North Carolina and Nora Tracy Durham Dixon, daughter of James Wright Tracy. Durham was the stepson of a Methodist minister and the grandchild of a Methodist minister and was well trained in the workings of the church.

== Candler ==
Durham was selected Dean of Candler in the summer of 1914, when Chancellor Warren A. Candler convinced Emory College to begin a school of theology subsequent the loss of Vanderbilt by the Methodist Episcopal Church, South. Candler School of Theology opened for classes on September 23, 1914. There were immediate criticisms of the school, chiefly that the faculty was too liberal.

During the Durham administration, the dean became an integral part of the administration of the University and in fact, Chancellor Candler considered Dean Durham his closest assistant, administering the University whenever Chancellor Candler's episcopal duties pulled him away from the campus.

In 1914, Candler was housed in Wesley Memorial church. When the Druid Hills campus was opened in the fall of 1916, Durham oversaw the move into the new building. The chapel in the Theology building was named after Dean Durham and is currently the reading room in Pitts Library. Under Dean Durham's guidance, the theological pattern at the school conformed to the prevailing patterns at the time, with the focus of study being on Biblical studies.

Durham was an "idealist, a dreamer, and a mystic." However, he was not an administrator. Led by Professor Andrew Sledd, the faculty rose up in revolt and Dean Durham retired in November 1918. He died in Atlanta on February 10, 1930.
