= Charles Betts Galloway =

American Methodist Episcopal bishop

Charles Betts Galloway DD
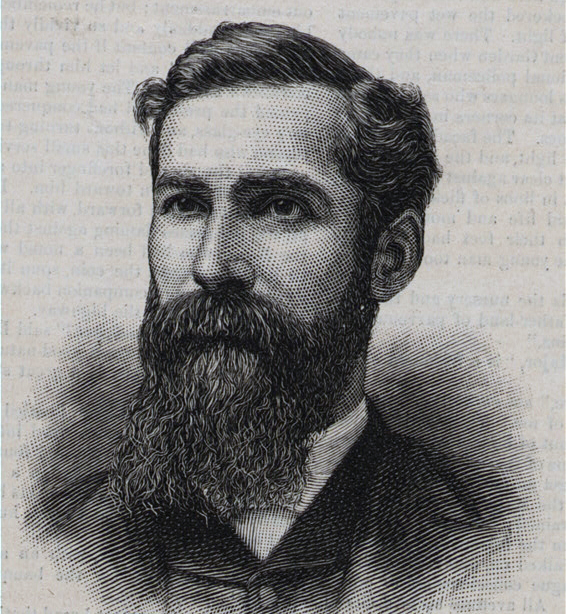

Bishop

Methodist Episcopal Church, South
- In office 1886–1909

Personal details
- Born: Charles Betts Galloway; September 1, 1849 Kosciusko, Mississippi, US
- Died: May 12, 1909 (aged 59) Jackson, Mississippi, US
- Resting place: Greenwood Cemetery, Jackson, Mississippi, US
- Education: University of Mississippi
- Occupation: Clergyman

Charles Betts Galloway Jr. (September 1, 1849 – May 12, 1909) was an American Bishop of the Methodist Episcopal Church, South, elected in 1886. In his day, he was "the best-known and most influential personality in the Methodist world." He was also instrumental in the formation of Millsaps College.

== Early life ==
Galloway was born in Kosciusko, Mississippi. His parents were Elizabeth Adelaide (née Dinkins) and Charles Betts Galloway, a successful doctor. He was their second child and oldest son. Galloway was eleven when the Civil War began; he recalled watching the soldiers leaving and made a bayonet from his knife as he was "determined to carve in pieces any Yankee who dared invade the soil of Mississippi."

When he was fourteen, the family moved to Canton, Mississippi because it provided better opportunities for his father's medical practice. He attended public school before going to the University of Mississippi on January 3, 1866. Sixteen-year-old Galloway enrolled directly into the sophomore class was probably the youngest student; more than half of his 24 classmates had fought in the Civil War. One of his classmates recalled, "Galloway was in the front rank of his class…" He also joined the social and literary Fraternity of Delta Psi (St. Anthony Hall).

His first semester, Galloway attended a prayer meeting held in a classmate's room that significantly changed his perspective on religion. When at home In Canton, Galloway talked to his pastor at the Methodist Church and decided to become a minister. He continued his studies, graduating in June 1868.

== Career ==
Immediately after graduation in June, Galloway was licensed to preach with the Methodist Episcopal Church, South. However, the next session when he could be ordained was not until December, so he accepted a position at Sharon College, teaching young men in preparatory department and overseeing the pastoral.

At the church's Mississippi Annual Conference December 8-15, 1868, Galloway became a deacon of the Methodist Episcopal Church. The church assigned him to its Black Hawk Circuit of the Yazoo District. One newspaper wrote, "Although only 18 years of age, his powers as an orator and preacher made him instantly famous." In 1871, he was ordained an elder and appointed to South Warren in the Vicksburg District. However, Galloway ended up getting sent to Canton to fill an emergency vacancy, returning to South Warren at the end of the year. He was officially assigned to Canton from 1872 to 1873. At the Conference in December 1873, he was appointed to the church in Jackson where he remained for four years. In 1877, he was assigned to the Crawford Street Methodist Church in Vicksburg, also for four years. While in Vicksburg, Galloway became an advocate of the temperance movement.

In 1881, Galloway returned to the church in Jackson. At the church's General Conference in Nashville, Tennessee in May 1882, he was elected editor of the New Orleans Christian Advocate, a weekly newspaper sponsored by Methodist conferences in Alabama, Arkansas, Louisiana, and Mississippi. This editorial work was in addition to his job with the church in Jackson. In 1884, he was given a "lighter" assignment with the church in Brookhaven which was also closer to the newspaper's headquarters in New Orleans, reducing his time traveling . This allowed Galloway to focus more of the Advocate, bringing his unique analysis of "questions which involved the moral and religious life in the country…." He not only wrote about church affairs, but also about politics, religion, travel, and State affairs. During this time, he also wrote two books: The Prohibition Handbook and a biography of Bishop Linus Parker. He also was invited to speak before the Mississippi Press Association on May 15, 1884.

Galloway served as editor of the New Orleans Christian Advocate from June 1882 to May 1886. When he was 36 years old in May 1886, Galloway was elected to be a Bishop in the Methodist Episcopal Church, South. In that capacity, he convened an Indian Mission Conference in the Eufaula, Indian Territory (now Oklahoma) on October 20-25, 1886; in December of that year he also held annual conferences in Arkansas and Texas. He returned to Indian Territory in June 1887 for an International Indian Council that included representatives from eighteen tribes. Galloways wrote warmly and respectfully of the tribes, and was impressed with their government. He noted, "The speech by 'Poor Buffalo,' a Kiowa chief, impressed me as no other appeal I ever heard in my life."

During his 23 years as bishop, he presided over 123 annual conferences. He preached across the United States and visited field mission operations in Saudi Arabia, Ceylon (now Sri Lanka), China, Cuba, Egypt, England, France, Greece, Hong Kong, India, Italy, Japan, Jordan, Korea, Mexico, Palestine, and Singapore. Sometimes he spent months in a country or held annual conferences, other times his stay was short—but he would always visit any mission in the area, regardless of denomination. As he traveled, he wrote letters that were published and widely read back in the United States.

As a bishop, Galloway also preached to African-Americans whenever he could. After overseeing the dedication of a new black church on a former plantation, he wrote an appeal for whites to financially support the construction of churches and schools for blacks. Although he also called for whites to teach in the black schools, Galloway believed in separatism.

== Academic institutions ==
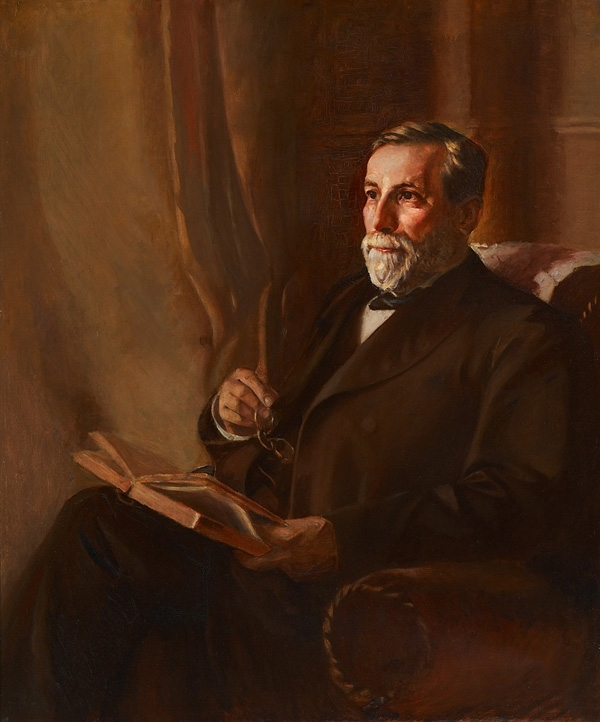
Portrait of Charles Betts Galloway

Perhaps because of his conversion at college, one of his platforms as bishop was the importance of required religious education in colleges. In 1889, Galloway made the motion at an annual conference for the church to create a new college called Millsaps. Reuben Webster Millsaps offered land and a challenge gift of $50,000 to establish a Methodist college for men in Jackson, Mississippi; Galloway raised the matching $50,000. Galloway became president of the Board of Trustees of Millsaps College for the rest of his life.

Around 1900, Galloway became chairman of the Board of Education of the Methodist Episcopal Church, South. When Methodists in Arkansas expressed an interest in starting a church-run college for women, Galloway fully endorse the project—the result was Galloway College. He was also an effective advocate for the establishment of Hendrix College and Henderson-Brown College, both also in Arkansas.

Later, he was president of the board of trustees for Vanderbilt University. He also served on the board of the John F. Slater Fund, a scholarship fund for African Americans

== Honors ==
- June 17, 1882, the University of Mississippi gave Galloway an honorary Doctor of Divinity.
- Galloway received an honorary Doctor of Laws from Northwestern University in 1894, and from Tulane University in 1904.
- In 1889, a Methodist women's college was dedicated in his honor. Galloway College in Arkansas operated under that name until it merged with Hendrix College in 1933.
- Hendrix College in Conway, Arkansas named a women's dormitory in his honor.
- The day of his funeral, all branches of federal, state, county, and local government in Mississippi remained closed.
- In Jackson, Mississippi, Galloway Elementary School and Galloway Memorial Church were both named in his honor.

== Publications ==
- The Prohibition Handbook: Specially Designed for Circulation in the State of Mississippi (Jackson: Mississippi State Prohibition Executive Committee,1886)
- The Editor-Bishop, Linus Parker, His Life and Writings (Nashville: Publishing House Methodist Episcopal Church, 1886)
- A Circuit of the Globe (Nashville: Publishing House Methodist Episcopal Church, South,1895)
- Modern Missions: Their Evidential Value (Nashville: Publishing House Methodist Episcopal Church, South, 1896)
- Eminent Methodists: Twelve Booklets in One Book (Nashville: Publishing House Methodist Episcopal Church, South,1897)
- Christianity in the American Commonwealth or, The Influence of Christianity in Making this Nation (Nashville: Publishing House Methodist Episcopal Church, South, 1898)
- The South and the Negro: An Address Delivered at the Seventh Annual Conference for Education in the South, Birmingham, Ala., April 26th, 1904 (New York: Southern Education Board, 1904)
- "Jefferson Davis, a Judicial Estimate; Address Delivered by Bishop Charles B. Galloway at the University of Mississippi, June 3, 1908". (Bulletin of the University of Mississippi, Series VI, Supplement to No. 3, 1908)
- Great Men and Great Movements: A Volume of Addresses (Nashville: Publishing House Methodist Episcopal Church, South, 1914)

== Personal ==
Galloway became engaged to his future wife, Harriet E. Willis when they were thirteen and fourteen. However, they did not marry until September 1, 1869, on his 20th birthday. They had a son, E. S. Galloway, who attended Millsaps Collage and became a doctor in Jackson; he was also Secretary of the Mississippi State Board of Health.

When he became bishop, Galloway had offers from communities across the South, but he established Jackson as his home base in 1889. On his second trip to Asia, eight years after his first trip in 1894, Galloway took his wife with him. He wrote, "To be separated by eight thousand miles from a treasure so sacred has already caused many an aching heartthrob."

Galloway gave the commencement speech at the University of Mississippi on June 3, 1911—it was also the 100th anniversary of Jefferson Davis' birth. He closed his speech with, "Soldier, hero, statesman, gentleman, American, prince of Christian chivalry, the uncrowned Chief of an invisible republic of loving and loyal hearts, when another hundred years have passed, no intelligent voice will fail to praise him and no patriotic hand will refuse to place a laurel wreath on his radiant brow."

In 1909, Galloway died of pneumonia and a heart condition at his home in Jackson, Mississippi. He had also been ill with Bright's disease. He was buried in Greenwood Cemetery following a service at First Methodist Church in Jackson. Bishop Warren A. Candler of Georgia conducted the service.

Galloway's younger brother, James, also became a Methodist Episcopal pastor.

== Additional resources ==
- Leete, Frederick DeLand (1948) Methodist Bishops. Nashville, The Parthenon Press.
