= Arthur Armstrong =

Arthur Armstrong may refer to:

- Arthur Armstrong (painter) (1924–1996), painter from Northern Ireland
- Tommy Armstrong (New Zealand politician) (Arthur Ernest Armstrong, 1902–1980), New Zealand politician
- Arthur James Armstrong (1924–2018), American bishop of the United Methodist Church
