= Plato Durham =

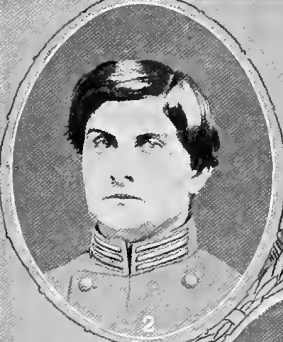
- Portrait of Durham in Confederate uniform

Member of the North Carolina General Assembly
- In office 1866–1870

Personal details
- Born: September 20, 1840 High Shoals, North Carolina, United States
- Died: November 9, 1875 (aged 35) Shelby, North Carolina, United States
- Party: Conservative (c. 1868); Democratic
- Other political affiliations: Ku Klux Klan
- Spouse: Nora Catherine Tracy
- Relations: John Baxter (uncle)
- Children: 5, including Plato Tracy and Robert Lee
- Parents: Micajah Durham (father); Esther Baxter Durham (mother)
- Education: University of North Carolina School of Law
- Profession: Lawyer, politician
- Known for: 1868 North Carolina constitutional convention member; leading Ku Klux Klan member in Cleveland County

Military service
- Allegiance: Confederate States
- Years of service: 1861–1865
- Rank: Captain
- Unit: Company E, 12th North Carolina Infantry
- Battles/wars: American Civil War; Battle of Fredericksburg; Battle of Gettysburg; Battle of Spotsylvania; Battle of Appomattox Court House

Plato Durham (September 20, 1840 – November 9, 1875) was an American lawyer, soldier, and politician. Raised on his father's farm in High Shoals, North Carolina, he studied law before joining the Confederate States Army following the outbreak of the American Civil War. Rising to the rank of captain, he fought in several battles before surrendering at Appomattox Courthouse. He completed his education after the war and opened a successful legal practice in Shelby. Involving himself in politics, he served in the North Carolina General Assembly and was a leader among the small contingent of Conservative delegates at the state's 1868 constitutional convention. He joined the Ku Klux Klan and was arrested for Klan-related activities by federal authorities in 1871 but never tried. He spent much of his time thereafter advocating for accused Klansmen, providing them with bail funds and legal defense, and pursuing clemency. Increasingly isolated from the rest of the state's Conservative Party, he mounted an unsuccessful congressional campaign in 1874 and served as a delegate to the state's 1875 constitutional convention before dying from pneumonia shortly thereafter.

== Early life ==
Plato Durham was born on September 20, 1840 in High Shoals, North Carolina to Micajah and Esther Baxter Durham. He was the fourth of 13 children. He was raised on his father's farm in High Shoals. Educated in public schools in his youth, he read law in Rutherfordton when he was 18 years of age before moving to Knoxville, Tennessee to continue his studies under his uncle, Judge John Baxter.

Upon the outbreak of the American Civil War, Durham enlisted in a Confederate States Army unit in Knoxville. He subsequently returned to North Carolina and joined a unit raised in Cleveland County, Company E, 12th North Carolina Infantry. On November 1, 1862, he was elected third lieutenant. He was later promoted to the rank of captain. He fought in the battles of Fredericksburg, Gettysburg, and Spotsylvania. He surrendered at Appomattox Courthouse. His father and two brothers also fought in the war and were killed. On April 9, 1868, he married Nora Catherine Tracy. The two had five children, including Plato Tracy and Robert Lee.

== Career ==
Following the Civil War, Durham read law at Richmond Hill Law School before enrolling at the University of North Carolina School of Law, where he studied from 1866 to 1867. He was admitted to the bar in Shelby in August 1866 and ran a successful legal practice.

Ideologically, Durham emerged from his service during the Civil War, in the words of historian Allen W. Trelease, "with a wholehearted dedication to the Lost Cause". He was elected to the North Carolina General Assembly in 1866, representing Cleveland County.

Durham served as a delegate to North Carolina's 1868 constitutional convention. The convention was convened from January 14 to March 16, 1868. He served on the body's Committee on Suffrage and Eligibility to Office. Durham, along with John W. Graham, provided leadership to the small contingent of Conservative delegates. Durham tried twice to move resolutions which favored blanket re-enfranchisement of Confederate veterans without success. He made motions to require pre-war citizenship of North Carolina for candidates seeking the office of governor or lieutenant governor, bar blacks from being legal guardians of white children, and constitutionally require racial segregation in public education, but was defeated.

Durham was subsequently re-elected to the General Assembly, serving through 1870. Following the emergence of a widespread corruption scandal concerning state bonds and subsidies of railways in 1869, Durham convinced the House of Representatives to assemble a commission to go to New York City to investigate fraudulent dealings on the bond market. The House later repealed this measure. When businessman Milton S. Littlefield, one of the leading figures in the scandal, appeared in Raleigh in March 1870 to testify before an investigative committee, Durham moved to require him to disclose the names of every legislator he had issued loans to, but the House quashed his proposal. Despite his concern with the railroad lobbying, Durham supported state aid to the Western North Carolina Railroad, which, while heavily implicated in the scandal, ran through his constituency.

Durham ran for North Carolina's 7th congressional district seat in the U.S. House of Representatives in 1868 on a Democratic Party ticket. Initial results suggested he had won over his opponent, Republican Alexander H. Jones, by 18 votes, but Second Military District Governor Edward Canby invalidated the results on grounds of electoral fraud. Jones prevailed by one vote in a new contest three months later.

Durham was called to testify before the U.S. Congress on August 2, 1871 about the Ku Klux Klan. He admitted in his testimony that he joined the Klan in late 1868 or early 1869, characterizing it as "an organization for mutual protection and defense" against armed blacks. He stated that fellow Confederate veteran Leroy McAfee was the official Klan leader in Cleveland County, though several other accounts named him as the local leader. According to librarian J. Timothy Cole, while McAfee may have been the titular head of the local Klan, Durham proved its most influential figure. He was arrested by federal authorities for involvement in a Klan attack on Aaron Biggerstaff in 1871 but never tried. (Note: While several Cleveland County Klan leaders were indicted, none were ever tried. Librarian J. Timothy Cole wrote "there is some suggestion" that Durham secured the withdrawal of the case against him from President Ulysses S. Grant for agreeing not to support his opponent, Horace Greeley, in the 1872 United States presidential election. Attorney Marcus Erwin wrote in 1874 that he believed that the prosecution of Durham was suspended because the U.S. Attorney General felt that the "conspiracy" with which Durham was associated had been foiled and thus no further action was required.) He spent much of his time thereafter advocating for accused Klansmen, providing them with bail funds and legal defense, and pursuing clemency. He served as a defense counsel for accused Klansmen tried in Raleigh in September 1871. Journalist Randolph A. Shotwell later recounted that Durham attempted to accumulate money to bribe jurors to vote for the innocence of an accused Klansman.

Durham ran again as a Democratic nominee for North Carolina's 7th congressional district seat in 1870 but was disqualified and withdrew due to his refusal to take the test oath to the Union. In October 1872 he became editor of The Cleaveland Banner, a local newspaper. That year he also denounced the candidacy of Horace Greeley in the 1872 United States presidential election. His denunciation of Republican President Ulysses S. Grant's opponent, as well as his scandalous involvement with the Klan caused him to become increasingly isolated from the rest of the state's Conservative leadership. Upon visiting him in 1873, Shotwell found him "very nervous and irritable" and embittered by "the meanness and ingratitude of politicians." In 1874, Durham again campaigned for the 7th congressional seat, facing off against incumbent Democrat Robert B. Vance as an independent. Vance won by an overwhelming margin. Durham served as Cleveland County's delegate to the state's 1875 constitutional convention. Durham, along with Thomas J. Jarvis, provided leadership to the Democratic delegates, especially in pushing amendments which asserted the General Assembly's dominance over local government.

== Death ==
Durham died from pneumonia on November 9, 1875 at his home in Shelby. A large funeral was held in his honor and several newspapers across the state printed obituaries for him. He was buried in Shelby's Sunset Cemetery. A granite tombstone erected at the initiative of Durham's son Robert describes him with the epitaph, "soldier, lawyer, statesman". A highway historical marker commemorating him was erected in Shelby in 1948.

== Works cited ==
- Beckel, Deborah (2011). Radical Reform: Interracial Politics in Post-Emancipation North Carolina. Charlottesville: University of Virginia Press. ISBN 978-0-8139-3002-2.
- Bernstein, Leonard (October 1949). "The Participation of Negro Delegates in the Constitutional Convention of 1868 in North Carolina". The Journal of Negro History. 34 (4): 391–409. doi:10.2307/2715607. JSTOR 2715607.
- Cheney, John L. Jr., ed. (1981). North Carolina Government, 1585-1979: A Narrative and Statistical History (revised ed.). Raleigh: North Carolina Secretary of State. OCLC 1290270510.
- Cole, J. Timothy (2016). The Forest City Lynching of 1900: Populism, Racism, and White Supremacy in Rutherford County, North Carolina. Jefferson: McFarland. ISBN 978-0-7864-8040-1.
- Evans, William McKee (1995). Ballots and Fence Rails: Reconstruction on the Lower Cape Fear (reprint ed.). Athens: University of Georgia Press. ISBN 0-8203-1731-4.
- Hume, Richard L. (2008). Blacks, Carpetbaggers, and Scalawags : The Constitutional Conventions of Radical Reconstruction. Baton Rouge: Louisiana State University Press. ISBN 9780807148341.
- Olsen, Otto H. (1965). Carpetbagger's Crusade: The Life of Albion Winegar Tourgee. Baltimore: The Johns Hopkins Press. LCCN 65-13522.
- Raper, Horace W. (1985). William W. Holden: North Carolina's Political Enigma. Chapel Hill: University of North Carolina Press. ISBN 0807850608.
