= Robert Lee Durham =

American engineer, teacher and author

- Born: May 4, 1870; Shelby, Cleveland County, North Carolina
- Died: January 1, 1949 (aged 78); Buena Vista, Virginia

Robert Lee Durham (May 4, 1870 – January 1, 1949) was an American engineer, educator, and author. He was the founding principal and president of Southern Seminary Junior College in Buena Vista, Virginia.

== Early life ==
Durham was born in Shelby, Cleveland County, North Carolina on May 4, 1870. His mother was Catherine Durham and his father was Plato Durham, a well-known attorney. His father died five years after his birth. In 1877, his mother married Benjamin Franklin Dixon, a physician, and the family moved to Oxford where he studied at Horner Military School.

In 1891 he graduated with a degree in civil engineering from Trinity College of Randolph County, which was later known as Duke University. Concerned that his increasing financial instability would hinder a career in engineering, he studied law at Trinity College.

== Career ==
In 1892 he enrolled in a private graduate school in Greensboro, North Carolina, and passed the North Carolina Bar Exam by the next year. By 1893, Durham started to specialize in legal matters in Rutherfordton. Durham started taking an interest in politics, after which he served as a delegate to the North Carolina Democratic Committee for four years from 1894 to 1898 and on the stage panel during the 1906 Democratic State Convention. In 1898 he assembled his own company, in Gastonia, of the North Carolina Infantry when the Spanish–American War broke out; however, he was not asked to serve in the war.

In 1909 he ended his law practice and went to teaching, firstly at Davenport Female College in Lenoir, North Carolina, where he was dean and taught mathematics, and then at Centenary College-Conservatory located in Cleveland, Tennessee. By 1911 he worked as a dean of faculty and taught mathematics at Martha Washington College (which later merged with Emory and Henry College) and shifted to Abingdon, Virginia.

In 1919 Durham bought a half-interest in a girls' school called Southern Seminary in Buena Vista, Virginia. He became its principal and three years later bought the other half-interest from the co-founder of the school, Edgar Healy Rowe. During his tenure, first as principal and later as president, Durham aimed to strengthen the school's academic program and develop the mental, social, physical, and spiritual lives of students. He broadened the school's curriculum to cover college-level courses, and in 1926 the school started to offer a junior college diploma. Durham expanded the facilities of the school to include a gymnasium, modern classroom infrastructure which was now having chemistry and laboratories, and Chandler Hall with a library and an auditorium.

In 1922, Durham's daughter, Margaret, married H. Russell Robey, who later purchased Rowe's remaining interest in the school and became the business manager and treasurer of the school. College-level courses were added to the curriculum, and the first class of the new junior college program graduated in 1925. The school later came to be called Southern Seminary and Junior College.

In 1942 he retired from his position as the president of Southern Seminary and Junior College and his own daughter, Margaret Durham Robey, succeeded him as president of the college. In 1943, he was elected as a member of American Mathematical Society and had his articles published by the organization.

== Views ==
In 1908, Durham wrote a book named The Call of the South, which was based on a novel about miscegenation. In his book, he wrote about the amalgamation of white people and African Americans and warned against racial mixing, claiming that it threatened the downfall of the country. One review from the Associated Press called it "one of the most interesting books I have ever had the pleasure to read". L.C. Page and Company stopped publishing the book by 1911. For three years, sales gradually diminished until the publisher stopped the printing and Durham bought the rights of the book from the publisher.

Durham thought that the idea of holding the office of State Senator was attractive, but he could not find agreement with his party over every issue. Durham found agreement with his party about the issues concerning race, taxation, and other policies, but disagreement over gold caused Durham to decline the office of State Senator. According to Durham, gold should be the standard of the country's currency and he aimed to vote to guarantee its use. Durham declined to have his name on the ballot in an attempt to protect his political allies.

Durham was a Democrat until he saw Franklin D. Roosevelt supporting the end of Prohibition. This led Durham to switch his support to Republican candidate Herbert Hoover, who would become president of the US in 1929. In 1932, Durham campaigned against Roosevelt in favor of Hoover, and called himself a "dry Democrat" who was "betraying" the Democratic Party "for a higher moral cause". Durham was baffled how he could be at odds with his own party. In an attempt to understand his own mind, he wrote a novel Silhouette, which attempted to understand a Southern man having lived through 1920s and into the 1930s.

== Personal life ==
On December 27, 1893, Durham married Mary Willie Craton, daughter of John Miller Craton, a physician of their community. The couple had three sons, who died in childhood, and one daughter. Durham was an active member of the Methodist Church.

== Death and legacy ==
Durham died in his home on January 1, 1949, due to liver cancer. In 1953, his autobiography Since I was born was posthumously published.

In 1996, a group consisting mostly of members of the Church of Jesus Christ of Latter-day Saints bought Southern Seminary following its loss of accreditation. The college was converted into a four-year liberal arts college and in 2001 it became the Southern Virginia University.

In June 2020, Southern Virginia University removed the name of Durham from its main academic building in the wake of the George Floyd protests, citing Durham's racist views.
