= Richard E. Blanchard Sr. =

American songwriter

Richard Eugene Blanchard Sr. (Mar. 14, 1925 – April 19, 2004) was a songwriter who was widely known for writing the popular "Fill My Cup, Lord" (gospel song).

== Biography ==
He was born in 1925 in Chongqing, China, to Methodist missionary parents Ralph and Grace Kipka Blanchard. When the Blanchard family returned home to the United States, Richard grew up as a child and youth in Indiana and North Carolina. Rev. Ralph Blanchard moved from Wolcottville, Indiana, to Tryon, North Carolina, in 1942, bringing his family with him. Blanchard was a senior in high school and graduated from Tryon High School in 1943. During that year, he worked at a Tryon bank, putting his income into war bonds. This financial tactic eventually enabled him to buy lakefront property at Lake Conway, Orange County, Florida, in 1953.

There were other interests and hobbies that were consistent throughout Blanchard's life: He loved boating and dining by the water. He was an avid traveler, whether conducting tours or driving on his own, in over 75 countries. Blanchard had a fondness for fine art and art museums. He followed sports closely and often attended various spectator-sports events. A believer that a busy mind is a sharp mind, Blanchard enjoyed word games such as Scrabble as well as collecting stamps and coins. Above all, however, Blanchard enjoyed meeting, learning about, and helping people. By 2000, Blanchard's health began a serious decline. He and his wife Anne moved to Swannanoa, North Carolina, to be near their children. He lived there until his death on April 19, 2004.

== Education ==
After high school graduation in 1943, Blanchard attended Davidson College for one year and then enlisted in the United States Navy. Receiving a medical discharge, he entered Mercer University in Macon, Georgia, where he received a Bachelor of Arts degree in 1947. In 1946, he married the former Anne Carlton of Oxford, Georgia, a graduate of Wesleyan College. They had three children—Richard Jr. (d. 1996), Carol Ann, and Emily (d. 2005). After graduating from Mercer University, Blanchard enrolled in Candler School of Theology at Emory University, also in Georgia, where he earned a Bachelor of Divinity degree in 1949.

== Ministerial career ==
Blanchard was ordained a deacon in 1949 and an elder in 1950, after serving two years as pastor of the four-church ("four-point") Snellville-Grayson circuit of the North Georgia Conference of the Methodist Church. Transferring to the Florida Conference in 1950, Blanchard completed 40 years in the ministry of the Methodist Church (which became The United Methodist Church on April 23, 1968), serving the following congregations: First Methodist in Orlando as associate pastor; then as senior pastor, Wesley, Coral Gables; First Methodist in Fort Lauderdale; Trinity Methodist in Miami; Palma Ceia in Tampa; First Methodist in Jacksonville; Riviera Beach Methodist; Community Methodist in Holiday; and Conway Methodist in Orlando. Retiring in 1988, Blanchard later renewed his participation in First United Methodist in Orlando and became a member of the Pendergrass Sunday School Class.

== Music and writing accomplishments ==
During the late-1980s, Blanchard wrote a beautiful musical, “Francis of Assisi,” which was produced by Glenn Longacre of Conway for an audience of 600 people. During this period, he was also named “Minister Emeritus” of the Conway Church. In addition to writing numerous gospel songs—many of which were published and recorded—Blanchard also wrote other things. While at Snellville as a young theolog, he wrote a column called Between You and Me every week for the Wesleyan Christian Advocate, the Methodist paper for North and South Georgia. He also wrote a story called “The Little Star” which was published in Ideals magazine. Blanchard was selected to write an official biography of Bishop John Branscomb. Blanchard completed “We Remember John” in time for the dedication of the Branscomb Memorial Auditorium in Lakeland, Florida.

Certainly, Blanchard's most famous song was "Fill My Cup, Lord" (which became a classic). During the 1970s, the song was popularized throughout much of the United States by Blanchard's close friend, musician and evangelist Rev. Ray Vaughn.

Note: Most of the content for this Wikipedia entry comes from the obituary entry for Blanchard that appeared on tryondailybulletin.com . Permission to use this material for this Wikipedia entry has been granted by the Tryon Daily Bulletin.
