= Tricia Hersey =

American poet

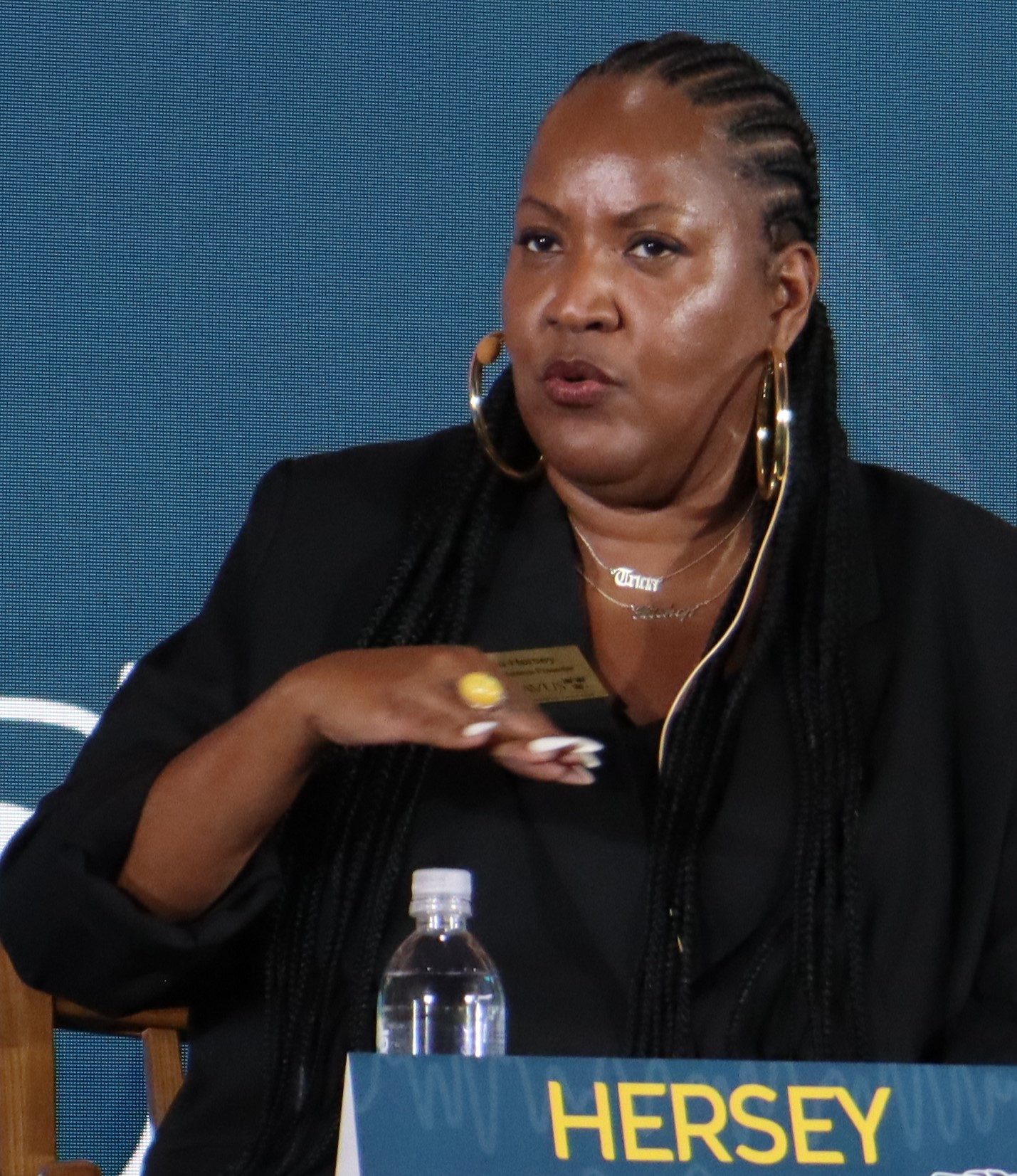
Hersey in 2024

Tricia Hersey is an American poet, performance artist, and activist best known as the founder of the organization The Nap Ministry. She refers to herself as the Nap Bishop and advocates for the importance of rest as a racial and social justice issue.

== Early and Personal life ==
Hersey was born and raised on the south side of Chicago. Her father was a pastor in the Church of God in Christ ( COGIC). Growing up in a black church, Hersey states the culture of prayer, singing, and leadership she saw in church largely influenced her community organizing, creativity, and leadership style. There were several reasons that influenced Herseys journey to becoming a chaplain, she studied Buddhism when attending a buddhist temple in Chicago during her teen years, and learned more about Islam during the time she spent in Morocco. Hersey completed two years of service as a Peace Corps volunteer in Morocco. currently Hersey resides in Atlanta with her husband. She has a son nicknamed dream.

== Education ==
Hersey received her bachelor's degree in public health from Eastern Illinois University. In 2013, she wanted to go back to school for graduate school so moved to Atlanta and attended an open house hosted by divinity school at Candler School of Theology at Emory University. Hersey enrolled and went into the Master of Theology Study Program where she connected her education to human rights, conflict transformations, spirituality, and creativity as protests related to Black Lives Matter were beginning. After she experienced stress related to her graduate program, deaths in her family, and being robbed with her young son, Hersey began taking naps more often. She was also influenced by the memory of her grandmother, who meditated regularly in Hersey's childhood. The additional rest made her feel healthier and more energized, and she began to incorporate rest into her graduate research topics of black liberation theology, somatics, and cultural trauma. Hersey received a Master of Divinity degree from the Candler School of Theology.

== Career ==
Hersey's work argues that sleep deprivation is a racial and social justice issue, and calls for rest as a form of resistance to white supremacy and capitalism. Hersey ties rest to American slavery, when enslaved Africans were regularly sleep deprived, and believes that rest disrupts that history and contemporary "grind culture". She contends that rest is key to Black liberation because it allows space for healing and invention. Hersey has tied Black exhaustion to continued experiences of oppression. Prior to founding the Nap Ministry, Tricia Hersey has had other occupations such as an educator at Chicago public schools where she taught poetry. Hersey also wrote and performed poetry in Chicago. Hersey has stated that she sees education as a tool of healing and liberation within communities. she has also expressed her support for informal forms of education outside of formal institution and participation in self-directed studies, forums on creativity, spirituality, and community issues

She is the author of the Instant New York Times Bestseller Rest is Resistance: A Manifesto which was published October 11, 2022. In this book, Hersey encourages the reader to think about the meaning of rest as well as to reflect on how they can heal and reconnect with themselves.

== The Nap Ministry ==
Hersey founded The Nap Ministry in 2016, an organization that advocates for rest as a form of reparations and a pathway to ancestral connection. The organization seeks to de-stigmatize self-care and sleep. She was inspired by an artistic performance that explores how rest can connect to reparations, resistance and connect us to our ancestors. Hersey also advocates for rest to be a form of healing from traumatic experiences. She spent the first year networking and developing the organization, and hosted the first nap experience in May 2017. Hersey refers to herself as the Nap Bishop and has described the organization as spiritual rather than religious.

The organization hosts collective napping experiences based in Atlanta, where people nap together for 30–40 minutes. Hersey states that the Nap Ministry and the nickname "Nap Bishop" were intentionally chosen to reflect the ease of rests and naps. At the collective napping experiences, the people attending are given yoga mats, pillows, and blankets. As the music plays in the background, Hersey begins these experiences with a meditation and closes out with a group discussion. the conversations usually consist of white supremacy, Capitalism, burnouts, and the way society overworks people. Hersey has also hosted pop-up sessions in Chicago. During the pandemic, the Nap Ministry's social media pages started to become more popular as she shared her ideas and promoted the importance of rest. As of May 2024, the Nap Ministry has 549,000 followers on Instagram.

In 2022, Hersey published her first book, Rest is Resistance: A Manifesto, in which she details her philosophy on the importance of rest. A year later, Hersey published a tarot-style card deck called, The Nap Ministry's Rest Deck: 50 Practices to Resist Grind Culture.

== Soul and Community Care ==
One of Hersey establishments include her soul care sessions. Her motivation for starting this was because she was born out of the prayers of her grandparents and parents‚ who survived and thrived as a result of a constant state of prayer and connection to community as a healing tool․ Hersey passion for community building allowed her to create Soul sessions, a blend of rest coaching and spiritual direction for healing․ during this time, Hersey encourages engagement with text‚ song‚ silence‚ poetry‚ meditation‚ rest‚ prayer and collective dreaming to enable exhausted bodies and minds to self-care and self-reflection․ She also organizes workshops based on writing poetry, black liberation theology, and creative empowerment
