= Woodie W. White =

Woodie Walter White (born 1935) is an American bishop of the United Methodist Church, elected in 1984.

== Birth and family ==
Woodie was born on August 27, 1935, in New York City. He is married to the former Jennie (Kim) Tolson, a native of Worcester, Massachusetts. She attended Clark University in Worcester, and holds degrees from Howard Community College and Towson University. An elementary school teacher, Mrs. White was honored as the 1992 "Teacher of the Year" by the Springfield, Illinois School District. The Whites have four daughters: Kimberly Yvette, Hope Angela, Valerie Elizabeth, and Sharon Denise, and one son, Bryan Michael.

== Education ==
Woodie graduated from the DeWitt Clinton High School in the West Bronx in New York City in 1953 and from Paine College in Augusta, Georgia, in 1958. He earned an S.T.B. (Doctorate of Sacred Theology) from Boston University School of Theology in 1961. While attending BU he served a pastorate in Worcester, Massachusetts. He then became a Probationary Member of the Detroit Annual Conference and was appointed the Associate Pastor of the East Grand Boulevard Methodist Church in Detroit, and in 1963 became the pastor. In 1967 he began two years as an Urban Missioner for the Conference work in Metropolitan Detroit.

When the United Methodist Church established a General Commission on Religion and Race in 1968, Rev. White became its first General Secretary, serving in that capacity until 1984. The North Central Jurisdictional Conference of the U.M. Church elected him Bishop in 1984 and assigned him to the Illinois Area, which he served 1984-1992. In 1992 Bishop White was assigned to the Indiana Area, from which he retired on September 1, 2004.

Bishop White holds honorary doctorates from Adrian College, Rust College, McKendree University, Illinois Wesleyan University, McMurry College and the University of Evansville. He holds numerous other honors, including the Distinguished Alumni Award from Boston University, an Urban Award from the U.S. Government Office of Economic Opportunity, and the Distinguished Service Award from the United Committee on Negro History. One of the highest honors for a civilian in the state of Indiana is the "Sagamore of the Wabash" award. It's given by the Governor of Indiana to Hoosiers who have demonstrated distinguished service to the state or significant contributions to its citizens. It's a prestigious recognition and is often awarded to individuals who have made exceptional contributions to their communities, professions, or the state as a whole. It's likely that Bishop Woodie White, given his significant contributions to the Indiana community during his tenure as a bishop there, may have been honored with this award.

In addition to professional honors, Bishop White was on a four-person task force to examine racism and race relations in Australia and New Zealand for the Committee to Combat Racism of the World Council of Churches. He participated in preaching missions in Chile, Argentina, and Brazil. He has served as part-time faculty at Wesley Theological Seminary, Emory University, and at Howard University School of Religion. He is currently the bishop-in-residence at Candler School of Theology. He has written extensively for denominational and ecumenical periodicals, and is coauthor of Racial Transition in the Church, Confessions of a Prairie Pilgrim, and Conversations of the Heart.

In retirement, Bishop White serves as Bishop-In-Residence at the Candler School of Theology, Emory University in Atlanta, Georgia.

== Selected writings ==
- Confessions of a Prairie Pilgrim, Nashville, Abingdon Press, 1987, ISBN 0-687-09391-0

== See also ==
- List of bishops of the United Methodist Church
