= Conservative Party (North Carolina) =

Political party in North Carolina, United States

The Conservative Party, later the Constitutional Union Party or Conservative Union Party, was a political party in the U.S. state of North Carolina. Formed in 1862 during the American Civil War amidst the collapse of the state's traditional party system by critics of the policies of the Confederate States of America and Jefferson Davis, it challenged the remnant incumbent Democratic Party leaders for control of the state. During the Reconstruction era, it served as the chief opposing force to the North Carolina Republican Party. In 1876, it renamed itself the Democratic Party.

== Origins ==
Following secession, North Carolina's party system, dominated by the Whig Party and the Democratic Party, broke down. During the 1861 Confederate States presidential election, dissatisfied Whigs in North Carolina attempted to run a ticket against Jefferson Davis, who was ultimately successful. Early fractures in North Carolina's political leadership emerged over Davis' appointments, with dissenters feeling that North Carolinians were underrepresented in the Confederate civil and military leadership. Under the Davis administration, the Confederacy adopted centralized and controlling measures to support its war effort, including martial law, impressment of slaves for labor, military seizure of key ports and transportation routes, and the imposition of higher taxes. These actions engendered outrage among some North Carolinians, especially those concerned about states' rights. The adoption of the Conscription Act of 1862 also proved deeply controversial in North Carolina, especially provisions that allowed men with enough wealth to hire substitutes to serve in their place and exempted men with significant slave holdings from the draft.

William Woods Holden, a Democratic newspaper editor dissatisfied with Confederate policies and the early conduct of the war—particularly federal incursions into North Carolina's weakly-defended coast, worked to consolidate a new political organization opposed to the incumbent state administration led by Governor Henry Toole Clark. By 1862, with the help of erstwhile Unionists, Holden had created the Conservative Party. The new grouping was predominated by former Whigs, including William Alexander Graham, George E. Badger, and Jonathan Worth. Dissident Democrats who joined Holden included Robert P. Dick and Thomas Settle. Holden and Graham served as the party's leading figures. Lower-class white voters concerned with Confederate conscription policies offered the grouping popular support. Under this new emerging political system, the faction of the Democratic Party associated with the incumbent administration and occupied by the more ardent secessionists became known as the "Confederate Party". (Note: The validity of the Confederate Party as an extant, distinct political organization and the origins of its name are disputed. According to historian Gordon B. McKinney, the label "Confederate Party" was bestowed by the Conservatives upon their adversaries, either in reference to a Raleigh-based anti-Conservative newspaper, the Confederate, or in an attempt to link the faction with the Davis administration. According to historian Paul D. Escott and Holden biographer Horace W. Raper, the Confederate Party was self-organized by the secessionists. The Conservatives also derided the Confederate Party group as the "Destructives".)

== Civil War years ==
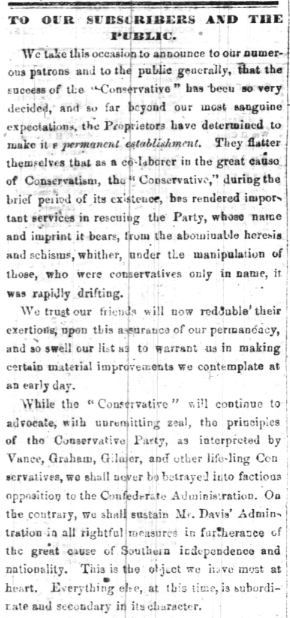
Editorial in The Daily Conservative of August 10, 1864, describing its objectives to support the party

In 1862, the Confederates initially proposed suspending North Carolina's anticipated gubernatorial election, arguing that it was in the interest of the Confederate war effort to avoid arousing political disputes and potentially changing the incumbent administration by holding such a contest. The Conservative faction argued this was antidemocratic and its viewpoint eventually prevailed, with the Secession Convention voting to allow the election to proceed and requiring that the victor be inaugurated in September 1862.

The Confederate Party decided against nominating Governor Clark, owing to his unpopularity and perceived lack of political skill, and instead endorsed William Johnston, a secessionist former Whig. The Conservative Party initially sought to back Graham but, after he declined to run, decided to support a candidacy by Colonel Zebulon Vance. Vance participated little in the actual campaign, with most of the effort being conducted by Holden and fellow newspaper editor Edward J. Hale. Through his newspaper, the Standard, Holden attacked Johnston and the incumbent forces as corrupt and inept and criticized the Conscription Act as inequitable. Vance easily won the election, securing 55,282 votes to Johnston's 20,813. Following the 1862 election, the Confederate Party quickly dwindled in significance and offered few candidates for public office. Conservatives also secured a majority of the seats in the General Assembly.

Following the electoral success, Holden created a plan adopted by the General Assembly to replace all non-Conservative state officials. He and Vance initially enjoyed a close relationship, with Vance consulting him on major political issues, while Holden's newspaper, the Standard, supported the governor's administration. Owing to Vance's influence, Holden was appointed state printer in November 1862. The Conservative-led legislature also elected Graham to the Confederate States Senate, elected Worth state treasurer, and appointed Dick to the North Carolina Council of State.

As governor, Vance remained a staunch supporter of the Confederate war effort but protested the suspension of habeas corpus and seizures of civilian property, which he viewed as overbearing. Worth quickly turned against Vance, accusing his administration of operating without concerning for corruption or financial responsibility. By 1863, Vance's relationship with Holden had soured over differing opinions on pursuing peace. Holden believed North Carolina should advocate for an end to the war both as a means of curtailing a destructive conflict and securing favorable terms with the federal government as well as securing more favorable treatment from the Confederate government. This included threatening secession from the Confederacy. Vance only believed in pursuing peace with the cooperation of other secessionist states, and Holden's attempts as the Conservative Party leader to influence him proved futile.

Buoyed by a growing peace movement in North Carolina, Holden decided to break from the Conservatives and challenge Vance in the 1864 gubernatorial election on an independent peace ticket. The Confederate Party offered no candidate. Many of the Conservatives were old-line Whigs who had had distrusted Holden for his prewar allegiance to the Democrats and quickly disavowed his actions as treasonous. Worth offered quiet support to the peace movement. Vance declared that he would rather "see the Conservative party blown into a thousand atoms and Holden and his understrappers in hell [...] before I will consent to a course which I think would bring dishonor and ruin upon both the state and the Confederacy!" To support his campaign, he and several like-minded Conservatives founded a newspaper based in Raleigh, the Conservative. Vance secured re-election, winning 43,579 votes to Holden's 28,982. The contest left the Conservative Party fractured, though Vance's faction held a strong advantage. The Conservative newspaper continued on, and issued an editorial pledging to "advocate, with unremitting zeal, the principles of the Conservative party, as interpreted by Vance, Graham, Gilmer and other lifelong Conservatives [and would] never be betrayed into factious opposition to the Confederate Administration."

In April 1865, federal troops seized Raleigh and destroyed the offices of the Conservative. Governor Vance's capture by federal troops in May and the concurrent collapse of the Confederacy weakened the Conservative Party.

== Reconstruction and transformation into the Democratic Party ==
In the aftermath of the Civil War, the Conservatives attempted to preserve the social and political status quo in the state. Under President Andrew Johnson, a policy of Presidential Reconstruction was adopted in the Southern states, and Holden was appointed provisional governor of North Carolina by Johnson on May 29, 1865. Conservative-dominated constitutional conventions in October 1865 and 1866 produced a constitution which nullified secession, abolished slavery, and repudiated debt in service of the Confederate war effort, but the document was not ratified due to lack of popular support. Holden and Worth split over the issue of debt repudiation, and Worth soon announced that he would run against Holden for the governor's office in the next election. Worth eventually prevailed with the backing of a Conservative-led coalition.

In 1867, the Republican-controlled U.S. Congress, dissatisfied with President Johnson's policies, passed the Reconstruction Acts. The North Carolina Republican Party was organized in support of Congressional Reconstruction, while the Conservatives rallied to oppose it. Conservatives were outraged by the rapid ascendance of poorer and more ordinary men to public office at the expense of the traditional wealthy elite. Their party morphed to include both prewar Unionist-leaning Whigs and former Democratic secessionists, though some found this situation uncomfortable, with William Henry Bagley, Worth's secretary, expressing "disgust" at feeling it necessary to join with his former political enemies to rally against Republican Reconstruction. President Johnson's pardon of numerous ex-Confederate leaders in the state in March 1867 furthered the redevelopment of the new party. Graham remained its unofficial leader, with Worth and Vance also serving as prominent figures. The Republicans often referred to the Conservatives as "Democrats" when criticizing them to associate them with the pre-war party that many Whigs and other political factions had opposed. In an attempt to split off poorer white voters from the Republican Party, Conservatives appealed to white supremacy, arguing that the elevation of blacks to equal legal status to whites threatened all whites' social status. As the year progressed, Conservatives increasingly focused on issues of race, with those initially open to qualified suffrage for blacks and opposed to the concept of a "white man's party" reneging on their earlier views. They also embraced universal suffrage for whites, bolstering their democratic credentials while also hoping to construct a coalition committed to thwarting black political objectives. (Note: There were black Conservatives, but they had marginal impact in both the Conservative Party and in the black community.)

Pursuant to the Reconstruction Acts, federal military authorities under General Edward Canby directed North Carolina to organize a new constitutional convention and host elections for delegates in November 1867. The Republicans conducted a campaign in favor of a new constitution, which the Conservatives were too disorganized to effectively counter. They divided into three camps on the issue: those in favor of a convention and seeking to win a majority of the delegates, those opposed in the belief that Congressional Reconstruction was wholly unconstitutional, and those opposed owing to the participation of blacks as voters. Of the 120 delegates elected to the convention, 107 were Republicans. The convention convened in Raleigh in January 1868. Plato Durham and John W. Graham, both Confederate veterans and the latter a son of William Graham, provided leadership to the small contingent of Conservative delegates. The Conservative delegates proved vociferous critics of the convention's proceedings, but ultimately had little influence on its produced work. They found some consensus with Republicans on matters of economic relief and shaped the passage of a stay ordinance for debt collection. The draft constitution provided for universal male suffrage, removed property requirements for office seekers, made state executive and county offices elective, supported a system of public education, and reformed the state judiciary. The Conservatives were particularly opposed to the provisions permitting black suffrage, the lack of property qualifications to vote for state senators, and the direct election of judges and executive officers. They mounted a campaign against the draft constitution's ratification, deriding it as "Canby's constitution" and the "black and tan constitution". Despite this, the document was ratified in a referendum.

On February 5–6, 1868, the Conservative Party held a convention under the chairmanship of Graham to assemble a party platform. Renaming their organization the Constitutional Union Party or Conservative Union Party, the delegates declared their recognition of the U.S. constitution but denounced the Reconstruction Acts. In anticipation of the upcoming gubernatorial contest, the party nominated Thomas Samuel Ashe as its candidate. The state Republican Party convention selected Holden as its gubernatorial nominee. In the ensuing general election campaign, the Conservative Unionists offered three main messages: opposition to the draft constitution, opposition to Holden's gubernatorial candidacy, and the lack of moral character in other Republican candidates. The Republicans scored a large victory in the general election and the constitution was ratified. Conservatives expressed outrage at the new political status quo. Thereafter, their party supported repeal of the charter at the soonest available opportunity. Conservatives favored the Democratic ticket during the 1868 United States presidential and congressional elections.

As the Ku Klux Klan and other militant white supremacist organizations gained strength in North Carolina, members confessed that their political objectives included supporting the Conservative Party. Some prominent Conservatives supported efforts to organize the Klan and served as Klan leaders. Historian Mark L. Bradley wrote, "In effect, the Klan functioned as the terrorist wing of the Conservative Party." The Klan was suppressed by federal authorities in wake of the Ku Klux Klan Act, though by then it had achieved its political objectives and fallen out of favor with the Conservatives due to their difficulty to control. Some influential local Conservative leaders were able to convince Klan chapters to disband when they no longer suited their purposes.

Following the 1870 elections, the Senate had 33 Conservatives and 17 Republicans, while the House held 72 Conservatives, 45 Republicans, and three independents. Following the consideration of disputed elections by the legislature, six Republicans had their victories invalidated. The Conservative-dominated body then quickly embarked on a program of dismantling the Republicans' Reconstruction efforts. It voted to call for a popular vote to consider calling a new constitutional convention, though the 1871 referendum resulted in a rejection of the proposal. Several specific amendments proposed by the assembly to reestablish legislative control over various spheres of government were approved by referendum in 1873.

Over the course of the 1870s, the Conservatives increasingly identified themselves as Democrats.

== Works cited ==
- Beckel, Deborah (2011). Radical Reform: Interracial Politics in Post-Emancipation North Carolina. Charlottesville: University of Virginia Press. ISBN 978-0-8139-3002-2.
- Bradley, Mark L. (2011). Bluecoats and Tar Heels: Soldiers and Civilians in Reconstruction North Carolina (paperback ed.). Lexington: The University of Kentucky Press. ISBN 978-0-8131-3385-0.
- Cheney, John L. Jr., ed. (1981). North Carolina Government, 1585-1979: A Narrative and Statistical History (revised ed.). Raleigh: North Carolina Secretary of State. OCLC 1290270510.
- Crow, Jeffrey J.; Durden, Robert F. (1977). Maverick Republican in the Old North State : A Political Biography of Daniel L. Russell. Baton Rouge: Louisiana State University Press. ISBN 9780807102916.
- Escott, Paul D. (1985). Many Excellent People : Power and Privilege in North Carolina, 1850-1900. Chapel Hill: University of North Carolina Press. ISBN 978-0-8078-1651-6.
- Evans, William McKee (1995). Ballots and Fence Rails: Reconstruction on the Lower Cape Fear (reprint ed.). Athens: University of Georgia Press. ISBN 0-8203-1731-4.
- Harris, William C. (October 1982). "William Woods Holden: In Search of Vindication". The North Carolina Historical Review. 59 (4): 354–372. JSTOR 23521800.
- Nash, Steven E. (2016). Reconstruction's Ragged Edge: The Politics of Postwar Life in the Southern Mountains. Chapel Hill: The University of North Carolina Press. ISBN 9781469626246.
- Olsen, Otto H. (July 1962). "The Ku Klux Klan: A Study in Reconstruction Politics and Propaganda". The North Carolina Historical Review. 39 (3): 340–362. ISSN 0029-2494. JSTOR 23517289.
- Olsen, Otto H. (1965). Carpetbagger's Crusade: The Life of Albion Winegar Tourgee. Baltimore: The Johns Hopkins Press. LCCN 65-13522.
- Raper, Horace W. (1985). William W. Holden: North Carolina's Political Enigma. Chapel Hill: University of North Carolina Press. ISBN 0807850608.
- Tuyll, Debra Reddin Van (2008). "Necessity and the Invention of a Newspaper: Gov. Zebulon B. Vance's Conservative, 1864-65". Journalism History. 34 (2): 87–97. ProQuest 205363884.
- Williard, David C. (February 2019). "Criminal Amnesty, State Courts, and the Reach of Reconstruction". The Journal of Southern History. 85 (1): 105–136. JSTOR 26641765.
