= 1864 North Carolina gubernatorial election =

- August 4, 1864
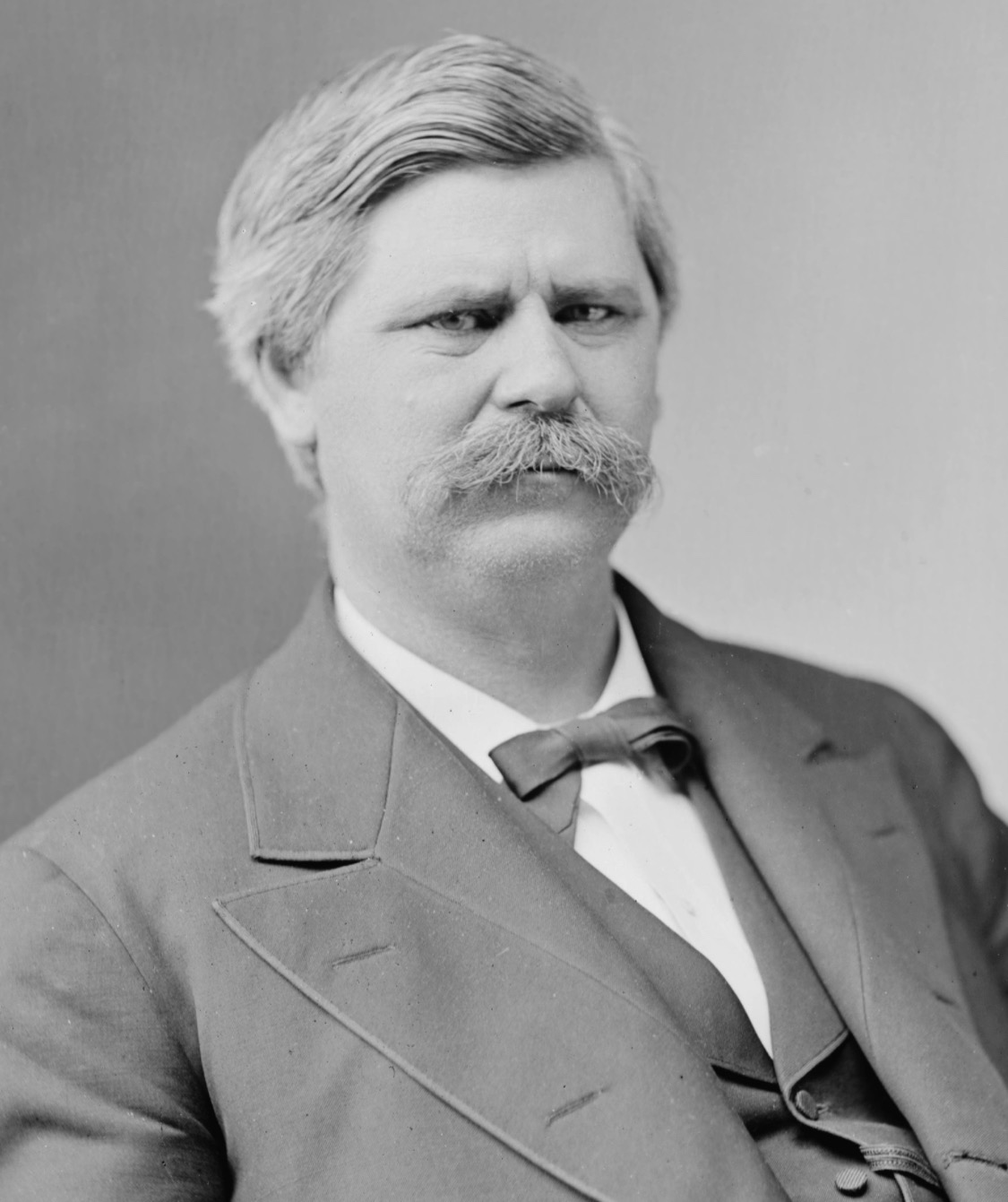

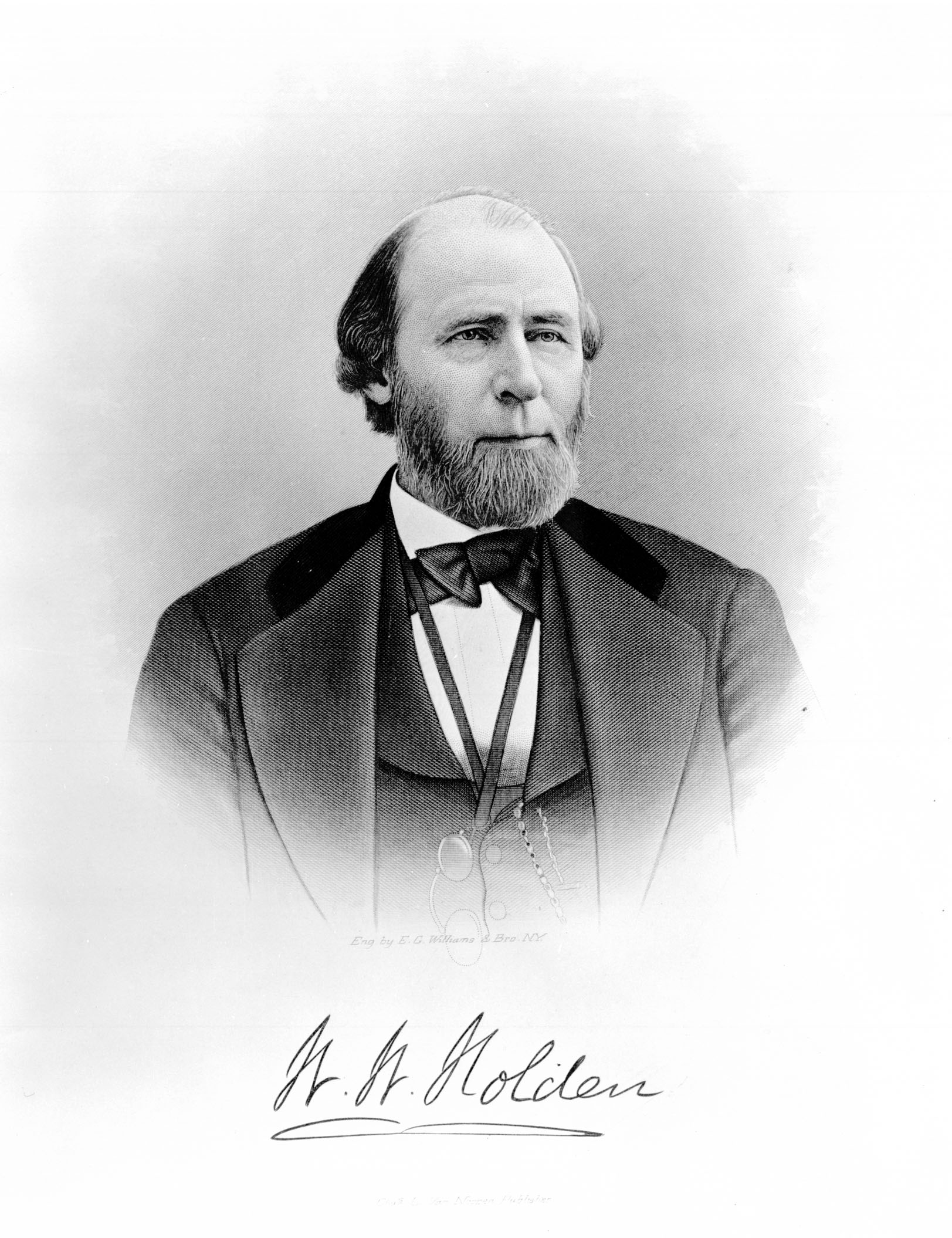
Nominee	Zebulon Vance	William Woods Holden
Party	Nonpartisan	Nonpartisan
Alliance	Conservative	Peace
Popular vote	58,070	14,491
Percentage	80.03%	19.97%
- County results Vance: 50–60% 60–70% 70–80% 80–90% >90% Holden: 50–60% No vote
Governor before election
Zebulon Vance
Elected Governor
Zebulon Vance

The 1864 North Carolina gubernatorial election was held on August 4, 1864, in order to elect the Governor of North Carolina. Incumbent Conservative Governor Zebulon Vance won re-election against former member of the North Carolina House of Commons William Woods Holden.

== General election ==
On election day, August 4, 1864, incumbent conservative Governor Zebulon Vance won re-election by a margin of 43,579 votes against his opponent William Woods Holden, thereby retaining the office of Governor. Vance was sworn in for his second term on December 22, 1864.

=== Results ===
North Carolina gubernatorial election, 1864
Party	Candidate	Votes	%
Nonpartisan	Zebulon Vance (incumbent)	58,070	80.03
Nonpartisan	William Woods Holden	14,491	19.97
Total votes		72,561	100.00
