= Nancy Eiesland =

American theologian (1964–2009)

- Born: April 6, 1964; Cando, North Dakota, U.S.
- Died: March 10, 2009 (aged 44)
- Known for: The Disabled God

Academic work
- Institutions: Candler School of Theology (Emory University)

Nancy L. Eiesland (April 6, 1964 – March 10, 2009) was an American theologian. She was professor at the Candler School of Theology at Emory University in Atlanta.

Eiesland, born with a congenital bone defect, underwent numerous operations in her youth and experienced considerable pain as well as disability. These factors informed her theological perspective that God is disabled, culminating in her publication of The Disabled God: Toward a Liberatory Theology of Disability (1994). A German translation of this book was published in 2018: Nancy L. Eiesland, Der behinderte Gott. Anstöße zu einer Befreiungstheologie der Behinderung. Übersetzt und eingeleitet von Werner Schüßler, Würzburg: Echter Verlag, 2018, 2nd ed. 2020.

Eiesland died of lung cancer at age 44.

== Legacy ==
In the Fall 2014 Centennial Commemorative Edition of the Candler Connection magazine, Eiesland is posthumously recognized as one of fifty-six Centennial Medalists, and The Disabled God is named among the most significant books written by Candler faculty in its first 100 years.

In 2015, Candler established the Nancy Eiesland Endowment Lecture series in Eiesland's honor.
