= Henrietta, North Carolina =

- Unincorporated community
- Location in North Carolina Location in the United States
- Coordinates: 35°15′25″N 81°48′05″W
- Country: United States
- State: North Carolina
- County: Rutherford

Area
  - Total: 0.59 sq mi (1.52 km^{2})
  - Land: 0.58 sq mi (1.51 km^{2})
  - Water: 0.0039 sq mi (0.01 km^{2})
- Elevation: 804 ft (245 m)

Population (2020)
  - Total: 395
  - Density: 676.7/sq mi (261.29/km^{2})
- Time zone: UTC-5 (Eastern (EST))
  - Summer (DST): UTC-4 (EDT)
- ZIP code: 28076
- Area code: Area code 828
- FIPS code: 37-37161
- GNIS feature ID: 2628634

Henrietta is a census-designated place and unincorporated community in Rutherford County, North Carolina, United States. As of the 2020 census, the population was 395.

== Demographics ==
Historical population
Census	Pop.	Note	%±
2020	395		—
U.S. Decennial Census
