= Arthur James Armstrong =

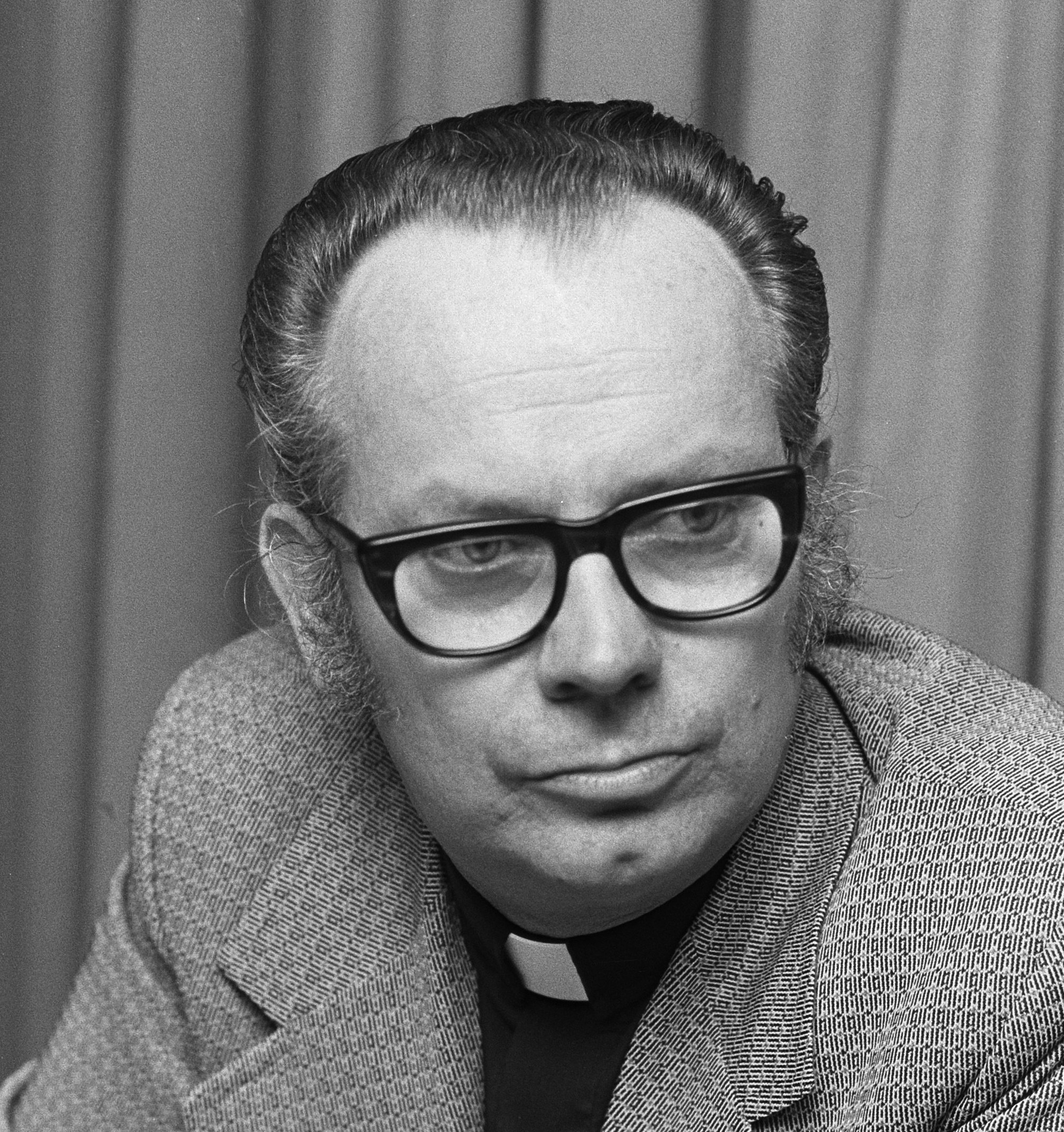
Arthur James Armstrong (1973)

(Arthur) James Armstrong (September 17, 1924 – July 17, 2018) was a bishop of the United Methodist Church. Elected in 1968, he became the youngest Methodist bishop in the United States at the age of 43. As president of the National Council of Churches he was called "the most influential religious leader in America" by the U.S. News & World Report in 1982.

== Life and work ==
He was the son and grandson of Methodist ministers. Earning academic degrees from Florida Southern College (AB) and the Candler School of Theology, Emory University (M.Div.)) he did graduate work at Boston University and the University of Chicago. He was awarded honorary degrees by Emory University, Florida Southern College, DePauw, Illinois Wesleyan, Evansville and Dakota Wesleyan universities, and Westmar College.

Prior to his election to the episcopacy, Armstrong gained wide recognition as the innovative Pastor of the Broadway United Methodist Church in Indianapolis, Indiana; at the time the largest Methodist church in the state. In the early 1960s, the Indianapolis News named him one of the ten most influential "Movers and Shakers" in the city. He chaired the denomination's Board of Church and Society and its Commission on Religion and Race.

The author of a dozen books and a contributor to many more, he has also written widely for Christian journals and periodicals.

Active in human rights and global peace and justice movements he has also been a political activist. He organized and chaired Religious Leaders for McGovern, a group of more than 200 religious leaders, during the presidential campaign of 1972. When he left South Dakota in 1980, the Sioux Falls Argus Leader, the largest newspaper in the state, headlined, "South Dakota's social conscience prepares to move on."

Armstrong met with Kim Dae-jung in his home in Seoul, South Korea, when Kim was under house arrest. Kim painted a calligraphy for him which now hangs in his office. Later Kim would serve as President of South Korea and receive the Nobel Peace Prize.

In 1985 he resigned his position as bishop following a personal crisis. Following his retirement from the ministry in 1999, Armstrong taught at the Florida Center for Theological Studies. In his 90s, he continued teaching at Rollins College in Winter Park, Florida. In 2010 students selected him to receive the Walter E. Barden Distinguished Teaching Award. Each year Dakota Wesleyan University gives a "Bishop Armstrong Peace and Justice Award" to an outstanding student who has made significant contributions to peace and justice. DWU also maintains an Armstrong Native American Scholarship fund.

Married to Sharon who said he was "a generous and loving husband," he was also a father, grandfather, great grandfather, and great-great grandfather.

== Selected writings ==
- Truth Telling: The Foolishness of Preaching in a Real World
- The Nation Yet to Be (a bicentennial study book that went through several editions)
- Wilderness Voices
- The United Methodist Primer, (Revised Edition) Nashville, Discipleship Resources, 1976 (originally published Nashville, Tidings, 1972).
- Mission: Middle America
- The Urgent Now
- The Journey That Men Make
- The Pastor and the Public Servant
- Living and Dying with Purpose and Grace
- Change: Reflections on Social Change and Personal Transformation
- If Only: George McGovern and the America That Might Have Been
- The Clock is Ticking: a 'How To' Approach to the Aging Process

== See also ==
- List of bishops of the United Methodist Church
