= William Ragsdale Cannon =

American bishop (1916–1997)

William Ragsdale Cannon (April 5, 1916 – May 11, 1997) was the dean of Candler School of Theology (1953–1968) and an American bishop of the United Methodist Church, elected in 1968.

== Birth and family ==
William was born in Chattanooga, Tennessee, the son of William Ragsdale and Emma McAfee Cannon. Bishop Cannon was raised in Dalton, Georgia. He never married.

== Education ==
William graduated from the University of Georgia in Athens, Georgia in 1937 and from Yale Divinity School in New Haven, Connecticut in 1940. He earned his Ph.D. degree from Yale University in 1942. While attending UGA, he was a member of the Demosthenian Literary Society, where he served as an officer and had a speech regarding the value of Christianity saved for posterity by faculty advisor Albert B. Saye. He has since been memorialized on the Demosthenian Wall of Fame.

== Ordained and academic ministry ==
Cannon served churches in Oxford before joining the faculty of Candler School of Theology, Emory University in 1943. From 1953 until 1968 Cannon served as the dean of the seminary. In the mid-1960s Dean Cannon defended Emory's retention of Religion Professor Thomas J.J. Altizer, a proponent of the death-of-God position. This position later came to be known as the God is Dead controversy. Cannon also guided Candler through racial integration.

Cannon was regularly elected as a delegate to Methodist Jurisdictional and General Conferences, beginning in 1948. During the administration of Jimmy Carter, Cannon served as an unofficial envoy of the President.

Cannon had the high honor of being a Protestant observer at the Vatican II Council of the Roman Catholic Church in Rome in 1965. Later, as a bishop, he also observed the Extraordinary Synod of the R.C. Church in 1985. He became friends with Pope John Paul II, who sent a statement to be read at Cannon's funeral in 1997.

== Episcopal ministry ==
Cannon was highly influential in the Council of Bishops of the United Methodist Church. For example, he delivered the episcopal address at the 1984 General Conference, the highest honor conferred on a bishop by his/her episcopal colleagues. As a bishop, Cannon stressed Christian education and evangelism, and was known for his classically orthodox, Wesleyan positions.

As a bishop he was assigned, successively, to the Raleigh Episcopal Area (1968–72), the Richmond Area (1970–72), the Atlanta Area (1972–80), and the Raleigh Area again (1980–84). Cannon also served as a member of the board of trustees at Emory, Asbury College, and Duke University. He was President of the World Methodist Council from 1981 until 1986.

He retired to Georgia in 1984, becoming bishop-in-residence at the Northside United Methodist Church in Atlanta and professor at Candler School of Theology at Emory University. In 1994 he was one of the principal founders of The Confessing Movement of the United Methodist Church. This movement focused on the Church's mission to "retrieve its classical doctrinal identity, and to live it out as disciples of Christ."

Bishop Cannon died in 1997 at the Crawford Long Hospital in Atlanta. He is buried in West Hill Cemetery in Dalton. Cannon Chapel at Emory University is named in his honor.

== Selected writings ==
- The History of Christianity in the Middle Ages
- The Journeys After Saint Paul
- The Theology of John Wesley: With Special Reference to the Doctrine of Justification, Nashville: Abingdon Press, 1946
- Evangelism in a Contemporary Context, Nashville, Tidings, 1974.

== Biographies ==
- Cannon, William Ragsdale, A Magnificent Obsession: The Autobiography of William Ragsdale Cannon, Nashville, Abingdon Press, 1999.
- Freeman, G. Ross, "Georgia's Methodist Bishops," Historical Highlights 8 (June 1978): 5-23.
- Article on William Ragsdale Cannon at New Georgia Encyclopedia

== See also ==
- List of bishops of the United Methodist Church
