= Franklin Nutting Parker =

Franklin Nutting Parker (May 20, 1867 – March 1, 1954) was the second dean of Candler School of Theology, serving from 1919 to 1937.

== General Biography ==
Franklin Nutting Parker was born in New Orleans, Louisiana, on May 20, 1867. He was the son of Bishop Linus Parker and Ellen Katherine Burruss Parker. He attended Centenary College of Louisiana and then Tulane University. Parker served in churches throughout Louisiana until 1911 when he left to become the professor of Biblical literature at Trinity College in Durham, North Carolina (now known as Duke University). He taught there for three years until he was sought by Bishop Warren A. Candler to come to the newly founded Candler School of Theology at Emory University, where Parker would spend the rest of his life. He occupied the chair of systematic theology from 1915 to 1918, and then became dean of the school in 1919. Parker served as dean until 1938 when he became dean emeritus. He continued teaching, however, until 1942.

Parker was married to Minnie Greeves Jones, and they had two daughters. Franklin N. Parker died on March 1, 1954, in Atlanta, Georgia.

== Emory University Candler School of Theology ==
When Dean Durham resigned in November 1918, the chair was held for a month by Dean Howard. Dr. Parker became Dean on January 1, 1919, and served in that position until June 1937 (he was 71 years old). Like Dean Durham before him, he remained an active member of the faculty until his retirement in 1942 at 81 years of age.

In 1918, the General Conference of the Methodist Episcopal Church, South elected Dr. Parker a bishop. He declined. In 1922 he would not allow his name to be put into nomination for bishop, as he preferred to remain working as Dean.

In 1920, Dr. Parker served as Acting Chancellor after Warren A. Candler asked to resign and then as Acting President when Bishop Candler reluctantly resumed the chancellorship for a period of time. In the fall of 1920, Dr. Harvey Warner Cox assumed the office of president for the University.

=== Controversies ===
Tensions had existed in the Durham administration of Candler School of Theology, but they became a crucial problem for Dean Parker. The liberal leanings of the school and faculty were well known in the institutional church. The church's suspicions of Candler were based primarily on the theological liberalism of Professors Sledd, Smart and Shelton. These professors were committed to a historical critical approach to the Bible (commonly known as higher criticism).

=== Franklin N. Parker Chair ===
Methodist ministers in the Southeastern Jurisdiction of the church created an endowment fund for a named professorship in 1940. The title of Franklin N. Parker Chair was first given in 1953. The following faculty have held the Parker Chair:

Mack B. Stokes, Systematic Theology: 1953-1972

Charles Gerkin, Pastoral Theology: 1970-1992

Don E. Saliers, Theology and Worship: 1997-2000

John H. Hayes, Hebrew Bible: 2006-2007

David L. Peterson, Hebrew Bible: 2009-2010

John R. Snarey, Human Development and Ethics: 2014–present.
