= Candler School of Theology =

U.S. educational institution

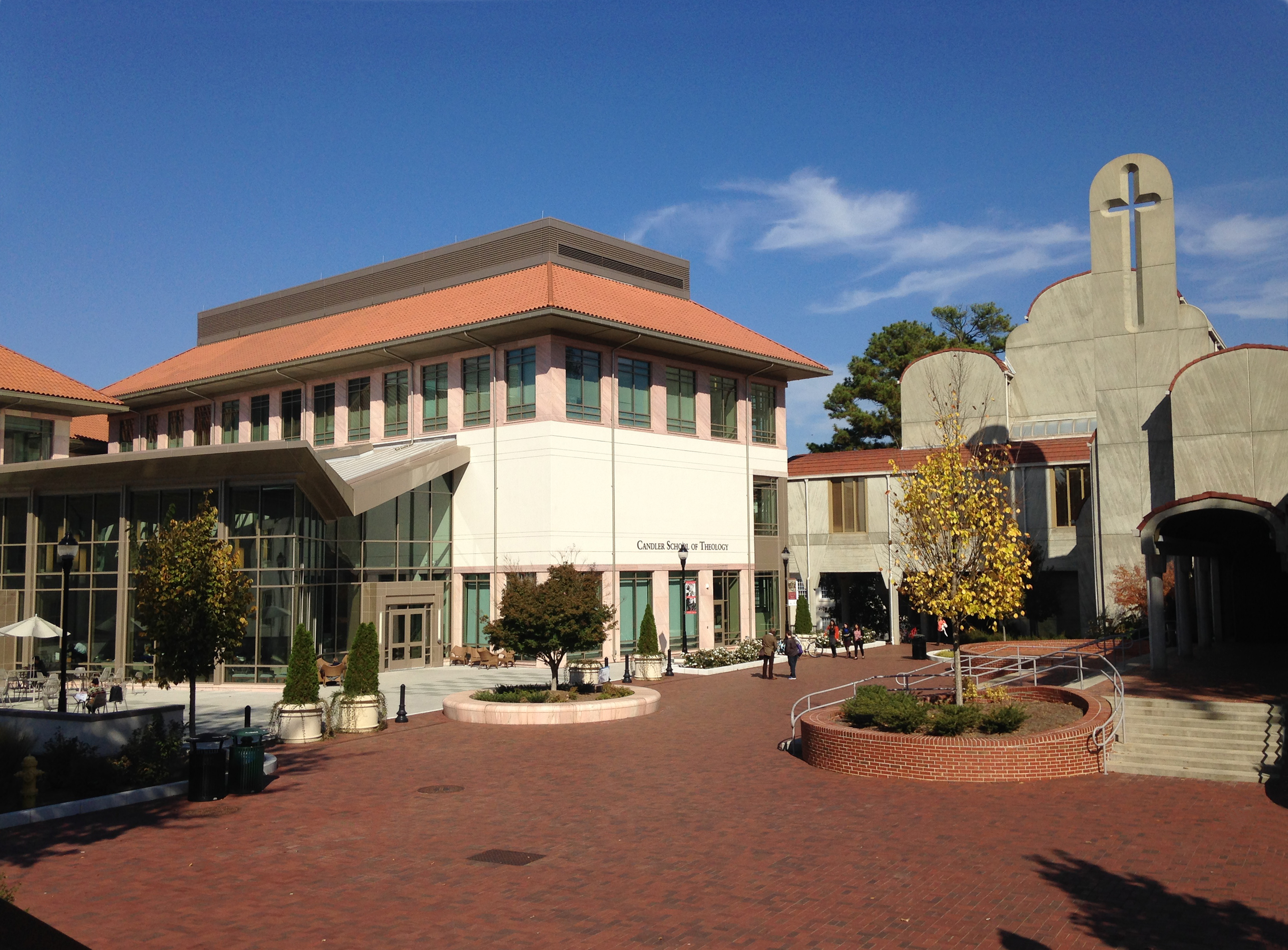
- Type: Private seminary
- Established: 1914; 112 years ago
- Parent institution: Emory University
- Affiliations: United Methodist Church
- Dean: Terrence L. (Kojo) Johnson
- Faculty: 50
- Students: 564
- Location: Atlanta, Georgia, United States; 33°47′23.1″N 84°19′12.75″W
- Campus: Suburban
- Website: candler.emory.edu

Candler School of Theology is one of seven graduate schools at Emory University, located in metropolitan Atlanta, Georgia, United States. A university-based school of theology, Candler educates ministers, scholars of religion and other leaders. It is also one of 13 seminaries affiliated with the United Methodist Church.

== History ==
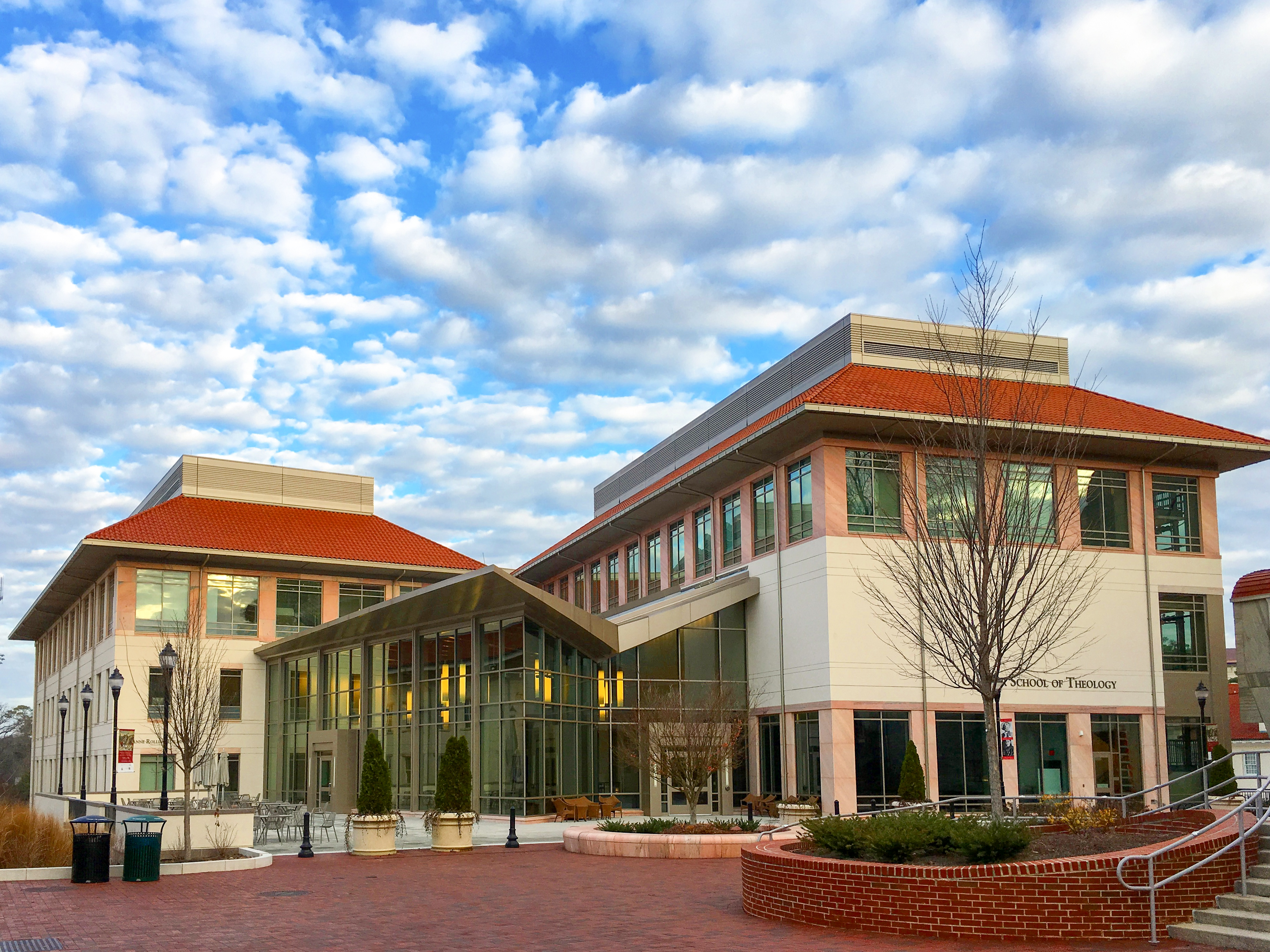
Candler School of Theology

In March 1914, the Methodist Episcopal Church, South (MECS) and Vanderbilt University, a flagship institution of higher education for the church, severed ties. MECS appointed an Educational Commission to establish a university in the Southeast that would be a place where pastors-in-training at Vanderbilt could continue their education by the fall. Asa Candler, founder of The Coca-Cola Company and brother of commission chair Warren Candler, promised one million dollars for the endowment of the southeastern university. The commission voted unanimously to locate it in Atlanta. Emory College in Oxford, Georgia, agreed to become the undergraduate division of the university and the university was given the name Emory University in recognition of the college's history.

In September 1914, the theology school began instruction at Wesley Memorial Church, moving to the Druid Hills campus in 1916. In 1915, the Emory University trustees voted to name the theology school Candler, though the meeting minutes don't indicate definitively whether the name is in honor of Warren or Asa Candler.

In 1922, Candler faculty elected to offer admission to female students, despite the fact that the Methodist Episcopal Church, South did not offer a path to ordination for women. It was not until 1938 that Mary Vaughn Johnson became the first woman to be awarded Emory's bachelor of divinity degree.

The United States' involvement in World War II decreased enrollment at Candler, and focused the school's training of remaining students for military chaplaincy, a vocation that half of the graduating class of 1943 pursued. Kiyoshi Tanimoto, a 1940 graduate of Candler, was serving a Methodist church in Hiroshima when the atomic bomb is dropped. Tanimoto later devoted his life to helping the survivors and speaking out for nuclear disarmament.

Despite the U.S. Supreme Court's Brown v. Board of Education decision in 1954, Georgia resisted attempts at racial integration. In 1957, 80 white religious leaders signed what became known as the "Ministers' Manifesto" calling for an end to segregation in the city's schools. A year later, Atlanta newspapers published another open letter from Emory faculty and administrators reiterating the need to integrate the public schools; nearly the entire theology faculty signed the letter. In 1965, Candler's first black student, Otis Turner, enrolled.

In 1971, Charles Gerkin led the design of a three-year program of supervised ministry as a curriculum requirement. In addition to field placements at sites ranging from hospitals and homeless shelters to local churches, the program also included time for reflection seminars led by faculty. This program came to be known as Contextual Education, or ConEd. In 1974, the Anglican Studies program began. Later renamed Episcopal Studies, the program is the oldest university-based Episcopal ministry education program in the country.

In 1975, Candler librarian Channing Jeschke persuaded Dean James T. Laney to purchase the Hartford Theological Seminary library collection, which grew the library's holdings from 90,000 volumes to more than 300,000. That same year, the theology building began renovations to serve as a library for the new collection. In 1976, the building was renamed Pitts Theology Library in recognition of Margaret Pitts and her father, William I.H. Pitts, and the Pitts Foundation's assistance in purchasing the Hartford collection.

In 1978, Roberta C. Bondi became the first female faculty member on the tenure track of the theology school. Though Candler had employed female visiting professors and untenured lecturers, Bondi's appointment marked the first time a woman was officially on faculty.

That same year, Paul Rudolph was retained to design a new chapel, and in 1979, U.S. President Jimmy Carter presided over the groundbreaking of Cannon Chapel, named in honor of former dean William R. Cannon.

In 1990, Robert M. Franklin, Jr. launched Candler's Black Church Studies Program. Franklin later would become president of Morehouse College and returned to Candler in 2014 as the inaugural James T. and Berta R. Laney Chair of Moral Leadership.

In 1991, the Program in Women's Studies was launched under part-time director Kris Kvam; it would later be renamed the Program for Women in Theology and Ministry. That same year, Nancy Ammerman founded Candler's Baptist Studies Program. In 2007, Jan Love became Candler's first female dean.

Candler School of Theology observed its centennial in the 2014–2015 academic year with a series of events that acknowledged Candler's contributions to theological education and to the church during the past 100 years; its role within and contribution to Emory University during the past 100 years; its vision for addressing the challenges and opportunities facing theology in the 21st century; and the accomplishments of Candler's faculty, alumni and friends/donors.

Three members of the faculty are fellows of the American Academy of Arts and Sciences: E. Brooks Holifield, Carol A. Newsom, and Carl R. Holladay.

Jonathan Strom, a Professor of Church History and historian of Pietism at Candler School of Theology, succeeded Jan Love as the Mary Lee Hardin Willard Dean on August 1, 2024. Terrence L. (Kojo) Johnson succeeded Jonathan Strom as Mary Lee Hardin Willard Dean on August 1, 2026.

== Academics ==
=== Degrees and Accreditation ===
Candler School of Theology has been accredited by the Association of Theological Schools in the United States and Canada (ATS) since 1938. In addition, Emory University is accredited by the Commission on Colleges of the Southern Association of Colleges and Schools to award degrees at the associate, bachelor's, master's and doctoral levels.

- Master of Divinity (M.Div.)
- Master of Arts in Religion and Leadership (MARL)
- Master of Religion and Public Life (MRPL)
- Master of Theological Studies (MTS)
- Master of Theology (Th.M.)
- Doctor of Ministry (D.Min.)

Candler School of Theology offers dual degrees in Bioethics, Business, Development Practice, Law, and Public Health with other graduate schools at Emory University.

=== Contextual Education ===
Candler School of Theology's Contextual Education program integrates coursework, supervised field experience and pastor-led reflection groups. Master of Divinity students are required to fulfill placements in both clinical or social ministry settings in their first year and in ecclesial settings their second year.

=== International- and U.S.-based study ===
Candler School of Theology students may participate in academic programs at international and domestic theological institutions, including the General Theological Seminary, New York City; the National Capital Semester for Seminarians, Washington, D.C.; Methodist University of São Paulo, Brazil; the University of Helsinki, Finland; the University of Göttingen, Germany; LMU Munich, Germany; Kwame Nkrumah University of Science and Technology, Ghana; St. Paul's University, Kenya; Methodist Theological University (MTU), Korea; Evangelical Seminary of Puerto Rico; University of St. Andrew, St Mary's College, School of Divinity, Scotland; Trinity Theological College, Singapore; University of KwaZulu Natal, South Africa; University College Stockholm, Sweden; Wesley House – University of Cambridge, United Kingdom; and Africa University, Zimbabwe.

== Programs ==
=== Baptist Studies ===
Candler School of Theology's Baptist Studies program prepares students for ordination in the Baptist Church. Candler students enrolled in the Master of Divinity (MDiv) degree program may earn a certificate in Baptist Studies.

=== Black Church Studies ===
Candler School of Theology's Black Church Studies program prepares students for leadership in black and multiracial churches; and teaches the origins, development and contemporary diversity of the black church tradition. Candler students enrolled in the Master of Divinity or Master of Theological Studies degree programs may earn a certificate in Black Church Studies. In addition, the program sponsors events and lectures on black religious life, including the Howard Thurman Lecture, the Anna Julia Cooper Lecture, and the Sankofa Scholar program.

=== Catholic Studies ===
Candler's Catholic Studies Program prepares leaders and scholars for lay ministry in the Catholic Church and research in the Catholic intellectual tradition. Candler students in masters programs may choose to pursue a certificate in Catholic Studies.

=== Episcopal Studies ===
Candler School of Theology's Episcopal Studies program prepares students for ministry in The Episcopal Church and all the churches in the Anglican Communion. Candler students enrolled in the Master of Divinity degree program who are preparing for ordained parish ministry under the supervision of a bishop may earn a certificate in Episcopal Studies.

=== Methodist Studies ===
Candler School of Theology's Methodist Studies program offers a range of courses in Methodist studies, stewards denominational and conference relations, mentors candidates seeking ordination and organizes denominational activities.

=== Religious Education Ministries ===
Candler School of Theology's Religious Education Ministries program prepares students for educational leadership in congregations, schools and communities. Candler students enrolled in the Master of Divinity, Master of Religious Leadership or Master of Theological Studies degree programs may earn a certificate in Religious Education Ministries. In addition, the program partners with the Youth Theological Initiative.

=== Women, Theology, and Ministry ===
Candler School of Theology's Women, Theology, and Ministry program educates women and men to be leaders and advocates for the well being of girls and women in the church and in the world. Candler students enrolled in the Master of Divinity or Master of Theological Studies degree programs may earn a certificate in Women, Theology, and Ministry. In addition, the program sponsors lectures, events and networking opportunities.

=== Continuing Education ===
Candler School of Theology offers continuing education for individuals not enrolled in a degree program through Candler course auditing, seminars, certifications and other theology courses.

=== United Methodist Course of Study ===
The Course of Study School at Emory educates and trains local pastors in The United Methodist Church, and is sponsored by The United Methodist Church, the General Board of Higher Education and Ministry, the Southeastern Jurisdictional Administrative Council, and Candler School of Theology.

== Pitts Theology Library ==
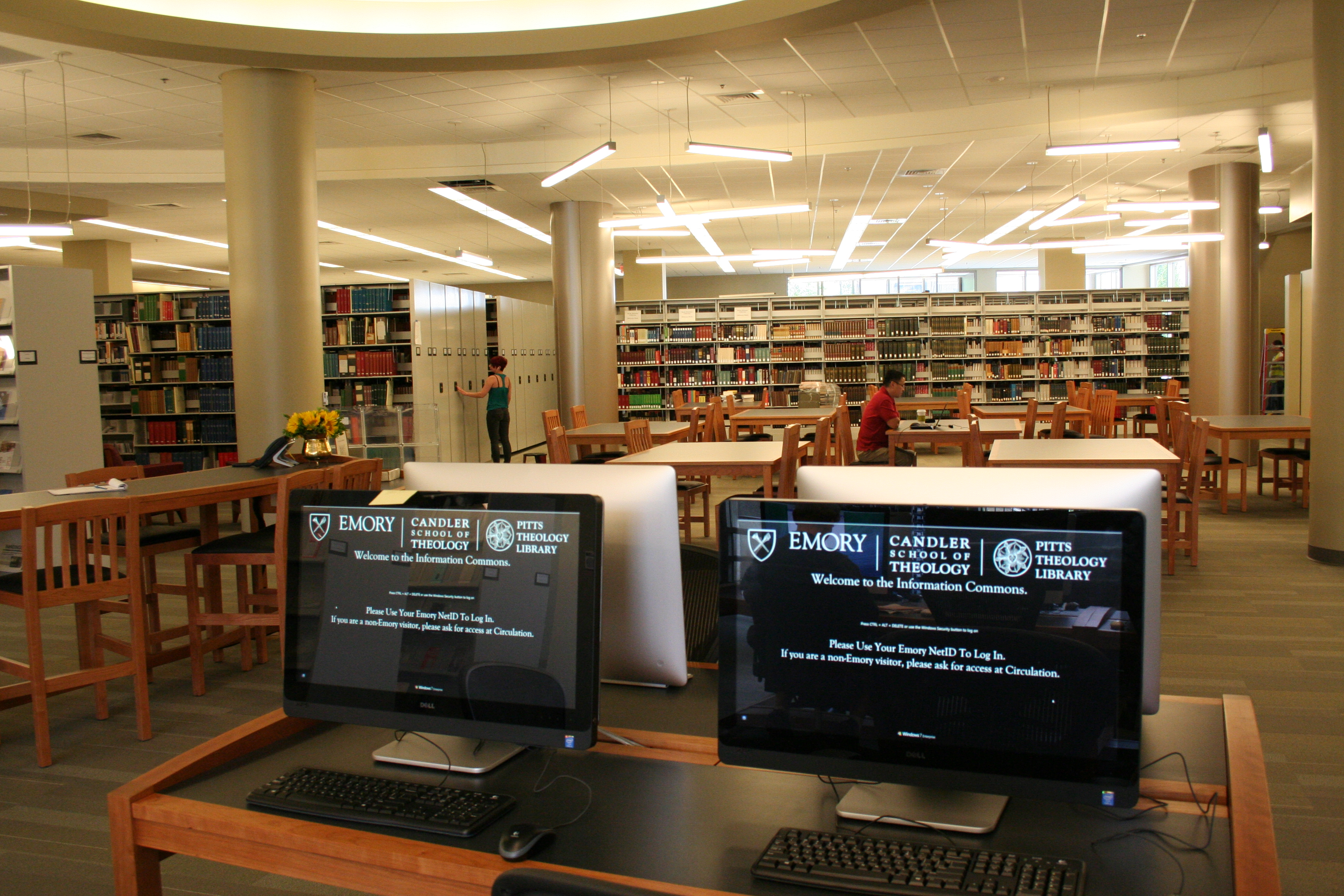
Pitts Theology Library, main floor

Margaret A. Pitts, a devout Methodist and supporter of its educational institutions, was responsible for much of the library's growth, providing substantial gifts for new acquisitions. In 1976, the library was named in honor of Pitts and her father, W. I. H. Pitts.

== Institutes and Initiatives ==
=== Youth Theological Initiative ===
In 1993, Dr. Craig Dykstra partnered with Candler School of Theology and Lilly Endowment, Inc. to create the Youth Theological Initiative. Since then, the program has focused on developing theologically-grounded, socially-conscious ministries with youth and young adults, by educating and preparing youth ministers, and leading a summer program for high school students to engage in justice-seeking theological education. In addition, the Initiative conducts research into the theological perspectives of youth.

=== World Methodist Evangelism Institute ===
The World Methodist Evangelism Institute provides opportunities for pastors and lay persons to earn continuing education credits while gaining experience in evangelism in other cultures, offers training in faith-sharing in a non-confrontational approach, and provides opportunities for seminary students to engage with students from other seminaries across the world. Since its founding in 1982, this joint ministry of Candler School of Theology and the World Methodist Council has sponsored 59 major seminars in more than 121 countries around the world.

=== Candler School of Theology Honor's Day ===
A variety of prizes in recognition of vocational and academic achievements by students and staff are awarded annually at the annual Honor's Day. Awards for vocational excellence and community service include the Claude H. Thompson Award for work in the area of justice and reconciliation, the Berta and James T. Laney Award in Contextual Education, the Charles Owen Smith Award, the Fellowship Seminarian Award, the Hoyt Hickman Award, the Community Service Award, the John Owen Smith Award, the Ruth Sewell Flowers Award, the Pitts Theology Library Student Research Award, and the Frederick Buechner Prize for Excellence in Preaching.

Awards for academic excellence include the United Methodist Foundation for Christian Higher Education Award, the United Methodist First Career Seminary Award, the United Methodist Scholarship Seminary Award, the Myki Mobley Award, the Nolan B. Harmon Award, the John D. and Alice Slay Award, the Chad Davis Memorial Award, the Boone M. Bowen Award, the Russell E. Richey Award, the G. Ray Jordan Award, and the Academic Excellence Awards.

== Buildings and Facilities ==
=== Rita Anne Rollins Building (Phase I) ===
Completed in 2008, the 65,000-square-foot Rita Anne Rollins Building houses Candler School of Theology classrooms, administrative and faculty offices, community gathering spaces, and Emory's Center for Ethics. The building supports SMART technology and reflects Emory's architectural style and its commitment to sustainability, featuring Italianate design with marble and stucco exteriors and a clay tile roof, as well as LEED silver certification from the U.S. Green Building Council.

In recognition of the support of the O. Wayne Rollins Foundation of Atlanta, Emory University named Phase I of the new Candler School of Theology building in memory of the late Rita Anne Rollins.

Candler School of Theology's Phase II building project was completed in August 2014 and connects the classrooms and administrative offices in the Rita Anne Rollins Building with the Pitts Theology Library, as well as the Wesley Teaching Chapel, new group study rooms for students, a glassed-in atrium and an outdoor plaza.

The building is located at 1531 Dickey Drive.

=== Candler School of Theology Building (Phase II) ===
Candler's Phase II building project is connected to the Rita Anne Rollins Building. Completed in August 2014, the building includes a new home for Pitts Theology Library, an exhibit gallery, an 80-seat lecture hall, the Wesley Teaching Chapel, group study rooms, a glassed-in atrium, an outdoor plaza and office space for Candler's IT staff and Pitts Library staff.

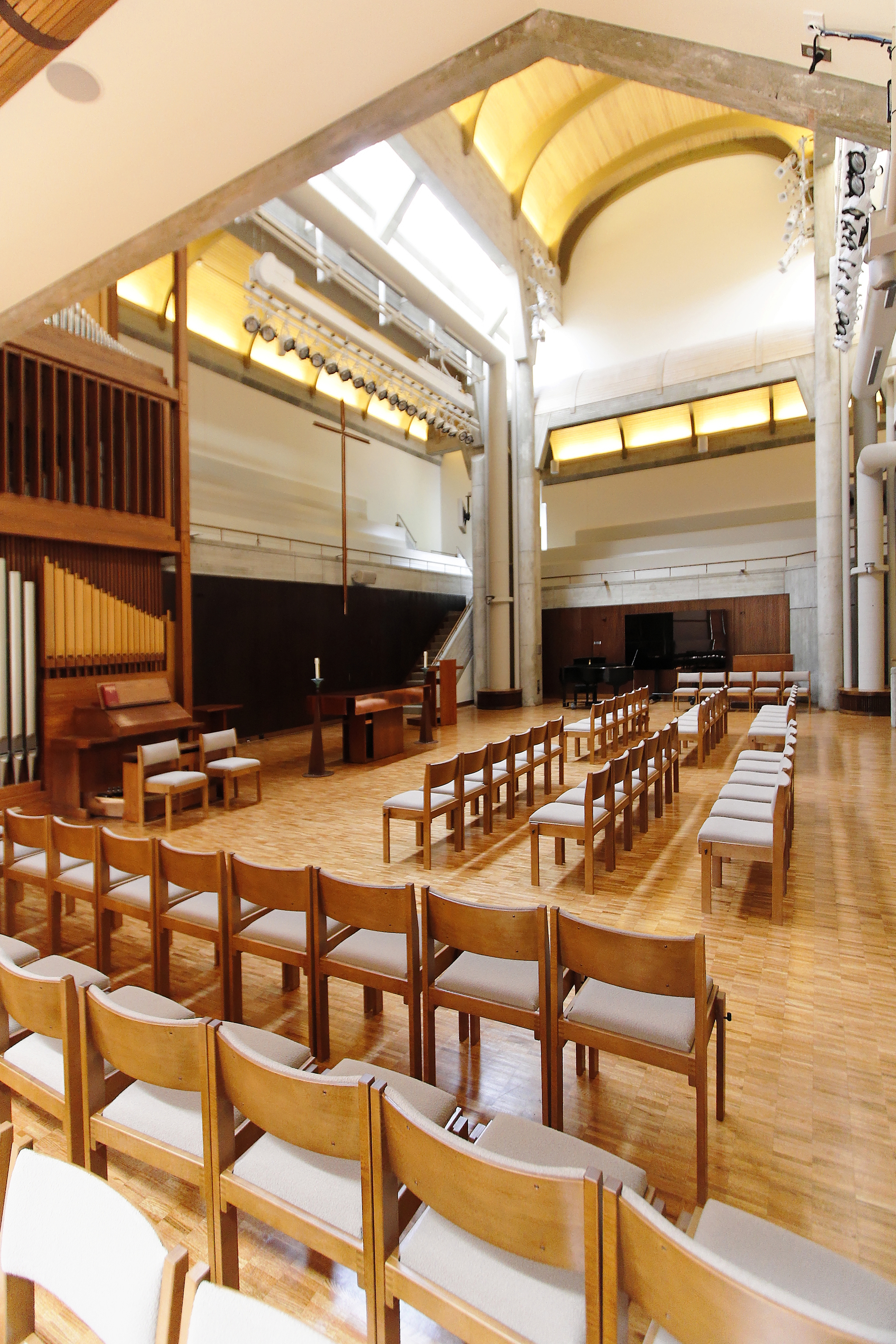
Cannon Chapel interior

=== Cannon Chapel ===
Cannon Chapel is named for William R. Cannon.

== Swanson Art at Candler ==
Candler School of Theology holds an extensive collection of the work of Los Angeles artist John August Swanson.

== Affiliated Organizations ==
The Aquinas Center of Theology, the Center for the Study of Law and Religion, the Graduate Division of Religion, Methodist Review, Office of Religious Life, and the Practical Matters Journal are among many organizations at Emory or affiliated with the university that are associated with the work and programs of Candler.

== Notable alumni and faculty ==
- Nancy Ammerman, Former Candler Faculty; Launched the Baptist Studies program at Candler School of Theology
- Arthur James Armstrong, Elected in 1968 to become the youngest United Methodist Bishop in the United States
- Ed Bacon, Rector emeritus of All Saints Episcopal Church, Pasadena, California
- Immanuel Ben-Dor, Candler professor (1957-1969); First Jewish professor on the Candler Faculty
- Peggy Billings, First female faculty, as visiting professor, in 1973
- Richard E. Blanchard, Sr. 49BD, Methodist pastor; Writer of the Gospel song Fill My Cup Lord
- Roberta C. Bondi, Professor Emeritus of Church History (1978-2006); First woman to hold a tenured faculty position at Candler School of Theology
- William Ragsdale Cannon, Dean of Candler (1953–1968); United Methodist Bishop; Cannon Chapel is named in his honor
- Rebecca Chopp, Candler faculty (1987-); First female provost of Emory (1997); President of Colgate University; President of Swarthmore College
- Fred B. Craddock, Bandy Distinguished Professor of Preaching and New Testament Emeritus
- Susan T. Henry-Crowe 76T, United Methodist denominational leader; Pioneer in multi-faith chaplaincy at institutions of higher learning
- Plato Tracy Durham, First Dean of Candler (1914-1918)
- Nancy Eiesland 91T 95, Associate Professor of Sociology of Religion (1995-2009); Wrote The Disabled God: Toward a Liberatory Theology of Disability, considered a foundational text in disability studies
- Robert M. Franklin, Jr., James T. and Berta R. Laney Professor in Moral Leadership; President Emeritus of Morehouse College (2007-2012)
- Teresa L. Fry Brown, Professor of Homiletics and Director of Black Church Studies; First African American woman to attain the rank of full professor at Candler School of Theology
- James W. Fowler, C.H. Candler Professor Emeritus of Theology and Human Development (1977-2015); Founded Emory University's Center for Ethics
- Charles V. Gerkin, Candler Professor; Created Candler's supervised ministry program, now known as contextual education
- Justo L. González, Former Candler Faculty
- E. Brooks Holifield, Charles Howard Candler Professor of American Church History, Emeritus, AAAS Fellow
- Tricia Hersey, founder of the Nap Ministry
- Earl Gladstone Hunt, Jr., Bishop of The Methodist Church and the United Methodist Church; Previously President of Emory and Henry College
- Mary Vaughn Johnson, First Woman to graduate from Candler School of Theology
- Lewis Bevel Jones III 49T, United Methodist Bishop
- Bernice Albertine King 88T – Daughter of famed African-American civil rights leader, Martin Luther King Jr. and Coretta Scott King; CEO of The King Center
- R. Kevin LaGree, Dean of Candler (1991–1999)
- James T. Laney, Dean of Candler (1969–1977); President of Emory University; Ambassador to Korea
- Jan Love, Dean of Candler (2007–present); First woman to serve as dean of the school
- William Mallard, Candler faculty emeriti; the Bill Mallard Lay Theology Institute at Candler is named in his honor
- Jane Dammen McAuliffe, Former Candler faculty; First scholar of Islam at Candler; President of Bryn Mawr College
- Ian A. McFarland, Robert W. Woodruff Professor of Theology (2019–), Bishop Mack B. and Rose Stokes Chair of Theology (2005-2015)
- Jürgen Moltmann, Visiting professor (1983–1993)
- Carol A. Newsom, Charles Howard Candler Professor of Old Testament; Director of the Graduate Division of Religion; Dead Sea Scrolls scholar, AAAS Fellow
- Doug Moseley, Retired Methodist minister; Former member of the Kentucky State Senate
- David L. Petersen, Franklin N. Parker Professor of Old Testament (faculty emeriti)
- William A. Shelton, Original Candler faculty member; His collection of artifacts from the Middle East became the basis for the Michael C. Carlos Museum
- Andrew Sledd, Original Candler faculty member; Public theologian for racial justice
- Wyatt Aiken Smart, Original Candler faculty member; Emory University's first chaplain
- Luther E. Smith, Jr., Professor Emeritus of Church and Community; Scholar; Advocate for civil and human rights
- Franklin Nutting Parker, Dean of Candler (1919–1937)
- Russell E. Richey, Dean of Candler (2000–2006)
- Don E. Saliers, Theologian-in-Residence (2014–); Retired in 2007 as the William R. Cannon Distinguished Professor of Theology and Worship
- Grant Shockley, First full-time African-American faculty member in 1971
- Mack B. Stokes, Candler Professor (1941–1972); Founding director of Emory's Graduate Division of Religion
- Kiyoshi Tanimoto 40T, Theologian; Humanitarian dedicated to nuclear disarmament
- Henry Burton Trimble, Dean of Candler (1937–1953)
- Danielle Tumminio Hansen, professor of practical theology and spiritual care
- Otis Turner, First African-American student at Candler; Developed policies for racial justice on behalf of the Presbyterian Church (USA)
- Desmond Tutu, 1984 Nobel Laureate and Anglican archbishop; Past visiting professor of theology (1991; 1998-2000)
- James L. Waits, Dean of Candler (1978-1991)
- James M. Wall 55T, Editor, The Christian Century
- Heather Warren 82T, First woman from Emory University to win a Rhodes scholarship
- Woodie W. White, Bishop-in-Residence; United Methodist Bishop; Civil Rights activist
- Donald Wildmon 65T, Author; Former radio host; Founder and chairman of the American Family Association.
