= Warren Akin Candler =

American bishop, college president

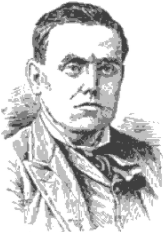

Chancellor of Emory University
- In office 1914–1922

President of Emory College
- In office 1888–1898

Personal details
- Born: August 23, 1857; Villa Rica, Georgia
- Died: September 25, 1941 (aged 84); Atlanta, Georgia
- Spouse: Sarah Antoinette Curtright (m. 1877)
- Children: 5
- Education: Emory College
- Occupation: Clergyman, educator

Warren Akin Candler (August 23, 1857 – September 25, 1941) was an American bishop of the Methodist Episcopal Church, South, elected in 1898. He was the tenth president of Emory University.

== Early life ==
He was born in Villa Rica, Georgia, the tenth of eleven children born to Samuel and Martha Bernetta Beall Candler. Samuel was a prosperous merchant and planter. Their children were raised in a devout atmosphere.

Candler attended Emory College in Oxford, Georgia, from 1874 to 1877 and was a brother of Epsilon chapter of the Kappa Alpha Order. There he discovered his religious vocation and quite a talent for preaching. As a result, he made the Methodist Episcopal Church, South, the center of his life.

After college, Warren married Sarah Antoinette "Nettie" Curtright on November 21, 1877. The couple had five children, three of whom lived to adulthood.

== Ministerial career ==
As a young pastor, Candler served several churches in northwest Georgia. In 1882, along with Bishop George Foster Pierce of the M.E. Church, South, and Bishop Lucius Holsey of the Colored (now Christian) M.E. Church, and others, Candler helped found Paine Institute (now Paine College) in Augusta, Georgia. Paine's mission was the higher education of African Americans. As a longtime member of Paine's Board of Trustees, Candler supported the hiring of African Americans to teach, thus helping to create a racially-integrated faculty, unusual in the post-Civil War South.

From 1886 until 1888 Rev. Candler served in Nashville, Tennessee, as the Assistant Editor of the Nashville Christian Advocate, the primary periodical of the Methodist Episcopal Church, South. In this capacity he supported at least some of the goals of the evangelical Holiness Association, though also fearing it might become divisive.

His next assignment was as the tenth President of Emory College. The students nicknamed him "Shorty." He advanced firmly conservative views at Emory. For example, he phased out technical training, implementing a liberal arts curriculum. He also improved the school's finances and increased the size of its faculty.

== Episcopal career ==
Candler was elected a bishop by the General Conference of the M.E. Church, South in 1898. As bishop he became concerned with missionary enterprises among other denominational matters.

Bishop Candler also served as spiritual advisor to his brother, Asa Griggs Candler, founder of the Coca-Cola Company. As such, Warren encouraged Asa's support of church causes, particularly Emory. Indeed, the creation of Emory University in Atlanta was enabled largely through the financial backing of Asa.

== Emory University ==
Emory University's formation came about when Bishop Candler and some of his colleagues, members of the Board of Trustees of Vanderbilt University, Nashville, Tennessee, lost influence over that institution. After an unsuccessful 1910 lawsuit to regain their authority, the M.E. Church, South, decided instead to establish two new educational institutions, which would be under their control.

The first of these new Methodist educational institutions was Southern Methodist University in Dallas, Texas. The other was to be located somewhere east of the Mississippi River. The Candler brothers combined their influence and resources to win this role for Emory College. Indeed, Asa wrote a check for $1 million to defray the expenses of moving Emory's campus from Oxford, Georgia, to land he donated in the Druid Hills development, which is now part of Atlanta.

Bishop Candler became the first Chancellor of the new Emory University in 1914. As such he fought for traditional values, forbidding such activities as dramatics clubs and intercollegiate athletics. In addition to the School of Theology, Emory established Law and Medical Schools, and opened a University Hospital, as well. Candler's hope of establishing a School of Education, however, never came to fruition.

Bishop Candler expended great efforts raising funds for Emory. Indeed, though he expressed his desire to retire as Chancellor in 1918, he did not step down until 1922. He remained active as a University Trustee until 1937.

== Theological writing ==
For three decades Candler wrote a column in the Atlanta Journal. He also wrote many articles for religious publications, and fifteen books on biographical and religious topics. His thinking reflected traditionalism tempered by religious idealism. Although he wrote of his belief in Anglo-Saxon superiority, Candler also spoke out very strongly against lynching, for example. In his writings, Candler espoused a paternalistic relationship toward African Americans, and believed that Southern whites had both an obligation to support the education of a "better" class of African American leaders in the South, and to prevent more radical voices from taking the lead in this area. Candler was a member and later President of the Board of Trustees at the historically black Paine College in Augusta, GA, which opened in 1882 under the auspices of M. E. Church, South. While not a critic of the American economic system, per se, he did oppose the power of trusts and condemned covetousness in general. A supporter of the traditional Christian creed, he also sought to mitigate the conflict between science and religion. Candler was also outspoken in his opposition to women's suffrage.

== Methodist reunification ==
Bishop Candler opposed the reunification of the M.E. and M.E. Church, South. These two denominations divided in 1844 over the issues of slavery and episcopal prerogative. Nevertheless, proponents of reunification persuaded the General Conference of the M.E. Church, South, to establish a rule requiring the retirement of Bishops who had reached the age of seventy-two. This rule removed Candler and another opponent of reunification in 1934, thus paving the way to reunification in 1939.

Nevertheless, Candler continued to write, and announced his intention to "preach until I die." He received many honors and gestures of public affection throughout his Episcopal career, including the gift of a Franklin sedan. Warren Akin Candler died at his home in Atlanta on September 25, 1941, being buried in a cemetery adjacent to the Emory campus. Nettie, his wife of more than sixty years, died two years later.

Emory's Candler School of Theology is named in honor of him. Candler College, a prestigious high school located in Havana, Cuba, was also named for him, as was Candler Hospital (Savannah) in Savannah, now known as St. Joseph's/Candler.

== Written works ==
- The History of Sunday-Schools: A Brief Historical Treatise, with Special Reference to the Sunday-Schools of America (1880)
- Georgia's Educational Work: What It Has Been, What It Should Be (1893)
- Christus Auctor: A Manual of Christian Evidences (1900)
- High Living and High Lives (1901)
- Wesley and his Work (1912)
- Kingdom of God's Dear Son (1921)
- Life of Thomas Coke (1923)
- Current Comments on Timely Topics (1926)
- Bishop Charles Betts Galloway: A Prince of Preachers and Christian Statesman (1927)
- Christ and the Creed (1927)
- Easter Meditations (1930)
- Young J. Allen: The Man Who Seeded China (1931)

== Biographies ==
- Bauman, Mark K., Warren Akin Candler: The Conservative as Idealist, Metuchen, N.J.: Scarecrow Press, 1981.
- Kemp, Kathryn W., "Warren Akin Candler", The New Georgia Encyclopedia, The Georgia Humanities Council and The University of Georgia Press, 2004-06. retrieved May 2, 2006

== See also ==
- List of bishops of the United Methodist Church
