= List of faculty and alumni of Emory University =

This is a list of influential and newsworthy people affiliated with Emory University, a private university in Atlanta. The list includes professors, staff, graduates, and former students belonging to one of Emory's two undergraduate or seven graduate schools.

== Alumni ==
Selected Emory people

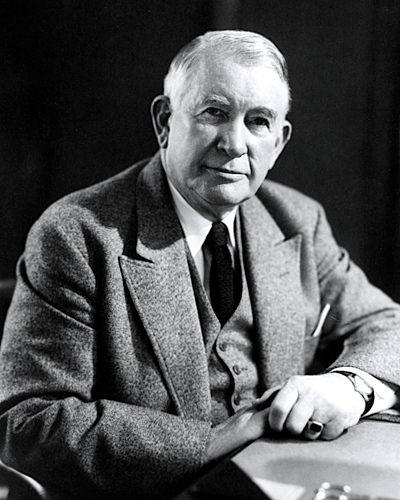
Alben Barkley (1900C, 1949H), 35th vice president of the United States

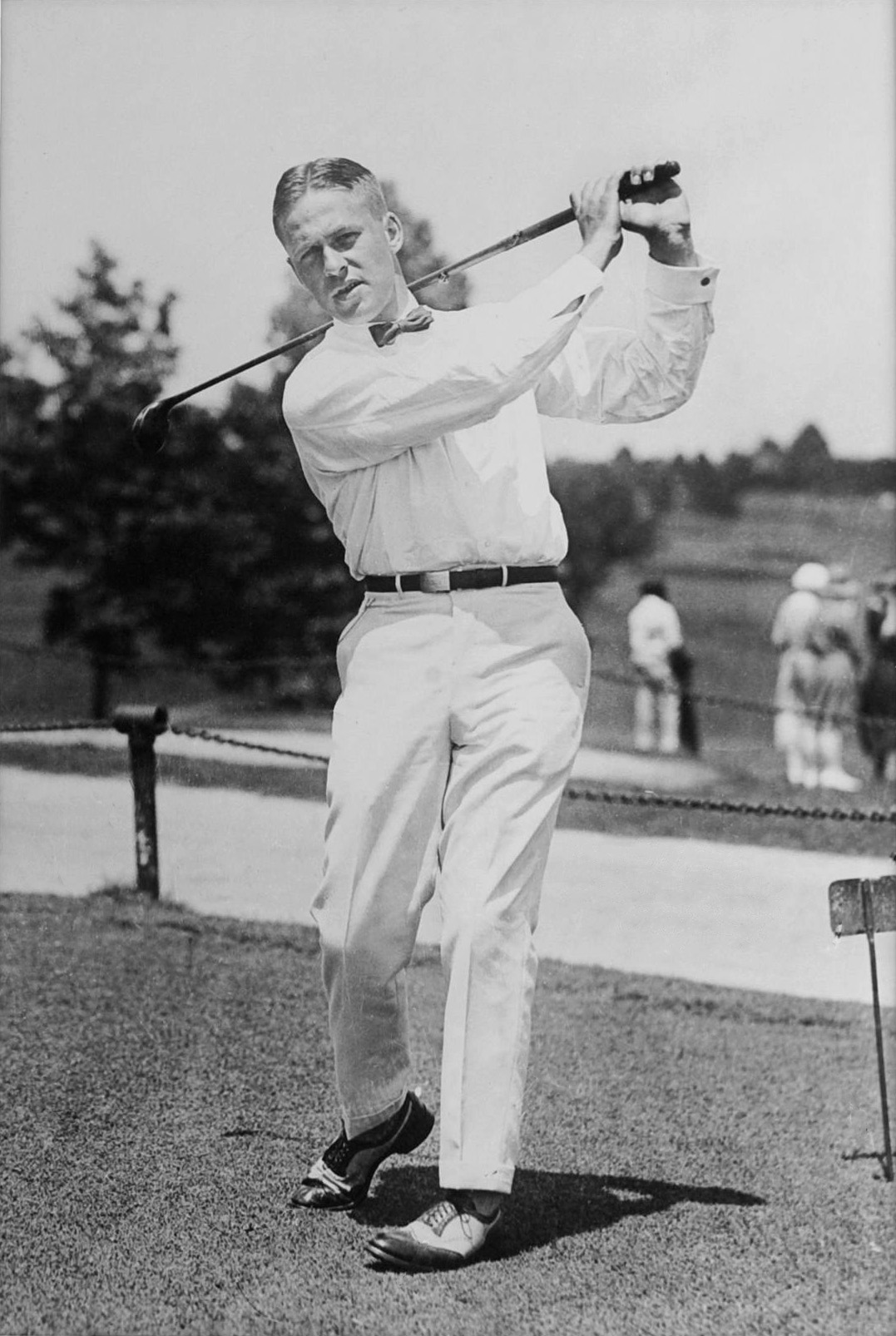
Iconic golfer Bobby Jones (1929JD)

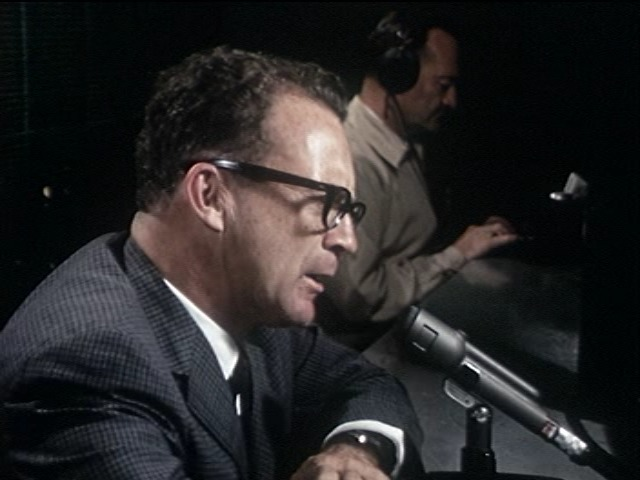
Baseball broadcaster Ernie Harwell (1940C)

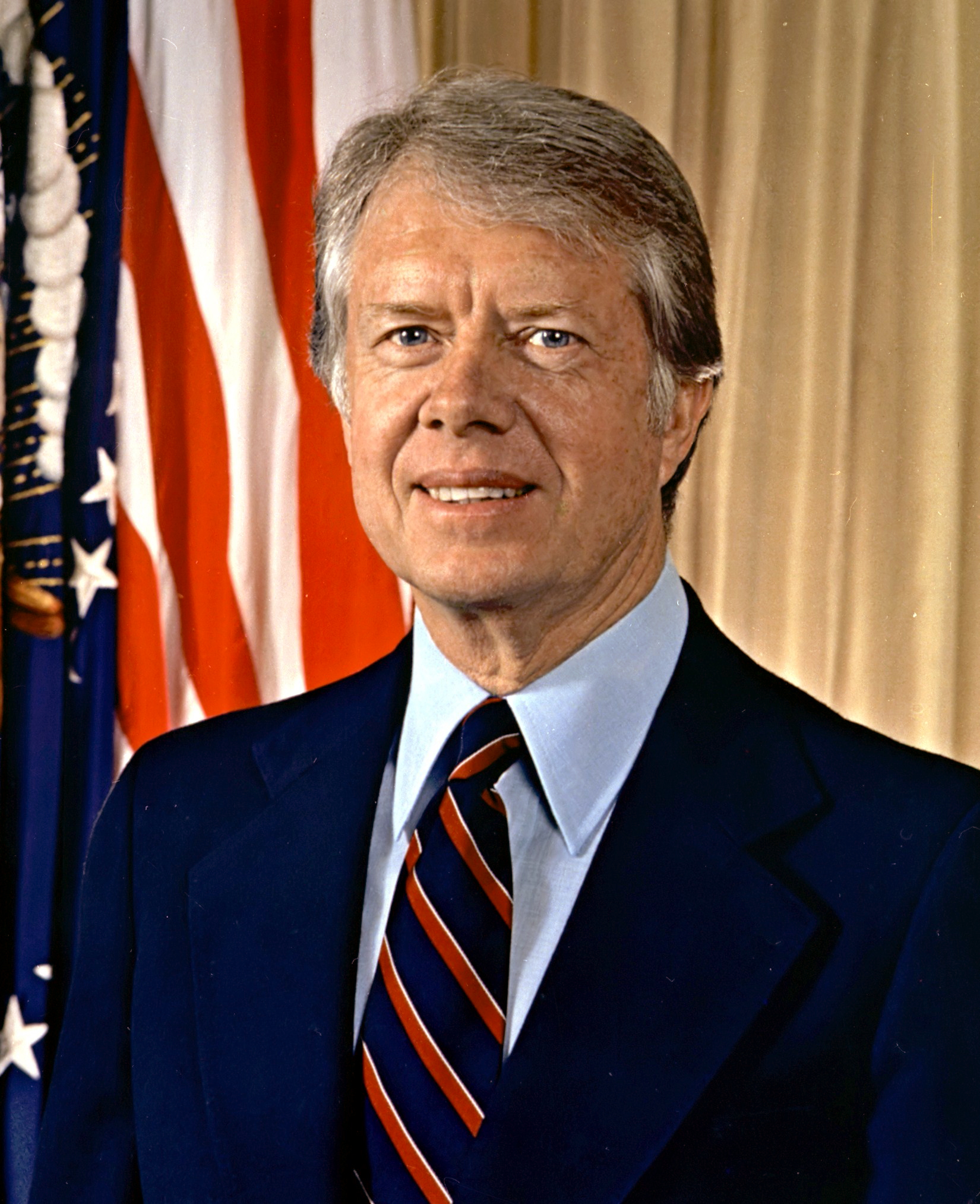
Jimmy Carter, 39th president of the United States and University Distinguished Professor

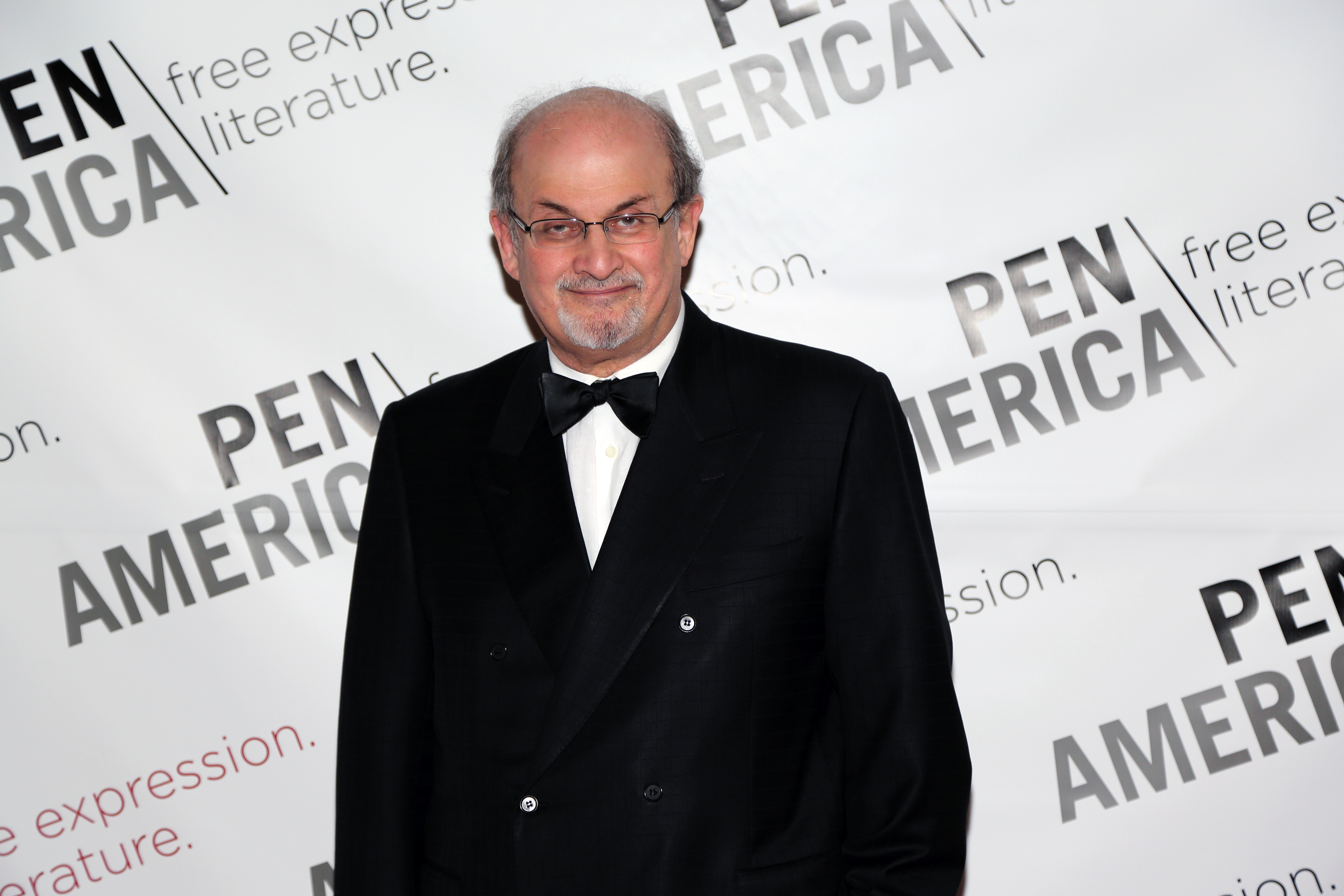
Salman Rushdie, iconic novelist and University Distinguished Professor

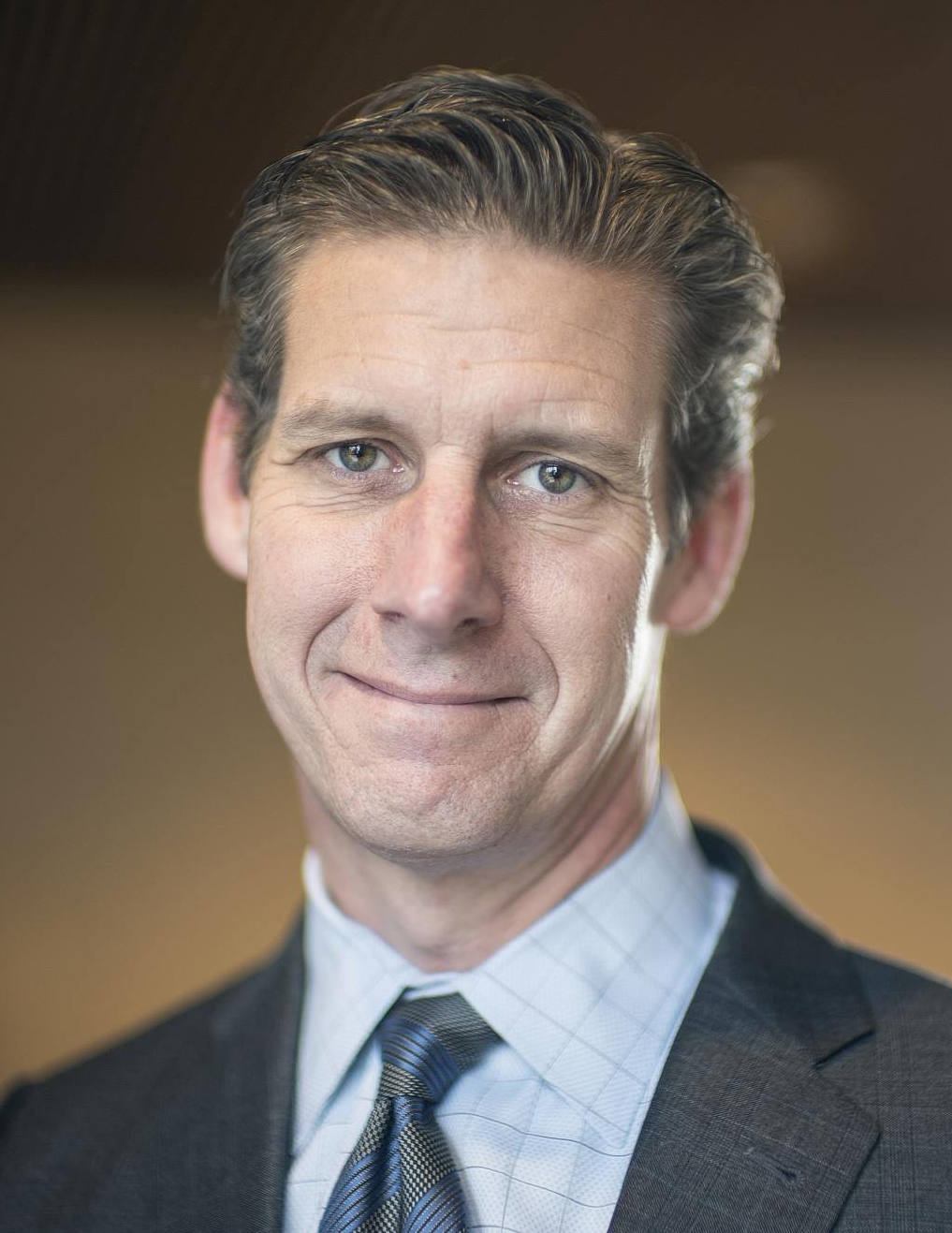
Kai Rysdall, radio journalist the host of Marketplace

=== Pulitzer Prize ===
- Ellen Gabler (BA 2003) – investigative reporter for the New York Times; member of a team awarded the 2018 Pulitzer Prize for Public Service
- Louis R. Harlan (BA 1943) – American historian and academic, winner of the Pulitzer Prize in 1984
- Frank Main (BA 1986) – Pulitzer Prize-winning (2011) reporter for the Chicago Sun Times
- Dumas Malone (BA 1910) – 1975 Pulitzer Prize-winning historian, former head of Harvard University Press and Presidential Medal of Freedom recipient
- David M. Potter (BA 1931) – Southern historian and Pulitzer Prize winner (1977)
- Claude Sitton (BA 1943) – Pulitzer Prize winner (1983) and former New York Times national editor
- C. Vann Woodward (BA 1930) – 1982 Pulitzer Prize-winning historian

=== Academia ===
==== Presidents of academic institutions ====
- Philip A. Amerson (PhD 1976) – president of Garrett-Evangelical Theological Seminary
- Ivan Loveridge Bennett (BA 1943, MD 1946) – physician, dean of the NYU School of Medicine, president of New York University 1980–1981
- Robert G. Bottoms (BD 1969) – former president of DePauw University
- Marion L. Brittain (BA 1886) – academic administrator, president of the Georgia Institute of Technology 1922–1944
- Charles Paul Conn (MA, PhD) – president of Lee University in Cleveland, Tennessee
- James H. Daughdrill Jr. (BA 1956) – 18th president of Rhodes College
- Nivia Fernández Hernández (MMSc 1979) – interim president of the University of Puerto Rico
- Arthur Hollis Edens (BA 1928, MA 1938) – 3rd president of Duke University
- Andrew D. Holt (BA 1927) – 16th president of the University of Tennessee
- Isaac Stiles Hopkins (bachelor's degree 1859) – first president of the Georgia Institute of Technology
- Robert Stewart Hyer (BA 1881, MA 1882) – president of Southwestern University, first president of Southern Methodist University, educator and researcher in Texas, noted for experimenting with early x-ray and telegraphy equipment
- James F. Jones (master's degree) – 21st president of Trinity College, Hartford, Connecticut
- Howard Lamar (BA 1945) – former dean of Yale College and former president of Yale University
- Michael Lomax (PhD 1984) – president and chief executive officer of the United Negro College Fund, former president of Dillard University (1997–2004)
- Ward B. Pafford (BA) – 3rd president of the University of West Georgia
- Luis M. Proenza – 15th president of the University of Akron
- Henry King Stanford (BA) – 19th president of the University of Georgia and 3rd president of the University of Miami
- G. Gabrielle Starr (BA 1993, MA 1993) – president of Pomona College in Claremont, California
- Robert M. Strozier – former president of Florida State University
- Frederick Palmer Whiddon (PhD 1963) – founder and first president of the University of South Alabama

==== Professors ====
- Amalia Amaki (MA, PhD) – artist, art historian
- Randall Auxier (PhD 1992) – professor of philosophy at Southern Illinois University
- Enoch Marvin Banks (BA 1897, MA 1900) – academic historian at the University of Florida
- Jim Chen (BA, MA) – dean of the University of Louisville, Louis D. Brandeis School of Law
- Tressie McMillan Cottom (MA, PhD 2015) – professor of sociology, columnist
- Don H. Compier (PhD 1992) – founding dean of the Community of Christ Seminary, Graceland University
- Rick Durrett (BS 1972, MS 1973) – mathematician, professor emeritus at Duke University
- Cherry Logan Emerson (BA 1938, MA 1939) – Cherry L. Emerson Center for Scientific Computation founder and distinguished faculty member
- Etta Falconer (PhD 1969) – educator and mathematician, one of the first female African-American PhDs in math
- Elizabeth Price Foley (BA 1987) – legal theorist
- Ted Gayer (BA 1992) – economist, associate professor at Georgetown Public Policy Institute
- Margot Gayle (MS Bacteriology) – former American historic preservationist and author
- Lassie Goodbread-Black (MA 1944) – farmer and educator; in 1925, became the first woman to enroll at the University of Florida
- Louis R. Harlan (BA 1943) – historian and academic, winner of the Pulitzer Prize in 1984
- Valerie Horsley (PhD 2003) – biologist
- William Kelso (PhD 1971) – archaeologist, director of research and interpretation for the Preservation Virginia (APVA) Jamestown Rediscovery project
- Ben Konop (BA) – Lucas County commissioner, attorney and law professor at Ohio Northern University, Pettit College of Law and the University of Toledo College of Law
- Amy Malek (BA 2003) – professor, scholar, and sociocultural anthropologist; department chair and director at Oklahoma State University, Stillwater
- Magali Cornier Michael (MA, PhD) – feminist literary scholar, professor of English, and current chair of the English Department at Duquesne University
- Jacob Mincer (BA 1950) – "father" of labor economics and Chicago School member
- Howard W. Odum (BA 1904) – sociologist
- Susan Pharr (BA 1966) – academic in the field of political science, Japanologist
- Elaine Reese (PhD) – academic psychologist, focuses on early language acquisition
- James I. Robertson, Jr. (MA 1956, PhD 1959) – scholar on the American Civil War, professor at Virginia Tech
- Jeffrey Burton Russell (PhD) – American historian and religious studies scholar
- Barton C. Shaw (PhD) – historian, professor at Cedar Crest College
- Christopher Snyder (MA, PhD) – professor of European history and director of the National Celtic Heritage Center at Marymount University
- India Thusi – law professor at Indiana University Bloomington
- Melissa Wade (BA 1972, MA 1976, M.T.S. 1996, Th. M 2000) – debate coach and leader in the Urban debate league movement, director of Forensics and the Barkley Forum at Emory University

=== Business ===
- Nelson Adams (internship 1979 and residency 1982) – physician, president of the National Medical Association, founder and president of Access Health Solutions, LLC
- Ely Callaway (BA 1940) – founder of Callaway Golf
- Mitch Caplan (MBA, JD) – former CEO of E-Trade
- John W. Chidsey (MBA, JD) – former CEO of Burger King
- Kenneth Cole (BA 1976) – clothing designer
- Harlan Crow – real estate developer from Dallas, Texas
- Aaron Davidson – chairman of the North American Soccer League and president of Traffic Sports USA
- Nir Eyal (BA 2001) – writer, educator, and entrepreneur in the field of consumer psychology and behavioral design
- Jason Goldberg (dropped out) – internet entrepreneur
- Michael Golden (MBA) – vice chairman of The New York Times Company
- Michael Golden (MBA) – president and CEO of Smith & Wesson
- C. Robert Henrikson (JD 1972) – chairman of the board, president, and CEO of Metlife, Inc.
- Alan J. Lacy (MBA 1977) – former chairman and CEO of Sears, Roebuck and Company
- Jim Lanzone (JD and MBA) – former CEO of Ask.com, former CEO of Clicker, current CEO of CBS Interactive
- Raymond W. McDaniel Jr. (JD) – chairman and chief executive officer of Moody's Corporation
- Richard H. Neiman (JD) – 43rd superintendent of Banks for the State of New York
- Hank J. Ratner (born 1959) – media, sports, entertainment and telecommunications executive
- Djuan Rivers (BA 1987) – vice president of Disney's Animal Kingdom at Walt Disney World
- John B. Sams (Advanced Management Program 1988) – vice president of the Air Force Systems business unit, part of Boeing Integrated Defense Systems
- Rankin M. Smith Sr. (attended one year, then transferred to the University of Georgia) – businessman and philanthropist
- A.J. Steigman (BBA 2008) – founder and CEO of Steignet
- Ben J. Tarbutton (BA 1905) – businessman and politician
- Emory Williams, Sr. (BA 1932) – retired corporate executive of Sears Roebuck and civic leader in Chicago, namesake of the Emory Williams Teaching Award at Emory University
- Robert W. Woodruff (one term as an undergraduate) – former president of the Coca-Cola Company, gave over $230 million to Emory University, namesake of its Woodruff Health Sciences Center and the Robert W. Woodruff Library

=== Arts and letters ===
==== Film and television ====
- Orny Adams (BA 1993) – actor, comedian (Teen Wolf)
- Erica Ash (BA) – actress and comedian
- Fala Chen (BBA 2005) – Chinese-American actress, two-time TVB Anniversary Award for Best Supporting Actress winner, model, and pageant winner
- James W. Flannery – emeritus professor and producer of the Emmy winning A Southern Celtic Christmas Concert on PBS
- Antonia Gentry (BA 2019) – actress, star of the Netflix Original Ginny and Georgia
- Joel Godard (BA 1960) – television announcer for Late Night with Conan O'Brien
- Ernie Harwell (BA 1940) – baseball broadcaster
- Glenda Hatchett (JD 1977) – star of the television show Judge Hatchett
- Dr. Will Kirby (BS 1995) – celebrity dermatologist, authority on laser tattoo removal, winner of Big Brother and star of Dr. 90210
- Justin Lazard (attended) – actor, producer, director, and model
- Natalia Livingston (BA 1998) – Emmy Award-winning actress on the soap opera General Hospital
- George Page (BA 1957) – television host, known for his work on the PBS series Nature
- Adam Richman (BA 1996) – actor, host of Man v. Food on the Travel Channel
- Jim Sarbh (BA 2009) – actor in the Hindi film industry
- Stephen Schneider (BA) – actor (Broad City)

==== Journalism and non-fiction writing ====
- David Brinkley – journalist and television newscaster
- Doug DeMuro – automotive journalist for Jalopnik and later editor at Autotrader Oversteer
- Adam Feuerstein – columnist and journalist in biotechnology sector
- Laura Foreman (BA 1965) – journalist and the first woman political writer at The Philadelphia Inquirer
- Michelle Ye Hee Lee – journalist, The Washington Post
- Frank Main (BA 1986) – Pulitzer Prize-winning (2011) reporter for the Chicago Sun Times
- Kai Ryssdal (BA 1985) – host of Marketplace, a business program that airs weekdays on U.S. public radio stations affiliated with American Public Media
- Mike Sager (BA 1978) – bestselling author and award-winning journalist
- Jonathan Schanzer – author and scholar in Middle Eastern studies
- Bill Sharpe – Charleston, South Carolina news anchor
- Claude Sitton (BA 1943) – Pulitzer Prize winner (1983) and former New York Times national editor
- Touré (attended) – novelist, journalist, cultural critic

==== Literature and poetry ====
- H. Jackson Brown, Jr. (BA 1963) – author best known for his book Life's Little Instruction Book
- Nicole Cooley (PhD) – poet
- Alfred Corn (BA 1965) – poet and essayist
- Elizabeth Otis Dannelly (1838–1896) – poet
- Norman Finkelstein (PhD) – poet and literary critic
- Ken Grimwood (attended 1961–1963) – novelist, author of prize-winning novel Replay, set at Emory
- Olga Grushin (BA 1993) – novelist
- Lauren Gunderson (BA 2004) – playwright
- Ernest Hartsock (BA 1925) – poet and publisher
- Carl Hiaasen (attended for two years, then transferred to the University of Florida) – author
- Edward E. Kramer (MD) – editor and author of numerous science fiction, fantasy, and horror works
- Ferrol Sams (MD 1949) – humorist and best-selling author of Run with the Horsemen
- Sarah Shankman – mystery writer
- Daniel Wallace (attended as undergraduate, and transferred to University of North Carolina, Chapel Hill) – author of Big Fish: A Novel of Mythic Proportions, later made into the Tim Burton film Big Fish

==== Music ====
- Scooter Braun (attended as undergrad alum) – music manager of Justin Bieber and Ariana Grande
- Peter Buck – lead guitarist, R.E.M. (dropped out)
- Kristian Bush (BA 1992) – singer and co-founder of the band Sugarland, which won a Grammy Award in 2008
- Mac Davis (attended) – country musician, songwriter and actor
- Tinsley Ellis (BA 1979) – blues singer
- Keri Hilson (attended) – songwriter and R&B artist
- Lil Mabu (currently attending) – rapper
- Amy Ray (BA 1986) – singer, the Indigo Girls
- Emily Saliers (BA 1985) – singer, the Indigo Girls
- Robert Schneider (PhD 2018) – lead singer, guitarist and producer, The Apples in Stereo, number theorist

==== Visual art ====
- Julien Binford – painter
- Steven Newsome – arts administrator

==== Other ====
- Christopher McCandless (BA 1990) – subject of Into the Wild by Jon Krakauer
- Trip Payne (BA 1990) – puzzle constructor and three-time American Crossword Puzzle Tournament champion
- Joshua Schwadron – featured in the March 2003 publication of GQ magazine, which honored him as its national college "Big Man on Campus"

=== Politics ===
Note: individuals who belong in multiple sections appear in the most relevant section.

==== Heads of state ====
- Lado Gurgenidze (MBA 1993) – 6th Prime Minister of the country of Georgia
- Lee Hong-koo (BA 1959) – 26th Prime Minister of South Korea

==== U.S. vice presidents ====
- Alben W. Barkley (BA 1900) – 35th vice president of the United States

==== U.S. cabinet secretaries and other prominent federal government officials ====
- Robb LaKritz (JD, 1997) – former advisor to the deputy U.S. treasury secretary, appointed by President George W. Bush
- Jody Powell (PhD) – White House press secretary under Jimmy Carter
- David Poythress (BA 1964, JD 1967) – former secretary of state and commissioner of labor of the state of Georgia

==== U.S. governors and lieutenant governors ====
- C. Farris Bryant (attended) – 34th governor of Florida
- Bill Haslam (BA 1980) – 49th governor of Tennessee; heir to the Pilot Flying J fortune; richest Emory alum, worth $2 billion
- Crissy Haslam (BBA 1980) – First Lady of Tennessee
- Spessard Holland (BA 1912) – 28th governor of Florida and US senator from Florida
- Claude R. Kirk Jr. (BS 1945) – 36th governor of Florida
- Zell Miller (attended) – 79th governor of Georgia and senator from Georgia
- Mark Fletcher Taylor (BA 1979) – former lieutenant governor of Georgia
- Melvin E. Thompson (BA 1926) – 71st governor of Georgia

==== Legislators ====
===== U.S. senators =====
- Nathan Philemon Bryan (BA 1893) – former U.S. senator from Florida
- William James Bryan (BA 1896) – former U.S. senator from Florida
- Wyche Fowler (JD 1969) – former U.S. senator from Georgia and ambassador
- Carte Goodwin (JD 1999) – politician and attorney who briefly served as junior United States senator from West Virginia
- George LeMieux (BA 1991) – U.S. senator from Florida
- Thomas M. Norwood (BA 1850) – U.S. senator and representative from Georgia
- Sam Nunn (BA 1960, LLB 1962) – former U.S. senator from Georgia
- Tom Stewart (attended) – former U.S. senator from Tennessee

===== U.S. representatives =====
- Sanford Bishop (JD 1971) – U.S. representative from Georgia and former Democratic member of the Georgia State Senate
- John Glen Browder (MA 1971, PhD 1971) – former member of the United States House of Representatives
- Kathy Castor (BA 1988) – U.S. congresswoman (D-FL)
- Max Cleland (MA) – former United States senator from Georgia
- Bill Cobey – former U.S. representative from North Carolina's 4th congressional district; director of the Jesse Helms Center
- Tillie K. Fowler (BA 1964, JD 1967) – former United States representative from Florida
- Newt Gingrich (BA 1965) – former Speaker of the United States House of Representatives
- Elliott Levitas (BA 1952, JD 1956) – former U.S. congressman
- James MacKay (LLB 1947) – former U.S. representative from Georgia
- Larry McDonald (MD 1957) – politician, member of the United States House of Representatives; victim of Korean Air Lines Flight 007, which was shot down by Soviet Union interceptors
- Leslie Jasper Steele (BA 1893) – congressional representative for Georgia and lawyer
- Fletcher Thompson (BA 1949) – lawyer and congressional representative for Georgia
- Robert Wexler (attended for undergraduate degree, then transferred to the University of Florida) – congressman from Florida

===== State legislators and city officials =====
- Garland T. Byrd (LLB 1948) – former lieutenant governor of Georgia
- James V. Carmichael (BA 1932) – member of the Georgia General Assembly 1935–1940; candidate for governor of Georgia in 1946
- Jeffrey M. Frederick (BA 1997) – former member of the Virginia House of Delegates and former chairman of the Republican Party of Virginia
- James A. Harrell, III (Law) – former Democratic member of the North Carolina General Assembly
- Chris Kolb (Law) – politician from Ann Arbor, Michigan; former member of the Michigan State House of Representatives
- Keiffer J. Mitchell, Jr. (BA 1990) – former member of the Baltimore City Council, member of the Maryland House of Delegates
- Joe Negron (JD 1986) – replacement Republican candidate for the Mark Foley Congressional seat in Florida in 2006
- Jeff Waldstreicher (BA) – politician from Maryland, member of the Maryland House of Delegates

==== Mayors ====
- Teresa Tomlinson (JD 1991) – mayor of Columbus, Georgia (2011–2019)

==== Diplomats ====
- David I. Adelman (JD 1989) – United States ambassador to Singapore
- Gordon Giffin (JD 1974) – 34th ambassador of the United States to Canada
- John Hubert Kelly (BA 1961) – United States diplomat, former U.S. ambassador to Finland
- Larry Leon Palmer (BA 1970) – United States diplomat, former U.S. ambassador to Honduras

==== Military ====
- Francis L. Garrett – chief of chaplains of the U.S. Navy
- Kevin M. McCoy (MBA 1994) – 42nd commander of Naval Sea Systems Command
- John N. McLaughlin (BA 1941) – Marine Corps lieutenant general, served in three wars and spent three years as a POW
- Edward L. Thomas – Confederate general during the American Civil War

==== Judges ====
===== U.S. Supreme Court justices =====
- Lucius Quintus Cincinnatus Lamar (II) (BA 1845) – former United States Supreme Court justice and senator from Mississippi

===== Federal and state judges =====
- Rowland Barnes (BA 1972, faculty member at Emory) – former Atlanta Superior Court judge
- Stanley F. Birch Jr. (JD 1970, LLM 1976) – federal judge on the United States Court of Appeals for the Eleventh Circuit
- Elizabeth L. Branch (JD 1994) – federal judge on the United States Court of Appeals for the Eleventh Circuit
- Ada E. Brown (JD 1999) – federal judge on the United States District Court for the Northern District of Texas
- Mark Howard Cohen (BA 1976, JD 1979) – federal judge on the United States District Court for the Northern District of Georgia
- Clarence Cooper (JD 1967) – federal judge on the United States District Court for the Northern District of Georgia
- James Larry Edmondson (BA 1968) – federal judge on the United States Court of Appeals for the Eleventh Circuit
- J. Robert Elliott (BA 1930, JD 1934) – former politician, federal judge on the United States District Court for the Middle District of Georgia
- Orinda Dale Evans (JD 1968) – federal judge on the United States District Court for the Northern District of Georgia
- Steven D. Grimberg (JD 1974) – federal judge on the United States District Court for the Northern District of Georgia
- Catharina Haynes (JD 1986) – federal judge on the United States Court of Appeals for the Fifth Circuit
- Frank M. Hull (JD 1973) – federal judge on the United States Court of Appeals for the Eleventh Circuit
- Willis Hunt (LLB 1954) – federal judge on the United States District Court for the Northern District of Georgia
- Hugh Lawson (BA 1963, JD 1964) – federal judge on the United States District Court for the Middle District of Georgia
- Julien Xavier Neals (JD 1991) – federal judge on the United States District Court for the District of New Jersey
- Leah Ward Sears (JD 1980) – former chief justice of the Supreme Court of Georgia; first African-American chief justice in the United States
- Thomas B. Wells (JD 1973) – judge of the United States Tax Court

==== Attorneys ====
- John M. Dowd (JD 1965) – trial attorney in the U.S. Department of Justice's Tax and Criminal Divisions; Emory Law School Distinguished Alumni award recipient in 2008
- E. Duncan Getchell (BA 1971) – lawyer, former nominee to the United States Court of Appeals for the Fourth Circuit
- Thomas Hardeman, Jr. (BA 1945) – politician, lawyer and soldier
- Ken Hodges (BA 1988) – former district attorney for Dougherty County, Georgia
- John James Jones (BA 1945) – politician and lawyer
- Elizabeth Prelogar (BA 2002) – lawyer, former clerk for Ruth Bader Ginsburg and Elena Kagan, and Solicitor General of the United States appointed by Joe Biden
- Randolph W. Thrower (BA 1934, JD 1936) – partner at Sutherland Asbill & Brennan LLP, namesake of the Randolph W. Thrower Symposium at Emory University School of Law
- Fani Willis (JD 1996) – first female district attorney of Fulton County, Georgia

==== Activists ====
- Allida Black (BA 1974) – historian and founder of Ready for Hillary
- Larry Klayman (JD 1977) – founder of Judicial Watch
- Wanjira Mathai (MPA 1996, MBA 1999) – vice president and regional director for Africa at the World Resources Institute, named one of the TIME 100 Most Influential People in the World (2023)
- Ralph E. Reed, Jr. (PhD) – conservative political activist
- Yun Chi-ho (BA) – politician, educator; independence activist in Korea in the early 20th century

=== Religion ===
==== Bishops ====
- Frank Kellogg Allan (BA 1956) – eighth bishop of the Episcopal Diocese of Atlanta
- Arthur James Armstrong (BA) – bishop of the United Methodist Church
- Sante Uberto Barbieri (MA) – bishop of the Methodist Church in Latin America
- Robert McGrady Blackburn (BD 1943) – bishop of the United Methodist Church
- John Warren Branscomb – bishop of the Methodist Church
- Warren Akin Candler (BA 1877) – bishop of the Methodist Episcopal Church, tenth president of Emory University
- James Edward Dickey (BA 1891) – bishop of the Methodist Episcopal Church, South
- James L. Duncan (BA 1935)) – bishop of the Episcopal Church
- Benjamin Fischer (BA, MA 2001) – bishop of the Anglican Church in North America
- Larry M. Goodpaster (M.Div. 1973, D.Min. 1982) – bishop of the United Methodist Church
- Paul Hardin, Jr. (M.Div. 1927) – bishop in the Methodist Church
- Nolan Bailey Harmon – bishop of the Methodist Church and the United Methodist Church
- Janice Riggle Huie (D.Div 1989) – bishop of the United Methodist Church
- Earl Gladstone Hunt, Jr. (BD, M.Div. 1946) – president of Emory and Henry College, author and theologian, bishop of the Methodist Church and the United Methodist Church
- Lewis Bevel Jones III (BA 1946, M.Div. 1949) – bishop of the United Methodist Church
- Clay Foster Lee, Jr. (Bachelor of Divinity 1953) – bishop of the United Methodist Church
- Richard Carl Looney – bishop of the United Methodist Church
- Arthur James Moore (attended as undergraduate 1909–1911) – bishop of the Methodist Episcopal Church, South (MECS), the Methodist Church, and the United Methodist Church
- Carl Julian Sanders (BD 1936) – bishop of the United Methodist Church
- Roy Hunter Short – bishop of the Methodist Church and the United Methodist Church
- William Turner Watkins (Ph.B. 1926) – bishop of the Methodist Episcopal Church, South (MECS) and the Methodist Church
- Timothy W. Whitaker (M.Div. 1973) – bishop of the United Methodist Church
- Richard J. Wills, Jr. (M.Div. 1967) – bishop of the United Methodist Church
- John K. Yambasu (M.Theo.) – bishop of the United Methodist Church for Sierra Leone

==== Ministers and theologians ====
- Young John Allen (BA 1858) – American Methodist missionary in late Qing Dynasty China
- Lewis C. Branscomb – Methodist minister
- John B. Cobb – process theologian
- William P. Harrison – minister and theologian, Chaplain of the United States House of Representatives
- Bernice King (M.Div. and J.D.1990) – daughter of civil rights leader Martin Luther King Jr. and Coretta Scott King
- Eugene Marion Klaaren (MA) – historian and professor of religion
- Steven Jack Land (M.Div. 1973, PhD 1991) – renewal theologian within the Pentecostal movement
- Doug Moseley (M.Div. 1957) – retired United Methodist minister and author who served as a Republican member of the Kentucky State Senate
- Kiyoshi Tanimoto (1940) – Japanese-born Methodist preacher, survivor of Hiroshima bombing
- Donald Wildmon (M.Div. 1965) – ordained United Methodist minister, author, former radio host, and founder and chairman emeritus of the American Family Association and American Family Radio
- Stephen Crotts (M.Div. 1975) - ordained Presbyterian Minister and Author

=== Science ===
==== Medicine ====
- Heidi Blanck (PhD) – epidemiologist and chief at the Centers for Disease Control and Prevention
- Mark Elliott Brecher (BA) – retired chief medical officer, LabCorp; emeritus professor, University of North Carolina
- Lisa Cooper (BA) – public health physician, professor at Johns Hopkins University, recipient of the MacArthur Fellows Program fellowship
- Robert DuPont (BA 1958) – national leader in drug abuse prevention, policy and treatment
- H. Winter Griffith (MD 1953) – physician who authored 27 popular medical books
- Timothy Harlan (BA 1987, MD 1991) – physician, chef and author
- John R. Heller Jr. – director of National Cancer Institute 1948–1960
- Hamilton E. Holmes (MD 1967) – orthopedic physician
- Chonnettia Jones – geneticist and developmental biologist; director of insight and analysis at Wellcome Trust
- William N. Kelley (BA, MD) – CEO of University of Pennsylvania Health System, dean of University of Pennsylvania School of Medicine, co-discoverer of Kelley-Seegmiller Syndrome
- Alisha Kramer (MD 2018) – physician and health activist
- Michael J. Kuhar – Candler Professor of Neuropharmacology at the Yerkes National Primate Research Center, Emory
- David Malebranche (MD 1996) – Haitian-American physician working in the field of HIV/AIDS; assistant professor of medicine at Emory University
- Arnold J. Mandell – neuroscientist and psychiatrist, founding chairman of the Department of Psychiatry at the University of California, San Diego
- J. Morgan Micheletti (MD) – ophthalmologist, researcher, inventor, and recipient of the Outstanding Young Texas Ex Award
- J. Michael Millis (BA 1981) – academic and surgeon
- Arnall Patz (BA 1943, MD 1945) – ophthalmology researcher and Presidential Medal of Freedom recipient who discovered that oxygen therapy causes blindness in infants
- Thomas M. Rivers (BA 1909?) – virologist, headed the National Science Foundation's search for a polio vaccine
- Charles H. Roadman II (MD 1973) – 16th United States Air Force Surgeon General
- William C. Roberts (MD 1958) – cardiologist and pathologist, first head of pathology for the National Heart, Lung and Blood Institute; executive director of the Baylor Cardiovascular Institute of Baylor University Medical Center
- Jane Anne Russell – endocrinologist, biochemistry professor
- Aalisha Sahukhan (MPH) – communicable disease expert, and head of Health Protection at the Ministry of Health and Medical Services in Fiji
- David Sherer – physician, author and inventor
- Eugene A. Stead (BS 1928, MD 1932) – medical educator, researcher, and the founder of the physician assistant profession
- Edwin Trevathan (MD 1982, MPH 1982) – pediatrician and pediatric neurologist; dean of the School of Public Health at St. Louis University, former director of the Centers for Disease Control's National Center on Birth Defects and Developmental Disabilities
- W. Dean Warren – former chairman of the Department of Surgery and president of the American College of Surgeons

==== Technology ====
- David A. Bray (BS, MS, PhD) – distinguished fellow and Loomis Council co-chair for the Stimson Center, member of the National Academy of Public Administration, and a senior executive who received the National Intelligence Exceptional Achievement Medal
- Sonny Carter (BS 1969, MD 1973) – astronaut, physician, and professional soccer player with the Atlanta Chiefs
- Robert Simpson (MA 1935) – meteorologist and co-developer of the Saffir-Simpson Hurricane Scale

=== Sports ===
- Warrick Dunn (MBA 2013) – Pro Bowl NFL running back for the Atlanta Falcons and Tampa Bay Buccaneers
- Bobby Jones (attended law school 1926–1927) – professional golfer, founder of the Masters Tournament, namesake of The Robert T. Jones Jr. Scholarship Program at Emory University
- Alec Kessler (MD 1999) – basketball player for the University of Georgia and the Miami Heat, orthopedic surgeon
- Diana Nyad (did not graduate) – world record long-distance swimmer and ranked squash player
- Parson Perryman – professional baseball player
- A.J. Steigman (Business School) – chess player
- Bob Varsha (Law 1977) – automotive racing broadcaster
- Wendy Weinberg – Olympic medalist swimmer
- Andrew Wilson (2017) – 2020 Olympic gold medalist swimmer

=== Honorary degrees ===
- Tom Brokaw (2005H) – author of The Greatest Generation (1998), Peabody Award (1989) and Presidential Medal of Freedom (2014)
- Kim Dae-Jung (1983H) – 8th president of the Republic of Korea
- Vicente Fox Quesada (2009H) – 55th president of Mexico
- Arnold Schwarzenegger (2010H) – Austrian American actor and philanthropist; 38th governor of California 2003–2011

== Faculty ==
=== African American studies ===
- Carol Anderson – author of White Rage: The Unspoken Truth of Our Racial Divide
- Nathan McCall – journalist and New York Times bestselling author

=== Business ===
- Lawrence Benveniste – Asa Griggs Candler Professor of Finance at the Goizueta Business School
- Benn Konsynski – George S. Craft Distinguished University Professor of Decision & Information Analysis at the Goizueta Business School
- Paul Rubin – Samuel Candler Dobbs Professor of Economics and Law
- Jagdish Sheth – Charles H. Kellstadt Professor of Marketing at the Goizueta Business School

=== History ===
- Michael Bellesiles – controversial author of Arming America
- Dan T. Carter – historian of the modern South
- Elizabeth Fox-Genovese – feminist historian and a primary voice of the conservative women's movement
- Eugene Genovese – historian of the American South and American slavery
- Barbara Krauthamer – historian of African Americans
- Jeffrey Lesser – historian of Latin America, Samuel Candler Dobbs Professor and chair of the History Department
- Gyanendra Pandey – a founding member of the Subaltern Studies project
- Mark Ravina – scholar of early modern (Tokugawa) Japanese history
- Kenneth Stein – William E. Schatten Professor of Contemporary Middle Eastern History and Israeli Studies

=== Journalism ===
- Hank Klibanoff – former managing editor of the Atlanta Journal-Constitution, current journalism professor

=== Law ===
- Harold J. Berman (law professor 1985–retirement) – founder of the American Law Center in Moscow, co-founder of the World Law Institute
- Michael Broyde (born 1964) – law professor
- Kathleen Neal Cleaver – activist and senior lecturer
- Bruce Frohnen – associate professor of Law at Ohio Northern University, Pettit College of Law

=== Literature ===
- Geoffrey Bennington – literary critic and philosopher, expert on deconstruction
- Jericho Brown – Charles Howard Candler Professor of English and Creative Writing and Interim Director of Creative Writing
- Michael A. Elliott – Charles Howard Candler Professor of English, 20th president of Amherst College
- Richard Ellmann – Robert Woodruff Professor and preeminent James Joyce scholar
- Mikhail Epstein – S.C. Dobbs Professor of cultural theory and Russian literature
- Shoshana Felman – literary critic, commentator on psychoanalysis, and founder of trauma theory
- Ha Jin – Chinese-American writer, former professor of English at Emory; winner of the National Book Award, PEN/Faulkner Award, Flannery O'Connor Award for Short Fiction, Pulitzer Prize finalist
- James H. Morey – professor of English, expert in Middle English
- Salman Rushdie – author and literary scholar
- Avi Sharon – professor of classics, translator, consultant
- Stephen Spender – artist in residence, mid-1980s
- Natasha Trethewey – Pulitzer Prize-winning poet, United States Poet Laureate 2012 and Robert W. Woodruff professor of English and Creative Writing

=== Philosophy ===
- Thomas R. Flynn – Samuel Candler Dobbs Professor of Philosophy
- Jean-François Lyotard – late Robert Woodruff Professor and prominent French philosopher
- Andrew J. Mitchell – professor of philosophy

=== Political science ===
- Alan Abramowitz – Alben W. Barkley Professor of Political Science
- Gregory Berns – neuroeconomist and writer
- Courtney Brown – associate professor of political science and remote viewing practitioner
- Jimmy Carter – former president of the United States and University Distinguished Professor since 1982
- Tom S. Clark – Charles Howard Candler Professor of Political Science
- Marion V. Creekmore Jr. – former Deputy Assistant Secretary of State for International Organizations Affairs, U.S. Ambassador to Sri Lanka and Republic of Maldives
- Tenzin Gyatso – fourteenth and current Dalai Lama; named presidential professor of Emory University
- Harvey Klehr – Andrew W. Mellon Professor of Politics and History
- Tom Price (former professor) – member of United States House of Representatives
- Dan Reiter – professor of political science

=== Medicine ===
- Renato D. Alarcón – head of the Department of Psychiatry
- Robert Wayne Alexander – chair of the medical school, 1999
- Daniel Brat – neuropathologist and academic, Emory professor 1999–2017, current Magerstadt Professor of Pathology, Feinberg School of Medicine
- Doug Bremner – professor of Psychiatry and Radiology, School of Medicine, author
- Thomas E. Dobbs - former State Health Officer of Mississippi; namesake of Dobbs v. Jackson Women's Health Organization landmark decision of the U.S. Supreme Court which overturned Roe v. Wade
- Sanjay Gupta – assistant professor of Neurosurgery at Emory; CNN medical correspondent
- Thomas R. Insel – neuroscientist; director of the Yerkes Regional Primate Research Center at Emory 1994–1999; left to become director of the National Institute of Mental Health
- Mildred M. Jordan – president of the Medical Library Association
- Melvin Konner – Samuel Candler Dobbs Professor of Anthropology and associate professor of Psychiatry and Neurology
- Han Qide (韩启德) – vice chairman of the National People's Congress of China; previously with Emory School of medicine 1985–1987 and Woodruff Medal Winner in 2006
- Barbara Rothbaum – psychologist and head of the Trauma and Anxiety Recovery Program at Emory
- Neil B. Shulman – associate professor in the School of Medicine, author, children's book writer, website and movie developer
- Eric Sorscher – professor, Center for Cystic Fibrosis and Airways Disease Research

=== Music ===
- Eric Nelson – director of Choral Studies; conductor of Emory's 40-voice Concert Choir and its 180-voice University Chorus; 2004 recipient of "Crystal Apple" award for excellence in teaching at Emory

=== Science and technology ===
- Fereydoon Family – Samuel Candler Dobbs Professor of Physics, fellow of the American Physical Society
- Dennis C. Liotta – professor of Chemistry and co-inventor of the AIDS drug emtricitabine
- Ilya Nemenman – Winship Distinguished Research Professor of theoretical physics and biology, fellow of the American Physical Society
- Marion Sewer – pharmacologist known for her work on lipid metabolism and efforts to support underrepresented minorities in science, served as deputy chair of American Society for Biochemistry and Molecular Biology's Minority Affairs Committee

=== Sociology ===
- Robert Agnew – Samuel Candler Dobbs Professor of Sociology; developer of General Strain Theory
- Sam Cherribi – Moroccan-Dutch politician and senior lecturer in sociology at Emory
- Frans de Waal – Charles Howard Candler Professor of Primate Behavior, foreign associate of the United States National Academy of Sciences
- Alyasah Ali Sewell – associate professor, Winship Distinguished Research Professor

=== Religion ===
- Thomas J. J. Altizer (professor 1956–1968) – liberal theologian who postulated in the early 1960s the "death of God"
- Merle Black – Asa Griggs Candler Professor of Politics and Government
- James W. Fowler – Charles Howard Candler Professor of Theology and Human Development
- Deborah Lipstadt – professor of Modern Jewish and Holocaust Studies; author of Denying the Holocaust: The Growing Assault on Truth and Memory (1994)
- Don Saliers – William R. Cannon Distinguished Professor of Theology and Worship
- Andrew Sledd – first president of the University of Florida (1905–1909), president of Southern University (1910–1914), first professor of New Testament literature at Candler School of Theology (1914–1939)
- Devin J. Stewart – professor of Islamic studies and Middle Eastern studies
- Danielle Tumminio Hansen – professor of practical theology and spiritual care

== Presidents of Emory ==
1. Ignatius Alphonso Few, 1836–1839
2. Augustus Baldwin Longstreet, 1840–1848
3. George Foster Pierce, 1848–1854
4. Alexander Means, 1854–1855
5. James R. Thomas, 1855–1867
6. Luther M. Smith (1848C), 1867–1871
7. Osborn Lewis Smith (1842C), 1871–1875
8. Atticus Green Haygood (1859C), 1875–1884
9. Isaac Stiles Hopkins (1859C), 1884–1888
10. Warren Akin Candler (1875C), 1888–1898
11. Charles E. Dowman (1873C), 1898–1902
12. James Edward Dickey (1891C), 1902–1915
13. Harvey Warren Cox, 1920–1942
14. Goodrich C. White (1908C), 1942–1957
15. S. Walter Martin, 1957–1962
16. Sanford S. Atwood, 1963–1977
17. James T. Laney, 1977–1993
18. Billy E. Frye (1954G, 1956 Ph.D.), 1993–1994
19. William Chace, 1994–2003
20. James W. Wagner, 2003–2016
21. Claire E. Sterk, 2016–2020
22. Gregory L. Fenves, 2020–present
