= Earl Hunt =

Earl Hunt may refer to:

- Earl B. Hunt (1933–2016), American psychologist and computer scientist
- Earl Gladstone Hunt Jr. (1918–2005), American Methodist pastor and evangelist
