= Lado Gurgenidze =

Georgian politician; former Prime Minister of Georgia

Vladimer Gurgenidze
- ვლადიმერ გურგენიძე
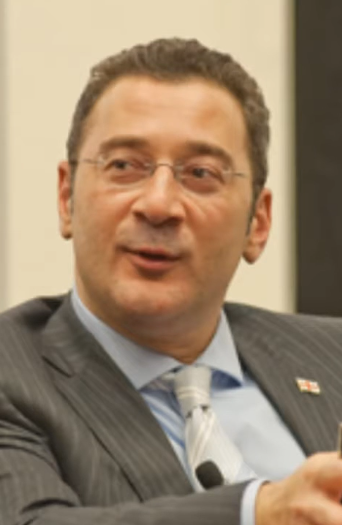
- Gurgenidze in 2015

Prime Minister of Georgia
- In office 22 November 2007 – 1 November 2008
- President: Mikheil Saakashvili; Nino Burjanadze (Acting); Mikheil Saakashvili
- Preceded by: Giorgi Baramidze (acting)
- Succeeded by: Grigol Mgaloblishvili

Chairman of the Supervisory Board of Bank of Georgia
- In office 15 September 2004 – 22 November 2007
- Succeeded by: Nicholas Enukidze

Personal details
- Born: 7 December 1970 (age 55) Tbilisi, Georgian SSR, Soviet Union
- Party: Independent
- Education: Tbilisi State University; Middlebury College; Emory University-Goizueta Business School
- Occupation: Investor, banker, free market advocate
- Profession: Business executive
- Website: Bank Website

Vladimer "Lado" Gurgenidze (Georgian: ვლადიმერ [ლადო] გურგენიძე; born 7 December 1970) is a Georgian career banker, business executive, and former politician, who was the prime minister of Georgia from 22 November 2007 to 1 November 2008.

== Early life ==
Gurgenidze was born on 7 December 1970 in Tbilisi, Georgia. He received an MBA degree from Goizueta Business School of Emory University (Georgia, USA) in 1993, following undergraduate studies at Middlebury College (Vermont, USA) and Tbilisi State University.

== Early banking career ==
Gurgenidze is a career banker. After a decade spent at several investment banks in Eastern Europe and London. Gurgenidze returned to his native Georgia following the Rose Revolution and spearheaded, as Executive Chairman and CEO, the turnaround of Bank of Georgia. During Lado's three-year tenure Bank of Georgia's Total Assets and Net Income increased by 854% and 1,779%, respectively. As its market share grew from 18% to 34%, Bank of Georgia became the leading universal bank in Georgia and in the region, with market capitalisation exceeding US$900 million at the time of Lado's departure (up from US$30 million at the time of his arrival). Under Lado's leadership Bank of Georgia became the first Georgian entity and the second bank from former Soviet Union to list its shares on the London Stock Exchange (November 2006), also the first-ever Georgian entity to issue international Eurobonds (February 2007) and obtain credit rating from all three major rating agencies (Standard & Poor's, Moody's and Fitch Ratings). During Lado's tenure, more than 100 institutional investors became shareholders of Bank of Georgia's and the bank's free float reached 94%. In 2000 Gurgenidze established the first Georgian full-service investment bank, Galt & Taggart Securities, where he served as the Chairman of the Supervisory Board (2004–2007). Gurgenidze also served as the member of the Supervisory Board of the Georgian Stock Exchange from 2004 until 2007. Under Lado's management Bank of Georgia became the first Georgian bank to receive Euromoney Award for excellence; Bank of Georgia was also named as the Best Bank in Georgia by the Banker in 2006 and 2007.

In 2006 Gurgenidze hosted the licensed Georgian version of The Apprentice TV show.

Before returning to Georgia, Gurgenidze was the Managing Director, Head of Europe at Putnam Lovell (now part of Jefferies) in 2003–2004. Prior to Putnam Lovell, Gurgenidze served as Head of Technology Corporate Finance, Head of M&A and held other positions at ABN Amro advising such clients as Swift, Reuters, Moneyline Telerate, Wirtualna Polska, Marconi, Andrew Corporation, Merloni Elettrodomestici, News Corp, Global One, Golden Telecom and UPC.

== Political career ==
In November 2007 Gurgenidze was appointed as the Prime Minister of Georgia and served a one-year term until October 2008. During his short tenure as the Prime Minister, Gurgenidze has initiated significant changes to the fiscal and monetary laws of Georgia which paved the way for Georgia to become a regional trade and financial hub. Gurgenidze has also instigated changes to the Georgian financial services sector and improved the law of Georgia on industrial zones. After the armed conflict between Russia and Georgia, in August 2008, Gurgenidze has played a vital role in stabilising the Georgian economy and financial services sector. He obtained (in September 2008) US$750 million stand-by loan facility from International Monetary Fund and brought into country US$4.5 billion donor aid. As a result of his efforts, the Georgian economy stabilised after the Russian invasion of Georgia in August 2008 which coincided with the world financial crisis.

In October 2008 Gurgenidze was awarded the Victory Order of St. George.

== Current engagements ==
Since he stepped down as Prime Minister of Georgia, Gurgenidze has been a frequent speaker on issues of economic liberty and free-market reforms at various forums and conferences and advised several developing countries in Africa on free-market reforms. From April 2009, Gurgenidze co-chairs the Emory Center for Alternative Investments. In September 2009, based on the decision of President and the government of Rwanda, Gurgenidze was appointed as the Chairman of the Supervisory Board of the largest bank in Rwanda, Bank of Kigali.

In September 2009, Gurgenidze established, together with Dinu Patriciu, Liberty Investments, an investment company focusing on financial services institutions in frontier markets with low corruption, low taxes and open economies. In the same month, Liberty Investments announced the acquisition of 91.2% equity interest in Liberty Bank, which has the largest branch network and client base in Georgia, serving some 1.2 million clients. Under Lado’s leadership, the first phase of the turnaround of Liberty Bank has been completed and the bank has returned to profitability in Q1 2010, growing much faster than the Georgian banking sector.

On 26 May 2010, Gurgenidze was awarded the Presidential Order of Excellence for leading the country’s government during an armed conflict with Russia and introducing innovations to the Georgian business.

In 2017, Gurgenidze joined the 4finance, one of Europe's largest online and mobile consumer lending groups, as the chairman of the supervisory board.
