= Lawrence Benveniste =

American mathematician

Lawrence M. Benveniste
- Born: United States
- Occupations: Mathematician, financial strategist and an academic

Academic background
- Education: B.S. Mathematics; PhD Mathematics
- Alma mater: University of California, Irvine; University of California, Berkeley
- Thesis: Essays in Capital Theory (1975)

Lawrence M. Benveniste is an American mathematician, financial strategist, and academic. He is the Asa Griggs Candler Professor of Finance at the Goizueta Business School at Emory University.

Benveniste is most known for his work on dynamic economic models and initial public offerings. His research has been published in academic journals, including the Journal of Finance, Journal of Financial Economics, Journal of Political Economy and Econometrica.

== Education ==
Benveniste earned his B.S. in Mathematics from the University of California, Irvine in 1972, followed by his PhD in Mathematics from the University of California, Berkeley in 1975.

== Career ==
Benveniste joined University of Rochester in 1976, initially as an assistant professor of economics until 1982. He then transitioned to the University of Pennsylvania, where he served as a lecturer in economics from 1982 to 1985. From 1985 to 1987, he held the position of staff economist at the Board of Governors of the Federal Reserve System. Following this, he assumed a role as a visiting associate professor of finance at the J. L. Kellogg Graduate School of Management at Northwestern University from 1987 to 1989. From 1989 to 1996, he held an appointment as an associate professor of finance at Boston College. His tenure at the Carlson School of Management at the University of Minnesota began in 1996, where he served as the U.S. Bancorp Professor of Finance until 2005. During his time at Carlson, he served as dean of the Carlson School of Management (2001–2005). In 2005, he assumed the position of dean of the Goizueta Business School at Emory University (2005–2013). Since 2013, he has held the position of Asa Griggs Candler Professor of Finance at the Goizueta Business School at Emory University.

== Research ==
Benveniste began his research career studying formal economic models of growth and development. His 1979 paper, "On the Differentiability of the Value Function in Dynamic Economic Models," (co-authored its José Scheinkman) provided the foundation for dynamic programming in Economics. The paper used the envelope theorem to prove that the value function is differentiable when the objective is concave and differentiable. The resulting formula is known as the Benveniste Scheinkman formula. He then transitioned to finance following his time at the Federal Reserve. His 1989 paper, "How Investment Bankers Determine the Offer Price and Allocation of New Issues," co-authored with Paul Spindt, developed the economic foundations of bookbuilding. The model explained underpricing as the natural result of inducing early investors to share their information and sentiment during the pre-selling period. The resultant prediction that offer prices only partially adjust to demand was later established in a paper by Kathleen Hanley. In his investigation of the impact of uniform-price restrictions and allocation regulations on IPO proceeds, his 1990 study proposed that underwriters may optimize proceeds through a combination of price and allocation discrimination while considering factors such as the cost of soliciting information and adverse selection.

== Selected articles ==
- Benveniste, L. M., & Scheinkman, J. A. (1979). On the differentiability of the value function in dynamic models of economics. Econometrica: Journal of the Econometric Society, 727–732.
- Benveniste, L. M., & Spindt, P. A. (1989). How investment bankers determine the offer price and allocation of new issues. Journal of financial Economics, 24(2), 343–361.
- Benveniste, L. M., & Wilhelm, W. J. (1990). A comparative analysis of IPO proceeds under alternative regulatory environments. Journal of financial economics, 28(1–2), 173–207.
- Benveniste, L. M., Busaba, W. Y., & Wilhelm Jr, W. J. (2002). Information externalities and the role of underwriters in primary equity markets. Journal of Financial Intermediation, 11(1), 61–86.
- Benveniste, L. M., Ljungqvist, A., Wilhelm Jr, W. J., & Yu, X. (2003). Evidence of information spillovers in the production of investment banking services. The Journal of Finance, 58(2), 577–608.
