= Barbara Rothbaum =

American academic

- Scientific career
- Fields: Psychology
- Institutions: Emory University

Barbara Rothbaum is a psychologist at Emory University School of Medicine in Atlanta, Georgia, United States. She is a professor in the Psychiatry department and a pioneer in the treatment of anxiety-related disorders. Rothbaum is head of the Trauma and Anxiety Recovery Program (TARP) at Emory as well as the Emory Healthcare Veterans Program. In the mid-1990s she founded a virtual exposure therapy company called Virtually Better, Inc. This company treats patients with anxiety disorders, addictions, pain, and the like using virtual reality instead of the actual place or scenario. It also allows the therapist to control the environment. She also played a key role in the development of the treatment of posttraumatic stress disorder (PTSD).

Rothbaum was president of the International Society for Traumatic Stress Studies. Her term spanned 2004 to 2005.

== Bibliography ==
- Rothbaum, B. and Foa, E.B. (1997) Treating the Trauma of Rape: Cognitive-Behavioral Therapy for PTSD (The Guilford Press)
- Rothbaum, B. and Foa, E.B. (1999) Reclaiming Your Life After Rape: Cognitive-Behavioral Therapy For Posttraumatic Stress Disorder (Oxford University Press)
- Rothbaum, B. (editor) (2005) Pathological Anxiety : Emotional Processing in Etiology and Treatment (The Guilford Press)
- Pine, Daniel, Rothbaum, B.O, and Ressler, K. (editors) (2015) "Primer on anxiety disorders." (Oxford University Press)
- Rothbaum, B. (2020, September 1). Learning Prolonged Exposure for PTSD: A Comprehensive Guide for Clinicians [Online course]. Psychotherapy Academy. https://psychotherapyacademy.org/courses/prolonged-exposure-therapy-for-ptsd/

== See also ==
- Cycloserine
- Prolonged exposure therapy, exposure therapy for posttraumatic stress disorder
- List of persons associated with Emory University
- List of psychologists
- List of University of North Carolina at Chapel Hill alumni

== Sources ==
- "Barbara O Rothbaum, Ph.D.: Curriculum Vitae". Emory University School of Medicine. Archived from the original on 2011-10-01.
- "New Virtual Reality Technique Helps Conquer Fear of Flying, Say Researchers". American Psychological Association (Press release). 2000. Archived from the original on 2000-08-15.
