= Emory Marketing Institute =

US innovative research group

- Type: Non-Profit
- Industry: Research
- Founded: 2004
- Headquarters: Atlanta, Georgia, USA
- Key people: Rajendra Srivastava, Executive Director
- Products: Research; Social research Marketing research
- Website: www.emorymi.com

The Emory Marketing Institute, formerly known as the Emory Brand Institute, is a non-profit innovation research group based in Atlanta, Georgia, United States. Founded in 2004, Emory Marketing Institute is an autonomous organization housed at the Goizueta Business School at Emory University. The institute pursues the scientific advancement of brand management.

Emory Marketing Institute conducts research, organizes events, publishes reports, recommends solutions, and works with decision makers to develop its research agenda. Its Brand Academy provides managerial development through its seminar series, which is taught by professors affiliated with the institute. The Brand Competency Development Program provides firms with advice on building new competencies through scholarly review of business activities and plans. Its Collaborative Research Solutions Program is geared to working closely with managers to focus the future research programs. It runs five research clusters including those focused on the sectors of business-to-business, services, retail, consumer goods, and financial markets. The research programs are designed to develop new methods, conceptual models, and analytic techniques for managing brands.

Emory Marketing Institute has engaged research with multiple firms including Kimberly Clark, The Coca-Cola Company, Intercontinental Hotel Group, Electronic Arts, Sony, Airtran, Atlanta Braves, Deloitte, HEB, IDEO, Newell Rubbermaid, Russell Athletic, Samsung, Tuner Broadcasting, UPS, Siemens, Haverty's, MillerZell, Aflac, Morgan Stanley, Wachovia, Goldman Sachs, Lehman Brothers, The Home Depot, Limited Brands, Leading Hotels of the World, and Marriott. It also works with market research firms, such as those including IPSOS, Harris Interactive, CFI Group, TNS, Vivaldi Partners, Millward Brown, Interbrand, Quaero, GfK, NPD Group, and IRI.
