= Gregory L. Fenves =

American engineer and college administrator (born 1957)

Greg Fenves
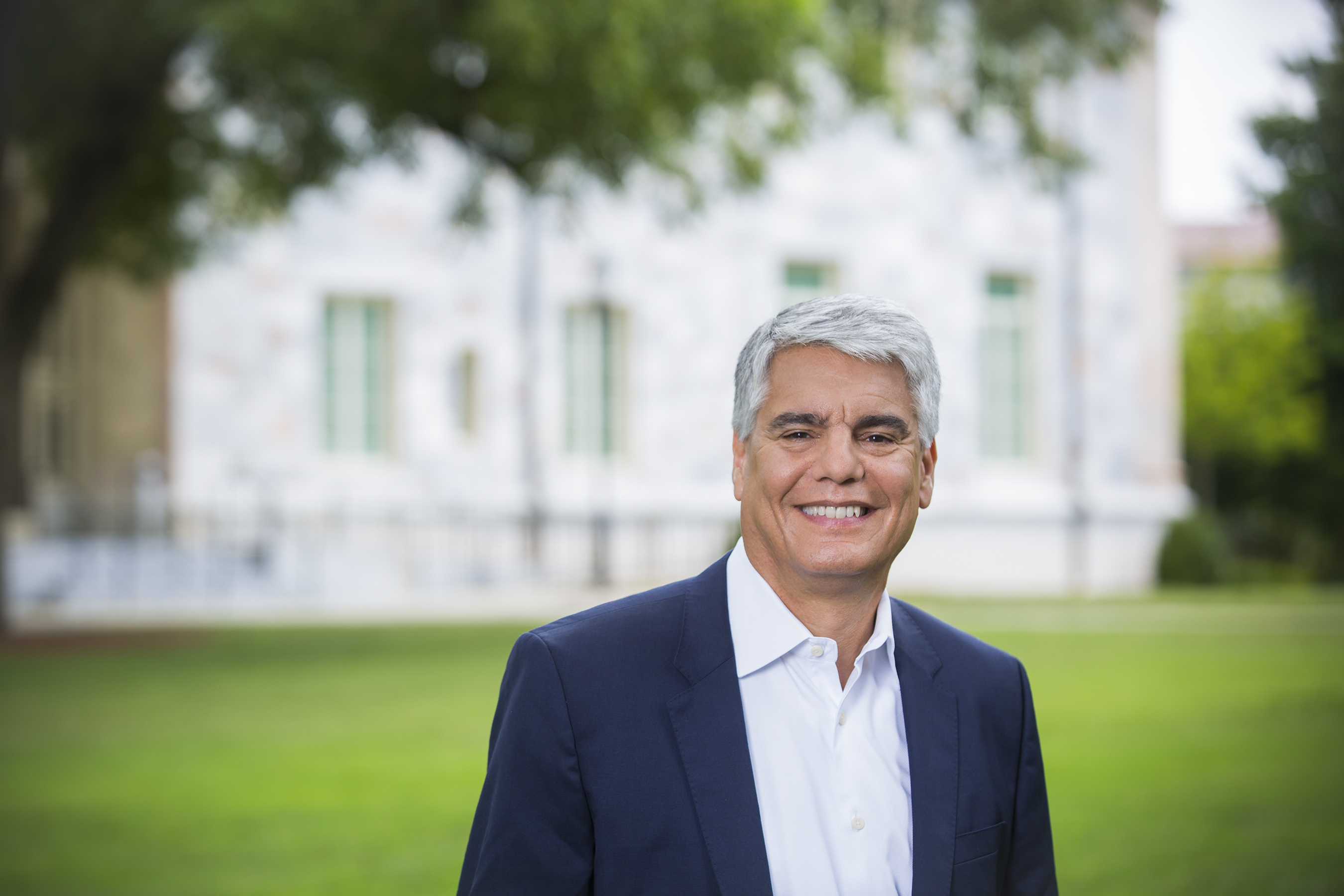

21st President of Emory University
- In office August 1, 2020 – September 1, 2025
- Preceded by: Claire E. Sterk
- Succeeded by: Leah Ward Sears

29th President of the University of Texas at Austin
- In office June 3, 2015 – June 30, 2020
- Preceded by: William Powers Jr.
- Succeeded by: Jay Hartzell

Personal details
- Born: March 1, 1957 (age 69) Champaign, Illinois, U.S.
- Education: Cornell University (BS); University of California, Berkeley (MS, PhD)

Gregory Louis Fenves (born March 1, 1957) is an American structural engineer who served as the 21st president of Emory University. He began as president on August 2020 and transitioned to the role of chancellor in September 2025.

Previously at the University of Texas at Austin, Fenves served as the 29th president from 2015 to 2020, as the provost from 2013 to 2015, and as the dean of engineering from 2008 to 2013.

Fenves's fields of studies are computational modeling and earthquake engineering. He was elected to the National Academy of Engineering in 2014.

== Early life and education ==
Fenves grew up in central Illinois and Pittsburgh, Pennsylvania. He attended and graduated from Mt. Lebanon High School in Mt. Lebanon, Pennsylvania, a suburb of Pittsburgh.

He received a Bachelor of Science with distinction from the School of Civil and Environmental Engineering at Cornell University in 1979. While at Cornell, Fenves was a member of Delta Kappa Epsilon Fraternity and the Quill and Dagger society. He pursued graduate studies at the University of California, Berkeley, where he received a Master of Science in 1980 and a Doctor of Philosophy in civil engineering in 1984.

== Career ==
Fenves began his career as an assistant professor at the Department of Civil, Architectural and Environmental Engineering at UT Austin from 1984 to 1987. He then joined the faculty at UC Berkeley, where he spent more than 20 years and served as chair of the Department of Civil and Environmental Engineering from 2002 to 2007. While at UC Berkeley, Fenves co-developed the Open System for Earthquake Engineering Simulation (OpenSees), an open-source software framework designed for simulating the seismic response of structural and geotechnical systems.

=== University of Texas at Austin ===
In 2008, Fenves returned to UT Austin as the dean of the university's Cockrell School of Engineering, a position he held for five years. From 2013 to 2015, he served as executive vice president and provost of UT Austin before being appointed the university's 29th president in 2015. He was elected to the National Academy of Engineering in 2014.

In 2016, during Fenves' tenure, the Supreme Court of the United States ruled in Fisher v. University of Texas at Austin to uphold UT Austin's admissions policies, affirming the university's ability to consider race as one factor in its holistic admissions process.

Fenves was involved in the establishment of UT Austin's Dell Medical School, the first medical school in nearly 50 years to be built from the ground up at a research university. The school opened in 2016 and graduated its first class of physicians in 2020.

In 2017, Fenves received the Guardian of the Human Spirit award from Holocaust Museum Houston, followed by the Hope for Humanity award from the Dallas Holocaust Museum/Center for Education & Tolerance in 2018. During the acceptance speeches for both awards, Fenves discussed his family's history of loss and survival during the holocaust.

In 2018, UT Austin recorded its highest four-year graduation rate, reaching 69.8%, an increase of more than 17 percentage points since 2012.

That same year, Fenves introduced the Texas Advance Commitment, a program aimed at increasing affordability by providing assured financial aid for low- and middle-income students. In 2019, the UT System Board of Regents allocated additional funding from the Permanent University Fund, ensuring full tuition coverage for in-state students with financial need from families earning up to $65,000 per year, along with partial support for those from families earning up to $125,000 per year. In 2020, the Michael and Susan Dell Foundation donated $100 million to expand resources and support for Pell Grant-eligible students at UT Austin.

In response to student protests in 2019 regarding the university's handling of sexual misconduct allegations, UT Austin formed a working group and commissioned an external review by the law firm Husch Blackwell. The firm provided recommendations to improve policies and procedures, which Fenves accepted in March 2020. A second phase of the review resulted in additional recommendations in July 2020, leading to additional reforms.

Fenves supported the development of a public-private partnership that led to the construction of the Moody Center, a new basketball and events venue at UT Austin. The project received a $130 million donation from the Moody Foundation and opened in late 2022.

On April 7, 2020, it was announced that Fenves would be leaving the University of Texas at Austin to become the president of Emory University, succeeding outgoing president Claire E. Sterk.

=== Emory University ===
Fenves assumed the role of president at Emory University on August 1, 2020.

During the COVID-19 pandemic, Fenves oversaw Emory University's response, implementing safety measures and adapting academic programs to maintain continuity in education and research.

In January 2022, Fenves announced that Emory would no longer include need-based loans in financial aid packages for undergraduate students. Moving forward, these loans would be replaced with grants and scholarships as part of the Emory Advantage program.

During Fenves' tenure in May 2023, Emory opened a 17-story facility for the Winship Cancer Institute on the campus of Emory University Hospital Midtown, Atlanta.

Fenves is part of Emory's 2036 fundraising campaign, which aims to raise $4 billion in new funding for initiatives across the university. His stated priorities include improving support for students and increasing endowed professorships.

On April 25, 2024, a protest encampment at Emory University, organized in support of the Stop Cop City movement and Palestinian solidarity, was dispersed by Emory police, the Atlanta Police Department, and Georgia State Patrol. Georgia law enforcement reportedly used chemical irritants and tasers, and 28 individuals, including students, faculty, staff, and community members, were arrested.

Following the incident, Fenves stated that the protesters included outside agitators, and some reports disputed this characterization. On April 26, faculty at Oxford College of Emory University passed a resolution calling for a vote of no confidence in Fenves and other senior administrators. The Emory College faculty senate also moved forward with a vote of no confidence. On May 3, the Emory College of Arts and Sciences faculty held a vote of no confidence in Fenves which passed 358 to 119.

In May 2025, Emory University announced that Fenves would conclude his tenure as president on September 1, 2025, and would remain with Emory to serve as the university's 6th chancellor, a ceremonial post currently held by the former Emory president James W. Wagner.

== Personal life ==
Fenves is married to Carmel Martinez Fenves, a textile artist and former small business owner. The couple has two adult daughters.

His father, Steven J. Fenves, was a Holocaust survivor from Subotica, Yugoslavia (now Serbia). After immigrating to the United States, he became a professor of engineering at institutions including the University of Illinois and Carnegie Mellon University.

Multiple family members from his father's side are also Holocaust survivors, including his aunt, some cousins, and his grandfather.

== Selected publications ==
- McKenna, F., Scott, M. H., & Fenves, G. L. (2010). "Nonlinear finite-element analysis software architecture using object composition." Journal of Computing in Civil Engineering, 24(1), 95–107.
- Scott, M. H., & Fenves, G. L. (2010). "Krylov subspace accelerated Newton algorithm: Application to dynamic progressive collapse simulation of frames." Journal of Structural Engineering, 136(5), 473–480.
- Ji, X., Fenves, G. L., Kajiwara, K., & Nakashima, M. (2010). "Seismic damage detection of a full-scale shaking table test structure." Journal of Structural Engineering, 136(6), 705–716.
- McKenna, F., & Fenves, G. L. (2007). "Open system for earthquake engineering simulation." University of California, Berkeley.
- Fenves, G. L., & Ellery, M. (1998). "Behavior and failure analysis of a multiple-frame highway bridge in the 1994 Northridge earthquake." Earthquake Spectra, 14(3), 377–396.
