= Earl Gladstone Hunt Jr. =

American Methodist pastor and evangelist

Earl Gladstone Hunt Jr. (1918–2005) was an American who distinguished himself as a Methodist pastor and evangelist, as the president of Emory and Henry College, as an author and theologian, as a bishop of The Methodist Church and the United Methodist Church (elected in 1964), and as a leader in World Methodism.

== Birth and family ==
Earl was born September 14, 1918, in Johnson City, Tennessee, the son of Earl Gladstone and Tommie Mae DeVault Hunt.

During his 46-year career, Hunt served at all levels of the United Methodist Church, and was active in the World Methodist Council, as well. He was also widely respected as an evangelist, earning the top awards given for outstanding evangelism in his denomination.

== Education ==
Earl earned a bachelor's degree from East Tennessee State University in 1941, and a divinity degree from the Candler School of Theology of Emory University in Atlanta in 1946.

== Ordained ministry ==
Earl was ordained a deacon in the Methodist Church in 1944, and an elder the following year. He began his pastoral ministry at the Sardis Methodist Church in Atlanta, Georgia as a student pastor while attending Candler. Returning to his home conference, the Holston Annual Conference, Rev. Hunt served churches in Kingsport, Chattanooga, and Morristown, Tennessee. In 1956 he was elected president of Emory and Henry College in Emory, Virginia, where he served for eight years.

== Episcopal ministry ==
He was elected bishop at the age of 46 by the Southeastern Jurisdictional Conference of the U.M. Church. He was assigned to lead the Charlotte Episcopal Area. During his twelve years there, he was able to appoint the first black pastor in the Southeastern Jurisdiction to serve as a district superintendent. He also organized a Lay Advisory Council.

In 1976 Bishop Hunt was assigned to the Church's Nashville Episcopal area. There he began his writing ministry, authoring several books on theology and evangelism.

Four years later, Bishop Hunt was assigned to the Florida Episcopal Area, where he served until 1988. While in Florida, he led the denomination's Committee on Our Theological Task. This committee spent nearly eight years perfecting a document addressing the Church's theological task in the world. In 1988 the General Conference adopted this document, which still appears in the denomination's Book of Discipline.

Bishop Hunt was the keynote speaker at the 1976 World Methodist Conference in Dublin, Ireland. He served ten years on the World Methodist Council's executive committee, and was awarded the World Methodist Chair of Honor in 1988.

== Ministry in retirement ==
Upon retiring in 1988, Bishop Hunt moved to Lake Junaluska, North Carolina. There he served as president of the Foundation for Evangelism, an affiliate ministry of the U.M. General Board of Discipleship. In 2002 the foundation honored him as a Lifetime Distinguished Evangelist of the U.M. Church, a rare honor indeed! Other honors received by Bishop Hunt include the Philip Award, given by the National Association of U.M. Evangelists. "Bishop Hunt was larger than life in so many ways," said Bishop Richard Looney, president of the Foundation for Evangelism.

== Selected writings ==
- A Bishop Speaks His Mind: A Candid View of United Methodism, Nashville: Abingdon Press, 1987. (ISBN 0687035651 ISBN 978-0-687-03565-6)
- I Have Believed: A Bishop Talks About His Faith, Nashville: Abingdon, 1980. (ISBN 0835804038 ISBN 978-0-8358-0403-5)
- Storms and Starlight (Bishops' Messages on the Holy Spirit), Earl G. Hunt Jr. (Editor), Nashville: Tidings, 1974.
- Recovering the Sacred: Papers From the Sanctuary and the Academy, Jonathan Creek Press, 1992. (ISBN 0963130803)
- Aspects of our Methodist heritage: With particular focus upon one of its distinguished transmitters, Bishop Roy Hunter Short, 1972.

== See also ==
- List of bishops of the United Methodist Church
