= Michael J. Kuhar =

American neuroscientist

- Born: Michael Joseph Kuhar; March 10, 1944; Scranton, Pennsylvania, US
- Education: University of Scranton, Johns Hopkins University, and Yale University
- Known for: Candler Professor of Neuropharmacology at The Yerkes National Primate Research Center of Emory University
- Spouse: Joan Barenburg
- Children: 2

Michael J. Kuhar (born 1944), is an American neuroscientist, author, and Candler Professor of Neuropharmacology at The Emory National Primate Research Center of Emory University. He is a Georgia Research Alliance eminent scholar, and a senior fellow in the Center for Ethics at Emory. He was previously a professor at Johns Hopkins University School of Medicine and branchchief at the National Institute on Drug Abuse.

Over his career, he has made discoveries in studies of drugs and the brain for which he has received a number of awards, and has contributed as a consultant to the government and industry, and as an expert witness in forensic cases.

== Biography ==
Kuhar was born in Scranton, Pennsylvania on March 10, 1944 and attended local schools. He obtained his BS degree in physics and philosophy from the University of Scranton in 1965. After spending a year at Harvard University in applied physics, he transferred to Johns Hopkins University to study biophysics and pharmacology. He obtained his PhD in 1970, and did a postdoctoral fellowship at Yale in the Department of Psychiatry. His focus was on how the brain works and on the mechanism of action of therapeutic drugs that are used to treat psychiatric illness. He then took a faculty position in the Department of Pharmacology at the Johns Hopkins University School of Medicine in 1972, becoming professor in 1981. In 1969, he married Joan Barenburg (1945-2008) and has two children. According to Emory University, he has more literary citations than any other Emory scientist and he is often an expert witness in both patent and medical malpractice legal cases.

== Academic career ==
The focus of Kuhar’s research has been on how the brain works by using chemical signaling (neurotransmission) and how drugs act in the brain. Early in his career at Johns Hopkins, he studied the neurotransmitter acetylcholine, which is important for the treatment for Alzheimer’s disease. He showed that the synthesis of acetylcholine was controlled by transporting substances into the nerve cell. He developed microscopic methods which are in current widespread use to identify and locate drug receptors in the brain. These involved autoradiography at first and then PET scanning later, including the first PET scans of receptors in the human brain.

He then moved to the National Institute on Drug Abuse in 1985 as head of its new Neuroscience Branch. His laboratory identified the molecular site in the brain responsible for the addicting properties of cocaine. This work explained the basic action of cocaine in the brain and suggested a target for developing medications for cocaine users. After ten years, Kuhar moved to the Emory National Primate Research Center of Emory University as head of the Neuroscience Division, and as Candler Professor of Neuropharmacology. Much of his work there focused on cocaine and on CART peptides. The peptides at least partly regulate the actions of cocaine in the brain as well as feeding and body weight. Other areas of research and publications include developing medications for cocaine addicts, studying the effects of early life stress on drug use in adulthood, and ethics.

== Recognition ==
Kuhar has been the President of College on Problems of drug Dependence as well as the International Drug Abuse Research society. Recognition he has received includes the 1984 Efron Award for outstanding basic research contributions by a young research scientist, the 1992 Otto Krayer Award for outstanding research by the American Society Of Pharmacology and Experimental Therapeutics, and the 2011 Nathan B Eddy Award for lifetime achievement from the College on Problems of Drug Dependence.
