= David Sherer =

- Born: 1957 (age 68–69)
- Citizenship: Boston University School of Medicine; Emory University

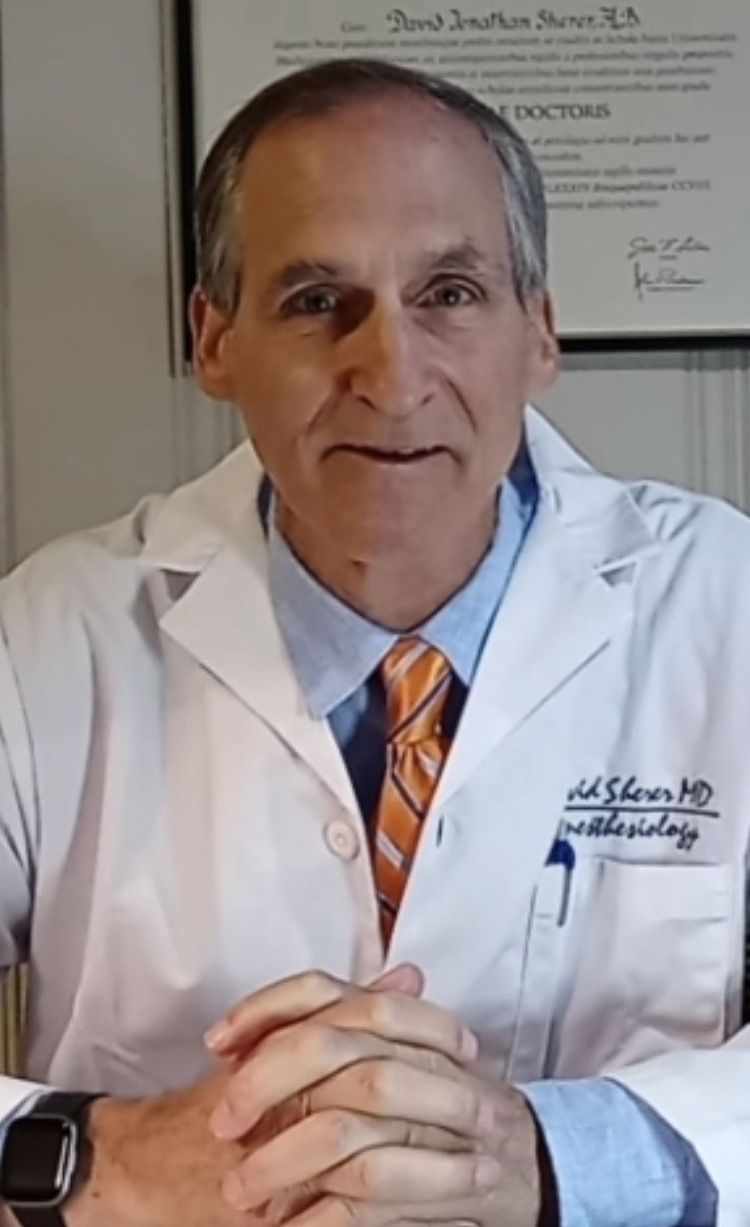
Dr. Sherer in his office.

David Sherer (born 1957), is an American physician and author. Through his awards and the many positive reviews of his books, as well as his work as an expert witness in malpractice cases and television appearances and video productions, he is a nationally recognized patient safety expert and authority on health and medicine. He is the lead author of The New York Times referenced book * (2/17/2004) Dr. David Sherer's Hospital Survival Guide: 100+ Ways to Make Your Hospital Stay Safe and Comfortable. Sherer wrote the monthly blog "What Your Doctor Isn't Telling You" for Bottom Line, Inc. of Stamford, Connecticut. He also appeared in videos produced by that company on a variety of health, medical and healthcare topics. His latest non-fiction book was released by Humanix on July 21, 2020. This book is an updated and expanded edition of his 2003 hospital book and is entitled "The Hospital Survival Guide". In 2021, Sherer released two more books, "What your doctor won't tell you" and his debut novel "Into the Ether".

== Biography ==
Dr. Sherer has a BA in music from Emory University (1979). He graduated from Boston University School of Medicine in 1984 and completed his anesthesiology residency at the University of Miami Jackson Memorial Hospital in 1989. He was certified by The American Board of Anesthesiology in 1991.

Sherer practiced anesthesiology in the suburbs of Washington, D.C., until his retirement from clinical medicine in 2019. He now heads Consolidated Medicine, a medical practice and consulting group headquartered in Chevy Chase, Maryland, that consists of four divisions: clinical, literary, medico-legal and financial consulting.

Beginning in July, 2022, his new quarterly column "Wake Up Call" appeared in "Anesthesiology News". His many articles and videos produced in conjunction with Bottom Line Publications can be found on their website and on YouTube.
