= Doug Bremner =

American physician, researcher, and writer (born 1961)

James Douglas Bremner
- Born: June 5, 1961 (age 65); Topeka, Kansas, United States
- Education: University of Puget Sound; Duke University School of Medicine
- Occupations: Physician; researcher; writer
- Known for: The Goose That Laid the Golden Egg: Accutane, the truth that had to be told
- Website: dougbremner.com

James Douglas Bremner (born June 5, 1961) is an American physician, researcher, and writer based in Atlanta, Georgia. He has conducted research on posttraumatic stress disorder and the relationship between depression and suicide and the acne drug Accutane (Roaccutane, or isotretinoin).

== Early life and education ==
Bremner was born in Topeka, Kansas and was raised in Olympia, Washington. He received a B.A. in English literature from the University of Puget Sound, and a medical degree from Duke University School of Medicine. He did residencies in psychiatry and nuclear medicine at the Yale University School of Medicine.

== Career ==
Bremner was an assistant and associate professor of psychiatry and radiology at the Yale University School of Medicine and National Center for PTSD from 1991 to 2000 and Professor of Psychiatry and Radiology, Director of the Emory Clinical Neuroscience Research Unit, at the Emory University School of Medicine in Atlanta, Georgia. He has also served as Director of Mental Health Research at the Atlanta Veterans Administration Medical Center in Decatur, Georgia since 2000.

Bremner's brain imaging studies showed smaller volume of the hippocampus in people with post traumatic stress disorder related to childhood abuse or Vietnam combat; he was the first to publish on the topic of that relationship. These studies and others resulted in him being one of the most highly cited researchers in the field of post traumatic stress disorder.

Bremner's research used PET brain imaging to show a decrease in frontal lobe brain function in acne patients treated with Accutane (isotretinoin). He was an expert witness in litigation related to the relationship between Accutane and suicide and depression, including the case of Charles J. Bishop, which he describes in the narrative non-fiction book The Goose That Laid the Golden Egg.

Bremner's activities as a healthcare consumer advocate and activist include authorship of Before You Take That Pill: Why the Drug Industry May Be Bad for Your Health: Risks and Side Effects You Won't Find on the Label of Commonly Prescribed Drugs, Vitamins, and Supplements. He is frequently quoted by the media in stories related to risks of prescription medications. He has also appeared multiple times on CNN's HLN (TV network) and truTV, discussing medical and mental health aspects of crime stories in the news. He was an active participant in protests related to the Grady Memorial Hospital dialysis crisis of 2009, which contributed to a successful outcome for the affected patients.

Bremner has authored or co-authored over 200 peer reviewed scientific articles, book chapters, and books in the field of PTSD, depression, and drug safety.

He is on the editorial boards of several journals and the Scientific Advisory and Executive Boards of several foundations dedicated to promoting mental health of military personnel deployed to the conflicts in Iraq and Afghanistan. He has received several awards for his work, including the Chaim and Bela Danieli Award for Research and Service in Traumatic Stress from the International Society for Traumatic Stress Studies.

Bremner is also a screenwriter with awards including Quarterfinalist at the 2011 PAGE International Screenwriters Awards.

== Publications ==
- Trauma, Memory, and Dissociation (Co-edited with Charles Marmar) ISBN 978-1-58562-145-3 (American Psychiatric Press, 1998)
- Posttraumatic Stress Disorder: A Comprehensive Text (Co-edited with Philip A. Saigh) ISBN 978-0-205-26734-7 (Wiley & Sons, 1999)
- Does Stress Damage the Brain? ISBN 978-0-393-70474-7 (WW Norton, 2002)
- Brain Imaging Handbook ISBN 978-0-393-70414-3 (WW Norton, 2005)
- Before You Take That Pill: Why the Drug Industry May Be Bad For Your Health. ISBN 978-1-58333-295-5 (Avery/Penguin, 2008).
- The Goose That Laid the Golden Egg: Accutane, the truth that had to be told. ISBN 978-1-4636-4881-7 (Nothing But Publishing, Ltd., 2011).
