= Philip A. Amerson =

Theological educator, pastor, and social researcher

- Born: January 1, 1946 (age 80)
- Education: Asbury Theological Seminary; Emory University
- Occupations: Theological educator, Pastor, social researcher, seminary president
- Website: philipamerson.com

Philip Amos Amerson (born January 1, 1946) is a theological educator, pastor and social researcher. He served as president of Garrett-Evangelical Theological Seminary and the Claremont School of Theology.

== Early life and education ==
Amerson was born in southern Indiana and raised in a Methodist pastor's home. After graduating from Shortridge High School in Indianapolis he attended Asbury College and Asbury Theological Seminary in Kentucky. His doctoral work was done at Emory University where he studied the Sociology of Religion under Jackson Carroll and Earl D. C. Brewer. During this time he wrote Racism and Suburban Congregations: Strategies for Change.

== Career ==
Amerson worked in several academic and religious settings, and also engaged in research on urban parishes for the Lilly Endowment. From 1970 through 2000 he divided his time between academic research and the church, teaching in colleges and graduate schools. He also taught for a year in the Republic of Panama at the Instituto Pan Americano. In 1977 Amerson and his wife, Dr. Elaine (Mallard) Amerson left teaching posts at Emory University to become founding members of an intentional Christian Community, Patchwork Ministries, in Evansville, Indiana; they there stayed until 1986. While serving as parish pastor in Indianapolis and Bloomington, Indiana Amerson continued to function as a researcher and consultant.

In the 1980s Amerson began to write, speak and teach about institutional leadership, urban community development and the role of congregations in addressing poverty and discrimination. His work in these years was influenced by conversations with Robert K. Greenleaf. Amerson studied the role of Servant Leadership in urban parish life and interpreted Greenleaf's writings on the role of theological seminaries.

Amerson met John McKnight, an initiator of the Asset Based Community Development movement, at Northwestern University. McKnight's critique of the social service industry and helping institutions influenced Amerson to focus more of his own work on building on the capacities found among the residents of poor communities. He was additionally influenced by Herman B Wells, a member of his parish in Bloomington, Indiana, and president and chancellor of Indiana University, to study the development of social institutions.

In 2000 he became the president of Claremont School of Theology and then in 2006 moved to the presidency of Garrett-Evangelical Theology Seminary on the Campus of Northwestern University. During these years he served two terms as leader of the Association of United Methodist Theological Schools and Senator and Vice-President of the United Methodist University Senate.

Amerson wrote and spoke of his concerns that his denomination gave preference to those in wealthy and suburban settings and practiced discrimination based on sexual orientation. He was an elected delegate to the world gathering of United Methodists at their General Conferences in 1992, 1996, 2000 and 2004. He was a presenter on academic topics and a convener at several gatherings of the Oxford Institutes of Methodist Theological Studies, which occur every five years.

After retiring from seminary administration he served as interim senior pastor of St. Andrew United Methodist Church in Highlands Ranch, Colorado (2014) and First United Methodist, San Diego, California (2018–19). He continues to undertake consulting, writing and research from his home in Bloomington, Indiana.

== Publications ==
- “The Vocation of Peacebuilding,” with John W. Woell, in Choosing Peace Through Daily Practices, Ellen Ott Marshall, editor; Cleveland: Pilgrim Press, 2005.
- Tell Me City Stories: A Journey for Urban Congregations, Eugene, OR: Wipf and Stevens Publishers, 2003.
- "Legacy of a Lightweight” in First Fruits, David Mosser and Brian Bauknight, editors; Nashville: Abingdon, 2003.
- "Clockwork Theology," Circuit Rider, January/February 2000.
- "Decline or Transformation? Another View of Mainline Finances" with Edward Stephenson and Jan Shipps, The Christian Century, February 5, 1997.
- "Public Ministry: Chronicles of Capacity Building," in Envisioning the New City: A Reader on Urban Ministry, Eleanor Scott Meyers, editor; Westminster/John Knox Press, 1992.
- "The Urban Church: Flight Time or Staying Power," Circuit Rider (Dec./Jan. 1990 - 1991).
- "Faith and Social Ministry: United Methodism," with Earl D. C. Brewer, in Faith and Social Ministry: An Interfaith Dialogue (Loyola University Press, 1990).
- "Miracle on Twenty-ninth Street," The Other Side, April 1988.
- "Inside Story: A Parable," The Other Side, September 1988.
- "For Those Who Bear the Bounty," The Other Side, December 1984.
- "Master Teacher and Disciples: An Old and Good Model," Cities, Winter 1984.
- "Ministry on the Urban Frontier: Access and Retirement," in Signs of the Kingdom in the Secular City; David Frenchak, ed., (Chicago: Covenant Press) 1984.
- "Strategy and Urban Ministry," Cities, Summer 1983.
- "On Asking Fish to Jump Into a Barrel: Reflections on Urban Evangelization," The Covenant Quarterly, May 1982.
- "Trends in Lifestyle Research," Review of Religious Research, Summer 1979.
- "Excess or Access," Sojourners, July 1979.
- "The Suburban Church and Racism: Is Change Possible?" with Jackson W. Carroll, Review of Religious Research, Summer 1979.
- "If People Knew the Truth, They'd Panic," Sojourners, January 1979.
- "Congregations and Racial Change," with Jackson W. Carroll, Hartford Seminary Foundation, 1975.
- “Inventory of Institutional Racism," with Jackson Carroll, Advance, October 1974.
- "Fighting White Racism in the Churches," Convergence, May 1974.
