= Robert Wayne Alexander =

American biologist

- Born: March 19, 1941; Memphis, Tennessee
- Died: January 6, 2023 (aged 81)
- Education: University of Mississippi, Emory University, Duke University School of Medicine
- Spouse: Jane Mansfield Woods
- Children: 3
- Scientific career
- Fields: Biology, Cardiology

Robert Wayne Alexander (March 19, 1941 – January 6, 2023) was an American biologist and cardiologist known for research in the fields of atherosclerosis, hypertension, and vascular biology.

== Early life and education ==
Robert Wayne Alexander was born on March 19, 1941, in Memphis, Tennessee.

After he graduated high school, Alexander was accepted to the University of Mississippi where he graduated in 1962. Alexander then attended classes at Emory University While at Emory, Alexander was a regular at the Emory faculty's Saturday Morning Clinical Cardiology at Grady Memorial Hospital. In 1967 he obtained from Emory University his M.S Degree and a year later he obtained his Ph.D. Upon graduation from Emory, Alexander attended Duke University School of Medicine, graduated in 1969, and then began an internship under James Wyngaarden. He would return to Duke in the mid-1970s to complete his cardiology fellowship as a member of the United States Public Health Service. Alexander took up residency at the University of Washington School of Medicine which he completed a few years later.

== Career ==
Alexander was the Senior Surgeon at the Experimental Therapeutics Branch of the National Heart and Lung Institute until 1976 when he became a Harvard Medical School faculty member at the Peter Bent Brigham Hospital. In 1982, he became an Associate Professor of Medicine at Harvard. In 1988, he became the R. Bruce Logue Professor of Medicine and Director of the Division of Cardiology at Emory University in Atlanta where he attended years before. He kept all of the college's faculty and he brought in new researchers. Five years later Alexander co-founded Atherogenics Inc. and he served as its director and board member until 2009. Alexander became Emory University School of Medicine Chair in 1999. In 2013, Alexander stepped down as Emory University's department of medicine chairman but he stayed on with the department of cardiology in a faculty role.

== Research ==
Alexander began his research while he studied for his Ph.D. at Emory University. He published over 250 scientific publications and provided edits for ten books. Alexander has contributed notably to the vascular biology field of study taking it from basic observations to applications that could be applied clinically, including drug development. The editors at Hurst's the Heart selected Alexander as one of the people to contribute to the textbook. Alexander directly has supervised twenty-five postdoctoral fellows. An award at Emory University Atlanta (R. Wayne Alexander Excellence in Research Accomplishment Award) is named after Alexander. Alexander has been a part of organizations such as the American Heart Association. He's been on the editorial board of various journals.

=== Controversy ===
In the early 2010s, six of the papers that belonged to Alexander's research group were retracted. Co-author Lian Zuo was blamed for the first of three retracted papers but not for the newer ones which were retracted for image manipulation. The newer retracted published papers were from the early-mid 2000s and were in the Journal of Biological Chemistry, in circulation (one paper), and on Arteriosclerosis, Thrombosis, and Vascular Biology (two papers).

== Personal life ==
In 1971, Alexander married Jane Mansfield Woods and they had three children together. Alexander died on January 6, 2023, due to neurodegenerative disease.
