= Heidi Blanck =

American public health epidemiologist

Captain Heidi Michels Blanck is an American public health epidemiologist, nutrition and obesity researcher, and officer of the US Public Health Service Commissioned Corps. Blanck is currently chief of the Obesity Prevention and Control Branch at the Centers for Disease Control and Prevention (CDC) and a senior advisor at the CDC.

Blanck received a PhD in Nutrition and Health Sciences from Emory University, and holds an adjunct professor position there. Blanck is a member of the National Academy of Sciences and is also on the editorial board of the medical journal Childhood Obesity.
