= Benn Konsynski =

American academic of management/IT

- Known for: Decision support, inter-organizational information systems, business
- Awards: George S. Craft Distinguished University Professor, Baxter Research Fellow at Harvard, Hewlett Fellow at The Carter Center

Academic work
- Discipline: Information Systems, Business, Operations Management
- Institutions: Emory University, Goizueta Business School, Harvard Business School, University of Arizona,

Benn Konsynski has been the George S. Craft Distinguished University Professor of Information Systems and Operations Management at the Goizueta Business School at Emory University since 1994. Previously, he spent six years on the faculty at the Harvard Business School, where he taught in the MBA program and several executive programs. He also served as professor at the University of Arizona, where he was a co-founder of the university's multimillion-dollar group decision support laboratory. He holds a Ph.D. in Computer Science from Purdue University. He did a dissertation on "Computer Aided Logical Applications Software Design" under advisors Jay Frank Nunamaker Jr. and Andrew Bernard Whinston. He was also named Baxter Research Fellow at Harvard, and Hewlett Fellow at The Carter Center.

Konsynski specializes in issues of digital commerce and information technology in relationships across organizations and he has published in such diverse journals as Communications of the ACM, Harvard Business Review, IEEE Transactions on Communications, MIS Quarterly, Journal of MIS, Data Communications, Decision Sciences, Decision Support Systems, Information Systems Research, and IEEE Transactions on Software Engineering. He is Director and founder of Emory University's Center for Digital Commerce. He has a strong following among his MBA students, who refer to themselves as S.O.B.'s (Students of Benn).

Konsynski has served as a consultant on management and technology issues with many organizations. Some of the companies include, UPS, IBM, TESSCO Technologies, Harbinger Corporation, AT&T, Northern Trust, Texas Instruments, the U.S. Army, Digital Equipment Corporation, Northwestern Mutual Life Insurance Company, MicroAge, Ernst and Young, the Bank of Montreal, Plasti-line, J.C. Penney, Aetna Insurance Company, Turner Broadcasting Corporation, and Dillard's Department Stores. He serves on the board of directors at TESSCO Technologies, Miller-Zell, NuBridges, The Management Education Alliance, and other companies and non-profit institutions.

Konsynski was part of the committee of faculty and students that organized Emory University's India Summit on February 17–18, 2014. At the India Summit in 2012 Konsynski was on a panel titled “Technology, Identity, and Privacy: The Promise and Perils of India’s National Identity System". The India Summit has sought to build a strong relationship between India and Emory.
