= Timothy W. Whitaker =

American Methodist bishop

Timothy Wayne Whitaker (October 5 1948 - March 28, 2024) was a bishop of the United Methodist Church, elected in 2001. Whitaker distinguished himself as a U.M. pastor, a college lecturer, a member of Annual Conference and U.M. General Agencies and community organizations, a district superintendent, an author, and as a bishop.

== Birth and family ==
Whitaker was born October 5, 1948, in Vicksburg, Mississippi, graduating from Warren Central High School, Warren County, Mississippi, in 1966. He is married to Melba J. Jarvis of Brandon, Mississippi. They have two sons: Scott, married to Michele Wrobleski of Buffalo, New York living on the Eastern Shore of Virginia, and Eric married to Thao (Mary N. Whitaker) T. Nguyen (of Vietnam) living in Sioux Falls South Dakota . Scott is a poet and English/drama teacher at a local high school, and Eric is an assistant manager with Smart Financial Ent. They have five grandchildren. Thor Leo Whitaker, Ivan Aquila Whitaker, Brian Jayden Whitaker, Timothy James Whitaker; and Richard John Whitaker.

Whitaker passed March 28, 2014 at his home in Keller, Virginia.

== Education ==
Whitaker earned an Associate of Arts degree from Hinds Junior College, and a B.A. from Millsaps College in Jackson, Mississippi (summa cum laude, 1970). He earned a M.Div. degree from Candler School of Theology, Emory University (summa cum laude, 1973). He has been awarded numerous academic honors, including admission to Phi Alpha Theta (history honorary society) and Theta Phi (theology society). He also received the Award for Academic Excellence from Candler in 1973.

== Ordained ministry ==
He received a license to preach in the Mississippi Annual Conference of the United Methodist Church in 1968. He was ordained a deacon in 1971 and elder in 1974. He served as pastor of the following U.M. churches: Carlisle-Rocky Springs (Student Pastor, 1967–70), Fayette Circuit (Student, July–August, 1970); Minister to Youth at Druid Hills U.M.C., Atlanta, Georgia (1971–72); Forsyth Circuit, North Georgia Conference (Student, 1972–73); Spring Ridge U.M.C., Mississippi (1973–75). During the Fall Semester, 1974, Timothy also served as a lecturer on "American Religious Thought" at Millsaps College.

Whitaker transferred to the Virginia Conference in 1975, where he served these appointments: St. Peter's U.M.C. (1975–78); Franktown-Johnsons (1978–83); Farmville (1983–87), also serving as a lecturer on "History of Philosophy" at Eastern Shore Community College during 1983. He was the Pastor of the Mt. Pisgah U.M.C.(1987–93) and the Centenary U.M.C. (1993–97), both in the Richmond District. He was appointed superintendent of the Norfolk District of the Virginia Conference (1997–2001), from which he was elected to the Episcopacy.

In the Virginia Conference, Whitaker served on many Conference agencies: president of the Board of Discipleship, vice president of the Board of Global Ministries, and chair of the Division of Elders of the Board of Ordained Ministry. He was also involved in a number of community service agencies, including hospice, sheltered workshops, a soup kitchen, and tutoring of inner city children.

== Episcopal election ==
Whitaker was elected bishop by a special called session of the Southeastern Jurisdictional Conference of the U.M. Church, 26–27 February 2001 to fill the episcopal vacancy created by the death of Bishop Cornelius L. Henderson, who died 7 December 2000 after a two-year battle with cancer. The session took place at Lake Junaluska, North Carolina. Whitaker had been nominated on the first ballot on 26 February. However, he withdrew from the election in a 10-minute presentation to the delegates.

He had not accepted nomination nor endorsement from his annual conference delegation prior to this special session because he did not want to go through the election process again. He said nomination would have been a distraction to his life and ministry during a time when he was becoming refocused. He had been a nominee and a strong contender during elections at the Jurisdictional Conference July 2000. When competition for the third episcopal position narrowed to him and one other candidate that time, he withdrew, paving the way for the election of Bishop James R. King Jr.

Nevertheless, his name re-emerged on the 13th ballot, taking a significant lead over the two leading nominees on the 15th ballot. Bishop Whitaker was elected on the 17th ballot, with 395 out of 497 valid votes. He needed only 299 votes to be elected. Bishop-elect Whitaker said in an interview following the announcement, "I am stunned by my election. I had decided I did not want to be a candidate."

== Selected writings ==
- articles in The Christian Century, Circuit Rider, Lectionary Homiletics and the Richmond Times-Dispatch.

== See also ==
- List of bishops of the United Methodist Church
