= Claire E. Sterk =

Dutch scientist

20th President of Emory University
- In office September 1, 2016 – August 1, 2020
- Preceded by: James W. Wagner
- Succeeded by: Gregory L. Fenves

Personal details
- Born: Claire Elizabeth Sterk; 1957 (age 68–69) Netherlands
- Education: Vrije Universiteit Amsterdam; Erasmus University (PhD); University of Utrecht (DRS)
- Profession: Academic administrator
- Website: https://web.gs.emory.edu/vulnerability/faculty/bios/sterk-claire.html

Claire Elizabeth Sterk is a Dutch scientist and Charles Howard Candler Professor of Public Health at Emory University. Sterk held faculty positions in medical anthropology, sociology, and women's health, gender, and sexuality studies at Emory. From 2016 to 2020 she served as president of Emory University.

== Research ==
Sterk has been Charles Howard Candler Professor of Public Health at Emory since 2000. Sterk is a leading figure in both public health and anthropology studying addiction, mental health, and HIV/AIDS. She was the first person to identify the risk of HIV infection due to unprotected sex among crack cocaine users.

Sterk received a PhD in sociology from Erasmus University in Rotterdam and her doctorandus degree in medical anthropology from the University of Utrecht. Her undergraduate degree is from the Free University in Amsterdam.

Sterk is the author of two books—Fast Lives: Women Who Use Crack Cocaine and Tricking and Tripping: Prostitution in the Era of AIDS. She has since written another book. She has also published more than 100 articles and book chapters.

She became President of Emory on September 1, 2016. Prior to that time, she had served as provost and executive vice president for academic affairs. She held the position of president in the Alcohol, Drug, and Tobacco section of the American Sociological Association. Sterk is the principal investigator of Building Interdisciplinary Research Careers in Women's Health, which is funded by the Eunice Kennedy Shriver National Institute of Child Health and Human Development.

In November 2019, Sterk announced that she would resign as Emory president at the end of the 2019–2020 school year and return to teaching in the Rollins School of Public Health.

Sterk speaks four languages.

== Honors and awards ==
She was elected to the National Academy of Medicine in 2018 and elected as a fellow of the American Academy of Arts and Sciences in 2019.
