= Emory Center for Alternative Investments =

Coordinates: 33.79005°N 84.321424°W

- Established: 2008; 18 years ago
- Affiliations: Emory University Goizueta Business School
- Executive Director: Klaas Baks
- Location: Atlanta, Georgia, United States
- Website: emorycai.com

The Emory Center for Alternative Investments is an American financial research institution that is part of the Goizueta Business School at Emory University. The center seeks to provide independent research to the alternative investment industry through papers, conferences, and education.

The center primarily focuses on the needs of institutional investors as they navigate the many options available in the alternative investment industry but also partners with asset managers to conduct research in an effort to remain objective. The Center for Alternative Investments focuses on hedge funds, private equity, venture capital, and real estate.

== History ==
In 2007, Emory University's Goizueta Business School received a $10 million gift to establish the Emory Center for Alternative Investments. In the spring of the following year, Klaas Baks was appointed executive director of the center.

The primary objective of the Center for Alternative Investments is to provide research into the most important challenges faced by institutional investors who invest in alternative investments. It studies a variety of problems ranging from best practice to public policy and industry perception.

In addition, the center was conceived as a meeting place for people interested and active in alternative investments. The center also aims to engage students and practitioners alike through classes, executive education, seminars, and networking events.

== Research and academic contributions ==
=== Course offerings ===
- Venture Capital and Private Equity
- Distress Investing
- Doing Deals: Private Equity
- Illiquid frontiers in Alternative investments
- Applied investment management
- Investment Banking
- Corporate governance and restructuring
- Securities analysis and portfolio management
- Advanced managerial finance
- Fixed income securities
- Derivative asset analysis

=== Publications ===
- On the Valuation of Venture Capital and Private Equity Securities
- Becker, Bo, and Joshua Pollet. "The decision to go private." Unpublished working paper (2008).
- Constraint on the Control Benefits of Brokerage: Evidence from U.S. Venture Capital Fundraising
- Embedding inter-organizational relations in organizational members' prior education and employment networks
- Risk and Expected Returns on Private Equity Investments: Evidence Based on Market Prices

=== White papers ===
- Interest alignment in the Private Equity Industry
- A research agenda for alternative investments: a Limited Partner's perspective

== Student involvement ==
=== Alternative Investments Group ===
The center sponsors a student group on campus, the Alternative Investments Group, which sponsors case competitions and brings industry speakers to campus. The group consists of juniors and seniors at the Goizueta Business School who want to expand their understanding of alternative investments and hope to pursue a career in alternative investments.

=== Case competitions ===
Each year the Alternative Investments Group hosts case competitions open to graduate and undergraduate students. The competitions include a Hedge Fund Competition wherein competitors devise an investment strategy and execute it over a three-month trading period, a Venture Capital Competition that allows students to simulate making an investment with an entrepreneur, and a Private Equity competition where competitors construct a buyout of a public company and pitch their investment recommendation. All of the competitions are judged by professionals actively working in the respective industries, giving the participants the unique opportunity to receive feedback and advice from experts at hedge funds, venture capital shops, and private equity funds.

=== Alternative Investments Network ===
The center's extended alumni network, The Alternative Investments Network, serves Emory alumni, students, and their colleagues who work or are interested in alternative investments, including private equity, hedge funds, venture capital, and real estate. The organization connects and expands the Emory community in these fields, and offers an ongoing series of events and opportunities in support of this effort. The network has established a presence in both the New York and Atlanta areas, and allows members to become integrally involved with Center and expand their professional networks.

== Faculty ==
=== Leadership ===
- Klaas Baks (executive director)
- Lawrence M. Benveniste (faculty advisor)
- Roy Black (Director of Real Estate Program)
- T. Clifton Green (faculty advisor)

=== Affiliated faculty ===
- Mark Bell
- Kevin Crowley
- Kathryn Furman
- John Grayken
- Roman Kraussl
- David Panton
