= Alyasah Ali Sewell =

American sociologist and academic

Alyasah "Ali" Sewell
- Education: Indiana University Bloomington; University of Florida
- Scientific career
- Workplaces: University of Pennsylvania; Emory University
- Thesis: Opening the black box of segregation : structures of racial health disparities (2013)

Alyasah "Ali" Sewell is an American sociologist who is an associate professor at Emory University. They are the founding director of the Race and Policing Project and the Critical Racism Data Lab. Their research develops quantitative approaches to understand racism.

== Early life and education ==
Ali Sewell was an undergraduate student at the University of Florida, where they graduated in social sciences and women's studies in 2005. They moved to Indiana University Bloomington for their graduate studies, where they specialized in social science and completed a master's in 2008 and a doctorate in 2013. Their doctoral research looked at the segregation and racial disparities in health outcomes. They identified sources of health deprivation amongst young people that were related to race and racism. They were a postdoctoral researcher in the Population Studies Center at the University of Pennsylvania.

== Research and career ==
Sewell studied proactive policing and the consequences of police violence on women and communities of color. Their research considers the relationships between ethnicity and healthcare disparities amongst different demographic groups in America.

In 2021, Sewell was involved with the United States' first National LGBTQ+ Women's Community Survey. The survey looked to collect and document the experiences of LGBTQ people across America. It emphasized the importance of living in a loving community, and found that more than half of the respondents had experienced intimate partner violence.

In 2022, Sewell founded the Critical Racism Data Lab. The lab trains people on the ethical collection, use and application of sociological data, and brings science to communities who were previously marginalized. Sewell created a repository of accessible information on race and policing, which became increasingly significant following the murder of George Floyd.

In 2024, Sewell was appointed the Emory University Winship Distinguished Research Professor.

== Selected publications ==
- Abigail A Sewell; Kevin A Jefferson (15 January 2016). "Collateral Damage: The Health Effects of Invasive Police Encounters in New York City". Journal of Urban Health. 93 Suppl 1: 42–67. doi:10.1007/s11524-015-0016-7. ISSN 1099-3460. PMC 4824697. PMID 26780583. Wikidata Q36777703.
- Abigail A Sewell; Kevin A Jefferson; Hedwig Lee (22 April 2016). "Living under surveillance: Gender, psychological distress, and stop-question-and-frisk policing in New York City". Social Science & Medicine. 159: 1–13. doi:10.1016/j.socscimed.2016.04.024. ISSN 0277-9536. PMID 27155224. Wikidata Q39786650.
- Abigail A Sewell (27 June 2015). "Disaggregating ethnoracial disparities in physician trust". Social Science Research. 54: 1–20. doi:10.1016/j.ssresearch.2015.06.020. ISSN 0049-089X. PMID 26463531. Wikidata Q50773778.
