= Nelson Adams =

American physician (born 1953)

Nelson L. Adams III (born 1 February 1953) is an American physician Ob/Gyn. He served as president of the National Medical Association and founder and president of Access Health Solutions, LLC.

== Early years ==
Adams was born in Miami, Florida where he attended Miami Jackson Senior High School and received a Silver Knight Award nomination. After graduating in 1970, he earned a B.A. in zoology from Howard University in 1974, and his M.D. from Meharry Medical College in 1978. At Meharry, he was named Student of the Year in his freshman class, and served as president of the Meharry Chapter of the Student National Medical Association.

Adams attended Emory University in Atlanta, where he completed his internship in 1979. He completed his residency in obstetrics and gynecology in 1982. He opened his first private practice in Mobile, Alabama in September 1982 shortly after.

== Career ==
Adams moved his practice to Miami Shores, Florida in 1986. He became vice president of network development for Sheridan Healthcorp in March 1995. From December 1999 to January 2004, he served as medical director for Greater Miami OB-GYN Associates at Sheridan Healthcorp.

He founded Access Health Solutions in February 2004 and serves as its president and chairman. He was sworn in as the 108th president of the 112-year-old National Medical Association during its annual convention and scientific assembly in Honolulu, Hawaii on August 7, 2007.

In 2008, he launched "Walk a Mile with a Child", an annual event designed to increase awareness and emphasize community health education. The inaugural walk was held in the Overtown section of Miami on April 19, 2008. The first official walk was held in Atlanta, Georgia on July 31, 2008, during the NMA's annual convention.

On June 24, 2008, Adams testified before the House Energy and Commerce Subcommittee on Health in support of the Health Equity and Accountability Act of 2007, which sought to reduce ethnic disparities in health care, improve "cultural competency" among medical providers, and improve medical workplace diversity. Adams was a panelist during a National Hispanic Medical Association Congressional Lunch Briefing for members of Congress and staff. They discussed strategies to lower health care costs by addressing health disparities and spotlighting reform coalitions, which included health disparities in their agenda.

On July 2, 2008, he was a panelist during a conference of the 37th Annual Conference of Rainbow PUSH Coalition in Chicago, called "Closing the Health Gap: The Civil Right to Health Care", which examined the role of discrimination and other factors in explaining the health gap.

Adams presided as the Clinical Professor in the OB/GYN Department at the Florida International University College of Medicine, starting in 2010 and ending in 2018.

In 2025, Howard University honored Adams with the Alumni Award for Distinguished Postgraduate Achievement, noting his career as a pioneer in maternal and child health and his advocacy for eliminating racial and ethnic health disparities.

Adams is a member of the Board of Trustees of Meharry Medical College, Barry University, the Miami Art Museum, and St. John Community Development Organization. He sits on the board of directors of the Overtown Youth Center in Miami and other organizations.

Adams received the Alumni Award for Distinguished Postgraduate Achievement from Howard University for his contributions. He was recognized for this at the Charter Day 2025 Dinner on March 1,2025.

== Personal life ==
Adams is married to Effie Jones with whom he has two children. He is the grandson of Nelson Leon Adams (1877–1971), for whom the Adams Middle School was established 1967 in Saraland, Alabama.

Adams passed away Saturday September 12th, 2026.
