= Timothy Harlan =

American internist, chef and author

Timothy S. Harlan is an American internist, professor, chef and author. He currently is Professor of Medicine, George Washington University School of Medicine, where he also is executive director of the Culinary Medicine Program.

He is the writer of: It’s Heartly Fare, Hand on Heart, The Dr. Gourmet Diet for Coumadin Users and Just Tell Me What to Eat!. His best-known book, Just Tell Me What to Eat!: the delicious 6-week weight loss plan for the real world is available in 491 libraries, according to worldCat. His work has been featured in The New York Times, The Wall Street Journal and on CNN, among other top-tier media outlets. Harlan won an Emmy award in 2002 for excellence in medical programming for his “Dr. Gourmet Show” television program.

== Early life ==
Harlan began working as dishwasher in a restaurant when he was eleven years old. He attended Admiral Farragut Academy in New Jersey for high school and continued to work in the restaurant business during his teenage years. This restaurant experience allowed him to learn cooking techniques from many top chefs.

Harlan became the manager of his first restaurant when he was eighteen years old. At twenty-two years old, he opened his own restaurant, Le Petit Cafe, in Athens, Georgia. He created the menus for his restaurant, worked as a chef and taught cooking classes. Harlan closed his French bistro when he went back to school.

== Education ==
Harlan originally planned to earn a degree in hotel and restaurant management but family illness led him to become a physician instead. From 1985 to 1987, he attended Emory University in Atlanta, Georgia and pursued a double major in biology and anthropology.

After he graduated, he remained in Atlanta, Georgia and attended Emory University School of Medicine from 1987 until 1994. During this time, he worked as a caterer and wrote his first book, It’s Heartly Fare, for patients with cardiovascular disease.

Harlan completed his residency at Emory University School of Medicine Affiliated Hospitals.

== Career ==
Harlan took his current position at GWU in 2019. Prior to that, he was the associate chief of general internal medicine and geriatrics for outpatient programs at the Tulane University School of Medicine. He also was medical director of the Tulane University Medical Group and executive director of the Goldring Center for Culinary Medicine, the first teaching kitchen at a medical school. In addition, he is the owner of Harlan Bros. Productions and publishes his website, DrGourmet.com.

=== Books ===
Harlan's first book, It’s Heartly Fare, is a food manual for patients with cardiovascular disease. It’s Heartly Fare was first published by Pritchett Hull & Associates in September 1991 and the fifth edition was released in fall 2006. The main focus of the book is to learn a new way of eating that cuts down the saturated fat, sugar and salt in a person's diet.

His second book, Hand on Heart, was published in September 2004 by ENDpapers publishing. Hand on Heart teaches readers how to eat a balanced diet. The book includes healthy versions of familiar recipes, as well as an 'Equipment Starter Kit' and a 'Healthy Pantry' list to inform readers which materials and ingredients they will need to make the recipes.

The Dr. Gourmet Diet for Coumadin Users was published in 2009 by Harlan Bros. Productions. The book contains six weeks worth of recipes for meals, shopping lists, recipe nutrition facts, and ingredient and cooking tips that allow Coumadin users to follow a healthy diet.

Harlan's latest book, Just Tell Me What to Eat!, was released on June 7, 2011, by Da Capo Press, a member of the Perseus Books Group. Just Tell Me What to Eat! offers a six-week weight loss plan that is based on the Mediterranean diet. The book informs readers how to lose weight by following a sustainable diet instead of a fad diet.

=== Television ===
Harlan has been an on-air consultant to the TV Food Network show, Cooking Thin, as well as a host for the show, AskDIY, aired by the DIY Network. He also has had his own television program, The Dr. Gourmet Show, which won an Emmy award for excellence in medical programming after being aired on a regional public station.

=== Dr. Gourmet persona ===
In January 1984, Harlan created his Dr. Gourmet website. Using several media outlets through his company, Harlan Brothers Productions, Dr. Gourmet acts as a resource for those who want to lose weight, lower their cholesterol or generally improve their diet.

DrGourmet.com, includes a free, interactive diet planner, "The Dr. Gourmet Diet Plan", to help people create weekly meal plans using recipes and shopping lists. "The Dr. Gourmet Diet Plan" focuses on the main goal of Dr. Gourmet: to provide information to people on how to eat a balanced diet while accommodating food allergies, gastroesophageal reflux disease, lactose intolerance, and those who use Coumadin (warfarin).

== Personal life ==
Harlan has been a member of the Rotary International since 1996.

Since 1995 he has been a member of board of trustees for Randolph-Macon Academy, a military school in Front Royal, Virginia,

Served as an advisory board member of Livestrong.com from May 2008 until May 2009.
