= Richard Carl Looney =

American bishop

Richard Carl Looney (born 14 February 1934) is a retired American Bishop of the United Methodist Church, elected in 1988.

== Birth and family ==
Looney was born in the Methodist parsonage at Hillsville, Virginia. He married Carolyn Adele McKeithen of Jackson, Mississippi 3 September 1957. They have three children, Teresa Carolyn, David William, and Jonathan Carl, one granddaughter, Maria, and three grandsons, Logan, Joseph and Ian. Carolyn died in 2009.

== Education ==
Looney graduated from Emory and Henry College, Emory, Virginia, and the Candler School of Theology of Emory University, Atlanta, Georgia; with additional study in the University of Edinburgh, Scotland, and Union Theological Seminary, Richmond, Virginia.

== Ordained ministry ==
Looney was ordained deacon in 1955 and elder in 1959 by Bishop Roy H. Short. A member of the Holston Annual Conference of the Methodist Church, Rev. Looney served the following appointments: Rising Fawn Circuit, Rising Fawn, Georgia; Baker's Chapel - Wyndale, Abingdon, Virginia; and Pleasant View (formerly Baker's Chapel), Abingdon. In Tennessee he served these appointments: White Oak, Chattanooga; Broad Street, Cleveland; Superintendent of the Chattanooga District; Munsey Memorial, Johnson City; and Church Street, Knoxville.

Looney also shared in Pulpit Exchanges in England and Australia, and work missions in Peru, Liberia, and Sierra Leone.

== Episcopal ministry ==
Looney was elected bishop by the Southeastern Jurisdictional Conference, July 1988, and assigned as the first bishop of the newly created South Georgia Episcopal Area (the South Georgia Annual Conference).

General Church responsibilities have included service on the U.M. General Council on Finance and Administration, the General Board of Church and Society, and the General Council on Ministry. In retirement, Looney served as the president of the Foundation for Evangelism, Lake Junaluska, North Carolina and the episcopal director of the foundation.

Looney served as the pastor of Telford United Methodist Church in Telford, Tennessee, from 2009–13, and in January 2013 began filling the role of pastor of Munsey Memorial United Methodist Church in Johnson City, Tennessee.

== Legacy ==
Bishop Looney established the Carl and Ruth Looney Scholarship for South Georgia clergy.

== See also ==
- List of bishops of the United Methodist Church
