= Goizueta Business School =

Unit of Emory University in Atlanta, Georgia, US

- Type: Private
- Established: 1919; 107 years ago
- Parent institution: Emory University
- Affiliations: The Washington Campus Consortium for Graduate Study in Management
- Dean: Saby Mitra
- Location: Atlanta, GA, United States; 33°47.4′N 84°19.28′W
- Website: goizueta.emory.edu

Emory University's Goizueta Business School (also known as Goizueta Business School, Emory Business School, or simply Goizueta – pronounced goy-swet-ah) is a private business school of Emory University located in Atlanta, Georgia, United States. It is named after Roberto C. Goizueta, former chairman and CEO of The Coca-Cola Company.

The school is accredited by the Association to Advance Collegiate Schools of Business. Goizueta has over 23,000 alumni worldwide in 104 countries.

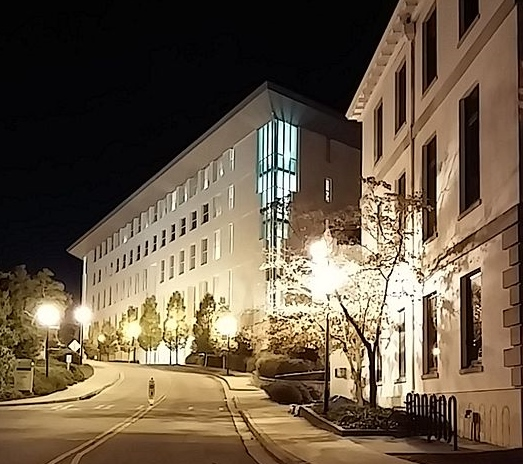
Goizueta Business School, Emory University

== History ==
On February 18, 1919, the dean of Emory College, Howard Odum, recommended the creation of a "school of economics and business administration" to the Board of Trustees. Thus, in the fall of 1919, the new school worked with Emory College to offer courses in economics, accounting, and business law. By 1925, there was one faculty member and full-time assistant, five staff members and 145 students. In 1926, eight students received the Bachelor of Business Administration degree. Two decades after the school awarded degrees in business administration, the school accepted its first female student in 1954. In the same year, the MBA program commenced, with 19 registered students.

In 1992, the Evening MBA program was introduced. When the American Association of Collegiate Schools of Business began accrediting master’s programs, Emory’s program was one of the first to be approved. This newfound position accompanied new programs, such as the concentration within the MBA program for professional accounting and, in 1979, the Executive MBA program. Also at this time, the school created a plan to allow students to complete both the MBA and Juris Doctor degree within four years.

In 1994, the school was renamed for Roberto C. Goizueta, the CEO of The Coca-Cola Company. The millennium brought about a new PhD program in business administration and a new program in Real Estate. The school announced Karen Sedatole as interim dean in 2020.

== Programs ==
=== Undergraduate ===
The Goizueta Business School offers a Bachelor of Business Administration. Students are able to pursue five area depths for their degree which are Finance, Information Systems Operations Management, Accounting, Organization and Management, and Marketing. Goizueta's BBA program carries a STEM designation from the United States Department of Homeland Security.

=== Graduate ===
Goizueta offers several graduate programs which include a two-year MBA, one-year MBA, evening MBA, executive MBA, Master in Business for Veterans, Master of Analytical Finance, Master in Management, and an MS in Business Analytics.

=== Executive Education ===
Goizueta offers professional development courses and certificates for individuals and custom programs for organizations.

=== PhD ===
Goizueta offers a PhD in Business.

== Academics ==
Business school rankings

U.S. MBA Rankings
- Bloomberg (2025): 16
- U.S. News & World Report (2026): 23

Global MBA Rankings
- QS (2026): 48
- FT (2026): 36

Goizueta's MBA is ranked 17th in the nation on U.S. News & World Report and 16th in the nation on Bloomberg Businessweek for the 2023-2024 editions. Additionally, LinkedIn's inaugural MBA rankings placed Goizueta 15th in the United States. Fortune also ranked the Goizueta MBA 17th nationally for its 2025 ranking. The program excelled in specific categories within Bloomberg Businessweek's ranking, placing 8th in both the Networking and Learning categories. According to the Financial Times, Goizueta's MBA program is globally ranked 36th, while its alumni network holds the 19th position in the rankings.

Goizueta's executive MBA program is ranked 11th in the US and 43rd globally according to Financial Times's 2023 rankings.

Goizueta's Masters in Business Analytics is ranked 18th in the US and 42nd globally according to the QS Business Masters Rankings.

Goizueta's BBA program is ranked 13th in the US according to U.S. News & World Report's 2023-2024 undergraduate business rankings.

== Facilities ==
=== Main campus ===
Goizueta is located on the main campus of Emory University, located in the Druid Hills section of unincorporated DeKalb County, Georgia, a suburban community near Atlanta. Also located on the main campus are Emory College of Arts and Sciences and all graduate and professional schools, including the Law and Medical schools. Other key buildings on campus include the Emory Student Center (ESC), the Woodruff PE Center (WOODPEC), and the Woodruff Library, which contains the Goizueta Business Library.

The Main campus is about a 15-minute drive from downtown and midtown Atlanta as well as the Buckhead area.

The building at the corner of Fishburne Drive and Clifton Road was dedicated in October 1997. A significant part of the funding was made possible by the Woodruff Foundation and Emory Board of Trustees Chair Bradley Currey.

=== Goizueta Foundation Center ===
Completed in 2005, the 90,000 square foot Goizueta Foundation Center for Research and Doctoral Education houses areas for PhD students, Executive MBA classrooms, the MBA Career Management Center, and conference and breakout rooms. The Balser Art Collection, a collection of art including original works by Andy Warhol, Pablo Picasso and Salvador Dalí, is located throughout the center.

== Notable faculty ==
- Benn Konsynski – George S. Craft Distinguished University Professor of Information Systems & Operations Management
- Jagdish Sheth – Charles H. Kellstadt Professor of Marketing

== Notable alumni ==
- John Chidsey - CEO of Burger King
- Brian Gallagher - President and CEO of the United Way of America
- Michael Golden - Vice Chairman of The New York Times Company
- Lado Gurgenidze - Prime Minister of Georgia
- Tim Kelly - Mayor of Chattanooga, Tennessee
- Alan J. Lacy - Former Chairman and CEO of Sears, Roebuck and Company
- Jim Lanzone - CEO of CBS Interactive
- Duncan Niederauer - CEO of NYSE Euronext
- Michael J. Petrucelli - Founder and Executive Chairman, Clearpath, Inc.
- A.J. Steigman - Founder and CEO of Steignet

== See also ==
- Emory Center for Alternative Investments
- Emory Marketing Institute
- List of United States business school rankings
- List of business schools in the United States
