= James W. Wagner =

Former president of Emory University

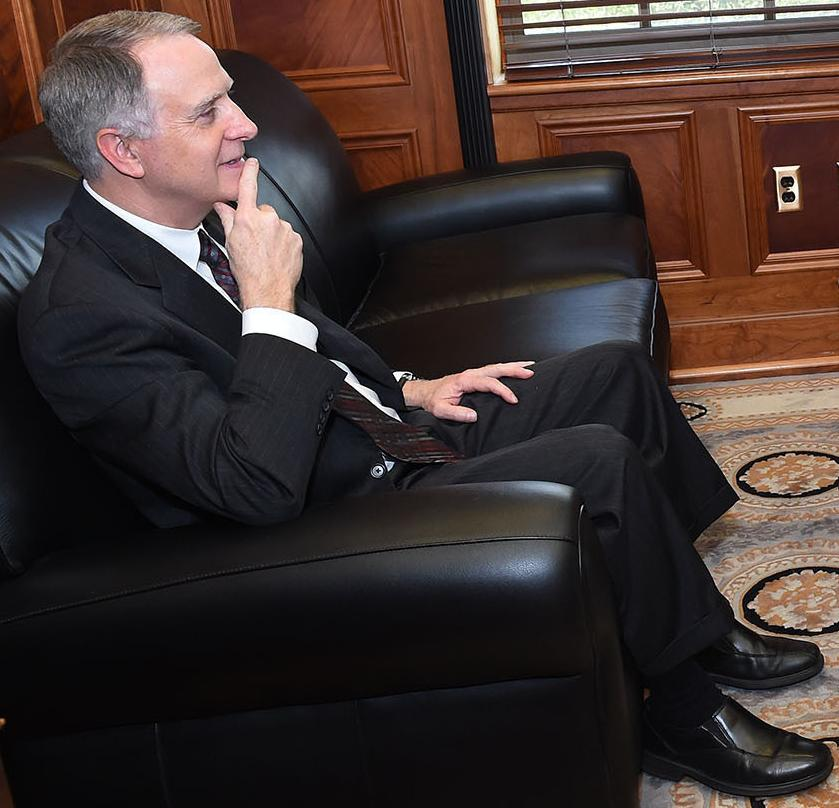

19th President of Emory University
- In office September 1, 2003 – September 1, 2016
- Preceded by: William Chace
- Succeeded by: Claire E. Sterk

Personal details
- Born: 1953 (age 72–73) Silver Spring, Maryland, U.S.
- Education: University of Delaware (BS); Johns Hopkins University (MS, PhD)
- Profession: Engineer

James W. Wagner (born 1953) is an American materials engineer. He served as the 19th president of Emory University in Georgia from 2003 to 2016 and as provost of Case Western Reserve University in Ohio from 2000 to 2003.

== Biography ==
James W. Wagner was born in Silver Spring, Maryland in 1953. He received a B.S. in electrical engineering from the University of Delaware in 1975 and an M.S. in clinical engineering in 1978 from the Johns Hopkins University School of Medicine. In 1984, he received a PhD from Johns Hopkins in materials science and engineering.

He started his career as a professor at Johns Hopkins University. He also worked at the United States Food and Drug Administration. From 1998 to 2000, he served as a dean at Case Western Reserve University. He served as the provost from 2000 to 2003 and as the interim president from 2001 to 2002. According to The New York Times, Wagner received $1,040,420 in total compensation at Emory in 2008.

In 2009, he became a fellow at the American Academy of Arts & Sciences. He also serves on the boards of The Carter Center, the Georgia Research Alliance, SunTrust Banks, the Metro Atlanta Chamber of Commerce, the Atlanta Regional Council for Higher Education, and the Woodruff Arts Center.

He is a Presbyterian.

== Controversy ==
In February 2013, Emory University president Wagner wrote an essay in the Emory Magazine entitled "As American as... Compromise" in which he used the Three-Fifths Compromise as an example of pragmatic compromise that Emory University should emulate. He wrote, "One instance of constitutional compromise was the agreement to count three-fifths of the slave population for purposes of state representation in Congress... Both sides found a way to temper ideology and continue working toward the highest aspiration they both shared—the aspiration to form a more perfect union. They set their sights higher, not lower, in order to identify their common goal and keep moving toward it." The essay sparked controversy on Emory's campus and attracted national and international media attention and an apology from Wagner. Per the New York Times, Wagner "acknowledged both the nation’s continuing education in race relations and his own." Leslie Harris, an Emory history professor who has worked to address issues of race at the college, countered that “[t]he three-fifths compromise is one of the greatest failed compromises in U.S. history .... Its goal was to keep the union together, but the Civil War broke out anyway.”
