= Roy Hunter Short =

American historian

Roy Hunter Short (19 October 1902 – 2 July 1994) was an American bishop of The Methodist Church and the United Methodist Church, elected in 1948.

== Birth and family ==
Roy was born in Louisville, Kentucky, the son of Jesse Peters and Minnie L. (Badders) Short. Roy married Louise Clay Baird of Jeffersonville, Indiana 1 September 1926. They had three sons: Hunter Baird, Murray Malcolm, and Riley Phillips.

== Education ==
Among his eight earned academic degrees, Roy graduated from the University of Louisville in 1924 with an A.B. degree. He completed both a B.D. (1927) and a Th.M. (1929) from the Louisville Presbyterian Theological Seminary. He also earned a Doctorate from Emory University.

Roy was a member of Theta Phi honorary fraternity. He was also honored with the D.D. degree by Kentucky Wesleyan College in 1939.

== Ordained ministry ==
Rev. Short was ordained in 1921 and received into the Louisville Annual Conference of the Methodist Episcopal Church, South. He pastored the following appointments: Jefferson Circuit (1921–22), Mt. Holly, Mill Creek (1922–26), Oakdale Church, Louisville (1926–28), Marcus Lindsey Church, Louisville (1928–30), Greenville (1930–36). He was the Superintendent of the Elizabethtown District (1935–37) and of the Louisville District (1937–41). He was appointed to the St. Paul Church in Louisville (1941–44), then became the Editor of The Upper Room in 1944.

He was elected a delegate to the General Conference of the M.E. Church, South in 1938, the Uniting Conference of The Methodist Church in 1939, and of Jurisdictional and General Conferences of The Methodist Church, 1940–48. He also was a member of the General Commission on Evangelism (1938–40), and the Secretary of the Louisville Conference since 1931. He was also involved in the development of the new Book of Discipline for The Methodist Church.

Rev. Short also was a member of Kiwanis International.

== Episcopal ministry ==
Dr. Short was elected a Bishop by the Southeastern Jurisdictional Conference of The Methodist Church, June 1948. His first assignment was as the Resident Bishop of the Jacksonville Episcopal Area. From 1952 until 1964 he was assigned to the Nashville, Tennessee Area, and from 1964 to 1972 to the Louisville Area. At the request of the Council of Bishops of the United Methodist Church, Bishop Short provided episcopal supervision to the Philippines Central Conference in the interim between episcopal elections (1972–74). Bishop Short has also traveled extensively, including trips to Latin America, Africa, Fiji, Australia, Korea, Hong Kong, and Europe.

Bishop Short has also served in many administrative capacities: President of the College of Bishops of the Southeastern Jurisdiction (1956–64), Secretary of the Council of Bishops of the Methodist Church (1956–68), Chairman of the Joint Committee on Christian Education in Foreign Fields (1956–64), and Chairman of the Methodist Interboard Commission on the Local Church (1956–64).

In retirement, Bishop and Mrs. Short resided in Hermitage, Tennessee.

== Selected writings ==
- Your Church and You (a membership manual for Methodist boys and girls), 1943.
- lessons in Adult Student, 1939–40.
- Evangelistic Preaching, 1956.
- Evangelism Through the Local Church, 1956.
- My Great Redeemer's Praise, 1957.
- One Witness in One World, (the study book for the 1964–68 quadrennium).
- United Methodism in Theory and Practice, 1974.
- Chosen To Be Consecrated: The Bishops of the Methodist Church, 1784–1968, 1976.
- The History of the Council of Bishops, 1939–1979, 1984.
- The Leadership Role of the Council of Bishops, 1984.
- Methodism in Kentucky.

== Biographies ==
- Hunt, Earl Gladstone Jr, Aspects of our Methodist heritage: With particular focus upon one of its distinguished transmitters, Bishop Roy Hunter Short, 1972.

== See also ==
- List of bishops of the United Methodist Church
