= Isaac Hopkins =

Isaac Hopkins may refer to:

- Isaac Hopkins (cricketer) (1870–1913), Australian cricketer
- Isaac S. Hopkins (1841–1914), professor and president of the Georgia Institute of Technology
