= Universal bank =

Type of bank

A universal bank is a type of bank which participates in many kinds of banking activities and is both a commercial bank and an investment bank as well as providing other financial services such as insurance. These are also called full-service financial firms, although there can also be full-service investment banks which provide wealth and asset management, trading, underwriting, researching as well as financial advisory.

The concept is most relevant in the United Kingdom and the United States, where historically there was a distinction drawn between pure investment banks and commercial banks. In the US, this was a result of the Glass–Steagall Act of 1933. In both countries, however, since the 1980s the regulatory barrier to the combination of investment banks and commercial banks has largely been removed, and a number of universal banks have emerged in both jurisdictions.

In other countries, the concept is less relevant as there was no regulatory distinction between investment banks and commercial banks. Thus, banks of a very large size tend to operate as universal banks, while smaller firms specialised as commercial banks or as investment banks. This is especially true of countries with a European Continental banking tradition.

Universal banking and private banking often coexist, but can exist independently. The provision of many services by universal banks can lead to long-term relationships between universal banks and their customers.

== History ==
Following the 1907 financial crisis, the U.S. Monetary Commission wanted to understand the major financial systems of the world. A treatise by Jakob Riesser, the director of a Berlin bank, argued that the German universal banking system possessed beneficial characteristics that allowed it to efficiently provide inexpensive capital to industry and promote growth. Alexander Gerschenkron also advanced the hypothesis that universal banking was critical to Germany's industrialization. In 2007, Emory University economist Caroline Fohlin has questioned the validity of the Gerschenkron hypothesis.

== Examples ==
Notable examples of universal banks include Bank of America, Citigroup, JPMorgan Chase, and Wells Fargo of the United States; UBS and Credit Suisse of Switzerland; BNP Paribas, Crédit Agricole and Société Générale of France; Barclays, HSBC, Lloyds Banking Group, NatWest Group and Standard Chartered of the United Kingdom; Deutsche Bank of Germany; ING Bank of the Netherlands; RBC of Canada; Standard Bank Group of South Africa.

Examples of pure investment banks generally do not exist except in America, and include the Bank of New York Mellon, Goldman Sachs, and Morgan Stanley.
