= Global Universities for Societal Impact =

- Formation: 2023
- Type: Education and research
- Region served: Germany; Israel; Japan; United Kingdom; United States
- Members: 5

The Global Universities for Societal Impact (GUSI) is an international consortium of five leading universities from Germany, Israel, Japan, the United Kingdom and the United States. Established in 2023, the network focuses on facilitating multilateral collaboration in education, research, leadership and innovation.

The network aims to add value to each member's institutional strategy for global engagement, enhance academic mobility between staff and students, and create a funding programme for researchers to work together on joint projects. In addition, member universities participate in doctoral training and workshops together.

== Member institutions ==
Institution	Country
University of Bonn	Germany
Emory University	United States
Hebrew University of Jerusalem	Israel
University of St Andrews	United Kingdom
Waseda University	Japan

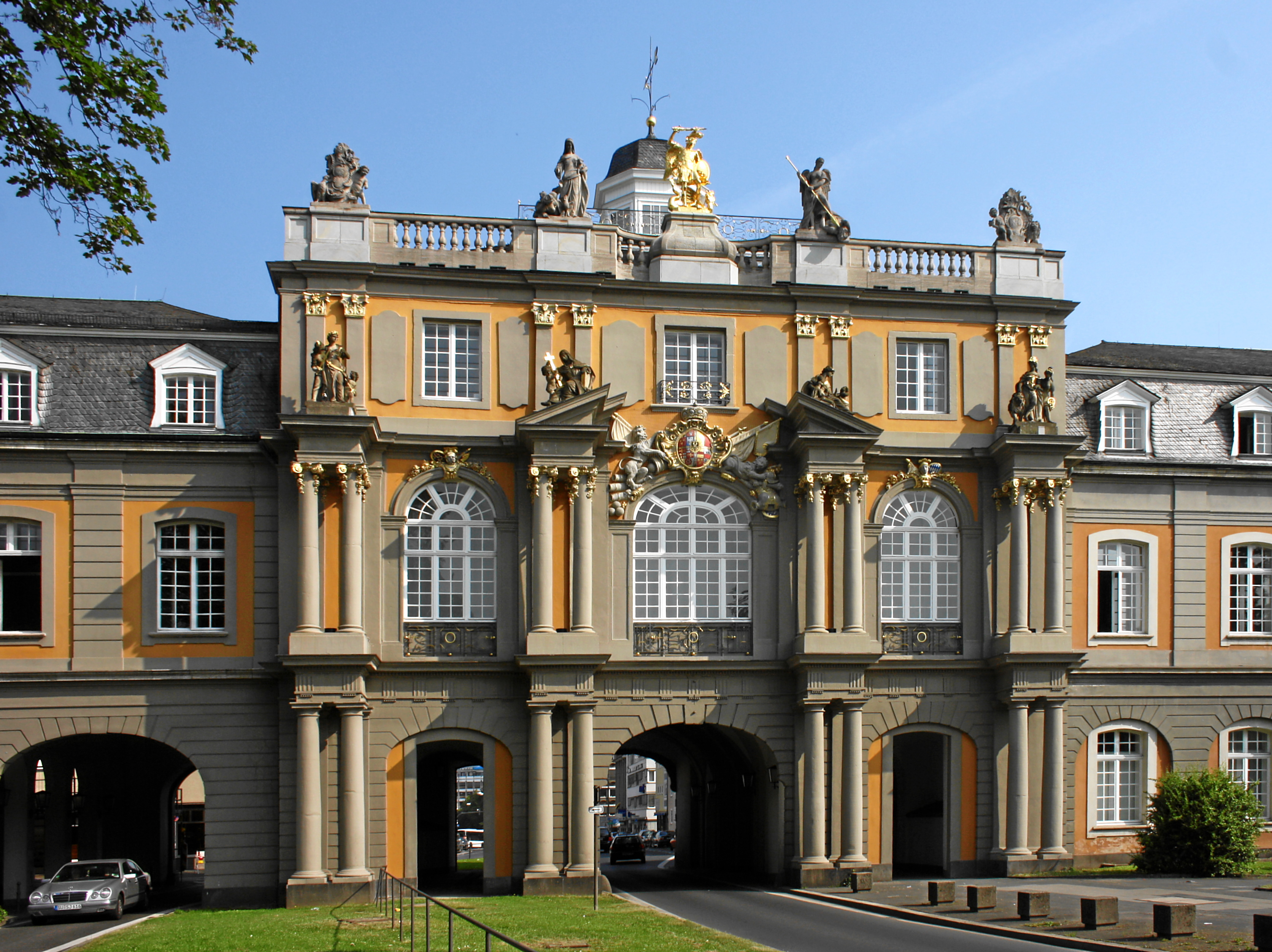
University of Bonn

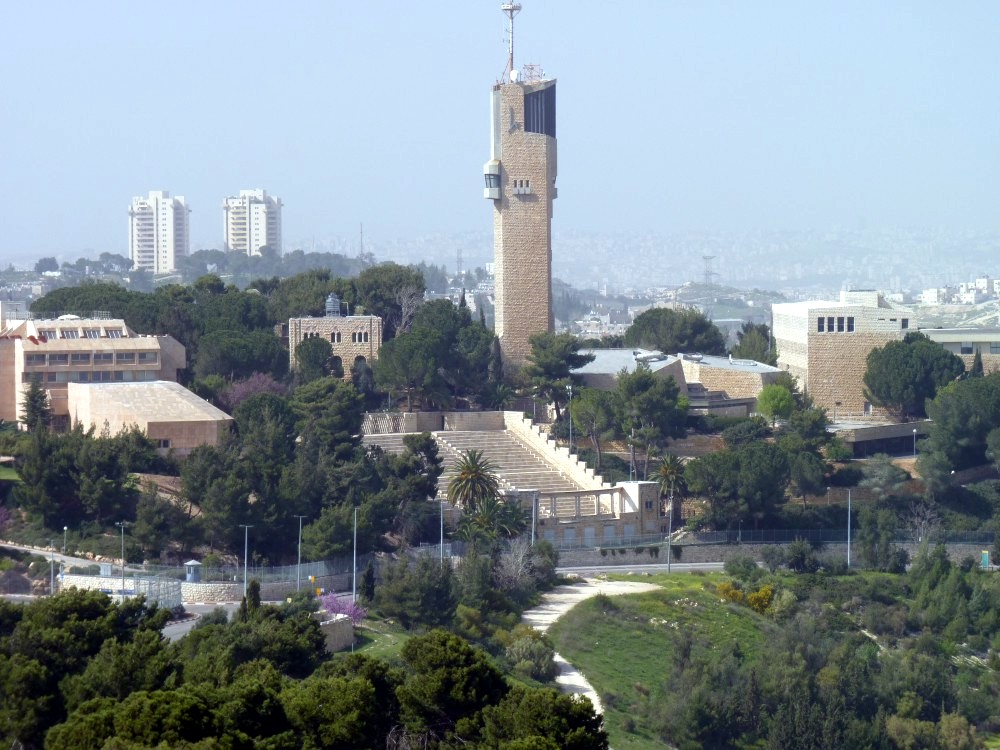
Hebrew University of Jerusalem

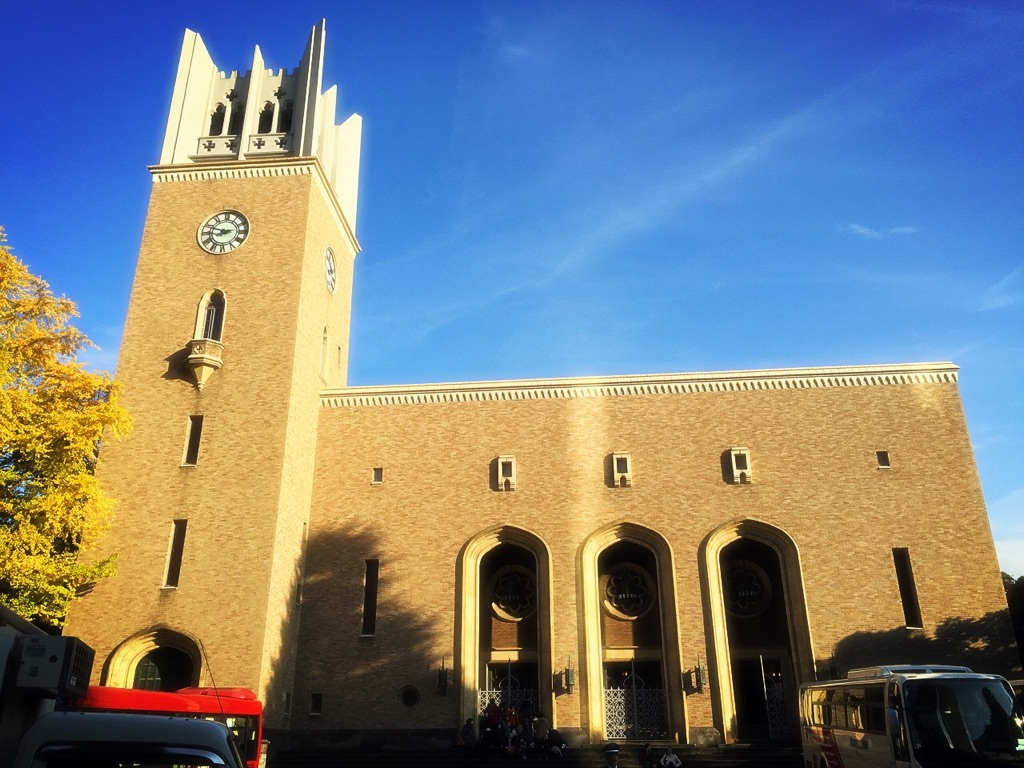
Waseda University

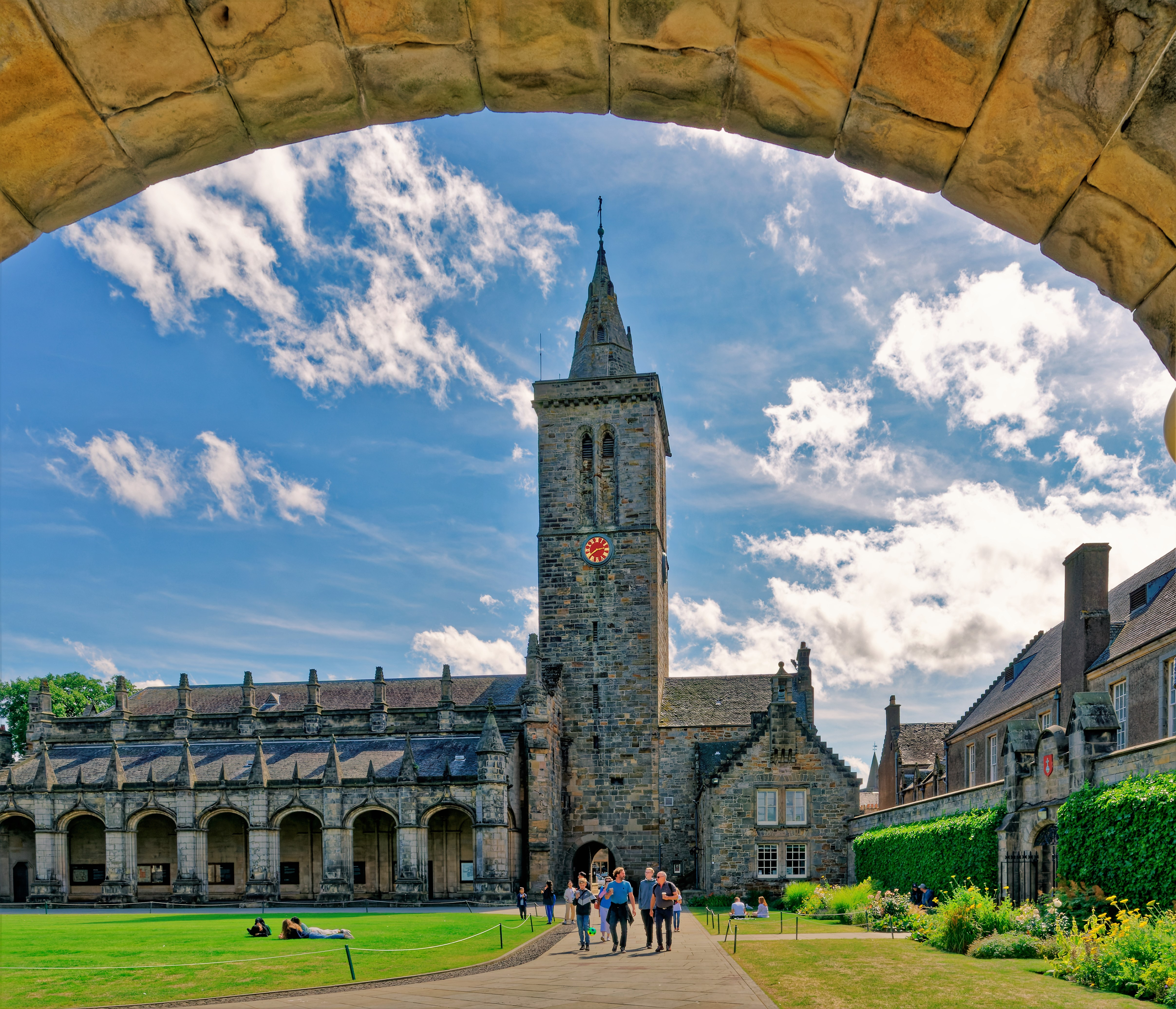
University of St Andrews

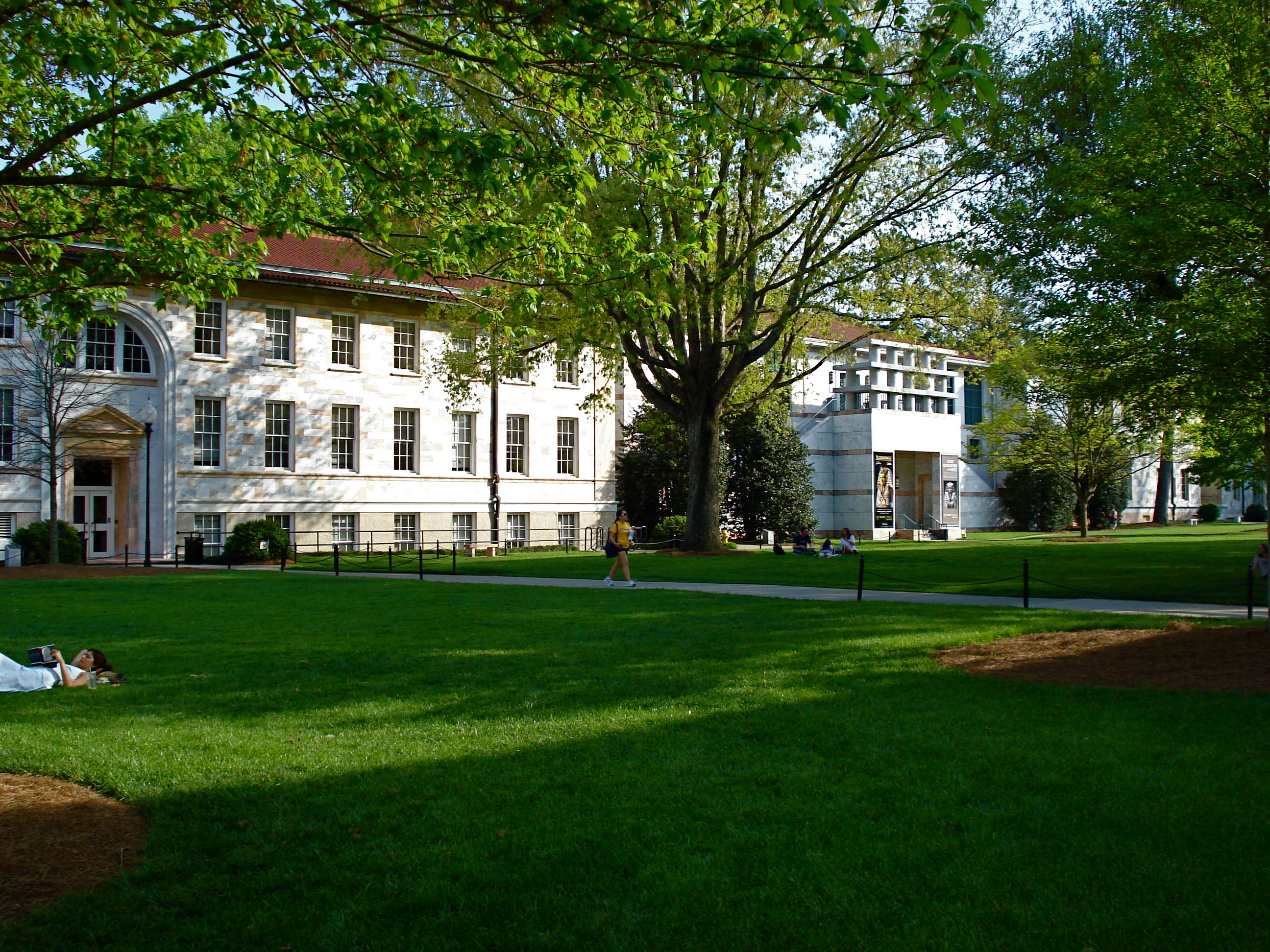
Emory University

== See also ==
- List of higher education associations and alliances
