= List of National Debate Tournament winners =

The National Debate Tournament is an American inter-college debate competition, held annually since 1947. The Rex Copeland award, inaugurated in 1989 for the team with the best performance over the whole season, is presented on the same occasion.

== National Debate Tournament champions ==
Wake Forest University maintains a list of champions, runners-up, and semi-finalists.

Year	National Champions	School
1947	Scott Nobles & Gerald Sanders	Southeastern State College
1948	Keith Parks & David Cotton	North Texas State College (University of North Texas)
1949	Oscar Newton & Mitchell Latoff	University of Alabama
1950	Richard O'Connell & Thomas Hayes	University of Vermont
1951	James Q. Wilson & Holt Spicer	University of Redlands
1952	James Q. Wilson & Holt Spicer	University of Redlands
1953	Gerald Kogan & Lawrence Perlmutter	University of Miami
1954	William Amold & Hubert Bell	University of Kansas
1955	Dennis Holt & Elis Storey	University of Alabama
1956	George Walker & James Murphy	United States Military Academy
1957	Norman Lefstein & Phillip Hubbart	Augustana College
1958	William Welsh & Richard Kirshberg	Northwestern University
1959	William Welsh & Richard Kirshberg	Northwestern University
1960	Anthony Roisman & Saul Baernstein	Dartmouth College
1961	Laurence Tribe & Gene Clements	Harvard University
1962	Dale Williams & Sarah Benson	Ohio State University
1963	Fank Wohl & Stephen Kessler	Dartmouth College
1964	Raoul Kennedy & Douglas Pipes	University of the Pacific
1965	John Wittig & Barnett Pearce	Carson-Newman College
1966	Bill Snyder & Mike Denger	Northwestern University
1967	Tom Brewer & John Isaacson	Dartmouth College
1968	Robert Shields & Lee Thompson	Wichita State University
1969	Richard Lewis & Joel Perwin	Harvard University
1970	Robert McCulloh & David Jeans	University of Kansas
1971	Don Hornstein & Barrett McInerney	University of California, Los Angeles
1972	Mike Clough & Mike Fernandez	University of California, Santa Barbara
1973	Elliot Mincberg & Ron Marmer	Northwestern University
1974	Charles Garvin & Greg Rosenbaum	Harvard University
1975	Jay Hurst & David Kent	Baylor University
1976	Robin Rowland & Frank Cross	University of Kansas
1977	John Walker & David Ottoson	Georgetown University
1978	Mark Cotham & Stuart H. Singer	Northwestern University
1979	Michael King & John Bredehoft	Harvard University
1980	Don Dripps & Tom Fulkerson	Northwestern University
1981	Michael Alberty & Stephen Marzen	University of Pittsburgh
1982	Dave Sutherland & Dan Sutherland	University of Louisville
1983	Mark Gidley & Rodger Payne	University of Kansas
1984	Leonard Gail & Mark Koulogeorge	Dartmouth College
1985	Jonathan Massey & Ed Swaine	Harvard University
1986	David Brownell & Ouita Papka	University of Kentucky
1987	Griffin Vincent & Lyn Robbins	Baylor University
1988	Shaun Martin & Robert D. Wick	Dartmouth College
1989	Martin Loeber & Daniel Plants	Baylor University
1990	David Coale & Alex Lennon	Harvard University
1991	Roger Cole and Marc Rubinstein	University of Redlands
1992	Ahilan Arulanantham & Kevin Kuswa	Georgetown University
1993	Ara Lovitt & Steven Sklaver	Dartmouth College
1994	Sean McCaffity & Jody Terry	Northwestern University
1995	Sean McCaffity & Jody Terry	Northwestern University
1996	Kate Shuster & David Heidt	Emory University
1997	Daveed Gartenstein-Ross & Brian Prestes	Wake Forest University
1998	Michael Gottlieb & Ryan Sparacino	Northwestern University
1999	Michael Gottlieb & Ryan Sparacino	Northwestern University
2000	Michael Horowitz & Jon Paul Lupo	Emory University
2001	Andy Peterson & Andy Ryan	University of Iowa
2002	Jake Foster & Jonathan Paul	Northwestern University
2003	Geoff Garen & Tristan Morales	Northwestern University
2004	Greta Stahl & Dave Strauss	Michigan State University
2005	Tristan Morales & Josh Branson	Northwestern University
2006	Ryan Burke & Casey Harrigan	Michigan State University
2007	Aimi Hamraie & Julie Hoehn	Emory University
2008	Seth Gannon & Alex Lamballe	Wake Forest University
2009	Brett Bricker & Nate Johnson	University of Kansas
2010	Carly Wunderlich & Eric Lanning	Michigan State University
2011	Matt Fisher & Stephanie Spies	Northwestern University
2012	Andrew Arsht & Andrew Markoff	Georgetown University
2013	Elijah Smith & Ryan Wash	Emporia State University
2014	Andrew Arsht & Andrew Markoff	Georgetown University
2015	Alex Miles & Arjun Vellayappan	Northwestern University
2016	David Herman & Hemanth Sanjeev	Harvard University
2017	Devane Murphy & Nicole Nave	Rutgers University-Newark
2018	Quaram Robinson & Will Katz	University of Kansas
2019	Dan Bannister & Anthony Trufanov	University of Kentucky
2020	Not held due to the COVID-19 pandemic	N/A
2021	Raam Tambe & Tyler Vergho	Dartmouth College
2022	Arvind Shankar & Tyler Vergho	Dartmouth College
2023	Tajaih Robinson & Iyana Trotman	Wake Forest University
2024	Kelly Phil & Bennett Dombcik	University of Michigan
2025	Eli T. Louis & Jeremiah Cohn	Binghamton University
2026	Daniel Gallagher & Ike Song	Emory University

== Tournament victories by school ==
School	Tourn. Won	Years
Northwestern University	15	1958, 1959, 1966, 1973, 1978, 1980, 1994, 1995, 1998, 1999, 2002, 2003, 2005, 2011, 2015
Dartmouth College	8	1960, 1963, 1967, 1984, 1988, 1993, 2021, 2022
Harvard University	7	1961, 1969, 1974, 1979, 1985, 1990, 2016
University of Kansas	6	1954, 1970, 1976, 1983, 2009, 2018
Georgetown University	4	1977, 1992, 2012, 2014
Baylor University	3	1975, 1987, 1989
Emory University	4	1996, 2000, 2007, 2026
Michigan State University	3	2004, 2006, 2010
University of Redlands	3	1951, 1952, 1991
Wake Forest University	3	1997, 2008, 2023
University of Alabama	2	1949, 1955
University of Kentucky	2	1986, 2019
Augustana College (Illinois)	1	1957
Carson-Newman College	1	1965
University of California at Los Angeles	1	1971
University of California at Santa Barbara	1	1972
Emporia State University	1	2013
University of Iowa	1	2001
University of Louisville	1	1982
University of Miami	1	1953
University of Michigan	1	2024
North Texas State College	1	1948
Ohio State University	1	1962
University of the Pacific	1	1964
University of Pittsburgh	1	1981
Rutgers University-Newark	1	2017
Southeastern State College	1	1947
United States Military Academy	1	1956
University of Vermont	1	1950
Wichita State University	1	1968
Binghamton University	1	2025

== Rex Copeland Award ==
The Rex Copeland award, presented on the eve of the NDT, goes to the team with the best season-long performance, ranked #1 among the 16 teams with automatic bids to the tournament. Rex Copeland, a debater at Samford University, was murdered by his debate coach, William Slagle, in 1989.

Wake Forest University maintains a list of the top 5 finishers for the Copeland Award.

Academic Year	Copeland Award Winner	School
TOP FIRST ROUND TEAMS - (Prior to establishing the Copeland Award)
1972–1973	Stewart Jay & Bradley Ziff	Georgetown University
1973–1974	Charles Garvin & Greg Rosenbaum	Harvard University
1974–1975	Thomas Rollins & Bradley Ziff	Georgetown University
1975–1976	Robert Feldhake & Richard Godfrey	Augustana College
1976–1977	David Ottoson & John Walker	Georgetown University
1977–1978	David Ottoson & Tom Rollins	Georgetown University
1978–1979	Chris Wonnell & Susan Winkler	Northwestern University
1979–1980	James Kirkland & John Thompson	Georgetown University
1980–1981	Cy Smith & Mark Weinhardt	Dartmouth College
1981–1982	Mark Gidley & Zac Grant	University of Kansas
1982–1983	Melanie Gardner & Erik Walker	Samford University
1983–1984	Leonard Gail & Mark Koulogeorge	Dartmouth College
1984–1985	David Bloom & Greg Mastel	Claremont McKenna College
1985–1986	Dan Povinelli & Mark Friedman	University of Massachusetts Amherst
1986–1987	Griffin Vincent & Lyn Robbins	Baylor University
1987–1988	Ben Attias & Gordon Mitchell	Northwestern University
1988–1989	Martin Loeber & Daniel Plants	Baylor University
Copeland Award Winner
1989–1990	David Coale & Alex Lennon	Harvard University
1990–1991	Roger Cole and Marc Rubinstein	University of Redlands
1991–1992	Kenny Agran & Ara Lovitt	Dartmouth College
1992–1993	Ara Lovitt & Steven Sklaver	Dartmouth College
1993–1994	Paul Skiermont & Jason Patil	University of Kentucky
1994–1995	John Hughes & Adrienne Brovero	Wake Forest University
1995–1996	Sean McCaffity and Mason Miller	Northwestern University
1996–1997	Scott Hessell and Corey Stoughton	University of Michigan
1997–1998	George Kouros and Anjan Sahni	Emory University
1998–1999	Michael Gottlieb & Ryan Sparacino	Northwestern University
1999–2000	Kristen Langwell & Andy Ryan	University of Iowa
2000–2001	Randy Luskey & Dan Shalmon	University of California, Berkeley
2001–2002	Alex Berger & Ben Thorpe	Dartmouth College
2002–2003	Geoff Garen & Tristan Morales	Northwestern University
2003–2004	Dan Shalmon & Tejinder Singh	University of California, Berkeley
2004–2005	Tristan Morales & Josh Branson	Northwestern University
2005–2006	Michael Klinger & Nikhil Mirchandani	Harvard University
2006–2007	Brent Culpepper & Kevin Rabinowitz	University of Georgia
2007–2008	Jacob Polin & Michael Burshteyn	University of California, Berkeley
2008–2009	Matt Fisher & John Warden	Northwestern University
2009–2010	Stephen Weil & Ovais Inamullah	Emory University
2010–2011	Stephen Weil & Ovais Inamullah	Emory University
2011–2012	Ryan Beiermeister & Layne Kirshon	Northwestern University
2012–2013	Andrew Arsht & Andrew Markoff	Georgetown University
2013–2014	Alex Miles & Arjun Vellayappan	Northwestern University
2014–2015	Alex Miles & Arjun Vellayappan	Northwestern University
2015–2016	David Herman & Hemanth Sanjeev	Harvard University
2016–2017	Ayush Midha & Hemanth Sanjeev	Harvard University
2017–2018	Will Katz & Quaram Robinson	University of Kansas
2018–2019	Dan Bannister & Anthony Trufanov	University of Kentucky
2019—2020	Nathan Fleming & Miles Gray	University of California, Berkeley
2020—2021	Raam Tambe & Tyler Vergho	Dartmouth College
2021—2022	Rafael Pierry & Giorgio Rabbini	University of Michigan
2022—2023	Rafael Pierry & Kelly Phil	University of Michigan
2023—2024	Grace Kessler & Shreyas Rajagopal	Emory University
2024—2025	John Marshall & Graham Revare	University of Kansas
2025—2026	Daniel Gallagher & Ike Song	Emory University
