= Isaac S. Hopkins =

American academic (1841–1914)

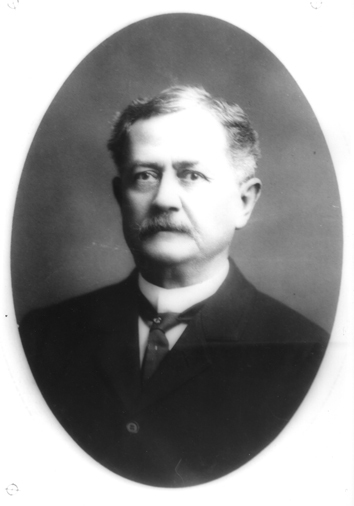
- Born: June 20, 1841; Augusta, Georgia
- Died: February 3, 1914 (aged 72); Atlanta, Georgia
- Education: Emory College; Georgia Medical College
- Known for: First President of Georgia Institute of Technology

Isaac Stiles Hopkins (June 20, 1841 – February 3, 1914) was a professor and the first President of the Georgia Institute of Technology (1888–1896) as well as pastor of the First Methodist Church in Atlanta, Georgia.

== Biography ==
Hopkins was born in Augusta, Georgia. He graduated from Emory College in 1859, and from Georgia Medical College in 1861. He returned to Emory to teach natural science, and then physics at Birmingham–Southern College (then known as Southern University), before returning to Emory and becoming vice president in 1882 and president in 1885.

Hopkins' interest in technological development led him to be chosen as the president of the Georgia Institute of Technology, then called the Georgia School of Technology, in 1888. He was the first chair of the physics department where he also concurrently served as a professor in the School of Physics, and as a pastor of the First United Methodist Church. Hopkins resigned from Georgia Tech in 1896 to serve the church full-time.

He died at his home in Atlanta on February 3, 1914.

== Legacy ==
One of the two pillars comprising the Haygood-Hopkins Memorial Gateway, informally known as Emory University's "front door," is named for Hopkins. The pillar's inscription says of Hopkins, "A pioneer in technical education, he was one of the builders of the New South." It was dedicated in 1937. Hopkins' descendants still live in and around the Atlanta area, including former state representative Lelia Pittman Crowe, the great, grand-daughter of Hopkins, and divorce attorney, Charles Crowe, the great, great, great grandson of Hopkins.
