= Caroline Fohlin =

Economics professor

- Education: Tufts University; University of California, Berkeley
- Occupation: Professor
- Years active: 1994 – present

Caroline Fohlin is an economics professor at Emory University who specializes in corporate finance, venture capital, economic history, and financial market structures.

== Education ==
Fohlin graduated from Tufts University with a bachelor's degree in mathematics and quantitative economics in 1988. She earned a PhD in economics from the University of California, Berkeley in 1994.

== Career ==
Fohlin served on the California Institute of Technology faculty from 1994 to 2004. In 2005, she took a position at Johns Hopkins University. She joined the Emory University faculty in 2012. She currently serves as an editor of Financial History Review.

== 2024 protest arrest ==
In April 2024, Fohlin was arrested at an Emory University protest against the treatment of Palestinians during the Gaza war. Fohlin approached a student being forced to the ground as they were arrested, leaning down to the student and yelling at the police to "get away" from them. A police officer then flipped Fohlin onto the ground arresting her as well. Fohlin was charged with battery and disorderly conduct. An opinion piece by Lydia Polgreen for The New York Times cited Fohlin's arrest as an example of the "horrifying" use of force against pro-Palestine demonstrations on college campuses. On the April 29 edition of CNN Newsroom, anchor Jim Acosta said he could not "get over" the footage of Fohlin's arrest and criticized police for their "heavy-handed tactics."

== Personal life ==
Fohlin is married to John Latting, the dean of admissions at Emory University. The couple have three children.

== Published works ==
=== Books ===
- Finance Capitalism and Germany's Rise to Industrial Power (2007), Cambridge: Cambridge University Press. ISBN 0521810205
- Mobilizing Money: How the World's Richest Nations Financed Industrial Growth (2012), Cambridge: Cambridge University Press. ISBN 0521810213

=== Book chapters ===
- "The History of Corporate Ownership and Control in Germany" (2007), in A History of Corporate Governance Around the World, Chicago: University of Chicago Press. ISBN 0226536831
- "A Brief History of Investment Banking from Medieval Times to the Present" (2016), in The Oxford Handbook of Banking and Financial History, Oxford: Oxford University Press. ISBN 0191633216
