= Isaac Hopkins (cricketer) =

Australian cricketer

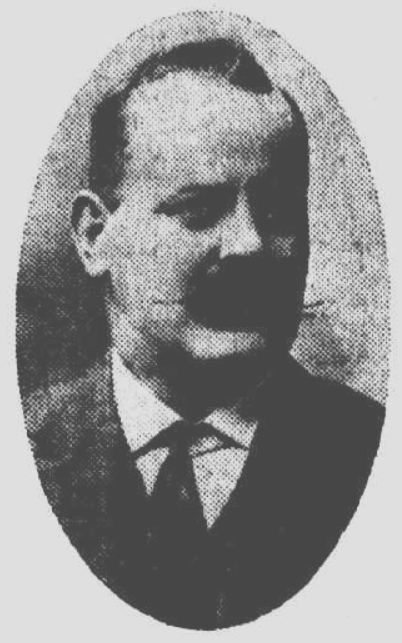

Personal information
- Born: 9 November 1870; Melbourne, Australia
- Died: 25 October 1913 (aged 42); Melbourne, Australia

Domestic team information
- Years: Team
- 1903: Victoria
- Source: Cricinfo, 15 November 2015

Isaac Hopkins (9 November 1870 – 25 October 1913) was an Australian cricketer. He played one first-class cricket match for Victoria in 1903.

== See also ==
- List of Victoria first-class cricketers
