= Emory University =

Private university in Atlanta, Georgia, US

- Former name: Emory College (1836–1915)
- Motto: Cor prudentis possidebit scientiam (Latin)
- Motto in English: "The wise heart seeks knowledge"
- Type: Private research university
- Established: 1836; 190 years ago
- Accreditation: SACS
- Religious affiliation: United Methodist Church
- Academic affiliations: AAU; COFHE; GRA; GUSI; IAMSCU; NAICU; ORAU
- Endowment: $12 billion (2025)
- President: Christopher L. Augostini
- Total staff: 32,594 (2020), includes approx. 24,000 health care employees
- Students: 15,909 (fall 2022)
- Undergraduates: 8,155 (fall 2022)
- Postgraduates: 7,754 (fall 2022)
- Location: Atlanta, Georgia, U.S. 33°47′28″N 84°19′24″W
- Campus: 631 acres (255 ha); Large city
- Other campuses: Oxford; Online
- Newspaper: The Emory Wheel
- Colors: Blue and gold
- Nickname: Eagles
- Sporting affiliations: NCAA Division III – UAA
- Mascots: Swoop the Eagle; Dooley the Skeleton
- Website: emory.edu

Emory University is a private research university in Atlanta, Georgia, United States. It was founded in 1836 as Emory College by the Methodist Episcopal Church and named in honor of Methodist bishop John Emory. Its main campus is in Druid Hills, four miles (six kilometers) from downtown Atlanta.

Emory University comprises nine undergraduate, graduate, and professional schools, including Emory College of Arts and Sciences, Goizueta Business School, Nell Hodgson Woodruff School of Nursing, Oxford College, Emory University School of Medicine, Emory University School of Law, Rollins School of Public Health, Candler School of Theology, and Laney Graduate School. Emory University enrolls nearly 16,000 students from the U.S. and over 100 foreign countries.

Emory Healthcare is the largest healthcare system in the state of Georgia and comprises seven major hospitals, including Emory University Hospital and Emory University Hospital Midtown. The university operates the Winship Cancer Institute, Emory National Primate Research Center, and many disease and vaccine research centers. Emory University is adjacent to the U.S. Centers for Disease Control and Prevention (CDC) and is a long-time partner in global and national prevention and research initiatives. The International Association of National Public Health Institutes is headquartered at the university. Emory University has the 15th-largest endowment among U.S. colleges and universities. The university is classified among "R1: Doctoral Universities – Very high research activity". Emory University was elected to the Association of American Universities in 1995.

Emory faculty and alumni include one vice president of the United States, two prime ministers, two Nobel Peace Prize laureates, and a United States Supreme Court justice. Other notable alumni include twenty-one Rhodes Scholars and six Pulitzer Prize winners. Emory has more than 165,000 alumni.

== History ==
=== Nineteenth century ===
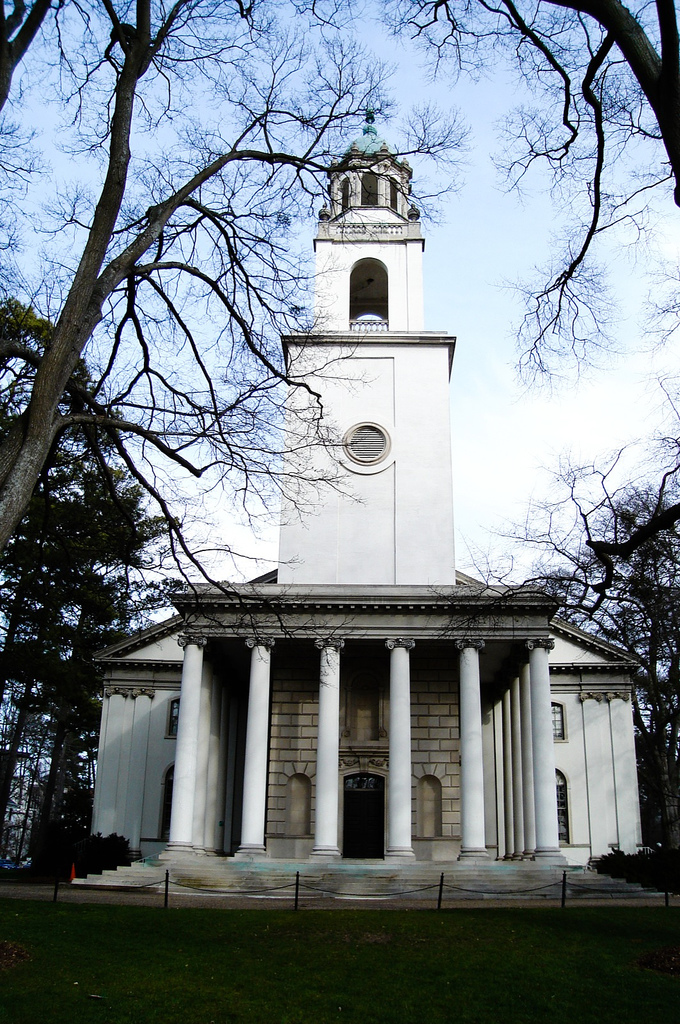
Glenn Memorial United Methodist Church is located on the campus of Emory University.

Emory College was founded in 1836 in Oxford, Georgia, by the Methodist Episcopal Church. The college was named in honor of the departed Methodist bishop John Emory. Ignatius Alphonso Few was the college's first president. In 1854, the Atlanta Medical College, a forerunner of Emory University School of Medicine, was founded. On April 12, 1861, the American Civil War began. Emory College was closed in November 1861 and all of its students enlisted on the Confederate side. In late 1863 the war reached Georgia and the college was used as hospital and later a headquarters for the Union Army. The university produced many officers who served in the war, including General George Thomas Anderson (1846C) who fought in nearly every major battle in the eastern theater. Thirty-five Emory students lost their lives and much of the campus was destroyed during the war.

In 1880, Atticus Greene Haygood, Emory College President, delivered a speech expressing gratitude for the end of slavery in the United States, which captured the attention of George I. Seney, a New York banker. Seney gave Emory College $5,000 to repay its debts, $50,000 for construction, and $75,000 to establish a new endowment. In the 1880s, the technology department was launched by Isaac Stiles Hopkins, a polymath professor at Emory College. Hopkins became the first president of the Georgia Institute of Technology in 1888. Emory University's first international student, Yun Chi-ho, graduated in 1893. Yun became an important political activist in Korea.

=== Twentieth century ===
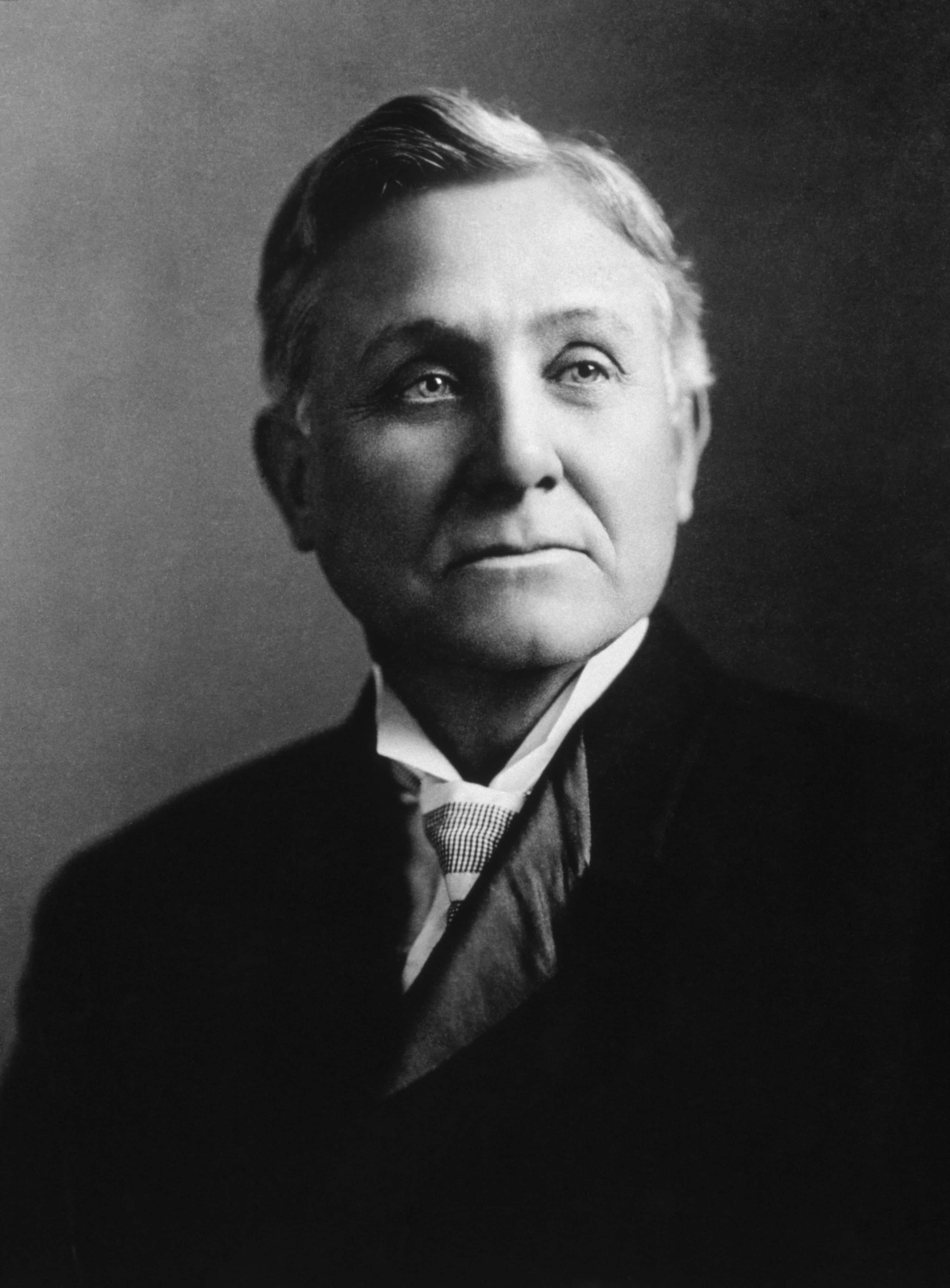
Asa Griggs Candler, founder of The Coca-Cola Company, provided a land grant for Emory College to relocate to metropolitan Atlanta and be rechartered as Emory University.

On August 16, 1906, the Wesley Memorial Hospital and Training School for Nurses, later renamed the Nell Hodgson Woodruff School of Nursing, was established. In 1914, the Candler School of Theology was established. In 1915, Emory College relocated to Druid Hills and was rechartered as Emory University after accepting a land grant from Asa Griggs Candler, founder of The Coca-Cola Company and brother of commissioned chair Warren Akin Candler Based on large donations from the Candler, Woodruff, and Goizueta families, Emory University is colloquially referred to as "Coca-Cola University". Emory University School of Law was established in 1916.

==== First and Second World Wars ====
In 1917, the United States joined the First World War, and Emory University responded by organizing a medical unit composed of faculty and alumni of the medical school. The unit, which became known as Emory Unit, Base Hospital 43, served in Loir-et-Cher, France, from July 1918 to January 1919. During the Second World War, the Emory Unit was mobilized once again and served in the North African campaign and Europe. Emory's contributions to the war effort were recognized by christening a ship, M.S. Emory Victory, which served during World War II and the Korean War.

In the 1940s, Emory University students, alumni, and faculty served in the Asia-Pacific War and European theater of World War II. Lieutenant Commander James L. Starnes, a graduate of Emory Law, was the navigator of the battleship USS Missouri and served as officer of the deck during the signing of the Japanese Instrument of Surrender. Bobby Jones, the golfer, served during the Battle of Normandy. Alfred A. Weinstein, a professor of surgery at Emory University School of Medicine, was a prisoner of war of the Empire of Japan between 1942 and 1945. His memoir, Barbed Wire Surgeon, is considered one of the finest accounts concerning allied prisoners under Japanese captivity and highlights the abuses of the war criminal Mutsuhiro Watanabe. Kiyoshi Tanimoto, who graduated from the Candler School of Theology in 1940 and is portrayed in John Hersey's Hiroshima, was able to organize the Hiroshima Maidens reconstructive surgery program based on the associations he made while studying in the United States. Tatsumasa Shirakawa, a Japanese student at the Candler School of Theology, was placed under arrest temporarily until Dean Henry Burton Trimble negotiated his release. Emory helped the nation prepare for war by participating in the V-12 Navy College Training Program and Army Specialized Training Program, programs designed to supplement the force of commissioned officers in the United States Navy and United States Army. The Candler School of Theology trained men for military chaplaincy. During the war, university enrollment boasted two military students for every one civilian.

=== Women's and civil rights movements ===
The women's movement and civil rights movement during the 1950s and 1960s in the United States profoundly shaped the future of Emory University. Formerly an all-male school, Emory officially became a coeducational institution in 1953. Although it had previously admitted women under limited circumstances, the university had never before had a policy through which they could enroll in large numbers and as resident students. In 1959, sororities first appeared on campus. In 1962, in the midst of the civil rights movement, Emory embraced the initiative to end racial restrictions when it asked the courts to declare portions of the Georgia statutes unconstitutional. Previously, Georgia law denied tax-exempt status to private universities with racially integrated student bodies. The Supreme Court of Georgia ruled in Emory's favor and Emory officially became racially integrated. Marvin S. Arrington Sr. was Emory University's first, full-time African American student and graduated from Emory University School of Law in 1967.

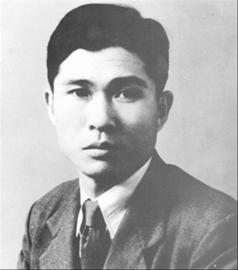
In 1983, Kim Dae-jung, while in political exile, gave a speech on human rights and democracy at Emory. He went on to serve as the eighth president of South Korea.

In 1971, Emory established one of the nation's first African-American studies programs and the first of its kind in the Southeastern United States. Emory's diversity and academic reputation continued to flourish under the leadership of the university's fifth president, James T. Laney. In addition to leading universities in the Southeastern United States in the promotion of racial equality, Laney and many of the school's faculty and administrators were outspoken advocates of global human rights and thus were openly opposed to the military dictatorship in South Korea (1961–1987). On March 30, 1983, Laney's friend Kim Dae-jung, while in political exile in the United States, presented a speech on human rights and democracy at Emory University and accepted an honorary Doctor of Laws degree. Kim would go on to play a major role in ending authoritarianism in South Korea, served as the eighth president of South Korea from 1998 to 2003, and was awarded the Nobel Peace Prize in 2000 for his successful implementation of the Sunshine Policy. Laney would later serve as United States Ambassador to South Korea and Emory graduate school, founded in 1919, was named in his honor in 2009.

In 2005, the university presented the President Medal, a rare award conferred only on individuals whose impact on the world has enhanced the dominion of peace or has enlarged the range of cultural achievement, to Civil Rights Movement activist Rosa Parks. The award is one of the highest honors presented by Emory.

In 2014, at Emory's 169th Commencement, John Lewis, the only living "Big Six" leader of the civil rights movement, delivered the keynote address and received an honorary doctor of laws degree. In 2015, Emory University School of Law received a $1.5 million donation to help establish a John Lewis Chair in Civil Rights and Social Justice. The gift, given anonymously, funds a professorship which will enable Emory Law to conduct a national search for a scholar with an established academic profile of distinction and a demonstrated desire to promote the rule of law through the study of civil rights. The law school has committed to raise an additional $500,000 to fund the chair fully.

=== Expansion and modernization ===
In November 1979, Emory University experienced a historical shift when Robert Winship Woodruff and George Waldo Woodruff donated $105 million worth of Coca-Cola stock to the institution. At that time, this was the largest single gift ever made to any institution of higher education in the United States.

=== Twenty-first century ===
The latest additions to the Atlanta Campus include buildings for cancer research, biomedical research, scientific computation, mathematics and science, vaccine research, and the performing arts.

Prior to 2018, the campus was in an unincorporated area, statistically counted in the Druid Hills census-designated place. In 2016 the university stated that it intended to petition to be annexed into the City of Atlanta; in 2017 the university leadership formally submitted its petition. The City of Atlanta annexed Emory's campus effective January 1, 2018, a part of its largest annexation within a period of 65 years; the Atlanta City Council voted to do so the prior December.

Gregory L. Fenves, formerly the president of the University of Texas at Austin, became Emory University's 21st president in August 2020.

The Gaza war sparked demonstrations around the U.S., including at Emory. On April 25, 2024, during a pro-Palestinian protest, immediately subsequent to each objecting to the police presence, police detained both philosophy chair Noëlle McAfee and arrested economics professor Caroline Fohlin, who was later charged with battery, following her battering by police. The College of Arts and Science adopted a motion the following day for a college faculty no-confidence vote for Greg Fenves, president of the university, with an electronic vote organized for the following week.

== Academics ==
=== Admissions ===
Undergraduate admissions statistics
- 2026 entering class

Test scores middle 50%
- SAT Total: 1500
- ACT Composite: 34

Emory University is considered highly selective. The median SAT score of the class of 2023 was 1500 and median ACT score was 34. In 2026, Emory University received 43,269 applications. The Class of 2030 comprises 2,002 incoming students selected from a pool of more than 43,000 applicants, including 1,469 first-year students entering Emory College of Arts and Sciences and 533 entering Oxford College. The class represents students from 46 states, Washington, D.C., Puerto Rico, the Northern Mariana Islands, and 71 countries outside the United States. Students entering Oxford College speak 48 languages other than English primarily at home, while students entering Emory College speak 62 non-English languages at home. First-generation college students comprise 18% of the Oxford College class and 16% of the Emory College class. The Class of 2030 includes 89 students participating in the QuestBridge National College Match program, including 52 at Emory College and five at Oxford College who were matched through the national program, with the remainder joining through the regular admission process.

=== Undergraduate schools ===
==== Emory College of Arts and Sciences ====
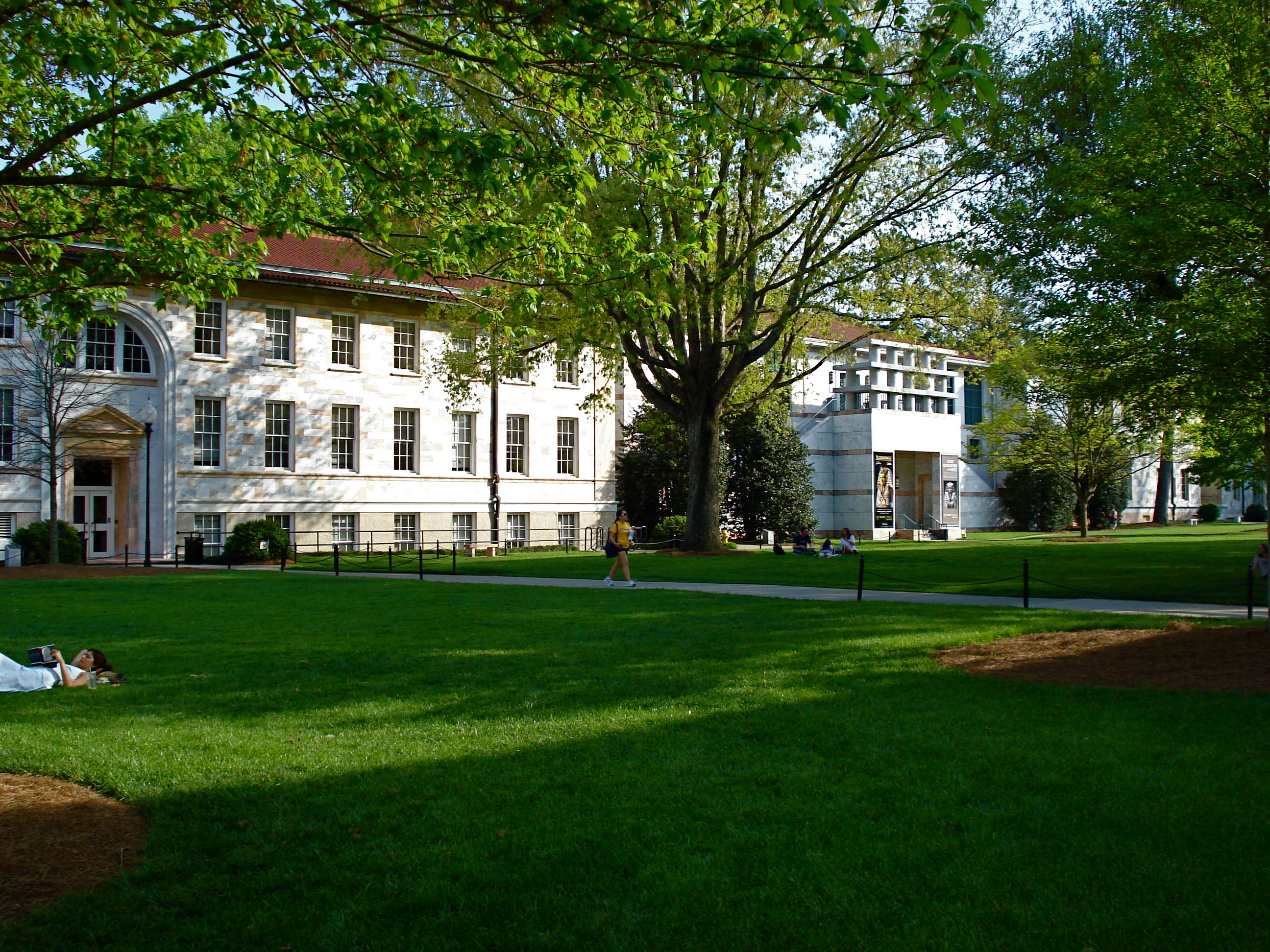
Main Quadrangle on Emory University's Druid Hills Campus

Emory College of Arts and Sciences offers the Bachelor of Arts (B.A.) and the Bachelor of Science (B.S) undergraduate academic degrees. The Emory-Tibet Partnership was established in 1998.

Emory University offers highly selective honors programs for high-performing undergraduates in most areas of concentration. More than 25% of undergraduates participate in an honors program each year.

Undergraduate/graduate schools
School	Year founded
Emory College of Arts and Sciences	1836
Oxford College	1836
Emory University School of Medicine	1854
Nell Hodgson Woodruff School of Nursing	1905
Candler School of Theology	1914
Emory University School of Law	1916
Laney Graduate School	1919
Goizueta Business School	1919
Rollins School of Public Health	1990

Emory University offers a five-year dual degree program in engineering, in collaboration with the Georgia Institute of Technology. Emory University also offers a dual master's degree in social work with the University of Georgia.

==== Oxford College ====
Oxford College offers an associate degree (A.A.) in liberal arts. Students who complete Oxford College advance to Emory College of Arts and Sciences, Goizueta Business School, or Nell Hodgson Woodruff School of Nursing to complete their undergraduate education.

=== Graduate and professional schools ===
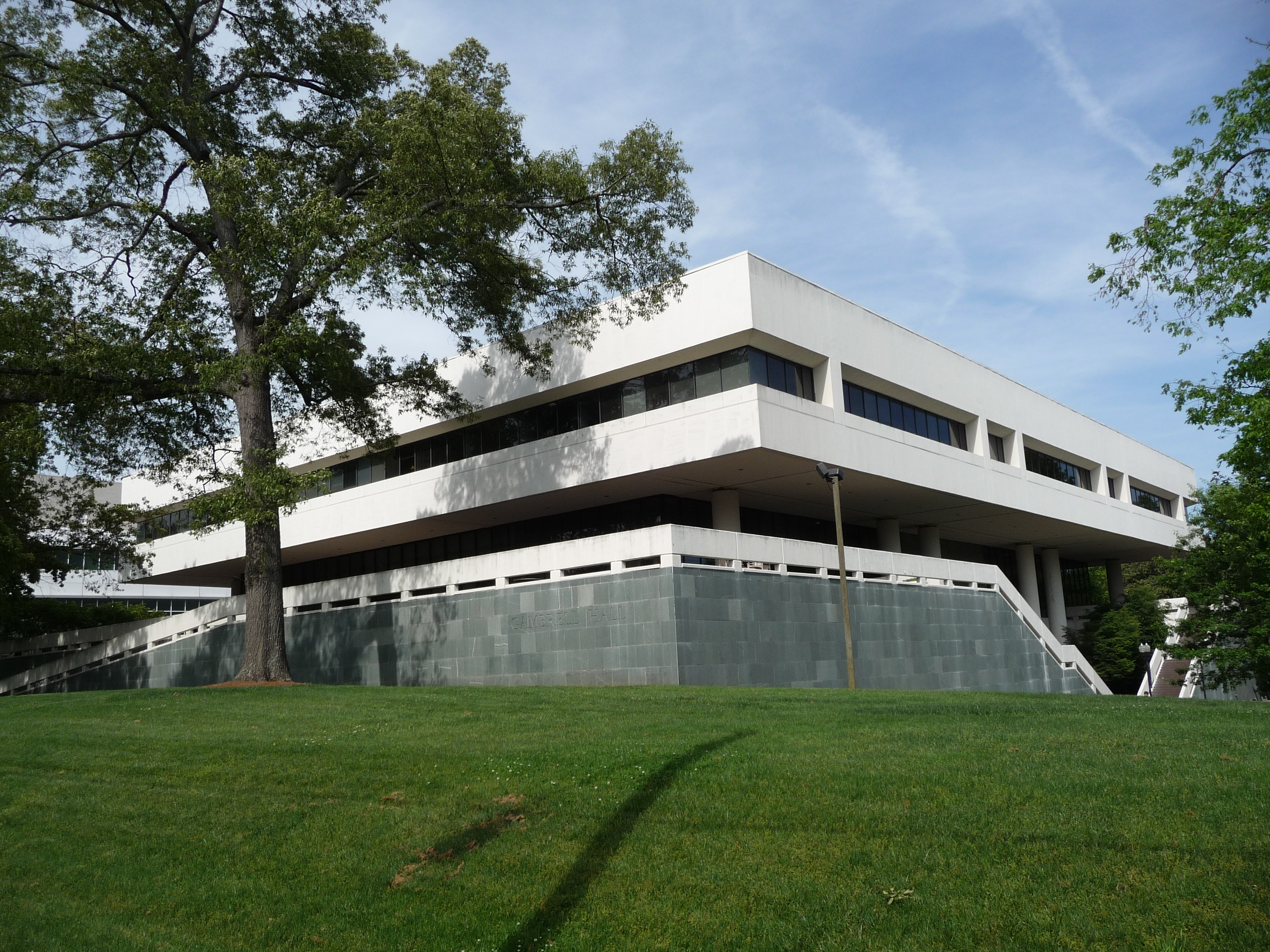
Gambrell Hall, Emory University School of Law

Emory University School of Medicine offers the Doctor of Medicine (MD), Doctor of Physical Therapy, and Master of Medical Science degrees.

The Nell Hodgson Woodruff School of Nursing offers the Bachelor of Science in Nursing (BSN), Masters of Science in Nursing, and Doctor of Nursing Practice (DNP).

Candler School of Theology is grounded in the Wesleyan tradition.

Emory University School of Law offers the Juris Doctor, Juris Master, Master of Laws, and Doctor of Juridical Science. It was founded in 1916 and was the first law school in Georgia to be granted membership in the American Association of Law Schools.

The Laney Graduate School offers the Doctor of Philosophy and Master of Arts degrees.

The Goizueta Business School offers the Bachelor of Business Administration, Master of Business Administration, Executive Master of Business Administration, and a Doctor of Philosophy in Business Administration.

The Rollins School of Public Health offers the Master of Public Health (MPH) and Master of Science in Public Health (MSPH) and Doctor of Philosophy degrees.

=== Library system ===
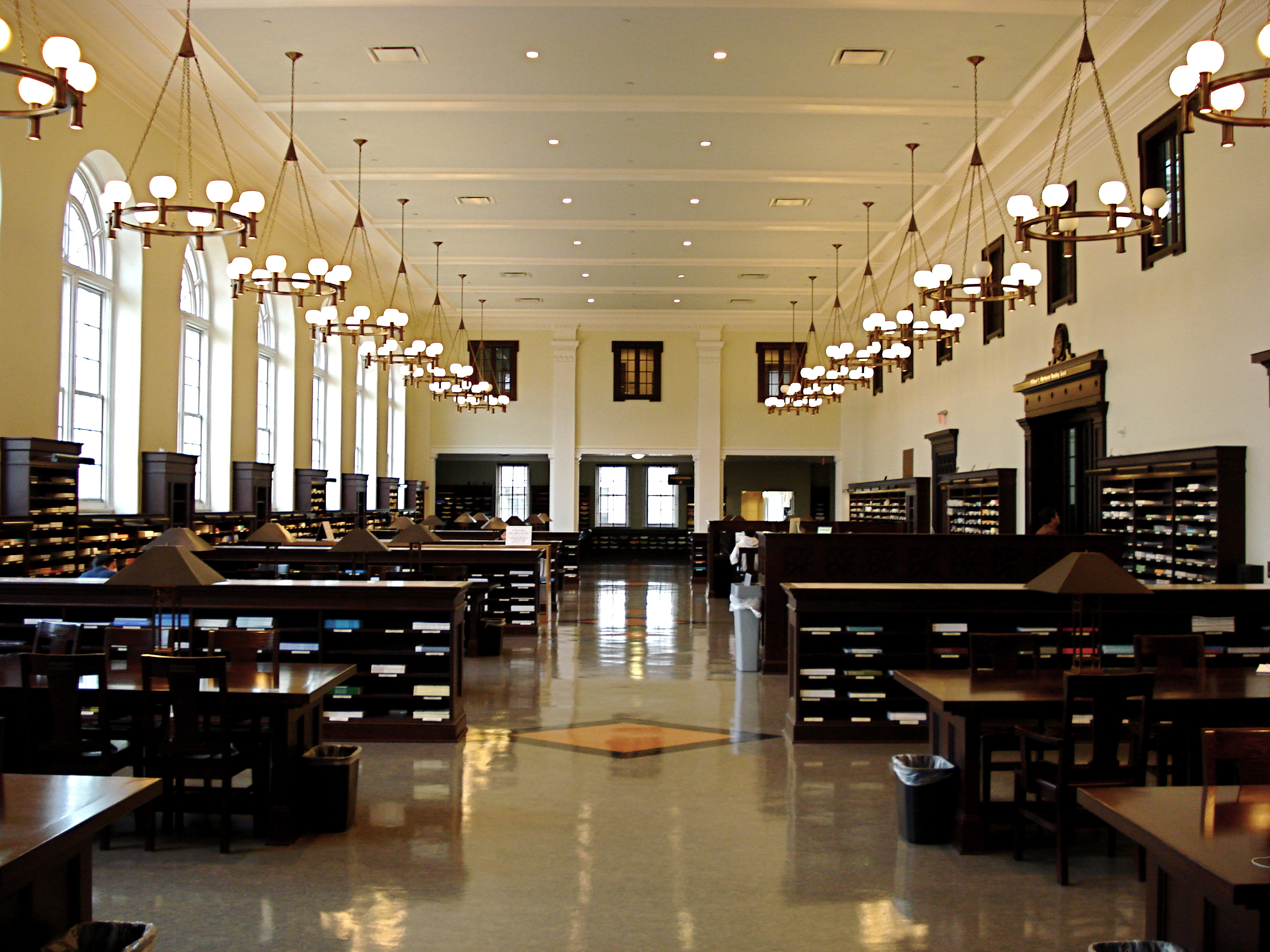
Matheson Reading Room, Candler Library Annex, Robert W. Woodruff Library

Emory University is a member of the Association of Research Libraries. The Emory University library system includes over 3.9 million print and electronic volumes and 83,000-plus electronic journals. The Rose Library contains rare materials relating to literature, African American history and culture, and Southern and Georgia history. Notable among the collections are papers of Flannery O'Connor, Alice Walker, Langston Hughes, Salman Rushdie, W. B. Yeats, Medbh McGuckian, Seamus Heaney, and Ted Hughes.

In 2012, The Princeton Review ranked Emory University among the "10 Colleges with the Best Libraries" in the United States.

=== Rankings and reputation ===
Academic rankings

National
- Forbes: 27
- U.S. News & World Report: 24
- Washington Monthly: 55
- WSJ/College Pulse: 20

Global
- ARWU: 101–150
- QS: 182
- THE: 98 (tie)
- U.S. News & World Report: 69

National program rankings
Program	Ranking
Biological Sciences	25
Biostatistics	11
Business	17
Chemistry	34
Clinical Psychology	18
Computer Science	74
Economics	53
English	26
History	26
Law	35
Mathematics	51
Medicine: Primary Care	64
Medicine: Research	23
Nursing: Doctorate	6
Nursing: Master's	1
Nursing–Midwifery	8
Physical Therapy	8
Physician Assistant	4
Physics	55
Political Science	19
Psychology	23
Public Health	4
Sociology	34

Global program rankings
Program	Ranking
Arts & Humanities	180
Biology & Biochemistry	92
Biotechnology and Applied Microbiology	119
Cardiac and Cardiovascular Systems	24
Cell Biology	45
Chemistry	270
Clinical Medicine	21
Computer Science	562
Economics & Business	203
Endocrinology and Metabolism	63
Environment/Ecology	273
Gastroenterology and Hepatology	87
Immunology	23
Infectious Diseases	15
Materials Science	353
Mathematics	281
Microbiology	28
Molecular Biology & Genetics	43
Neuroscience & Behavior	33
Oncology	29
Pharmacology & Toxicology	86
Physical Chemistry	381
Psychiatry/Psychology	42
Public, Environmental and Occupational Health	15
Radiology, Nuclear Medicine and Medical Imaging	43
Social Sciences & Public Health	51
Surgery	23

Emory University is ranked 24th among national universities in the United States and 69th among global universities by U.S. News & World Report for 2024-2025. Times Higher Education World University Rankings ranked Emory 20th in the United States and 82nd among global universities for 2022–2023. In 2023, QS University Rankings listed Emory as 155th among global universities. The university was ranked 17th among colleges and universities in the United States in a The Wall Street Journal survey.

Emory was named as one of the "25 New Ivies" in 2006 by Newsweek. Emory has also been referred to as a "Hidden Ivy". In 2024 and 2025, Forbes included Emory in its list of 20 "New Ivies".

The Princeton Review named Emory University School of Law as one of the best 169 law schools in the U.S. in 2014. The Emory University School of Law is ranked 35th in the nation according to U.S. News & World Report's 2023-2024 rankings.

Bloomberg Businessweek ranked Goizueta Business School's BBA Program ninth in the nation in 2014. In 2023, Goizueta Business School's MBA program ranked 17th in the nation by U.S. News & World Report and 16th in the nation by Bloomberg Businessweek. Financial Times ranked the MBA program 36th worldwide in 2023.

Times Higher Education World University Rankings placed the School of Medicine at #32 in the world for Clinical/Pre-clinical and Health in its 2019 rankings list. The Emory University School of Medicine is ranked 23rd in the nation from U.S. News & World Report's 2023–2024 rankings and also ranked 14th for Radiology, 16th for Surgery, #14 for Obstetrics and Gynecology, and 15th for Internal Medicine.

U.S. News & World Report ranked the Nell Hodgson Woodruff School of Nursing 1st in the nation for MSN programs and 3rd for BSN programs for its 2023–2024 rankings. QS University Rankings listed the Nell Hodgson Woodruff School of Nursing as the 25th top nursing school globally in 2023.

The Rollins School of Public Health ranked 3rd in the nation in 2024 by U.S. News & World Report.

The Wallace H. Coulter Department of Biomedical Engineering, a collaboration between Emory University and the Georgia Institute of Technology, was ranked 1st in the nation in 2024 by U.S. News & World Report.

==== Controversies ====
In 2012, Emory University underwent an internal investigation that revealed deliberate falsification of information by members of Emory University's Office of Admission and Institutional Research. These individuals intentionally misreported data concerning entering students' standardized test scores and class rankings between 2000 and 2012 to standard reference sources and third parties who rank colleges and universities. The falsified data aimed to boost the university's rankings. For example, while the office reported an 89% graduation rate within the top 10% of the class, the actual figure stood at only 75%. Following the investigation, the individuals responsible either resigned or were terminated, and the university issued a public apology to address the misconduct. To prevent future inaccuracies in data collection and reporting, Emory University took corrective actions in 2012 and 2013. These measures included the employment of independent data advisers to ensure the accuracy and integrity of the university's data management processes.

== Research ==
=== Facilities and partnerships ===
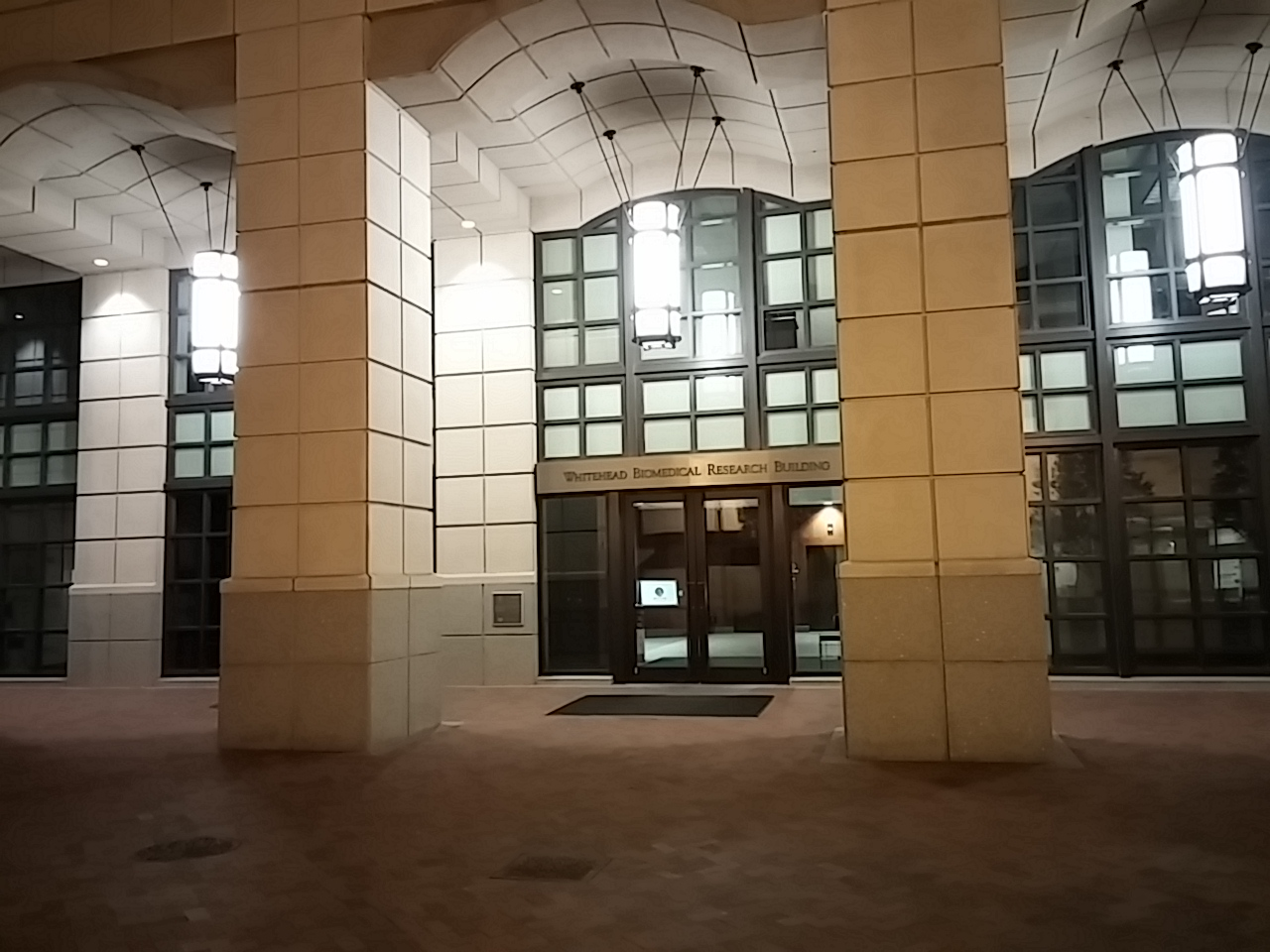
Whitehead Biomedical Research Building, Emory University

Emory University is classified among "R1: Doctoral Universities – Very high research activity". In 2021, Emory received $894.7 million from external funding agencies. Emory University leads the nation in the number of students with Kirschstein-National Research Service Award pre-doctoral fellowships from the National Institutes of Health (NIH).

In 1947, the university donated 15 acres (6 hectares) of land to the United States Department of Health and Human Services for the construction of the CDC headquarters. Emory University Prevention Research Center (EPRC) and Emory Center for Injury Control are funded by the CDC. Emory University's African Center of Excellence for Public Health Security, which seeks to improve preparedness and response to health threats in low-income countries, is a five-year, multimillion-dollar cooperative program with the CDC and International Association of National Public Health Institutes (IANPHI). Emory University Center for Global Safe Water (CGSW), which conducts applied research, evaluation, and training to promote global health equity through universal access to safe water, sanitation, and hygiene, works in collaboration with the CDC. Emory University Global Health Institute, funded by the Gates Foundation, partners with the CDC to enhance public health infrastructure in low-resource countries. Emory University Hospital Isolation Unit and Quarantine Station was established by the CDC following the 2003 SARS outbreak. The isolation and treatment facilities at Emory University played a crucial role in ending the 2014 ebola virus cases in the United States. CDC scientists and administrators hold memberships and frequently speak at Emory University's Vaccine Dinner Club (VDC), an association that holds monthly academic meetings to discuss and advance vaccine research. In 2015, Emory was made a member of the CDC's Prevention Epicenters Program, a research program in which CDC's Division of Healthcare Quality Promotion (DHQP) collaborates with academic investigators to conduct innovative infection control and prevention research.

In 2015, Emory University, the London School of Hygiene & Tropical Medicine, the Public Health Foundation of India, and the All India Institute of Medical Sciences established the Center for Control of Chronic Conditions in New Delhi, India. The center aims to improve the prevention and care of diabetes, heart disease, cancer, mental health, and injuries in India.

The International Association of National Public Health Institutes is based at the university. The association was chartered in 2006 with a $20 million, five-year grant through Emory University from the Bill & Melinda Gates Foundation. In 2015, the Emory Global Health Institute and CDC were made lead partners for the newly created, $75 million Bill & Melinda Gates Foundation-funded Child Health and Mortality Prevention Surveillance Network (CHAMPS).

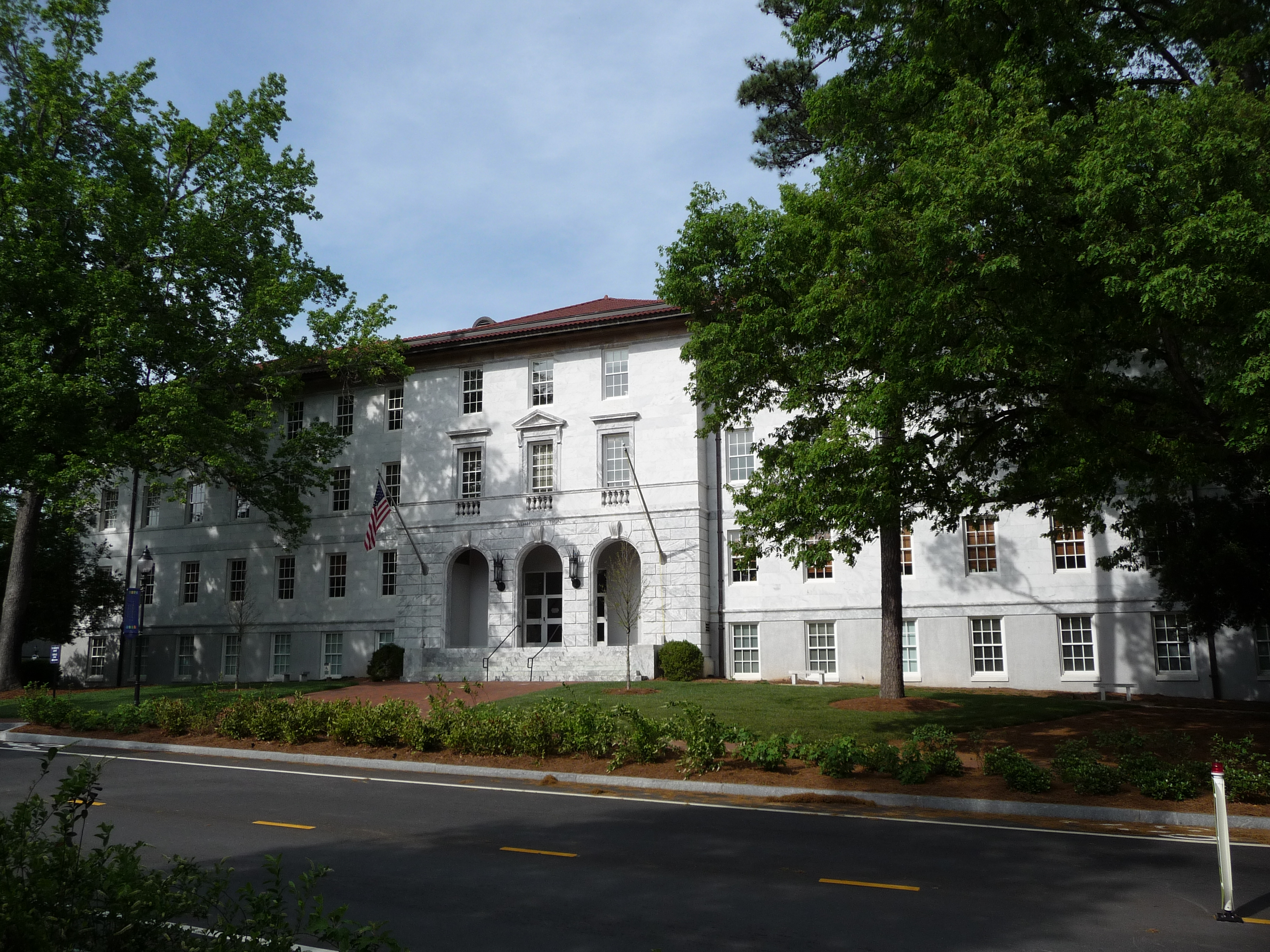
Dowman Administration Building

Emory University research is heavily funded by the United States Department of Health and Human Services's National Institutes of Health. The federal agency awarded the university nearly $600 million in the fiscal year of 2021. In 2015, Emory University was one of four institutions selected by the National Institute of Allergy and Infectious Diseases for its seven-year, multimillion-dollar Tuberculosis Research Units (TBRU) program, which aims to drive innovation in tuberculosis research and reduce the global burden of the disease. In 2015, an Emory-led research consortium received a five-year, $15 million grant from the National Institutes of Health to research human immune responses to Varicella zoster virus and pneumococcal vaccination. The university also received a $9 million grant over five years from the NIH to support one of three national Centers for Collaborative Research in Fragile X syndrome. The grant is a renewal of Emory's National Fragile X Research Center, continuously funded by the NIH for more than 10 years. In 2015, the university received an $8.9 million grant over five years from the NIH National Heart, Lung, and Blood Institute (NHLBI) to better understand the role of reactive oxygen species and inflammation in blood vessel function and to explore new interventions and preventive approaches for atherosclerosis and aortic aneurysms. In 2015, the university received an $8 million grant over five years from the NIH to develop and validate mathematical models of how prior immunity affects recall immune responses to influenza viruses. The researchers will create and disseminate powerful, user-friendly modeling tools for use by the wider research community in developing more effective vaccines. In 2015, the university received a $3.6 million grant over five years from the NIH to examine the effects of maternal stress on brain function, development, and behavior in African-American infants, including the biochemical connection between the brain and the microbiome. In 2015, the university received a $3.5 million grant over five years from the NIH National Cancer Institute (NCI) for an Informatics Technology for Cancer Research award. Winship Cancer Institute and Emory School of Medicine researchers will develop software tools to help the cancer research community gain new insights from cancer imaging "big data" and develop new open-source cancer research applications. In 2015, the university received a $3.4 million grant from the NIH International Collaborations in Infectious Disease Research Program to support a partnership between the Emory Vaccine Center and the International Centre for Genetic Engineering and Biotechnology (ICGEB) in New Delhi, India to study dengue virus infection in India.

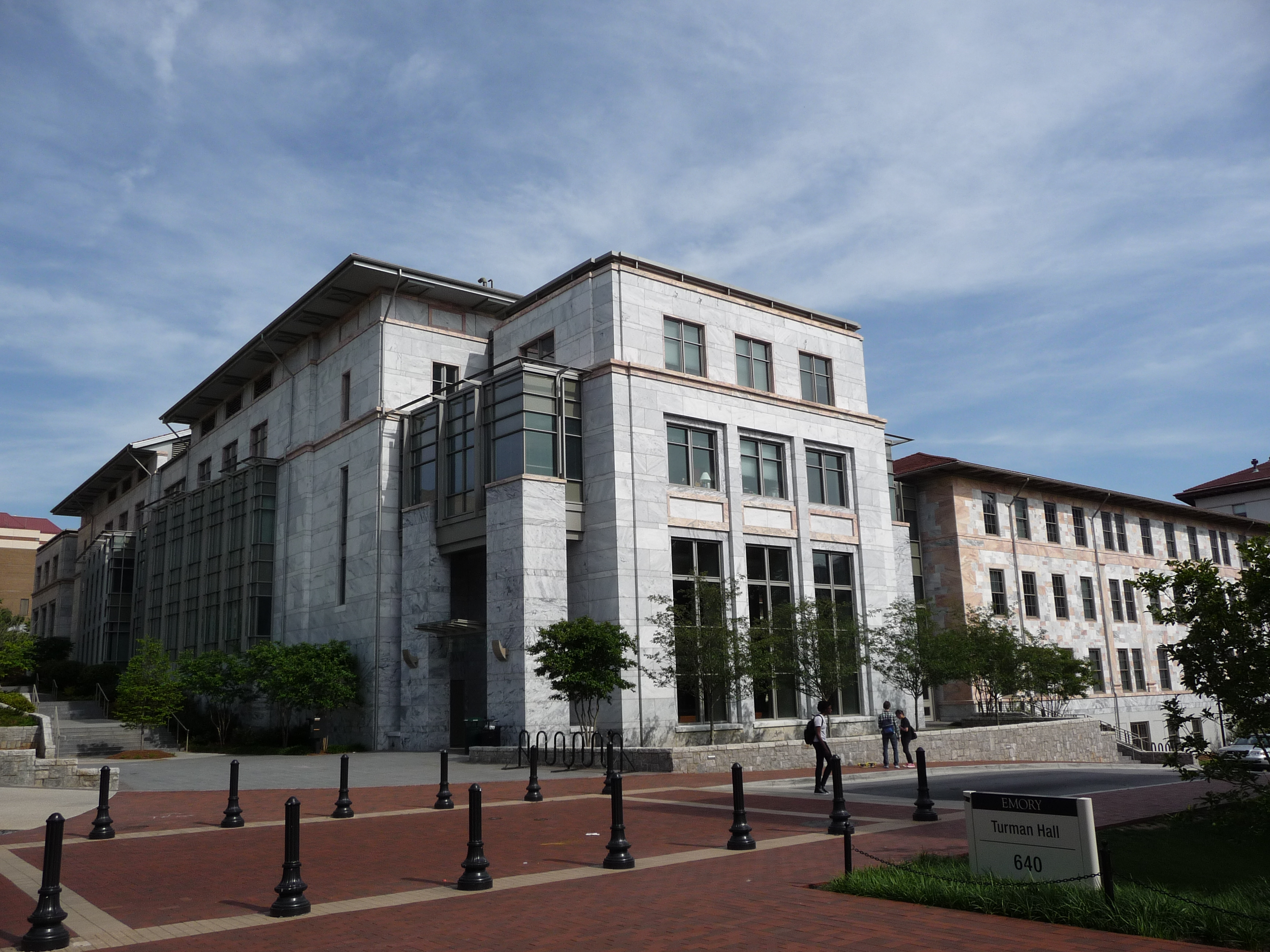
James B. Williams Medical Education Building, Emory University School of Medicine

The Emory University Center for AIDS Research (CFAR) and the Emory Vaccine Center are world leaders in AIDS Vaccine Development and HIV Pathogenesis studies are funded by nine different institutes of the NIH and by the Georgia Research Alliance. The centers include one of the largest groups of academic vaccine scientists in the world and are currently attempting to develop an effective HIV vaccine. Emory University researchers Dennis C. Liotta, Raymond F. Schinazi, and Woo-Baeg Choi discovered Emtricitabine, a nucleoside reverse-transcriptase inhibitor (NRTI) used in the treatment of HIV. The drug was named as one of the world's most important antiviral drugs by the World Health Organization and is included in their Model List of Essential Medicines.

Emory University was one of three institutions that successfully treated medical evacuees during the 2014 ebola outbreak. In 2015, the United States Department of Health and Human Services named Emory University the lead coordinating center for the National Ebola Training and Education Center (NETEC). The university collaborated with the University of Nebraska Medical Center, the New York City Health and Hospitals Corporation, the CDC and the Office of the Assistant Secretary for Preparedness and Response on the program, which received $12 million. The university also received a $10.8 million grant over three years from the U.S. Department of Defense's Defense Advanced Research Projects Agency (DARPA) to lead a 10-institution national team developing improved therapeutics and vaccines for multiple strains of Ebola virus. In 2015, Emory received a three-year, $2.2 million grant from the CDC to prevent the spread of infectious diseases, including Ebola, in health-care facilities.

In 2015, Emory and Georgia Tech were awarded an $8.3 million grant by the NIH to establish a National Exposure Assessment Laboratory. The laboratory will research the impact of environmental chemicals on children's health. In 2015, the two universities received a five-year, $2.9 million grant from the National Science Foundation (NSF) to create new bachelor's, master's, and doctoral degree programs and concentrations in healthcare robotics, which will be the first program of its kind in the Southeastern United States. In 2015, Emory University, Georgia Tech, and Children's Healthcare of Atlanta were awarded a four-year, $1.8 million grant by the Cystic Fibrosis Foundation in order to expand the Atlanta Cystic Fibrosis Research and Development Program. As of 2015, Emory jointly manages the second-largest cystic fibrosis population in the United States. In 2015, Emory and Georgia Tech received a $1.6 million grant from the Coulter Translational Research Partnership Program to accelerate nine promising technologies developed in research laboratories with commercialization potential.

In 2015, Emory University received a $15 million grant from the Wounded Warrior Project in order to establish the "Warrior Care Network" and develop innovative approaches to treat veterans with post-traumatic stress disorder (PTSD) and traumatic brain injury (TBI).

In 2015, Emory University and the University of South Florida received a $2.5 million grant over five years from the John E. Fogarty International Center to study links between infectious disease transmission and agricultural practices.

In 2023, Emory celebrated the opening of Georgia's largest health sciences research building. The eight-story, 350,000-square-foot building houses more than 1,000 researchers, including 130 principal investigators, from across a variety of specialties including: pediatrics, biomedical engineering, Winship Cancer Institute, cardiovascular medicine, the Emory Vaccine Center, radiology and brain health. The project cost $313 million to complete.

In 2023, Emory became a founding member of the Global Universities for Societal Impact network consisting of University of Bonn, Hebrew University of Jerusalem, University of St Andrews, and Waseda University to deepen partnership in education, research, leadership and innovation.

== Campuses ==
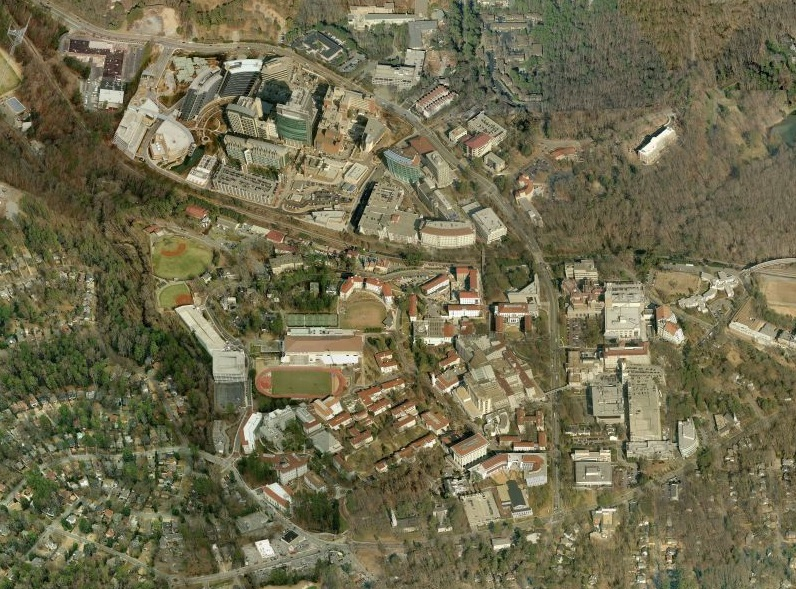
Aerial view of Emory University's campus (bottom) and the Centers for Disease Control and Prevention (top)

Emory University's original campus was established in Oxford, Georgia, in 1836. The 56-acre (23-hectare) campus, located 38 miles (61 kilometers) east of Emory's Atlanta Campus, is home to Oxford College of Emory University and was the site of military headquarters and infirmaries during the American Civil War. Many of the buildings were designed with Neoclassical architecture and Gothic Revival architecture. In 1975, the United States National Register of Historic Places designated the campus as part of the Oxford Historic District.

Emory's Atlanta Campus, established in the early twentieth century on a Beaux-Arts master plan by Pittsburgh architect Henry Hornbostel, covers more than 600 acres (240 hectares) in Atlanta's historic neighborhood of Druid Hills. The university campus is heavily forested with pine, maples, oak, and magnolias, and Peavine Creek, a branch of the Peachtree Creek, runs through the campus. The Arbor Day Foundation named Emory a Tree Campus USA school in 2015. Many of the university's buildings are designed with multi-hued granite and Spanish Saltillo tile. The university has one of the largest inventories by square footage of Leadership in Energy and Environmental Design-certified building space among campuses in the United States.

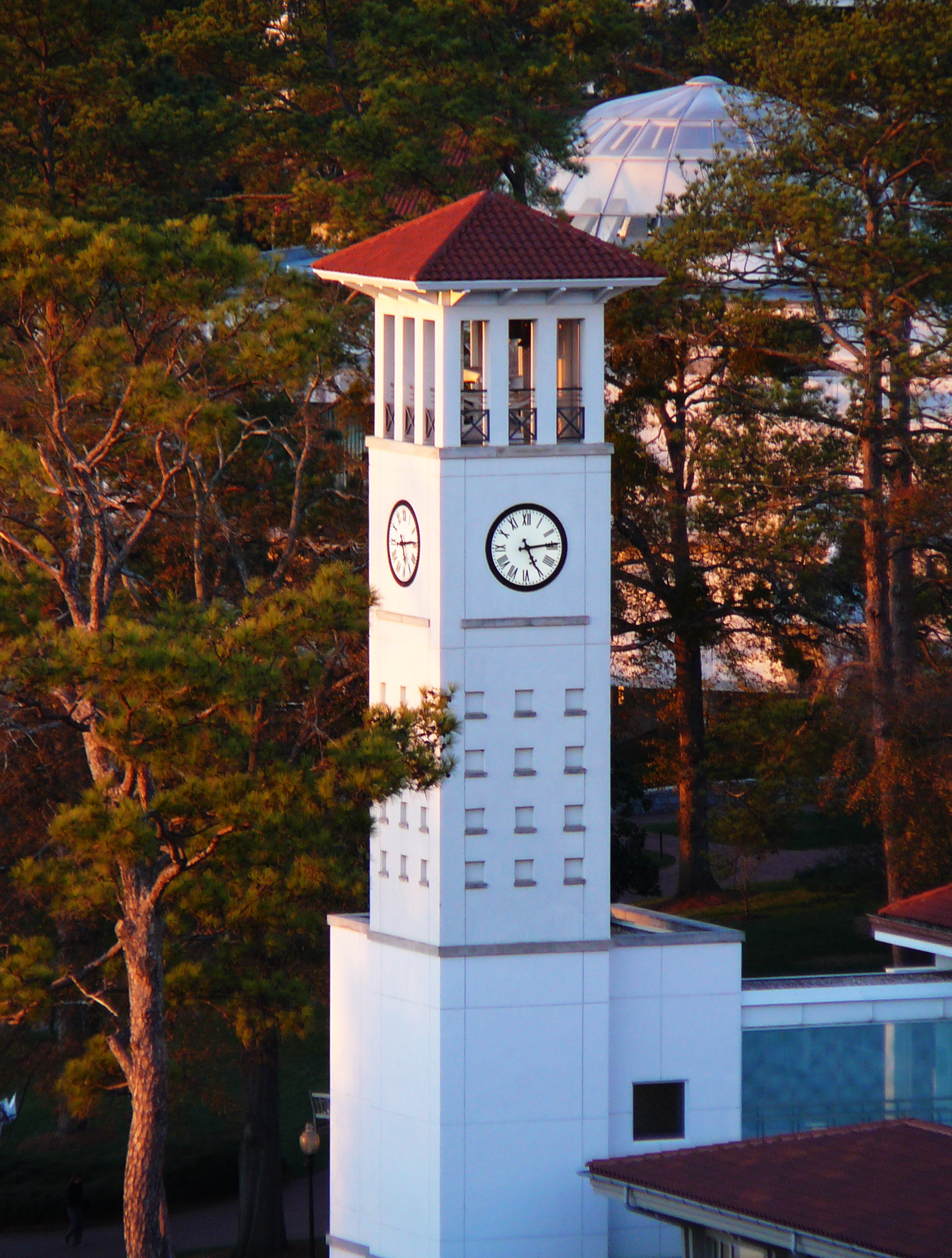
Robinson Clock Tower at Cox Hall

The campus is home to Emory University Hospital, Michael C. Carlos Museum, which has the largest collection of ancient artifacts in the Southeastern United States, the Winship Cancer Institute, Georgia's first and only cancer center designated by the National Cancer Institute, the Yerkes National Primate Research Center, one of eight National Institutes of Health-funded national primate research centers, and a number of other academic, art, medical, and student facilitates. In 1991, Emory opened the first collegiate LGBT student center in the Southeastern United States which is the tenth oldest in the nation. The Centers for Disease Control and Prevention, American Cancer Society, Children's Healthcare of Atlanta Egleston hospital, and Emory Point are located adjacent to the campus.

In 2015, a $52 million expansion and renovation project of the Sanford S. Atwood Chemistry Center was completed. The new, 270,000-square-foot (25,000 m^{2}) complex contains laboratories, interactive teaching and study spaces, and a chemistry library. The completion of the complex was accompanied by a $1.2 million grant from the Howard Hughes Medical Institute to advance and modernize the university's chemistry curriculum.

In the Candler Library Annex of Robert W. Woodruff Library, there is a 1920s Pietro Caproni reproduction of Bertel Thorvaldsen's "The Triumph of Alexander" frieze. The frieze depicts Alexander the Great and his army entering Babylon after their victory over the Achaemenid Empire at the Battle of Gaugamela.

During the 1996 Summer Olympics in Atlanta, the university hosted the United States Olympic women's gymnastics team on its Atlanta Campus. The team, known as the Magnificent Seven, won the first-ever gold medal for the United States in the women's team all-around competition. The university housed international officials and journalists and served as a training facility for Olympians. The Cox Hall Ballroom was transformed into a news center for the Olympic foreign press.

In February 2017, Emory announced that its R. Howard Dobbs University Center, built in 1986 from a neofuturistic postmodernist design by local architect John C. Portman Jr., to house the university's main student/faculty center and dining hall (Coca-Cola Commons), would be demolished and replaced with a new $98 million Campus Life Center, designed by Durham, North Carolina–based Duda Paine Architects. Reasons given for the replacement included inconvenience of food delivery to the dining hall, undersized kitchen facilities, and inadequate fenestration in the Commons. The Emory Student Center (ESC), opened in May 2019, includes a dining hall, study and collaboration spaces, game room, a 1,400-plus-person multipurpose space, coffee shop, and food emporium. It is the first building on Emory's campus to receive a LEED platinum rating.

== Student life ==
Student body composition as of May 2, 2022
Race and ethnicity	Total
White	37%
Asian	23%
Foreign national	15%
Hispanic	11%
Black	9%
Other (Note: Other consists of multiracial Americans & those who prefer to not say.)	5%
Economic diversity
Low-income (Note: The percentage of students who received an income-based federal Pell grant intended for low-income students.)	21%
Non-low income (Note: The percentage of students who are a part of the American middle class at the bare minimum.)	79%

=== Student body ===
In fall 2024, the university had a total enrollment of 16,142 students, with a full-time equivalent (FTE) enrollment of 15,121. Of the total enrolled students, 60.2% identified as female (9,719) and 39.8% as male (6,423). The age distribution included 0.6% under age 18, 65.4% between the ages of 18 and 24, and 34.1% who were 25 or older.

Emory reported that 23.5% of students (3,800) identified as members of historically underrepresented groups (HUGs), while 76.5% (12,342) did not. Regarding first-generation college student status, 7.5% (1,210) of undergraduates identified as first-generation, 41.0% (6,616) were non-first-generation students, and 3.4% (548) had an unknown status. Graduate students made up 48.1% of the total enrollment (7,768).

In terms of racial and ethnic diversity, 0.1% of students identified as American Indian or Alaskan Native, 19.7% as Asian, 13.8% as Black or African American, 9.6% as Hispanic or Latino, and 0.1% as Native Hawaiian or other Pacific Islander. Students identifying as two or more races comprised 9.4% of the population, while 32.2% identified as White. Nonresident aliens, typically international students, represented 18.2% of the total enrollment, and 2.5% of students had race or ethnicity listed as unknown.

Ninety-six percent of enrolled students (15,494) were pursuing a degree, while 4.0% (648) were non-degree-seeking. Emory's academic career distribution was nearly even, with 51.9% of students enrolled as undergraduates (8,374) and 48.1% as graduate or professional students (7,768). Most students, 90.5% (14,610), were enrolled full-time, while 9.5% (1,532) are part-time.

With regard to residency, 21.0% of students were from the state of Georgia, 60.9% were from out of state, and 18.2% were international students. Students were distributed across Emory's nine academic divisions: Emory College of Arts and Sciences enrolled the largest share at 34.5% (5,567), followed by Goizueta Business School at 14.4% (2,319), Laney Graduate School at 13.0% (2,092), and the Nell Hodgson Woodruff School of Nursing at 8.6% (1,393). Other divisions included the School of Medicine (6.4%, 1,032), Oxford College (6.0%, 967), Rollins School of Public Health (6.1%, 977), School of Law (5.2%, 839), Allied Health Programs (3.3%, 534), and Candler School of Theology (2.6%, 422).

=== Arts ===
Students may engage in the performing and fine arts as an area of academic study or as extracurricular activities. Undergraduates may pursue a major in the performing arts (dance, theater, or music) or in film studies, art history, visual arts, or creative writing. Graduate programs in art history, film studies, and music are offered. There are more than 50 student organizations dedicated to the arts. Students can explore artistic interests as diverse as architecture, breakdancing, poetry, and improvisational comedy. Emory routinely hosts arts events in the Schwartz Center for Performing Arts that are open to the Emory and Atlanta communities. Recent performances include Bang on a Can All-Stars (a side project of drummer Glenn Kotche from the rock band Wilco), jazz performer Esperanza Spalding, and New York's Cedar Lake Dance Company. A program called Creativity Conversations brings artistic minds to campus to discuss art and the creative process. Guests have included Philip Glass, Jimmy Carter, Salman Rushdie, Seamus Heaney and Rita Dove. Rita Dove also gave the keynote address at Emory's 2013 Commencement.

=== Barkley Forum ===
The Barkley Forum Center for Debate Education is an intercollegiate debate organization at Emory University. The center is named in honor of Emory alumnus Alben Barkley, 35th vice president of the United States. Debating was established at the university in 1837 and the intercollegiate debate team was formed in 1914. Emory's Barkley Forum debate team has won three National Debate Tournaments and over 25 individual champion speaker awards.

=== Community service ===
The university received the 2008 Presidential Award for General Community Service, which is the highest federal recognition given to higher education institutions for their commitment to community service, service-learning and civic engagement. Emory Cares International Service Day contributes to projects organized by Emory and partners around the city of Atlanta, and beyond.

=== Newspaper ===
The Emory Wheel is the student-run newspaper of Emory University. Serving the Emory community since 1919, the Wheel is editorially and financially independent from the university. The staff is composed entirely of students, with the exception of the general manager, who oversees advertising and whose salary is paid by the newspaper.

=== Greek life ===
Fraternities have existed on Emory's campus as early as 1840. One early chronicler makes the case that Emory's "temple" of the Mystic Seven may have been the first chapter of a national fraternity established anywhere in the South. Today, approximately 20% of the Emory student population participates. There are approximately eight sorority chapters and eleven fraternity chapters.

=== Student organizations ===
Hundreds of student clubs and organizations operate on Emory's campus. These include numerous student government, special interest, and service organizations. The Student Government Association charters and provides most of the funding for other student groups and represents students' interests when dealing with the administration. Emory also has several secret societies—the Paladin Society, the D.V.S. Senior Honor Society, Ducemus, Speculum, and the Order of Ammon. Coca-Cola pledged three million dollars over a five-year period for "Service for Learning," which coordinates Emory student volunteers in various projects.

There is an intramural sports program and a variety of recreational and competitive intramural teams.

== Athletics ==
Emory's 18 varsity sports teams, known as the Eagles, are members of the NCAA's Division III in the University Athletic Association (UAA). Emory consistently ranks among top schools in the Directors' Cup of the National Association of Collegiate Directors of Athletics (NACDA) for best all-around athletics program.

== Notable alumni and faculty ==
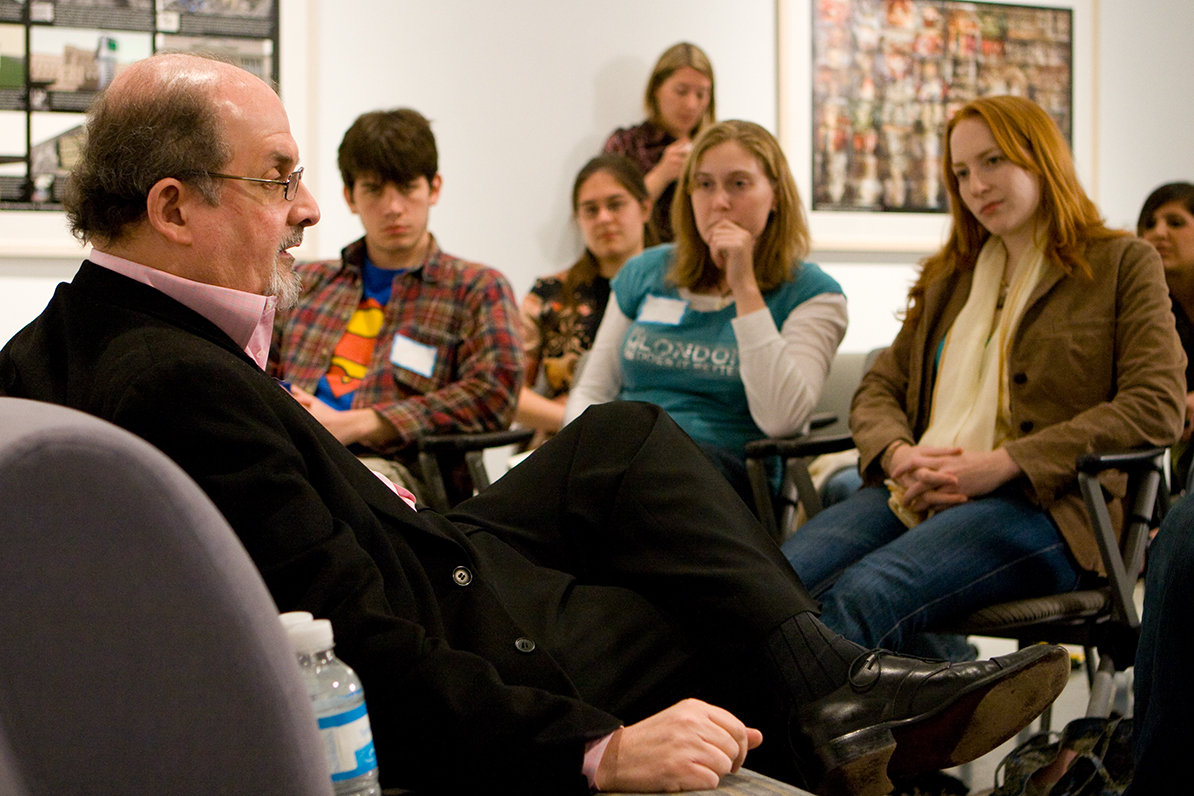
Author Salman Rushdie, Booker Prize-winning novelist, having a discussion with Emory University students

Emory University has over 13,200 faculty and staff members and over 133,000 living alumni.

Notable alumni include Alben Barkley (BA 1900), 35th vice president of the United States; Isaac Stiles Hopkins (1859C) and Robert Stewart Hyer (BA 1881, MA 1882), founding presidents of Georgia Institute of Technology and Southern Methodist University, respectively; Young John Allen (1858C), American Methodist missionary in the late Qing Dynasty, China; Thomas Milton Rivers (1909C); Dumas Malone, Jefferson biographer and director of the Harvard University Press (AB, 1910); Ernest Cadman Colwell (1923C, 1927 PhD), president of the University of Chicago; Bobby Jones (Law 1929), the only golfer to win a Grand Slam, founder of the Masters Golf Tournament, and regarded as one of the greatest golfers of all time; Ely Callaway Jr. (1940C), founder of the Callaway Golf Company; Ernie Harwell (1940C), baseball broadcaster for the Detroit Tigers; Arnall Patz (BA 1943, MD 1945), Lee Hong-koo (1959C), 26th prime minister of the Republic of Korea; Newt Gingrich (BA 1965), speaker of the House of Representatives; Sonny Carter, NASA astronaut, crew member of STS-33 Space Shuttle mission (1969C); Peter Buck, guitarist for the band R.E.M.; Stephen Crotts (1975 M.Div), Presbyterian minister and author; Kenneth Cole (BA 1976), clothing designer and founder of Kenneth Cole Productions; Christopher McCandless (1990C), Alaskan wilderness adventurer and main subject of Jon Krakauer's Into the Wild; Fala Chen (2005C), Chinese American actress; Kirsten Haglund (2013C), Miss America 2008; Duncan L. Niederauer, chief executive officer of the New York Stock Exchange (NYSE); Elizabeth Prelogar (BA 2002), and 48th Solicitor General of the United States.

Notable faculty include Jimmy Carter, 39th president of the United States; Sir Salman Rushdie, Booker Prize-winning novelist; Desmond Tutu, Nobel Peace Prize recipient; William Foege, Centers for Disease Control and Prevention director; Nathan McCall, New York Times bestselling author; James T. Laney, president of Emory University, United States ambassador to Korea from 1993 to 1997; Natasha Trethewey, Pulitzer Prize winner; U.S. poet laureate John L. Coney and Sanjay Gupta, CNN chief medical correspondent; and Jericho Brown, MacArthur Fellow and poet.

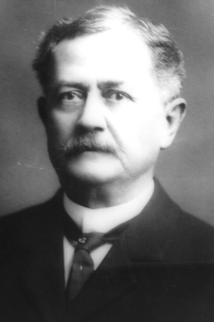
Isaac S. Hopkins, first president of the Georgia Institute of Technology (1859C)

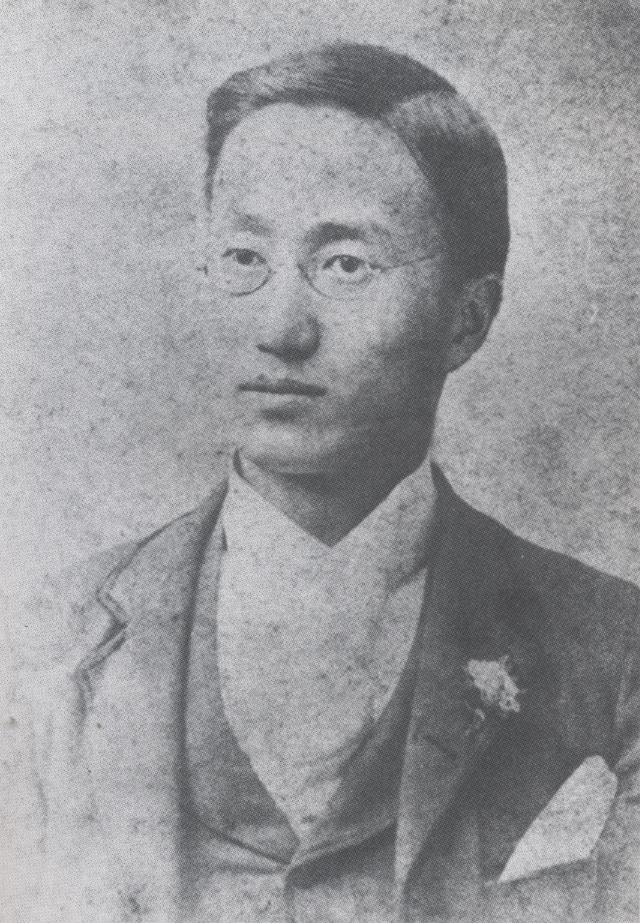
Yun Chi-ho, author of "Aegukga", national anthem of South Korea (1893C)

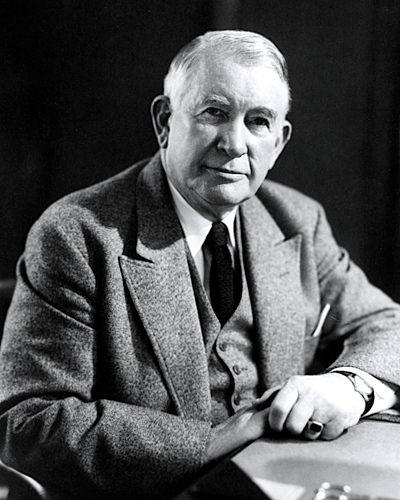
Alben Barkley, 35th vice president of the United States (1900C, 1949H)

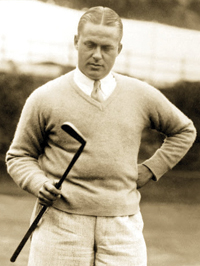
Bobby Jones, only golfer to win a Grand Slam and founder of the Masters Tournament (1929JD)

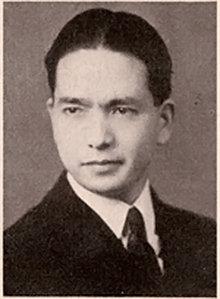
Kiyoshi Tanimoto, Hibakusha portrayed in John Hersey's Hiroshima, organized the Hiroshima Maidens program (1940T, 1986H)

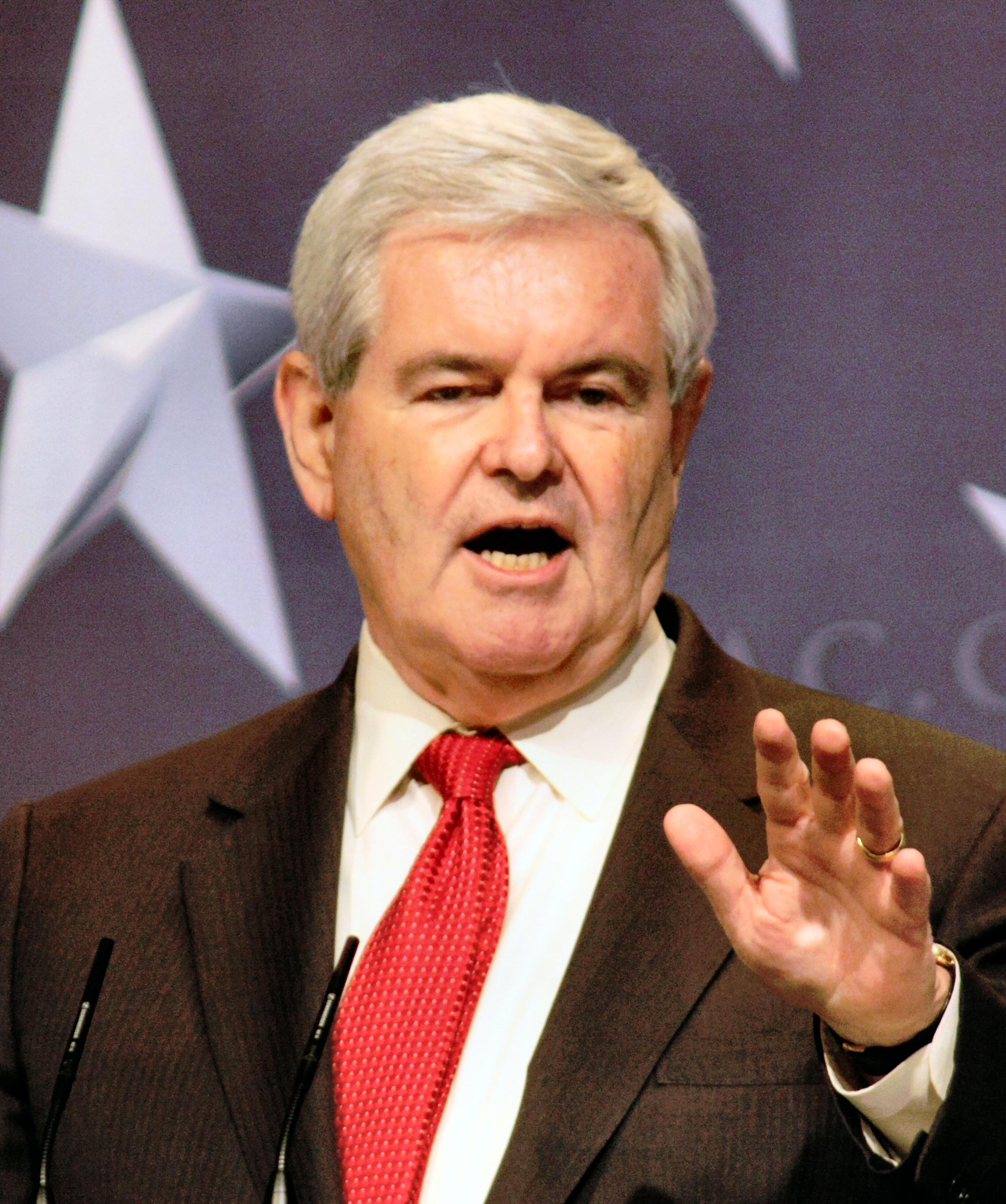
Newt Gingrich, 50th Speaker of the United States House of Representatives (1965C)

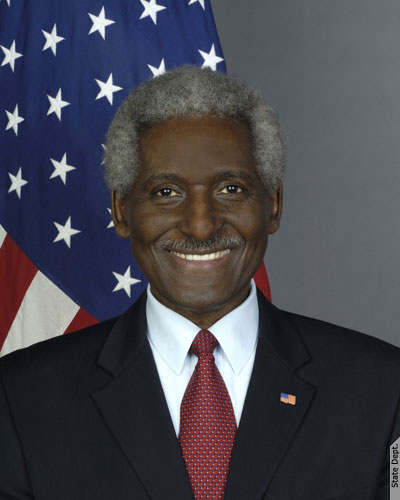
Larry Leon Palmer, United States Ambassador to Barbados and the Eastern Caribbean (1970C)

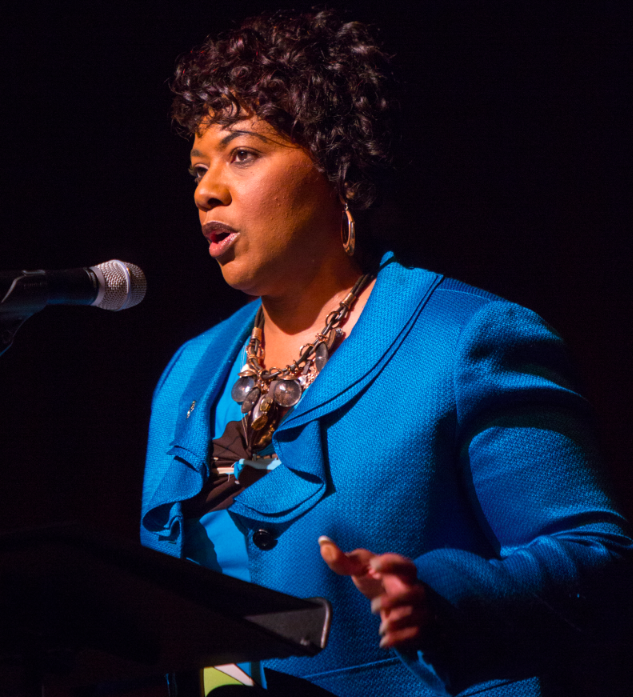
Bernice King, minister and activist, the youngest child of Coretta and Martin Luther King Jr. (1990JD)

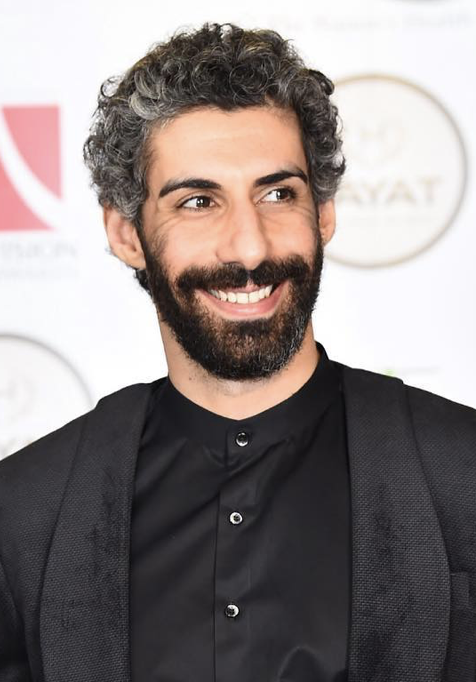
Jim Sarbh, Indian film and stage actor and screen award winner

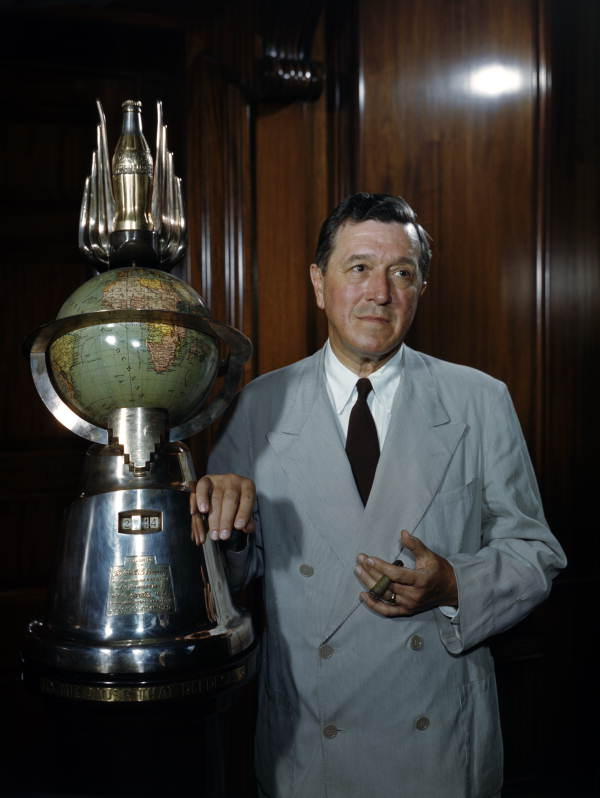
Robert W. Woodruff, president of the Coca-Cola Company from 1923 until 1954 (Did not graduate)

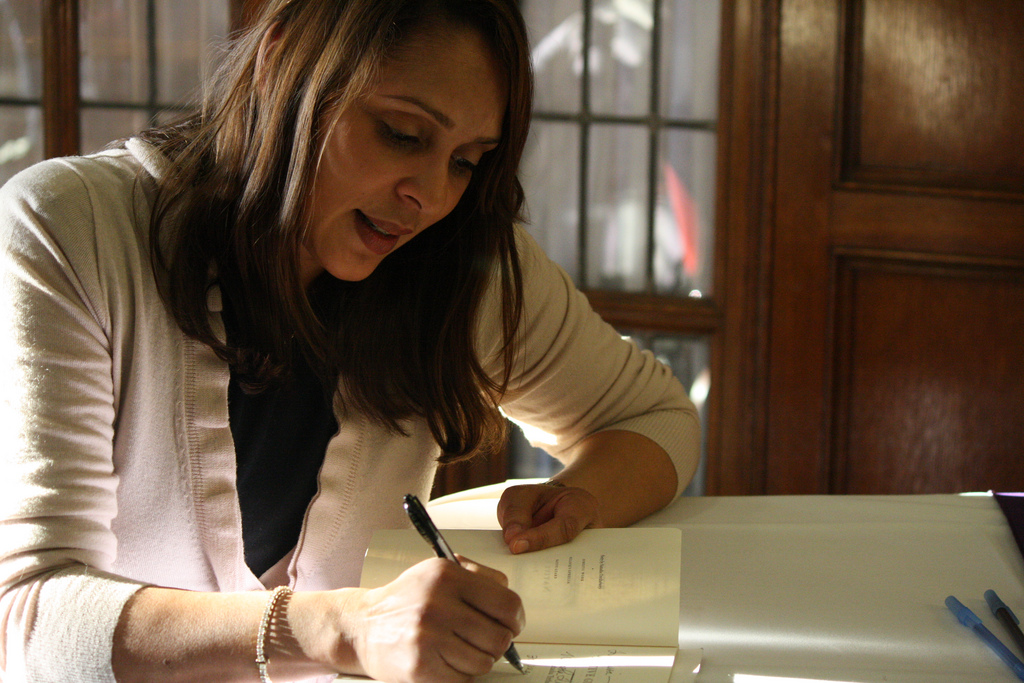
Natasha Trethewey, 19th U.S. Poet Laureate, Robert W. Woodruff Professor of English and Creative Writing

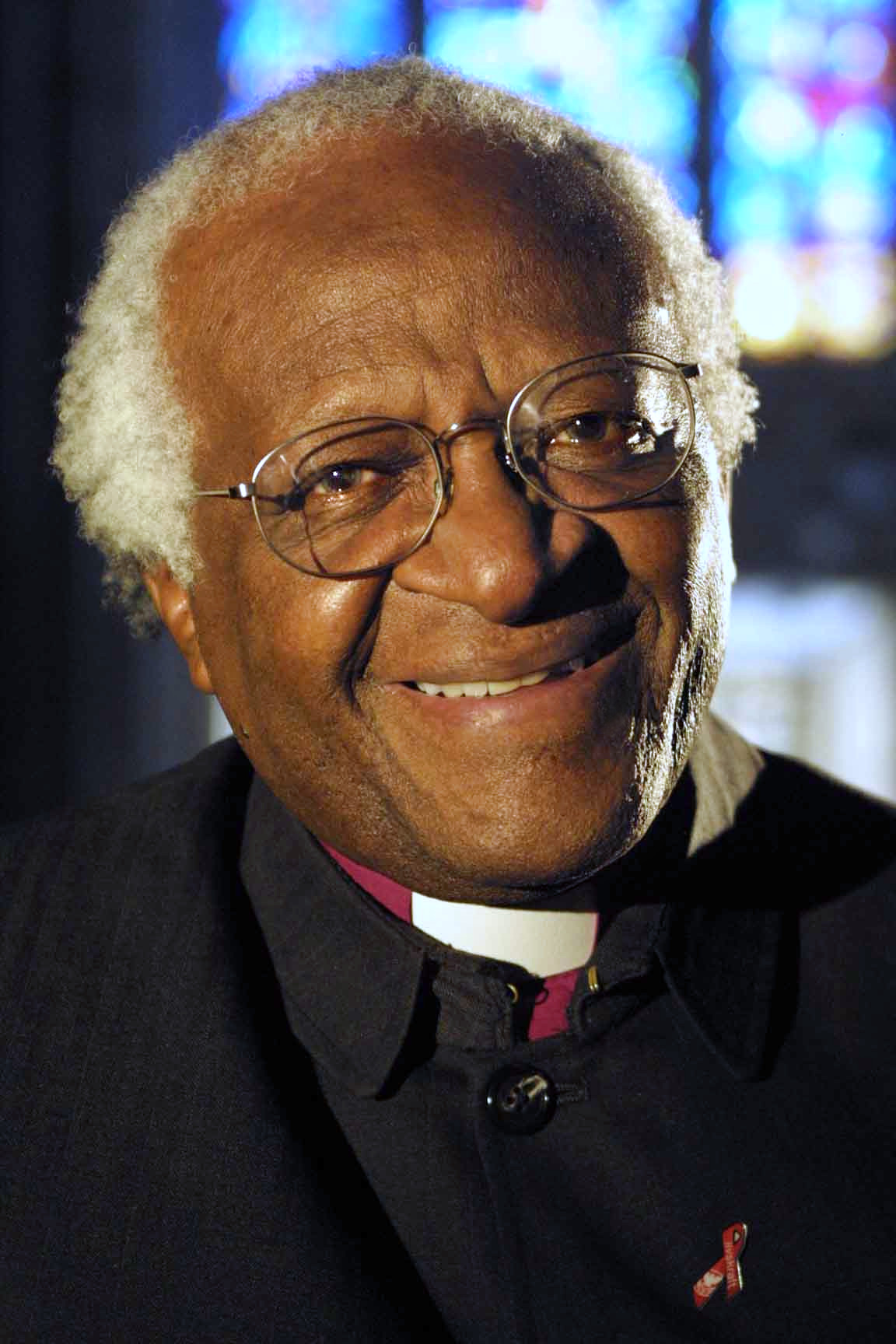
Desmond Tutu, South African social rights activist, recipient of 1984 Nobel Peace Prize for opposition to Apartheid (professor)

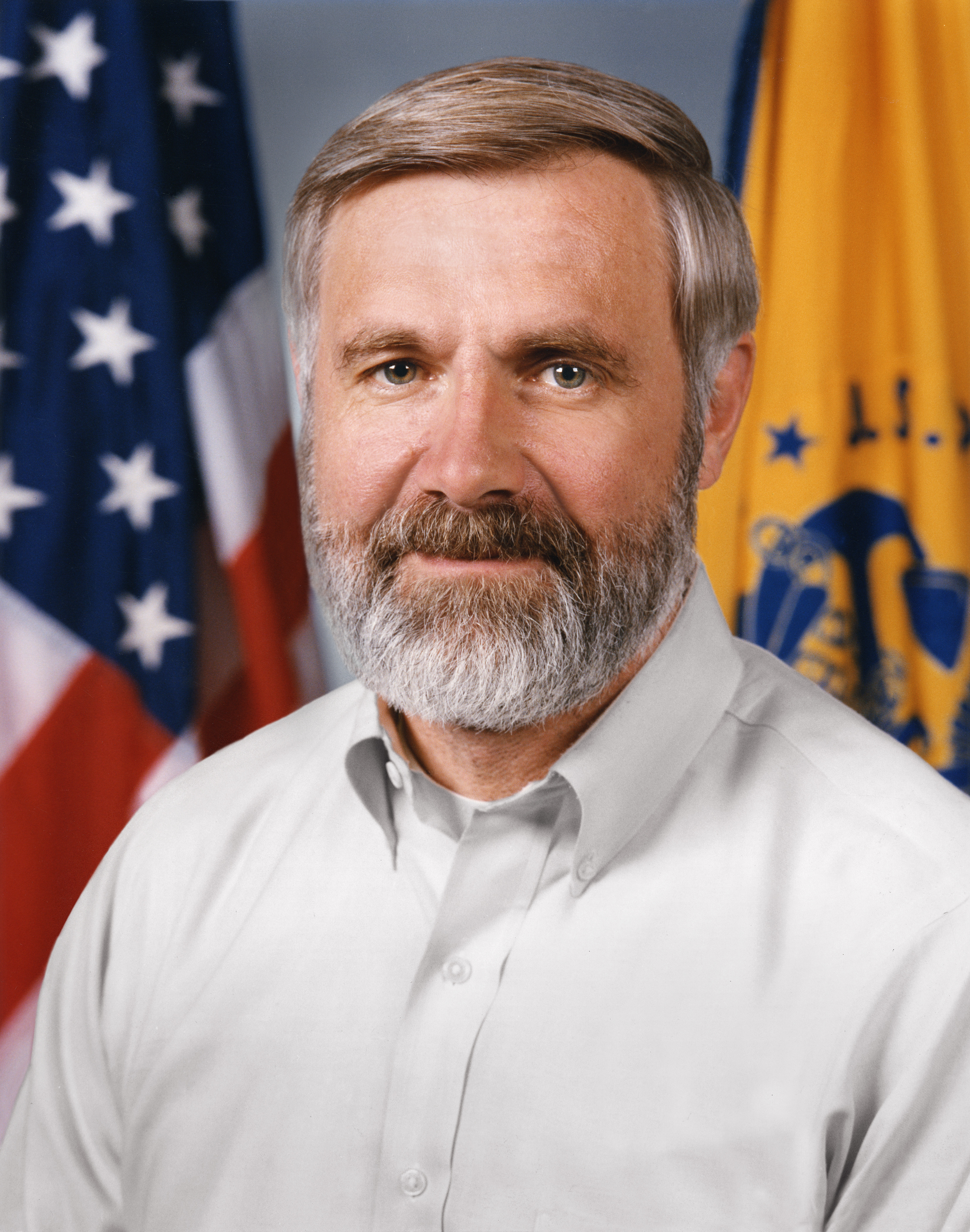
William Foege, tenth Centers for Disease Control and Prevention director, credited with global eradication of smallpox (professor)

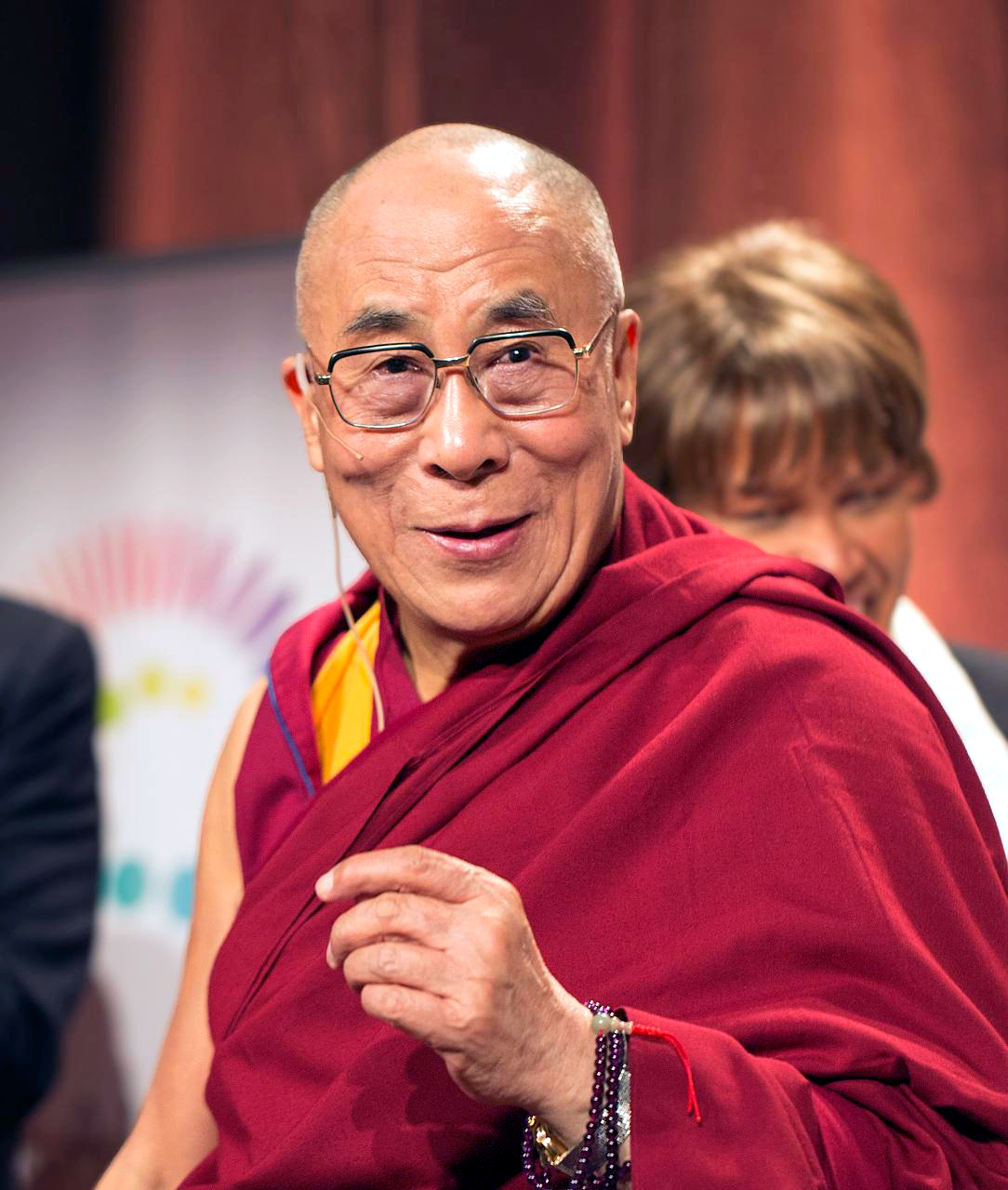
Tenzin Gyatso, 14th Dalai Lama, recipient of 1989 Nobel Peace Prize and Congressional Gold Medal in 2007 (professor)

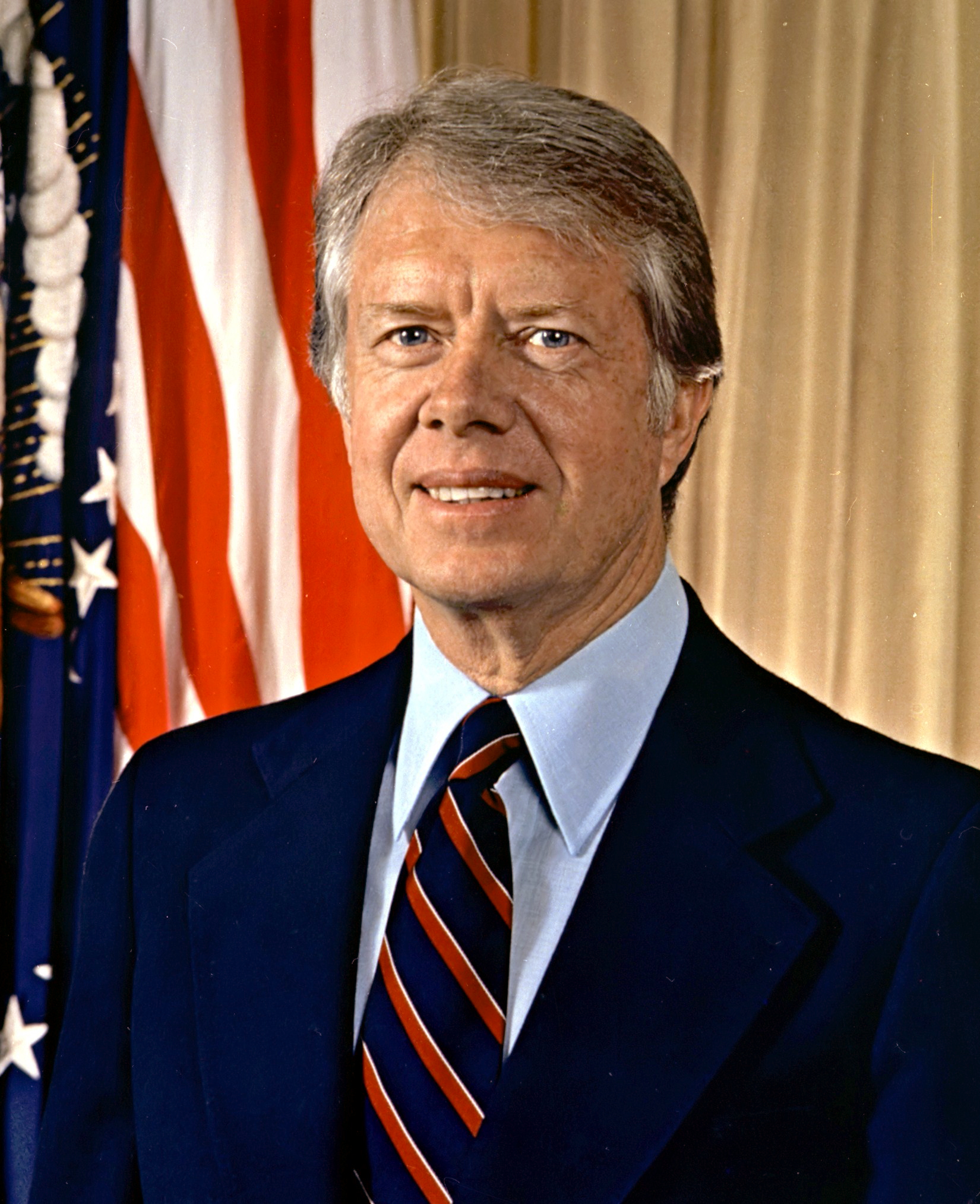
Jimmy Carter, 39th president of the United States, recipient of 2002 Nobel Peace Prize (professor)
