= Emory College =

Emory College may refer to:

- Emory College, an academic division of Emory University, located in DeKalb County, Georgia, USA, in the Atlanta area
- Oxford College of Emory University, a two-year residential college of Emory University located in Oxford, Georgia, USA.
