= Oxford Historic District (Oxford, Georgia) =

Historic district in Georgia, United States

- U.S. National Register of Historic Places
- U.S. Historic district
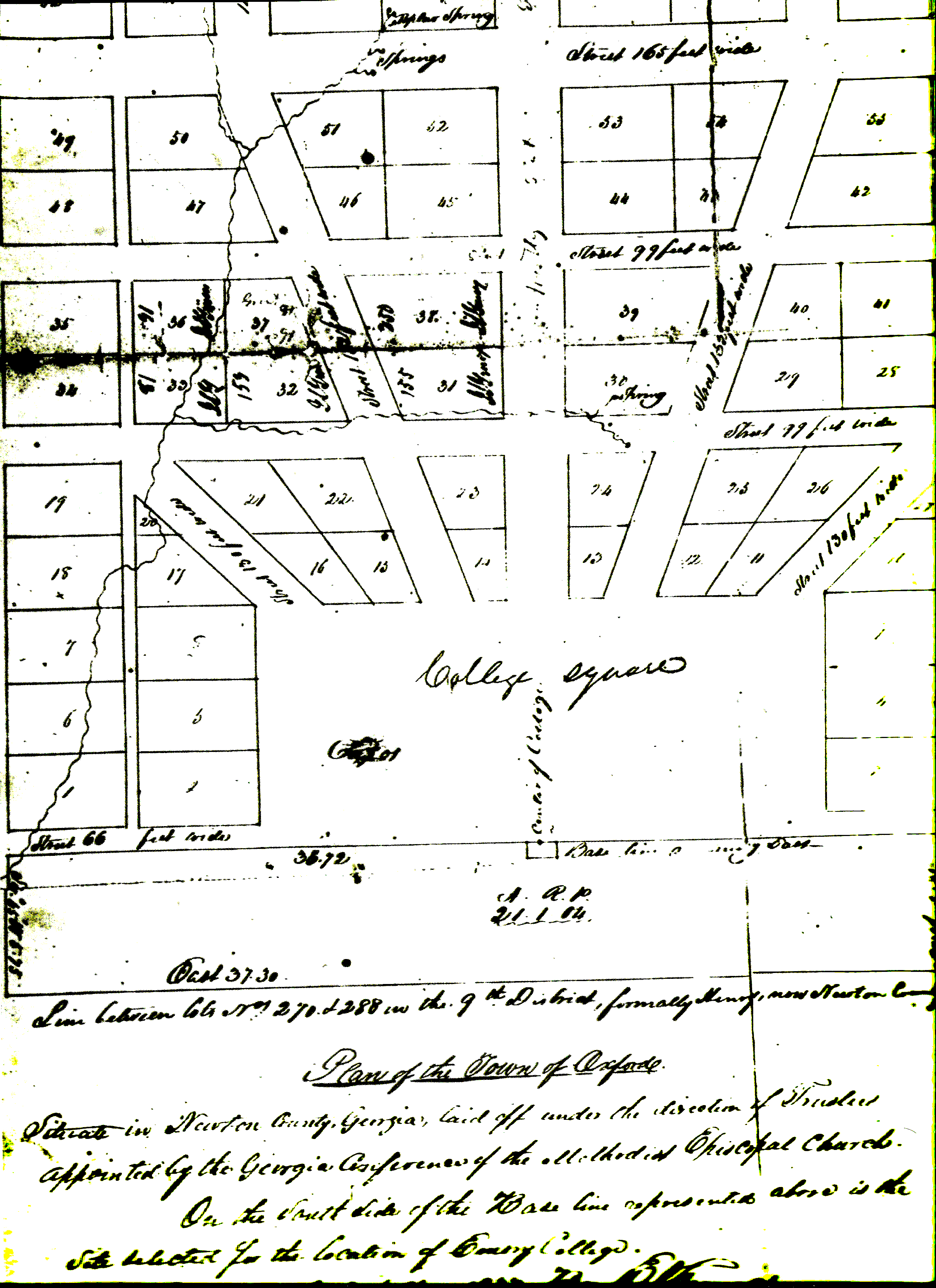
- Original design of Oxford, Georgia by Edward Thomas in 1837.

- Location within Georgia Location within the United States
- Location: College and residential district centered around Wesley St., Oxford, Georgia
- Area: 146 acres (59 ha)
- Architect: Thomas, Edward Lloyd
- Architectural style: Renaissance, Greek Revival, Gothic
- NRHP reference No.: 75000603
- Added to NRHP: June 5, 1975

The Oxford Historic District in Oxford, Georgia is a 146-acre (59 ha) historic district that was listed on the U.S. National Register of Historic Places (NRHP) in 1975. It includes Renaissance, Greek Revival, and Gothic architecture amidst 23 contributing buildings, one being Orna Villa, which is separately NRHP-listed. It also includes two contributing sites and one other contributing structure. The boundaries of the district today includes all of Oxford College of Emory University, the "Old Church", two cemeteries, two commercial establishments, and many residences built by Emory College-related people.

The contributing structures on the college campus include Seney Hall, Language Hall, the "Old Gym", the Prayer Chapel, Candler Hall, Haygood Hall, Few Hall, Pierce Hall, Phi Gamma Hall, a Confederate cemetery, and the Allen Memorial Church. A marble shaft monument in the center of the quad dedicated by the Masonic Lodge of Georgia to Emory's first President Ignatius Alphonso Few is a contributing monument. Other contributing structures in the residential neighborhood include the Oxford Cemetery, the Old Church, and houses built by Emory College's founders.

Contributing Buildings and Monuments

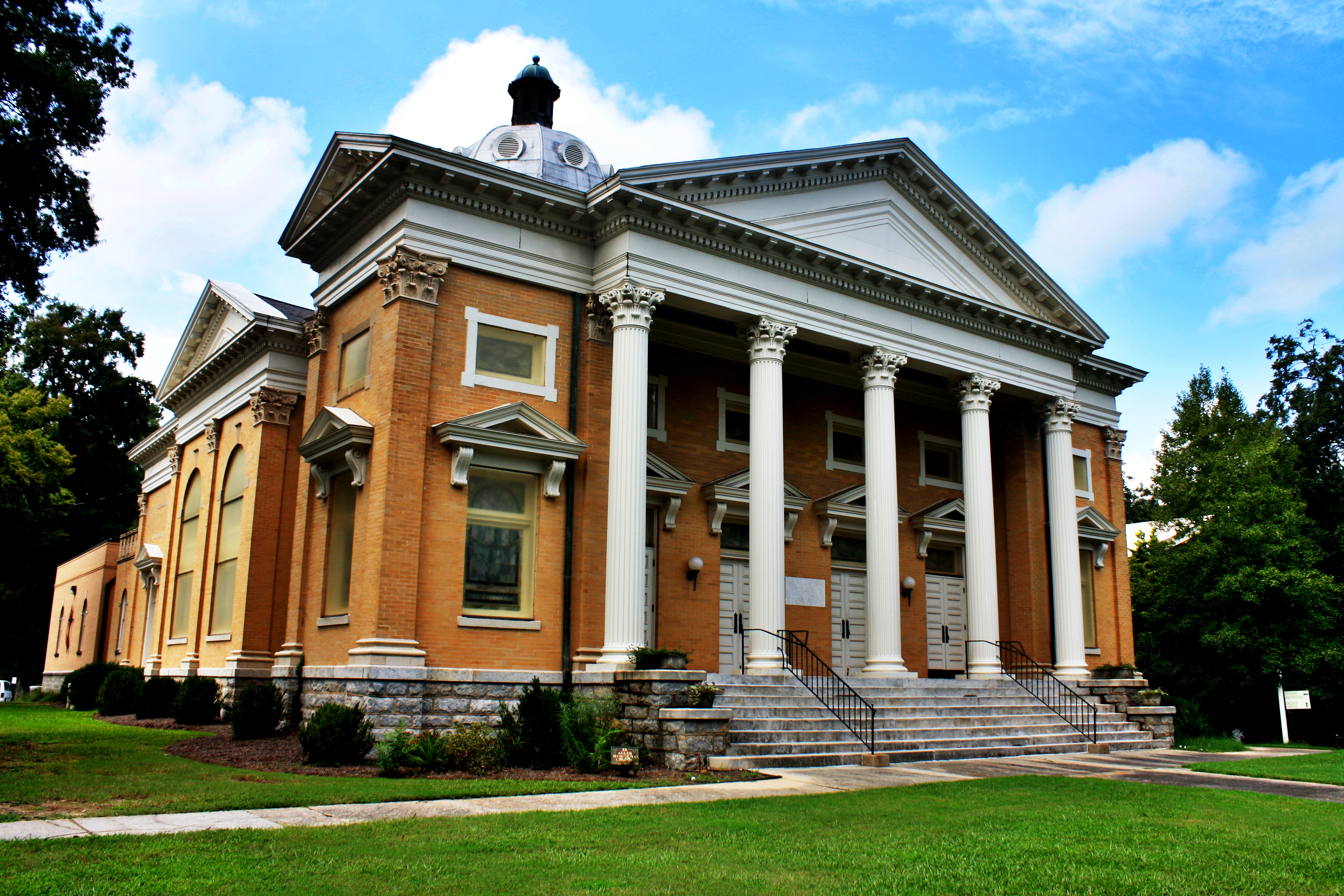
The Young J. Allen Jr. Memorial Church

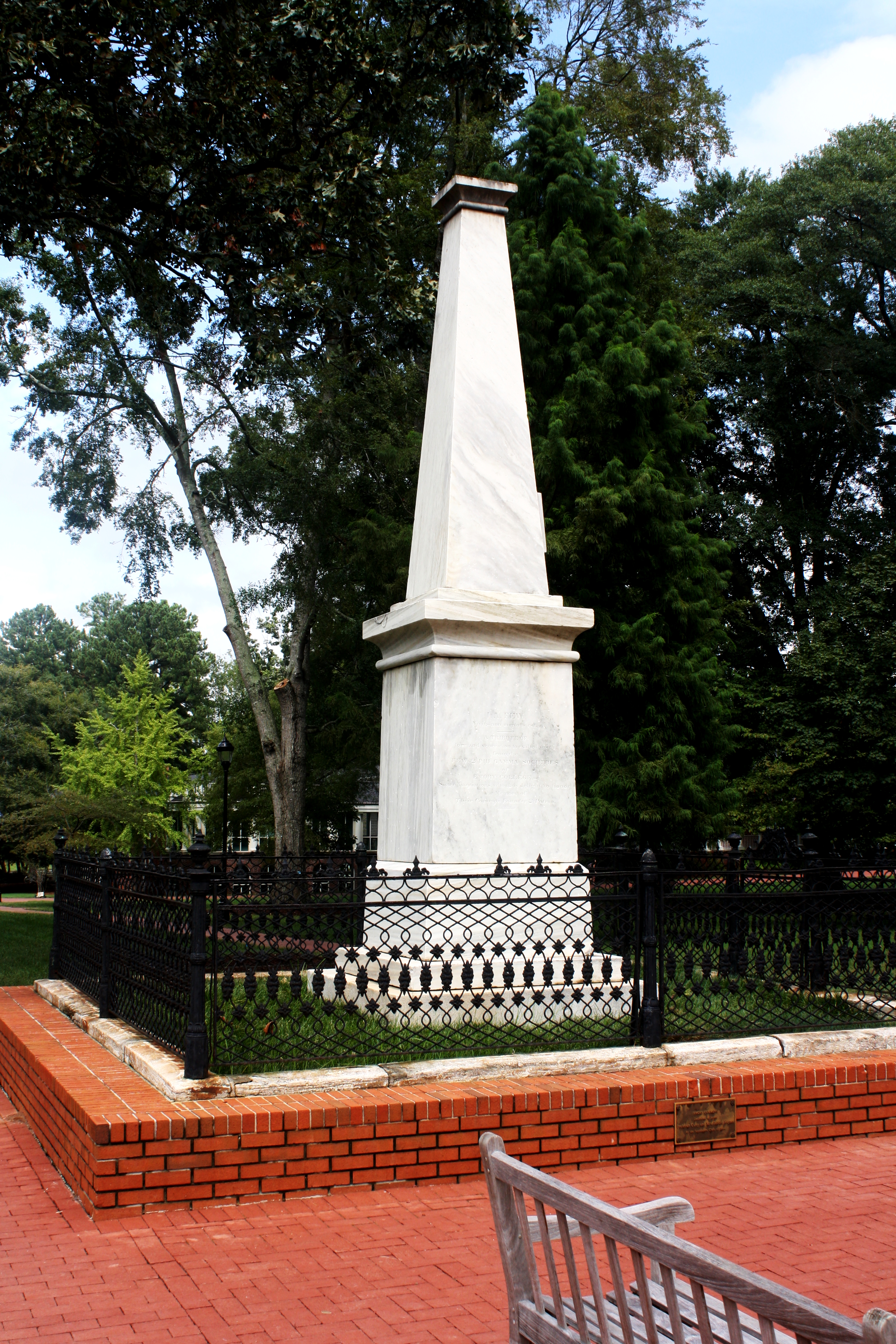
Few Monument

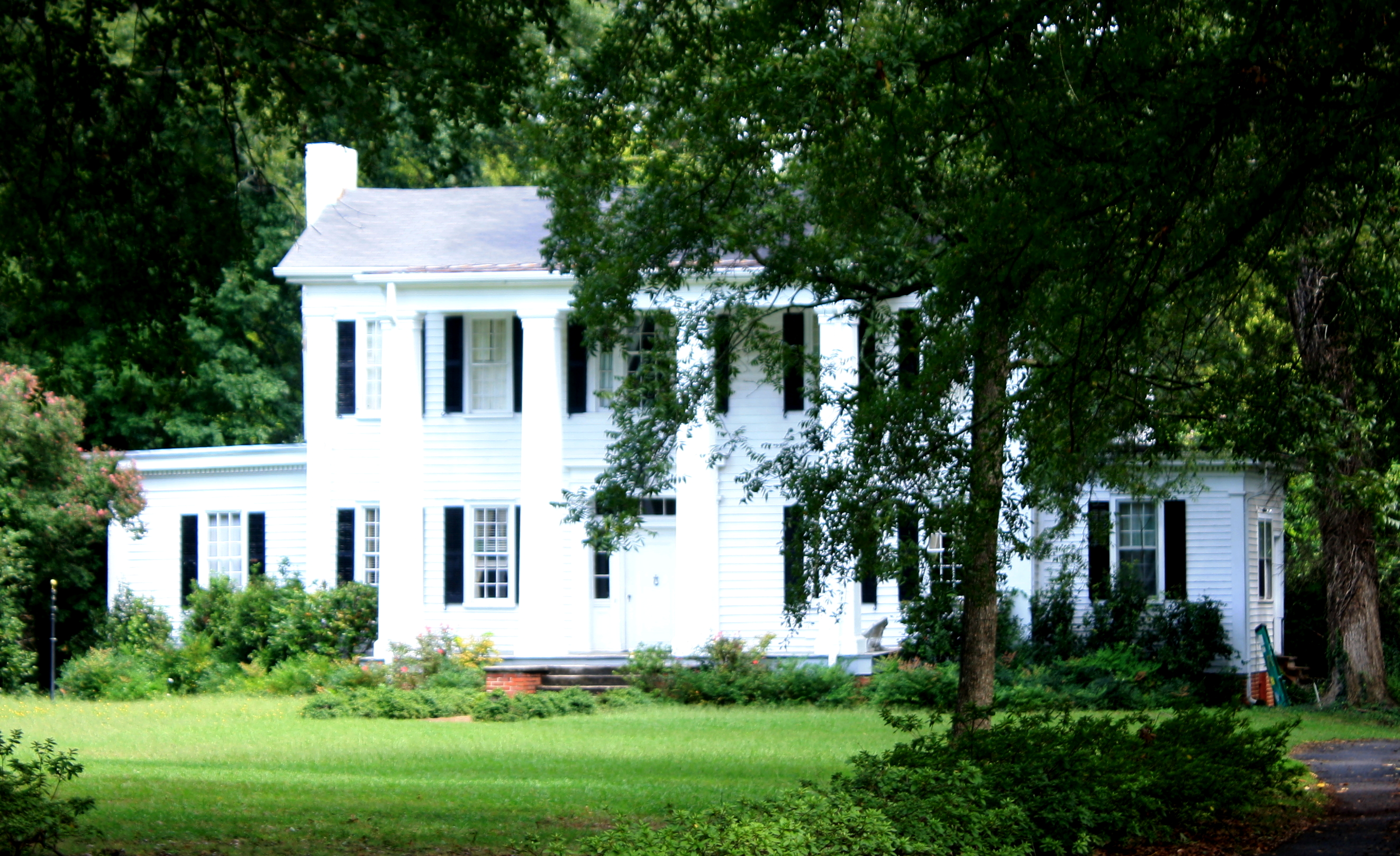
The Orna Villa House

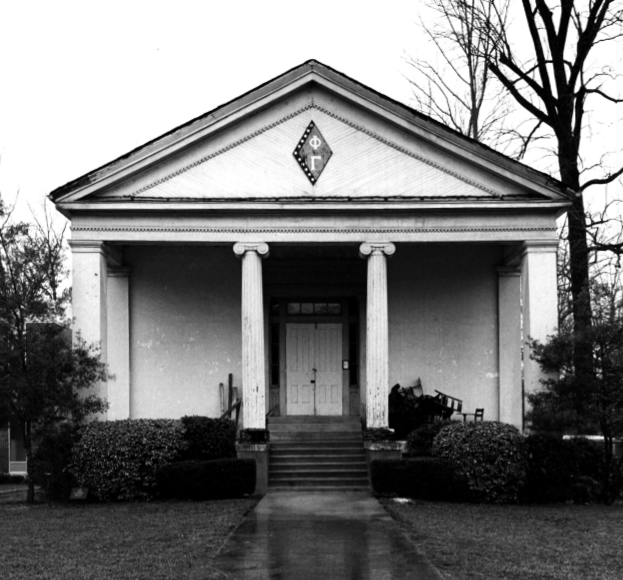
Phi Gamma Hall

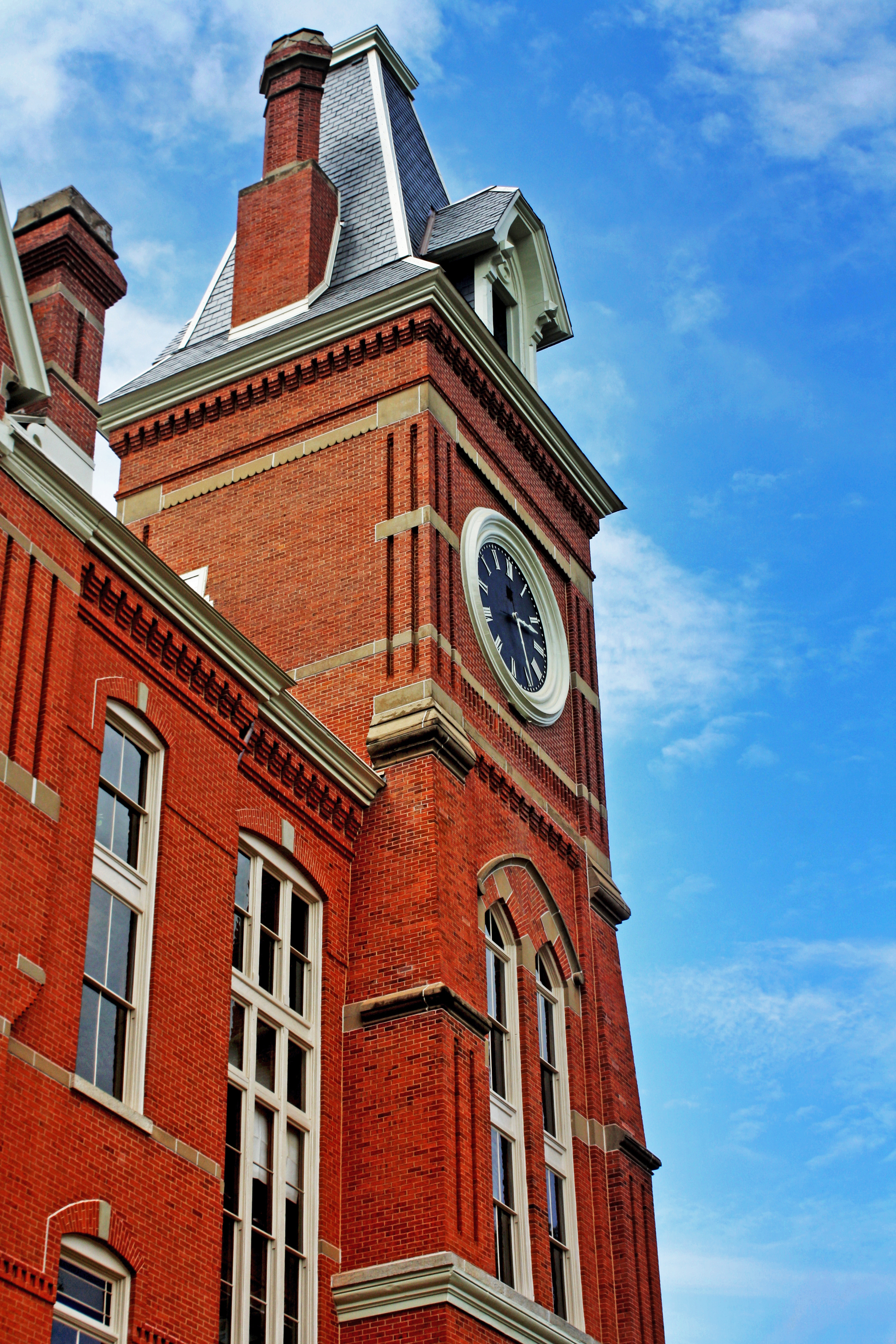
Seney Hall
