= Orna Villa =

Historic house in Georgia, United States

- U.S. National Register of Historic Places
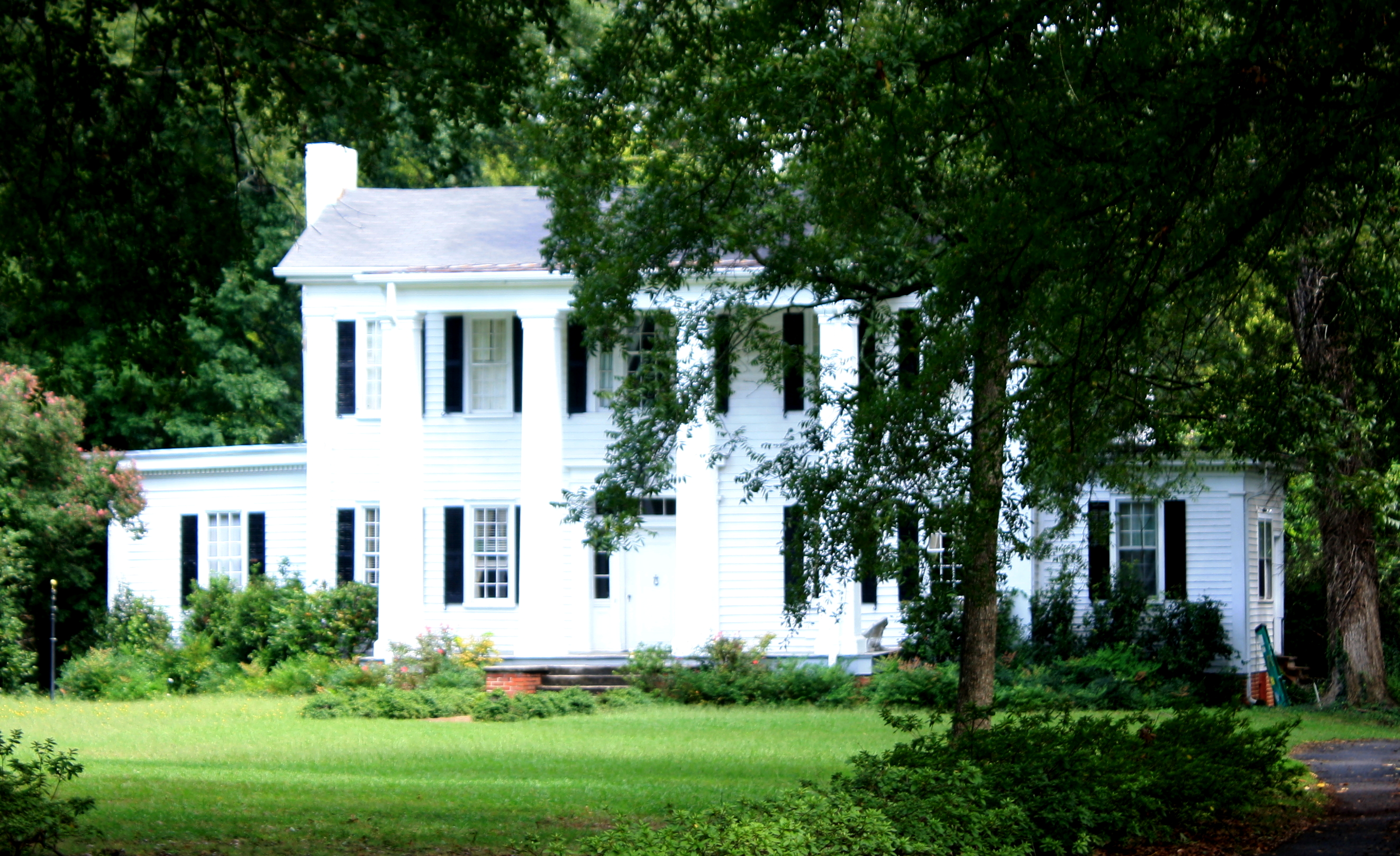

- Location within Georgia Location within the United States
- Location: 1008 N. Emory St., Oxford, Georgia
- Coordinates: 33.62408°N 83.86641°W
- Area: 1.8 acres (0.73 ha)
- Built: 1825
- Architect: Richard K. Dearing
- Architectural style: Greek Revival
- NRHP reference No.: 73000636
- Added to NRHP: January 29, 1973

Orna Villa, also known as the Alexander Means House and the Means/Tanner House, is a historic Greek Revival house located on Emory Street in Oxford, Georgia. Built in 1825, it is the oldest house in Oxford. The house is a work of Richard K. Dearing.

The home was owned for a time by Alexander Means, a founder and president of Emory College (the original site of which is now Oxford College of Emory University) and was used as a hospital during the American Civil War. The house has been featured in works on haunted houses because of its alleged association with the ghost of Tobe Means. The house was listed on the National Register of Historic Places (NRHP) in 1973. Orna Villa was the location of a college frat party in The Vampire Diaries.

It is a contributing building within the Oxford Historic District which also is NRHP-listed.
