= Edward Lloyd Thomas =

Confederate Army officer in the American Civil War

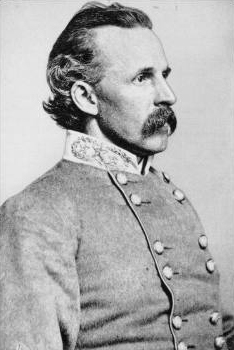
- Edward L. Thomas
- Born: March 23, 1825; Clarke County, Georgia
- Died: March 8, 1898 (aged 72); McAlester, Oklahoma
- Burial place: Kiowa, Oklahoma
- Military career
- Allegiance: United States of America; Confederate States of America
- Branch: United States Army; Confederate States Army
- Service years: 1847–48 (USA); 1861–65 (CSA)
- Rank: Brigadier General
- Commands: 35th Georgia Infantry; Thomas's Brigade, ANV
- Conflicts: Mexican–American War; American Civil War: Battle of Beaver Dam Creek; Seven Days Battles; Second Battle of Bull Run; Battle of Antietam; Battle of Fredericksburg; Battle of Chancellorsville; Battle of Gettysburg; Overland Campaign; Siege of Petersburg; Appomattox Campaign
- Other work: planter, Land Bureau, Indian Bureau agent

Edward Lloyd Thomas (March 23, 1825 – March 8, 1898) was a Confederate brigadier general of infantry during the American Civil War from the state of Georgia. He was colonel of the 35th Georgia Infantry Regiment, assigned to Joseph R. Anderson's brigade, which became part of A.P. Hill's famed "Light Division". When Anderson left to take control of the Tredegar Iron Works in Richmond, Thomas was promoted to brigadier general to command the brigade. He retained this position for the rest of the war and was present at all of the major battles of the Army of Northern Virginia.

Thomas was a graduate of Oxford College of Emory University and served in the Mexican–American War. He was an uncle to famed Old West lawman Heck Thomas, who helped bring down the Doolin–Dalton Gang.

== Early life ==
Thomas was born in Clarke County, Georgia, to Mary Thomas (née Hogue) and Edward Lloyd Thomas (surveyor) through whom he was descended from Edmund Thomas of Glamorgan. Edward Lloyd Thomas was the youngest of eleven children. He was a graduate of Oxford College of Emory University and served in the Mexican–American War from May 1847 until August 1848 as a second lieutenant in an independent company of Georgia mounted men. Before serving he farmed in Whitfield County, Georgia. Three of his brothers were Confederate officers: Henry Philip Thomas (b. 1810), a colonel in the 16th Regiment of Georgia, was killed in battle at Fort Sanders in Knoxville, Tennessee, in 1863; Lovick Pierce Thomas, I (1812–1878), captain and quartermaster of the 35th Georgia Infantry, resigned in 1863 due to injury; and Wesley Wailes Thomas (1820–1906) served as a major in Phillip's Legion of Cavalry.

== Civil War ==
In October 1861, Thomas became colonel of the 35th Georgia Infantry. The regiment was attached to Brigadier General Joseph R. Anderson's brigade, which was initially stationed in Georgia but during the Peninsula Campaign was sent to the Richmond area to reinforce Joe Johnston's army. On May 27, 1862, the brigade was added to the newly created division of Major General A.P. Hill, soon to be known as the "Light Division". While commanding the regiment, Thomas suffered a minor wound at the Battle of Beaver Dam Creek (Mechanicsville) during the Seven Days Battles. Anderson was wounded at Glendale and afterwards resigned his commission to manage the Tredegar Iron Works in Richmond. Thomas then became permanent commander of the brigade, and on November 1 he was promoted to brigadier general, participating in all of the major battles and campaigns fought by the Army of Northern Virginia.

When division commander William D. Pender was mortally wounded at Gettysburg, the two ranking brigade commanders left in the division were Thomas and James H. Lane. Although both had been promoted to brigadier general the same day (November 1, 1862), Lane had received his colonel's commission in September 1861, a month before Thomas had become a colonel, and thus Lane outranked him and assumed temporary command of the division. It has been suggested that as a Georgian, Thomas was not favored in a division with two North Carolina brigades. He remained in command of his brigade until the Confederate surrender at Appomattox Court House in 1865.

== Postbellum career ==
After the war, Thomas returned to Georgia and farmed in Newton County near Covington. In 1885, President Grover Cleveland appointed him to a position as a Special Agent of the Land Bureau in Kansas. Later he was made Indian Agent at the Sac and Fox Agency, Indian Territory, Oklahoma. After being in poor health for some time, Thomas died on March 8, 1898, in South McAlester, Indian Territory, and is buried in Kiowa, Oklahoma.

== See also ==
- List of American Civil War generals (Confederate)
