= James Edward Dickey =

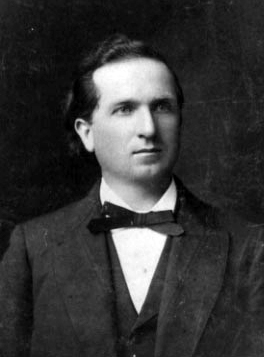
James Edward Dickey

James Edward Dickey (1864 – 1928) was an American bishop of the Methodist Episcopal Church, South, elected in 1922.

== Birth and family ==
James was born 11 May 1864 in Jeffersonville, Georgia, the son of the Rev. James Madison and Ann Elizabeth (Thomas) Dickey. He was a descendant of John Dickey, who emigrated from Derry, Ireland in 1753. Another ancestor was an English settler in Maryland. Both James' parents were of Revolutionary stock.

James married Jessie Munroe 9 September 1891. They had children Julia, Annie, Jessie, Claire, Edna, and James Edward, Jr.

== Education ==
James was educated in the Atlanta, Gainesville and Elbertson schools. He earned an A.B. degree from Emory College in Oxford, Georgia, class of 1891. He was a member of the Chi Phi fraternity.

== Ordained and academic ministry ==
James joined the Itinerant Ministry of the North Georgia Annual Conference of the M.E. Church, South in 1891. He was an adjunct professor of Mental and Moral Science at Emory College, beginning in 1891. Then, he was appointed the Alumni Professor of Historical and Political Economics in 1896. He then spent time in the pastorate, appointed to Grace M.E., South Church in Atlanta in 1899.

The Rev. Dr. Dickey then had the honor as the last President of Emory College, and the first President of Emory University. His term as President was 1902 to 1915. He then served again as a Pastor, this time of First Methodist at 42 E. Third St., Atlanta.

Rev. Dickey also was a member of the Ecumenical Conference at Toronto in 1911. He was also elected the General Secretary of Education for his denomination in 1910, bet resigned to remain at Emory. He was elected a delegate to the 1910 General Conference of the M.E. Church, South. He also served as the Chairman of the Board of Missions of his Annual Conference.

== Episcopal ministry ==
The Rev. Dr. James Edward Dickey was elected to the Episcopacy of the M.E. Church, South at the 1922 General Conference. As Bishop, he served as a Trustee of Emory and of Wesleyan Female College.

Bishop Dickey died 17 April after an appendectomy operation in Louisville, Kentucky. He was buried in Westview Cemetery in Atlanta.

== Biography ==
- Dempsey, E.F., Life of Bishop Dickey, 1937.

== See also ==
- List of bishops of the United Methodist Church
