= The Cliff (Emory) =

University shuttle system in Atlanta, Georgia, US

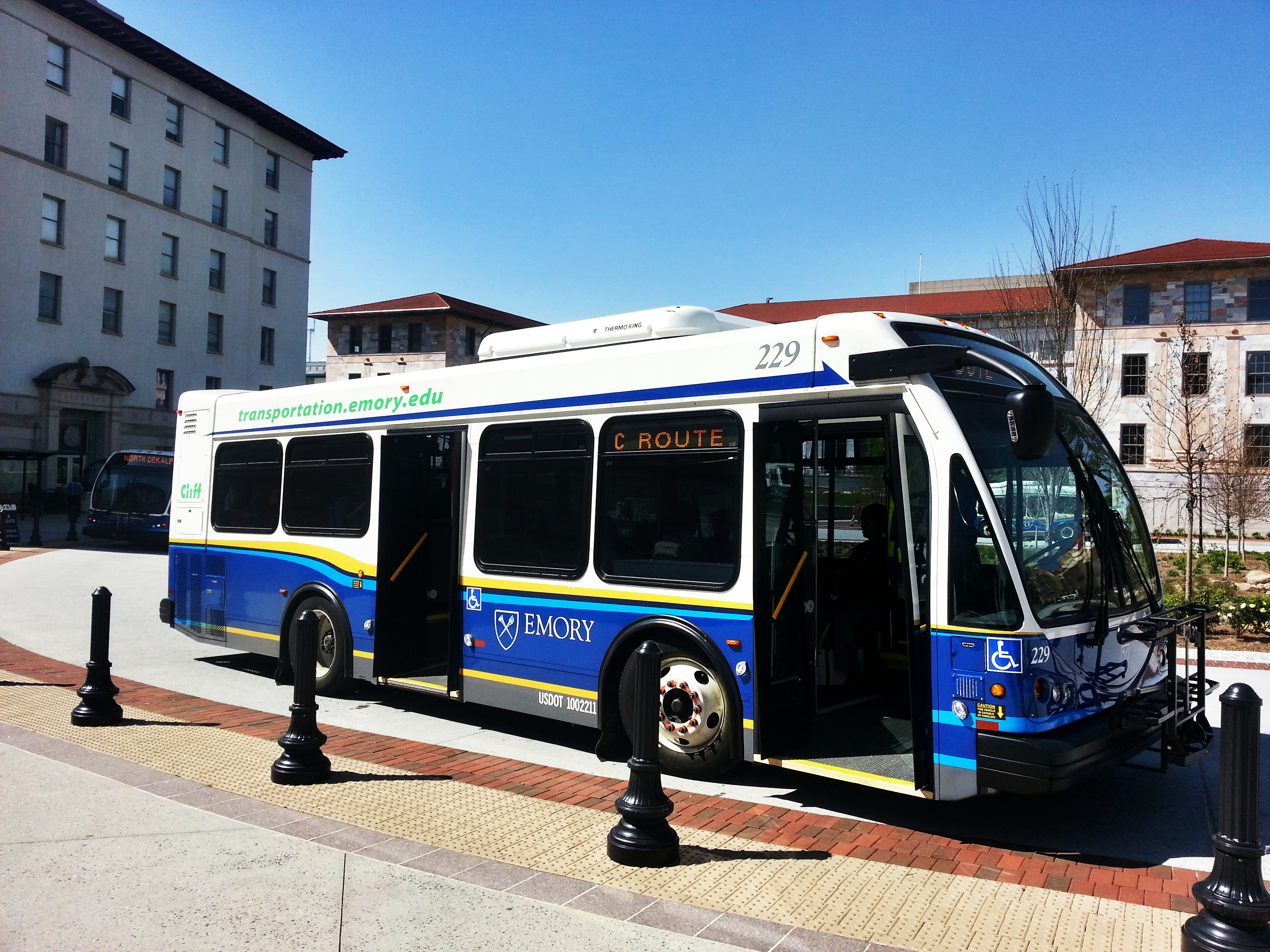
- The North Dekalb route shuttle parked at Woodruff Circle in Emory University.
- Parent: Emory University
- Headquarters: 1945 Starvine Way, Atlanta, GA
- Service area: Emory University campus
- Service type: fixed-route shuttle paratransit charter
- Operator: Transdev
- Website: transportation.emory.edu/shuttles

The Cliff is the shuttle system of Emory University's main Druid Hills campus in Atlanta.

The Cliff is the largest public transportation system in Atlanta other than MARTA. It consists of a fleet of 55 buses, all powered by biodiesel created from recycled cooking oil from the school's cafeteria. Most bus routes run in weekdays, while Route C, Toco Hills, and Oxford operates during the weekend. Emory SafeRide is also available during late nights, from 9 pm to 5 am.

As of 2008, average ridership was 200,000 trips per month; daily ridership averaged 2,300 for its park-n-ride routes. In 2010, the annual ridership was 2,593,851.

Woodruff Transit Circle is the biggest transfer point for the Emory Cliff, serving more than 10 routes.

As of December 2023, The Cliff operated 9 campus routes, 5 commuter routes (to Executive Park, Emory's Oxford Campus, South DeKalb Mall, Decatur, and Emory Decatur Hospital), 2 hospital routes including service to Grady and Emory Midtown Hospital; and 1 shopping route (service to the Toco Hills shopping center). Many of the routes also stop at transfer stations with MARTA.

== Emory Main Campus routes ==
=== Campus routes ===
Route	Stops	Service Hours	Frequency
A	Woodruff Cir > Haygood > Gatewood > 1525 Clifton Rd > 1599 Clifton Rd > Emory Point > Villa International > Wesley Woods > (Budd Terrace > WW Towers) > Geriatric Hospital > 1762 Clifton Rd > CDC Pkwy > Clifton Way > CDC > Nursing School > WHSCAB > Woodruff Cir	Mon-Fri 7:00B, 7:35, 8:05B, 8:40, 9:10B, 9:45, 10:15B, 10:50, 11:20B, 11:55, 12:25B, 13:00, 13:30B, 14:05, 14:35B, 15:10, 15:40B, 16:15, 16:45B, 17:20, 17:50B, 18:25, 18:55B, 19:30 (trips with B stops at Budd & WW)	
C	Starvine Deck > Clifton School > Health Sciences Research Bldg > Uppergate > CHOA > Woodruff Cir > Winship Cancer Institute > Ridgewood > Health Sciences Research Bldg > Starvine Way > Clifton School > Starvine Deck	Mon-Fri 5:00 - 23:40; Sat-Sun 8:30-23:45	Mon-Fri 2-20 min; Sat-Sun 15 min
D	Woodruff Cir > Complex > Woodruff Library > Mizell Bridge > FIshburne Ln > Dowman Dr > White Hall > Eagle Row > Dickey Dr > Woodruff PE Ctr > Peavine Deck > Peavine Creek Dr > 6 Eagle Row > Few Hall > Raoul Hall > Means Dr > WHSCAB > Woodruff Cir	Mon-Fri 5:00 - 15:30. No weekend service.	10 min
E	Starvine Deck > Clifton School > Health Sciences Research Bldg > Uppergate > Gambrell Dr > N Decatur Building > Gambrell > Law School > Clifton > Winship Cancer Institute > Ridgewood > Health Sciences Research Bldg > Starvine Way > Clifton School > Starvine Deck	Mon-Fri 5:00 - 9:00; 14:30 - 20:30. No weekend service.	12-15 min
M	Michael St > Houston Mill > Nursing School > WHSCAB > Woodruff Cir > Inner Loop (Winship Cancer Institute > Ridgewood > Gambrell Dr > N Decatur Building > Gambrell) OR Outer Loop (Gambrell > N Decatur Building > Gambrell Dr > Ridgewood > Winship Cancer Institute) > Clifton > Uppergate > Haygood > Gatewood > Rollins Way > Michael St	Mon-Fri 5:00 - 21:00. 5:00 - 15:00 Inner loop routing; 15:00 - 21:00 outer loop routing. No weekend service.	15-20 min
Loop	Starvine Deck > Clifton School > Health Sciences Research Bldg > Gambrell Dr > N Decatur Building > Gambrell > J Tower > Clifton > Complex > Woodruff Library > Mizell Bridge > FIshburne Ln > Dowman Dr > White Hall > Eagle Row > Dickey Dr > Woodruff PE Ctr > Peavine Deck > Peavine Creek Dr > 6 Eagle Row > Few Hall > Raoul Hall > Means Dr > WHSCAB > Woodruff Cir > Law School > Clinic Building B > Gambrell Deck > Uppergate > Health Sciences Research Bldg > Starvine Way > Clifton School > Starvine Deck	Mon-Fri 7:00 - 0:00 No weekend service.	10-20 min
DX	Woodruff Cir > Depot > Sorority Lodges > Peavine Deck > Woodruff PE Ctr > Peavine Creek Dr > 6 Eagle Row > Few Hall > Raoul Hall > Means Dr > Woodruff Cir	Mon-Fri 15:30 - 21:00. No weekend service.	10 min
BX	Woodruff Cir > Haygood > Gatewood > 1525 Clifton Rd > 1599 Clifton Rd > Emory Point > Campus Crossing Apts > Johnson Rd NE > CDC Pkwy > Nursing School > WHSCAB > Woodruff Cir	Mon-Fri 7:15 - 23:55. Campus Crossing Apts start service from 7:00; 23:55 trip terminates at Campus Crossing Apts. No weekend service.	15-30 min
SafeRide	On demand shuttle. Request service from any place on campus to any place on campus.	21:00 - 5:00.	Request only

=== Commuter routes ===
Route	Stops	Service Hours	Frequency
Executive Park	Exec Park Dr S > Exec Park Dr Bldg 6 > Sports Medicine > Marquis > Hopkins Terrace > Briar Patch > Southland Vista Shopping > Briar Vista Terrace > Marcus Inst > Old Briarcliff Way > 1762 Clifton Rd > CDC Pkwy > Clifton Way > CDC > Nursing School > WHSCAB > Woodruff Cir > Haygood > Gatewood > 1525 Clifton Rd > 1599 Clifton Rd > Emory Point > Villa International > Wesley Woods > Atlantic Briarcliff > Briar Vista Terrace > Post Briarcliff > Hampton Hall Apts > Ashford at Druid Hills Apts > Hawthorne North Druid Hills Apts > Exec Park W > Exec Park Dr S	Mon-Fri 7:00 - 21:20. 9:30 & 11:15 trip terminates at Woodruff Cir; 14:00 trip originates at Woodruff Cir. No weekend service.	7:00 - 10:15 (15-30 min); 11:00; 11:15; 12:00; 13:00; 14:00-18:30 (15-30 min); 19:20; 20:00; 20:40; 21:20.
Oxford/Emory	Woodruff Cir > Oxford College Transportation Hub > Woodruff Cir	Mon 6:30, 9:15, 12:00, 15:00, 16:30, 17:45, 20:15, 22:45; Tue-Thu 6:30, 9:30, 12:00, 15:00, 16:30, 17:45, 20:15, 22:45; Fri 6:30, 9:30, 12:00, 15:00, 16:30, 17:45, 20:15, 21:30, 22:45; Sat 0:00, 1:15, 2:30, 3:45, 12:00, 13:15, 15:00, 15:45, 16:30, 17:45, 20:15, 21:30, 22:45; Sun 0:00, 1:15, 2:30, 3:45, 7:00, 9:30, 12:00, 16:30, 20:15, 22:45	
South DeKalb Mall	AM: South DeKalb Mall > Tupelo > Midway > Agnes Scott > Michigan Ave > Maediris Dr > Clairmont > Healthgate Dr > Emory School of Law > Woodruff Cir PM: Woodruff Cir > FIshburne > Healthgate Dr > Madeiras > Scott Blvd > Wilton > Agnes Scott > Midway > Memorial > Glenwood > McAfee > South DeKalb Mall	Mon-Fri DeKalb 5:25, 5:55, 6:30, 6:55, 7:40, 8:15, 8:55; Woodruff 14:30, 15:00, 15:40, 16:10, 16:55, 17:25, 18:10, 18:40, 19:20, 19:50. No weekend service.	
CCTMA	Decatur MARTA > #2 Decatur Bldg > Clairemont Oaks > Michigan Ave > Maediris Dr > Clairmont > Haygood > Healthgate Dr > Emory School of Law > Uppergate > Haygood > Gatewood > 1525 Clifton Rd > 1599 Clifton Rd > 1599 Cir Entrance > ECCH > CDC > Nursing School > WHSCAB > Woodruff Cir > Fishburne > Healthgate Dr > Haygood > Clairemont Ave > Madeiras > Scott Blvd > Wilton > Clairemont Oaks > Decatur MARTA	Mon-Fri 5:30 - 20:15. 9:40, 18:15, 20:15 trip terminates at ECCH; 14:35 trip originates at ECCH. No weekend service.	5:30 - 10:00 (15-25 min); 10:50, 11:35, 12:20, 13:05, 13:50; 14:35 - 16:00 (25-30 min); 16:35, 17:10, 17:45, 18:15, 18:45, 19:35, 20:15.

=== Hospital routes ===
Route	Stops	Service Hours	Frequency
Emory Decatur Hospital	Emory Decatur Hospital > Medlock Plaza > Superior > Webster Dr > Clairmont > Healthgate Dr > Emory School of Law > Woodruff Cir > Fishburne > Healthgate Dr > Clairemont Ave > Publix > Superior > Scott > Wash Lively > Emory Decatur Hospital	Mon-Fri 5:45 - 20:15. No weekend service.	5:45 - 9:55 (15-25 min); 10:45, 11:35, 12:25, 13:15, 14:05-16:15 (25-30 min); 16:50, 17:20, 18:00, 19:00, 19:40, 20:15.
EUH Midtown	Woodruff Cir > Fishburne > Briarcliff Campus > EUHM Conservatory Entrance > Ivan Allen Jr Blvd > W Peachtree > Civic Center MARTA > EUHM Peachtree Bldg > Briarcliff Campus > Emory School of Law > Woodruff Cir	Mon-Fri 6:10, 7:10, 8:10, 9:10, 10:10, 11:10, 12:10, 13:10, 14:10, 15:10, 16:10, 17:10, 18:10, 19:10. No weekend service.	
Grady Memorial Hospital	Grady Hospital > Emory School of Law > Woodruff Cir > Fishburne > Grady Hospital	Mon-Fri 6:10, 7:10, 8:10, 9:10, 10:10, 11:10, 12:10, 13:10, 14:10, 15:10, 16:10, 17:10, 18:10 (terminates at Woodruff Cir). No weekend service.	

=== Shopping route ===
Route	Stops	Service Hours	Frequency
Toco Hill	Starvine Deck > S Fork Peachtree Creek > Toco Hill > S Fork Peachtree Creek > Dooley Dr > Starvine Deck	Sat & Sun 11:00 - 18:40. No weekday service.	20 min

== Emory Oxford College routes ==
Emory's Oxford College campus has three shuttles serving surrounding areas, including Covington, Conyers, and Duluth. Students are required to reserve a seat with the Oxford Shuttle app to ride.

Route	Stops	Service Hours
Newton Plaza	Oxford College > Pubilx > Walmart > Newton Plaza > Oxford College	Mon, Wed, Fri 19:45, 20:23, 20:59. No weekend service.
Conyers Commons	Oxford College > Covington Square > Conyers Commons > Oxford College	Tue & Thu 17:00, 18:20, 19:40. No weekend service.
AMC Conyers	Oxford College > AMC Conyers > Oxford College	Sat 18:00, 18:50, 19:40. No service on weekdays/Sun.
H Mart Duluth	Oxford College > H Mart Duluth > Oxford College	Only operate on the first Sunday of the month: 14:00, 17:00.

== Fleet ==
Fleet number	Image	Year	Manufacturer	Model	Engines	Transmission
241-243		2014	Ford	E-350	Ford Modular 6.8L V10 Gasoline	
244-249		2018	Ford	E-450	Ford Modular 6.8L V10 Gasoline	
301-305		2023	ElDorado National	E-Z Rider II BRT 35'	Cummins L9 EPA21	Allison B300R
306-310		2023	ElDorado National	E-Z Rider II BRT 30'	Cummins B6.7 EPA21	Allison B300R
401-409		2024	Gillig	BRT 35'	Cummins L9 EPA24	Allison B400R
410-424		2024	Gillig	BRT 29'	Cummins L9 EPA24	Allison B300R
501-506		2025	Gillig	Gillig Low Floor EV 35'	BAE Systems Series-EV	BAE Systems HDS200
