= Colored Cemetery =

Historic Cemetery in Columbus, Georgia, US

- U.S. National Register of Historic Places
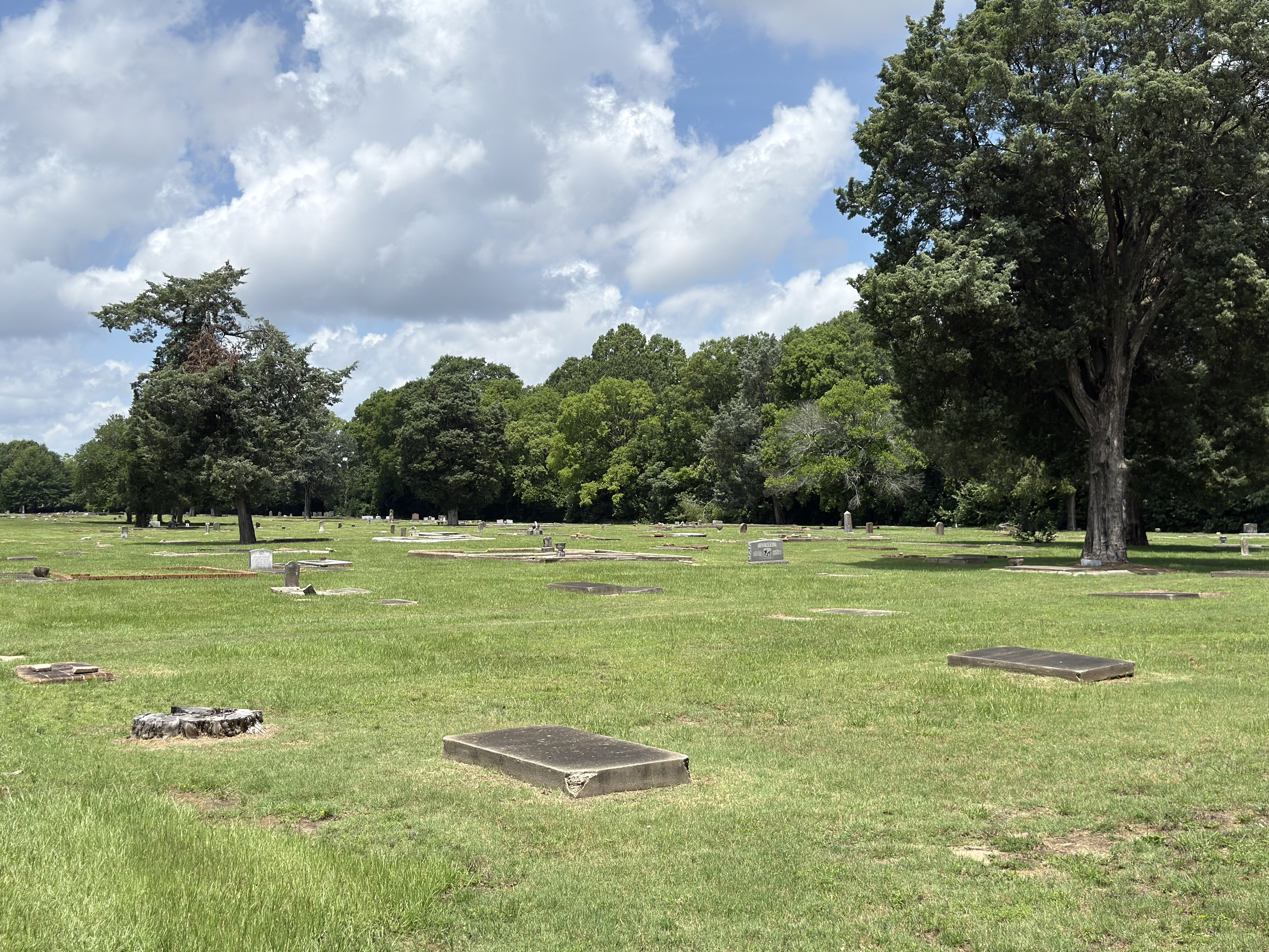
- The north side of the older section of the cemetery.

- Location within Georgia Location within the United States
- Location: 10th Ave. Columbus, Georgia
- Coordinates: 32.453°N 84.982°W
- Area: 17.6 acres (7.1 ha)
- Built: c. 1845
- MPS: Columbus MRA
- NRHP reference No.: 80001155
- Added to NRHP: September 29, 1980

The Colored Cemetery on 10th Avenue in Columbus, Georgia, is a 17.6-acre (7.1 ha) cemetery used by African-American citizens of Columbus that has burials dating back to at least the 1840s. In 1936, the name Porterdale Cemetery began to be used also. It is believed to have been included in the 1828 plan for the city by surveyor Edward Lloyd Thomas.

The cemetery was listed on the National Register of Historic Places in 1980.

The name "Porterdale" for the cemetery is apparently in honor of Richard P. Porter, the cemetery's sexton from about 1878 to about 1920.

== See also ==
- Old City Cemetery, cemetery of whites in Columbus, also founded in 1828 and NRHP-listed
