= Oxford College of Emory University =

Residential college of Emory University in Oxford, Georgia, USA

Oxford College
- Former names: Emory College; Emory University Academy; Emory at Oxford
- Motto: Cor prudentis possidebit scientiam
- Motto in English: The wise heart seeks knowledge [Proverbs 18:15]
- Type: Private residential college
- Established: 1836; 190 years ago
- Parent institution: Emory University
- Religious affiliation: Methodist
- Dean: Badia Ahad
- Undergraduates: 993
- Location: Oxford, Georgia, United States; 33.619519°N 83.871045°W
- Campus: Small Town
- Colors: Blue and gold
- Mascot: Swoop the Eagle
- Website: www.oxford.emory.edu

Oxford College of Emory University (Oxford College) is a residential college of Emory University. Oxford College is located in Oxford, Georgia, on Emory University's original campus 38 miles (61 km) east of Emory's current Atlanta campus. It specializes in the foundations of liberal arts education. Students who enroll in Oxford College complete an associate of the arts degree there, after which they can continue their studies at Emory's Atlanta campus to pursue a bachelor degree without any additional applications.

Oxford College has an enrollment of nearly 1,000 freshman and sophomore students. Campus organizations include community service groups, interest clubs, and social clubs, the school's replacement for traditional fraternities and sororities. The college participates in NJCAA Division III sports, with the men's and women's tennis teams having won national championships multiple times. The university-wide unofficial mascot, a skeleton named "Lord Dooley", has its origins in the Oxford campus.

== History ==
=== Founding and early history ===
In 1833, the Georgia Methodist Conference considered establishing a church-sponsored manual labor school where students would combine farm work with a college preparatory curriculum. Two years later, the Conference opened the Georgia Conference Manual Labor School, but the institution soon faced financial challenges and disbanded. After the labor school's failure, the Conference granted Methodist preacher Ignatius Few a charter to establish a new college named after John Emory, a Methodist bishop who was involved in the labor school's founding but had died in a carriage accident before it opened. In 1836, the new school, Emory College, was established on a tract of land in Newton County, one mile north of Covington, Georgia. The site was chosen because of its distance from the city, which the school's founders feared would be a source of distraction for its students. The campus and the immediate surroundings were planned and built in 1837 by Edward Lloyd Thomas, a Georgia land surveyor who also planned the city of Columbus, Georgia. On 23 December 1839, the state legislature incorporated the city of Oxford, named after the alma mater of the founders of the Methodist movement, Charles and John Wesley, the University of Oxford. Because the college and town were founded only three years apart, many of the town's early residents were involved in the college's founding and continued to be involved in its daily activities.

On 17 September 1838, two years after the college's chartering, President Ignatius Few and three faculty members welcomed fifteen freshmen and sophomores into its inaugural class. To raise money to maintain the school, Few began selling lots around the college to local citizens. The founders envisaged a curriculum that would rest squarely on the classics and mathematics, with four years' study of Greek, Latin, and mathematics, and three years' study of the English Bible and the sciences of geography, astronomy, and chemistry. According to historian Henry M. Bullock, the founders intended Emory to be, "in the fullest sense of the term, a Christian college".

==== Literary societies ====
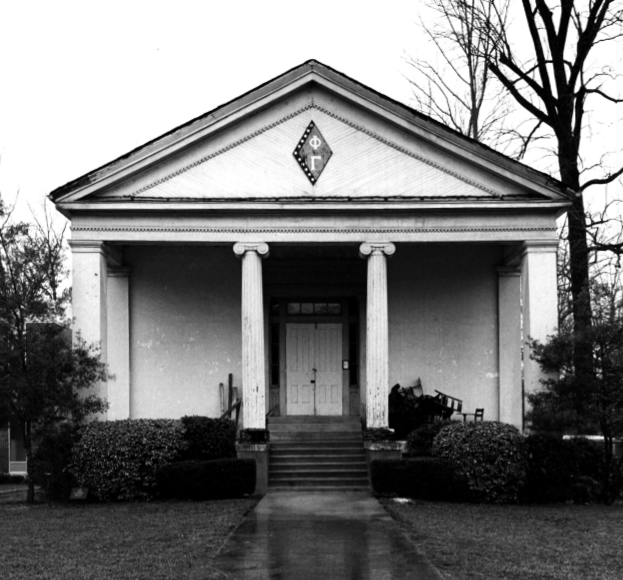
Phi Gamma Hall, built in 1851, is the oldest structure at Oxford.

Sometime in 1837, a year before the inaugural class of students were enrolled, the new student body founded the Phi Gamma literary society on campus. Phi Gamma Literary Society is Oxford's oldest club. The society adapted the motto: Scientia et Religio Libertatis Custodes ("Science and Religion – Freedom Guardians"). In 1851, Phi Gamma Hall was constructed and remains the oldest structure still standing on Oxford's campus. A few years later, Phi Gamma decided it needed a rival society to compete with. Consequently, fourteen members withdrew from Phi Gamma to establish Few Society, named after Ignatius Few. The facilities and libraries of each debate society were open to members of either society. The two halls oppose each other across the quad, and both buildings are variations of two-story Greek Revival structures with temple form designs and columned porticos. Debate topics included the justifiability of war, women's suffrage, the morality of slavery, and prohibition.

In 1850, members of the two literary societies debated whether Georgia should secede from the Union. A vote on the matter by members of both societies resolved for Georgia to remain in the Union. However, when the American Civil War broke out, both debate societies temporarily suspended their activities as members left school to fight in the war. Both Phi Gamma and Few Hall were used as infirmaries for wounded soldiers.

=== Civil War and Reconstruction ===
Financial tension had reduced the college's income and student body prior to the outbreak of hostilities. When war broke out in the summer of 1861, the college's administration decided to temporarily cease all academic operations, and Emory College remained closed for the duration of the fighting. During the war, college facilities were used by both Northern and Southern soldiers as military headquarters and infirmaries, and many deceased soldiers are buried near campus. The school's library and other archives were damaged and later destroyed due to mishandling by military generals. It was not until the summer of 1866 that the campus was able to return to its academic functions, reopening with twenty students and three professors. Emory College continued to struggle with financial hardships after the war, and was only able to continue operations with the aid of a state G.I. Bill.

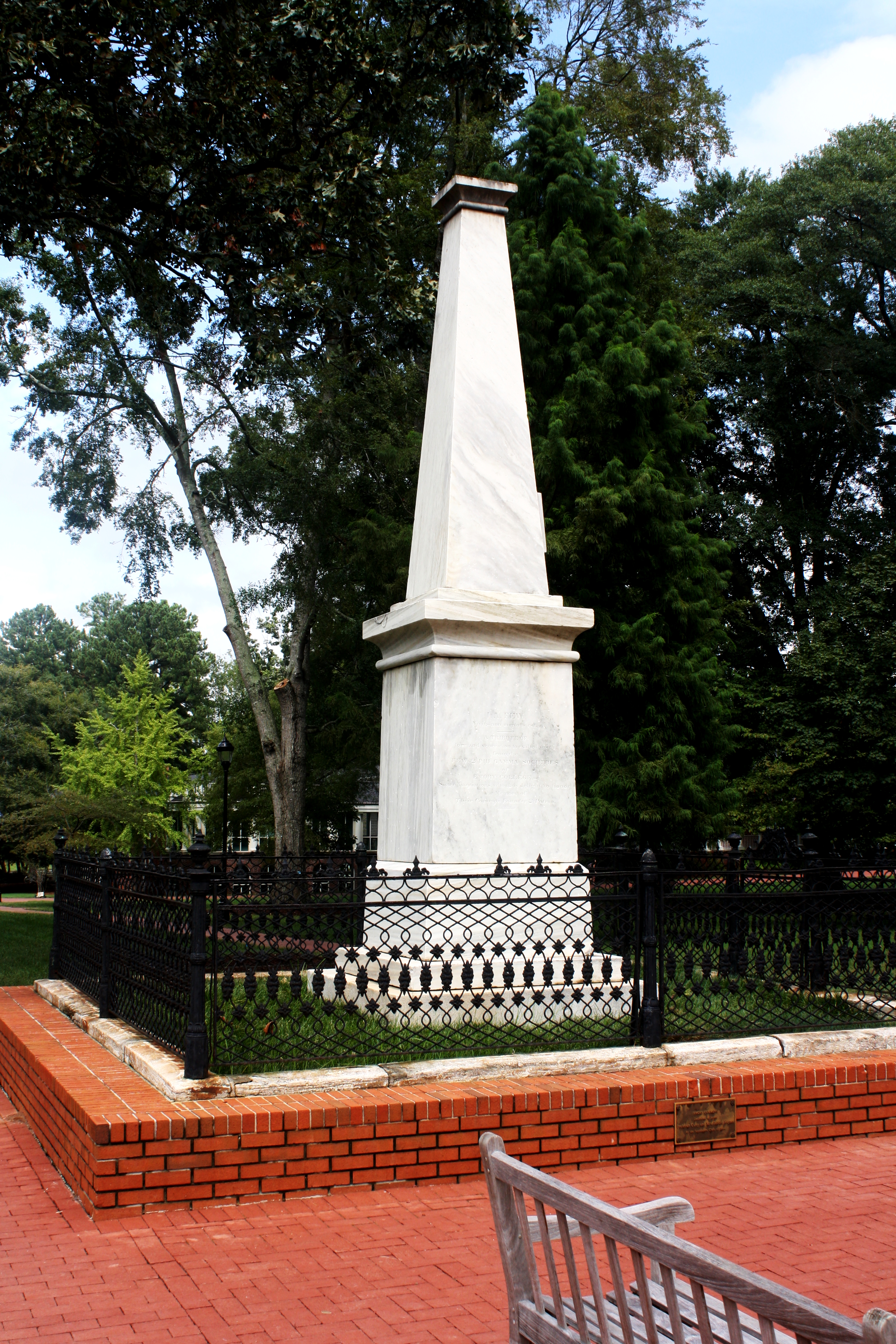
The Few Monument on the Oxford College campus recognizes Ignatius A. Few, one of the college's founders.

In 1880, the school's fortunes reversed when College President Atticus G. Haygood delivered a Thanksgiving Day sermon expressing gratitude for the end of slavery and calling on the South to put the past behind it to "cultivate the growth of industry". The speech captured the attention of George I. Seney, a Brooklyn banker and Methodist. He initially gave Emory College $5,000 to repay its debts, $50,000 for construction, and $75,000 to establish a new endowment. In total, Seney invested more than $250,000 in Emory College, helping to erect the Victorian Gothic-style administrative building in the center of Oxford College that bears his name. The bell in the Seney Hall clock tower is the oldest permanent monument at Emory University today. Cast in 1796, the bell was a gift from Alexander Means, the fourth President of Emory College, who had received it from Queen Victoria.

=== Move to Atlanta ===
By the turn of the 20th century, Emory College had produced several notable graduates. Alben W. Barkley, who graduated in 1900, represented Kentucky in the United States House of Representatives and in the Senate. In 1949, at age 71, he became the oldest Vice President of the United States in history. Thomas M. Rivers became one of the nation's premier virologists at the Johns Hopkins University Medical School, investigating encephalitis and smallpox and later leading the National Science Foundation's quest for a polio vaccine. Dumas Malone went on to become the head of Harvard University Press, one of the nation's leading academic publishers, and completed a Pulitzer Prize-winning six-volume study of Thomas Jefferson when he was over 90 years of age.

Wilbur A. Carlton, a student at Emory College in 1910, described his experiences at the school at the time:

At that time, half-a century ago, Oxford was completely without pavement, plumbing in the homes, and electric lights except for the Williams Gymnasium and the Young J. Allen Memorial Church, which were furnished electricity by a dynamo in the boiler room of the gym. And of course, we obtained water from open wells for drinking as well as for all other purposes ... We had to do our studying by the light of a kerosene lamp. There were scarcely any automobiles and absolutely no co-eds at that particular time although there had been a few previously. There was only one college dormitory, Marvin Hall, which was "outmoded" even for 1910 and which could accommodate only a small part of the student body ... Most of the students lived in boarding houses (or private homes), of which there were several ... Such was our beloved Oxford in 1910.

— Wilbur A. Carlton, In Memory of Old Emory (1962)

Soon, the Georgia Methodist Conference began discussing transforming Emory College into a university, with Birmingham and Atlanta bidding to host the proposed institution. Atlanta was chosen as the home of the new Emory University after Asa Griggs Candler, then-president of the Coca-Cola Company, deeded the university 75 acres (30 hectares) of land near the city's downtown and contributed $1 million to the school's endowment. Candler had been reluctant to donate money to a project that he called "a crumbling castle", but his brother, Warren Candler, convinced him otherwise. Asa Candler served as chair of the Emory University Board of Trustees and his brother later served as university president.

The Oxford campus continued to be used after the school's move to Atlanta in 1915. At first, the site was organized into the Emory University Academy, a preparatory school modeled after Phillips Academy and Phillips Exeter Academy to respond to the failure of the state's public high schools. By 1921, the academy had reached its peak enrollment of three hundred, doubling its previous enrollment record as a college. Due to financial concerns, including the loss of third-party financial support, Emory University cut programs for all academic divisions at the academy, laid off faculty, and raised tuition. By the mid-1930s, with the introduction of college-level curriculum, the University Academy was renamed Emory Junior College at Oxford and the site was reorganized into a two-year junior college. In 1947, influenced by the experimental models of integrating secondary and post-secondary education at the University of Chicago, Emory and Oxford leaders reorganized the Oxford curriculum into the South's first accredited four-year junior college. The curriculum combined an accelerated program for the last two years of high school with the first two years of college. It ended in 1963 after facing enrollment shortages. In response, Dean Virgil Eady recommended a name change to Oxford College of Emory University and advocated the position that Oxford is part of Emory University and not a "quasi-independent college at Oxford". The new college was then set up as a two-year liberal arts program, similar in concept to the original Emory College model.

== Campus ==
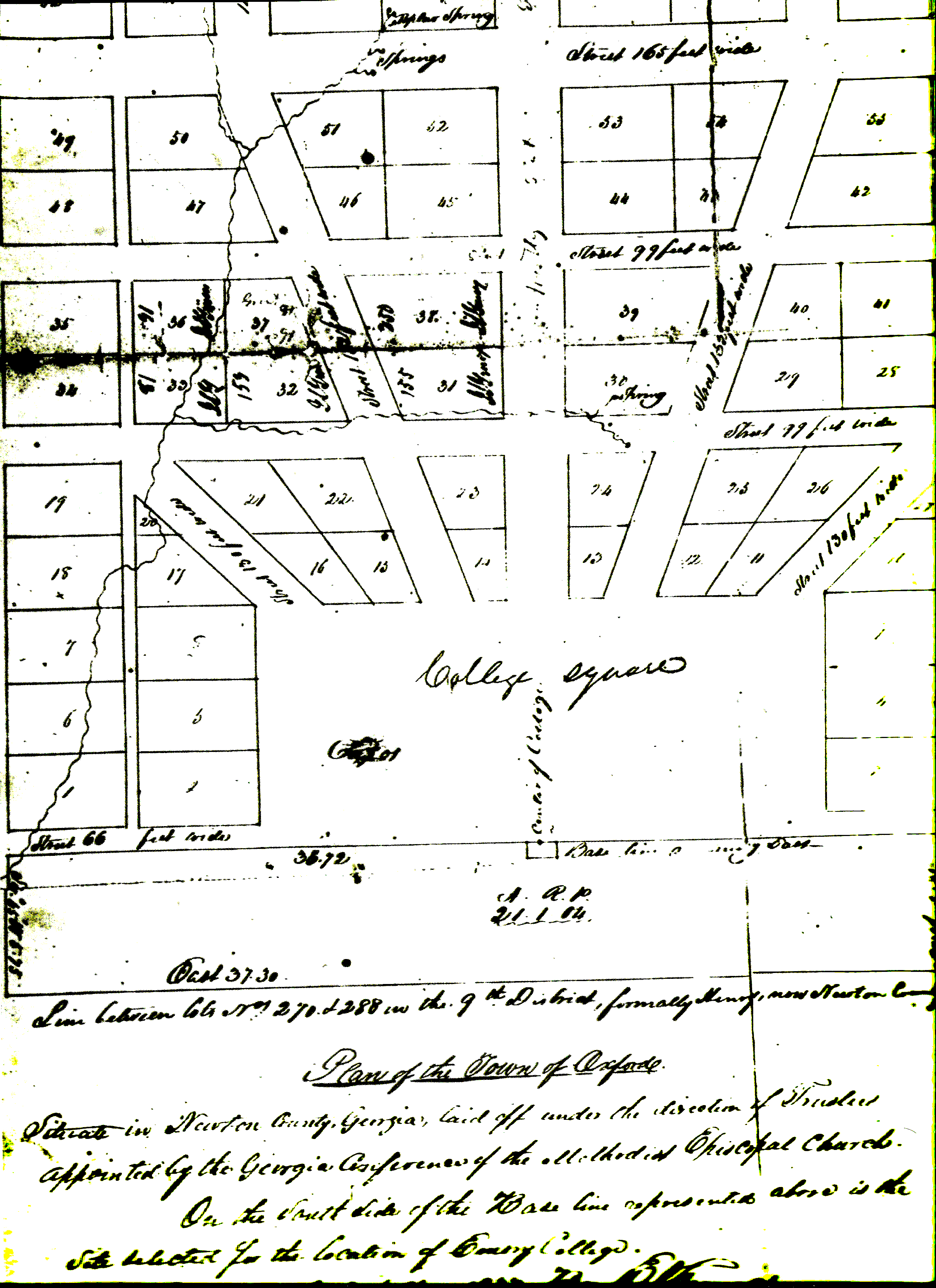
Edward Thomas hand-drew this design for the town of Oxford and Emory College in 1837.

Oxford College is located on 56 acres (23 hectares) of land in Newton County, approximately 38 miles (61 km) east of Emory's Atlanta campus. It is in the center of Oxford, a town located about half a mile north of Interstate 20, and is directly bounded by Georgia State Route 81 (signed as Emory Street) to the east and the Fleming Woods to the west. Emory University's bus routes provide service from Oxford to the Atlanta campus, local shopping centers, and Metropolitan Atlanta Rapid Transit Authority stations.

The college campus and surrounding city of Oxford was planned by surveyor Edward Thomas with input from Ignatius Few. The original plan included five north–south streets radiating from the campus in the south, although the topography to the west of the campus prevented two of those streets from being developed. Today, much of the college is organized around a pedestrian-only quadrangle in the center, surrounded by a few nearby streets and hiking trails that make up the Fleming Woods. The college also owns and operates an 11-acre (4.5 hectare) organic farm that was established in 2014. It is utilized as both an educational environment for related courses, and as a functioning farm that sells its produce at local farmers' markets. In 1975, the campus and many of its older buildings, such as Phi Gamma Hall and Seney Hall, and other surrounding structures were listed on the U.S. National Register of Historic Places (NRHP) as the Oxford Historic District.

In 1885, the Grand Masonic Lodge of Georgia erected a white marble obelisk in memory of Few in the center of the quad. Directly south of the monument is Seney Hall, a five-story Victorian Gothic-style building topped by a clock tower and bell. At the end of every academic year, the bell is rung once in honor of each graduating student. Seney Hall is flanked to the west by Hopkins Hall and the Williams Gymnasium, and to the east by Language Hall, which was recently renovated and restored in 2013. Further to the east sits Candler Hall, which was built in the Neoclassical architectural style and served as the school library until 1970. Today it is a student center and houses a bookstore. Phi Gamma Hall and Few Hall, which used to house the college's literary societies, sit across from each other on the quad.

The other buildings that stand on the quad are: Humanities Hall, the Jolley Residential Center, Oxford Science Building, Tarbutton Performance Arts Center (which now adjoins Few Hall), Pierce Hall, and a library containing nearly 100,000 volumes.

== Academics ==
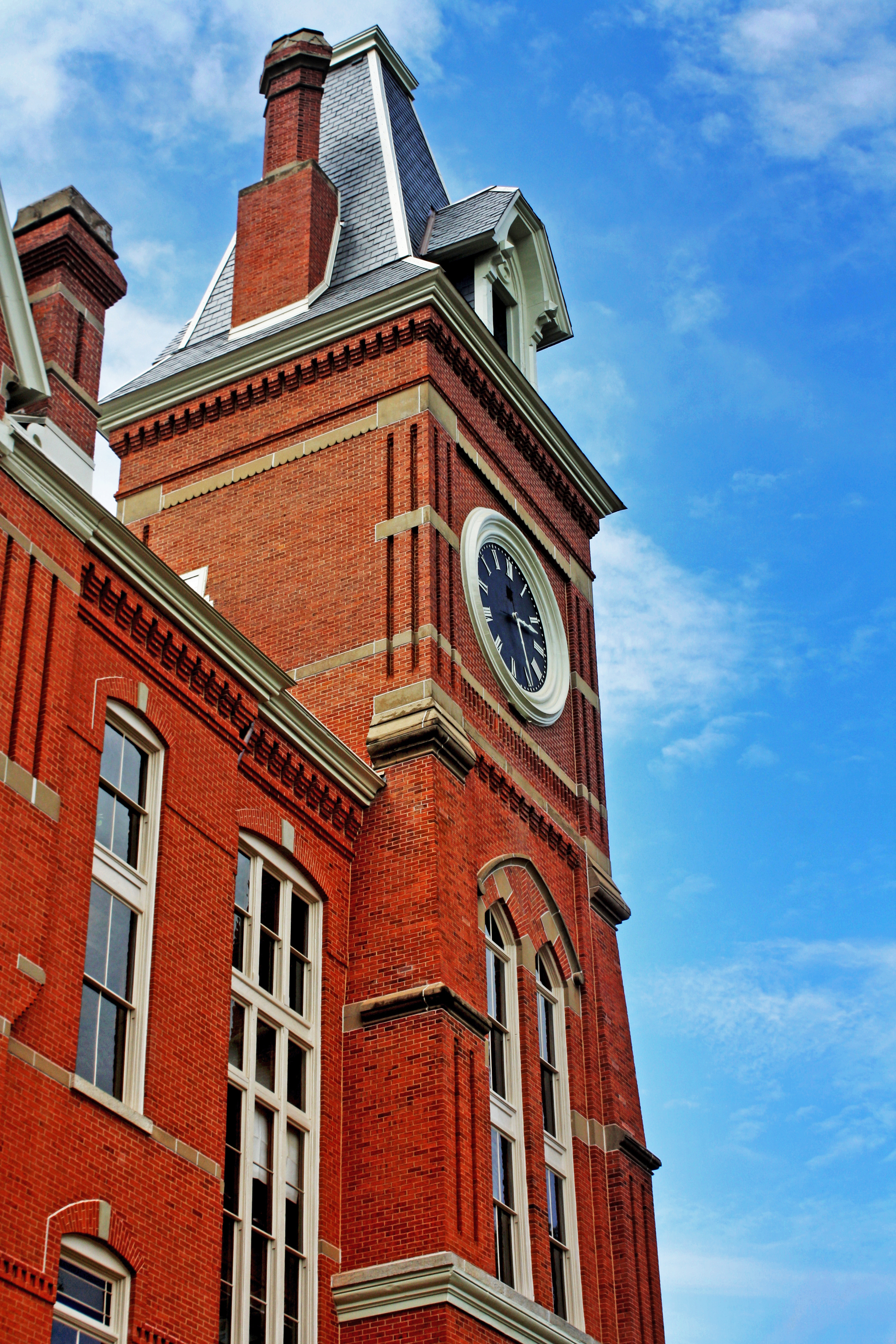
Seney Hall, the center of Oxford College, houses classrooms and the college's executive body.

Oxford College, as part of Emory's undergraduate bachelor's program, offers introductory and intermediate courses that contribute to undergraduate degrees in eighty-five majors, the most popular being: economics, psychology, biology, business administration, neuroscience and behavioral biology, and political science. All courses are on a credit hour system. Some classes are designated "theory-practice service learning" courses, which integrate theory learning in the classroom with real-world application. For example, students enrolled in the Sociology of Food course dedicate certain hours a week working at the school's organic farm. Oxford College's student-to-faculty ratio is 21:1, and the median class size is twenty students. All students receive an associate of the arts degree on completing Oxford's curriculum, before continuing their studies in Atlanta.

=== Faculty ===
Oxford College has sixty-two faculty members in teaching positions, including Nitya Jacob, associate professor of biology who is one of fifteen international recipients of Science Magazine's Inquiry-Based-Instruction Prize, Eloise Carter, a former President of the Association of Southeastern Biologists, Susan Ashmore, a historian whose book on the Civil Rights Act in Alabama won an award from the Southern Historical Association, and Fulbright Fellowship recipient Lucas Carpenter, a professor of literature. William Shapiro, a professor of political science who has taught at Oxford since 1979, formerly worked at the American Enterprise Institute and was a registered conscientious objector during the Vietnam War.

Oxford College has a visiting scholar agreement with the University of Oxford in England, where a faculty member from each school exchanges places for at least one week and delivers public lectures at their host's location. Visiting professors in the past have included Jane Shaw and Tiffany Stern, a professor who studies Shakespearian works.

=== Admissions ===
For the 2018–19 academic year, Oxford College enrolled 993 students; 24% were Asian American, 14% were African American, 13% were Hispanic, and 13% were international students. These are students who applied to Emory University and chose to begin their studies for four semesters at Oxford College before automatically continuing to the School of Arts and Science in Atlanta. Oxford graduates may also choose to apply for admission to the Goizueta Business School or the Nell Hodgson Woodruff School of Nursing.

There were 17,864 applicants for the Oxford College class of 2023, of whom 19.8% were accepted and 475 students enrolled. Admitted students had an interquartile range (25th to 75th centile) GPA of 3.73-3.98 and SAT scores ranging from 680 to 760 in critical reading, 710–790 in mathematics. Oxford College maintains the same application as Emory College on the Common Application, and applicants must indicate if they wish to apply to one or both schools. In addition to regular decision, students may choose to apply and receive an admission decision early via the restrictive early decision option to either Emory College or Oxford College, or both, but not to another school. All applicants are able to participate in the Oxford Scholar program, the highest tier of which offers a full academic merit scholarship for four semesters at Oxford and four semesters at Emory. In 2017-18, sixty-two percent of undergraduates received an average financial aid package of $36,118.

== Student life ==
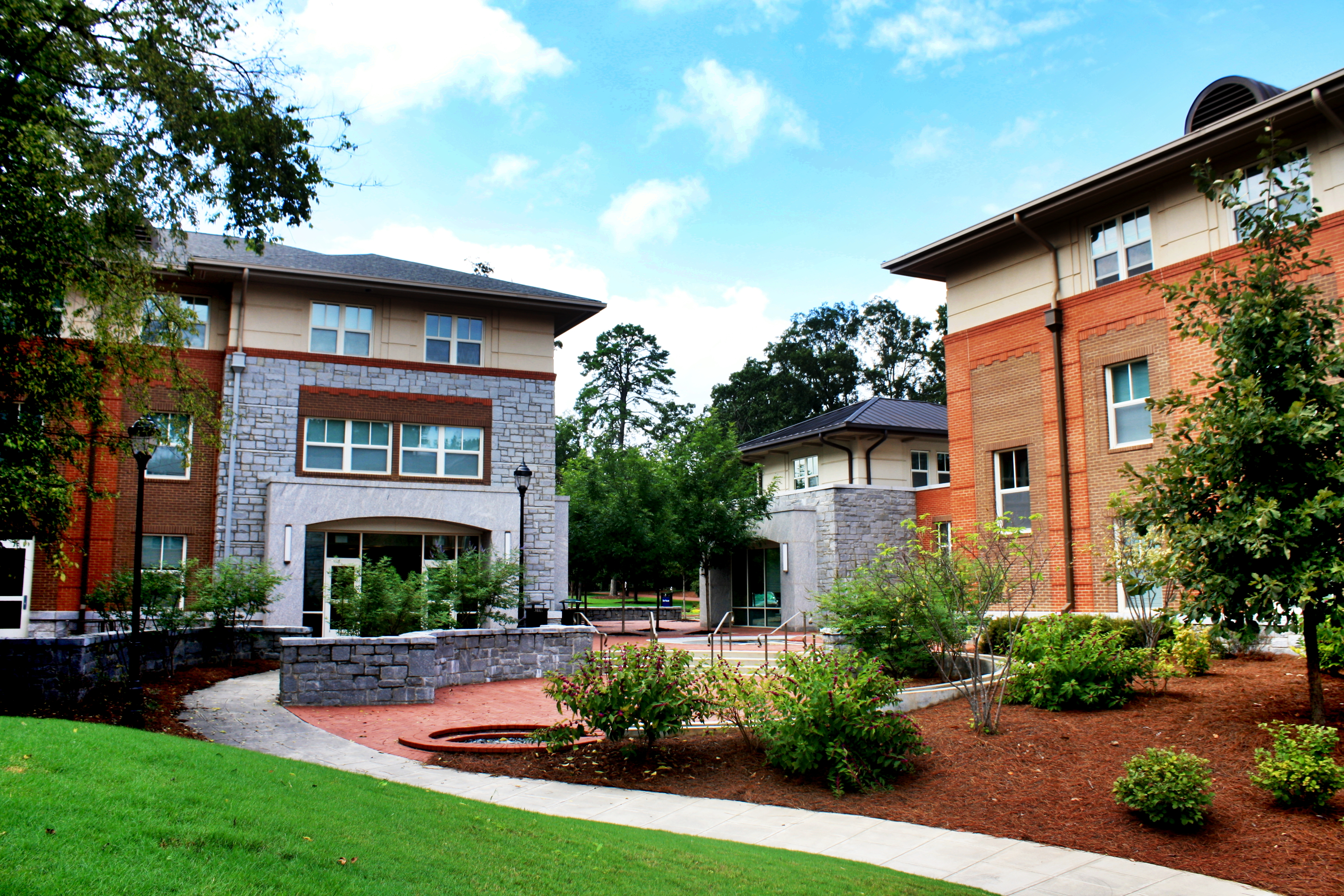
Elizer and Murdy, a student residence hall which opened in 2008, is certified LEED Gold.

=== Residence life ===
All students who live on campus are housed in one of four residential halls: Haygood Hall, Jolley Residential Center, Fleming Hall, or Elizer and Murdy. These buildings range in occupancy from 117 (Haygood) to 348 (Elizer and Murdy). Originally constructed in 1913, Haygood Hall is the oldest residential hall on campus, although it had to be rebuilt after a 1981 fire destroyed the building. The newer residential halls, Elizer, Murdy, and Fleming Halls, are all LEED-certified, with the former two attaining a "Gold" certification.

Students are required to enroll in a dining plan that includes meals in the Oxford Dining Hall, which serves three meals a day with limited service between meals. Fifty percent of all ingredients are sourced locally and ninety percent of waste are diverted from landfills. Some of the food served is sourced from the organic farm on campus. In terms of recreation, Williams Gymnasium houses a hybrid basketball, volleyball, and badminton court, in addition to a track, pool, weight room, and aerobic studio. There are also ten tennis courts and a regulation soccer field on campus. In addition, the nearby Fleming Woods and hiking trails can be used by Oxford students.

=== Activities ===
==== Social clubs ====
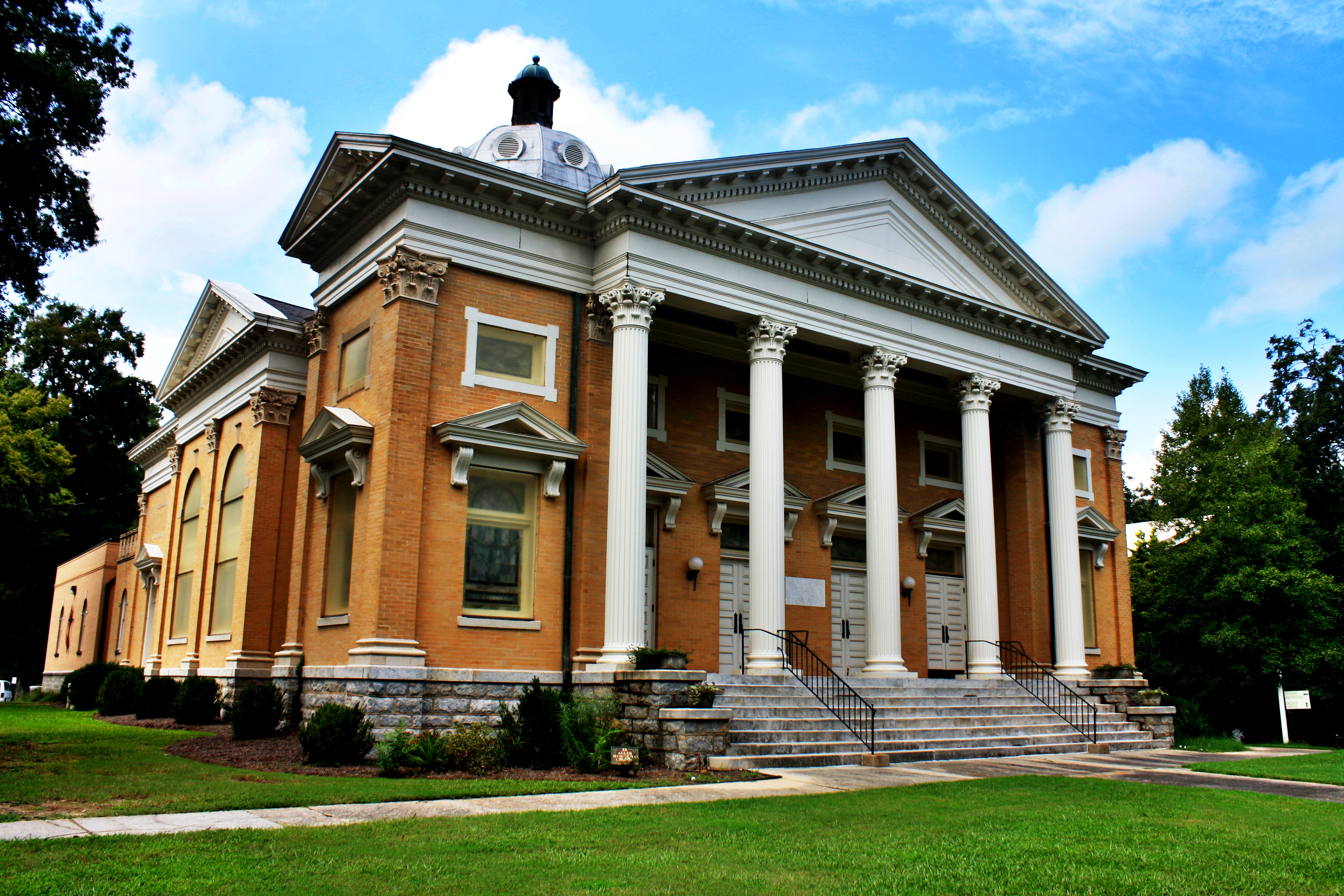
The neighboring Oxford-affiliated United Methodist Church is one of the sources of religious life on campus.

Oxford is different from many colleges in that it does not have traditional fraternities and sororities on campus. In their stead are organizations known as "social clubs". Historically, some of these social clubs, whose members meet regularly at social functions, were determined by geography, such as the Florida Club, South Georgia Club, and Alabama Club. Today, social clubs use the Greek alphabet system and mimic^{[b]} the functions of fraternities and sororities, with the exception of Dooley's Dolls.

==== Student organizations ====
Except for the D.V.S. Senior Honor Society, which was founded in 1902 and remains active today, student clubs at Oxford have not functioned reliably for long periods of time because the two-year structure of the school leads to high membership turnover. To counter this trend, the Leadership Oxford and ExCEL programs were designed by the college in 1988 to help students enhance their leadership skills.

As of 2017, there are over seventy-five registered student organizations which cover a variety of interests, including academic, social, cultural, religious, leisure, arts, and volunteer service. Many of Oxford's student clubs participate in community service, including volunteer-oriented clubs such as Volunteer Oxford, Bonner Leader Program and Circle K. In 2008, Oxford College students' volunteer hours helped Emory University win the Presidential Award for General Community Service, an award given to higher education institutions for their commitment to community service, service-learning and civic engagement. According to a survey conducted by the college prior to 2012, ninety-two percent of Oxford students participated in community service, contributing over 10,000 hours in one year.

=== Traditions ===
==== Dooley ====
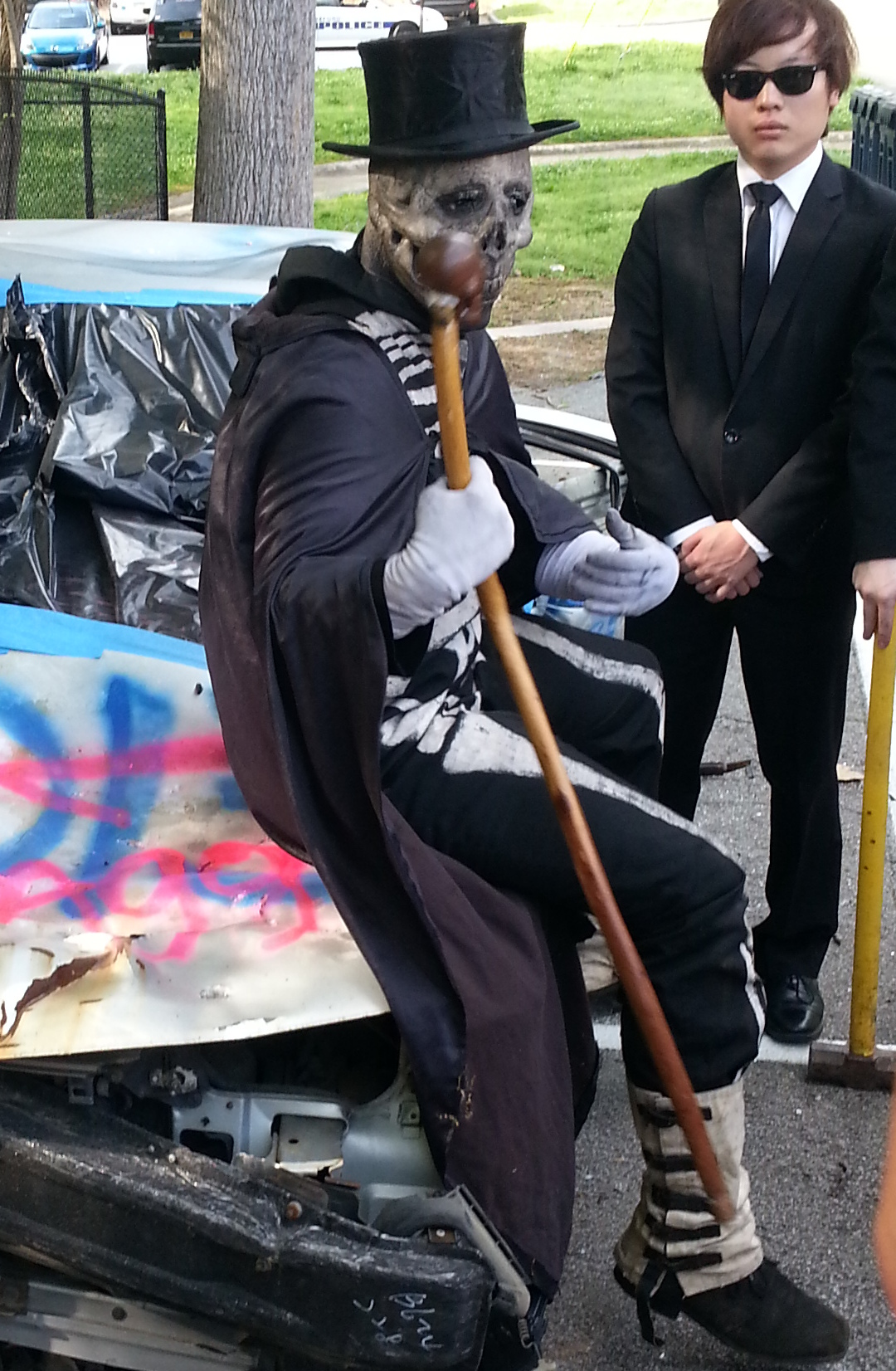
Dooley sits on a wrecked car in support of a student-sponsored "car bash" fundraising event.

Lord Dooley, also known as the "Lord of Misrule" and the "Spirit of Emory", originated in Oxford and acts as Emory University's unofficial mascot. Dooley, who borrows his first name and middle initial from the first and last name of the sitting president of Emory University, has two manifestations: one at Emory's Atlanta campus, and one at Oxford. At both campuses, Dooley is represented by a student in a skeleton costume with a black cape, top hat, and white gloves, flanked on all sides by similarly dressed students acting as bodyguards. However, Oxford's Dooley differs from his more modern and lively counterpart at the Atlanta campus. Because Oxford was his original home, Dooley's appearances there tries to symbolize his advanced age, with characteristics such as a crouched stance, slow walk, and his signature bent crane topped with a brown skull. Additionally, his habit of making public appearances at Oxford by emerging out of a coffin differ from the conventions of his counterpart at the Atlanta campus.

Dooley was first mentioned in an 1899 article printed in the school newspaper, Phoenix, titled "Reflections of a Skeleton". The article was purportedly written by a skeleton in a science lab who complained of his dull and silent existence observing the comings and goings of the students. In 1901, the Dooley mythology resurfaced, this time in a second editorial where he claims to have been the son of a wealthy Virginia planter who fought in the Revolutionary War and later died from alcohol abuse. In 1941, Dooley began appearing physically on campus, starting the tradition known as "Dooley's Week", when he has free rein to let students out of classes. Today, Dooley makes frequent appearances at social functions and other Oxford events, where he passes a message for a designated student to read to the student body. These messages relate to events on campus, ranging from critical rebukes of misdeeds, to praise for individual student accomplishments.

==== Animals ====
Students at Oxford used to steal local farm animals such as roosters and coax them into classrooms as pranks. In the 1930s to 1950s, students began bringing larger farm animals such as goats and cows up to the upper floors of Seney Hall. The tradition culminated in 2008 when a group of unidentified students led a local zebra to the third floor of Seney and barricaded the windows, doors, and elevator.

== Athletics ==
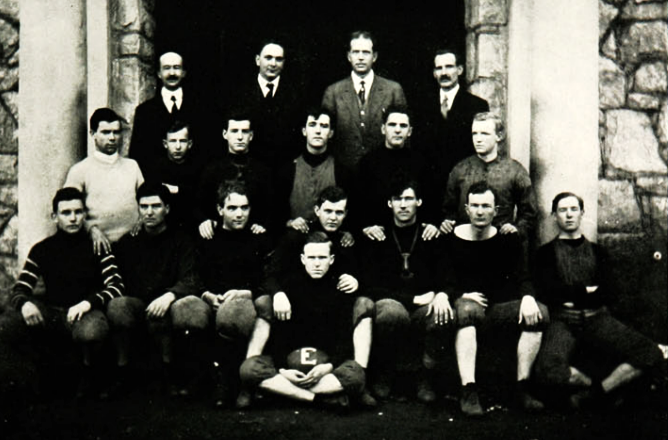
A yearbook photograph of Emory College's intramural football team in 1911

Although President Warren Candler was strongly against intercollegiate sports programs, he started Emory's first intramural sports program in 1897. Over the rest of his term, students started intramural football, baseball, and gymnastic teams. For most its history, Emory did not have an athletic mascot. In 1960, The Emory Wheel sports editor thought it was time to adopt a mascot, but the student body was not interested. Frustrated, he arbitrarily adopted the eagle as the mascot because "the name [was] simply applicable and [had] obvious decorative advantages". Soon after, Oxford also adopted the eagle as its mascot.

Today, Oxford's athletic teams are members of the Georgia Junior College Athletic Association and the National Junior College Athletic Association. Oxford College sponsors men's and women's soccer, men's and women's basketball, men's and women's tennis, and men's and women's golf. The men's tennis team won back-to-back NJCAA III National Championships in 2006 and 2007 and a third in 2009, and the women's tennis team won National Championships in 2011. The women's soccer team reached the national finals in 2006.

== Notable alumni ==
I do not think it advisable for him to return to college this term ... He has never learned to apply himself, which together with very frequent absences, makes it impossible for him to succeed as a student."

— James E. Dickey, President of Emory College, Letter to Robert W. Woodruff's father.
- Alben W. Barkley – A member of the Democratic Party who served as 35th United States Vice President under President Harry S. Truman. He also served as a U.S. Representative and Senate Majority Leader from Kentucky.
- Fred P. Branson - An American attorney who graduated from Emory College and later became an Associate Justice of the Oklahoma Supreme Court (1922-1929).
- Yun Chi-ho – An independence activist in Korea in the early 20th century and possible author of the Korean national anthem
- John B. Cobb – A United Methodist process theologian who helped develop process theology
- James Edward Dickey – The last President of Emory College and first President of Emory University, later elected a Bishop of the Methodist Episcopal Church, South
- Tinsley Ellis – An American blues and rock musician
- Keri Hilson – A singer, songwriter, actress, and R&B artist
- Lee Hong-koo – Former Prime Minister of South Korea
- Cone Johnson – Served in the Texas House of Representatives, the Texas State Senate, and the United States Department of State
- Gordon Lee – Served as a U.S. congressman from Georgia
- Isaac Stiles Hopkins – First president of the Georgia Institute of Technology
- Lucius Quintus Cincinnatus Lamar (II) – Served as a United States Supreme Court Justice and also a Senator from Mississippi
- Dumas Malone – Pulitzer Prize-winning historian, former head of Harvard University Press
- Thomas M. Rivers – Famed virologist, headed the National Science Foundation's search for a polio vaccine
- J. Roy Rowland – Member of United States House of Representatives from Georgia's 8th congressional district. He attended Emory College at Oxford for one year in 1943.
- Robert W. Woodruff – Attended Oxford for one term, then served as President of the Coca-Cola Company. He later donated a total of $230 million to Emory University.

== In popular culture ==
Oxford College and its facilities have served as sets for several movies and television shows:

- In 2015, an installment of the National Lampoon's Vacation series, titled Vacation, filmed scenes on campus.
- On March 1, 2012, Oxford College hosted the Georgia's first showing of 8, a verbatim theatre reenactment by Dustin Lance Black. The play chronicles the district court trial and proceedings of Perry v. Schwarzenegger.
- Scenes from the television show The Vampire Diaries were shot in the school's library, quad, and theater. Thereafter, the school served as the on-location college set for the show's fictional Whitmore College.
- On January 26, 1979, it is featured in the first episode of the television series The Dukes of Hazzard, when General Lee jumps eighty-one feet in front of Seney Hall. This scene remained in the opening credits for the rest of the series. This stunt was recreated by MTV for its series Your Movie Show in July 2005 on the release of The Dukes of Hazzard movie.

== Notes ==
^{a} Oxford is a two-year program, so the class of 2018 is also part of Emory University's class of 2020.
^{b} One such difference between social clubs and fraternities or sororities is that social clubs can be co-ed.
