= Ignatius Alphonso Few =

First President of Emory University

Ignatius Alphonso Few was an American attorney, farmer, and preacher who was selected to lead "a school for manual labor", which subsequently failed and was replaced by a program for “sub-freshmen” at the newly established Emory College. Few became the first president of what is now Emory University.

== Early life and education ==
Few was born on April 11, 1789, the son of Captain Ignatius Few and Mary Candler, in Columbia County, Georgia. .

Few spent large portions of his early life in New Jersey, where he studied at Princeton University, and in New York City before returning to Georgia to study Law in Augusta.

In 1811, he married Salina Carr.

== Career ==
Few became an unsuccessful farmer. He returned to law in 1823 before becoming seriously ill with a form of ‘lung fever’ which was perhaps tuberculosis. At this juncture in his life, he experienced a spiritual conversion and joined the Methodist Episcopal Church.

In 1828, Few felt the call to ministry and was admitted to the MEC as a minister. He was a charter member of the Georgia Conference of the MEC in 1831. However, because of his poor health, he left the active ministry shortly before 1835. In 1838, Few received a Doctor of Law degree (LL.D.) from Wesleyan University in Middletown, Connecticut.

In 1834, the Georgia Conference of the MEC founded a school for manual labor 30 miles outside of what would become Atlanta, just north of the town of Covington. Few was selected to lead. As this was a manual labor school, the students were expected to work three hours a day in the field performing farming chores. Classroom time consisted of reading, writing and arithmetic and was meant to prepare the students for further education.

However well-meaning this concept was, it was rather idealistic for the time. The founders did not have enough experience to take on this project with any success – remember Few’s own failed attempt at farming – and before long the school was overrun with debt. Yet Few persisted and saw a different future for these adolescent students: a traditional college focused on academics. The Georgia Conference, after considerable debate, asked the Georgia legislature for a charter to establish a college. In 1840, the Manual Labor School closed for good and was replaced by a program for “sub-freshmen” at Emory College. Before the end of the first year at Emory, Few realized that his health, poor to begin with, was failing. He remained at Emory until July 1841.

In 1844, he was responsible for writing a report describing the split of the MEC into the Methodist Episcopal Church and the Methodist Episcopal Church, South.

== Death ==
He died, probably as a result of his tuberculosis, on November 21, 1845, in Athens, Georgia, and was buried in the Oxford City Cemetery in Oxford, Georgia.

== Legacy ==
He is commemorated as both the founder of Emory College and the first citizen of Oxford, Georgia. A portrait of Few, done by artist George Cooke in 1841, is part of the collection of the Smithsonian Institution.
