= Lovick Pierce Thomas I =

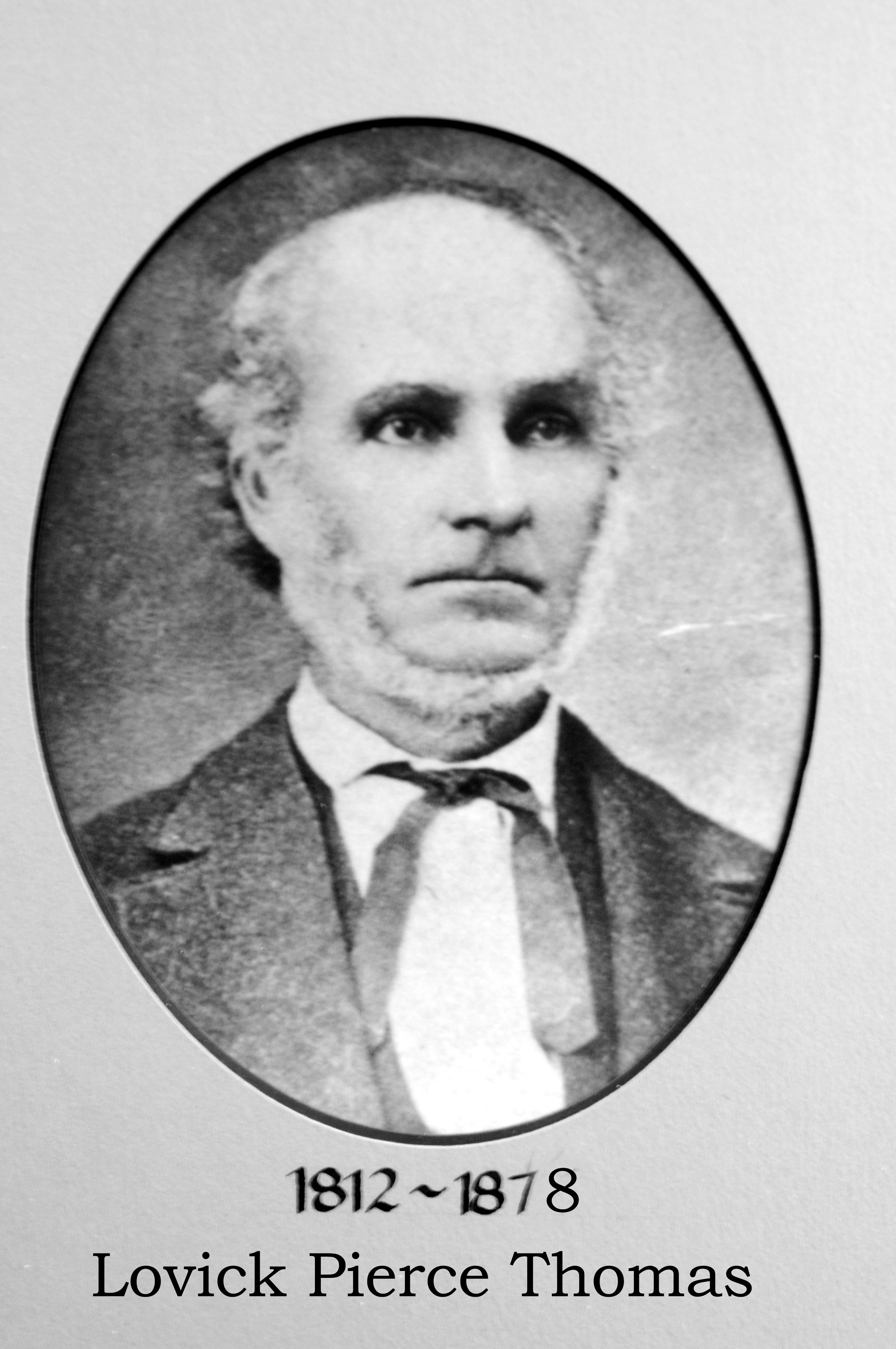
- Born: May 12, 1812; Clarke County, Georgia, US
- Died: May 24, 1878 (aged 66); Atlanta, Georgia, US
- Occupations: Hotel owner; Tavern keeper; City marshal of Atlanta; Captain and quartermaster, Georgia 4th Battalion and 35th Regiment, C.S.A.
- Spouses: Martha Ann Fullwood Thomas; Callie C. Thomas
- Children: Lovick Pierce Thomas II; Martha Ann Thomas; Louisa Thomas; Maria Thomas; Sara Elizabeth Thomas; Henry Andrew "Heck" Thomas
- Relatives: Edward Lloyd Thomas (brother)

Lovick Pierce Thomas I (May 12, 1812 – May 24, 1878) was an American hotel owner, tavern keeper, and Confederate States Army officer who served as a quartermaster in the Civil War from 1861 to 1863. After the war, he served as city marshal of Atlanta, Georgia. He was the father of famed American Old West Deputy U.S. Marshal Heck Thomas and the brother of Confederate Brigadier General Edward Lloyd Thomas.

== Early life ==
Thomas was born on May 12, 1812, in Clarke County, Georgia. He had several brothers who would later serve as Confederate officers, including Henry Philip Thomas, a colonel in the 16th Regiment of Georgia Infantry who was killed at the Battle of Fort Sanders in 1863; Edward Lloyd Thomas, who rose to brigadier general commanding the 35th Georgia Infantry; and Wesley Wailes Thomas, who served as a major in Phillip's Legion of Cavalry.

On May 6, 1834, in Clarke County, Thomas married Martha Ann Fullwood Bedell, a widow with children from her first marriage. Together Lovick and Martha had five children: Lovick Pierce Thomas II (b. 1835), Martha Ann Thomas, Louisa Thomas, Maria Thomas, Sara Elizabeth Thomas, and Henry Andrew "Heck Thomas" (b. 1850), the youngest.

== Career before the war ==
By 1850, Thomas was running the Newton House Hotel in Athens, Georgia. By 1860, he had moved his family to Rome, Georgia, where he was a tavern keeper.

== Civil War service ==
At the beginning of the Civil War, Thomas was made captain and quartermaster of the 4th Battalion, Georgia Infantry on October 14, 1861. His brother Edward Lloyd Thomas was the colonel of the 35th Georgia Infantry Regiment, which was organized from the 4th Battalion. Thomas transferred to the 35th Regiment of Georgia Infantry in 1862 and became known as "the fighting quartermaster."

At the Battle of Seven Pines on May 31 – June 1, 1862, Thomas helped carry General Joseph E. Johnston off the field when Johnston was wounded. At the Battle of Mechanicsville (Beaver Dam Creek) on June 26, 1862, Thomas was wounded with a shot through the right lung but continued to serve. Brigadier General Joseph R. Anderson, commanding the brigade, later commended Thomas in his official report:

Nor can I omit to call special attention to the gallant conduct of Capt. L. P. Thomas, quartermaster of the 35th Ga., who volunteered his service for the occasion in the field, seeing his regiment deficient in field officers. He rendered valuable service until he was seriously wounded.

On September 21, 1863, Thomas resigned his commission due to increasing disability from his wound.

== Postwar life and death ==
After the war, Thomas and his family settled in Atlanta. He served as the city marshal of Atlanta, during which time his youngest son, Heck Thomas, joined the Atlanta police force as a patrolman at the age of seventeen. By 1867, Thomas was running a retail grocery business in Atlanta.

His first wife, Martha Ann, died in 1869. Thomas subsequently married a woman named Callie C. Thomas; they had no children together.

Thomas died on May 24, 1878, in Atlanta.

== Family ==
Thomas's eldest son, Lovick Pierce Thomas II, served as a colonel in the 42nd Regiment, Georgia Infantry during the Civil War. His youngest son, Henry Andrew "Heck" Thomas, became one of the most celebrated lawmen of the American Old West, serving as a Deputy U.S. Marshal in Indian Territory. Along with fellow marshals Bill Tilghman and Chris Madsen, Heck Thomas formed the Three Guardsmen, who were credited with bringing law and order to the territory that would become Oklahoma.
