= Oxford, Georgia =

- City
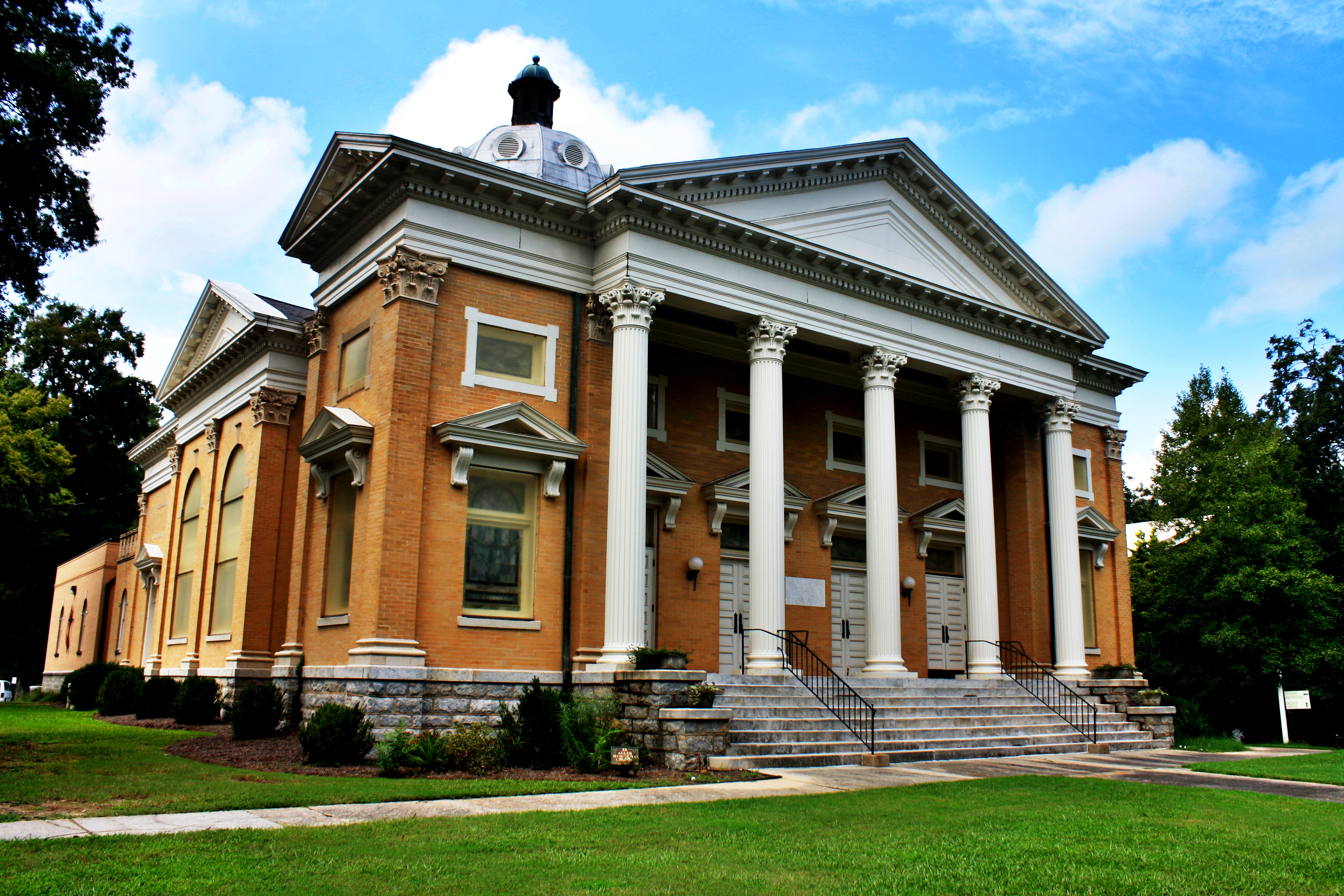
- Young J. Allen Memorial Church, Oxford Historic District

- Location in Newton County and the state of Georgia
- Coordinates: 33°37′27″N 83°52′12″W
- Country: United States
- State: Georgia
- County: Newton

Area
  - Total: 2.18 sq mi (5.64 km^{2})
  - Land: 2.15 sq mi (5.58 km^{2})
  - Water: 0.023 sq mi (0.06 km^{2})
- Elevation: 761 ft (232 m)

Population (2020)
  - Total: 2,308
  - Density: 1,071.8/sq mi (413.81/km^{2})
- Time zone: UTC-5 (Eastern (EST))
  - Summer (DST): UTC-4 (EDT)
- ZIP code: 30054
- Area code: 470/678/770
- FIPS code: 13-58744
- GNIS feature ID: 0332587
- Website: oxfordgeorgia.org

Oxford is a city in Newton County, Georgia, United States. The population was 2,308 as of the 2020 census. It is part of the Atlanta metropolitan area.

It is the location of Oxford College of Emory University. Much of the city is part of the Oxford Historic District on the National Register of Historic Places.

== History ==
Oxford was established as a town by the Methodist Episcopal Church in 1839 as the birthplace of Oxford College of Emory University and incorporated as a city in 1914. The town was named after Oxford University, the alma mater of the founders of Oxford College. The entire town is also designated as a shrine of the United Methodist Church. Additionally, Confederate soldiers are buried in a small cemetery on the grounds of Oxford College.

Properties in Oxford listed on the National Register of Historic Places include the Oxford Historic District and the Orna Villa, a mansion, which was built in 1825, which was used as a hospital during the American Civil War.

The Dukes of Hazzard filmed a car-jump scene on the grounds of the college, and other scenes around the town.

== Geography ==
Oxford is located at 33°37′27″N 83°52′12″W (33.624210, -83.869885). According to the United States Census Bureau, the city has a total area of 2.6 square miles (6.7 km^{2}), all land.

== Demographics ==
Historical population
Census	Pop.	Note	%±
1870	665		—
1880	554		−16.7%
1890	791		42.8%
1900	800		1.1%
1910	655		−18.1%
1920	698		6.6%
1930	537		−23.1%
1940	616		14.7%
1950	817		32.6%
1960	1,047		28.2%
1970	1,373		31.1%
1980	1,750		27.5%
1990	1,945		11.1%
2000	1,892		−2.7%
2010	2,134		12.8%
2020	2,308		8.2%
U.S. Decennial Census

=== Racial and ethnic composition ===
Oxford city, Georgia – Racial and ethnic composition Note: the US Census treats Hispanic/Latino as an ethnic category. This table excludes Latinos from the racial categories and assigns them to a separate category. Hispanics/Latinos may be of any race.
Race / Ethnicity (NH = Non-Hispanic)	Pop 2000	Pop 2010	Pop 2020	% 2000	% 2010	% 2020
White alone (NH)	1,135	1,092	878	59.99%	51.17%	38.04%
Black or African American alone (NH)	616	662	1,141	32.56%	31.02%	49.44%
Native American or Alaska Native alone (NH)	7	4	4	0.37%	0.19%	0.17%
Asian alone (NH)	77	215	24	4.07%	10.07%	1.04%
Native Hawaiian or Pacific Islander alone (NH)	1	0	0	0.05%	0.00%	0.00%
Other race alone (NH)	3	5	5	0.16%	0.23%	0.22%
Mixed race or Multiracial (NH)	18	56	92	0.95%	2.62%	3.99%
Hispanic or Latino (any race)	35	100	164	1.85%	4.69%	7.11%
Total	1,892	2,134	2,308	100.00%	100.00%	100.00%

=== 2020 census ===
As of the 2020 census, Oxford had a population of 2,308. There were 562 households, including 438 family households.

The median age was 22.9 years. 13.0% of residents were under the age of 18 and 13.5% were 65 years of age or older. For every 100 females there were 81.6 males, and for every 100 females age 18 and over there were 77.9 males age 18 and over.

97.2% of residents lived in urban areas, while 2.8% lived in rural areas.

Of the 562 households in Oxford, 30.6% had children under the age of 18 living in them. Of all households, 40.7% were married-couple households, 18.3% were households with a male householder and no spouse or partner present, and 35.8% were households with a female householder and no spouse or partner present. About 27.7% of all households were made up of individuals, and 12.6% had someone living alone who was 65 years of age or older.

There were 624 housing units, of which 9.9% were vacant. The homeowner vacancy rate was 4.4% and the rental vacancy rate was 4.2%.

== Notable people ==
- Cora Mae Bryant (1926–2008) , blues musician
- Sarah Branham Matthews (1888–1962), microbiologist
- Heck Thomas (1850–1912), frontier lawman
- William and Zachary Zulock (born 1989 and 1987, respectively), child rapists and sex offenders
