= List of presidents of Huston–Tillotson University =

The following is a list of presidents of Huston–Tillotson University, and a list of the presidents of the precursor schools of Samuel Huston College and Tillotson College which merged in 1952.

== Samuel Huston College ==
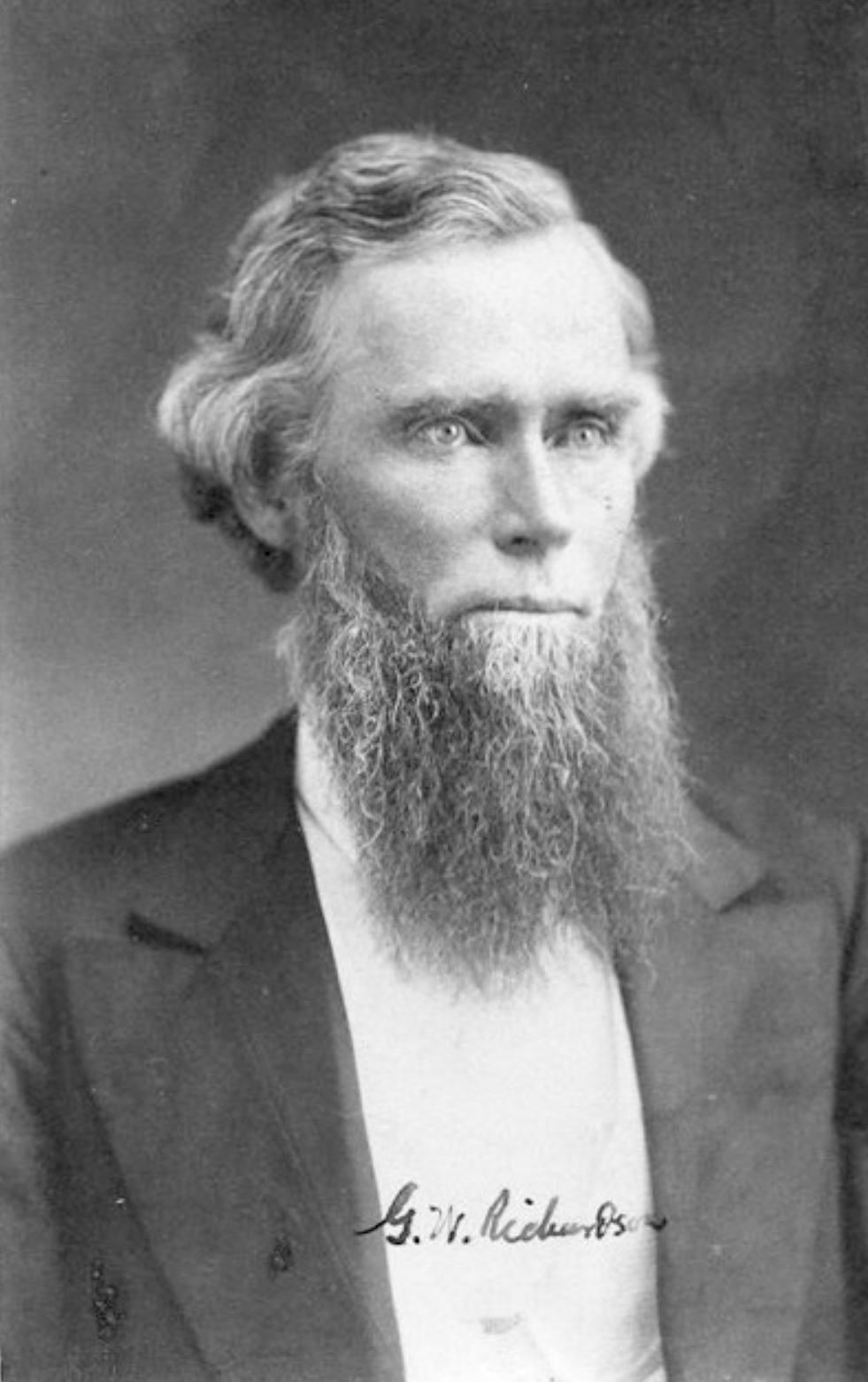
Rev. George Warren Richardson, first president of Samuel Huston College

1. George Warren Richardson, 1876 to 1882
2. Thomas M. Dart, 1885 to 1888
3. Reuben Shannon Lovinggood, 1900 to 1916
4. J. W. Frazier, 1916 to 1917 (interim)
5. Matthew Simpson Davage, 1917 to 1920
6. Joseph P. Randolph, 1920 to 1923
7. Robert Nathaniel Brooks, 1923 to 1926
8. Thomas Russell Davis, 1926 to 1930
9. Willis J. King, 1930 to 1932
10. Stanley E. Graunnum, 1932 to 1943
11. Karl Everett Downs, 1943 to 1948
12. Robert F. Harrington, 1948 to 1952

== Tillotson College ==
1. William E. Brooks, 1881 to 1884
2. John Kershaw, 1884 to 1886
3. Henry L. Hubbell, 1886 to 1888
4. William M. Brown, 1888 to 1894
5. Winfield S. Goss, 1894 to 1896
6. Marshall R. Gaines, 1896 to 1902
7. Arthur W. Partch, 1902 to 1905
8. Isaac Merrit Agard, 1905 to 1918
9. Francis Wayland Fletcher, 1918 to 1924
10. J. T. Hodges, 1924 to 1930 (first African-American president)
11. Mary Elizabeth Branch, 1930 to 1944 (female president)
12. William H. Jones, 1944 to 1952

== Huston–Tillotson University ==
1. Matthew Simpson Davage, 1952 to 1955
2. John Jarvis Seabrook, 1955 to 1965
3. John Quill Taylor King Sr., 1965 to 1988 (longest serving)
4. Joseph Turner McMillan Jr., 1988 to 2000
5. Larry L. Earvin, 2000 to 2015
6. Colette Pierce Burnette, 2015 to 2022 (female president)
7. Archibald W. Vanderpuye, 2022 (interim)
8. Melva K. Williams, 2022–present
