= History of African Americans in Austin =

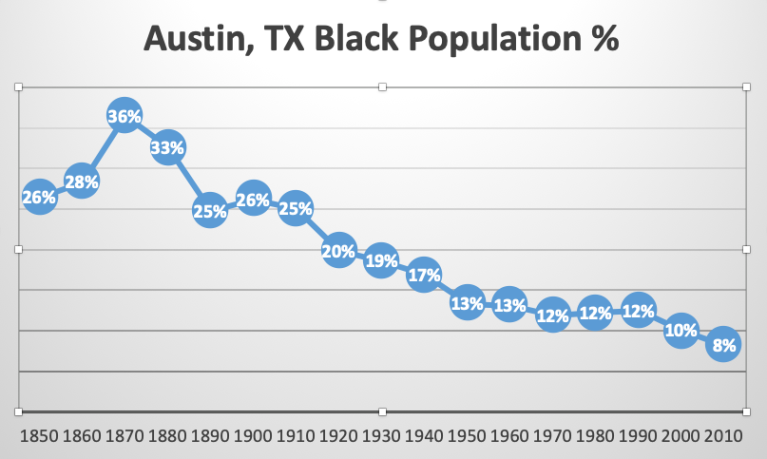
Graph of the relative share of the Austin population that is African-American.

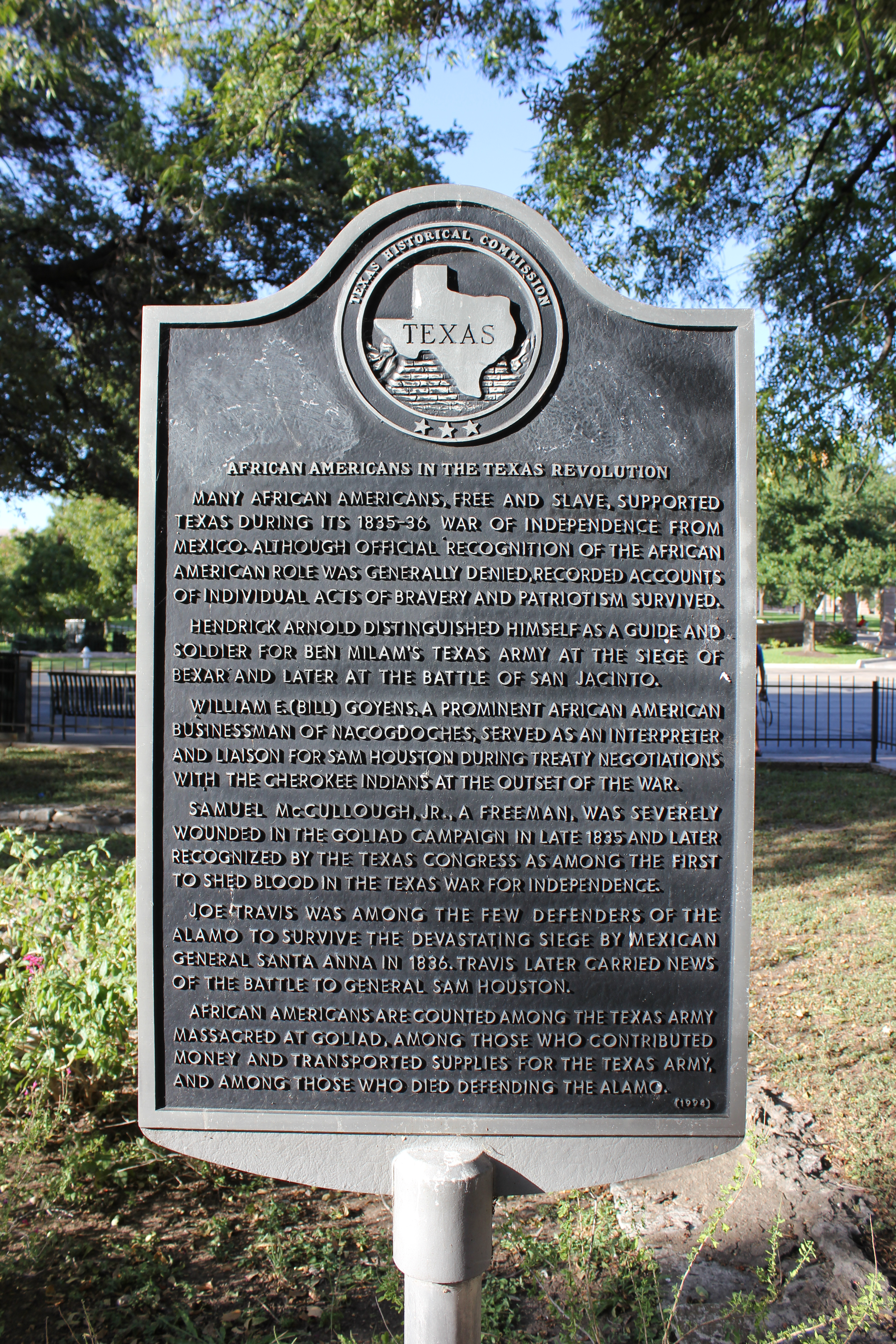
Historical marker in Austin, Texas, commemorating African American involvement in the Texas Revolution

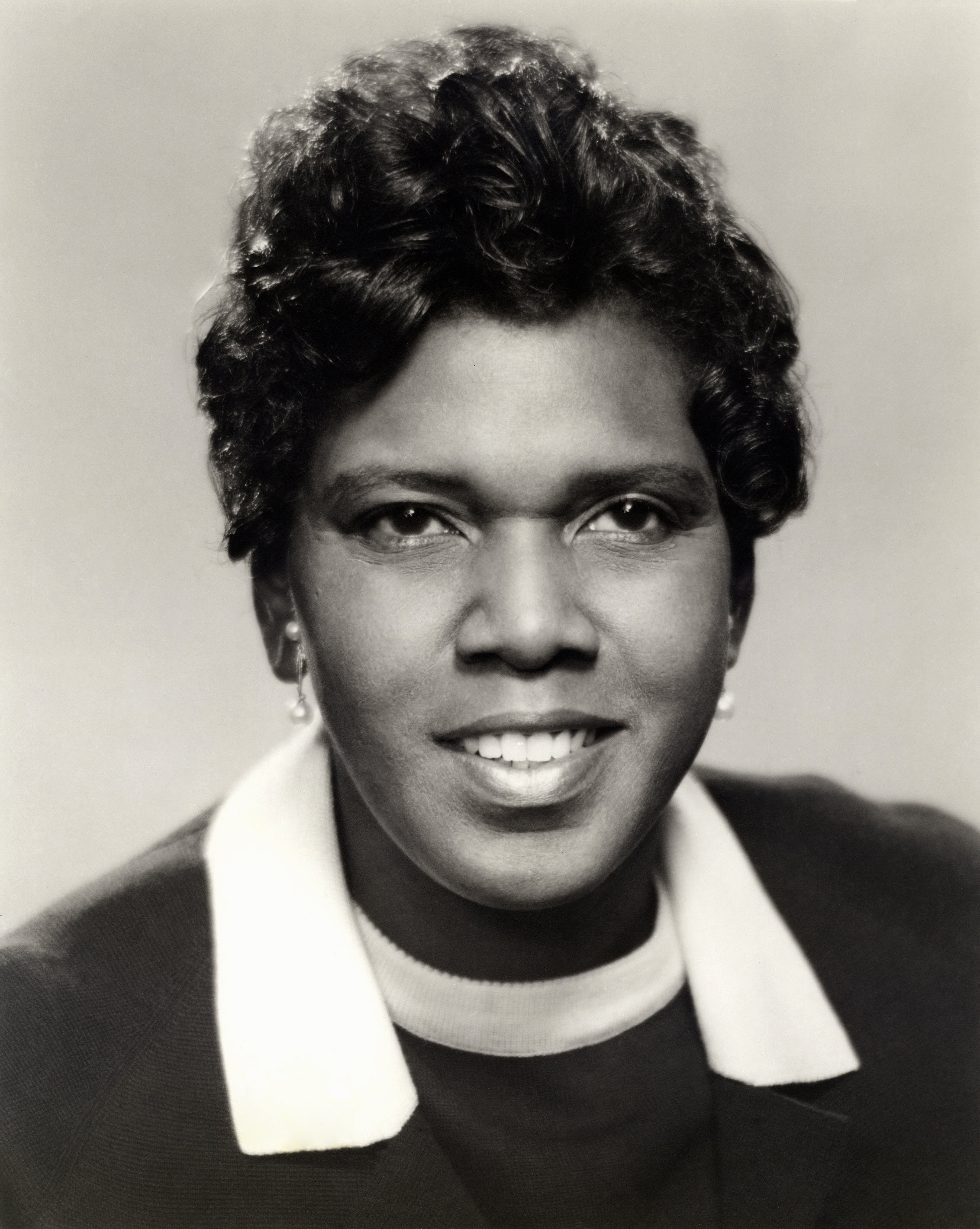
Barbara Jordan, a prominent member of the African American community in Austin

The history of African Americans in Austin dates back to 1839, when the first African American, Mahala Murchison, arrived. By the 1860s, several communities were established by freedmen that later became incorporated into the city proper. The relative share of Austin's African-American population has steadily declined since its peak in the late 20th century.

During the Reconstruction Era, newly emancipated African American slaves began moving from rural areas into towns and cities to establish Freedmen's towns (also known as freedmantowns). Several such communities existed in Austin, including Clarksville, Wheatville, Masontown and Kicheonville.

African Americans have pioneered public safety roles in Austin, including the hiring of the first African American firefighters in the state. African American police officers, rarely seen until the 1930s, were hired by the Austin Police Department since the early 1900s. Officers John Gaines and Tom Allen were the first 2 of 3 officers killed in the line of duty in the history of the agency.

In 1968, Wilhelmina Ruth Delco became the first African American to be elected to public office in Austin. In 1972, Barbara Jordan, a leader in the Civil Rights Movement, was elected to the Texas Senate as the first African American since the Reconstruction Era. Due to historic segregation, Jordan was unable to attend the University of Texas at Austin. Ironically, after retiring from a life of politics, Jordan went on to become an adjunct ethics professor at the university. There is now a statue honoring Jordan on the university campus and a boulevard named in her honor. Pflugerville has the largest percentage black population out of all suburban cities in the Austin metro.

== History ==
Early in Austin's history saw an influx of slaves from the Colorado River, whom were brought to work on plantations growing cotton and other cash crops. In 1885 convict labour, which consisted largely of African American people, was heavily used to build the Texas state capital building.

Texas was the last Confederate state with institutional slavery until June 19, 1865, following the announcement of General Order No. 3 by Union Army General Gordon Granger, proclaiming freedom for enslaved people in Texas. Juneteenth celebrations were first celebrated in Austin in 1867 under the auspices of the Freedmen's Bureau, and it had been listed on a "calendar of public events" by 1872. That year, black leaders in Texas raised $1,000 for the purchase of 10 acres (4 ha) of land to celebrate Juneteenth, today known as Houston's Emancipation Park.

In 1863, the Henry Green Madison log cabin was built in the name Henry Green Madison, a civic leader and the first African American to serve on the City Council. The cabin was reconstructed at Rosewood Recreation Centre, and was home to Madison, his wife and their eight children.

The Dedrick-Hamilton House was once owned by Thomas Dedrick, who was one of the first freed enslaved persons in Travis County, Austin. The home was built in 1880 and was in one of the earliest African American communities in East Austin. The house is now fully restored and serves as an African American Visitors Centre and retail shop The Dedrick-Hamilton House also houses the Greater Austin Black Chamber of Commerce, an organisation that inspires, develops and promotes Black economic success in the Greater Austin area.

During much of the 19th and 20th century, Austin and the rest of the United States of America, experienced significant racial segregation. Members of the African American community were faced with legal and systematic segregation of most public spaces and resources, which saw a large demographic shift, forcing many African American's in Texas into East Austin neighbourhoods. Many homes within these neighborhoods were subsequently used as lodges and communal centres for members of the African American community in Austin.

The 1928 Austin City Plan (also known as the Koch and Fowler Plan), was a strategy imposed by the city council to isolate minorities through creation of a "negro district" and other areas specific to ethnic minorities. Members of these districts were only allowed to access schools and other public services within their identified areas. This segregation was later enforced by the New Deal program that was launched in 1935, excluded the African American community and other minority groups from the benefits of the program, which sought to restore household wealth following the Great Depression.

During the 1960s, Austin African American native Joan Means Khabele, swam in the famous Barton Springs Pool to protest the racial segregation that was characteristic of Austin during that time period. Her actions lead to weekly ‘swims-ins’ by members of the Black community, and resulted in the eventual desegregation of the Barton Spring Pools (Reding, 2022). On April 4, 2024, an Austin City Council resolution named the bathhouse at Barton Springs Pool the "Joan Means Khabele Bathhouse at Barton Springs Pool".

The Limerick-Frazier House operated as a lodging for African American students and travellers who were excluded from white-owned hotels in Austin during the era of the Jim Crow Laws. The house was owned by John W. Frazier, an African American professor at Samuel Huston College and has a century-long connection to African American History.

The W.H. Passon Historical Society was formed in 1975 to preserve materials, artefacts and historic sites pertaining to African American culture. The society is named after Wesley H. Passon, an educator and prominent churchman who wrote what is believed to be the first published history of African Americans in Austin; a 1907 book commemorating the 25th anniversary of the Metropolitan African Methodist Episcopal Church.

In 2016, the Texas African American History Memorial was installed on the State Capital grounds. Its purpose is to honour, acknowledge and commemorate Austin's and wider Texas’ African American population, their culture and all of its people collectively and individually. Sculpted by Ed Dwight, the Memorial encapsulated African American history from Early American history in the 1950s to modern day, with reference to significant African American individuals who shaped the community including Hendrick Arnold and Barbara Jordan. The memorial also acknowledges the events of Juneteenth.

== Culture ==
=== Music ===
Austin is known as the 'Live Music Capital of the World', with the most live music venues per capita. This can be largely attributed to the prominent African American jazz and blues, which can be traced back to the early 1900s. The Victory Grill became the home to the blues and R&B in Austin during the 1940s, featuring live music and weekly screenings of African American movies.

Charlie Gilden, an African American businessman purchased a block on the East Side of Austin during the height of segregation in the 1950s, which included a swanky jazz and blues venue called ‘Charlie's Playhouse’ and an after-hours club called Ernie's Chicken Shack. Hubbard and The Jets, led by Henry “Blues Boy” Hubbard, were the house band for both venues. Hubbard is considered one of Austin's ‘most legendary living musicians’.

=== Sport ===
The Austin Black Senators were a minor league Negro League baseball team based in Austin during the early 20th century, leading up to the 1940s. Their home ground, Downs Field is currently home to the Huston-Tillotson University and Austin Metro Baseball League. National Baseball Hall of Fame inductee Willie Wells played one season for the Black Senators in 1923.

The baseball field was first built at its current site in 1927, and acted as the home ground of Samuel Huston College, which would later merge with Tillotson College in 1952. In December 1938, the college sold the land to the Austin Public School District, which built Anderson Stadium for the Anderson High School football team. In 1949, the city built Downs Field on a different location and was further relocated to its current place in 1954.

Downs Field was named a Historical Landmark by the Texas Historical Commission in 2015, and was the first baseball field in the state to earn that recognition. The field has since been renovated to include mosaics of Negro League legends, Satchel Paige, Hilton Smith, Toni Stone, “Smokey" Joe Williams and Wells Adams in the style of professional baseball cards from the Negro League Era.

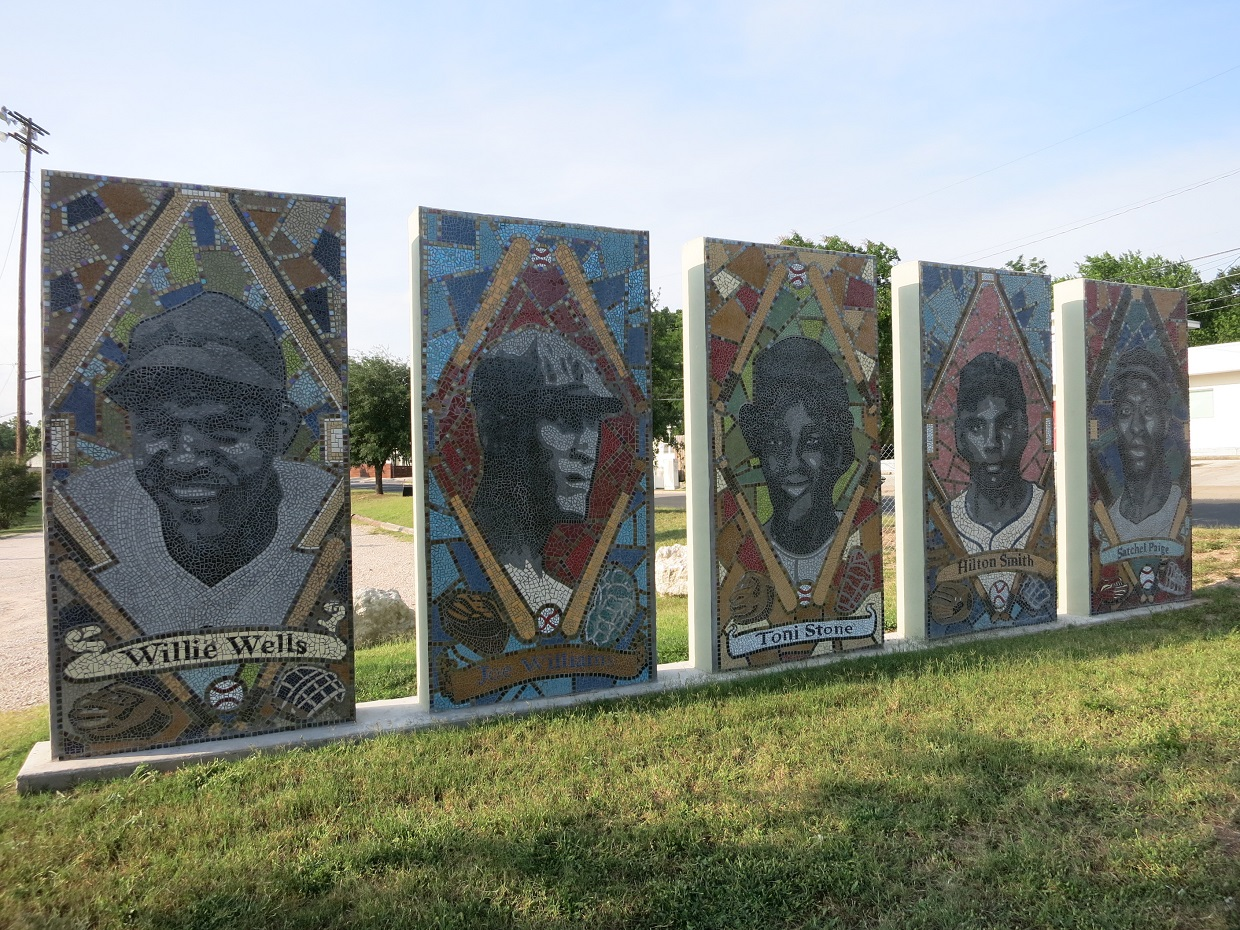
Mosaics depicting Willie Wells, Smokey Joe Williams, Toni Stone, Hilton Smith, and Satchel Paige.

The Southwestern Athletic Conference was created by the Texas Black Schools in 1920, allowing African Americans to play football and a range of other sports, which they were previously unable to access at the height of segregation in the US. The Southwestern Athletic Conference was known as one of the top African-American athletic conferences in the United States.

=== Education ===
In 1884, the Robertson Hill School, one of the city's first schools for African American children was built at San Marcos and 11th streets. A high school was later added in 1889 before being relocated in 1907 to Olive and Curve Streets, where it was renamed to E.H Anderson High School.

The Coloured Teachers State Association building served African American teachers from 1952 until 1966 when it merged with the Texas State Teachers Association. The group was instrumental in the struggle to desegregate public schools and win equal rights and wages for African American teachers throughout Texas.

At the University of Texas, which is located in Austin, The Big XII Conference on Black Students. The conference was made when Black students from all of the schools in the Big Eight Conference came together in recognition that they were suffering from similar problems in their respective institutions. The Annual Big XII Conference meets every year to promote leadership, awareness, and goodwill to the Black Communities in Austin and wider Texas, both on and off-campus.

The Art Galleries at Black Studies at the University of Texas has two galleries dedicated to showcasing narratives of Black and African identities: The Christian-Green Gallery and the Idea Lab.

=== Politics ===
Barbara Jordan, an Austin native, was the first African-American person to serve in the Texas Senate since its reconstruction and served from 1966 to 1972. She was also the first African American woman elected to the U.S. Congress from the South, serving from 1972 to 1978, and was the first woman to deliver the keynote address at a national party convention (Democratic Convention in 1976 and 1992). To commemorate her achievements, there are statues of Jordan placed at Austin's airport and on the University of Texas campus.

=== Housing ===
The Rosewood courts were the first housing projects built for African Americans under the U.S. Housing Act of 1937 and were established as part of the New Deal, which was lobbied by the then congressman Lyndon Baines Johnson.

The Rogers Washington Holy Cross Historical district was originally developed in the 1950s and was named a historic district in 2020. It served as the first Black-only district in Austin and featured seven homes.

=== Arts ===
The George Washington Carver Museum and Cultural Center collects, preserves and exhibits African American historical and cultural material in Austin. The museum has two rotating art galleries as well as four permanent exhibits honoring African-American history in Austin and beyond.

Six Square is a non-profit organization based in Central East Austin that preserves the art, culture, and history of Austin's African American community. They were established in 2013 as part of the City Council's African American Quality of Life Initiative, which detailed widespread disparities, racial biases, and a decreasing Black population in Austin.

The Spectrum Theatre Company is an Austin-based company that seeks to explore the human condition through the lens of the African American experience, depicting stories and the history of the African American community in Austin.

=== Community ===
The African American Youth Harvest Foundation (AAYHF) is a program that provides resources to underserved, at-risk youth and their families in Austin and outlying areas. To date they have assisted over 9,000 youth and adults and have received services at their flagship African American Youth Resource Centre.

The Dance Africa Fest is an initiative that has been running in Austin since 2014. It provides the opportunity for Austin and Central Texas communities to experience, explore and engage in music and movement of the African/Black diaspora. Their team is made up of professional African American musicians and experts on the Black diaspora relative to Austin and wider Texas.

The Austin Black Pride is an organization created in 2016, that represents the LGBTQ African American community in Austin. They aim to provide education, healthcare, employment and housing to members of the African American community whilst bringing awareness to many of the issues within the Black community.

== Notable people ==
- Barbara Jordan – US Representative
- Willie Wells – American Baseball Player
- Wesley H. Passon
- Gary Clark Jr. – Musician
- Nelly – Musician
- Mehcad Brooks – Actor
- Ephraim Owens – Musician
- Don Baylor – American Baseball Player
- Thomas Henderson – American Football Player
- Richard Lane – American Football Player
- Michael Devin Griffin – America Football Player
- Ciara – Musician

== See also ==
- 1928 Austin city plan
- History of African Americans in Texas
