= Lovinggood =

Lovinggood is a surname. Notable people with the surname include:

- Reuben Shannon Lovinggood (1864–1916), American educator and college president
- Lillie England Lovinggood (1871–1896), American teacher and writer
