= Haven Institute =

Haven Institute may refer to:

- Haven Institute (Gabriola Island, Canada), a health centre on Gabriola Island, British Columbia
- Haven Institute (Meridian, Mississippi), a former private historically black Methodist college

== See also ==
- Haven (disambiguation)
