= Tazewell Branch =

American politician (1828-1925)

- Born: May 13, 1828; Prince Edward County, Virginia, U.S.
- Died: April 30, 1925 (aged 96); Camden, New Jersey, U.S.
- Occupations: Politician, shoemaker, grocer, blacksmith
- Spouse: Harriet Lacy
- Children: 10, including Mary Elizabeth Branch

Tazewell Branch (May 13, 1828 – April 30, 1925) was an American state legislator, former slave, and a shoemaker. He was twice elected to the Virginia House of Delegates.

== Biography ==
Branch was born into slavery on May 13, 1828, in Prince Edward County, Virginia and served as a house servant and shoemaker until his emancipation. He was literate and was considered intelligent by his contemporaries, aspects that worked in his favor once he was freed.

He married his wife Harriet Lacy around 1859 and together they had about ten children. Branch owned property in Farmville and was active in local politics. He was elected to serve as a Delegate in 1873 and was again elected in 1875, partially due to people defecting from his opponent's party, however he chose against seeking a third term due to a growing disgust for politics. After his term in the House of Delegates, Branch served as an assistant assessor of internal revenue, a position he was dismissed from in October 1881.

Branch then worked as a shoemaker and later ran a grocery store but found little success in either venture. He continued to live in Farmville until around 1911, when he moved to New Jersey. Branch died in Camden, New Jersey on April 30, 1925.

His daughter Mary Elizabeth Branch served as the president of Huston–Tillotson University (then called Tillotson College) and attended Virginia State University (then called Virginia Normal and Collegiate Institute), which has named its Branch Hall after her.

== See also ==
- African American officeholders from the end of the Civil War until before 1900
