= John Jarvis Seabrook =

American theologian, pastor and academic administrator (1899-1975)

5th President of Claflin College
- In office 1945–1955
- Other names: J.J. Seabrook
- Preceded by: Joseph B. Randolph
- Succeeded by: Hubert V. Manning

2nd President of Huston-Tillotson College
- In office 1955–1965
- Preceded by: Matthew Simpson Davage
- Succeeded by: John Quill Taylor King Sr.

Personal details
- Born: April 12, 1899 Orangeburg, South Carolina, United States
- Died: May 1, 1975 (aged 76) Austin, Texas, United States
- Education: Clark College (BD), Gammon Theological Seminary (BD), Howard University (LLB), Boston University (LLM), Allen University (LLD)
- Occupation: Academic administrator, theologian, pastor, university president emeritus

John Jarvis Seabrook (April 12, 1899 – May 1, 1975) was an American theologian, Methodist pastor, and academic administrator. He was the president-emeritus of Huston–Tillotson University, a HBUC in Austin, Texas; and the president-emeritus of Claflin University, a HBUC in Orangeburg, South Carolina. He also went by the name J.J. Seabrook.

== Early life and education ==
John Jarvis Seabrook was born on April 12, 1899, in Orangeburg, South Carolina, to Black parents Amanda (née Jarvis) and John Seabrook.

He graduated in 1930 with a B.A. degree from Clark College in Atlanta; in 1930 with a B.D. degree from Gammon Theological Seminary (now Interdenominational Theological Center) in Atlanta; L.L. B degree in 1926 from Howard University in Washington, D.C.; L.L.M. degree from Boston University; and L.L.D, degree from Allen University. He also did additional coursework at Garrett–Evangelical Theological Seminary in Evanston, Illinois.

== Career ==
Seabrook served as the president of Claflin College (now Claflin University), a historically black university in Orangeburg, South Carolina, from 1945 to 1955.

Seabrook served as the president of Huston-Tillotson College (now Huston–Tillotson University), a historically black university in Austin, Texas, from 1955 to 1965, he was the second president following Matthew Simpson Davage, and shortly after the merger of Huston College and Tillotson College. He was succeeded as president by John Q. Taylor King.

== Death and legacy ==
He died May 1, 1975, while arguing before the Austin City Council on the naming of Austin's MLK Jr. Boulevard (formerly "19th Street"). In East Austin, east of Interstate 35 (a region historically populated primarily by minorities), the street was to be named MLK Jr. Blvd; west of I-35, it would remain 19th Street. Dr. Seabrook wanted there to be a single name in both East and West Austin. While speaking to the council of the need to unite the city, Dr. Seabrook collapsed, suffering a fatal heart attack.

On May 15, 2010, the same council approved naming of the MLK Jr. Boulevard bridge over I-35 after Seabrook. A $55,000 scholarship at Huston–Tillotson University has also been set up in Seabrook's name, $55,000 being the proposed cost of changing the road signs on the former 19th street to MLK Boulevard in 1975. This cost was one of the arguments at the time against changing the name of the road.
