= Robert Hayes =

Robert or Bob Hayes may refer to:

- Bob Hayes (1942–2002), Olympic gold-medal sprinter and receiver for the Dallas Cowboys
- Robert Hayes (legal scholar) (1942–2011), Australian law scholar
- Robert M. Hayes (information scientist) (1926–2022), American academic
- Robert Hayes (seismologist) (1900–1977), New Zealand astronomer, seismologist and organist
- Robert E. Hayes Jr. (born 1947), American bishop of the United Methodist Church
- Robert W. Hayes Jr. (born 1952), Republican member of the South Carolina Senate
- Robin Hayes (Robert Cannon Hayes, born 1945), politician from North Carolina
- Robert Seth Hayes, member of the Black Liberation Army
- Robert H. Hayes, American professor of business administration
- Robert M. Hayes (lawyer) (born 1952), American attorney, founder of the Coalition for the Homeless
- Robert Hayes (serial killer) (born 1982), American serial killer
- Robert Benjamin Hayes, (1876–?), American educator
- J. Robert Hayes (born 1932), member of the California State Assembly

== See also ==
- Robert Hay (disambiguation)
- Robert Hays (born 1947), American actor
- Robert Hays (c. 1758–1819), American settler of Nashville, Tennessee
