= James Polk (musician) =

American jazz pianist, arranger, and educator (1940–2024)

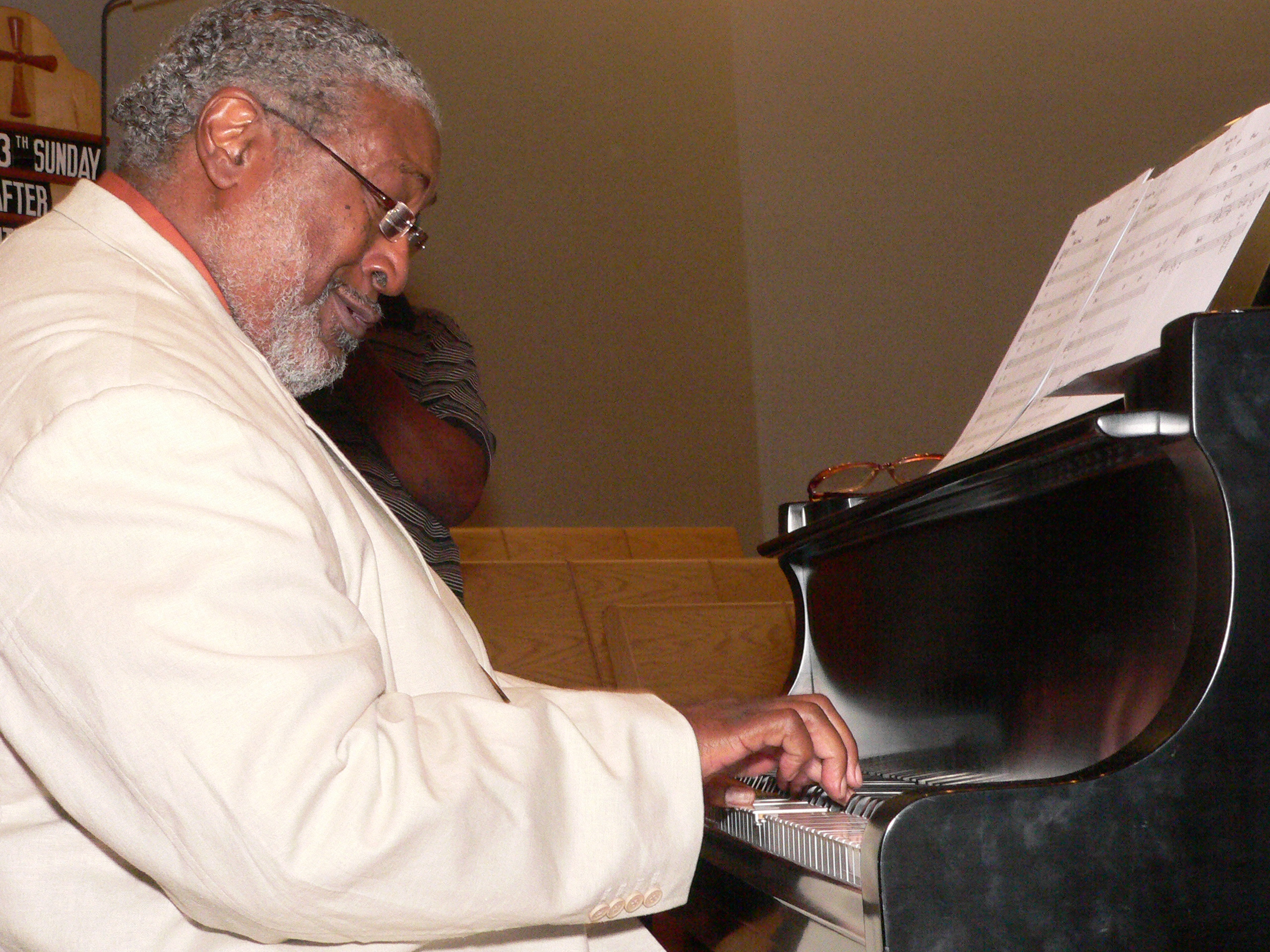
- Polk performing at a Kenny Dorham tribute concert at St. James Episcopal Church in Austin, Texas, 2009

Background information
- Born: James Edwin Polk; September 10, 1940; Yoakum, Texas, U.S.
- Died: June 21, 2024 (aged 83) Austin, Texas, U.S.
- Genres: Jazz, blues, soul
- Occupations: Musician, arranger, bandleader, educator
- Instruments: Piano, Hammond organ, trombone
- Years active: 1950s–2024

James Edwin Polk (September 10, 1940 – June 21, 2024) was an American jazz and blues pianist, Hammond organist, arranger, bandleader, and educator based in Austin, Texas who worked with Ray Charles as a pianist, organist, arranger, composer, and conductor. Over a career spanning more than five decades, Polk was widely regarded as one of the central figures in the development of the Austin jazz scene.

A performer, teacher, and mentor, Polk helped sustain Austin’s jazz community through his bands, educational work, and collaborations with younger musicians. He was inducted into the Austin Jazz Society Hall of Fame in 2016.

== Early life and education ==
Polk was born in Yoakum, Texas, and raised in Corpus Christi. He came from a musical family; his mother, Mattie Mae Polk, held a degree in music from St. Philip’s College in San Antonio and sang gospel professionally, while his father, Maryland Lethridge Polk Jr., was a self-taught pianist.

Polk began studying music at about eight years old, initially playing violin before switching to saxophone and later trombone in school bands. He continued playing trombone throughout middle school, high school, and college.

With his father’s encouragement, Polk began performing paid blues gigs at the age of thirteen. Growing up in Corpus Christi exposed him to a range of musical traditions including rhythm and blues, country music, and conjunto influences.

In 1958 he moved to Austin to attend Huston–Tillotson University (then Huston–Tillotson College), graduating in 1962 with a degree in music education. Although piano had long been present in his family home, Polk did not focus on it until after completing his undergraduate studies.

== Austin music scene and early career ==
When Polk arrived in Austin in 1958, much of the city’s jazz and rhythm-and-blues activity was concentrated in East Austin, where segregation had fostered a network of African-American clubs and venues.

Among the most prominent were Charlie’s Playhouse, Snookie’s Lounge, Shorty’s, and the Victory Grill, which hosted performances and jam sessions by local and touring musicians. These venues provided opportunities for young musicians such as Polk.

Polk later recalled that the East Austin club scene declined following desegregation in the 1960s as audiences increasingly frequented venues outside the neighborhood.

== James Polk & the Brothers ==
During his senior year at Huston–Tillotson, Polk formed the band James Polk & the Brothers as a vehicle for performing his compositions and arrangements.

Members of the group included trumpeter Martin Banks, guitarist W. C. Clark, vocalist Angela Strehli, guitarist John Reed, and keyboardist Matthew Robinson.

The group became known as one of the early integrated bands in Austin. The band toured throughout Texas, Oklahoma, and Louisiana and performed with blues guitarist Freddie King.

== Recording and label work ==
Polk founded the independent label Twink Records in the late 1960s in order to release his own recordings and those of local musicians. His group also recorded material for the Sonobeat label, an early Austin recording company associated with the city’s emerging music scene.

== Work with Ray Charles ==
In 1978 Polk received a phone call from Ray Charles inviting him to join the Ray Charles Orchestra. He joined the band soon afterward and remained associated with Charles for roughly a decade.

Initially hired as a pianist, Polk expanded his role to include organist, arranger, composer, and conductor. He toured internationally with Charles and contributed arrangements and performances to several recordings.

Polk received Grammy Award nominations for his arranging work on recordings including “Some Enchanted Evening” (1979) and “Born to Love Me” (1983).

== Later career and teaching ==
After leaving Ray Charles’ organization in the late 1980s, Polk returned to Austin. He pursued graduate study and later served as a lecturer in music history and jazz studies at Texas State University from 1990 to 1996.

Huston–Tillotson University awarded him an honorary Doctor of Music degree in 1995.

Polk continued performing regularly in Austin, leading the ensemble Centerpeace and performing with saxophonist Elias Haslanger in the ensemble Church on Monday.

== Style and philosophy ==
Polk’s playing blended jazz improvisation with blues, gospel, and soul influences and reflected the broader Texas jazz tradition associated with musicians such as David “Fathead” Newman, Arnett Cobb, Don Wilkerson, Russell Jacquet, and Ornette Coleman.

He frequently told students:

Don't forsake the groove. You've always got to make the music groove. Make it groove and make somebody else feel good by listening to your music.

== Legacy ==
Polk was widely regarded as one of the central figures in the development of modern jazz in Austin. In addition to performing throughout Texas and internationally, he mentored generations of younger musicians through teaching and community programs.

His ensemble Centerpeace often included emerging players who viewed him as both a bandleader and mentor.

== Honors and recognition ==
- Honorary Doctor of Music, Huston–Tillotson University (1995)
- Professor Emeritus of Jazz Studies, Texas State University (2007)
- Inducted into the Austin Music Awards Hall of Fame (1999)
- Inducted into the Austin Jazz Society Hall of Fame (2016)

== Discography ==
=== Albums ===
- You Know the Feeling…! – James Polk & Company (1984)
- When the Evening Comes (2001, Twink Records)
- Go with the Flow (2007, Twink Records)

== See also ==
- Music of Austin, Texas
- Victory Grill
