= Robert Hay =

Robert Hay may refer to:

- Robert Hay (Egyptologist) (1799–1863), Scottish Egyptologist
- Robert Hay (bishop of Buckingham) (1884–1973), bishop of Buckingham in the Church of England
- Robert Hay (bishop of Tasmania) (1867–1943), bishop of Tasmania in Anglican Church of Australia
- Robert Hay (furniture manufacturer) (1808–1890), Canadian furniture manufacturer and politician
- Robert Hay (rower) (1897–1968), Canadian Olympic rower
- Robert William Hay (1786–1861), Permanent Under-Secretary of State for the Colonies, 1825–1836
- Robert Hay-Drummond, 10th Earl of Kinnoull (1751–1804), peer of Scotland and Lord Lyon King of Arms
- Robert Hay (footballer) (1954–2025), Australian footballer for South Melbourne
- Robert Walker Hay (1934–1991), British chemist
- Sir Robert Hay, 8th Baronet (1825–1885)
- R. Couri Hay (born 1949), American publicist, blogger and gossip columnist
- Robert Hay (mayor), mayor of Reading 1399 and 1400
- Robert Hay (athlete) (1938–2022), Scottish runner
- Robert Hay (architect) (1799–1867) architect of several free churches including Dunfermline and Dollar, Clackmannanshire and also notable works to Fordell Castle

== See also ==
- Bob Hay (disambiguation)
- Robert Hayes (disambiguation)
- Robert Hays (born 1947), American actor
