= Pinckney Warren Russell =

American scholar, educator, pastor (1864–1941)

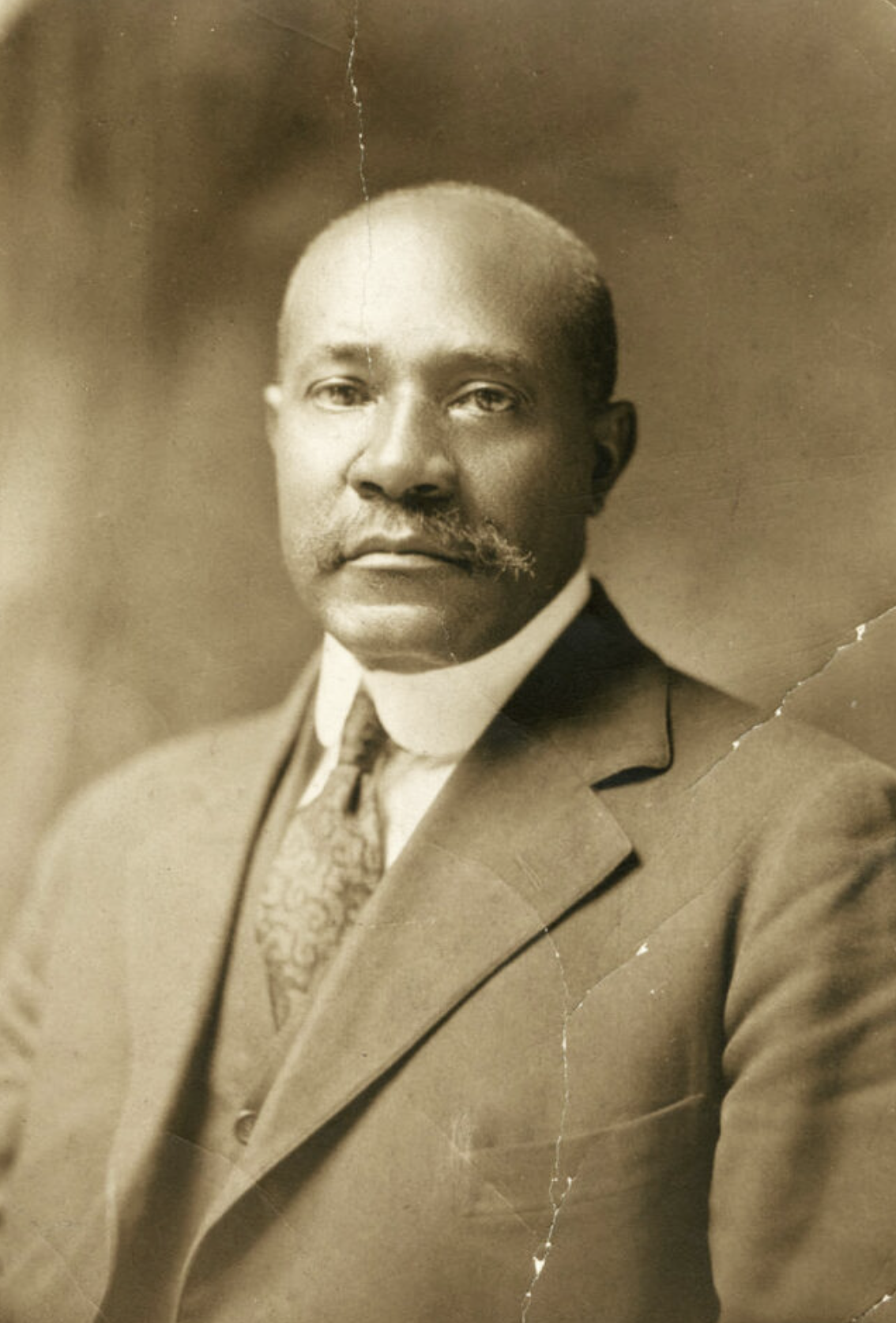
- Russell, circa 1920
- Born: April 25, 1864; Newberry County, South Carolina, United States
- Died: September 24, 1941 (aged 77); Charlotte, North Carolina, United States
- Education: Biddle University (B.A., B. Th., M.A.), Lincoln University (D.D.)
- Occupations: Classics scholar, Presbyterian pastor, educator
- Spouse: Hattie E. Field (1894–)
- Children: 6

Pinckney Warren Russell (April 25, 1864–September 24, 1941) was an American classics scholar, Presbyterian pastor, and educator. He was a department chair and taught Greek at Biddle University (now Johnson C. Smith University) in Charlotte, North Carolina, and was an early African American Classicist in North Carolina.

== Early life and education ==
Pinckney Warren Russell was born on April 25, 1864, in Newberry County, South Carolina, to parents Rachel (née Williams) and Madison Russell. When he was young it was the Reconstruction era in the U.S., and he struggled to find educational opportunities as a Black child. Russell attended Hoge School for Colored Children in the city of Newberry in South Carolina. His parents died young and he worked at a cotton factory at Pelzer, South Carolina.

Russell received a 1890 B.A. degree with honors from the normal school at Biddle University (now Johnson C. Smith University), followed by a 1893 B. Th. degree, and a M.A. degree at the same university. He continued his studies at Lincoln University near Oxford, Pennsylvania and received a D.D. degree.

== Career ==
He served as a Presbyterian pastor in Biddleville, an historically African-American neighborhood in Charlotte, North Carolina, followed by pastorate in Goldsboro, North Carolina. He served as the principal at the State Normal School in Goldsboro.

For one term he returned to Biddle University as an assistant teacher in the college preparatory department, and three terms after he served as the principal of that department from 1899 to 1908. He was promoted to the department chair for the Greek department at Biddle University. He taught ancient Greek literature and New Testament Greek. He worked as the dean of faculty from 1921 to 1922, and the dean of the school of arts at Biddle University from 1922 to 1926. He left teaching in 1938.

Russell and Hattie E. Field married on December 19, 1894. His wife was an accomplished educator. Together they had six children.

He was a member of the Classics Association of the Middle West and South starting in 1917.

== Death ==
He died on September 24, 1941, in Charlotte, North Carolina. In April 1953, Johnson C. Smith University held a special memorial event at Biddle Memorial Chapel for seven deceased faculty, which included Russell.

== See also ==
- Reuben Shannon Lovinggood
- John W. E. Bowen Sr.
