= 1903 Lincoln Tigers football team =

American college football season

1903 Lincoln Tigers football
- Conference: Independent
- Record: 1–1
- Captain: Smith

1903 Midwestern college football independents records
	Conf.			Overall
Team	W	L	T	W		L		T
Nebraska		–		11	–	0	–	0
North Dakota		–		7	–	0	–	0
Central Michigan		–		6	–	0	–	0
Notre Dame		–		8	–	0	–	1
Iowa State		–		8	–	1	–	0
Marquette		–		7	–	1	–	0
Lake Forest		–		6	–	1	–	0
North Dakota Agricultural		–		5	–	1	–	0
Haskell		–		7	–	2	–	0
St. Xavier		–		7	–	2	–	0
Fairmount		–		6	–	2	–	0
Wabash		–		9	–	3	–	0
Wittenberg		–		5	–	2	–	1
Doane		–		2	–	1	–	0
Northern Illinois State		–		4	–	2	–	0
American Medical		–		6	–	3	–	0
Kansas		–		6	–	3	–	0
Drake		–		5	–	3	–	0
Kirksville Osteopaths		–		5	–	3	–	0
Iowa State Normal		–		4	–	3	–	1
Ohio Medical		–		5	–	4	–	0
Lincoln (MO)		–		1	–	1	–	0
Michigan State Normal		–		4	–	4	–	0
Washington University		–		4	–	4	–	2
Heidelberg		–		3	–	4	–	2
Kansas State		–		3	–	4	–	1
Detroit College		–		3	–	4	–	0
Shurtleff		–		2	–	4	–	1
Ohio		–		2	–	4	–	0
South Dakota Agricultural		–		1	–	2	–	0
Mount Union		–		2	–	5	–	1
DePauw		–		2	–	6	–	1
Miami (OH)		–		1	–	4	–	0
Missouri		–		1	–	7	–	1
Western Illinois		–		0	–	3	–	1
Cincinnati		–		1	–	8	–	0
Baldwin–Wallace		–		0	–	1	–	0
Buchtel		–		0	–	2	–	0
Butler		–		0	–	3	–	0
Chicago P&S		–		0	–	4	–	0

The 1903 Lincoln Tigers football team represented Lincoln Institute—now known as Lincoln University—in Jefferson City, Missouri as an independent during the 1903 college football season. The Lincoln football team played two games during the season, finishing with a 1–1 record.

The first game of the season went in favor of Lincoln, as Columbia high school was beaten, 11–5. The final game of the season was played against the George R. Smith College Deweys. The Deweys won the game, however there were widespread allegations against the integrity of the George R. Smith football team. Reportedly, the Deweys treated the Lincoln football team with such brutality, that it culminated with gunshots and physical altercations. As a result, the Lincoln team quit after the first half of the game due to safety concerns.

In the early days of college football, segregation often barred HBCU's from competing with predominantly white institutions. Of the three HBCU's that existed in Missouri at that time, only Lincoln and George R. Smith College fielded football teams. This situation paved the way for an intense rivalry between the two HBCU's. An annually scheduled game against the only other in-state HBCU, resulted in the first attempt to crown an HBCU champion in the region.

As there was not a system in place at the time to crown a national champion, what resulted were unique playoff situations for many HBCU's. As early as 1902, the annual Lincoln–George R. Smith game was promoted as the HBCU football championship of Missouri. Regardless of whether the annual game was played for a championship title prior to 1902, it was certainly among the earliest de facto HBCU football championships in the region.

== Schedule ==
Date	Opponent	Site	Result	Source
October 26	Columbia High School	Unknown	W 11–5	
November 21	at George R. Smith	Liberty Park; Sedalia, MO	L 0–17	
