= Bob Hay =

Bob Hay may refer to:

- Bob Hay (musician), American singer and songwriter
- Bob Hay (general) (1920–1998), Australian army general and VFL footballer
- Bob Hay (footballer, born 1880) (1880–1959), Australian rules footballer for Fitzroy
- Bob Hay (footballer, born 1938), Australian rules footballer for St Kilda, see List of St Kilda Football Club players

== See also ==
- Bob Haigh (born 1943), English rugby league footballer and coach
- Robert Hay (disambiguation)
