= Myrtle Craig Mowbray =

American educator

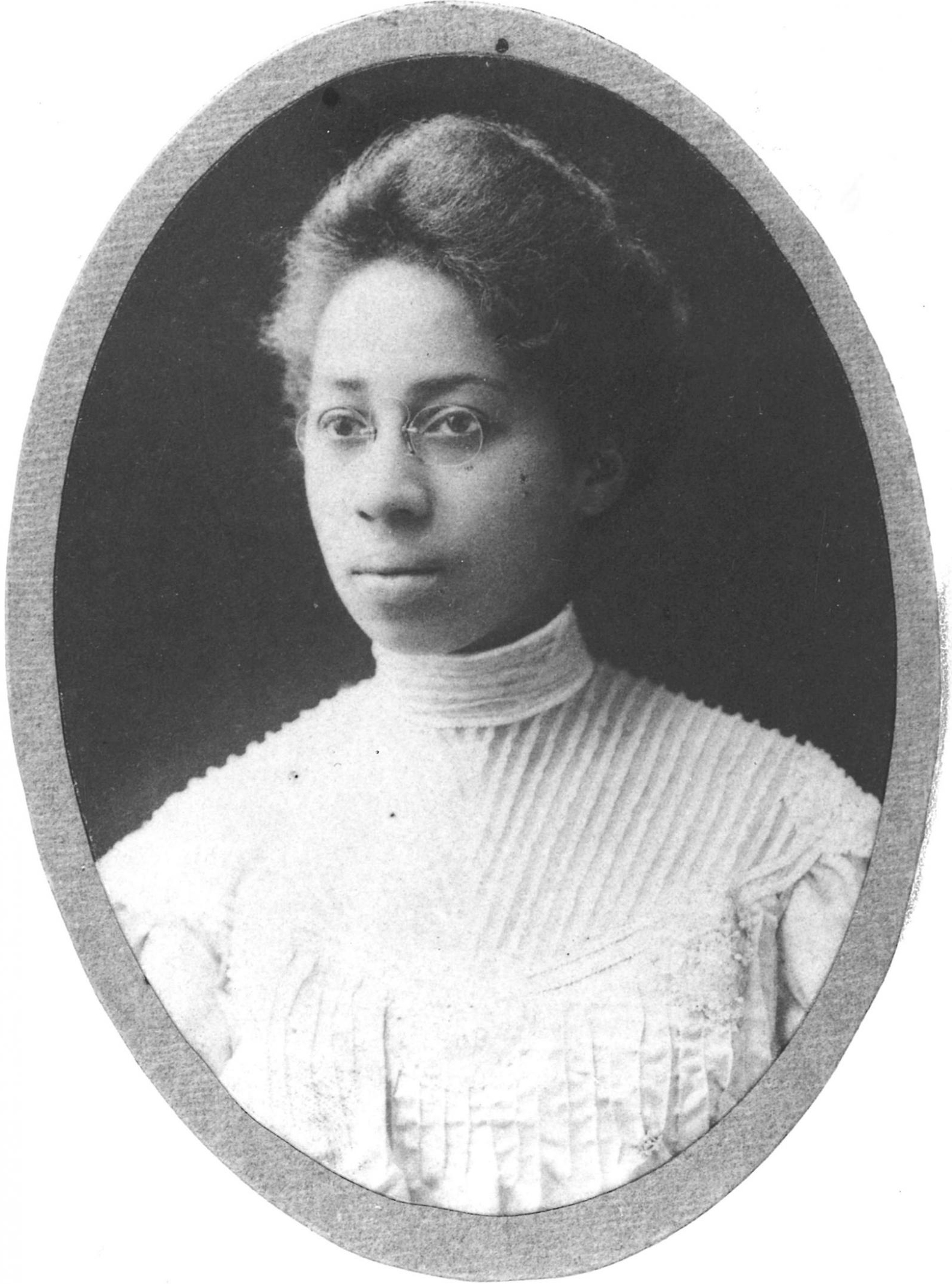
- Born: March 16, 1883; Adrian, Michigan
- Died: November 8, 1974 (aged 91)
- Education: George R. Smith College; Michigan Agricultural College
- Employer(s): Western University, Lincoln Institute, Sumner High School

Myrtle Craig Mowbray (March 16, 1883 – November 8, 1974), formerly Myrtle Craig, was the first African-American woman to graduate from the Michigan Agricultural College (later Michigan State University) in 1907. She was later a schoolteacher and a professor at two historically black colleges and universities in Kansas and Missouri. The Mowbray Scholars Program at the Michigan State University Honors College is named in her honor.

== Early life ==
Mowbray was born in Adrian, Michigan. Her father was a messenger for the secretary of state in Lansing, the state capital. Prior to her arrival in East Lansing, she graduated from George R. Smith College in Sedalia, Missouri, and for a year was an elementary schoolteacher in Missouri.

== Michigan Agricultural College ==
Myrtle Craig's father persuaded her to attend the Michigan Agricultural College (M.A.C.) over the University of Michigan. Craig worked her way through college by waiting tables and working other side jobs, and did not live in the Women's Building on campus, either because she was not allowed to or could not afford to. She first boarded with the family of Addison M. Brown, who was the secretary to the State Board of Agriculture, and worked for the family as a cook; she later boarded with the family of assistant professor of Drawing Chace Newman before taking up residence in Lansing. She was one of four African American students on campus and, of those, the only woman, and was one of 15 women in the class of 1907. While Craig was one of the few African Americans at the university, she reflected on her experience by saying, "I didn't feel any different because of my race, there were sororities for girls, but I was so poor, I didn't have the time or money for those things." During her time of study, she was affiliated with the A.M.E. Church in Lansing. She received her diploma on May 31, 1907, from U.S. President Theodore Roosevelt, the commencement speaker.

== Teaching career ==
After graduating from the Michigan Agricultural College, Craig spent her next forty years teaching African American youth in Kansas and Missouri. From 1907 to 1910 she taught at Western University in Quindaro, Kansas, then taught domestic art for two years at Lincoln Institute in Jefferson City, Missouri, during which time she exhibited at the 1911 Missouri State Fair, winning a blue ribbon and other prizes for work in domestic arts. She then taught for three years at Sumner High School in Kansas City, Kansas; returned to teaching at Lincoln Institute from 1917 to 1922; taught elementary school in Fulton, Missouri, from 1922 to 1934; and again at Lincoln Institute from 1934 to 1947.

== Personal life ==
Craig married Rev. W.H. Bowen in 1915, and married George H. Mowbray in 1951. At the time of her death on November 8, 1974, she lived in Kansas City, Missouri.
