= Anthony and Louise Viaer Alumni Hall =

- Administration Building
- U.S. National Register of Historic Places
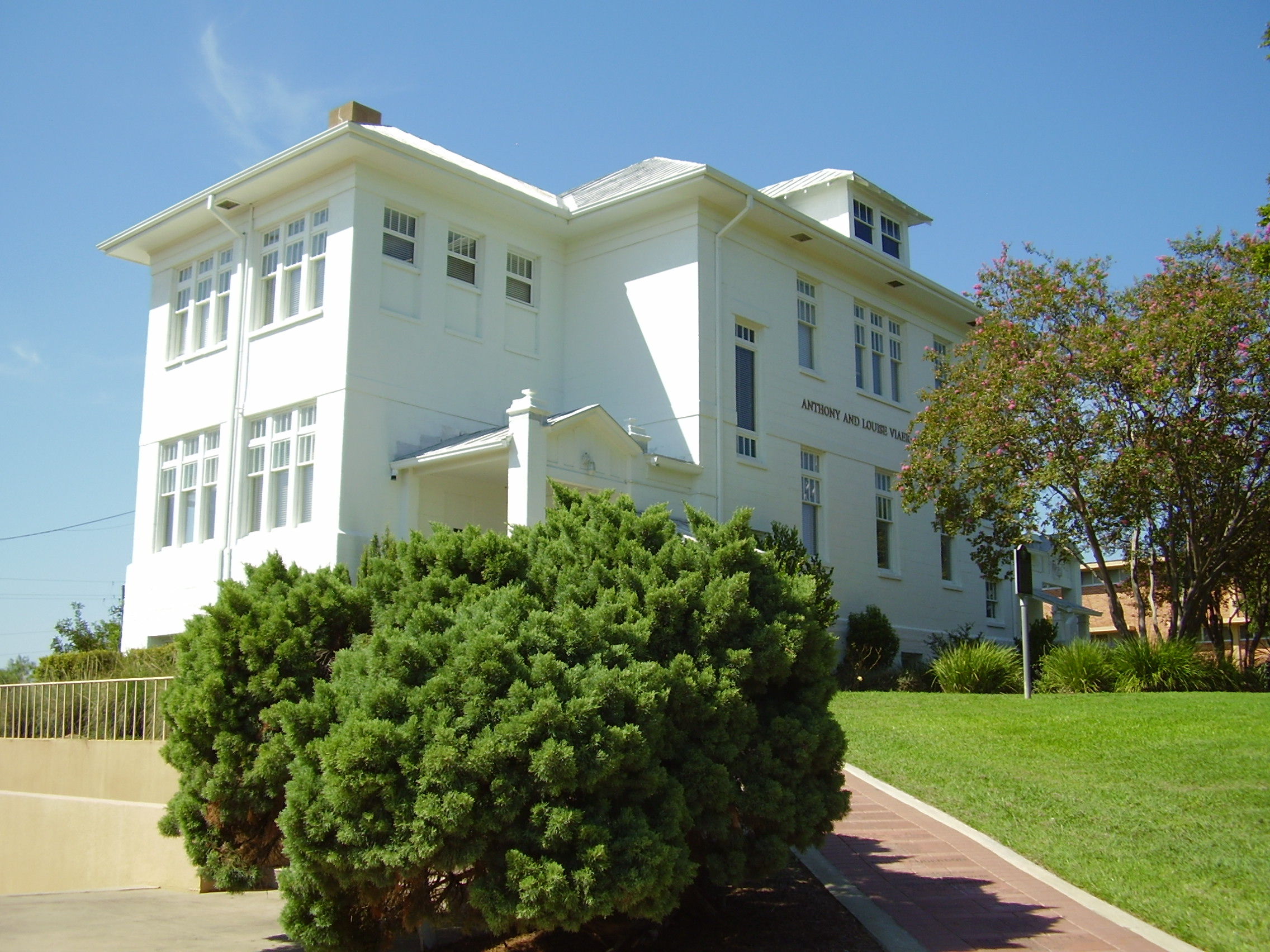
- Anthony and Louise Viaer Alumni Hall

- Location within Texas Location within the United States
- Location: 1820 E. Eighth St., Austin, Texas
- Coordinates: 30°15′55″N 97°43′21″W
- Area: less than one acre
- Built: 1914
- Architectural style: Prairie School
- MPS: East Austin MRA
- NRHP reference No.: 86003845
- Added to NRHP: October 21, 1993

The Anthony and Louise Viaer Alumni Hall, formerly the Administration Building, is a building on the campus of Huston–Tillotson University in Austin, Texas, United States.

Constructed in 1914 in the Prairie School style, it was built of bricks manufactured by Huston–Tillotson students.

The building was named after Anthony E. Viaer, an alumnus of the Class of 1958 who gave a $1 million scholarship opportunity to university students.

The building was first nominated for National Register listing in 1986, but was not then listed, due to owner objection. It was listed in 1993.
