= Mary Elizabeth Branch =

American educator, college president (1881–1944)

11th President of Tillotson College
- In office 1930–1944
- Preceded by: J. T. Hodges
- Succeeded by: William H. Jones

Personal details
- Born: May 29, 1881 Farmville, Virginia, U.S.
- Died: July 6, 1944 (aged 63) Baltimore, Maryland, U.S.
- Parent: Tazewell Branch (father)
- Education: Virginia State College (BA); University of Chicago (MA)

Mary Elizabeth Branch (May 29, 1881 – July 6, 1944) was an American educator and academic administrator. She was Black, and served as president of Tillotson College (now Huston–Tillotson University), a HBCU in Austin, Texas. She was the first female president for the college.

== Early life and education ==
Branch was born on May 29, 1881, in Farmville, Virginia, to formerly enslaved parents Tazewell Branch and Harriet Branch. Her father served two terms the Virginia House of Delegates. Both her parents were literate, and taught Mary at home, though she also attended school.

After high school she earned her teaching degree at Virginia State College (now Virginia State University), and taught at an elementary school in Blackstone, Virginia.

== Professional career ==
Branch returned to Virginia State College to teach; she stayed there for twenty years, and at the same time earned a BA (1922) and then an MA (1925) from the University of Chicago.

After Virginia State College, Branch became a dean at Vashon High School in St Louis. After that she became president at Tillotson College in Austin, Texas, where she stayed until retirement. The college had seen enrollment decline, and the year before Branch's arrival it was demoted to a junior college for women. Branch had new buildings built and existing ones renovated. The library was enlarged, and so was the number of teachers. With a successful recruitment strategy, aided by her ability to raise funds, she managed to grow enrollment from less than 150 in 1930 to 500. She also strengthened ties with the community.

After five years, Tillotson became a co-ed four-year college and joined the American Association of Colleges. Branch was the first and only African American female president of an institution in this Association. In 1944, she assisted in establishing the United Negro College Fund (UNCF) and served as President of the Austine chapter. Branch was a member of Alpha Kappa Alpha.

She died in 1944 in Baltimore, Maryland.

== Awards ==
In 1935, Lyndon B. Johnson appointed her to the National Youth's Administration's Negro Advisory Board for Texas. At her alma mater, Virginia State University named a residence after Branch. Branch was awarded degrees of honor from Virginia State College and Howard University.

== See also ==
- List of presidents of Huston–Tillotson University
