= Matthew Simpson Davage =

American academic administrator (1879–1976)

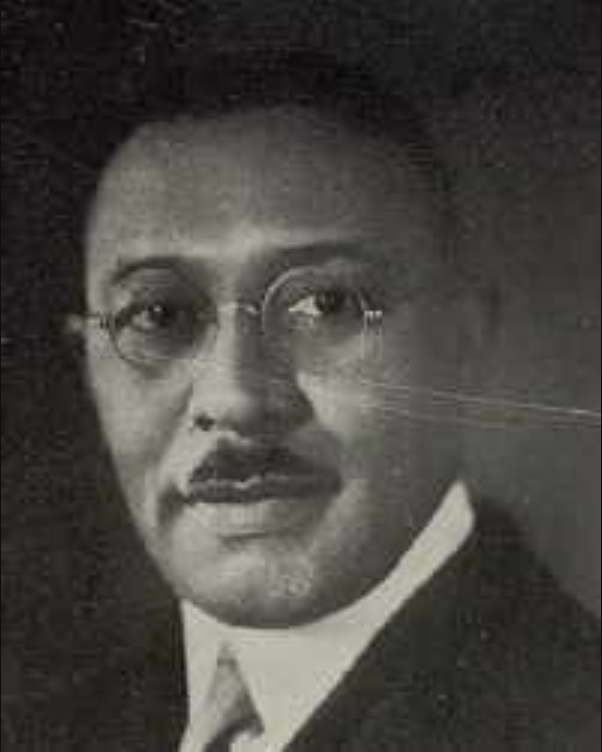
- Davage in 1926

7th President of George R. Smith College
- In office 1915–1916
- Preceded by: George Evans
- Succeeded by: Robert B. Hayes

6th President of Haven Institute
- In office 1916–1917

5th President of Samuel Huston College
- In office 1917–1920

President of Rust College
- In office 1920–1924

16th President of Clark College
- In office 1924–1941

1st President of Huston-Tillotson University
- In office 1952–1955

Personal details
- Born: June 16, 1879 Shreveport, Louisiana, U.S.
- Died: September 20, 1976 (aged 97) New Orleans, Louisiana, U.S.
- Spouse: Alice Vera Armstead
- Education: University of Chicago, Columbia University
- Alma mater: New Orleans University
- Occupation: College and university president, educator, businessperson, minister

Rev. Matthew Simpson Davage (June 16, 1879 – September 20, 1976) also known as M. S. Davage, was an American educator, college and university president, businessperson, and minister. He served as president of George R. Smith College (from 1914 to 1916); Haven Institute (from 1916 to 1917); Samuel Huston College (from 1917 to 1920); Rust College (from 1920 to 1924); and Clark College (from 1924 to 1941).

== Biography ==
Matthew Simpson Davage on June 16, 1879, was born in Shreveport, Louisiana, to parents Harriet (née Lee) and Rev. Samuel Davage. The family moved to New Orleans when he went to college, where his father served as the pastor for the Methodist Episcopal Church.

Davage studied in the classical department at New Orleans University (now Dillard University). While attending college, he played baseball on the University Nine baseball team and he started teaching in the evenings. He graduated in 1900 with a B.A. degree, and in 1907 with a M. A. degree; after in which he began teaching mathematics and Latin. Davage did a period of postgraduate study at the University of Chicago, and at Columbia University. He married Alice Vera Armstead in 1904.

Davage was business manager for the Southwestern Christian Advocate newspaper from 1905 to 1915. He served as president of George R. Smith College (from 1914 to 1916); Haven Institute (from 1916 to 1917); the first president of Samuel Huston College (from 1917 to 1920, now Huston–Tillotson University); the president of Rust College (from 1920 to 1924); and Clark College (from 1924 to 1941, now Clark Atlanta University). He was the first Black president of Rust College, a private historically black college in Holly Springs, Mississippi.

He was active within the Methodist church both nationally and internationally, and served as a Methodist Episcopal Church elder statesman and educator. He was friends with George Washington Carver, Booker T. Washington, and Paul Laurence Dunbar. Within his lifetime, Davage observed the political changes from Black enslavement and being interposed, to a transformation towards the American civil rights movement.

== Death and legacy ==
He died on September 20, 1976, in a hospital in New Orleans. The Davage Auditorium (1954) at Clark University was dedicated to him.

The Amistad Research Center at Tulane University has a collection of his papers. The Schomburg Center for Research in Black Culture at the New York Public Library has a photograph of Davage published in 1922. In 1939, he corresponded with W. E. B. Du Bois who sent him an autographed copy of Du Bois' speech "The Revelation of St. Orgne the Damned", which is now part of the archives at University of Massachusetts Amherst. He was photographed at the charter signing of Huston-Tillotson College on October 24, 1952, which is now part of the Huston-Tillotson University Downs-Jones Library Archives and Special Collections in Austin, Texas.

== See also ==
- List of presidents of Clark Atlanta University
- List of presidents of Huston–Tillotson University
