= Reuben Shannon Lovinggood =

American educator (1864–1916)

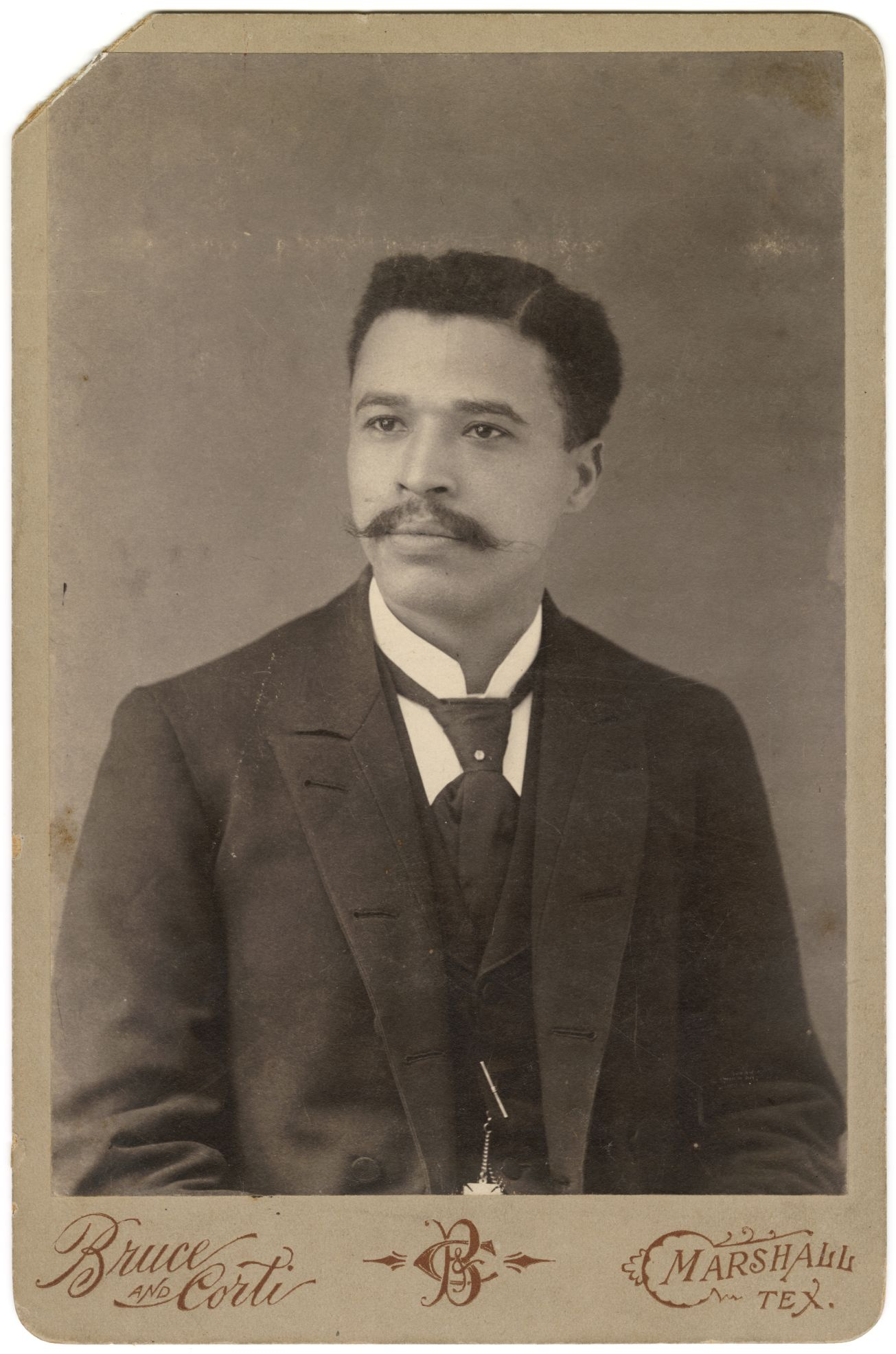

3rd President of Samuel Huston College
- Preceded by: Thomas M. Dart
- Succeeded by: J. W. Frazier

Personal details
- Born: May 2, 1864 Walhalla, Oconee County, South Carolina, U.S.
- Died: December 17, 1916 (aged 52) Austin, Travis County, Texas, U.S.
- Resting place: Oakwood Cemetery
- Spouse(s): Lillie G. England, Madeleine Alice Townsend
- Education: University of Chicago
- Alma mater: Clark College
- Occupation: Educator, newspaper editor, college president, religious leader

Reuben Shannon Lovinggood (May 2, 1864 – December 17, 1916), was an American newspaper editor, classical scholar, educator, and college president. He served as the third president of Samuel Huston College (now known as Huston-Tillotson University) from 1900 to 1916. He was the editor and partial owner of the Atlanta Times newspaper from 1890 to 1892. Lovinggood was a professor of Latin and Greek courses from 1895 until 1900 at Wiley College in Marshall, Texas. He was an active member of the Methodist Episcopal Church.

His son Penman Lovingood became a composer and memoir writer; who authored the book about his father, Negro Seer: The Life and Work of Dr. R.S. Lovingood [sic] Educator, Churchman, Race Leader (1963).

== See also ==
- List of presidents of Huston–Tillotson University
- John W. E. Bowen Sr.
- Pinckney Warren Russell
