= George R. Smith College =

Defunct Black college in Sedalia, Missouri, US

Coordinates: 38.72°N 93.22°W

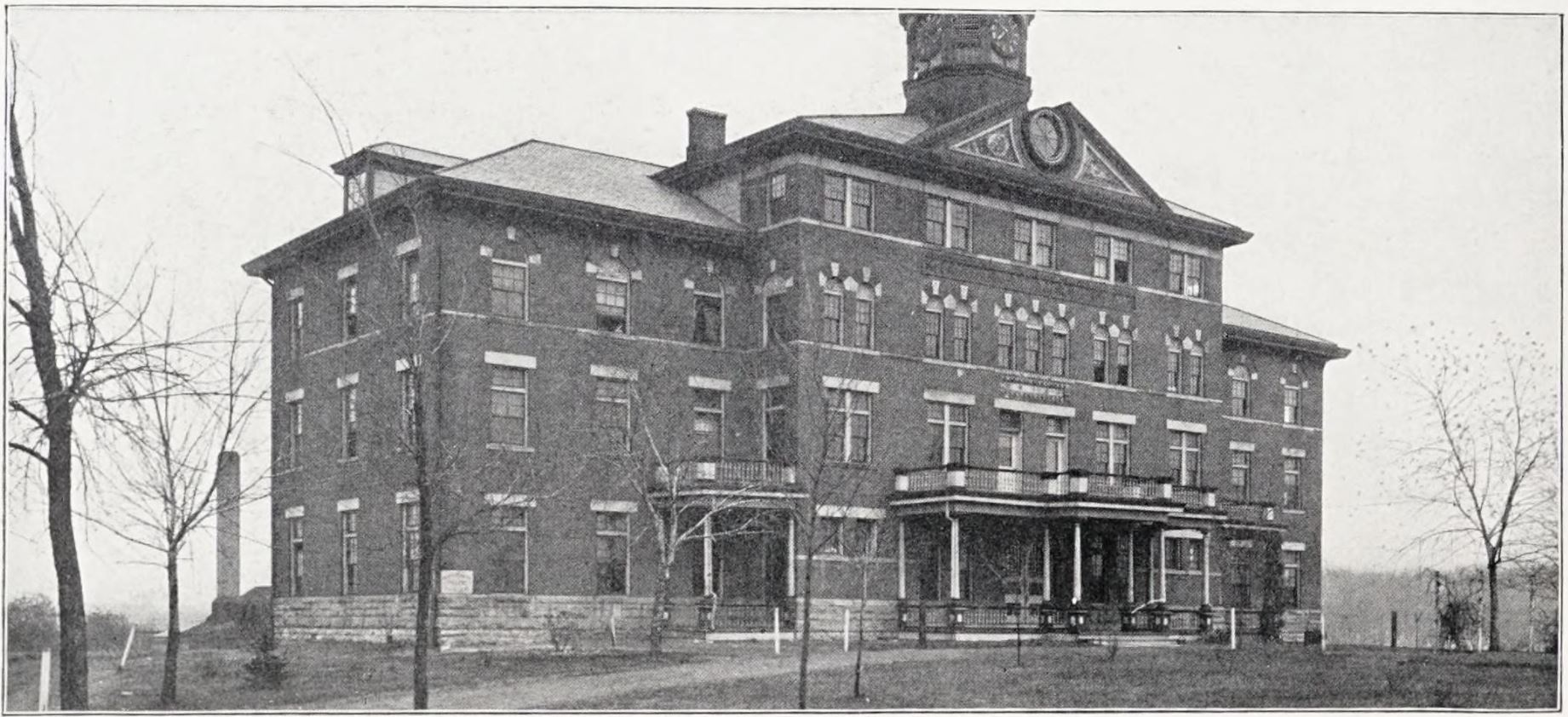
- Active: 1894–1925
- Location: Sedalia, Missouri, U.S.
- Colors: Purple and white
- Nickname: Deweys

George R. Smith College (1894–1925) was a private historically black college, located in Sedalia, Missouri, United States. It was attended by ragtime composer Scott Joplin. It burned down in 1925, and by 1933 the assets were merged with the Philander Smith College in Little Rock, Arkansas.

== History ==
The institution was associated with the Freedmen's Aid and Southern Education Society of the Methodist Church and played an important role in the lives of young people for several decades.

According to the Encyclopedia of the History of Missouri edited by Howard L. Conard, the building was completed in 1882. The college operated from 1894 until it burned down on April 26, 1925, after which its assets were merged with the Philander Smith College in 1933. A photograph of George R. Smith College, with students, can be found among at the State Historical Society of Missouri.

== Notable alumni ==
- Myrtle Craig Mowbray, first African American woman to graduate from Michigan State University, in 1907
- Scott Joplin, ragtime music piano composer, who was famous for the piano music piece "Maple Leaf Rag."
- Arthur Marshall, ragtime composer and contemporary of Scott Joplin
- Homer G. Phillips, prominent lawyer and civil rights advocate
- T. Manuel Smith, president of the National Medical Association (1942 to 1943)

== Presidents ==
- P. A. Cool, 1894–1897
- E. A. Robertson, 1897–1902
- I. L. Lowe, 1902–1907
- A. C. Maclin, 1907–1910
- J. C. Sherrill, 1910–1912
- George Evans, 1912–1914
- Matthew Simpson Davage, 1914–1916
- Robert B. Hayes, 1916–1925

== Athletics ==
Throughout the history of the college, various men and women's sports teams were fielded. Athletic teams from George R. Smith were known as the Deweys. Their colors were purple and white. Men had the opportunity to play football, baseball, basketball and tennis, while women could participate in sports such as basketball, tennis, croquet, and swings.

The 1903 George R. Smith Deweys football team won the black football championship of Missouri. In the championship-deciding game, the Deweys defeated the Lincoln Tigers of Lincoln Institute in Jefferson City, Missouri by a score of 17–0. The game was reportedly brutal and controversial.
