= Lillie England Lovinggood =

African-American writer and teacher

- Born: Lillie G. England; 1871; Louisville, Kentucky, U.S.
- Died: January 1896 (aged 24–25)
- Occupations: teacher and writer
- Spouse: Reuben Shannon Lovinggood

Lillie England Lovinggood (1871 – January 1896) was an African-American teacher and writer.

== Biography ==
Lillie G. England was born in 1871 in Louisville, Kentucky. She attended public schools there, and then studied at Knoxville College, a historically black college founded in 1875. In 1889 she won the college's A. E. T. Draper medal for general scholarship and elocution. After graduating, she taught school in Birmingham, Alabama. In 1894, she passed an examination which granted her a life-time license to teach in Alabama. On December 26, 1894, England married Reuben Shannon Lovinggood, the principal of Cameron Public School, in Birmingham, Alabama.

James T. Haley included Lovinggood's 1894 address "Woman's Work in the Elevation of the Race" in his Afro-American Encyclopaedia (1895). In the address, Lovinggood argues that this is no difference between "Jews or Gentiles, black or white, male or female," and that elevation of one will uplift all. She suggests that women have historically been restricted in their "sphere of action" by men who have "had a monopoly of everything," but that some women have nevertheless "surmounted almost insuperable barriers and are now taken for their true worth." She advocates for women to work for the betterment of humanity both inside and outside the home, to "study medicine, law, music, elocution and become the best in those professions." For role models, Lovinggood points to women's work in medicine, anti-slavery campaigns, and suffrage.

Lovinggood died in January, 1896, ten days after giving birth to a son.
