= Melva K. Wallace =

American academic administrator

7th President of Huston-Tillotson University
- Incumbent
- Assumed office August 15, 2022
- Preceded by: Archibald W. Vanderpuye (interim)

Personal details
- Spouse: D.L. Wallace
- Education: Grambling State University; Jackson State University

Melva K. Wallace (née Turner) is an American academic administrator specialized in emotional intelligence development. She has served as the seventh president and chief executive officer of Huston–Tillotson University since 2022.

== Life ==
Wallace earned a B.A. (1999) in mass communication and a M.A. (2001) in public administration from Grambling State University. She received a Ph.D. in urban higher education at Jackson State University in 2008. Her dissertation was titled, How African American Students from Rural Communities Choose College.

Wallace was a professor and associate dean at Centenary College of Louisiana. She worked at the Southern University System as an assistant vice president for academic and student affairs. She was also the first chief of staff to manage five campuses. She was an administrator at Grambling State University.

Wallace is trained in emotional intelligence development. She was a senior director of programming for the Clinton Presidential Center. In 2022, Wallace was the vice chancellor for student affairs and enrollment management at Southern University at Shreveport.

On August 15, 2022, she became the seventh president and chief executive office of Huston–Tillotson University. Succeeding interim president Archibald W. Vanderpuye, Wallace is its second female president.
