= Haven Institute and Conservatory of Music =

American college (1865–c. 1930s)

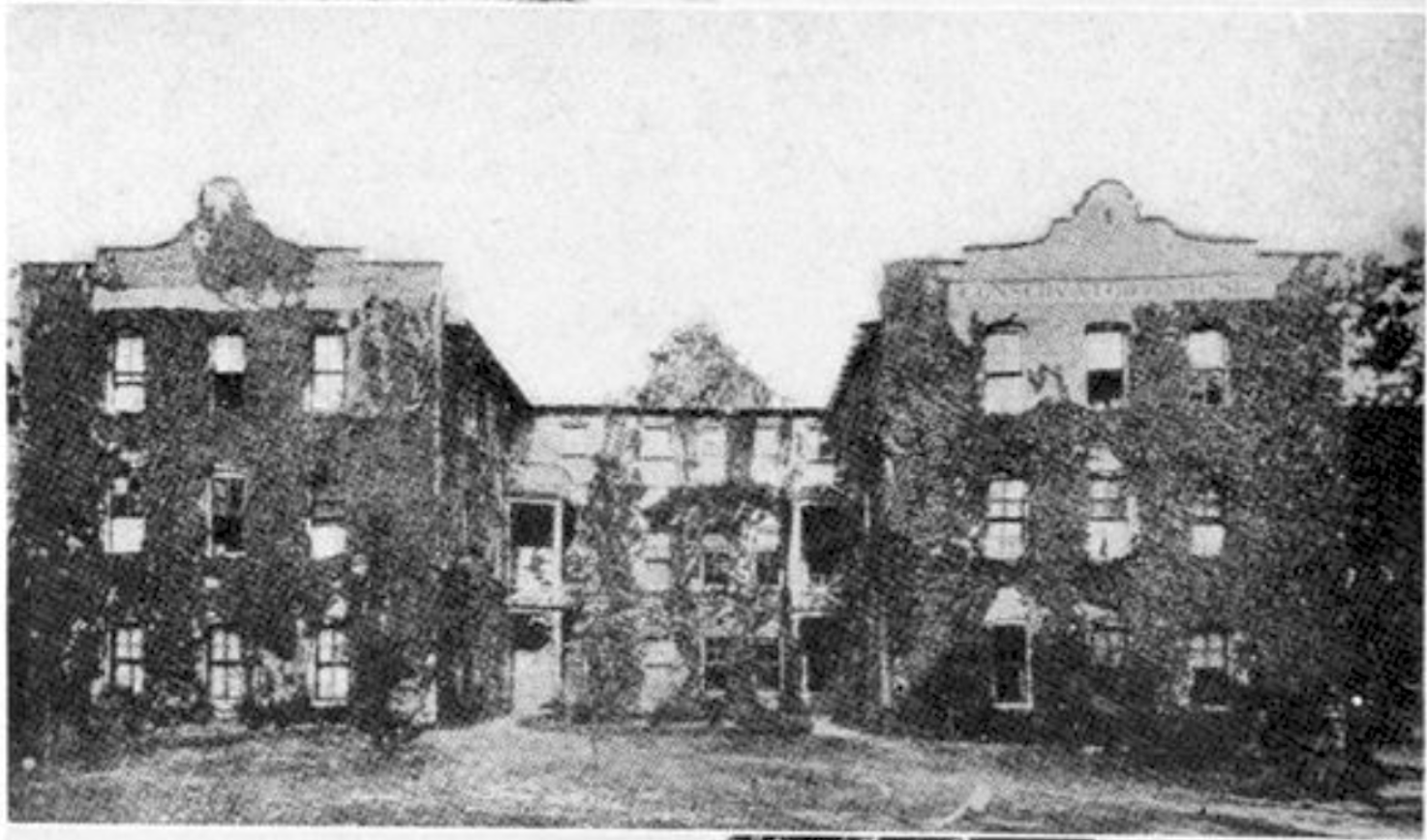
- image from 1922
- Former names: Meridian Academy, Haven Institute
- Type: Private, historically black
- Active: 1865–early 1930s
- Founders: Moses Austin
- Affiliations: Clark University (1921–early 1930s)
- Religious affiliation: Methodist Episcopal Church
- Location: Meridian, Mississippi, U.S. 32.369627°N 88.705044°W

Haven Institute and Conservatory of Music, also known simply as Haven Institute, was an American private historically black Methodist college active from 1865 until the early-1930s, located in Meridian, Mississippi. It was founded in 1865 by Moses Austin, a pastor of the Saint Paul Methodist Episcopal Church of Meridian and a formerly enslaved person. Originally it was called Meridian Academy and it was located at 27th Avenue and 13th Street in Waynesboro, Georgia, however the name changed in 1914 and the campus moved in 1921.

== History ==
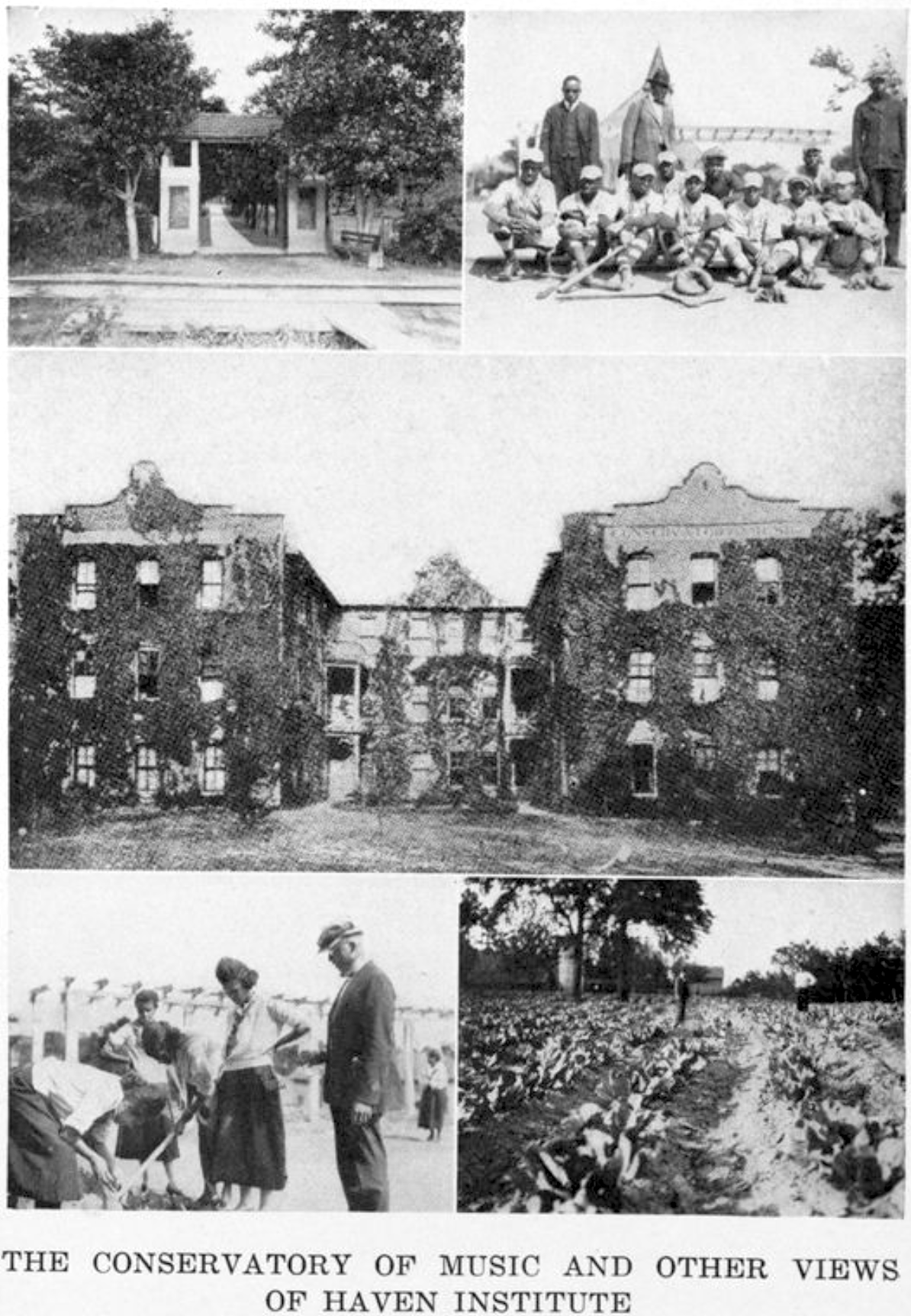
Haven Institute, 1922

The Meridian Academy was founded in 1865 by Moses Austin, a formerly enslaved person and a pastor of the Saint Paul Methodist Episcopal Church of Meridian. It initially was located at 27th Avenue and 13th Street in Waynesboro, Georgia. The school was formed by the Board of Education for Negroes of the Methodist Episcopal Church (originally the Freedmen's Aid Society). The school name was changed to Haven Institute in 1914 when Haven Academy of Waynesboro, Georgia merged with Clark University of Atlanta, Georgia.

A 1917 report published by the United States Office of Education stated the school spent too much time teaching "ancient languages," and recommended more industrial education programs such as cooking, sewing, and gardening.

The school's growth was hampered for lack of adequate room for expansion for classrooms and dormitories, forcing it to turn down applicants. To remedy this, in 1921 the Board of Education for Negroes of the Methodist Episcopal Church purchased the 100-acre campus of the defunct Meridian Female College a mile outside of the city. A large conservatory of music was included, with a pipe organ, numerous pianos and other musical equipment, and the school opened the Haven Conservatory of Music, directed by the Rev. William A. Sykes. The original building was sold to the church.

The school closed in the early-1930s because of financial pressures caused by the Great Depression.

== Presidents ==
- Moses Austin
- J. H. Brooks
- J. L. Wilson
- W. W. Lucas
- J. B. F. Shaw
- Matthew Simpson Davage, from 1916 to 1917
- R. N. Brooks
- J. B. F. Shaw
