= Downs Field =

Baseball venue in Austin, Texas, US

- Interactive map of Downs Field
- Address: 2816 E. 12th Street; Austin, Texas; United States
- Coordinates: 30°16′34″N 97°42′34″W
- Owner: Huston–Tillotson University

Construction
- Opened: 1914
- Renovated: 1938, 1954

Tenants
- Austin Black Senators, Austin Public Schools

Downs Field is a baseball venue located in Austin, Texas, and the home of the Huston–Tillotson University Rams baseball team. Downs Field was once the home of the Austin Black Senators and also was the home ballpark of Samuel Huston College before it combined with Tillotson College as one unified college in 1952. Some notable names that have taken the field at Downs Field were Satchel Paige, Willie Wells, Smokey Joe Williams, Willie Mays, and Buck O'Neil.

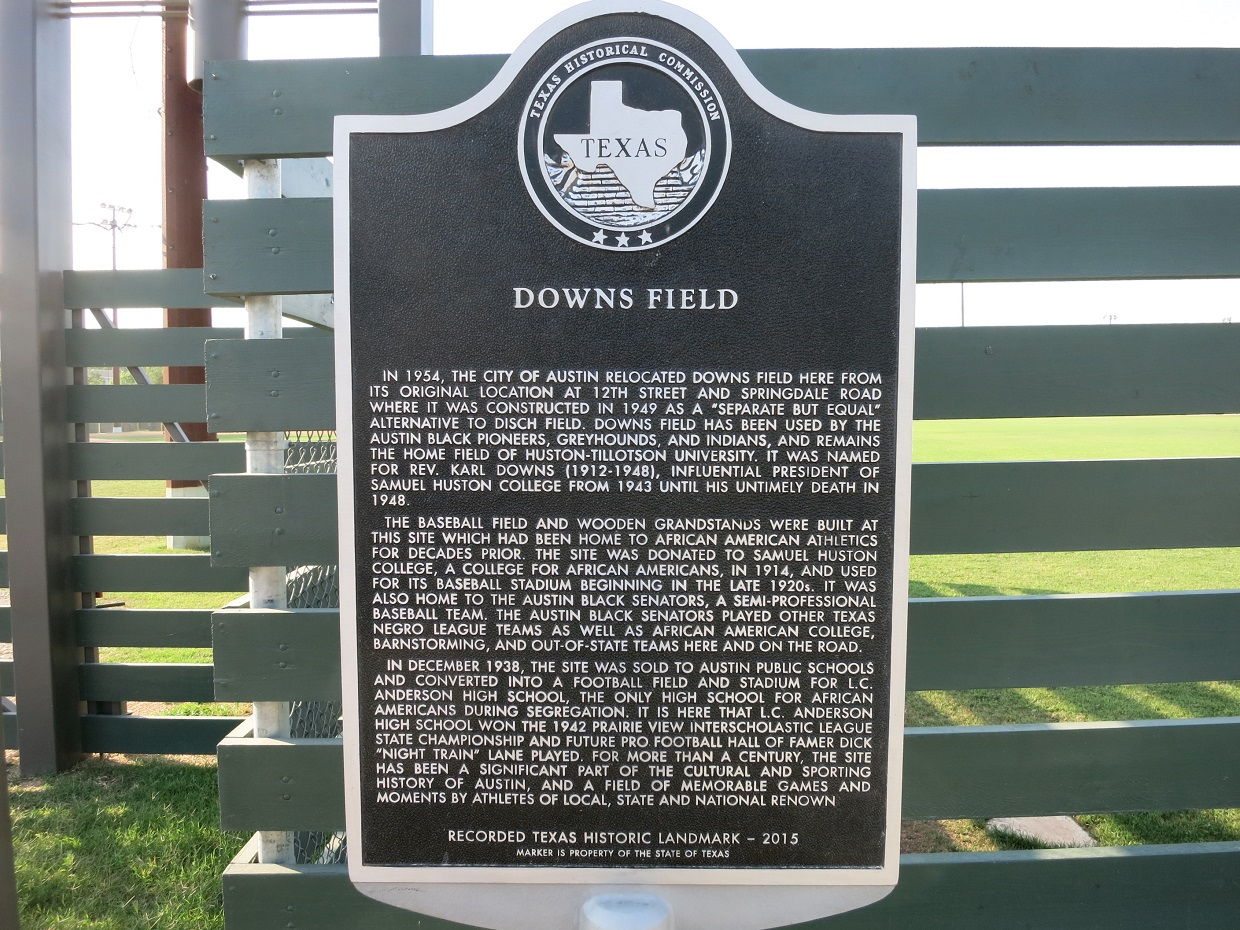
State historical marker at Downs Field

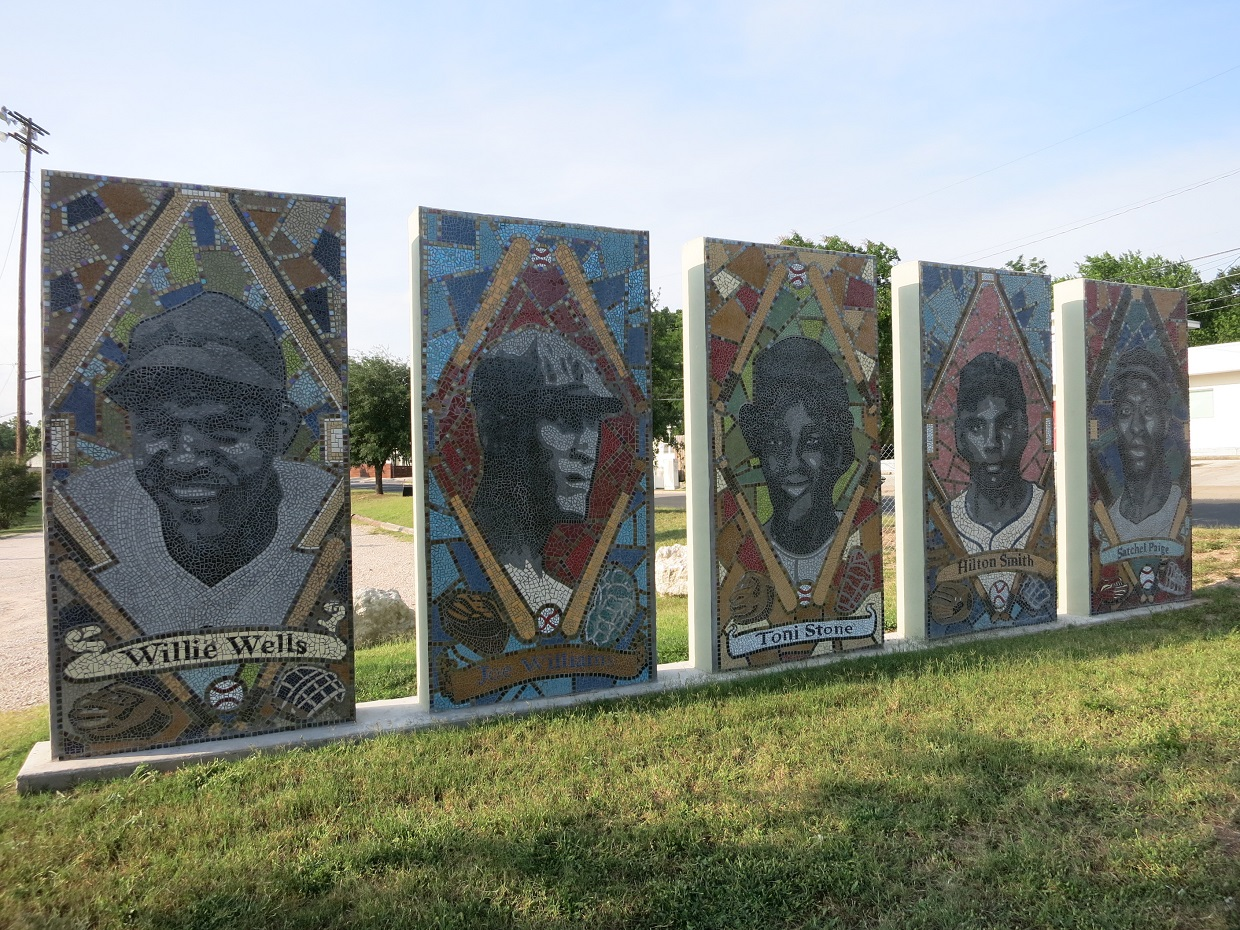
Mosaics depicting Willie Wells, Smokey Joe Williams, Toni Stone, Hilton Smith, and Satchel Paige
