= Robert Benjamin Hayes =

American college president, educator (1876–?)

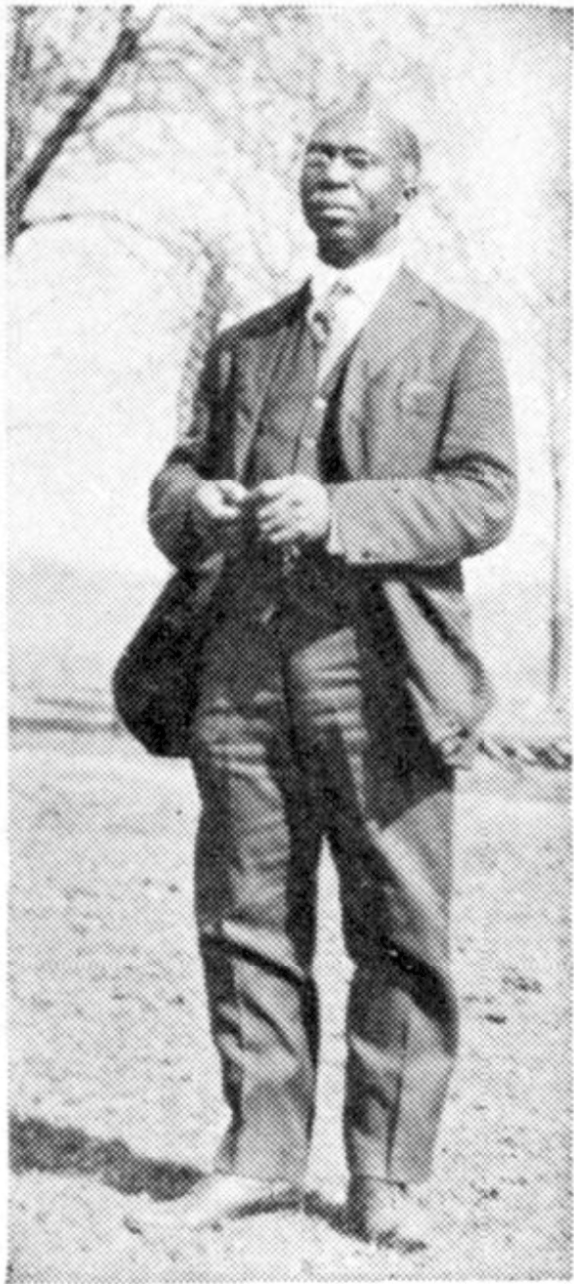

8th President of George R. Smith College
- In office 1916–1925
- Preceded by: Matthew Simpson Davage

Personal details
- Born: May 13, 1876 Navasota, Texas, U.S.
- Died: Unknown
- Spouse: Hattie P. Melton
- Children: 5
- Education: Baker University
- Occupation: Educator, academic administrator, college president

Robert Benjamin Hayes (May 13, 1876–?) was an American educator, academic administrator and college president. He headed Philander Smith College's natural science department, and served as the president of George R. Smith College from 1916 until 1925.

== Biography ==
Robert Benjamin Hayes was born on May 13, 1876, in Navasota, Texas, to African American parents Laura (née Clayton) and Lucius Hayes. He studied at public elementary and secondary schools in Chetopa, Kansas, and Guthrie, Oklahoma. He was the first Black child to attend high school in the Oklahoma Territory.

Hayes graduated with a bachelor of philosophy degree (1903), and master of arts degree (1903) from Baker University in Baldwin, Kansas.

He headed Philander Smith College's natural science department from 1903 until 1916. Hayes served as the president of George R. Smith College, from 1916 until 1925. Under his leadership, students from George R. Smith College participated in the State Constitutional Convention of Missouri. Starting in 1925 after George R. Smith College burned down, he served as the Dean of New Orleans University.

He married Hattie P. Melton in 1909, and together they had five children.
