= Victory Grill =

- U.S. National Register of Historic Places
- Recorded Texas Historic Landmark
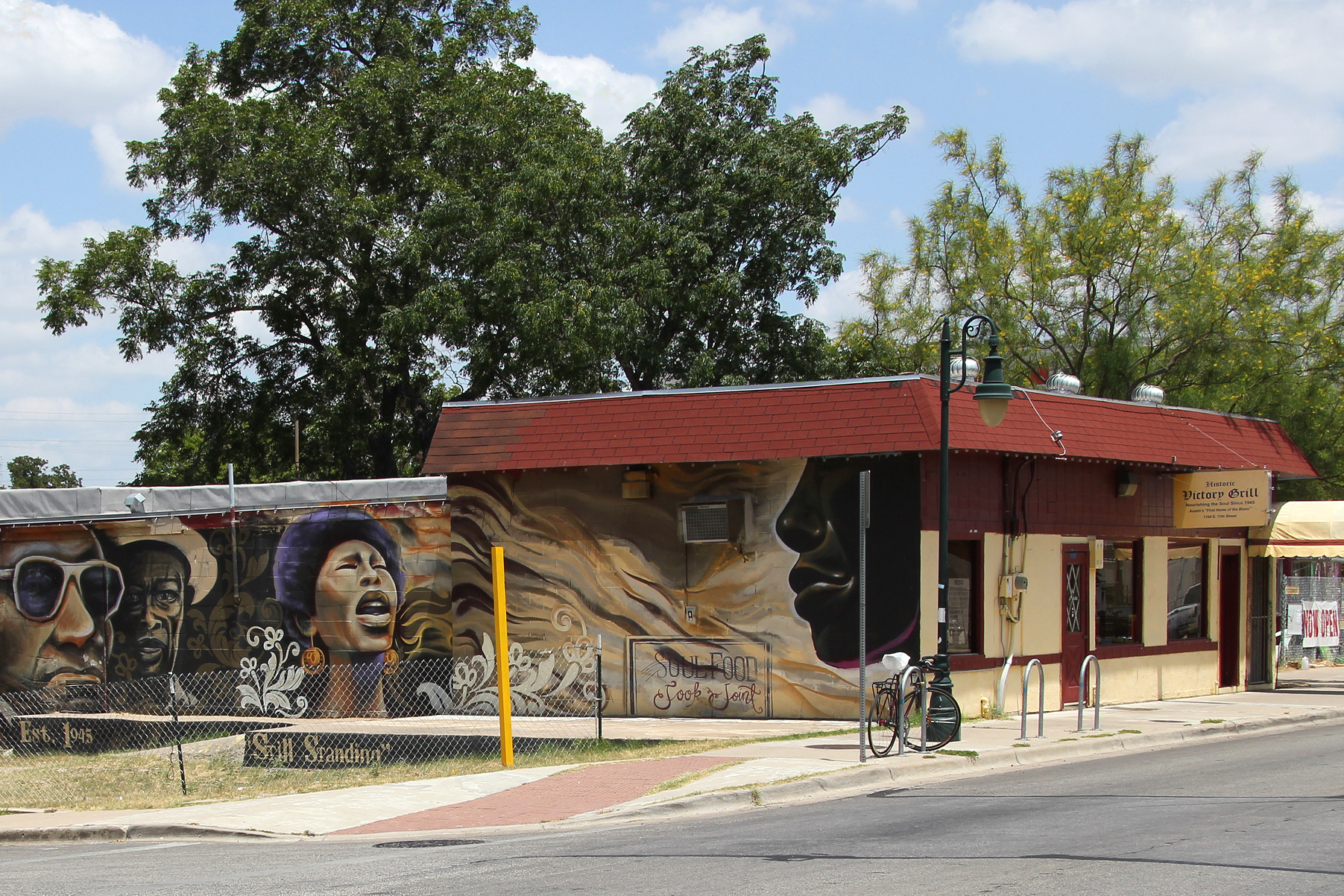
- The Victory Grill in 2011
- Location: 1104 E. 11th St; Austin, Texas, USA
- Coordinates: 30°16′09″N 97°43′43″W
- NRHP reference No.: 98001226
- RTHL No.: 15520

Significant dates
- Added to NRHP: October 16, 1998
- Designated RTHL: 2009

Victory Grill is a historic music venue located at 1104 E. 11th St, Austin, Texas. The nightclub was on the Chitlin' Circuit and hosted famous African American acts such as Bobby Bland, Clarence "Gatemouth" Brown, W. C. Clark and B. B. King when Austin was legally segregated. Victory Grill was added to the National Register of Historic Places on October 16, 1998.

== History ==
Johnny Holmes, a booking agent and band manager, opened the Victory Grill on Victory over Japan Day, 1945 as a restaurant and bar for black soldiers returning from the war. In the segregated south of the 1940s, these servicemen could not walk into just any place to have a beer. The first incarnation of the Victory was a small "lean-to" building, but Holmes soon moved to a larger building next door.

Holmes was also familiar with both the burgeoning Texas blues and jazz scenes, and soon, the club became known for its music as well as its food and drink. The club began attracting music lovers, no matter what their race. During its heyday in the 1950s, most of the popular national blues, rhythm and blues, and jazz acts that played Austin performed at the Victory Grill. Ike & Tina Turner, James Brown, Etta James, Billie Holiday, Chuck Berry and Janis Joplin were some of the artists who graced the stage. A resident of the area later quoted, "The street was so crowded you could barely walk. It was like New Orleans."

Holmes leased the Victory Grill out in 1952, while he traveled to West Texas and then Alaska. When he returned in 1965, he was shocked at how much the area had declined. Integration had allowed affluent blacks to move to the suburbs. Also with desegregation, the Chitlin' Circuit ceased to exist, as acts that were once confined to the Victory could now play many other venues. These two factors led to declining attendance and forced Holmes to close the nightclub portion of the Victory in the mid-1970s. Holmes kept the restaurant portion open, as the Victory's food was still special enough to be a big draw.

On Juneteenth weekend of 1987, East 11th came alive with music again at a large reunion bash which brought many of the Victory's former musicians and fans together again. The Victory Grill closed for a period of time after October 10, 1988, when it suffered major damage from a fire that spread from an adjoining vacant building.

Many movements and fundraisers were held in the following years to get the Victory Grill back open, but most met with tepid response at best. Finally, in 1995, R.V. Adams, a friend of Holmes began restoration efforts and the club re-opened in 1996. This initiated a cultural rebirth of the area, which had become a casualty of urban blight.

The Victory Grill is one of the last remaining original Chitlin' Circuit juke joints. It is listed on the National Register of Historic Places, archived by the Texas Historical Commission, and dubbed a "Texas Treasure" by the statewide organization Preservation Texas. It stands as an artifact to the development of a distinct American music tradition. The restoration of the Victory Grill bridged the era of the Chitlin' Circuit to today's urban contemporary sounds. The café serves southern cuisine, provides blues, jazz and urban contemporary entertainment, and provides educational opportunities that link past African-American musical forms and culture with the present. The venue is open for private events, educational opportunities and cultural tourism.
