= Huston–Tillotson University =

Historically black university in Austin, Texas, US

Huston-Tillotson University
- Former names: Tillotson Collegiate and Normal Institute (1875–1952); Samuel Huston College (1876–1952); Huston–Tillotson College (1952–2005)
- Type: Private historically black university
- Established: 1875; 151 years ago
- Affiliations: UNCF
- Religious affiliation: United Methodist Church, United Church of Christ
- Endowment: US$11.5 million
- President: Melva K. Wallace
- Provost: Archibald W. Vanderpuye
- Students: 1,160
- Undergraduates: 968
- Postgraduates: 55
- Location: Austin, Texas, U.S. 30.2648°N 97.7224°W
- Campus: 24 acres (9.7 ha)
- Colors: Maroon & gold
- Nickname: Rams
- Sporting affiliations: NAIA – RRAC
- Website: htu.edu
- Huston-Tillotson College
- U.S. National Register of Historic Places
- U.S. Historic district
- NRHP reference No.: 100007662
- Added to NRHP: April 22, 2022

Huston–Tillotson University (HT) is a private historically Black university in Austin, Texas, United States. Established in 1875, it was the first institution of higher learning in Austin. The university is affiliated with the United Methodist Church, the United Church of Christ, and the United Negro College Fund. Huston–Tillotson University awards bachelor's degrees in business, education, the humanities, natural sciences, social sciences, science, and technology and a master's degree in educational leadership. It also offers alternative teacher certification and academic programs for undergraduates interested in pursuing post-graduate degrees in law and medicine.

== History ==
Huston–Tillotson University began with the 1952 merger of two earlier schools: "Tillotson College" and "Samuel Huston College".

"Tillotson Collegiate and Normal Institute" was chartered as a coeducational school in 1877 by the American Missionary Society of Congregational churches and its namesake, George Jeffrey Tillotson. It opened on January 17, 1881, and had 12 presidents: William E. Brooks, first president (1881-85), John Hershaw (1886), Henry L. Hubbell (1886-1889), William M. Brown (1889-93), Winfield S. Goss (1894-95), Marshall R. Gaines (1896-1904), Arthur W. Partch (1905-06), Isaac M. Agard (1907-18), and Francis W. Fletcher (1919-23). J. T. Hodges, the first African American to be president (1924-29), was followed by Mary E. Branch (1930-44) and William H. Jones (1944)." Tillotson College was a women's college from 1926 to 1935.

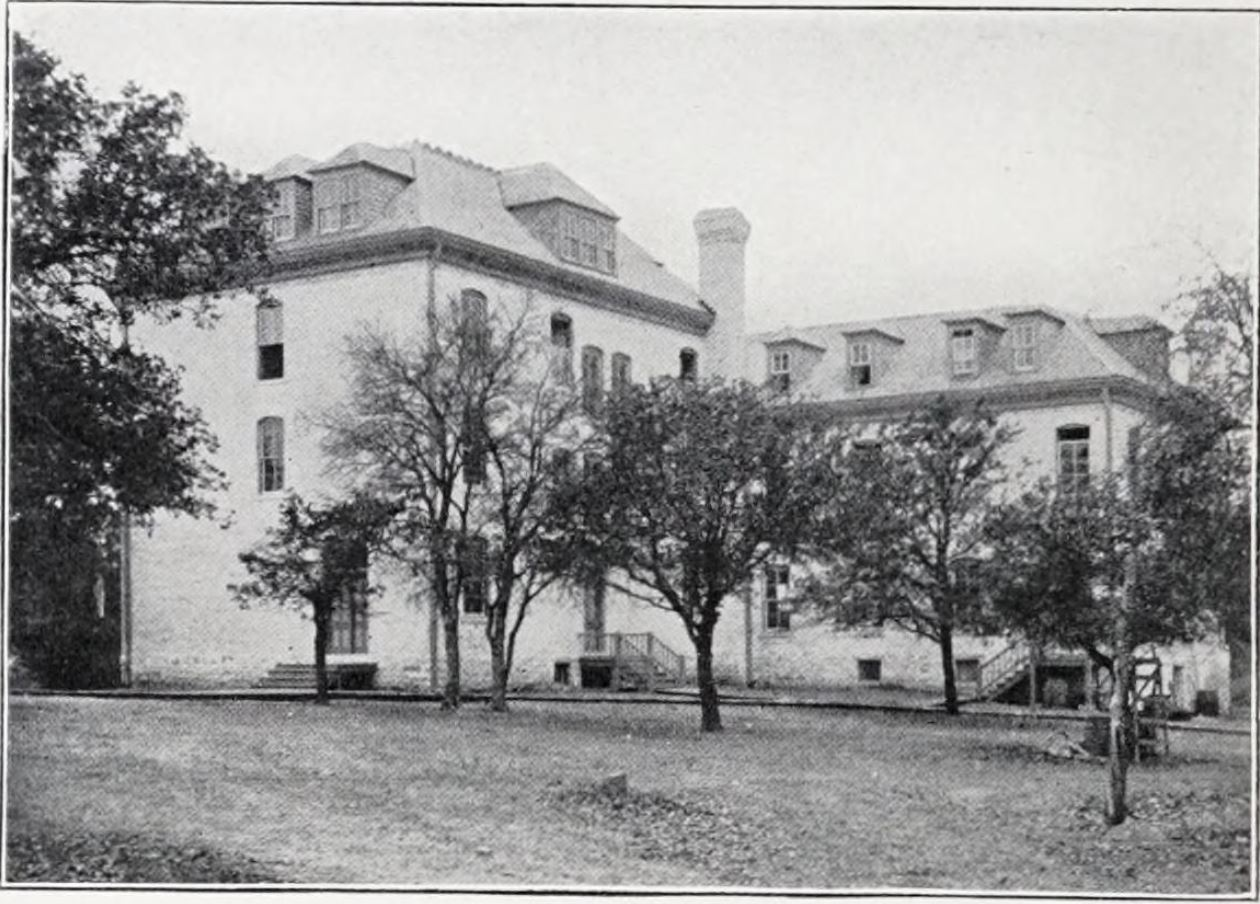
Girls Dormitories in 1910

"Samuel Huston College" developed out of an 1876 Methodist Episcopal conference. An 1883 agreement with the Freedmen's Aid Society led to the development of the college. The college was named after Samuel Huston of Marengo, Iowa, and the college opened in 1900.

On October 24, 1952, Tillotson College and Samuel Huston College merged to form "Huston–Tillotson College". It then became "Huston–Tillotson University" on February 28, 2005.

Before the merger, future baseball legend Jackie Robinson accepted an offer from his old friend and pastor Rev. Karl Downs who was president of the college, to be the athletic director at Samuel Huston College, then of the Southwestern Athletic Conference (SWAC).

Before joining the Kansas City Monarchs, Robinson coached the school's basketball team for the 1944–45 season. As a fledgling program, few students tried out for the basketball team, and Robinson even resorted to inserting himself into the lineup for exhibition games. Although his teams were outmatched by opponents, Robinson was respected as a disciplinarian coach, and drew the admiration of, among others, Langston University basketball player Marques Haynes, a future member of the Harlem Globetrotters.

In September 2025, Huston–Tillotson University received a $150 million donation from Ross Moody. This single donation is the largest in Huston–Tillotson's history and one of the largest ever to a HBCU.

History at a glance
1875	Tillotson Collegiate and Normal Institute opens
1876	Huston College opens
1935	Tillotson is a women's college.
1952	Huston–Tillotson College is established when the two colleges merge.
2005	The school becomes Huston–Tillotson University.

== Presidents ==
Since 2022, Melva K. Wallace serves as president of Huston–Tillotson University. She was preceded by Archibald W. Vanderpuye, an interim president.

== Academics ==
HTU offers undergraduate and graduate degrees through the following:

- College of Arts and Sciences
- School of Business and Technology

The W.E.B. Dubois Honors Program is a selective program that provides highly qualified undergraduate students special academic and extracurricular opportunities.

HTU has an engineering dual degree program with Prairie View A&M University. Under this program, HTU undergraduates complete preliminary required courses on campus and then automatically transfer to Prairie View A&M to complete their engineering degree. Students who successfully complete the program will receive two degrees: a Bachelor of Science in mathematics from HTU and a Bachelor of Science in an engineering discipline from Prairie View A&M.

== Campus ==
Huston–Tillotson University's campus is located at the site of the former Tillotson College on a land feature formerly known to local residents as Bluebonnet Hill. The 24-acre (9.7 ha) campus is located in East Austin, between seventh and 11th streets near I-35 and downtown Austin. East Austin has historically been the city's designated place for African-American culture and empowerment largely due to Jim Crow segregation laws.

Most of the buildings on campus follow the same nomenclature as the name of the university, with hyphens denoting the importance of the contributions of individuals from both colleges before the merger.

=== Anthony and Louise Viaer Alumni Hall ===
The Anthony and Louise Viaer Alumni Hall (formerly known as the Old Administration Building) is listed on the National Register of Historic Places.

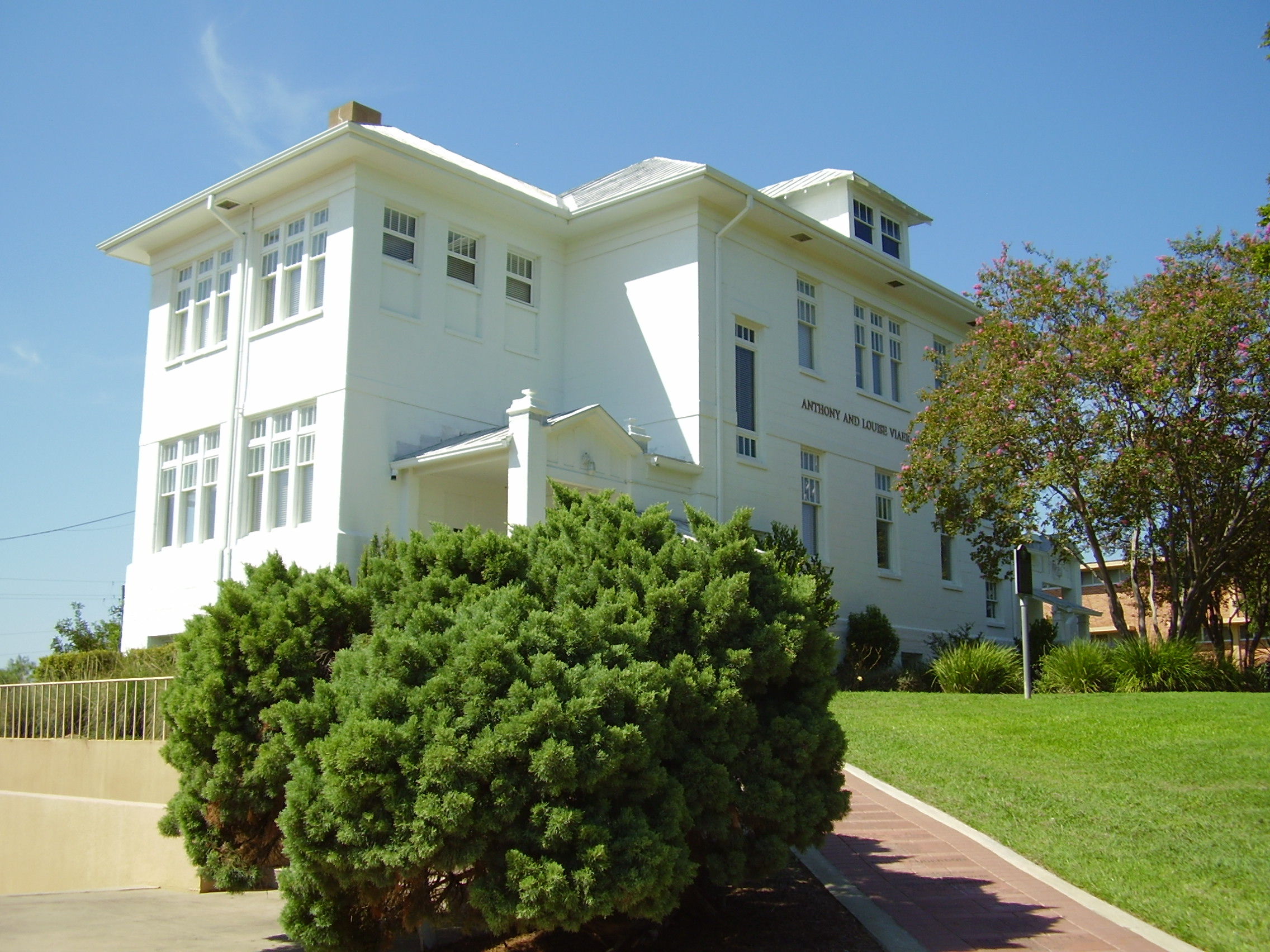
Anthony and Louise Viaer Alumni Hall

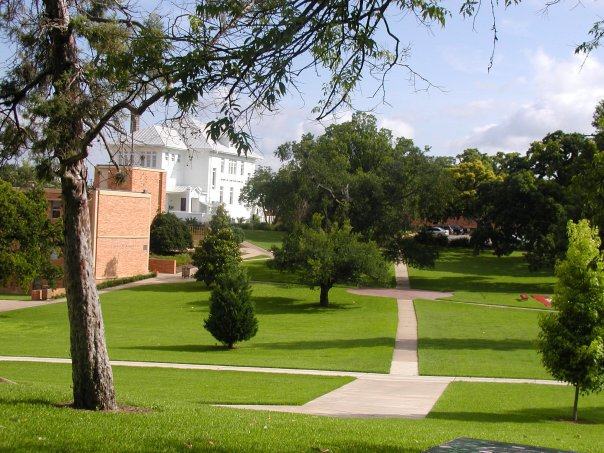
University campus

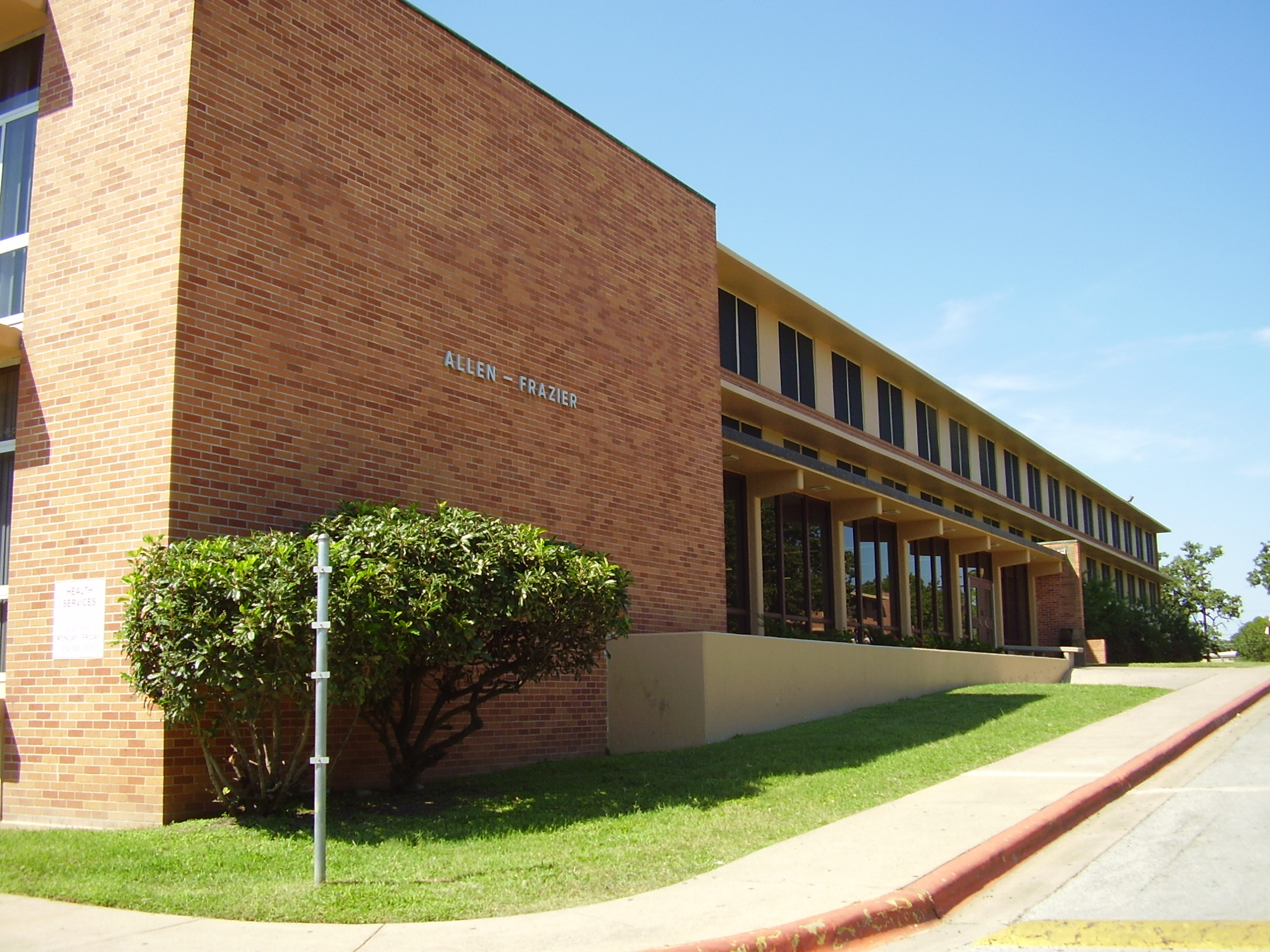
Allen Frazier Residence Hall

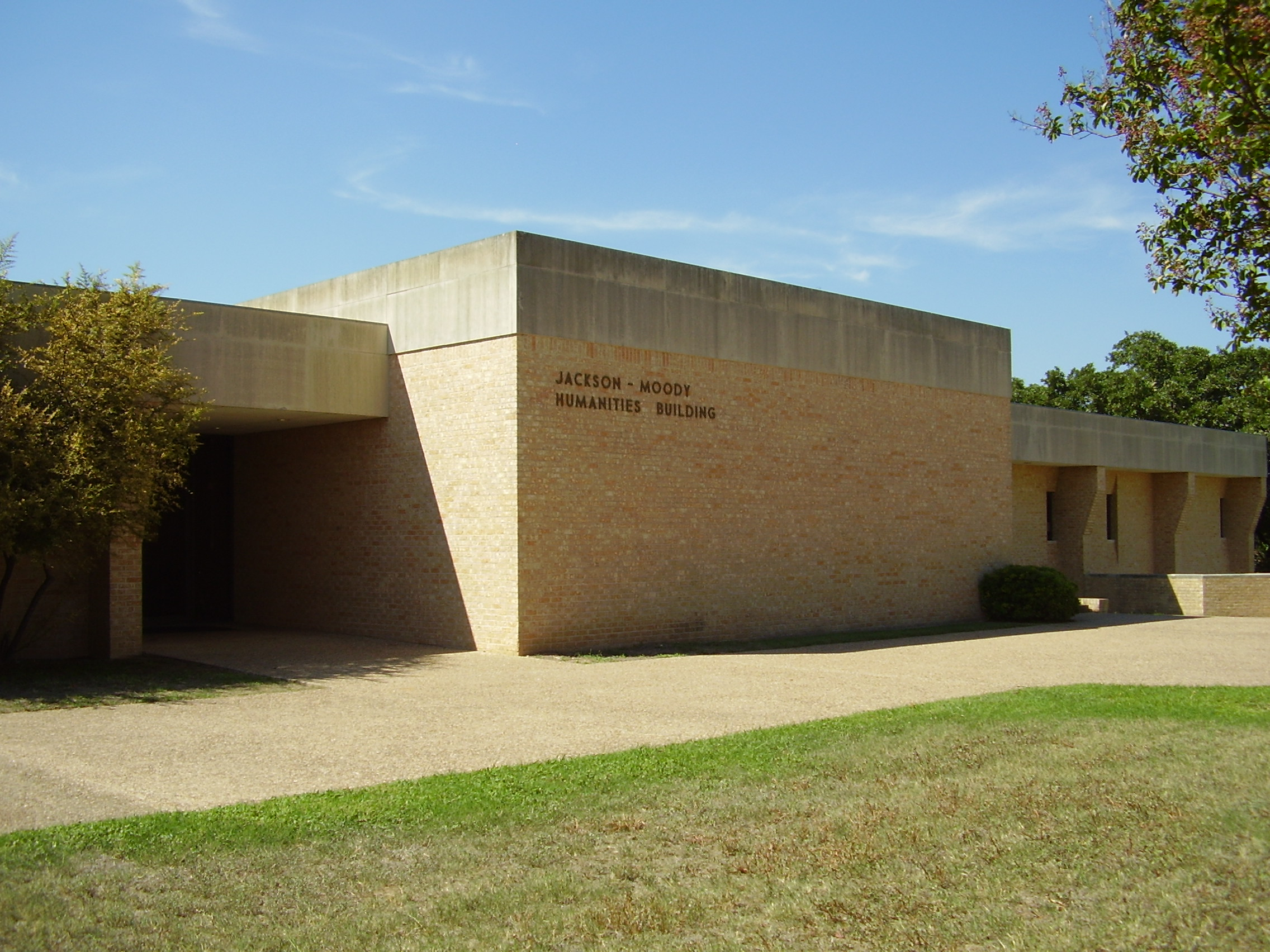
Jackson Moody Humanities Building

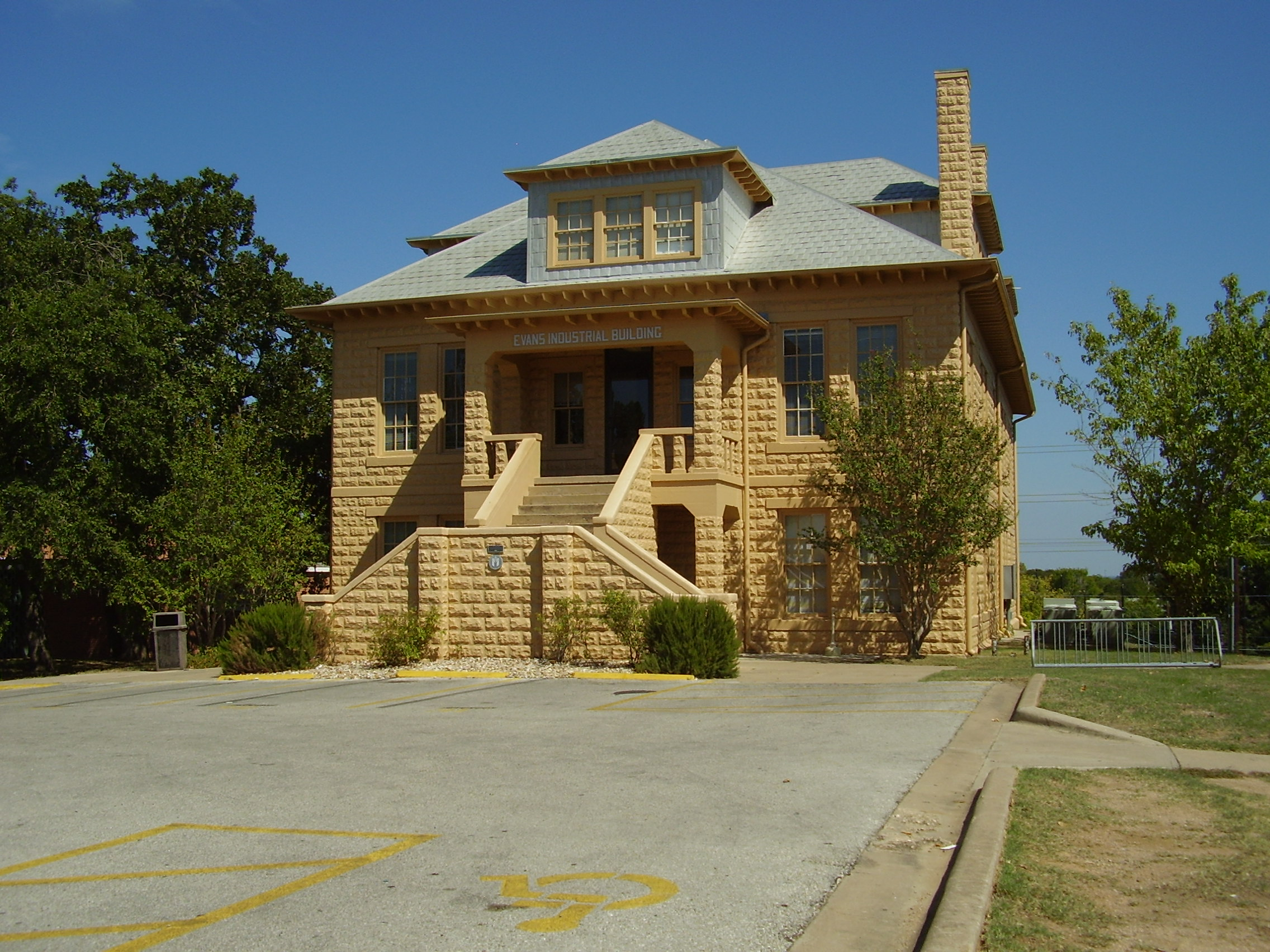
Evans Industrial Building

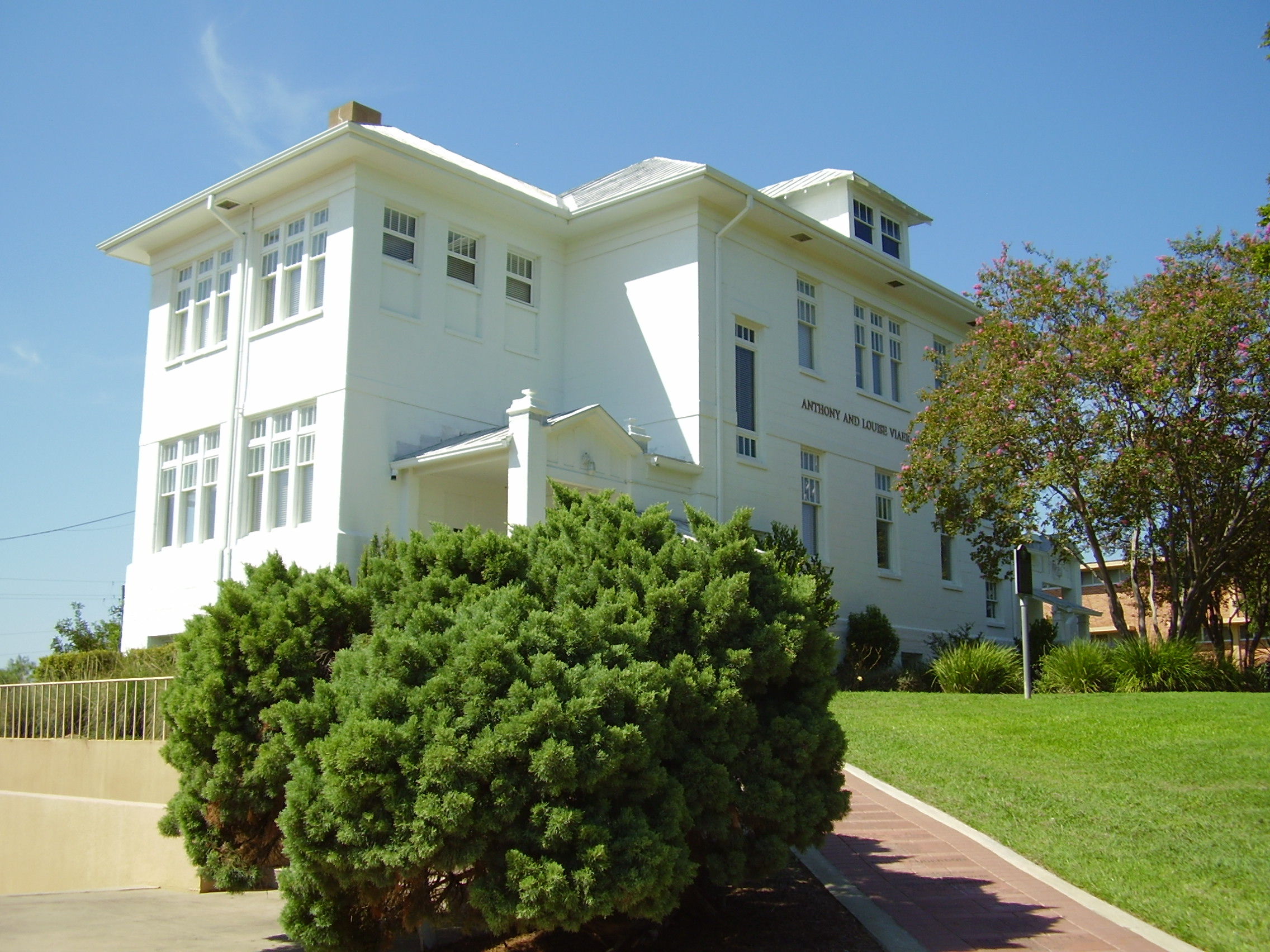
Alumni Hall

== Student body ==
In the fall of 2015, the student body was 57% female and 43% male. 68% identified as Black, 22% identified as Hispanic, 6% identified as non-Hispanic White, and the remaining 4% identified with other ethnicity or racial groups.

== Athletics ==
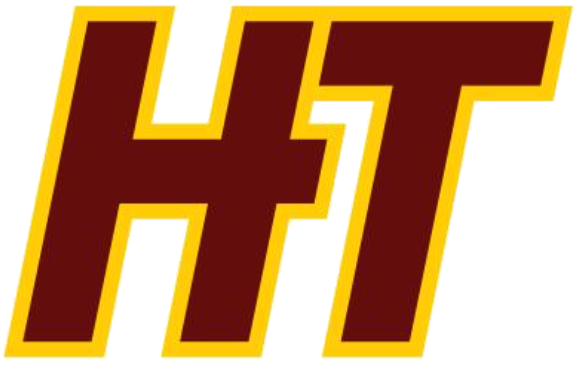
Huston–Tillotson athletics monogram

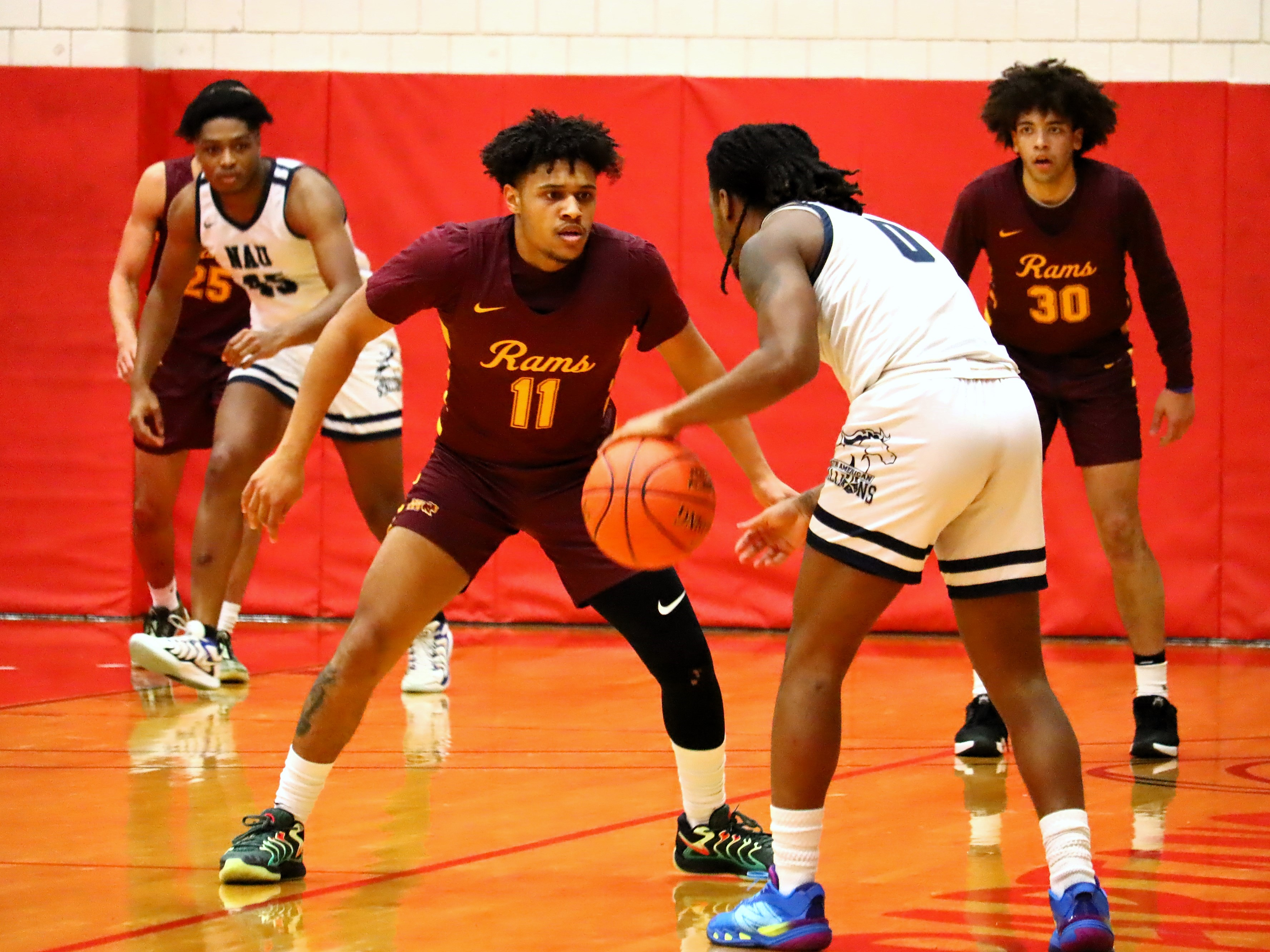
A Rams men's basketball game against North American University in 2025

The Huston–Tillotson athletic teams are called the Rams. The university is a member of the National Association of Intercollegiate Athletics (NAIA), primarily competing in the Red River Athletic Conference (RRAC) since the 1998–99 academic year. The Rams previously competed as a founding member of the Southwestern Athletic Conference (SWAC) from 1920 to 1921 to 1953–54 (when it was majority known as Samuel Huston College), which is currently an NCAA Division I FCS athletic conference.

Huston–Tillotson competes in 12 intercollegiate varsity sports: Men's sports include baseball, basketball, cross country, soccer and track & field; women's sports include basketball, soccer, softball, track & field and volleyball; and co-ed sports include cheerleading and eSports.

=== Facilities ===
The baseball team plays at historic Downs Field at East 12th Street and Alexander Avenue.

== Notable people ==
=== Faculty ===
- Mary Elizabeth Branch (1881-1944), president
- James Polk (musician), jazz pianist, organist, bandleader, and educator

=== Alumni ===
- Dr. Herman A. Barnett III, first African-American to be admitted to the University of Texas Medical School; first native Texan African-American to graduate from a Texas medical school and to be licensed to practice medicine in Texas; a successful doctor
- Maceo T. Bowie, first president of the Kennedy-King City College in Chicago
- Bobby Bradford, jazz trumpeter, cornetist, bandleader, and composer
- Dr June H. Brewer, former professor of English at Huston–Tillotson University for 35 years; former chairperson for the English Department at Hutson-Tillotson; one of the first five African Americans admitted to the University of Texas after the landmark Sweatt v. Painter case
- Juanita Craft, politician and civil rights activist
- Dr. Karl E. Downs, minister in the United Methodist Church, graduated from Sam Huston College (now Huston–Tillotson University), in 1933; the school's former president
- Maud A. B. Fuller, Baptist leader and educator
- Ron Givens, first African-American Republican member of the Texas House of Representatives, since 1982; represented Lubbock County 1985–1989; Realtor in Lubbock
- James A. Harris, scientist, part of a team that discovered and identified elements 104 and 105 in 1969-1970 which are now part of the periodic table of chemical elements
- Robert E. Hayes, bishop of the United Methodist Church; regional minister of congregations and ministries in Texas and Oklahoma
- Dr. Zan Wesley Holmes, retired pastor of the St. Luke 'Community' United Methodist Church in Dallas, Texas
- Joe Leonard Jr., Assistant Secretary for Civil Rights, United States Department of Agriculture; former executive director of the Congressional Black Caucus
- Azie Taylor Morton, Treasurer of the United States during the Carter administration
- Ahmed Johnson (born Anthony "Tony" Norris), professional wrestler
- Volma Overton, activist in the Civil Rights Movement
- James Polk (musician), jazz pianist, organist, bandleader, and educator
- Ada Simond, public health activist and historian
- Robert G. Stanton, former National Director of the U.S. Park Service during the Clinton administration
- Cecil Williams, former minister of Glide Memorial United Methodist Church in San Francisco, community leader, author, lecturer, and spokesperson for the poor
- Joyce Yerwood, physician and social justice advocate; first female African American physician in Fairfield County, Connecticut
