= Newton Theological Seminary =

Newton Theological Seminary or Newton Theological School may refer to:

- Newton Theological Institution (1825–1965)
- Andover Newton Theological School (1965–2017)
- Andover Newton Seminary at Yale Divinity School (2017—)
- Newton Theological Institution Historic District
