= Institute of Sacred Music =

Institute of Sacred Music may refer to:

- The Pontifical Institute of Sacred Music in Rome;
- Yale Institute of Sacred Music, at the Union Theological Seminary in New York.
