= Andover Newton Theological School =

Religious school

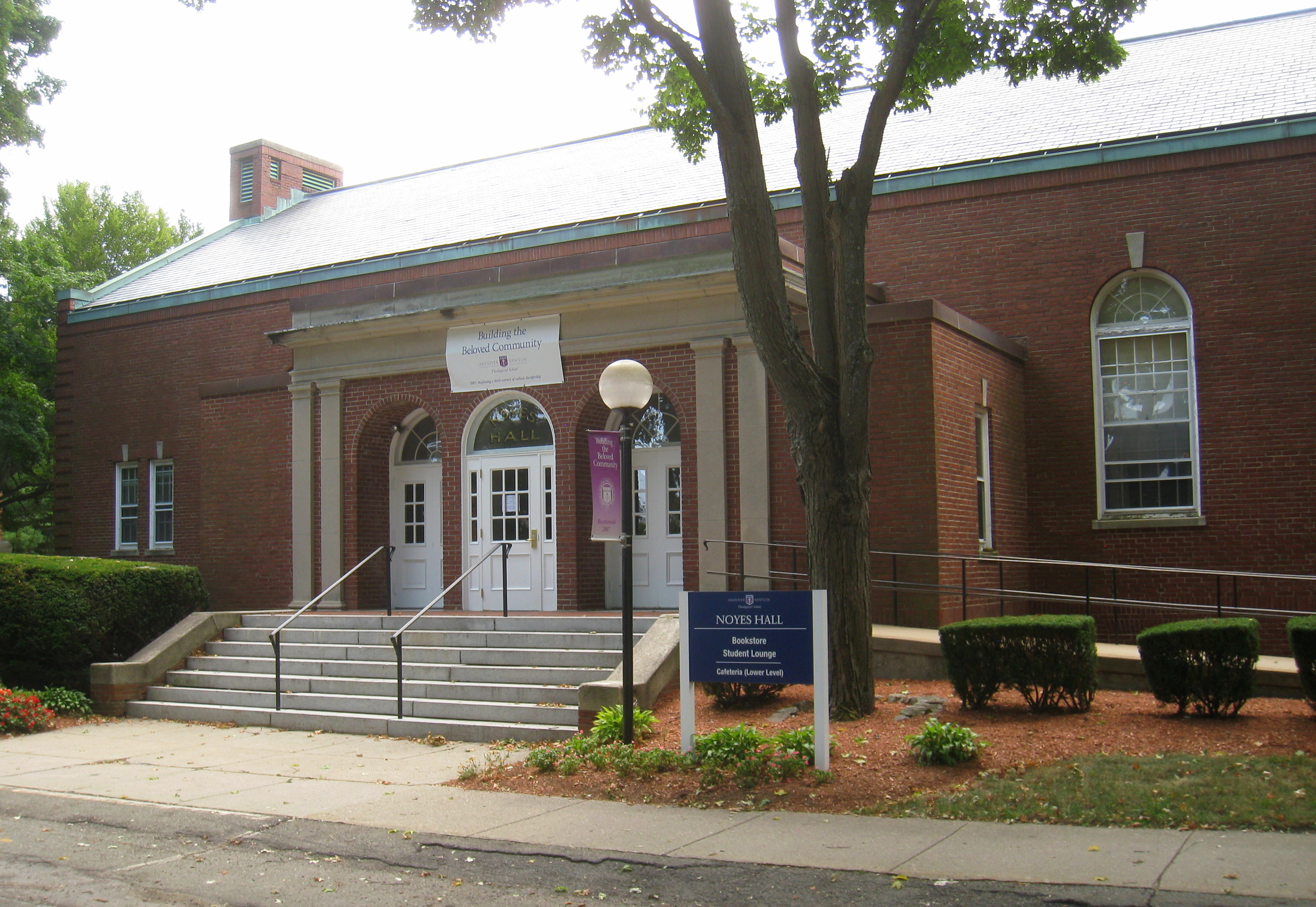
- Noyes Hall at the Andover Newton Theological School
- Former names: Andover Theological Seminary (1807–1965), Newton Theological Institution (1825–1965), Andover Newton Theological School (1965–2018)
- Type: Private
- Established: 1825
- Affiliations: NEASC
- Religious affiliation: United Church of Christ, American Baptist Churches USA
- Location: Newton, Massachusetts, United States
- Campus: Suburban
- Website: andovernewton.yale.edu

Andover Newton Theological School is the predecessor of Andover Newton Seminary at Yale Divinity School and a graduate school and seminary, affiliated with the American Baptist Churches USA and the United Church of Christ. It was located in Newton, Massachusetts and was the product of a merger between Andover Theological Seminary and Newton Theological Institution. In recent years, it was an official open and affirming seminary, meaning that it was open to students of same-sex attraction or transgender orientation and generally advocated for tolerance of it in church and society.

Seal of Andover Newton Theological School

In November 2015, the school announced that it would move from its campus and become part of Yale University in New Haven, Connecticut, a process it completed in July 2017.

== History ==
Andover Newton was a product of a 1965 merger between two schools of theology: Andover Theological Seminary and Newton Theological Institution. The two institutions had been co-resident on the same campus in Newton Centre, Massachusetts, since 1931. Andover Newton took the earlier founding date (1807) of the Andover Theological Seminary for its founding year.

The school created the educational model used by almost all Protestant seminaries today and pioneered many training programs for prospective clergy, including field education. Its alumni and alumnae included important abolitionists, educators, clergy, and theologians; three presidents of Brown University; the founding presidents of Wabash College, Grinnell College, and the Union Theological Seminary in New York City; and one of the most important presidents of Dartmouth College.

=== Andover ===
Andover Theological Seminary was founded in 1807 by orthodox Calvinists who were members of Congregational churches (forebears of the United Church of Christ) who fled Harvard College after it appointed Unitarian theologian Henry Ware to the Hollis Professorship of Divinity in 1805. One of the founders of the school, and of the Massachusetts Missionary Society, was Rev. Samuel Spring. Widely reported in the national press, the founding by the Calvinists was one of the significant events that contributed to the split in the New England Congregationalist tradition, and to the eventual founding of the American Unitarian Association in 1825.

The new school built a suite of Federal-style buildings at Phillips Academy in Andover, Massachusetts, which the school occupied for its first century. (Most of the original seminary campus survives today as part of the historic core of the Phillips Academy campus.)

Before Andover was founded, American Protestant clergymen attended undergraduate college, then learned their profession by studying under a minister. The new seminary was the first to formalize graduate study for clergymen with a resident student body and resident faculty. The program was for three years of study in four subjects: the Bible, church history, doctrinal theology and the practical arts of ministry.

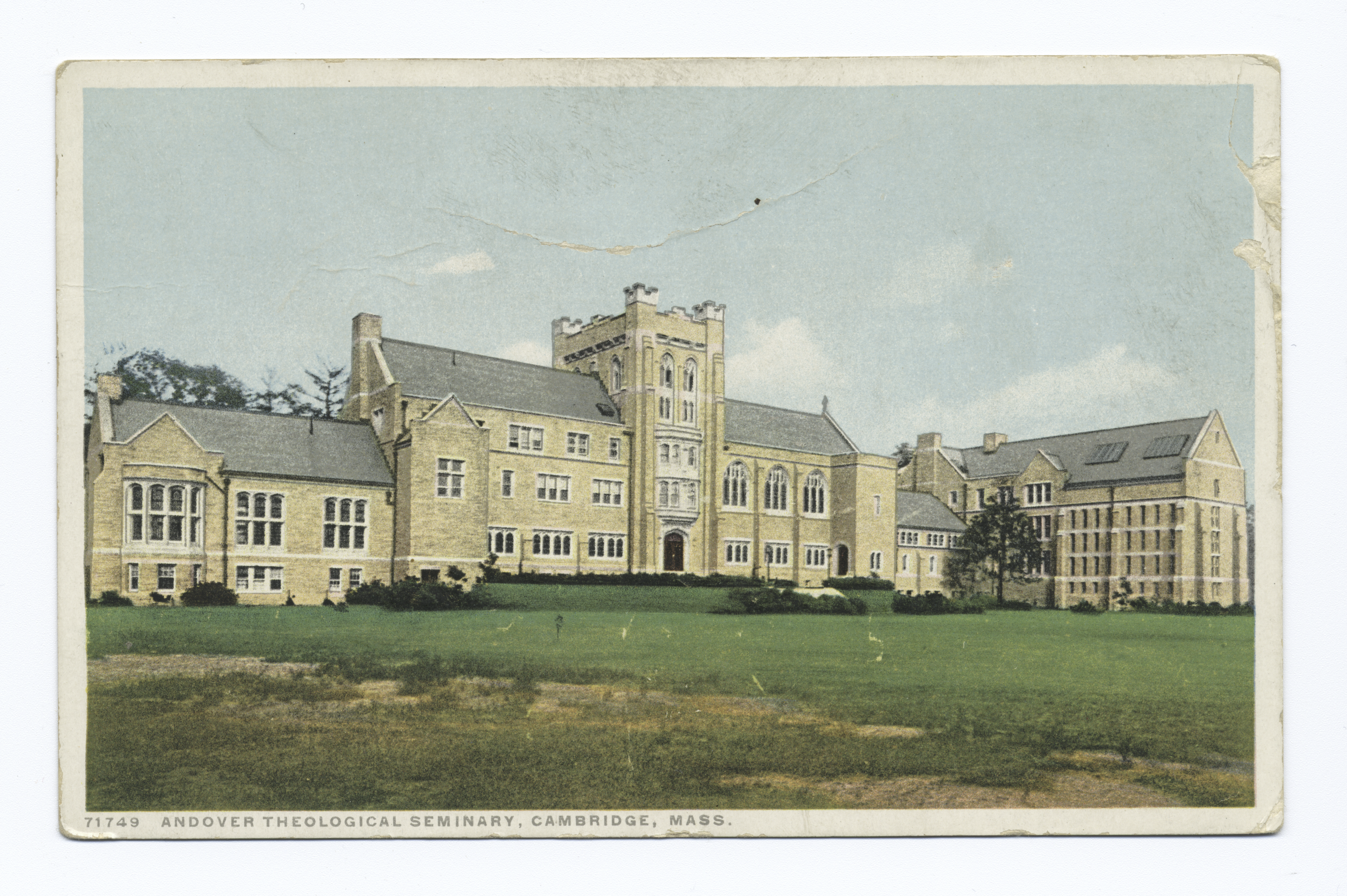
Andover Theological Seminary, Cambridge, Massachusetts

In 1908, Harvard Divinity School and Andover attempted to reconcile (both institutions were strongly theologically liberal by this point), and for a period of 18 years shared Harvard's Cambridge campus. The seminary moved its faculty and library to Cambridge, built a large academic-Gothic style facility there, and began to develop plans for a more formal merger with Harvard. However, the Supreme Judicial Court of Massachusetts disallowed the alliance. Although the court decision was later reversed, Andover eventually relocated to the Newton Centre campus of the Newton Theological Institution in 1931.

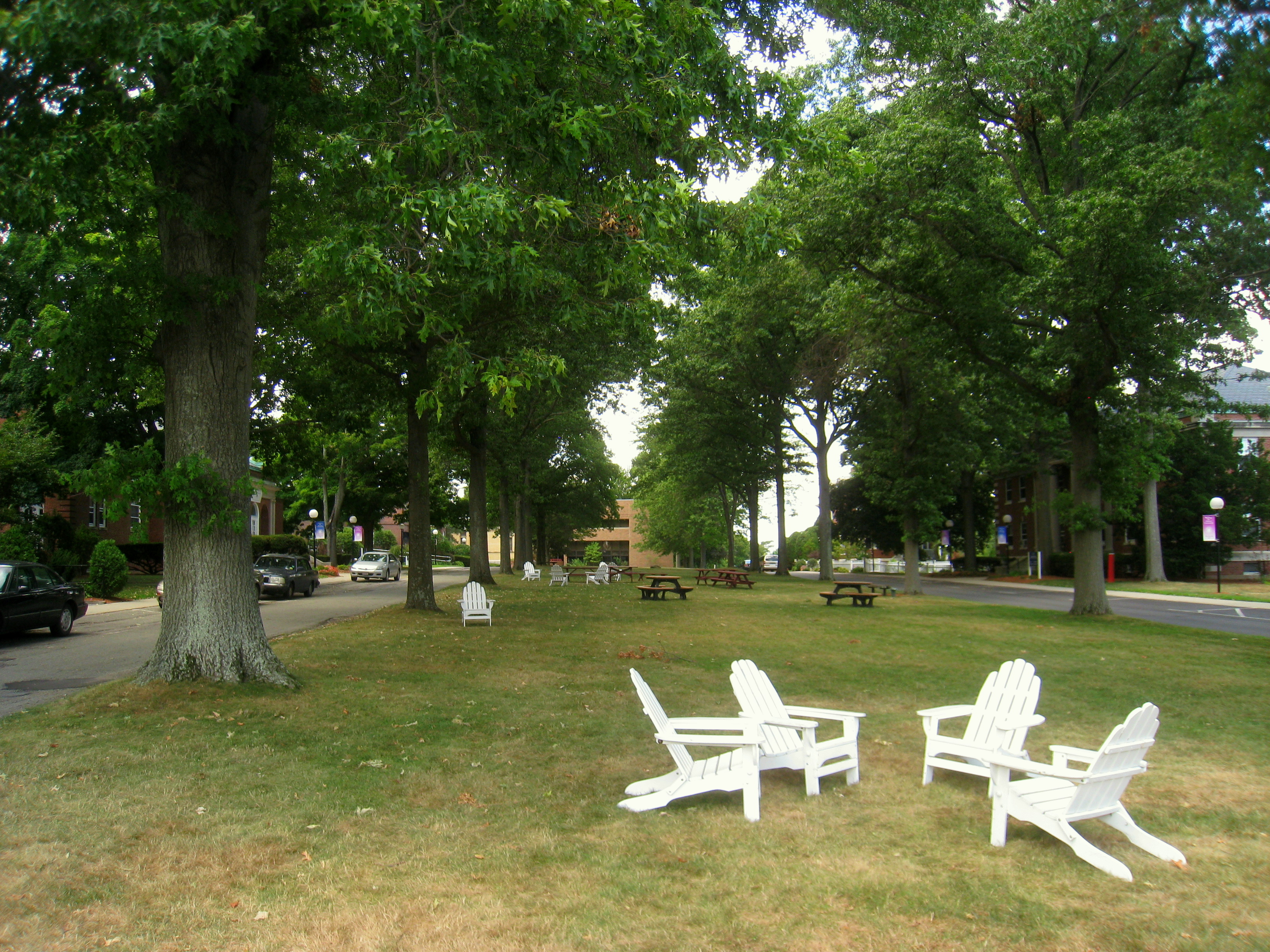
Campus view

The original Andover Seminary library remained on the Harvard campus, where, merged with the library collections of the Harvard Divinity School, it became known as Andover-Harvard Theological Library. Andover Newton retained ownership of the books.

Harvard later purchased the school's Cambridge real estate, which, known as Andover Hall, now houses most of the Harvard Divinity School. Although the planned merger with Harvard was never completed, the two schools remained loosely affiliated. Andover Newton students and faculty had access to the Harvard College Library system and Andover Newton students were able to register for classes at any of the university's schools.

=== Newton ===
Newton Theological Institution began instruction in 1825 on an 80-acre (32.4 ha) former estate at Newton Centre in Newton, Massachusetts, as a graduate seminary formally affiliated with the Triennial Convention, now known as the American Baptist Churches USA. Its founders were Joseph Grafton, Lucius Bolles, Daniel Sharp, Jonathan Going, Bela Jacobs, Ebenezer Nelson, Francis Wayland, Henry Jackson, Ensign Lincoln, Jonathan Bacheller, and Nathaniel R. Cobb.

An important early benefactor and long-time treasurer of Newton Theological Institution was Gardner Colby, Boston industrialist and resident of Newton Centre near the campus. Colby Hall (designed by architect Alexander Rice Esty) and Colby Chapel on the Andover Newton campus were named in his honor. Colby also contributed to a number of other New England Baptist institutions, including Brown University and Colby College in Waterville, Maine, which was also named in his honor.

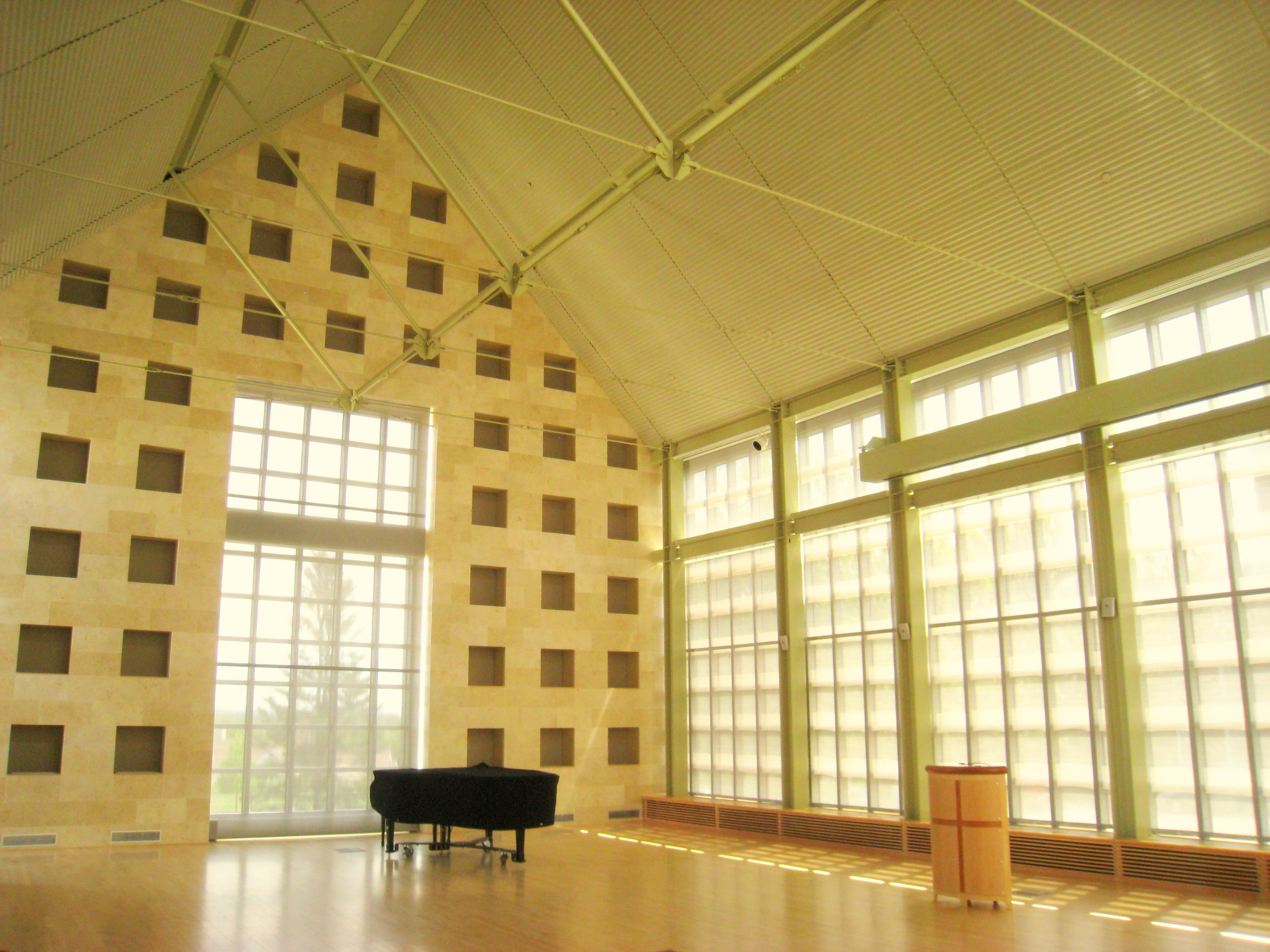
Wilson Chapel interior

From 1931 on, the facilities of the Newton Centre campus expanded many times, especially during a boom in enrollment during the 1950s and '60s. The last addition was Wilson Chapel, a modern interpretation of the traditional New England meetinghouse, constructed to mark the school's bicentennial in 2007.

=== Andover Newton ===
Andover and Newton formally merged in 1965, creating Andover Newton Theological School. Another important 21st-century construction on "the Hill" in Newton Centre was the contemporary campus of Hebrew College, designed by the architect Moshe Safdie. The two schools collaborated on a number of interfaith programs and their students were able to cross-register for classes.

In 2010, Andover Newton and Meadville Lombard Theological School, a Chicago-based seminary affiliated with the Unitarian Universalist Association, announced plans to create a "new university-style institution" at the Newton Centre campus, with an interfaith model for theological education. Meadville was to sell its campus in Chicago and become the "Unitarian" division of the new institution, with Andover Newton becoming the "Christian" component. The two institutions withdrew from the plan in April 2011, citing issues related to governance and finances.

=== Andover Newton at Yale ===
In May 2016, ANTS president Martin Copenhaver announced that Andover Newton would begin a process of formal affiliation with Yale Divinity School over a two-year period. In the 2016–17 academic year, a cohort of faculty relocated to New Haven, Connecticut, teaching students and launching pilot initiatives focused on congregational ministry education, while Andover Newton continued to operate in Massachusetts. Copenhaver projected that a sale of the Newton campus would pay off debt and create an endowment for the institution at Yale.

On June 29, 2017, the Andover Newton campus was sold to Eversail LLC, a company affiliated with Gerald Chan. On July 20, the boards of Andover Newton and Yale Divinity School signed an agreement to formalize their affiliation beginning in the 2017–18 academic year. Under the agreement, Andover Newton Seminary at Yale Divinity School was established as a unit within Yale Divinity School, similar to Yale's arrangement with the Episcopal seminary Berkeley Divinity School. Andover Newton relinquished its accreditation from the New England Commission of Higher Education in 2019.

Andover Newton students at YDS earn a diploma from Andover Newton in addition to their Yale degrees, and receive scholarship support from the Andover Newton Seminary Program. Andover Newton also funds some faculty positions at YDS.

== Academics and student life ==
Andover Newton was first accredited by the New England Association of Schools and Colleges in 1978, and granted master's degrees as well as a doctor of ministry. Andover Newton students were also allowed to take classes in any of Harvard University's ten graduate schools due to the prior affiliation of Andover Theological Seminary and the Harvard Divinity School, which combined their libraries in 1911 to form the Andover-Harvard Theological Library on the Harvard campus. While there were 350 students enrolled in 2007, who represented 35 Christian denominations, a decade later, it had dropped to 225, mostly part-time students, down from 450 full-time enrollees a generation earlier. United Church of Christ students remained the largest segment of the student body, followed by Unitarian Universalists and Baptists.

=== Academic awards ===
The ‘Spirit of the Hill’ award, announced at the annual Fall Convocation, was conferred upon one alumnus/a who has exhibited exemplary skills in ministry. Additionally, the Seminary awarded several prizes to its students in recognition of outstanding achievements. A prize for Excellence in Writing was awarded annually by the faculty, named after American theologian and writer, Frederick Buechner.

== Notable persons ==
Andover Theological Seminary and Newton Theological Institution produced many notable graduates. Collectively, many of these graduates had a big influence on America.

Prior to the American Civil War, when there were few fully developed graduate programs in the United States, the two schools trained some of the nation's most important scholars, linguists, social activists, educational innovators, and college presidents as well as many of its leading Protestant clergy.

Below are the graduates of the school:

- Adoniram Judson, class of 1810, is one of the earliest notable alumni and among the first U.S. missionaries sent by the American Board of Commissioners for Foreign Missions. He later became a Baptist missionary to Myanmar, then known as Burma. He also founded the Boston Missionary Training Institute, later named Gordon College in his honor. Gordon College was named after Adoniram Judson Gordon, who is not the same person as Adoniram Judson.
- Thomas Hopkins Gallaudet, class of 1814, was the founder of education for the deaf in the United States, established the first American school for the deaf, and was the principal developer of what became American Sign Language. Gaulladet University in Washington, D.C., was renamed in his honor in 1893.
- Hiram Bingham and Asa Thurston, class of 1816, were the first missionaries to Hawaii, where they devised an alphabet for written Hawaiian.
- Francis Wayland entered Andover Theological Seminary in 1816 but was too poor to complete his studies there. He later helped found Newton Theological Institution. Like two later Newton alumni, Wayland was president of Brown University. He held the position for 28 years and is remembered as one of that school's most important early leaders.
- David Oliver Allen, class of 1824, was an American missionary.
- Nehemiah Adams, class of 1829, was a clergyman and author.
- Bela Bates Edwards, class of 1830, was editor of American Quarterly Observer, Biblical Repository, and Bibliotheca Sacra.
- William Adams, class of 1830, was one of the founders of the Union Theological Seminary in the City of New York and later its president.
- Caleb Mills, class of 1833, was the founding president and first faculty member of Wabash College and is considered the father of the Indiana public education system.
- Samuel Francis Smith, class of 1834, was the Baptist minister who wrote the words to America or My Country, 'Tis of Thee while still a student on the Andover campus (where his dormitory, still in use at Phillips Academy, is now known as "America House").
- George Frederick Magoun, class of 1847, was co-founder and the first president of Grinnell College
- George Park Fisher, class of 1851, was a church historian and president of the American Historical Association.
- Charles Augustus Aiken, class of 1853, was a noted professor of Latin at Dartmouth College, the sixth president of Union College, and later taught at Princeton Theological Seminary.
- George Trumbull Ladd, class of 1869, was an American philosopher, educator, and psychologist.
- George Washington Williams, class of 1874, was an American Civil War soldier, Baptist minister, politician, lawyer, journalist, and writer on African-American history. His open letter to King Leopold of Belgium spurred a public outcry against the brutal Belgian colonization of the Congo.
- William Scott Ament, class of 1877, was a controversial Congregational missionary to China criticized by Mark Twain.
- Claude Black, class of 1943, was pastor of Mt. Zion First Baptist Church, a civil rights icon, and politician.
- Rufus Tobey, class of 1880, founder of Tufts Childrens Hospital
- Joseph Twichell, class of 1865, writer and minister of Asylum Hill Congregational Church in Hartford, Connecticut
- Albert Edward Winship is known for his work as an educator.
- Joseph Hardy Neesima did not graduate, but was the founder and president of Doshisha University in Japan.
- Lucius Walker, a 1958 graduate, was a Baptist minister best known for his opposition to the United States embargo against Cuba.
- Arthur Luther Whitaker, a 1954 graduate, first African-American to be appointed as an executive minister within the American Baptist Churches USA.
- Major General William G. Everson, 1908, Chief of the National Guard Bureau

=== Notable faculty ===
- Harvey Cox, theologian, author of The Secular City, scholar of Christian social ethics, international peace activist, and vice president of the National Council of Churches
- Carole R. Fontaine, biblical scholar and artist
- George Foot Moore, distinguished theologian and church historian
- Calvin Ellis Stowe, class of 1828, is considered one of the creators of the American public school system. He published widely on issues of public education and established the College of Teachers in Cincinnati. A prominent abolitionist, he was married to Harriet Beecher Stowe, author of Uncle Tom's Cabin, and was an enthusiastic supporter of her literary career.
- William Jewett Tucker, class of 1866, was described at his death as "the great president" of Dartmouth College who transformed a small, rural, regional school into a major Ivy League university. The Tucker Foundation at Dartmouth was founded to carry on his legacy on campus.
- Amos Niven Wilder, poet, critic, New Testament scholar, and brother of the writer Thornton Wilder
