= Teresa Berger =

German scholar of liturgical studies and Catholic theology

- Born: 1956 (age 69–70); Germany
- Education: Westfälische Wilhelms-Universität
- Alma mater: Ruprecht-Karls-Universität

Teresa Berger (born 1956) is a German scholar of liturgical studies and Catholic theology. She is the Thomas E. Golden Jr. Professor in Catholic Theology as well as a professor of liturgical studies at Yale Divinity School and the Yale Institute of Sacred Music.

== Career ==
Berger was born in Germany in 1956. After studying in Mainz and Nottingham, she earned a doctorate in theology in 1984 at the Ruprecht-Karls-Universität, in Heidelberg. In 1989 she received an additional doctorate in liturgical studies from Westfälische Wilhelms-Universität in Munster, Germany, and in 1991 her habilitation.

After completing her studies in Heidelberg, Berger came to Duke Divinity School for a year of study. The following year, 1987, she joined the faculty at Duke Divinity School as associate professor of ecumenical theology.

Berger began teaching at Yale Divinity School in 2007. In April 2015, she was appointed the Thomas E. Golden Jr. Professor in Catholic Theology. This is the first endowed chair of Catholic Theology in Yale Divinity School's history, and Berger was the first faculty member appointed to the professorship. She is also a professor of Liturgical Studies, and teaches in Yale's Institute of Sacred Music.

In addition to teaching at Duke and Yale, she has also been a visiting professor at the Universities of Mainz, Münster, Berlin and Uppsala.

== Liturgical studies ==
Berger's writing is informed by gender and cultural studies and, most recently, the theory of digital media. She has written on feminist liturgy, gender and liturgical history, liturgy and creation, and the migration of liturgical practices to the digital social space.

Among other titles, Berger edited Dissident Daughters: Feminist Liturgies in Global Context, published in 2001, which examined "woman-identified" liturgies, and the women activists and communities that have created them. In 2007, Berger co-produced a video documentary about women's liturgies entitled Worship in Women's Hands.

== Bibliography ==
- Festschrift Worship in Communion with Creation: Recognizing a Broader Participation (Liturgical Press, 2026) ISBN 9780814689042
- Liturgie und Tanz: anthropologische Aspekte, historische Daten, theologische Perspektiven (St. Ottilien : EOS Verlag, 1985) ISBN 3880962618
- Liturgie und Frauenseele: die liturgische Bewegung aus der Sicht der Frauenforschung (Verlag W. Kohlhammer, 1993) ISBN 3170121979
- Theology in Hymns?: A Study of the Relationship of Doxology and Theology According to A Collection of Hymns for the Use (Kingswood Books, 1995) ISBN 9780687002818
- Sei gesegnet, meine Schwester: Frauen feiern Liturgie: geschichtliche Rückfragen, praktistche Impulse, theologische Vergewisserungen (Würzburg: Echter, 1999) ISBN 3429021359
- (editor) Dissident Daughters: Feminist Liturgies in Global Context (Westminster John Knox Press, 2001) ISBN 0664223796
- Fragments of Real Presence: Liturgical Traditions in the Hands of Women (Herder & Herder, 2005) ISBN 9780824522957
- (editor) The Spirit in Worship, Worship in the Spirit (Liturgical Press, 2009) ISBN 9780814662281
- Gender Differences and the Making of Liturgical History: Lifting a Veil on Liturgy's Past (Liturgy, Worship and Society Series) (Routledge, 2011) ISBN 9781409426998
- (editor) Liturgy in Migration: From the Upper Room to Cyberspace (Liturgical Press, 2012) ISBN 9780814662755
- (editor) Liturgy's imagined Past/s: Methodologies and Materials in the Writing of Liturgical History Today (Liturgical Press, 2016) ISBN 9780814662687
- @ Worship: Liturgical Practices in Digital Worlds (Liturgy, Worship and Society Series) (Routledge, 2019) ISBN 9780367888558
- (editor) Full of Your Glory: Liturgy, Cosmos, Creation (Liturgical Press, 2019) ISBN 9780814664568

== See also ==
- Feminism
- Feminist theology
