= Colby Hall =

Colby Hall can refer to:

== Buildings ==
- Colby Hall (Newton, Massachusetts), listed on the NRHP
- Colby Hall (Normal, Illinois), residence hall Illinois State University
- Colby Hall (Fort Worth, Texas), Colby Hall at Texas Christian University

== People ==
- Colby Hall (writer), Mediaite managing editor
