= Daniel Sharp =

Daniel Sharp or Sharpe may refer to:

- Dan Sharp (born 1962), American football player
- Daniel Sharp (clergyman) (1783–1853), American clergyman
- Daniel Sharp (swimmer) (born 1987), New Zealander Paralympian
- Daniel Sharpe (1806–1856), English geologist
