= Karefa-Smart =

Karefa-Smart is a surname. Notable people with the surname include:

- John Karefa-Smart (1915–2010), Sierra Leonean politician, medical doctor and university professor
- Rena Karefa-Smart (1921–2019), American religious leader and theologian
