= Martin Jean =

American organist

Martin David Jean (born 1960) is an American organist considered to be in the "highest ranks of the world's concert organists". He currently teaches organ at the Yale School of Music, along with James O'Donnell. He has served as Director of the Yale Institute of Sacred Music since 2005, succeeding Margo Fastler. He also serves on the board of directors for the Lutheran Music Program, the parent organization of the Lutheran Summer Music Academy and Festival. He first gained worldwide renown after winning the major organ competitions of Chartres and NYACOP.

== Life ==
He earned his DMA from University of Michigan, where he studied with Robert Glasgow. He was formerly associate professor and university organist at Valparaiso University, where he also directed the University Kantorei. Among his many awards and honors are first place at the international Grand Prix de Chartres in 1986 and first prize in 1992 at the National Young Artists's Competition in Organ Performance, held by the American Guild of Organists. He is well known for his interest in a wide range of organ music. He has recorded works by Tournemire and Vierne. Additionally, in the past fifteen years he has acquired considerable expertise in the field of early music and performance practice, taking a sabbatical in 1999 to study with Harald Vogel in North Germany. His interest in early music was the driving force behind the installation of the noteworthy meantone-temperament organ in Yale University's Marquand Chapel, constructed and installed by Taylor and Boody in the summer of 2007.

== Discography ==
- The Complete Organ Symphonies of Louis Vierne. Martin Jean on the Newberry Memorial Organ, Woolsey Hall, Yale University.
- Tournemire's "The Seven Last Words of Christ". Martin Jean on the Newberry Memorial Organ, Woolsey Hall, Yale University.
- The Reddel Memorial Organ at Valparaiso University. Martin Jean, organist.
- Praise Parisienne. The National Lutheran Choir; David Cherwien, director; Martin Jean, organ.
