= Newton Theological Institution Historic District =

Historic district in Massachusetts, United States

- U.S. National Register of Historic Places
- U.S. Historic district
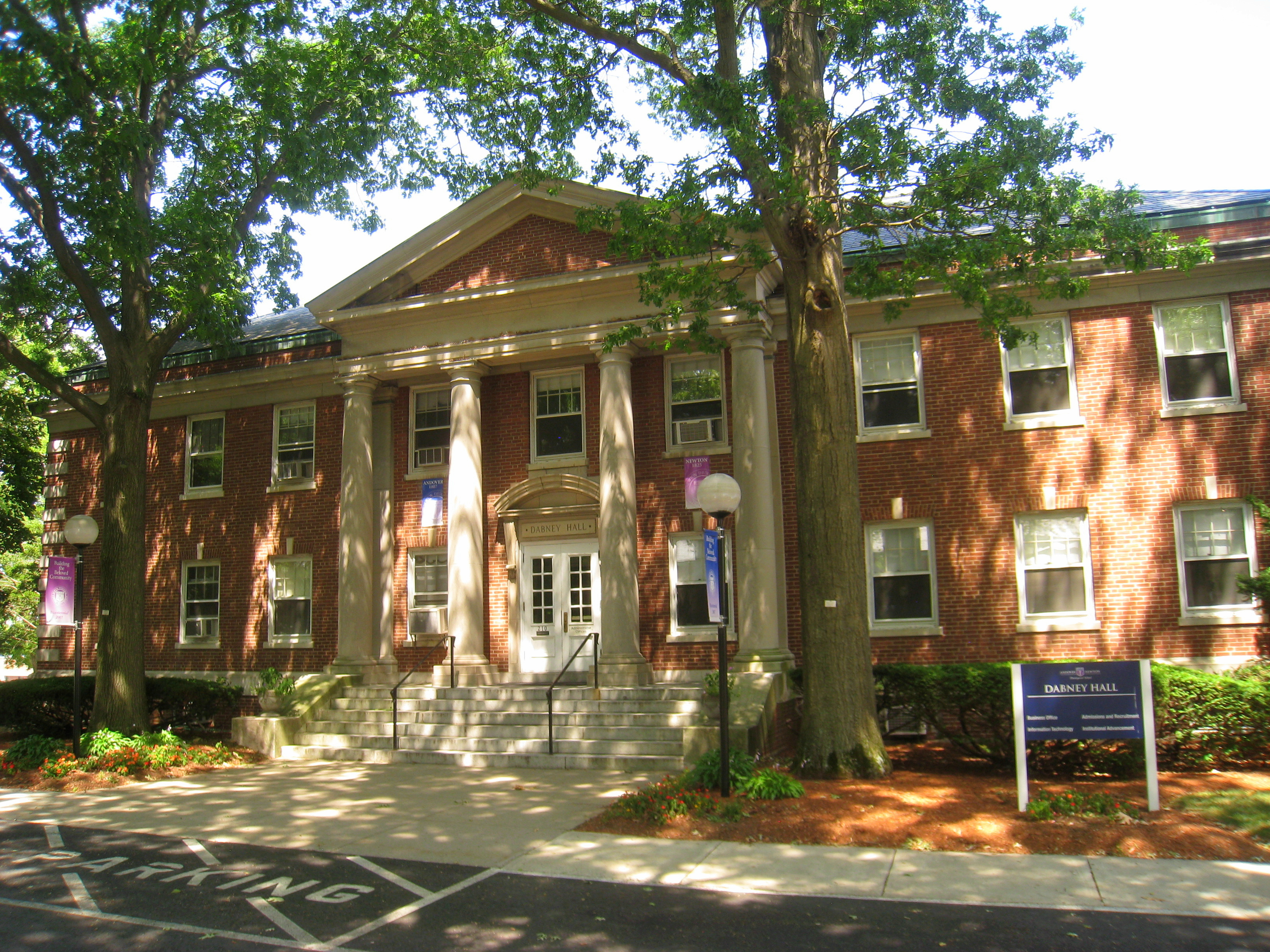
- Dabney Hall, built in 1937

- Location within Massachusetts Location within the United States
- Location: Roughly bounded by Braeland Ave., Ripley St. and Langley Rd., Bowen School Access Rd., and Cypress St., Newton, Massachusetts
- Coordinates: 42.325278°N 71.190278°W
- Area: 44.7 acres (18.1 ha)
- Architectural style: Colonial Revival, Queen Anne, Italianate
- MPS: Newton MRA
- NRHP reference No.: 86001749
- Added to NRHP: September 4, 1986

The Newton Theological Institution Historic District is an historic district in the village of Newton Centre in Newton, Massachusetts. It encompasses not only the campus of the Newton Theological Institution, now known as the Andover Newton Theological School, but also a cluster of fashionable 19th century houses north of the campus, on Herrick Road and Chase and Cypress Streets. The school was the first outside educational institution in Newton. The district was listed on the National Register of Historic Places in 1986.

The Andover Newton Theological School, the nation's oldest interdenominational religious seminary, was founded in 1931 by the merger of two other religious schools: the Newton Theological School, founded in 1825 as the nation's first Baptist seminary, and the Andover Theological Seminary, a Congregational seminary founded in 1807. The property in Newton Centre was purchased in the 1820s by the Baptists, who built the school's oldest surviving building, Farwell Hall, in 1828. Originally Federal in style, it was raised with a mansard roof in 1857. Colby Hall, separately listed on the National Register, was builtin 1866 to accommodate a growing student population. Sturtevant Hall (1873) was followed by Burgess Gymnasium (c. 1880) and Hills Library (1895) before the school merger took place.

Just north of the campus is a small residential area with high-quality mid-to-late 19th century houses, some that have association with the school. The house at 70 Chase Street is probably Newton's finest example of Second Empire styling; it was built for John Sanborn, a Boston merchant and politician. The 1906 Colonial Revival house at 120 Herrick Street may have been built by the school to house visiting teachers. 102 Herrick Street, a Queen Anne/Stick style house built c. 1883 was home to a clergyman.

== Gallery ==
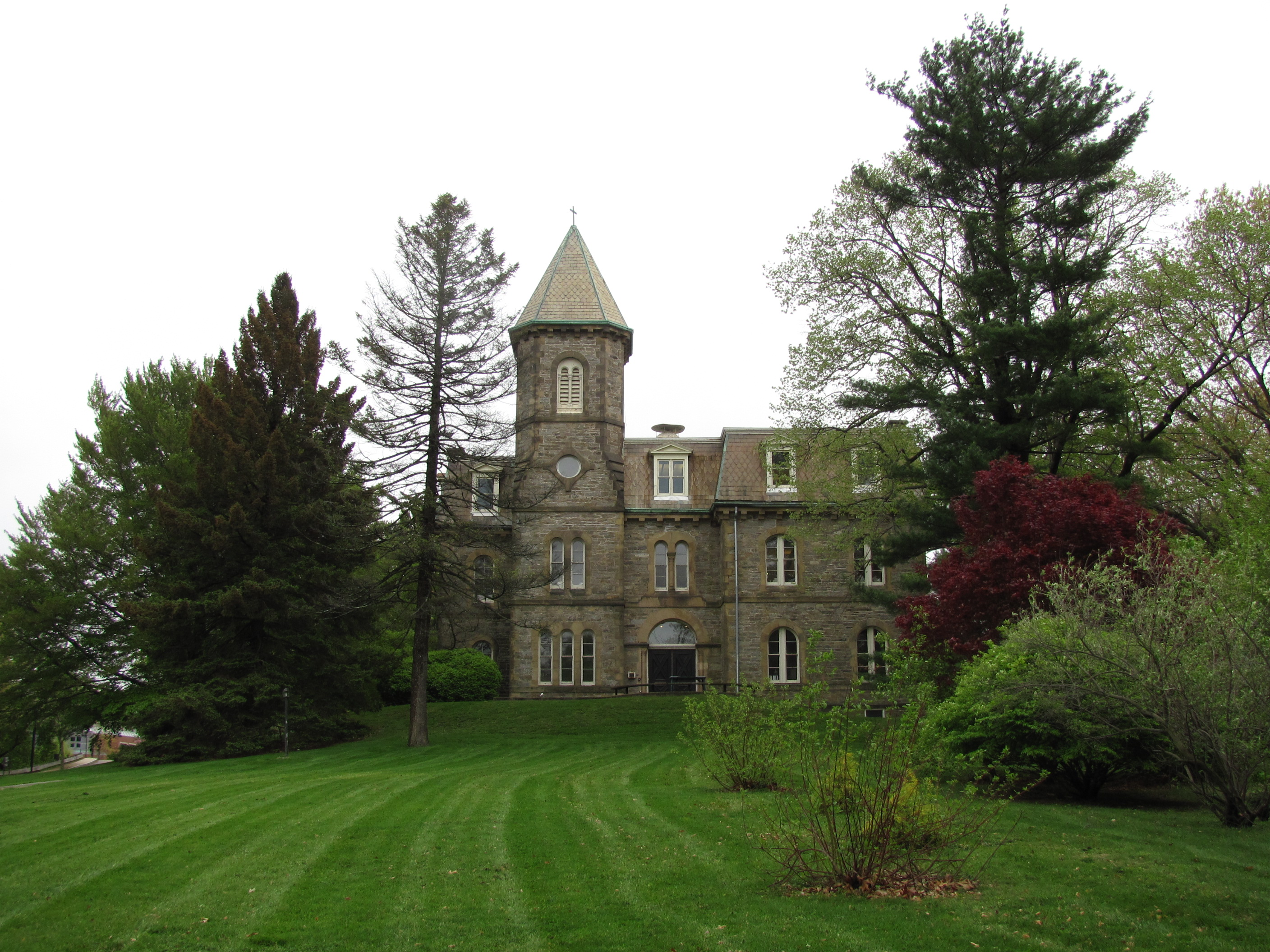
Colby Hall

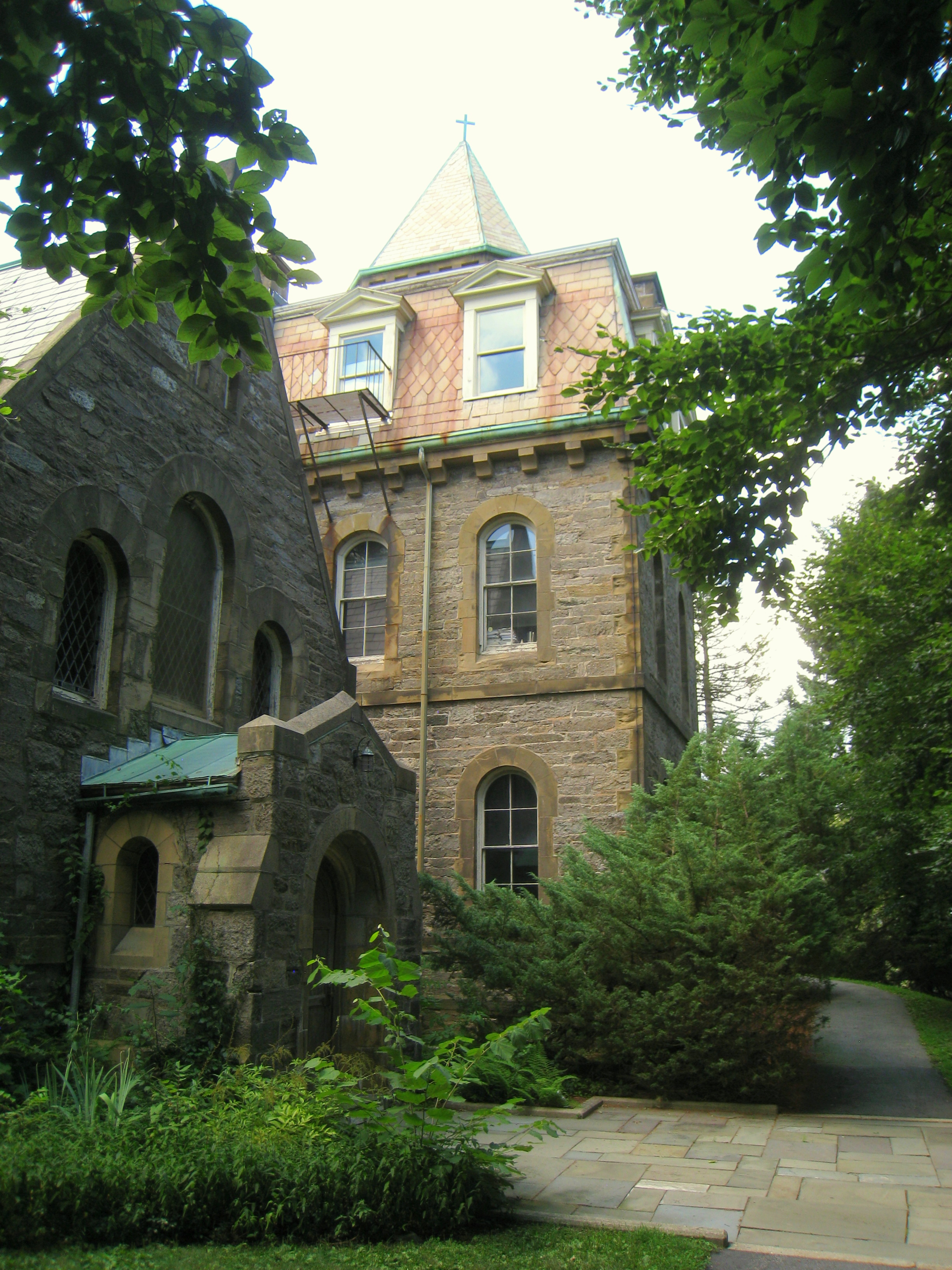
Colby Chapel

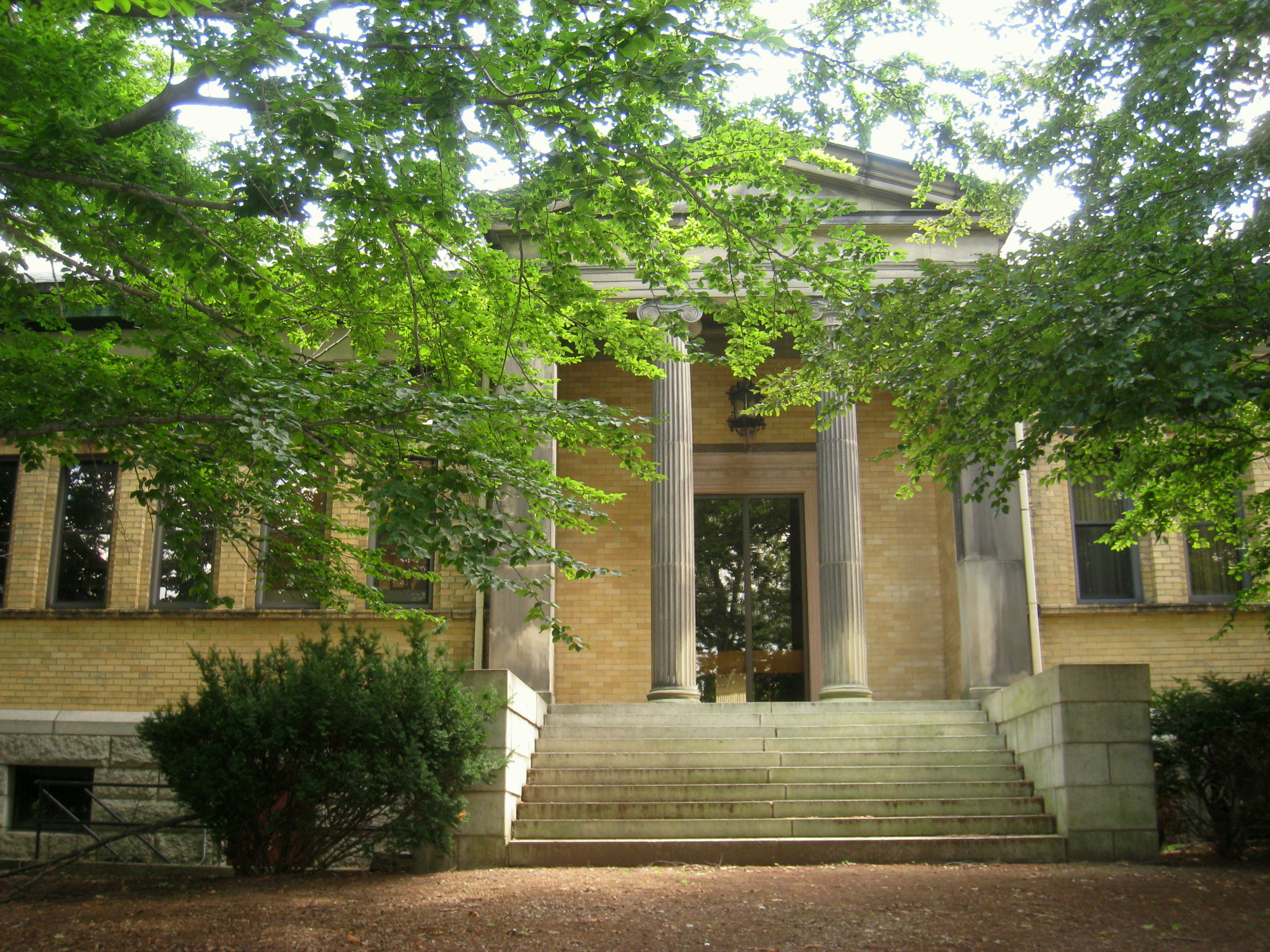
Franklin Trask Library

== See also ==
- National Register of Historic Places listings in Newton, Massachusetts
