= Joseph Grafton =

American pastor

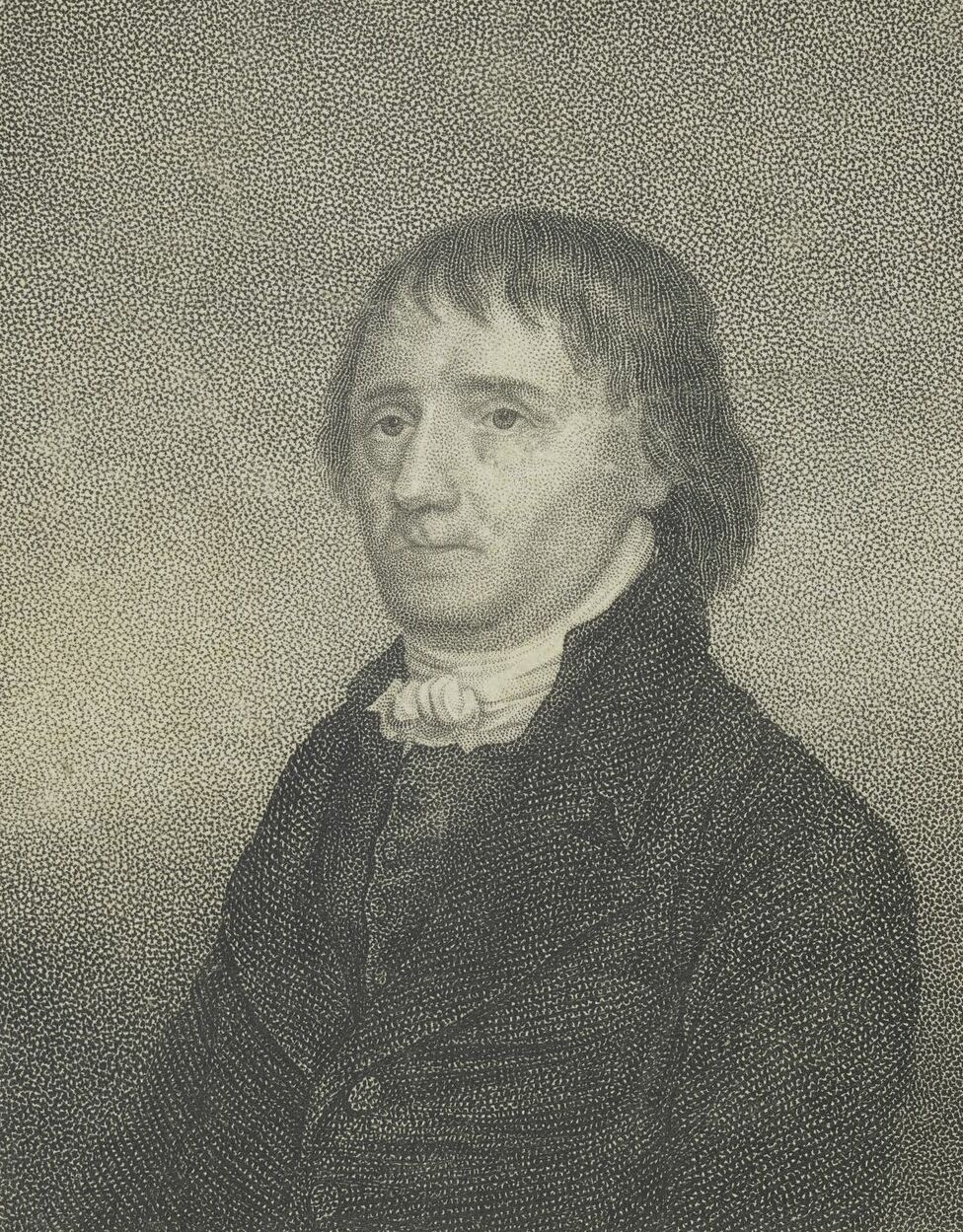

Orders
- Ordination: June 18, 1788 by Isaac Backus and Samuel Stillman

Personal details
- Born: June 9, 1757 Newport, Colony of Rhode Island
- Died: December 16, 1836 (aged 79) Boston, Massachusetts

2nd Pastor of the First Baptist Church in Newton
- In office 1788–1836
- Preceded by: Rev. Caleb Blood
- Succeeded by: Rev. Frederic Augustus Willard

Joseph Grafton (June 9, 1757 – December 16, 1836) was an American minister, a founder of the Newton Theological Institution. For more than forty-eight years he was pastor of the First Baptist Church in Newton, Massachusetts. He was succeeded by the Rev. Frederic Augustus Willard. As the minister of a member church of the (Baptist) Warren Association, Grafton served on committees to advise individuals and churches who were taxed in order to pay the town-supported Congregational minister's salary. He also served as a messenger to associations in other states such as Connecticut and Maine.

In September 1793, members of the Warren Association elected Joseph Grafton as one of twelve founding Trustees of the Baptist Education Fund. The purpose of the fund was to help young men pay for tuition to colleges such as Rhode Island College (Brown University).

Upon his death, the Rev. Daniel Sharp preached a funeral sermon. Grafton's biography, written by Samuel Francis Smith, was published in Boston in 1849.

== Notes and references ==
=== External links ===
- First Baptist Church, Newton, Massachusetts website
