= Rena Karefa-Smart =

American religious leader

- Rena Joyce Weller (later Karefa-Smart), from a 1940 newspaper
- Born: Rena Joyce Weller; March 2, 1921; Bridgeport, Connecticut, United States
- Died: January 9, 2019 (aged 97); Rancho Mirage, California, United States
- Occupations: Religious leader, theologian
- Spouse: John Karefa-Smart

Rena Joyce Weller Karefa-Smart (March 2, 1921 – January 9, 2019) was an American religious leader and theologian. In 1945, she was the first Black woman graduate of Yale Divinity School in 1945, the first Black woman to earn a Doctor of Theology degree from Harvard Divinity School in 1976, and active in world ecumenical organizations.

== Early life and education ==
Rena Joyce Weller was born in Bridgeport, Connecticut, the daughter of Sailsman William Weller and Rosa Lee Lowery Weller. Her Jamaican-born father was an ordained clergyman in the AME Zion denomination; her mother was a leader in churchwork as well, as national president of the AMEZ denomination's Woman's Home and Foreign Missionary Society, and as president of the Connecticut State Union of Women.

She trained as a teacher at the Teachers College of Connecticut, where she was the youngest member of the graduating class of 1940, and played softball and volleyball. She earned a master's degree in religious education from Drew Theological Seminary in 1942. She completed a bachelor of divinity degree from Yale Divinity School in 1945, studying with H. Richard Niebuhr and Liston Pope. She earned a Doctor of Theology degree from Harvard Divinity School in 1976, the first Black woman to do so. Her Harvard thesis was titled "An analysis of representative official statements by the World Council of Churches on the problem of race" (1976).

== Career ==
Weller was president of the National Council of AME Zion Young People, and secretary of the United Christian Youth Movement. She was a leader of the World Student Christian Federation. She was an ordained Episcopal priest and a minister in the AME Zion denomination. She taught at Hood Theological Seminary for two years as a young woman.

Karefa-Smart served the Episcopal Diocese of Washington as an ecumenical officer, and associate in the Center for Theology and Public Policy. She attended the first and second assemblies of the World Council of Churches (WCC) in 1948 and 1954, and worked to create the WCC's Program to Combat Racism. She taught Christian ethics at Howard University School of Divinity, and was the first female professor to gain tenure there, in 1979. She received the Yale Divinity School's Lux et Veritas alumni award in 2017.

== Publications ==
- "Africa asks questions of the West" (1957)
- The Halting Kingdom: Christianity and the African Revolution (1959, with John Karefa-Smart)
- "The ecumenical challenge of united and uniting churches" (1995)

== Personal life ==
Rena Weller married Sierra Leonean physician and diplomat John Karefa-Smart in 1948. They lived in Africa, Europe, the Caribbean, and North America as his work required. They had three children. Her son died in 1988, her husband died in 2010, and she died in 2019, at the age of 97, in Rancho Mirage, California. The World Council of Churches stated, in tribute, that Karefa-Smart was "a champion for global ecumenism over the course of a long and distinguished career."
