= Colby Hall (Newton, Massachusetts) =

- U.S. National Register of Historic Places
- U.S. Historic district – Contributing property
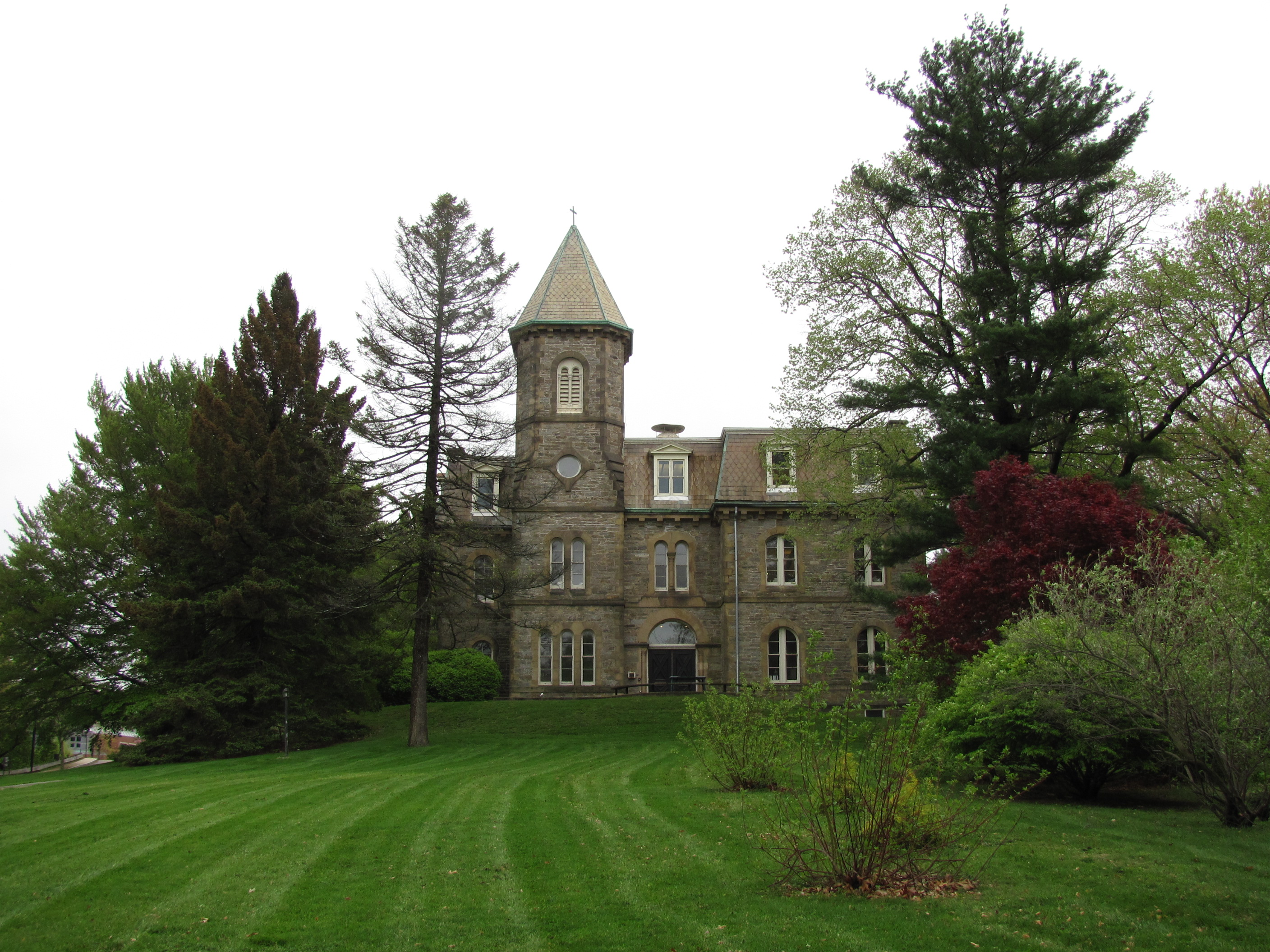
- Colby Hall

- Location within Massachusetts Location within the United States
- Location: 141 Herrick Rd., Newton Centre, Massachusetts
- Coordinates: 42°19′33.7″N 71°11′29.3″W
- Built: 1866
- Architectural style: Second Empire, Romanesque
- Part of: Newton Theological Institution Historic District (ID86001749)
- NRHP reference No.: 78000459

Significant dates
- Added to NRHP: January 30, 1978
- Designated CP: September 4, 1986

Colby Hall is an historic building on the campus of Andover Newton Theological School at 141 Herrick Road in the village of Newton Centre in Newton, Massachusetts. It was built in 1866 in a mixture of Second Empire and Romanesque styles. It was named for Gardner Colby (1810–79), who was treasurer of the school and also was the benefactor of Waterville College in Maine, which changed its name to Colby College in his honor. On January 30, 1978. it was added to the National Register of Historic Places.

In 1977, Colby Hall was renovated by Drummey Rosane Anderson, Inc. (D-R-A) to serve as its design center.

== See also ==
- National Register of Historic Places listings in Newton, Massachusetts
