= Lucius Walker =

American Baptist minister

Lucius Walker (August 3, 1930 – September 7, 2010) was an American Baptist minister who served as executive director of the Interreligious Foundation for Community Organization in the 1960s and was a persistent advocate for ending the United States embargo against Cuba. He made multiple trips to Cuba with supplies provided in violation of the embargo.

== Biography ==
Walker was born on August 3, 1930, in Roselle, New Jersey and was recognized for his preaching skills by the time he was in his teens. He earned his undergraduate degree from Shaw University and then earned a Doctor of Divinity degree from Andover Newton Theological School as part of his "love affair with the teachings of Jesus" and received his ordination in 1958. He later earned a master's degree from the University of Wisconsin, where he majored in social work.

During the 1960s Walker served as executive director of the Interreligious Foundation for Community Organization, where he pushed for greater cooperation between local religious organizations in helping to improve declining neighborhoods, saying in 1969 that "It's a travesty how much churches have said about social justice and how little they have done". Rabbi Marc H. Tanenbaum, who had been the foundation's president, pulled the American Jewish Congress out of the organization in protest against a demand that religious organizations allot $500 million as reparations for slavery. Walker was named associate general secretary of the National Council of Churches in 1973 and returned to the Interreligious Foundation for Community Organization in 1978 after he had been fired for making excessive contributions to community organizers.

In August 1988, Walker was wounded while on a river boat traveling to the Bluefields region on the East coast on Nicaragua that was attacked by Contras.Two people were killed. Walker said he had come "face to face with the terrorism of our own government" and blamed President Ronald Reagan for the deaths. This event led Walker to create Pastors for Peace, to fight what he saw as American imperialism. The organization made aid shipments to Latin America providing tons of much-needed supplies.

As part of Pastors for Peace, Walker made 21 annual missions to Cuba, what he called "friendshipments", by way of Canada and Mexico. During his final trip, in July 2010, Walker brought medical equipment, including EKG machines, incubators and medicines. Despite offers to assist in all of the processes necessary to obtain licenses needed to make the shipments on a legal basis, Walker refused to cooperate in what he saw as an unjust process. Following his death, Granma, the official newspaper of the Central Committee of the Cuban Communist Party, stated that "Cubans, in gratitude, have to say that we don't want to think of a world without Lucius Walker".

A resident of Demarest, New Jersey, Walker died at age 80 on September 7, 2010, at his home there of a heart attack. He was survived by three daughters, two sons and three grandchildren. His wife, the former Mary Johnson, died in 2008.
