= Irah Chase =

American Baptist clergyman and educator (1793–1864)

Irah Chase (born at Stratton, Vermont, October 5, 1793; died at Newtonville, Massachusetts, November 1, 1864) was a United States Baptist clergyman.

He was the first professor of Newton Theological Institution.

== Biography ==
He was educated at Middlebury College and Andover Theological Seminary, and was ordained in 1817.

After laboring as a Baptist missionary in the western part of Virginia, he switched to teaching in 1818. He became a professor in a new theological school at Philadelphia, which was soon after transferred to Washington, D.C., to become the theological department of the newly chartered Columbian College. In this office he remained seven years, one of which he spent in Europe. In 1825 he was prominent in establishing the Newton Theological Institution at Newton Centre, Massachusetts and taught Biblical Theology and Church History there. He resigned in 1845, in order to devote himself to theological and literary studies. During a visit to Europe in 1830 he aided in founding the Baptist mission in France.

== Works ==
- Remarks on the Book of Daniel, 1844
- The Life of John Bunyan, 1847
- The Design of Baptism, 1851
- The Work claiming to be the Constitution of the Holy Apostles, revised from the Greek
- Infant Baptism an Invention of Man, 1863
- The Apostolic Constitutions

He wrote many sermons, essays, and contributions to reviews on questions of church history and doctrine.

== Family ==
He married Harriet Savage in 1821. They had seven children, five of whom survived infancy. She died in 1834, and in 1835 he married Martha Raymond, with whom he had two children, one of whom survived infancy. Martha died in 1846.
