= Arthur Luther Whitaker =

Rev. Dr. Arthur L. Whitaker.

Arthur L. Whitaker (July 23, 1921 – October 16, 2007) was an American minister, professor, psychologist, sociologist, writer and World War II army veteran.

A Baptist minister, Whitaker graduated from the Harvard Divinity School in (1952). Whitaker was appointed as an executive minister within the American Baptist Churches USA, a position he held from 1978 to 1983.

== Early life and military service ==
Born and raised in Massachusetts, Whitaker was a National Honor Society graduate at Malden High School, where he also participated in marching band, student government and various sports including track and field, where he held the record for the 100m dash for over 50 years.

After his graduation, Whitaker was drafted into the United States Army on March 5, 1943. In the army he was the band leader and first trumpet for the Ninth Cavalry Army band. After serving for three years he was honorably discharged as a technical sergeant (January 12, 1946). He received four battle stars for tours in Tunisia, Naples, Foggia, Rhineland and Central Europe under General Patton. Along with these he was also awarded with the Good Conduct Medal, the Victory Medal and the European African Middle Eastern Theater Campaign Ribbon.

== Ministry and beyond ==
Upon returning to the United States, Reverend Whitaker married Virginia A. Carter in 1948, and together they had four sons, Ronald, Paul, Mark and Keith.

After graduating from Harvard Divinity School where he earned his S.T.D. (doctorate in sacred theology), he went on to get his S.T.M. (masters in sacred theology) from Andover Newton Theological School (1954).

Following college, Whitaker moved his family to Rochester, NY where he served as a minister at the Mt. Olivet Baptist Church, and taught sociology at the University of Rochester. During the Reverend's time here while the nation was immersed in the Civil Rights Movement he wrote the thesis Anatomy of a Riot documenting the Rochester 1964 race riot, which was put into the National Congressional Record soon after it was written.

For a short time after, the Reverend and his family moved to St. Paul, MN where he was the minister at the Pilgrim Baptist Church founded by escaped slaves in 1863.

When this tour was over he moved his family back to Boston, MA. Here he started work for the American Baptist Churches of Massachusetts as an associate minister stationed at the Tremont Temple. In 1973 he received his doctorate degree from Andover Newton Theological and Missions College in Ministry and became certified as a licensed psychologist in the Commonwealth of Massachusetts.

The American Baptist Churches of New York called Whitaker back in 1978 to serve as the executive minister, which he did until 1983. He had the honor of being appointed as executive minister within The American Baptist Churches of America. In 1984 the Reverend moved to Randolph, MA permanently where he began teaching and counseling at Harvard Divinity School. Retiring in 2001, at 80 years of age, he continued his psychology practice and served as an interim minister at various churches in the greater Boston area.

Throughout his lifetime as a minister and teacher he published many articles in magazines and newspapers. His name was entered in "Who's Who in The East, "Who's Who in America", "Who's Who Among Black Americans" and "Who's Who in Religion" throughout the 1960s and 1980s. He continued his ministry and counseling via hospitals and churches until his death in 2007.
