= Yale Divinity School =

Graduate school of Yale University

Coordinates: 41°19′24″N 72°55′17″W

- Coat of arms of the school with the university's Urim V'Thummim motto under a cross and halo
- Former name: Yale School of Religion
- Motto: Lux et Veritas
- Motto in English: Light and Truth
- Type: Private
- Established: 1822; 204 years ago
- Parent institution: Yale University
- Accreditation: Association of Theological Schools
- Religious affiliation: Interdenominational and nonsectarian
- Endowment: $670 million
- Dean: Gregory E. Sterling
- Students: 287 (2025)
- Location: New Haven, Connecticut, U.S.
- Mascot: Heavenly Dan
- Website: divinity.yale.edu

Yale Divinity School (YDS) is one of the twelve graduate and professional schools of Yale University in New Haven, Connecticut.

Congregationalist theological education was the motivation at the founding of Yale, and the professional school has its roots in a Theological Department established in 1822. The school had maintained its own campus, faculty, and degree program since 1869, and it has become more ecumenical beginning in the mid-19th century. Since the 1970s, it has been affiliated with the Episcopal Berkeley Divinity School and has housed the Institute of Sacred Music, which offers separate degree programs. In July 2017, a two-year process of formal affiliation was completed, with the addition of Andover Newton Seminary joining the school. Over 40 different denominations are represented at YDS.

As of 2026, Yale Divinity School is the most selective divinity school in the world.

== History ==
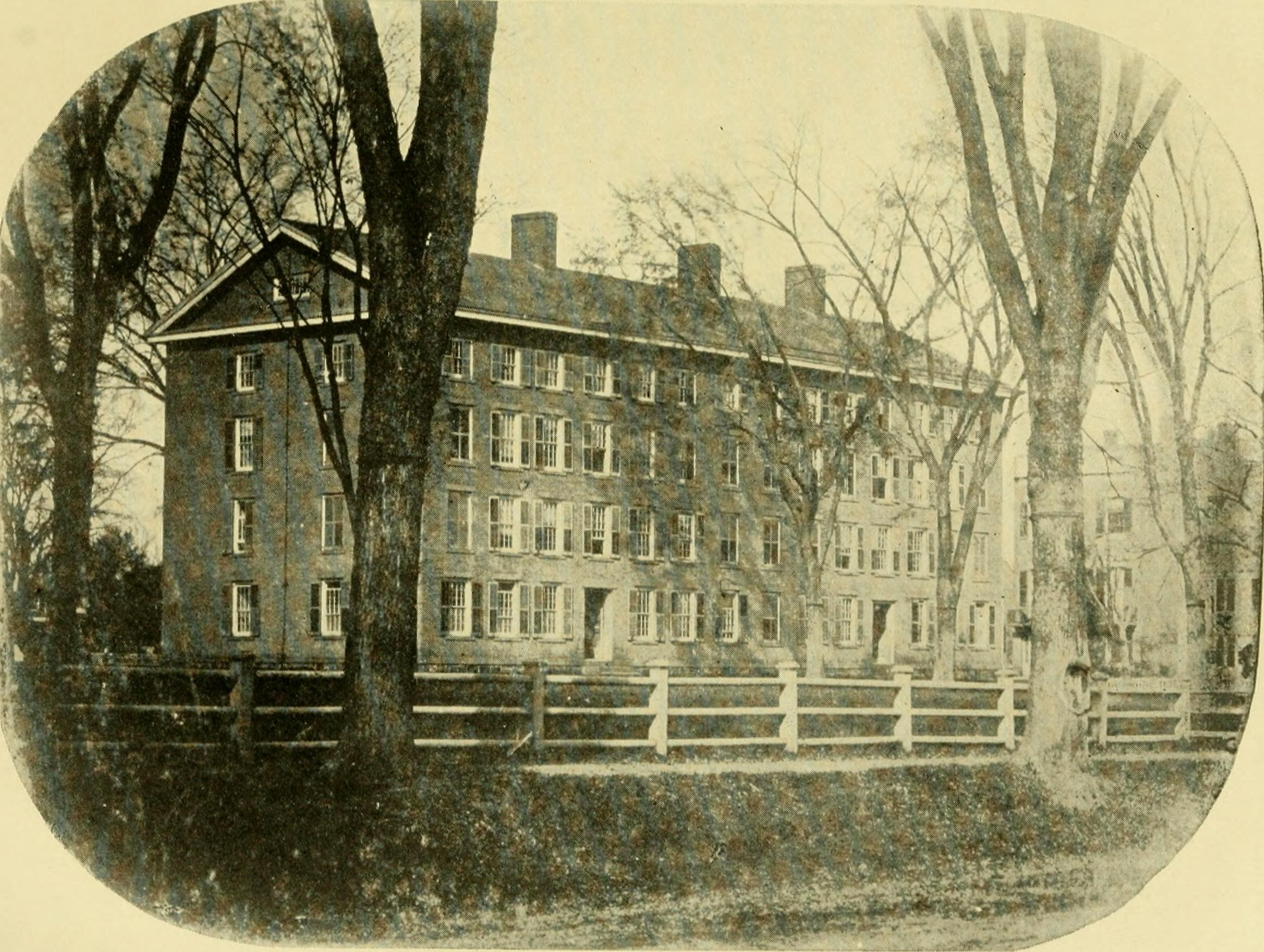
The Divinity College dormitory on the Old Campus, completed in 1836

Theological education was the earliest academic purpose of Yale University. When Yale College was founded in 1701, it was as a college of religious training for Congregationalist ministers in Connecticut Colony, designated in its charter as a school "wherein Youth may be instructed in the Arts & Sciences who through the blessing of Almighty God may be fitted for Publick employment both in Church & Civil State." A professorship of divinity was established in 1746. In 1817, the occupant of the divinity chair, Eleazar Thompson Fitch, supported a student request to endow a theological curriculum, and five years later a separate Yale Theological Seminary was founded by the Yale Corporation. In the same motion, Second Great Awakening theologian Nathaniel William Taylor was appointed to become the first Dwight Professor of Didactic Theology. Taylor was considered the "central figure" in the school's founding, and he was joined in 1826 by Josiah Willard Gibbs, Sr., a scholar of sacred languages and lexicographer Chauncey A. Goodrich in 1839. A dedicated student dormitory, Divinity College, was completed on the college's Old Campus in 1836, but the department had no permanent classrooms or offices until several years after the end of the American Civil War.

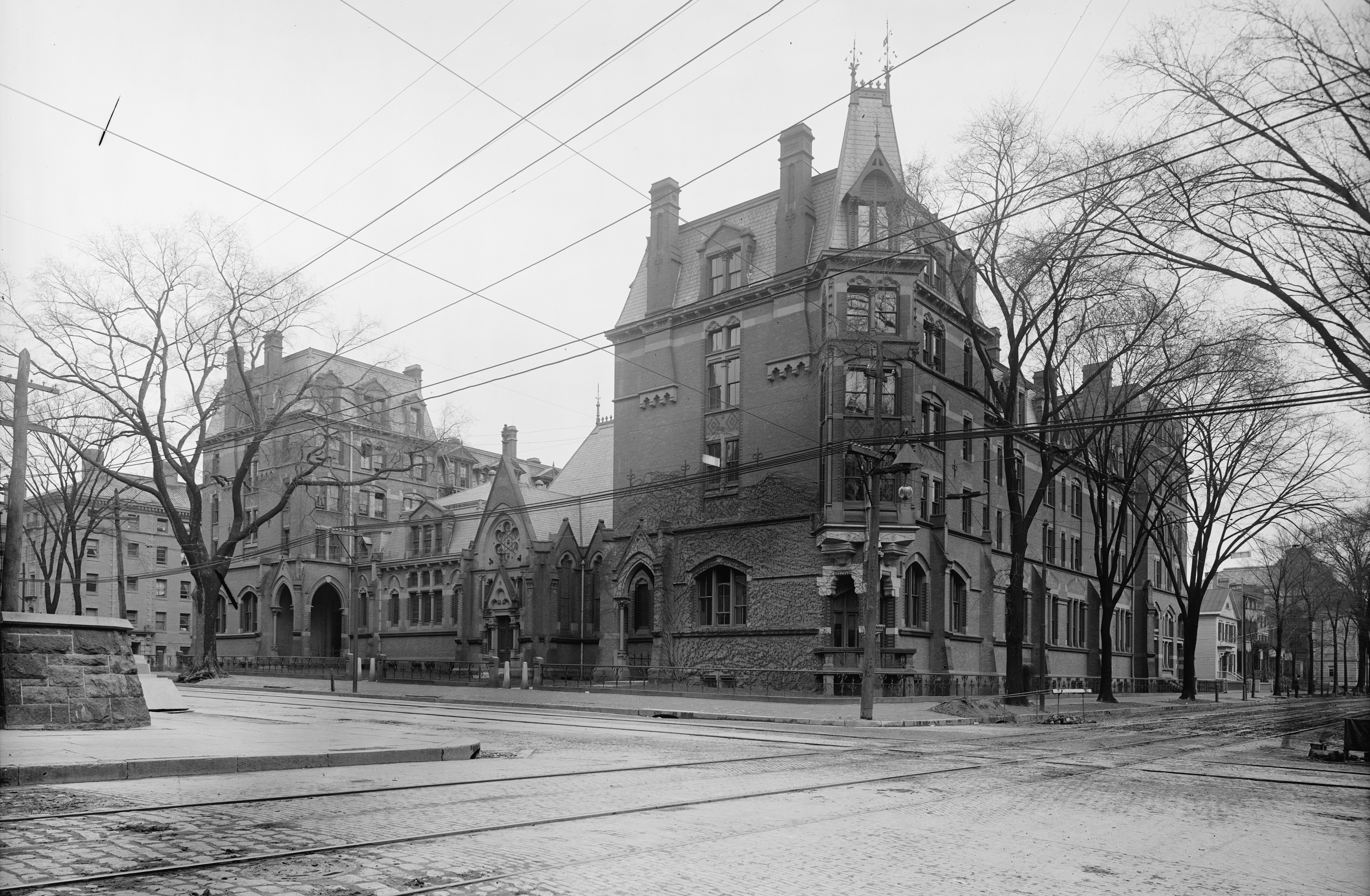
Divinity Hall, occupied from 1870 to 1931, viewed from the New Haven Green.

After a significant period of enrollment decline, the school began fundraising from alumni for new faculty and facilities. Divinity Hall was constructed on the present-day site of Grace Hopper College between 1869 and 1871, featuring two classroom wings and a chapel. Around the time of the new campus' construction came the arrival of new faculty, including James M. Hoppin, George Edward Day, George Park Fisher, and Leonard Bacon. The first Bachelor of Divinity (B.D.) was conferred in 1867, and the department became a separate School of Divinity in 1869. The school remained across from Old Campus until 1929, when a new campus was constructed on the northern edge of the university campus, at the top of Prospect Hill.

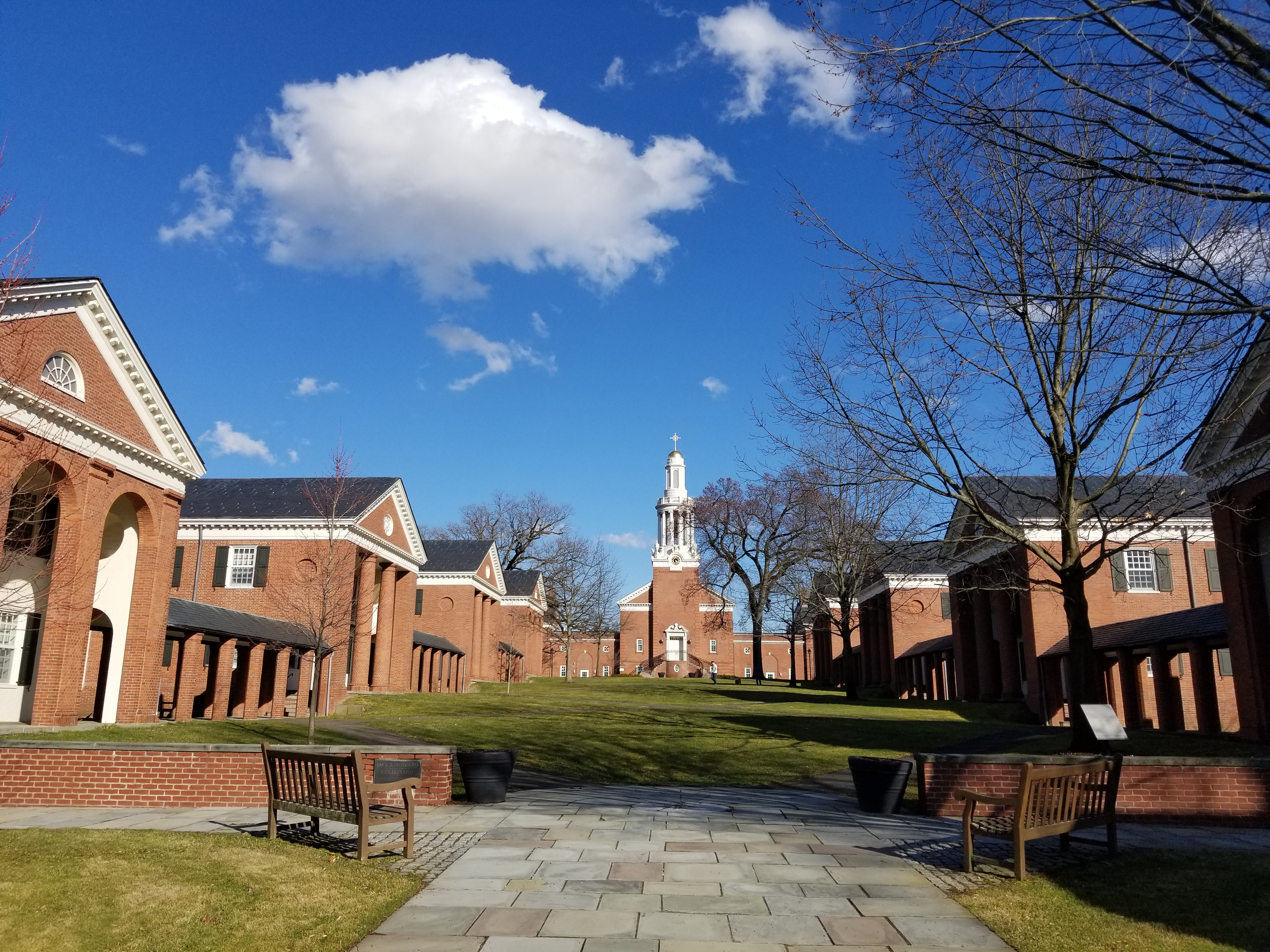
Sterling Divinity Quadrangle

Berkeley Divinity School affiliated with Yale Divinity School in 1971, and in the same year the university replaced the B.D. with a Master of Divinity (M.Div.) program. While Berkeley retains its Episcopal Church connection, its students are admitted by and fully enrolled as members of Yale Divinity School. The Jonathan Edwards Center at Yale University, a division of the Divinity School, maintains a large collection of primary source materials about Jonathan Edwards, a 1720 Yale alumnus. The Yale Institute of Sacred Music (ISM) is jointly-affiliated with the Divinity School and School of Music. It offers programs in choral conducting, organ performance, voice, and church music studies, and in liturgical studies and religion and the arts.

In May 2016, Andover Newton Theological School president Martin Copenhaver announced that Andover Newton would begin a process of formal affiliation with the Divinity School over the next two years. In the 2016–17 academic year, a cohort of faculty relocated to New Haven teaching students and launching pilot initiatives focused on congregational ministry education, while Andover Newton continued to operate in Massachusetts over the next two years. In July 2017, a formal affiliation was signed, resulting in smaller Andover Newton functioning as a unit within Yale Divinity School, similar to its arrangement with Berkeley.

In October 2020, YDS received a $1 million grant from the Lilly Endowment as part of the foundation's Thriving Congregations Initiative to fund a program entitled, "Reimagining Church: New Models for the 21st Century." Reimagining Church will involve 40 congregations in Connecticut as well as YDS students, faculty, and staff over a five-year period.

In November 2020, the Yale Divinity School Women's Center revived the publication of The Voice Journal of Literary and Theological Ideas, a feminist journal that initially ran from 1996 to 2002.

=== Deans ===
When the Divinity school was first established in 1822, there were no deans, instead the presidents of Yale presided over Divinity School faculty meetings. This occurred during the preseidencies of both Jeremiah Day (1817–1846) and Theodore Dwight Woolsey (1846–1871).

Beginning with the appointment of George Edward Day in 1888, there has been a dean of the Yale Divinity School. Gregory Sterling, a New Testament scholar and Church of Christ pastor, has been the dean of the divinity school since 2012, succeeding New Testament scholar Harold W. Attridge, who returned to teaching as a Sterling Professor upon completing two five-year terms as dean. The leaders of the affiliated seminaries are Andrew McGowan, Dean and President of Berkeley Divinity School, and Sarah Drummond, Founding Dean of Andover Newton Seminary at Yale Divinity School. Organist Martin Jean is director of the Institute of Sacred Music.

| Name | Years served | Academic field | Denomination |
|---|---|---|---|
| Gregory E. Sterling | 2012–present | New Testament | Churches of Christ |
| Harold W. Attridge | 2002–2012 | New Testament | Catholic |
| Rebecca Chopp | 2001–2002 | Theology | Methodist |
| Harry B. Adams (acting) | 2000–2001 | Pastoral Theology | Church of Christ |
| Richard J. Wood | 1996–2000 | Philosophy | Quaker |
| Thomas Ogletree | 1990–1996 | Ethics | Methodist |
| Aidan Kavanagh (acting) | 1989–1990 | Liturgics | Catholic |
| Leander Keck | 1979–1989 | New Testament | Disciples of Christ |
| Colin W. Williams | 1969–1979 | Ethics | Methodist |
| Robert Clyde Johnson | 1963–1969 | Theology | Presbyterian |
| Charles Forman (acting) | 1961–1963 | Missiology | Presbyterian |
| Liston Pope | 1949–1962 | Ethics | Congregationalist |
| Luther Allan Weigle | 1928–1949 | Christian Education | Congregationalist/Lutheran |
| Charles Reynolds Brown | 1911–1928 | Theology | Congregationalist |
| Edward Lewis Curtis (acting) | 1905–1911 | Hebrew | |
| Frank Knight Sanders | 1901–1905 | Semitic languages | Congregationalist |
| George Park Fisher | 1895–1901 | Church History | Congregationalist |
| George Edward Day | 1888–1895 | Hebrew | Congregationalist |

== Academics ==
Yale Divinity School is accredited by the Association of Theological Schools in the United States and Canada (ATS) and approved by ATS to grant the following degrees:

- Master of Divinity (M.Div.)
- Master of Arts in Religion (M.A.R.)
- Master of Sacred Theology (S.T.M.)

== Campus ==
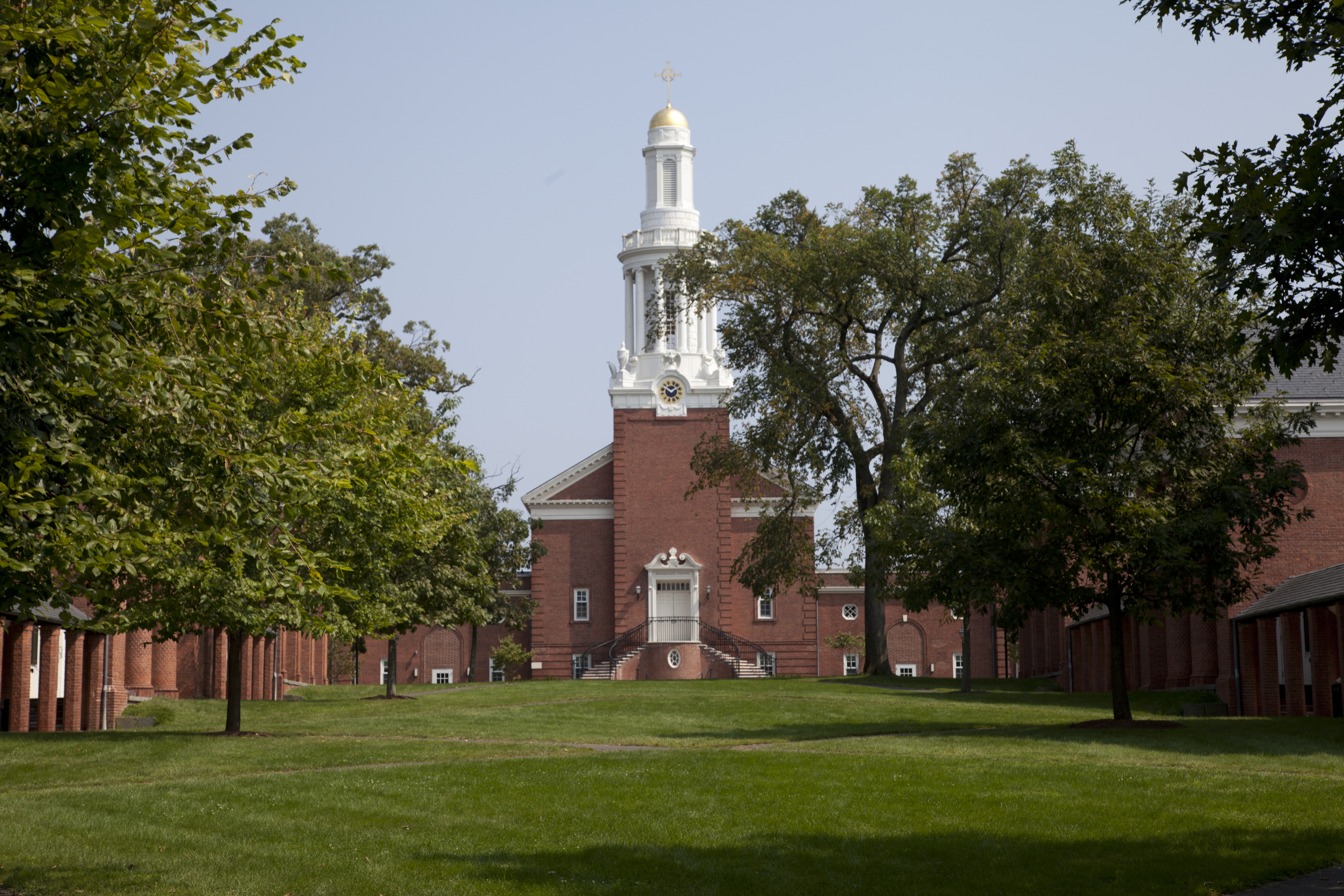
Sterling Divinity Quadrangle, campus of the Yale Divinity School

When the department was organized as a school in 1869, it was moved to a campus across from the northwest corner of the New Haven Green composed of East Divinity Hall (1869), Marquand Chapel (1871), West Divinity Hall (1871), and the Trowbridge Library (1881). The buildings, designed by Richard Morris Hunt, were demolished under the residential college plan and replaced by Calhoun College, now known as Grace Hopper College.

In 1929, the trustees of the estate of lawyer John William Sterling agreed that a portion of his bequest to Yale would be used to build a new campus for the Divinity School. The Sterling Divinity Quadrangle, completed in 1932, is a Georgian-style complex built at the top of Prospect Hill. It was designed by Delano & Aldrich and modeled in part on the University of Virginia.

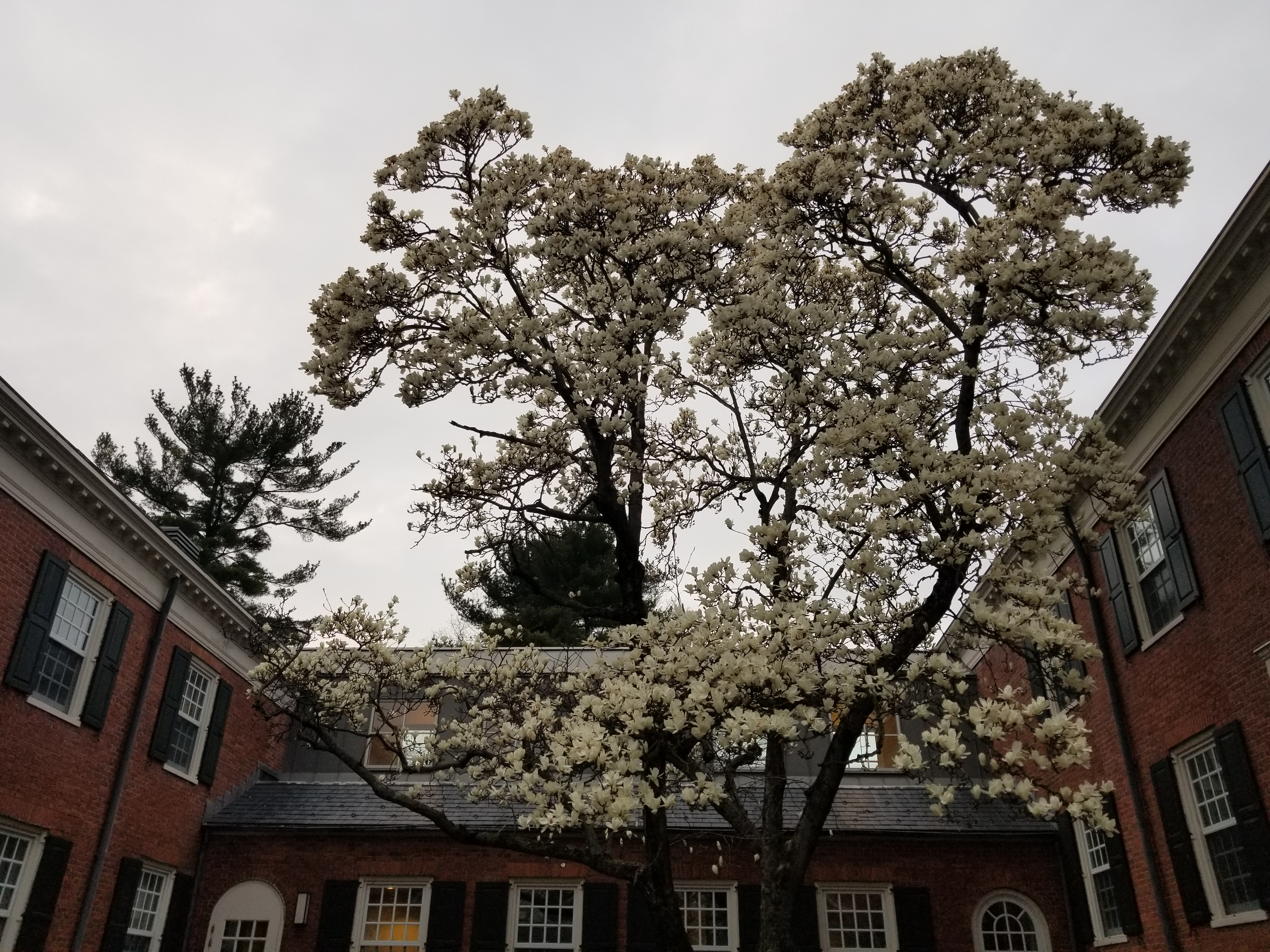
Courtyard at Sterling Divinity Quadrangle

A $49-million renovation of Sterling Divinity Quadrangle was completed in 2003. Sterling Divinity Quadrangle contains academic buildings, Marquand Chapel, and graduate student housing for YDS students.

Yale Divinity School is currently planning the construction of the Living Village, a zero-waste, sustainable living community that will house 155 YDS students.

== Notable alumni ==
=== Government and politics ===
- John D. Baldwin (B.D. 1834), U.S. Representative for Massachusetts's 8th congressional district
- Lois Capps (M.A.R. 1964), U.S. Representative for California's 24th congressional district
- Walter Holden Capps (M.A.R. 1963; Ph.D. 1965), U.S. Representative for California's 22nd congressional district
- William Sloane Coffin (B.D. 1956), Central Intelligence Agency officer
- Chris Coons (M.A.R. 1992), U.S. Senator from Delaware
- John Danforth (M.Div. 1963), U.S. Senator from Missouri
- Walter Fauntroy (B.D. 1958), U.S. Representative for the District of Columbia
- Robert Bernard Hall (B.D. 1835), U.S. Representative for Massachusetts's 1st congressional district
- Gary Hart (B.D. 1961), U.S. Senator from Colorado
- Guy Vander Jagt (B.D. 1955), U.S. Representative for Michigan's 9th congressional district
- James A. Joseph (B.D. 1963), U.S. Ambassador to South Africa
- Sen Katayama (Attended), founder of the Japanese Communist Party
- James T. Laney (B.D. 1954), U.S. Ambassador to South Korea
- Ernest W. Lefever (B.D. 1945), foreign affairs expert and founder of the Ethics and Public Policy Center.
- Chang Sang (M.Div. 1970), Prime Minister of South Korea
- David E. Price (B.D. 1964), U.S. Representative for North Carolina's 4th congressional district

=== Academia ===
- Kate Bowler (M.A.R. 2005), academic and writer
- Donald Eric Capps (B.D. 1963; S.T.M. 1965), scholar of Pastoral Theology
- Harvey Cox (B.D. 1955), theologian and Hollis Professor of Divinity at Harvard Divinity School
- Raymond Culver, (B.D. 1920), President of Shimer College
- David F. Ford (S.T.M.), Regius Professor of Divinity Emeritus at the University of Cambridge
- Milton Gaither (M.A.R. 1996), historian of American education
- Serene Jones (M.Div. 1985), President of Union Theological Seminary
- Candida Moss (M.A.R. 2002), Edward Cadbury Professor of Theology at the University of Birmingham
- Reinhold Niebuhr (B.D. 1914, M.A. 1915), philosopher and public intellectual
- Douglas Oldenburg (S.T.M. 1961), President Emeritus of Columbia Theological Seminary
- George Rupp (B.D. 1967), 18th President of Columbia University
- John Silber (Attended 1947-1948), 7th President of Boston University
- Rena Karefa-Smart (B.D. 1945), first Black woman to graduate from Yale Divinity School
- Rufus W. Stimson (B.D., 1897), Professor of English and President of the University of Connecticut
- Krista Tippett (M.Div. 1994), National Humanities Medal and Peabody Award winner
- John W. Traphagan (M.A.R. 1986), Professor of Religious Studies and Anthropology at the University of Texas at Austin

=== Religious leadership ===
- William Ragsdale Cannon (B.D. 1940; Ph.D. 1942), Bishop of the United Methodist Church
- Roy Clyde Clark (B.D. 1944), Bishop of the United Methodist Church
- Michael Curry (M.Div. 1978), 27th Presiding Bishop of the Episcopal Church
- Paul Vernon Galloway (B.D. 1929), Bishop of The Methodist Church
- Allen Kannapell (M.Div. 1997), Suffragan Bishop of the Anglican Diocese of the Great Lakes
- Boise Kimber (S.T.M.), president of the National Baptist Convention
- James Massa (M.A.R. 1985), Auxiliary Bishop of Brooklyn

=== Other ===
- Diogenes Allen (B.D. 1959)
- Ian Barbour (B.D. 1956)
- Gregory A. Boyd (M.Div. 1982)
- Will D. Campbell (B.D. 1952)
- Orishatukeh Faduma (B.D. 1894, graduate study 1895)
- Frederick William Chapman (A.M. 1832), Congregational minister, educator, and genealogist
- Zebulon Crocker
- Tom Vaughn (Doctorate in theology), jazz musician and Episcopal priest
- Leroy Gilbert (S.T.M. 1979)
- Lisa Grabarek, Baptist preacher and teacher
- Stanley Hauerwas (B.D. 1965)
- Richard B. Hays (M.Div. 1977)
- Sallie McFague (B.D. 1959)
- Otis Moss III (M.Div. 1995), Pastor of Trinity Church, Chicago
- Richard T. Nolan (M.A. 1967)
- Ashley Null (M.Div., S.T.M.), Anglican theologian
- William H. Poteat (B.D. 1944)
- Clark V. Poling (1936)
- Peter L. Pond, human rights activist and philanthropist.
- Adam Clayton Powell, Sr. (attended 1895–1896)
- V.C. Samuel (PhD. 1957), Theologian and Historian.
- Ron Sider
- Amos Alonzo Stagg
- Barbara Brown Taylor (M.Div. 1976)
- Roy M. Terry (B.D. 1942)
- R. A. Torrey (B.D. 1878)
- Glenn M. Wagner (M.Div. 1978)
- Chester Wickwire (B.D. 1946)
- Parker T. Williamson (M.Phil.)
- William Willimon (M.Div. 1971)

== Notable past professors ==
=== Former faculty: 20th–21st centuries ===
- Roland Bainton
- Brevard Childs
- Rebecca Chopp
- Adela Yarbro Collins, 2000–2015
- Jerome Davis
- Margaret Farley
- Hans Wilhelm Frei
- Serene Jones
- David Kelsey
- Kenneth Scott Latourette
- George Lindbeck
- Sallie McFague
- Douglas Clyde Macintosh
- Abraham Malherbe
- Reinhold Niebuhr
- H. Richard Niebuhr
- Henri Nouwen, 1971–1981
- Liston Pope (Dean)
- Letty M. Russell (1974–2001)
- Lamin Sanneh
- Christopher Seitz
- Emilie Townes
- Denys Turner
- Nicholas Wolterstorff
- Henry Burt Wright (1877-1923)

=== Former faculty: 19th century ===
- Lyman Beecher
- George Park Fisher

== Current faculty ==
- Harold W. Attridge
- William Barber II
- Teresa Berger
- John J. Collins
- Bruce Gordon
- Margaret A. Farley
- Margot Elsbeth Fassler
- John E. Hare
- Jennifer A. Herdt
- Martin Jean
- Willie James Jennings
- David Kelsey
- Andrew McGowan
- Teresa Morgan
- Sally M. Promey
- Bryan D. Spinks
- Harry S. Stout
- Kathryn Tanner
- Linn Tonstad
- Jacqueline Vayntrub
- Miroslav Volf
- Tisa Wenger
- Christian Wiman
- Adela Yarbro Collins

== See also ==
- General Theological Seminary, a separate New Haven institution now located in New York City
