= Gregory Sterling =

American religious scholar

Gregory E. Sterling
- Born: 1954 (age 71–72)
- Occupations: Religious scholar, academic and researcher
- Title: The Reverend Henry L. Slack Dean and Lillian Claus Professor of New Testament
- Awards: Presidential Award, University of Notre Dame; Alumnus of the Year, Graduate Theological Union

Academic background
- Education: Houston Baptist University; Pepperdine University; University of California; Graduate Theological Union; Yale University

Gregory E. Sterling is an American religious scholar, academic and researcher. He is the Reverend Henry L. Slack Dean and Lillian Claus Professor of New Testament at Yale Divinity School. He is a former dean of the Graduate School of University of Notre Dame, where he also served on the faculty for 23 years.

Sterling focuses on Hellenistic Judaism and has published over 100 scholarly papers on, among other subjects, the writings of Philo of Alexandria, Josephus, and Luke–Acts. He has focused on the ways Second Temple Jews and early Christians interacted with one another and with the Greco-Roman world. Sterling is the author of Historiography and Self-Definition: Josephos, Luke-Acts, and Apologetic Historiography, Armenian Paradigms and Coptic Paradigms: A Summary of Sahidic Coptic Morphology and the editor or co-editor of five other books.

Sterling is the General Editor of Philo of Alexandria Commentary Series by E. J. Brill and Co-Editor of the Studia Philonica Annual. He is a minister in the Churches of Christ.

On June 16, 2026, the Office of the Provost of Yale University announced that Sterling would conclude his term as dean at the end of the 2026-2027 academic year.

== Education ==
Sterling received his bachelor's degree in Christianity and history in 1978 and completed post-baccalaureate studies in classics in the following year at Houston Baptist University. He then received his master's degree in religion from Pepperdine University in 1980 and his master's degree in classics from the University of California in 1982. In 1990, he completed his Ph.D. in biblical studies with a specialization in the New Testament from the Graduate Theological Union.

== Career ==
Sterling joined the faculty at the University of Notre Dame in 1989 as a Visiting Assistant Professor and became a regular member of the faculty in 1990. He was promoted to Associate Professor in 1995 and to Professor of Theology in 2000. After teaching as Professor at University of Notre Dame for twenty-three years, Sterling left the University and was appointed by Yale University in 2012, as the Lillian Claus Professor of New Testament at Yale Divinity School and Professor of Religion in Department of Religious Studies.

At the University of Notre Dame, Sterling was appointed as Director of Graduate Studies for the Department of Theology, Associate Dean of the Faculty and Executive Associate Dean for the College of Arts and Letters, and Dean of the Graduate School in 1997, 2001, 2006 and 2008, respectively. In 2012, he was appointed as Reverend Henry L. Slack Dean of Yale Divinity School.

== Research ==
Sterling focuses on Hellenistic Judaism and has worked on New Testament and early Mediterranean and West-Asian religions. He has conducted research on the writings of Philo of Alexandria, Josephus, and Luke-Acts, and has focused on the interactions between Second Temple Jews and early Christians, as well as on the ways these groups related to the Greco-Roman world, especially in the areas of historiography and philosophy.

== Bibliography ==
=== Books ===
- Historiography and Self-Definition: Josephos, Luke-Acts, and Apologetic Historiography (1992) ISBN 978-9004095014
- editor, Hellenism in the Land of Israel (University of Notre Dame Press, 2001) ISBN 9780268030513
- Armenian Paradigms (Peeters, 2004) ISBN 978-9042913820
- Historiography and Self-Definition: Josephos, Luke-Acts, and Apologetic Historiography (2006) ISBN 978-1589831933
- Coptic Paradigms: A Summary of Sahidic Coptic Morphology (Peeters, 2008) ISBN 978-9042918726
- Shaping the Past to Define the Present: Luke-Acts and Apologetic Historiography (Eerdmans, 2023) ISBN 9780802848734

=== Selected articles ===
- "Wisdom among the Perfect: Creation Traditions in Alexandrian Judaism and Corinthian Christianity." Novum Testamentum 37 (1995): 355–84.
- "Platonizing Moses: Philo and Middle Platonism." The Studia Philonica Annual 5 (1993): 96-111.
- "'The Most Ancient and Reliable Record of the Past': The Jewish Appropriation of Hellenistic Historiography." pp. 231–43 in Companion to Greek & Roman Historiography .Edited by John Marincola. Oxford: Blackwell.
- "'The School of Sacred Laws': The Social Setting of Philo's Treatises." Vigiliae Christianae 53 (1999):148-64.
- "'Athletes of Virtue': An Analysis of the Summaries in Acts (2:41-47; 4:32-35; 5:12-16)." Journal of Biblical Literature 113 (1994): 679–96.
- "'A Law to Themselves': Limited Universalism in Philo and Paul." Zeitschrift für die neutestamentliche Wissenschaft und die Kunde der älteren Kirche 107 (2016): 30–47.
