= Lucius Bolles =

American pastor and theologian

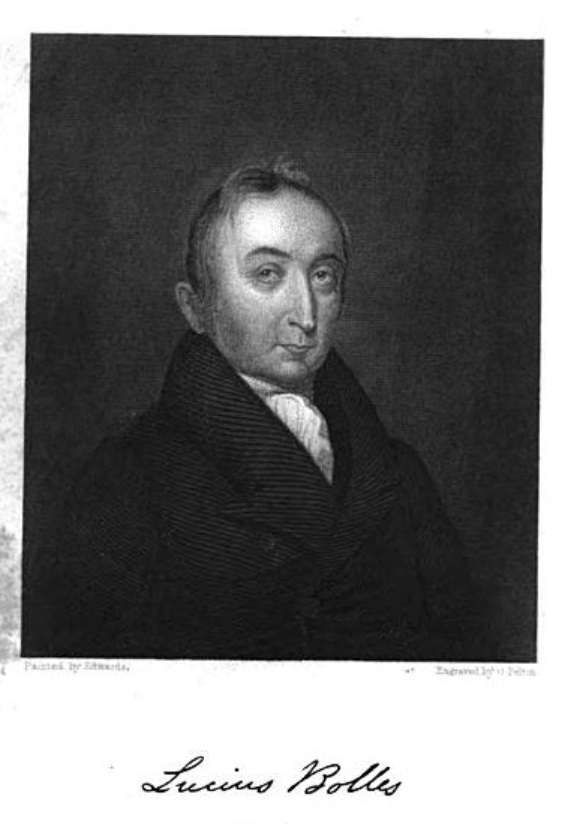
Bolles

Lucius Bolles, D.D., S.T.D. (September 25, 1779 – January 5, 1844), was a Baptist preacher and one of the founders of the Newton Theological Institution in Massachusetts.

He was the sixth child of Rev. David Bolles, was born at Ashford, Connecticut. He was an 1801 graduate of Brown University and a student of theology three years with Samuel Stillman, of Boston, Massachusetts. He served more than 22 years as pastor of the First Baptist Church of Salem, Massachusetts, and Corresponding Secretary of the Baptist Board of Foreign Missions fourteen years.

In 1812, Bolles was active in the formation of the Salem Bible and Translation Society. When American foreign missionary Adoniram Judson arrived in Burma after a change of views concerning baptism while aboard ship from the United States, he wrote to the Baptist church in Salem seeking financial support from Baptists, and Bolles organized a fundraising effort for him.

Bolles was a founding member of the American Society for the Promotion of Temperance, founded in 1826, alongside fellow Baptists Francis Wayland, Jonathan Going, and Heman Lincoln.

In 1830, Bolles was appointed president of the Northern Baptist Education Society, an organization founded to "aid, in acquiring a suitable education, such indigent, pious young men of the Baptist denomination, as shall give satisfactory evidence to the churches of which they are members, that they are called of God to the gospel ministry."

He married his cousin Lydia, daughter of Deacon John Bolles of Hartford, Connecticut, on September 8, 1805, and had four children: (1) Lucius Stillman Bolles, pastor of the Baptist Church at Lynn, Massachusetts; (2) John E. Bolles; (3) William C. Bolles; and (4) Lydia A. Bolles. He died in Boston in 1844.

== Publications ==
- Sermon at the Dedication of the First Baptist Meeting-house, Salem [Massachusetts], January 1, 1806 (Boston, 1806)
- Discourse before the Members of the Salem Female Charitable Society, September 27, 1810 (Salem, 1810)
- Sermon at Newburyport December 9, 1818, at the Ordination of the Rev. Hosea Wheeler to the Pastoral Care of the Baptist Church and Society in Newbury and Newburyport (Newburyport, 1819)
- The importance of the Scriptures to a teacher of religion : a discourse delivered in the meeting house of the Second Baptist Church in Boston, Sept. 18, 1822, before the Boston Baptist Association (Boston, 1822)
