= Linn Tonstad =

American theologian

- Born: 1978 (age 47–48)
- Other name: Linn Marie Tonstad

Academic background
- Education: Yale University

Academic work
- Discipline: Theology
- Sub-discipline: Systematic theology; Feminist theology; Queer theology
- School or tradition: Christian feminism; Queer theology
- Institutions: Yale University; American Academy of Religion

Linn Marie Tonstad (born 1978) is an American theologian who serves as Associate Professor of Theology, Religion, and Sexuality at Yale Divinity School.

== Biography ==
Tonstad joined the faculty at Yale Divinity School in 2012. She co-chairs the Theology and Religious Reflection unit of the American Academy of Religion and is on the steering committee of its Queer Studies in Religion unit.

== Publications ==
=== Books ===
- Queer Theology: Beyond Apologetics (Cascade, 2018)
- God and Difference: The Trinity, Sexuality, and the Transformation of Finitude (Routledge, 2016)
