= Daniel Sharp (clergyman) =

American pastor (1783–1853)

The Reverend Daniel Sharp D.D.
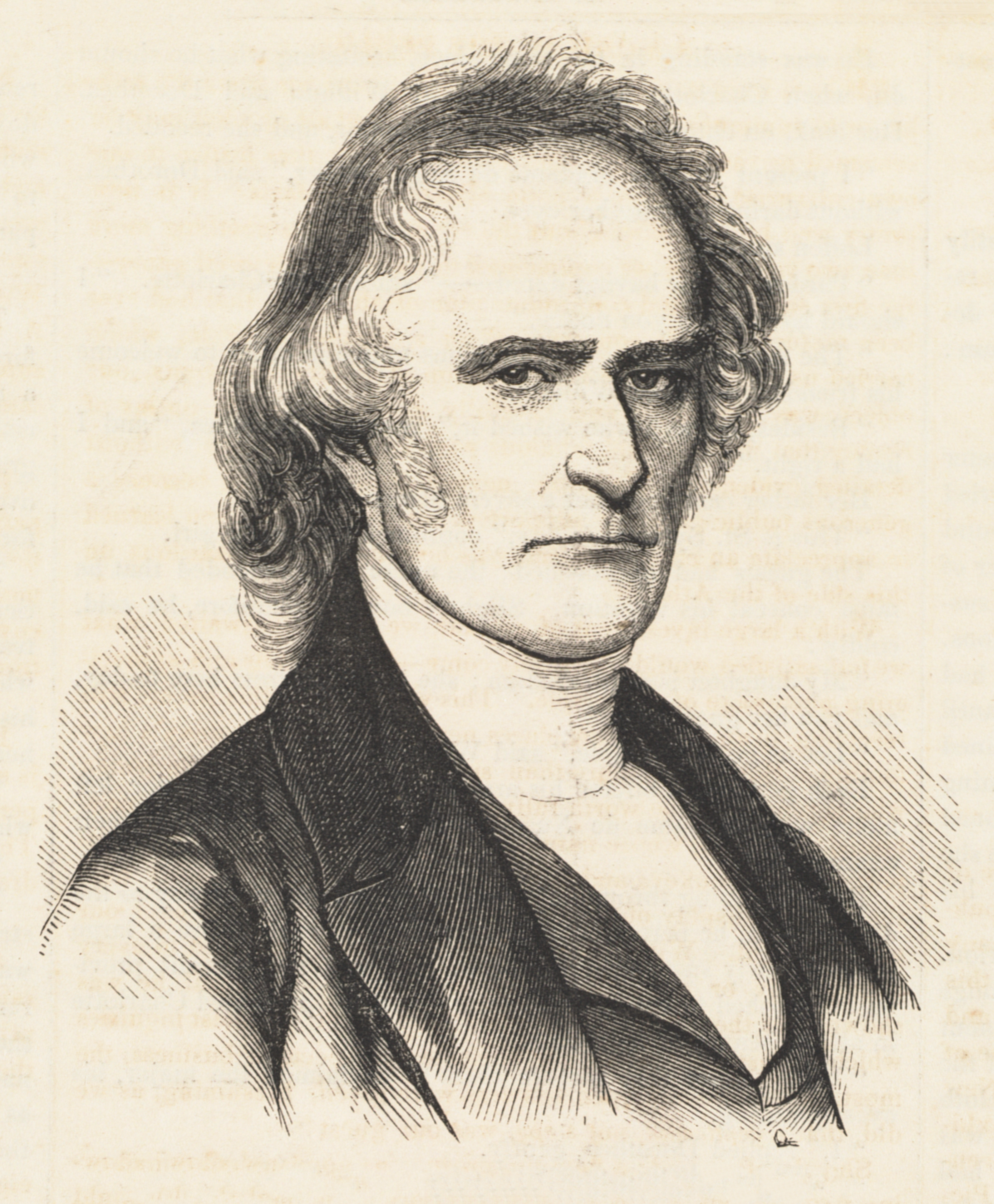
- Church: Baptist Church

Orders
- Ordination: May 1809

Personal details
- Born: December 25, 1783 Huddersfield, England
- Died: June 25, 1853 (aged 69) Baltimore, Maryland
- Buried: Mount Auburn Cemetery
- Denomination: Baptist
- Education: Brown University, A.M. (1811)

2nd President of the Conference of Baptist Ministers in Massachsuetts
- In office 1830–1852
- Preceded by: Joseph Grafton
- Succeeded by: Rev. Baron Alanson Stow

2nd Pastor of the Charles Street Baptist Church in Boston
- In office 1812–1853
- Preceded by: Rev. Caleb Blood
- Succeeded by: Rev. J. C. Stockbridge

Daniel Sharp D.D. (December 25, 1783 – June 25, 1853) was pastor of the Charles Street Baptist Church in Boston, Massachusetts, for more than forty years, from 1812 to about 1853. He was also one of the founders of the Newton Theological Institution.

== Biography ==
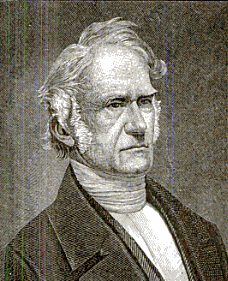
Portrait of Daniel Sharp, 19th century

Sharp was born December 25, 1783, in Huddersfield in West Riding of Yorkshire, England. His father was a Baptist pastor. Daniel was a member of the Congregational Church when, after some success in business, he emigrated to the United States in 1806 and soon joined the Baptists. He studied theology with Dr. William Staughton in Philadelphia beginning in March 1807 and was ordained pastor of the First Baptist Church in Newark, New Jersey, in 1809. Sharp received a Master of Arts from Brown University in 1811.

Sharp became pastor of Charles Street Baptist Church in Boston in 1812, having previously been invited to preach there in 1809 and 1811. He was secretary of the Baptist Society for the Propagation of the Gospel in India and Foreign Parts when it was formed in February 1813 and he prayers for the missions a regular practice for his congregation. Throughout his career he held administrative positions in the Massachusetts Baptist Missionary Society. He was a fellow of the corporation of Brown University and a member of the Board of Overseers of Harvard University.

As the head of a congregation and a leader of Baptist organizations, Sharp faced the dilemma of maintaining unity while providing moral guidance on the most contentious issues of his era, war and slavery. Preaching on April 2, 1846, on the subject of war and peace, he described the pastor's duty and used slavery to make his point:

Although a minister of the gospel may not, without stepping out of his place, discuss party questions; yet he may, and ought to ... seek to give a direction to public opinion. If need be, it should stir up the public mind in regard to long perpetuated evils....

In these respects, in all past times, the pulpit has done much to elevate the character and to improve the condition of Christian nations.... It has pleaded the cause of the poor slave; nay, it has done more than any other single instrumentality to break the fetters of the bondman, and bid the oppressed be free.

Sharp was a member and at times a vice president of the American Peace Society, which sought non-violent resolution to international conflicts. Though many Baptist pastors thought differently, he opposed the Mexican–American War and in June 1846, shortly after the U.S. declared war, he published a "Discourse on Peace" that called it "a war for southern territory, waged against justice, against humanity, and against the voice of God."

His health declined in 1852 and his service as pastor in Boston ended about 1853 when he traveled south seeking warmer weather. He died on June 23, 1853, at the home of Robert P. Brown in the village of Stoneleigh, in Baltimore, Maryland. The Boston Journal wrote in an obituary that "his views upon public affairs, and upon the great movements of the day ... were sound, practical and conservative, and fraught with benevolence."

Sharp received a Doctor of Divinity degree (D.D.) from Brown University in 1828 and from Harvard University in 1843. He was buried at Mount Auburn Cemetery in Cambridge, Massachusetts.
