= Liston Pope =

Liston Corlando Pope (6 September 1909 — 15 April 1974) was an American clergyman, author, theological educator, and dean of Yale University Divinity School from 1949 to 1962.

== Early life ==
Pope was born in Thomasville, North Carolina, the son of Robie Lester Pope and his wife, née Dora Vivian Younts. Robie Pope was a banker, a city councilman andmayor of Thomasville, and had served in the North Carolina House of Representatives. Liston Pope considered his father to be a "banker with a conscience" and an inspiration in his study of social problems from the Christian point of view.

== Academic and professional life ==
Pope graduated from Thomasville High School in 1925 and from Duke University, with a B.A., in 1929. He entered into the insurance business for fifteen months, then entered the School of Religion at Duke, obtaining a Bachelor of Divinity degree in 1932. He became the associate minister of the Wesley Memorial Methodist Church in High Point for three years, then became pastor at the Humphrey Street Congregational Church in New Haven. He was ordained in 1935 and served as pastor until 1938. He enrolled at the Graduate School of Yale University, obtaining a Ph.D. in 1940. His thesis, a study of the interrelationship of religion and economics was published in 1940 under the title Millhands and Preachers, won the John Addison Porter Prize, and was used as a text in social ethics courses in many universities.

He was active in the Congregational Christian Churches denomination and the ecumenical movement, particularly the World Council of Churches, and in organizations involved in theological education.

Pope became a lecturer at Yale in 1938, an assistant professor in 1939, and an associate professor in 1944. He became the Gilbert L. Stark Professor of Social Ethics in 1947, and was made dean of the Yale Divinity School in 1949, a position he served in until 1962. He retired from teaching in 1973, and donated his extensive library of books on social ethics to Yale, along with an endowment to be used for keeping the collection current; the collection is named the Dean Liston Pope Divinity School Library of Yale University.

== Personal life ==
Pope married Bennie Howell Purvis on 3 February 1934; they had three children together. She died on 13 November 1967. In 1972 Pope married Mrs. Gerd Synnove Thoreson, whom he had met while on sabbatical in Spain in 1971. The couple retired to Trondheim, Norway in 1973, where Pope died the following year. Pope was interred at Thomasville.

== Works ==
- Religious Proposals for World Order - 1941
- Mill Village Churches - 1941
- Millhands & Preachers: a study of Gastonia - 1942
- Labor's Relation to Church and Community (editor) - 1947
- New Directions for the Ministry - 1954
- Kingdom Beyond Caste - 1957
- Beginning of Knowledge; a sermon - 1960
