= George Park Fisher =

American theologian and historian

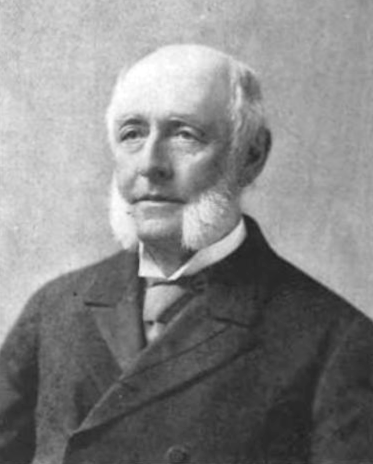
- Born: August 10, 1827; Wrentham, Massachusetts
- Died: December 20, 1909 (aged 82); Litchfield, Connecticut
- Burial place: Grove Street Cemetery
- Education: Brown University; Yale Divinity School; Andover Theological Seminary
- Occupations: Theologian, historian

George Park Fisher (August 10, 1827 – December 20, 1909) was an American theologian and historian who was noted as a teacher and a prolific writer.

== Biography ==
He was born in Wrentham, Massachusetts. He graduated from Brown University in 1847, and then studied theology at Yale Divinity School and the Andover Theological Seminary. He graduated from the latter institution in 1851. In 1853 he visited Germany, where he continued his theological studies.

Upon returning from Europe in 1854, he was appointed professor of divinity at Yale, and he was ordained as pastor of the College church. In 1861, he resigned these positions to become a professor of ecclesiastical history. In 1901, he became emeritus professor. Fisher was elected a member of the American Antiquarian Society in 1879. He was president of the American Historical Association in 1898.

He was a frequent contributor to The New Englander, of which quarterly he was an editor beginning in 1866.

Fisher died in Litchfield, Connecticut, on December 20, 1909, and was buried at Grove Street Cemetery in New Haven.

== Works ==
- Essays on the Supernatural Origin of Christianity, with special reference to the Theories of Renan, Strauss, and the Tübingen School (1865; enlarged ed. 1871)
- Life of Benjamin Silliman, M.D., LL.D., Late Professor of Chemistry, Mineralogy, and Geology in Yale College (2 vols., 1866)
- History of the Reformation, based on an 1871 course of lectures at the Lowell Institute, Boston, on the Protestant Reformation (1873)
- The Beginnings of Christianity (1877)
- Faith and Rationalism (1879)
- The Christian Religion (1882)
- The Grounds of Theistic and Christian Belief (1883)
- The Christian Religion (1886)
- Manual of Christian Evidences (1890)
- Brief History of the Nation (1890)
- Colonial History of the United States (1892)
- Manual of Natural Theology (1893)
- History of the Christian Church (1893)
- History of Christian Doctrine (1896)
- Outline of Universal History (1904)
