= Andover Newton Seminary at Yale Divinity School =

American seminary program

- Former names: Andover Theological Seminary (1807–1965); Newton Theological Institution (1825–1965); Andover Newton Theological School (1965–2018)
- Type: Private
- Established: 2017
- Location: 409 Prospect St, New Haven, Connecticut, USA
- Campus: Urban
- Website: andovernewton.yale.edu

Andover Newton Seminary at Yale Divinity School is an American seminary program founded in 2017 within Yale Divinity School and located in New Haven, Connecticut. It is the successor institution of Andover Newton Theological School (ANTS), the oldest graduate seminary in the United States and the nation's first graduate institution of any kind.

In November 2015, ANTS, affiliated with the American Baptist Churches USA and the United Church of Christ, announced that it would sell its campus in Newton, Massachusetts and relocate, after a presence of 190 years on that site. In July 2017, ANTS and Yale Divinity School completed a formal affiliation to create Andover Newton Seminary within the Divinity School.

== History ==
=== Historic Primacy in American Theological Education (1807–2017) ===
The institutional roots of Andover Newton Seminary reside in two foundational American Protestant academies:

1. Andover Theological Seminary (founded in Andover, Massachusetts, in 1807) was chartered as the first independent graduate institution in the United States. Established by Congregationalists seeking a rigorous post-baccalaureate curriculum, Andover created the standardized three-year theological curriculum that became the architectural template for American graduate theological education.
2. Newton Theological Institution (founded in Newton Centre, Massachusetts, in 1825) was established as the first graduate theological seminary for the Baptist tradition in the United States, emphasizing learned ministry, biblical scholarship, and missionary vocation.

The two seminaries formed an experimental academic partnership in 1931, consolidating operations on Newton Centre’s historic 80-acre hilltop campus ("the Hill") before formally merging in 1965 to create Andover Newton Theological School.

Throughout the nineteenth and twentieth centuries, the institution served as a primary incubator for modern American clerical practice. It pioneered accredited Field Education (the precursor to modern clinical pastoral education and contextual ministry), led progressive social gospel engagements, and took early leadership roles in the abolitionist movement. Its faculty had historically ranked among the most distinguished in theological education, and its alumni and alumnae have included important abolitionists, educators, clergy, and theologians; three presidents of Brown University; the founding presidents of Wabash College, Grinnell College, and the Union Theological Seminary in New York City; one of the most important presidents of Dartmouth College; and major figures in many areas of American life and culture.

=== Andover Newton at Yale (2017–Present) ===
In the early twenty-first century, amid widespread economic pressures across freestanding theological seminaries, Andover Newton’s governing board undertook a comprehensive institutional assessment. In 2015, President Martin Copenhaver and the Board of Trustees announced a long-term strategic plan to transition away from the high overhead of maintaining a physical campus in suburban Newton, opting to affiliate with an internationally recognized research university.

In May 2016, ANTS president Martin Copenhaver announced that Andover Newton would begin a process of formal affiliation with Yale Divinity School over the following two years. In the 2016–17 academic year, a cohort of faculty relocated to New Haven, Connecticut, teaching students and launching pilot initiatives focused on congregational ministry education, while Andover Newton continued to operate in Massachusetts.

The aim of negotiations was a permanent affiliation (beginning in the 2017–18 academic year), resulting in a smaller Andover Newton functioning as a unit within Yale Divinity School, similar to the current arrangement with Berkeley Divinity School. Copenhaver projected that the sale of the Newton, Massachusetts campus would pay off debt and create an endowment for the institution at Yale. On June 29, 2017, the sale of the Andover Newton campus was finalized, and on July 20, 2017, the boards of Andover Newton and Yale Divinity School signed an agreement to formalize their affiliation.

== Academic Life, Governance, and Endowed Mission ==
=== Curriculum and Specialized Formation ===
Within the Sterling Divinity Quadrangle, Andover Newton Seminary stewarded its ancestral commitment to locally adapted, congregational leadership. While all students share Yale’s standard theological coursework, Andover Newton scholars engage in specialized ministerial cohorts, targeted colloquia on church leadership, clinical pastoral care, and denominational polity.

=== The seminary places particular emphasis on ===
1. Emmaus Gathering: Intentional ministerial gatherings designed to develop collaborative pastoral competencies and collegial resilience.
2. Pioneering Clinical & Contextual Education: Continuing Andover Newton's historic legacy as the originator of Field Education by deploying candidates into urban churches, non-profit agencies, healthcare settings, and community organizations across Greater New Haven and Southern New England.
3. Emmaus Encounter Seminars: Advanced seminars and travel cohorts that integrate practical theology, missiology, and multi-faith engagement into cross-border relationship building.

=== Governance and Executive Leadership ===
Andover Newton maintains an independent Advisory Council and distinct foundation board that oversees its restricted endowment funds, monitors institutional fidelity to its founding Congregational and Baptist heritage, and collaborates with the Dean of Yale Divinity School.

1. Dean of the Seminary: The executive leadership of Andover Newton is held by the Dean, a post occupied since its establishment at Yale by the Rev. Dr. Sarah B. Drummond, who previously served as Dean of the Faculty in Massachusetts.
2. Community Development and Spiritual Formation: JaQuan Beachem serves as Associate Dean of Community Development and Spiritual Formation, directing cohort life, ministerial identity, and vocational discernment.
3. Ecumenical Bridge-Building: Embedded within Yale’s broader quadrangle, Andover Newton functions as a central axis for prophetic renewal, connecting regional parish ministry in Connecticut with global scholarly resources.
