= Newton Theological Institution =

Baptist seminary in Massachusetts, US

Newton Theological Institution was a Baptist theological seminary founded on November 28, 1825, in Newton Centre, Massachusetts, United States.

The Institution was proposed in 1814, as a way to educate new Baptist preachers to serve in New England; this became the first Baptist seminary in the United States. Architect Alexander Rice Esty designed the seminary building, while local philanthropist Gardner Colby donated the funds for the main hall and a chapel on the site.

Newton adopted the graduate education model and three-year curriculum pioneered by Andover Theological Seminary, with which it shared a theological tradition of evangelistic zeal. Students from the two institutions were at the forefront of the modern missionary movement.

The first professors were Reverend Irah Chase and Henry Ripley.

== Merger ==
Newton shared its campus with Andover from 1931 to 1965, when the schools formally merged to form Andover Newton Theological School. By virtue of Andover's prior affiliation with Harvard University, students of Andover Newton are allowed to take classes in any of Harvard's ten graduate schools.

In 2016 Andover Newton Theological School announced that it would be leaving the Newton Centre campus in June 2017 and that most courses would thereafter be taught at Yale Divinity School. In 2026, the seminary programme is known as the Andover Newton Seminary at Yale Divinity School.
