= Yale Institute of Sacred Music =

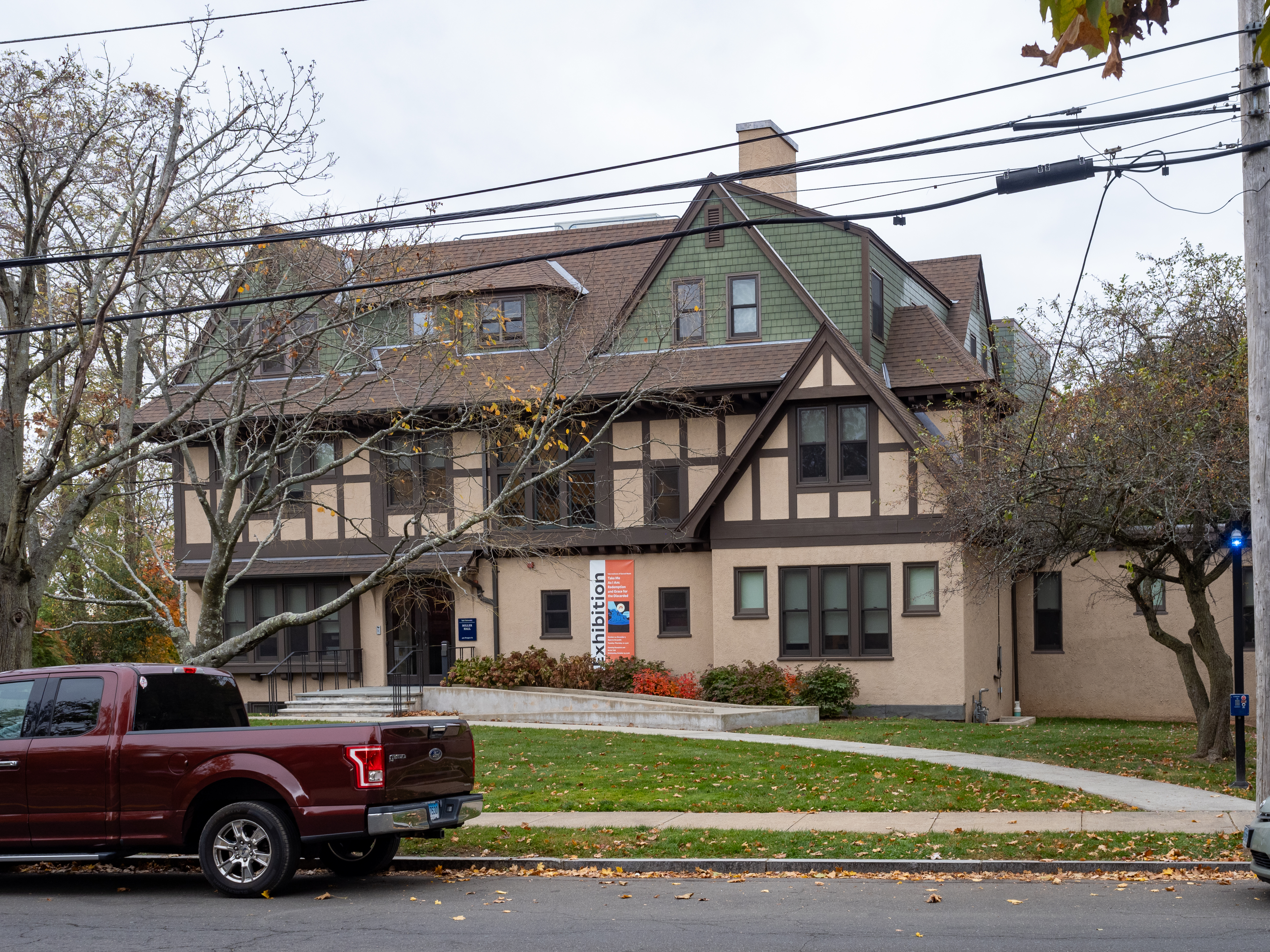

The Yale Institute of Sacred Music (ISM) is a joint venture between the Yale School of Music and Yale Divinity School focused on the study of music, visual arts, literature, liturgy, and other forms of the arts.

Master of Music (M.M.), Master of Musical Arts (M.M.A.), and Doctor of Musical Arts (D.MA.) students in the Yale School of Music pursue concentrations at the ISM in

- organ
- voice
- choral conducting
- performance
- composition
- church music studies

Master of Arts in Religion (M.A.R.) students at Yale Divinity School pursue concentrations at the ISM in

- Liturgical Studies
- Religion and Music
- Religion and Literature
- Religion and the Arts

Students in the M.Div. and S.T.M. programs at Yale Divinity School can also pursue study at the ISM.

The Institute traces its roots to the School of Sacred Music founded at Union Theological Seminary in New York City. The seminary's department of church music was brought to Yale in 1972, entering into partnership with the Yale School of Music and the Yale Divinity School. The institute offers programs in organ performance, choral conducting, liturgical studies, voice, and religion and the arts.
