= Lester Ruth =

- Born: October 12, 1959 (age 67)
- Education: University of Notre Dame (Ph.D.) University of Notre Dame (MA) Emory University (Th.M.) Asbury Theological Seminary (M.Div) Stephen F. Austin State University (BBA)
- Occupation: Research Professor of Christian Worship
- Years active: 1994-present
- Organization: Duke Divinity School
- Known for: Historian of Christian worship with particular interests in the early Church and the eighteenth century to the present.
- Website: https://divinity.duke.edu/faculty/lester-ruth

Lester Ruth is Research Professor of Christian Worship at Duke Divinity School and President of the North American Academy of Liturgy. His research concentrates on the history of liturgy and worship, with particular attention on the early Church and the eighteenth century to the present. Historian Karen B. Westerfield Tucker has described Ruth's book A Little Heaven Below as "essential for persons interested in early American religious history, and for Methodists who not only seek to understand their past, but who also strive to understand the complexities of the present."

Dr. Ruth's recent work has focused on band-based contemporary praise and worship. He believes that appreciation for the worship of other Christian traditions (past and present), whether Protestant, Roman Catholic, or Eastern Orthodox, can enrich the Church today.

Dr. Ruth is an Elder in the Texas Annual Conference of the United Methodist Church and former president of the Charles Wesley Society. He was vice president of the North American Academy of Liturgy, the primary scholarly organization for the study of Christian worship in the U.S. and Canada in January 2025 and became president in January 2026. His works have been translated into Korean, Chinese, Indonesian, and Ukrainian.

== Selected Bibliography of Authored & Edited Books ==
- How Worship Became Music: A Historical Sourcebook. 1st ed. Edited by Jonathan Ottaway, Adam Perez, and Lester Ruth. Abingdon Press, 2026.
- A History of Contemporary Praise and Worship : Understanding the Ideas That Reshaped the Protestant Church. 1st ed. Baker Academic, 2021.
- Essays on the History of Contemporary Praise and Worship. Pickwick Publications, 2020.
- Flow: The Ancient Way to Do Contemporary Worship. 1st ed. Edited by Lester Ruth. Abingdon Press, 2020.
- Leaning on the Word: Worship with Argentine Baptists in the Mid-Twentieth Century. Edited by Lester Ruth. William B. Eerdmans Publishing Company, 2017.
- Lovin’ on Jesus : A Concise History of Contemporary Worship. 1st ed. Abingdon Press, 2017.
- Worshiping with the Anaheim Vineyard : The Emergence of Contemporary Worship. Eerdmans, 2017
- Longing for Jesus: Worship at a Black Holiness Church in Mississippi, 1895-1913. Edited by Lester Ruth. William B. Eerdmans Publishing Company, 2013..
- Accompanying the Journey: A Handbook for Sponsors. Edited by Lester Ruth. Wipf and Stock Publishers, 2012.
- Walking Where Jesus Walked : Worship in Fourth-Century Jerusalem. William B. Eerdmans, 2010.
- Creative Preaching on the Sacraments. Edited by Craig Alan Satterlee and Lester Ruth. Discipleship Resources, 2001.
- A Little Heaven below: Worship at Early Methodist Quarterly Meetings. Edited by Lester Ruth. Kingswood Books, 2000.
