= Tippet =

Pendant streamer hanging from the sleeve of a cotehardie

Meriwether Lewis in 1807 wearing a tippet presented to him by Sacagawea's brother, Cameahwait (c. 1805)

A tippet is a piece of clothing worn over the shoulders in the shape of a scarf, cape, or wrap.

Tippets evolved in the fourteenth century from long sleeves and typically had one end hanging down to the knees. A tippet (or tappit) could also be the long, narrow, streamer-like strips of fabric - attached with an armband just above the elbow - that hung gracefully to the knee or even to the ground.

In later fashion, a tippet is often any scarf-like wrap, usually made of fur, such as the sixteenth-century zibellino or the fur-lined capelets worn in the mid-18th century.

== Elite costume ==
In 16th-century England, King Edward VI's robes included a tippet of crimson velvet embroidered with half moons of silver. Elizabeth I owned a fur "typett" made of three sable skins.

== Seventeenth-century Europe ==
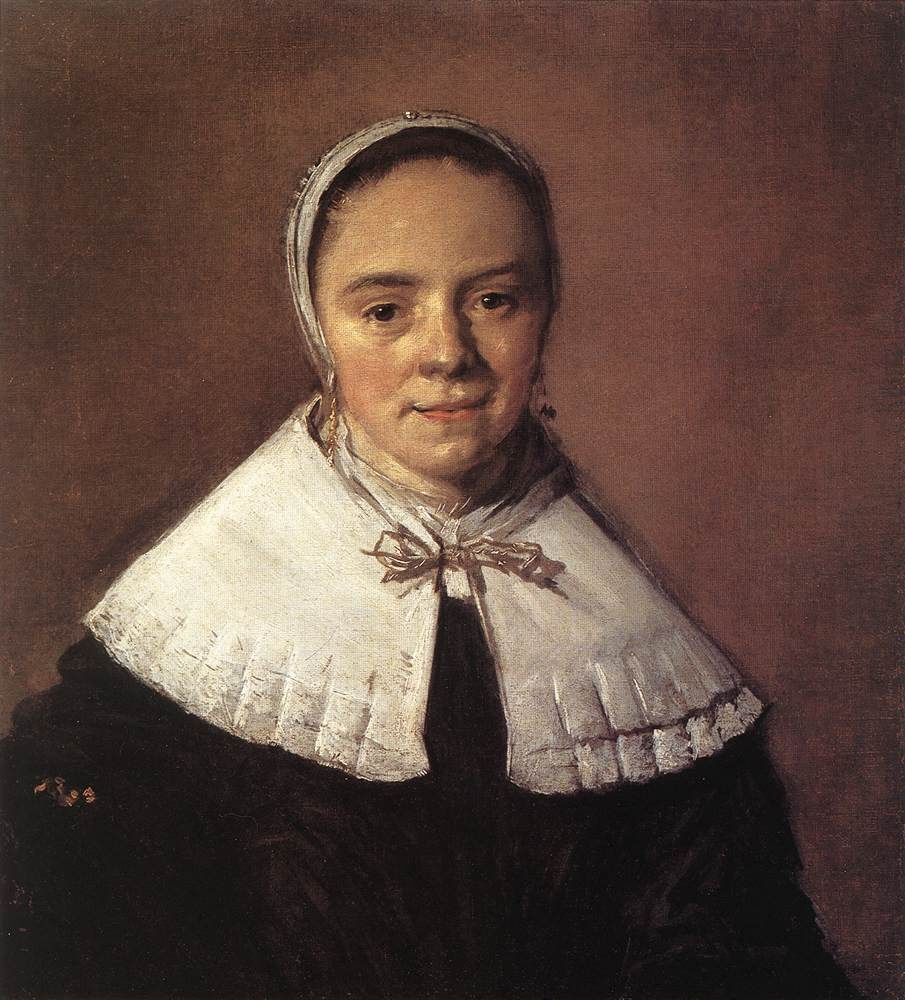
Portrait of a Young Woman by Frans Hals, about 1655–1660. The sitter wears a white tippet. Ferens Art Gallery, Hull, England

Instead of a more elaborate collar or ruff, some middle-cass women in, for instance, Golden-Age Holland, wore a tippet over the shoulders. An example can be seen in the Portrait of a Young Woman by Frans Hals at the Ferens Art Gallery, Hull.

== Ecclesiastical use ==
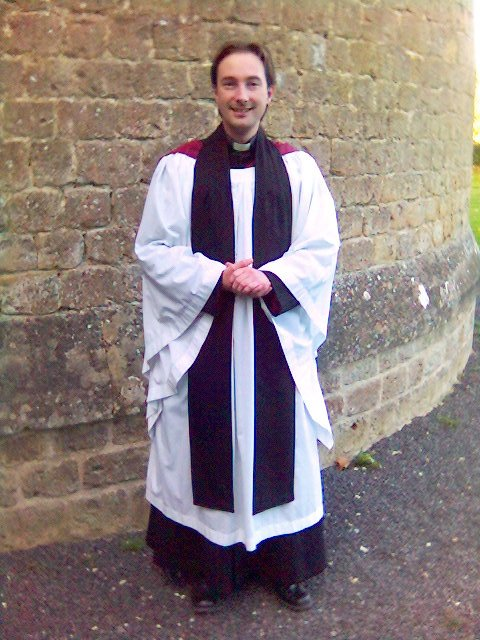
Anglican priest wearing a black tippet.

=== Anglican ===
The ceremonial scarf often worn by Anglican priests, deacons, and lay readers is called a tippet, also known as a "preaching scarf." It is a long piece of fabric, usually corded silk grosgrain or ottoman, but can also be of wool or polyester, around 110" long, 6" wide (though it varies between maker), and is pleated narrower at the portion where it is worn around the neck. Sometimes, the ends are pinked.

It is worn with choir dress and hangs straight down at the front. Ordained clergy (bishops, priests and deacons) wear a black tippet. In the last century or so variations have arisen to accommodate forms of lay leadership. Authorized readers (known in some dioceses as licensed lay ministers) sometimes wear a blue one. A red tippet is also worn in some Anglican dioceses by commissioned lay workers. Commissioned evangelists of the Church Army are presented with a cherry red type tippet of the capelet or collar shape rather than a scarf, although some replace this with a scarf form of the tippet, retaining the distinctive red colour.

Tippets are often worn as part of choir dress for the Daily Offices of Morning Prayer and Evening Prayer, as required in Canon B8 of the Church of England (in the Canon, the word "scarf" is used). Stricter low church clergy may wear the tippet, and not a coloured stole, as part of choir dress during any church service, including for the Holy Communion. This follows practice that was normalized from the Reformation until the late 19th century. By contrast, some Anglo-Catholics tend not to wear the tippet, preferring the choir habit of Roman Catholic clergy.

Clergy who are entitled to wear medals, orders, or awards sometimes fix them to the upper left side of the tippet on suitable occasions (such as Remembrance Sunday in the Church of England). Sometimes the end of the tippet is embroidered with the coat of arms of an ecclesiastical institution with which the cleric is affiliated. It is common for the Canons of Cathedral churches to have the coat of arms of their cathedral embroidered on one or both sides of the tippet, commonly on the breast rather than the end, as a sign of office.

The tippet is not the stole, which although often worn like a scarf, is a Eucharistic vestment, usually made of richer material, and varying according to the liturgical colour of the day.

=== Other denominations ===
In the British Army, all serving chaplains are issued with a tippet to be worn directly over battledress when ministering in conflict zones. Anglican chaplains wear the standard black tippet, whilst Roman Catholic chaplains are distinguished by a violet coloured tippet.

Some Lutherans also use the tippet. Members of the Lutheran Society of the Holy Trinity wear a black tippet embroidered with the Society's seal when presiding at the daily office.

The black preaching scarf (or rarely blue, grey, or green) is also worn by some Scottish Presbyterian ministers and other non-conformist clergy.

=== Bachelors and Doctors of Divinity ===
Those who hold the degrees of BD, MTh, and/or DD may usually wear the tippet over their academic robes (at Oxford University, it is prescribed as part of the DD academic full dress, whilst for others it is optional). Usually, the gown or robe of these degrees will have a cord and button on the yoke in order to facilitate the tippet being secured at the back when worn. The tippet is worn lying over the hood.

== Judicial use ==
Some judges and justices within the Commonwealth realms wear a black tippet (of the same form as those of ecclesiasts), typically with their full dress scarlet winter robes. In such cases, the tippet is worn over the robe but under the hood.

== British military nurses ==
A different and non-religious sort of tippet, a shoulder-length cape, has been part of the uniform of British military nurses or of nursing uniforms in Commonwealth countries. These are often decorated with piping and may have badges or insignia indicating the wearer's rank.

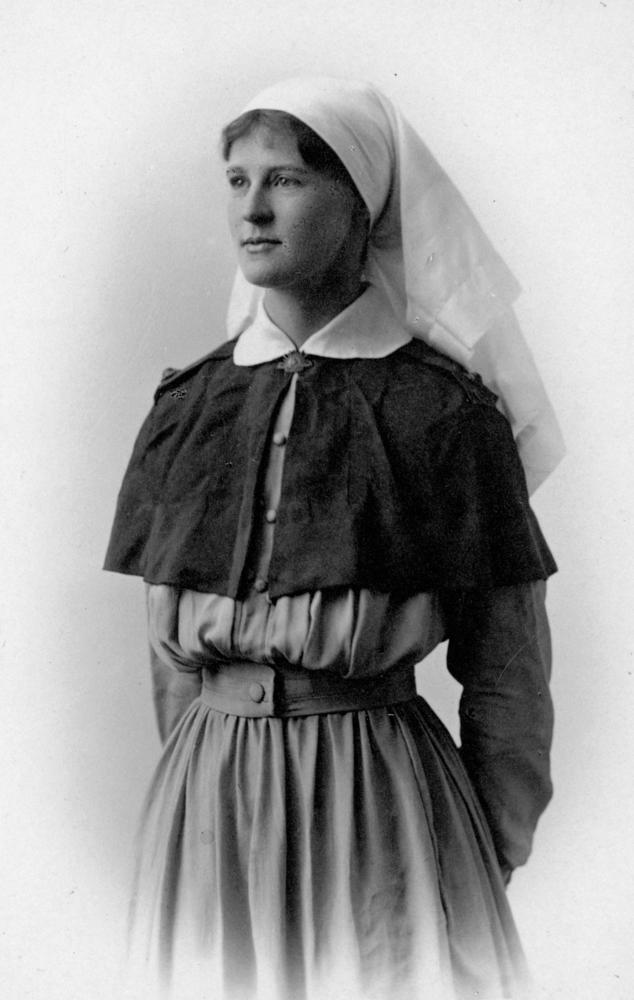
WWI Australian Nurse Ella McLean, shown wearing tippet

== Evolution of the tippet ==
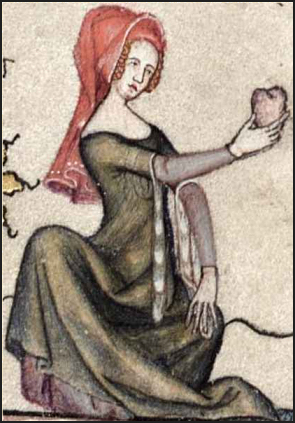
Fourteenth century fur-lined tippet or hanging sleeve

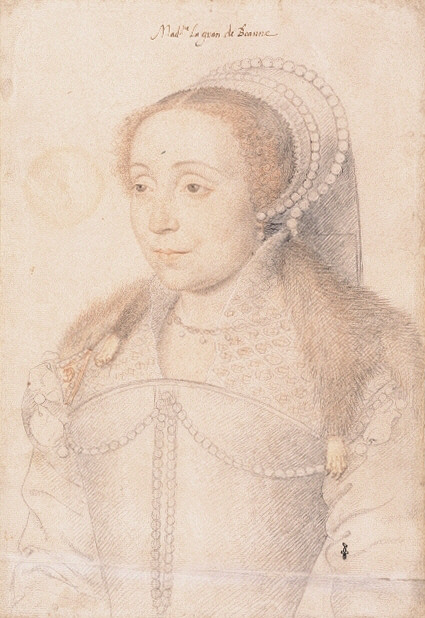
Sixteenth century zibellino or fur tippet

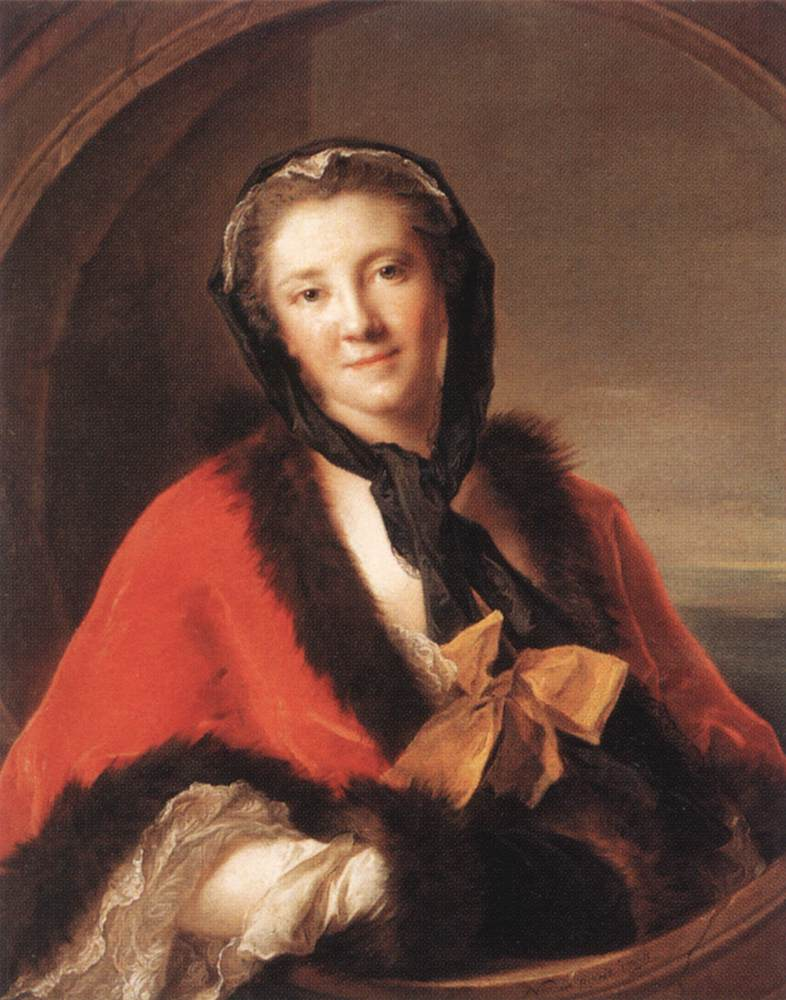
Eighteenth century fur-lined tippet or capelet
