= The Oxford Guide to the Book of Common Prayer: A Worldwide Survey =

2006 nonfiction book on Christian liturgy

- Editors: Charles Hefling and Cynthia Shattuck
- Language: English
- Subject: Book of Common Prayer; Protestant liturgy Liturgical books
- Publisher: Oxford University Press
- Publication date: 2006
- Publication place: United States
- Media type: Print (hardback, paperback)
- Pages: xvi + 614
- ISBN: 0-19-529756-3

The Oxford Guide to the Book of Common Prayer: A Worldwide Survey is a nonfiction reference work edited by Charles Hefling and Cynthia Shattuck which was published by Oxford University Press in 2006. The volume covered the development of the Book of Common Prayer as the dominant liturgical book of Anglicanism from the prayer book's origins in 16th-century England through to its global use and influence in the modern era, including coverage of the prayer book's influence on non-Anglican Christians. It was composed by 58 authors and was divided into more than 70 essays.

Several liturgists and historians—including Donald Gray, Alec Ryrie, and Frank Senn—positively reviewed the book. Judith Maltby's contributions drew particular praise from both Senn and Ryrie, with the latter quipping that The Oxford Guide to the Book of Common Prayer made him suspect "that there is such a thing as 'Anglicanism' after all".

== Background ==
Since Thomas Cranmer introduced the first Book of Common Prayer in 1549, there have been many editions of the Book of Common Prayer published in more than 200 languages. The successive editions of the Church of England's prayer books iterated on its contents, which by the 1662 prayer book featured the Holy Communion office, Daily Office, lectionaries, rites for confirmation, several forms of baptism, calendar of feasts and fasts, ordinal, psalter, and Thirty-nine Articles. As Anglicanism grew beyond England, further editions appeared to suit the needs of certain localities and groups. The editors of The Oxford Guide to the Book of Common Prayer held that this diversity of prayer books defied suggestions of "uniformity" but instead reflected varying degrees of "family resemblance".

== Contents ==
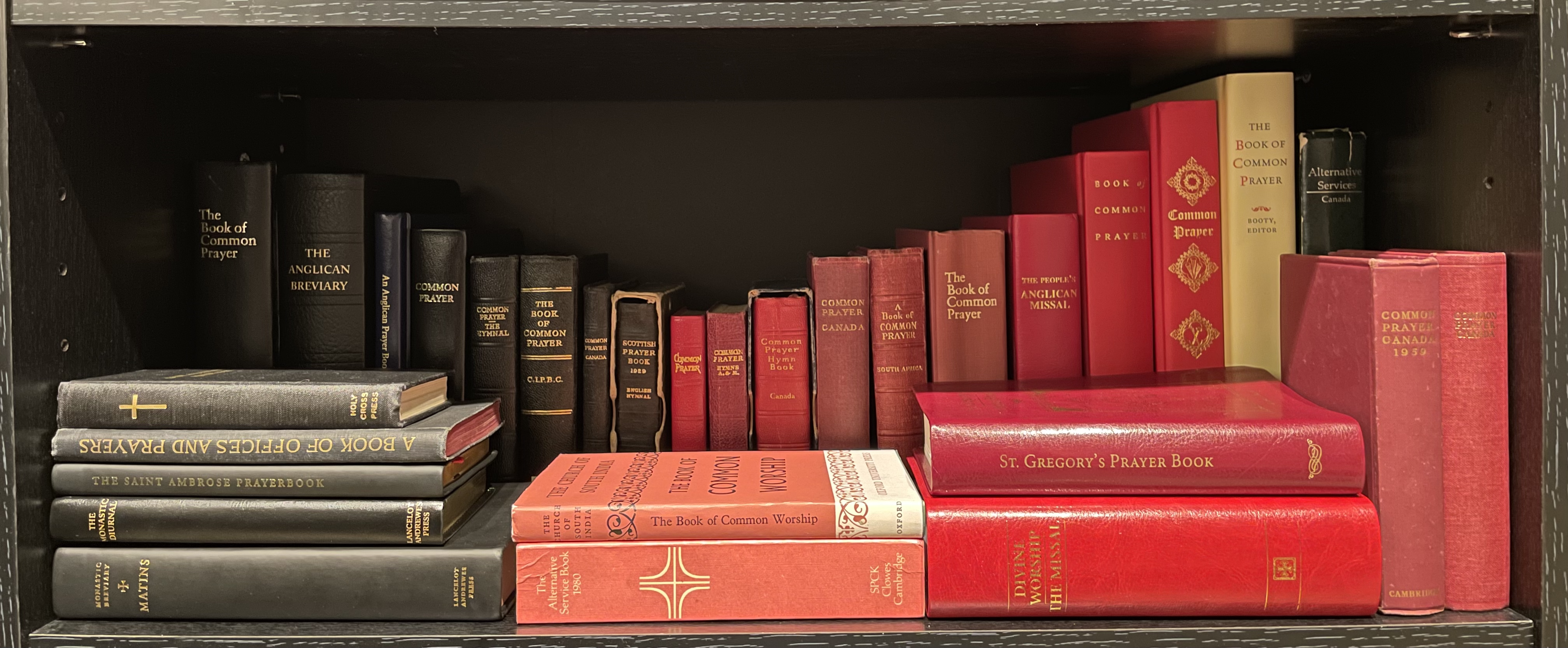
A collection of various editions of the Book of Common Prayer, derivatives, and associated liturgical texts

A reference work, The Oxford Guide to the Book of Common Prayer was authored by 58 writers and was divided into over 70 essays, with each essay focussed on an aspect of the Book of Common Prayer and the "whole 'Prayer Book family'". The "very substantial" book was printed with "narrow margins" and "eye-wateringly small print". The authorship generally favored Anglicans, particularly American Episcopalians; the work came out of Oxford University Press's office in New York.

The book is broken into seven parts:

1. The origin and history of the Book of Common Prayer in 16th- and 17th-century England
2. The prayer book in society and culture
3. The prayer book beyond England
4. The 20th-century prayer books
5. The present-day prayer books
6. Worship in the prayer books and possible future revisions
7. The future of the prayer book

The contributors and their essays "underscore[d that] 'Anglicans do their theology in the context of worship'". Rowan Williams, the Archbishop of Canterbury, wrote the foreword. In the introduction, editor Charles Hefling (Note: Hefling authored The Book of Common Prayer: A Guide, which was published by Oxford University Press in 2021. The 2021 book's coverage is divided into three sections on the liturgical contents of the prayer book, its development and editions, and the technical and musical considerations associated with the text.) argued that the Anglican prayer books and their ecumenical relatives were "not cast from the same mould, but they are cut from the same cloth". A chapter by Kenneth Stevenson provided context regarding Christian practice in medieval England. Gordon Jeanes's essay addressed Thomas Cranmer's contact with continental reformers during the preparation of the first and second prayer books. The period between Elizabeth I and Charles II was covered by Bryan D. Spinks. The prayer book's influence on John Wesley and Methodism was the subject of an essay by Karen B. Westerfield Tucker. Carl Scovel wrote on the Unitarian revisions of the Book of Common Prayer. There were 31 essays addressing the prayer book in modern global usage.

== Critical reception ==
In a 2006 review for Publishers Weekly, Karl Tobien appraised The Oxford Guide to the Book of Common Prayer as "sure to become the definitive source of studies of the Book of Common Prayer". Reflecting on the concluding essays regarding the future of Christian worship, which Tobien felt were sometimes done "a tad whimsically", he mused of a future where "Sunday worshippers will read the liturgy from Palm Pilots [sic] or BlackBerry devices". C. Brian Smith, for a 2006 review in Library Journal, found that the book's elements–including sidebars and illustrations–were enhancements. He further suggested that "librarians will have difficulty deciding whether to place this in the circulating or reference collections–or perhaps both".

Church of England priest and Alcuin Club chairman Donald Gray, writing in 2007 for Church Times, felt that the Oxford guide did not displace Lowther Clarke's Liturgy and Worship. While appreciative of portions of some liturgical texts being included alongside the text, Gray referred readers to other works by Bernard Wigan and Colin Buchanan if they wished to study the specific texts of Anglican rites. Despite this, Gray found the Oxford guide to be "a valuable book" that demonstrated the diversity of Anglican prayer book worship. He noted that volume of American scholarship that made up the book reflected what he deemed a lack of liturgical expertise in the contemporary Church of England.

Historian of Protestantism Alec Ryrie, in his 2010 review published in Reformation, said that the volume's subject might leave historians of the Reformation–particularly the English Reformation–disappointed and warned "the subtitle is serious" and that the scope of the text was the global, with coverage running into present events. However, he praised Judith Maltby's essay on the prayer book's "social use". Ryrie described this chapter as containing an "updated, engaging" restatement of an argument contained within Maltby's 1998 Prayer Book and People in Elizabethan and Early Stuart England, which contended that the prayer book "was woven into English Protestant life". Overall, Ryrie felt the book was an "exemplary, carefully-edited, beautifully-illustrated volume which will be of limited use to most readers of this journal" and made him suspect "that there is such a thing as 'Anglicanism' after all".

Louis Weil, an American Episcopalian involved in the production of the 1979 Book of Common Prayer, praised the volume as a "unprecedented survey" of the prayer book, particularly applauding James F. White's essay on the interplay between liturgy and church architecture. Despite the praise, Weil criticized the lack of essays covering "living images of how exactly the rites were celebrated" and noted a typographical error inaccurately describing the Prayer of Humble Access's placement within the 1789 American prayer book.

Frank Senn, a liturgist and pastor, wrote a review in Anglican Theological Review that found that the book's 58 authors included "a veritable who's who among Anglican liturgical scholars, as well as scholars in other traditions". The chapters, according to Senn, were more stylistically similar than those found in encyclopedic articles. While he considered Stevenson's chapter on pre-Reformation English worship "a needed background", Senn said that the coverage of liturgical book evolution should have extended further back to the period of the late 6th-century figure Augustine of Canterbury.

Some portions of the book drew particular praise. Gordon Maitland, the national chairman of the Prayer Book Society of Canada, affirmed John Baldovin's essay on the 20th-century Liturgical Movement as "a useful summary". In their reviews, Tobien and Smith were appreciative of essays providing coverage of Asian and African prayer books. Senn found that the work by Maltby and Jeremy Gregory that spanned the period from the 16th to the 19th century provided "a picture of participation in Prayer Book worship in Anglican parishes", with Senn positively comparing their work to Eamon Duffy's The Stripping of the Altars. Alongside William L. Sach's coverage of British colonial prayer book worship, Senn felt these essays were "nearly worth the price of the book".
