= Karen B. Westerfield Tucker =

American historian and Methodist minister

Karen B. Westerfield Tucker (born 1954) is an American historian and United Methodist minister. She has authored several histories of Christian liturgy, some of which were published in The Oxford Guide to the Book of Common Prayer and The Oxford History of Christian Worship; she also edited the latter volume with Geoffrey Wainwright. Westerfield Tucker was the president of the ecumenical liturgiological organization Societas Liturgica and was the editor-in-chief of its journal, Studia Liturgica. She is the Professor of Worship at the Boston University School of Theology.

== Career ==
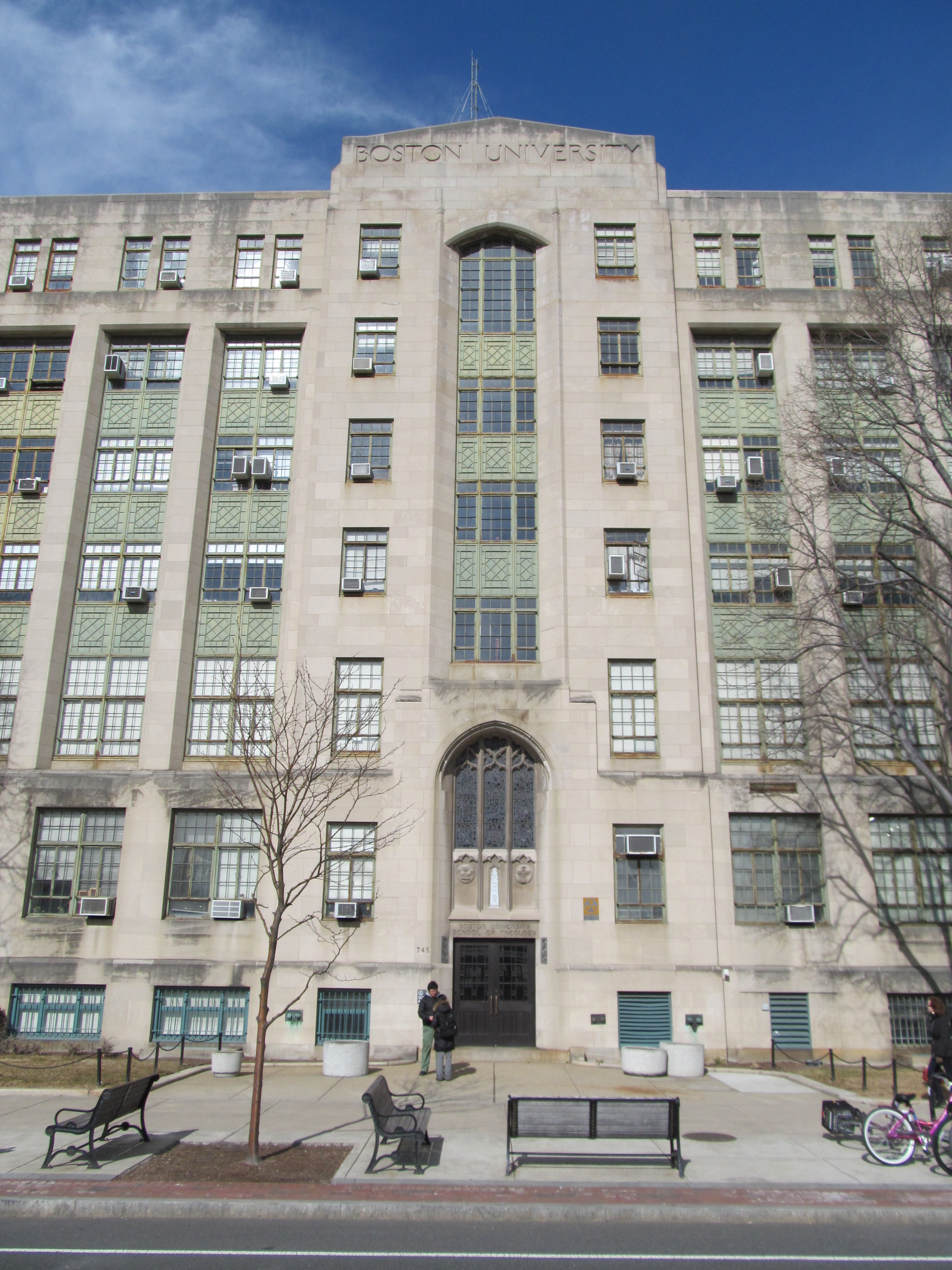
The Boston University School of Theology, where Westerfield Tucker has been on the faculty since 2004

Westerfield Tucker received a BA from Emory & Henry College in 1976, MDiv from Duke Divinity School, and both an MA in liturgical history and a PhD in liturgical studies from the University of Notre Dame. Emory & Henry College honored her with the college's Distinguished Achievement Award for her contributions to the college and the region. She was ordained as a minister in the United Methodist Church, pastorally assigned to the Illinois Great Rivers Conference, where she is an elder.

She served as the president of the Societas Liturgica, an ecumenical liturgiological organization. She was also the editor-in-chief of the society's journal, Studia Liturgica, for nine years. She is also a life member of the Hymn Society in the United States and Canada; much of Westerfield Tucker's scholarship has focused on the role and development of hymnals. She joined the Joint International Commission for Theological Dialogue, a collaboration between the World Methodist Council and the Pontifical Council for Promoting Christian Unity, in 2006. As the Methodist co-secretary of this group, she organized the body's 2018 meeting in Hong Kong. Westerfield Tucker became a member of the faculty at the Boston University School of Theology in 2004 and is its Professor of Worship. She was part of the Duke University faculty for 15 years previously.

In 2006, The Oxford History of Christian Worship was published by Oxford University Press. Westerfield Tucker and Geoffrey Wainwright edited the book which compiled contributions on Christian worship and liturgy from 38 international scholars. She also wrote the chapter "Women in Worship" for the book. Also published in 2006 by Oxford University Press, The Oxford Guide to the Book of Common Prayer: A Worldwide Survey included a chapter by Westerfield Tucker on the relationship between the Book of Common Prayer, John Wesley, and Methodism. She wrote for a February 2018 special issue of the Sewanee Theological Review on the possibility of revising the Episcopal Church's 1979 Book of Common Prayer.

In January 2023, she received the Berakah Award from the North American Academy of Liturgy. The award is given to "liturgical scholars and practitioners" who are members of the organization "in recognition of distinguished contribution to the profession". She was named a fellow of the Hymn Society in the United States and Canada in 2026.

== Personal life ==
Westerfield Tucker has served as a judge at American Kennel Club-licensed rally obedience dog competitions. A Welsh Corgi owned by Karen B. Westerfield Tucker and Stuart R. Tucker won an award for performance ability from the Mayflower Pembroke Welsh Corgi Club in 2013.

== Select bibliography ==
=== As editor ===
- The Sunday Service of the Methodists: Twentieth-Century Worship in Worldwide Methodism. New York: Oxford University Press. 1996. ISBN 978-0687011346.
- The Oxford History of Christian Worship. New York: Oxford University Press. 2006. ISBN 9780195138863. With Geoffrey Wainwright.

=== As author ===
- "John Wesley's Prayer Book Revision: The Text in Context" (PDF). Methodist History. 34 (4). July 1996.
- Stout, Harry S., ed. (2001). American Methodist Worship. Religion in America Series. New York: Oxford University Press.
- Hefling, Charles; Shattuck, Cynthia, eds. (2006). "John Wesley and the Methodists". The Oxford Guide to the Book of Common Prayer: A Worldwide Survey. New York: Oxford University Press. pp. 209–213.
