= The Oxford History of Christian Worship =

2006 history book on Christian worship

- Editors: Geoffrey Wainwright and Karen B. Westerfield Tucker
- Language: English
- Subject: Christian worship, Christian liturgy
- Publisher: Oxford University Press
- Publication date: 2006
- Publication place: United States
- Media type: Print (hardback, paperback)
- Pages: 916
- ISBN: 9780195138863

The Oxford History of Christian Worship is a 2006 nonfiction book published by Oxford University Press. Edited by Geoffrey Wainwright and Karen B. Westerfield Tucker, it comprises scholarly essays on Christian worship practices. Coverage is primarily historical, spanning from the origins of Christian worship to the modern era, with reference to a variety of denominations and traditions. It also contains discussion of the impact various theologies had upon Christian worship practices.

== Contents ==
The Oxford History of Christian Worship comprises 34 chapters covering the history and practices of Christian worship. Including the two editors, the chapters are written by 38 international authors of differing sectarian backgrounds.

Subject matter spans from the apostolic era to the modern period, with coverage including worship among medieval Western and Eastern Christianity, Protestantism, and monastic forms. Chapters vary in thematic breadth, with short excursuses or "sidebars" that emphasize specific subjects. An index is provided, with notes and bibliographies provided with each chapter.

Reviewer Gordon W. Lathrop considered the book "beautifully printed". Included alongside the text are images including photographs, sketches, and other depictions of artwork and liturgical vessels. Extended quotations from primary and secondary sources, including from both liturgical texts and contemporaneous writings, were demarcated by text over a "grayish" background and a dark border.

Scholars Geoffrey Wainwright (a minister in the British Methodist Church) and Karen B. Westerfield Tucker (a minister in the United Methodist Church) edited the volume. Wainwright provided an introduction that emphasized scripture and theology, while Westerfield Tucker wrote the chapter "Women in Worship". The two coauthored the book's conclusion, "Retrospect and Prospect".

== Critical reception ==
Gordon W. Lathrop, a pastor in the Evangelical Lutheran Church in America and an educator at the Lutheran Theological Seminary at Philadelphia, reviewed The Oxford History of Christian Worship for Theology Today. He considered it a representative volume for contemporary texts on liturgical history authored by multiple people. Lathrop contrasted the Oxford book with Frank Senn's 1997 Christian Liturgy: Catholic and Evangelical, noting that Senn's book benefits from internal consistency and strong organization at the expense of only presenting a single author's perspective. Lathrop, considering The Oxford History of Christian Worship "by far the best example in the English language" of a multiauthored liturgical history, found that repetition and differences in interpretations between authors were unavoidable.

In a review for The Catholic Historical Review, Kevin W. Irwin felt The Oxford History of Christian Worship was "well worth its (comparatively) modest price and deserves to be referred to by specialists and non specialists alike for years to come". Irwin found the brief coverage of monastic worship possibly wanting while suggesting that some redundancy between chapters could have been removed. He particularly praised the authors for their consideration of cultural and historical context in describing worship practices.

Richard A. Rosengarten's review for Church History appraised the chapters as sometimes more or less successful but praised the depth and clarity of content provided by the editors and contributors. He also commended the full-color reproductions of some artworks. While ultimately approving of The Oxford History of Christian Worship as a reference work, Rosengarten felt that there were limitations in scholarly engagement between recent developments in religious studies and a failure to explicitly reject "the dichotomy of the normative and the descriptive".
