= Geoffrey Wainwright =

British theologian (1939–2020)

The Reverend Geoffrey Wainwright
- Born: 1939; Monk Bretton, England
- Died: 17 March 2020 (aged 80–81)

Ecclesiastical career
- Religion: Christianity (Methodist)
- Church: Methodist Church of Great Britain

Academic background
- Education: University of Cambridge; University of Geneva

Academic work
- Discipline: Theology
- Institutions: Union Theological Seminary; Duke University
- Notable works: Doxology: The Praise of God in Worship, Doctrine and Life (1980); The Oxford History of Christian Worship (2006)

Geoffrey Wainwright (1939 – 17 March 2020) was an English theologian. He spent much of his career in the United States and taught at Duke Divinity School. Wainwright made major contributions to modern Methodist theology and Christian liturgy, and played a significant role on producing the text Baptism, Eucharist and Ministry, as a member of the Faith and Order Commission of the World Council of Churches (WCC).

== Biography ==
Born in Monk Bretton, Barnsley, Yorkshire, England, in 1939, Geoffrey Wainwright was an ordained minister of the Methodist Church of Great Britain. He received his university education in Cambridge, Geneva, and Rome. He held the Dr. Théol. degree from Geneva and the Doctor of Divinity degree from Cambridge. He served as a circuit minister in Liverpool (1964–1966) and then as a missionary teacher and pastor in Cameroon, West Africa (1967–1973). Returning to England, he taught scripture and theology at the Queen's College, Birmingham (1973–1979). In 1979 he moved to Union Theological Seminary, New York, where he became the Roosevelt Professor of Systematic Theology. He taught at Duke Divinity School from 1983 to his retirement in 2012, a part of Duke University in North Carolina, where he occupied the Robert Earl Cushman chair of Christian Theology. Wainwright held visiting professorships at the University of Notre Dame, the Gregorian and Angelicum universities in Rome and the United Faculty of Theology in Melbourne, Australia.

From 1976 to 1991, Wainwright was a member of the WCC Faith and Order and chaired the final redaction of the Lima text on Baptism, Eucharist and Ministry (1982). From 1986 to 2020 he was co-chairman of the Joint Commission between the World Methodist Council and the Roman Catholic Church. In 2004 he gave the opening address on behalf of "the ecclesial communities of the West" at the Roman symposium to mark the 40th anniversary of the Second Vatican Council’s decree on ecumenism.

Among Wainwright's books the most influential remains Doxology: The Praise of God in Worship, Doctrine and Life. His more recent books include For Our Salvation: Two Approaches to the Work of Christ (1997), Worship with One Accord: Where Liturgy and Ecumenism Embrace (1997), Is the Reformation Over? Catholics and Protestants at the Turn of the Millennia (which was the Père Marquette Lecture for 2000), an intellectual and spiritual biography of a father of the 20th century ecumenical church, Lesslie Newbigin: A Theological Life, and Embracing Purpose: Essays on God, the World and the Church (2007). His Eucharist and Eschatology (1971) and Christian Initiation (1969) were re-issued in 2002 and 2003 respectively. With Karen B. Westerfield Tucker he edited The Oxford History of Christian Worship (2006). His latest book is Faith, Hope and Love: The Ecumenical Trios of Virtues (2014).

Wainwright served as president of the international Societas Liturgica (1983–1985) as well as of the American Theological Society (1996–1997). He was honoured by the publication of Ecumenical Theology in Worship, Doctrine, and Life: Essays Presented to Geoffrey Wainwright on his Sixtieth Birthday (1999). He was awarded the 2005 Johannes Quasten Medal by the Catholic University of America for "excellence in theological scholarship".

In 2005, Wainwright said that he was delighted at the election of Cardinal Joseph Ratzinger as bishop of Rome. He called the new Pope a first-rate theologian with a subtle and penetrating mind.

He retired from Duke in 2012 and continued to make scholarly contributions in his retirement. He delivered a paper on "The Second Vatican Council: The Legacy from a Methodist Perspective" at the annual conference of the North American Academy of Ecumenists in Halifax in September 2012.
