= Robert E. Hayes Jr. =

Robert Eric Hayes Jr. is a member and serves as Bishop Emeritus of the Global Methodist Church. At its May 22, 2023, weekly meeting, The Global Methodist Church's Transitional Leadership Council (TLC) received the Rev. Dr. Robert Hayes Jr. as a clergy member in the new denomination and then immediately voted to confer upon him the title bishop emeritus. Hayes joins Bishop Emeritus Mike Lowry as the only other bishop granted that status.

Bishop Hayes previously served as a retired American bishop of the United Methodist Church (U.M.C.), currently serving as Bishop in Residence at The Woodlands Methodist Church in The Woodlands, Texas. Prior to retirement, he served as Bishop of the Oklahoma and Oklahoma Indian Missionary Conferences. Before being elected to the episcopacy in 2004, Hayes served as treasurer of the Texas Annual Conference. He has served as a pastor, district superintendent, and college chaplain.

== Education ==
Hayes earned a B.A. degree in English from Huston–Tillotson University, Austin, Texas (1969). He was initiated into Alpha Phi Alpha fraternity while a student at Huston–Tillotson. He earned an M.Th. degree from Perkins School of Theology, Southern Methodist University, Dallas, Texas (1972) and a D.Min. degree from Drew University, Madison, New Jersey (1997).

Hayes was a Methodist Fellow to Europe, Asia and Russia in 1967. He was a Crusade Scholar of the U.M.C. in 1970–72. He was in Who’s Who in American Colleges and Universities in 1968 and Outstanding Young Men in America in 1969.

== Ordained ministry ==
Hayes was ordained in the Texas Annual Conference of the U.M. Church. Before his election to the episcopacy, he served the following appointments: McCabe U.M.C., Longview, Texas, as well as chaplain and instructor of Religion and Philosophy at Wiley College (1972–75); Blueridge U.M.C., Houston, Texas (1975–86); Riverside U.M.C., Houston (1986–94); superintendent of the Houston Southwest District (1994–2001); and treasurer, Texas Annual Conference (2002–04).

Hayes was active in community ministries as well. He was a member of the Houston Board of Missions of the U.M.C. (1994–2001), was secretary of the Wesley House Community Center (1990–98), and served on the board of directors of the Houston Ebony Opera Guild (1986–94) and of the Methodist Home, Waco, Texas (1994–2000). He served on the board of directors of Bering-Omega Community Services (an HIV/AIDS ministry in Houston); on the advisory board of Covenant House of Texas (1999–2004); and as an officer and member of the Texas Conference Board of Trustees, the Board of Higher Education and Campus Ministry, the Division of Colleges, and the Committee on Ethnic Local Church Concerns.

== Honors ==
Hayes served as the Lenten Evangelist at Lovers Lane U.M.C., Dallas, Texas (2003); as a lecturer and Lenten Evangelist at the Chicago Temple U.M.C., Chicago, Illinois (1998); and lecturer and Lenten Evangelist at St. Luke's U.M.C., Houston (1999). He was named Outstanding Alumni by the Houston Chapter, Huston–Tillotson College (1989–90). He chaired the Legislative Committee on Faith and Order at the General Conference of the U.M.C., Cleveland, Ohio, (2000).

== Episcopal ministry ==
Bishop Hayes was endorsed for the Episcopacy by the General and Jurisdictional Delegations of the Texas Annual Conference and by Black Methodists for Church Renewal, South Central Jurisdiction. He was the first to be elected of four new bishops by the South Central Jurisdictional Conference meeting in Corpus Christi in 2004. He was assigned to the Oklahoma Episcopal Area (the Oklahoma and Oklahoma Indian Missionary Annual Conferences) with offices in Oklahoma City.

Under his influence and leadership, St. Paul's School of Theology (in Kansas City) and Oklahoma City University (OCU) worked together to create a new St. Paul's Seminary on the campus at OCU, opening in the fall of 2008.

Retiring as Bishop of the Oklahoma Episcopal Area of the UMC in 2016, Bishop Hayes was invited to join the staff of 14,000+ membership the Woodlands Methodist Church in the Woodlands, Texas, where he continues his ministry as bishop in residence.

== Other information ==
Bishop Hayes serves on the Board of Trustees of Asbury Theological Seminary (Wilmore, Kentucky).

Bishop Hayes was elected in 2008 to serve as the Secretary of the Council of Bishops of the United Methodist Church. He was assigned to serve as one of the Episcopal Directors of the General Commission of Finance and Administration.

== See also ==
- List of bishops of the United Methodist Church
