= Portrait of a Young Woman (Hals; Hull) =

Painting by Frans Hals

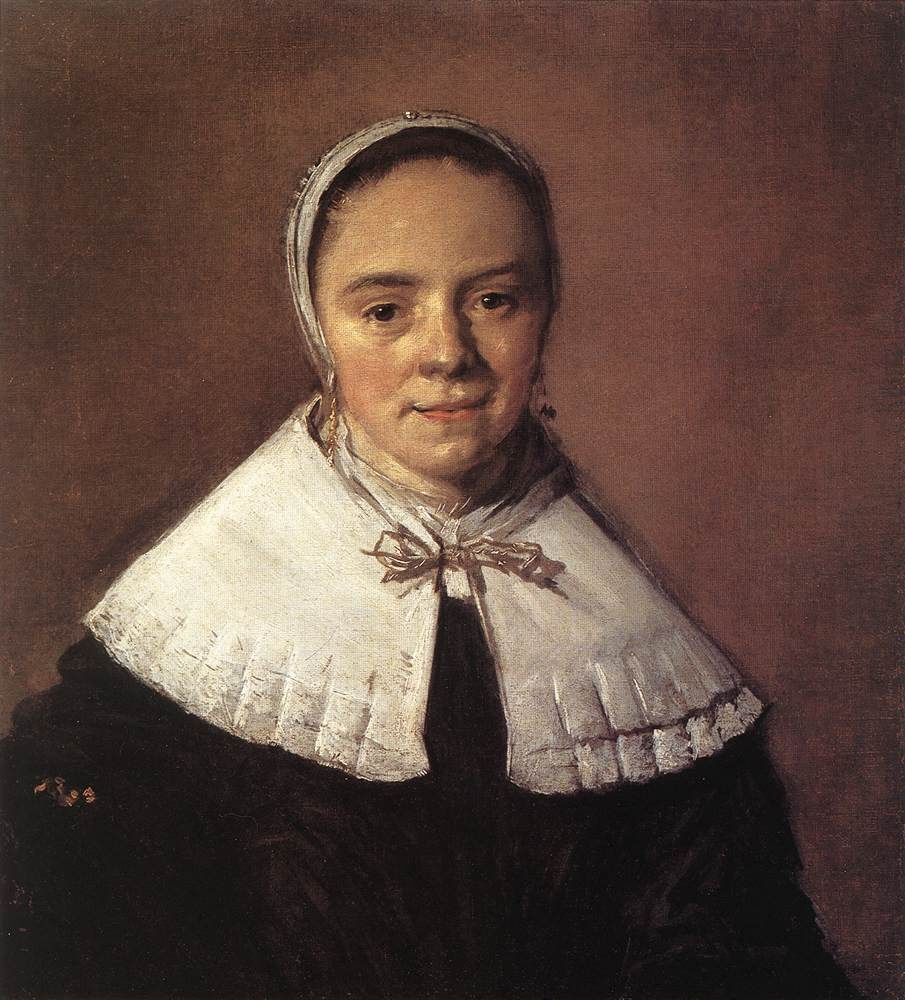
- Artist: Frans Hals
- Year: Between 1655 and 1660
- Medium: Oil colours on canvas
- Subject: Head and upper body of a young woman dressed in black with a white tippet; her facial expression
- Dimensions: 60 cm × 56 cm (24 in × 22 in)
- Location: Ferens Art Gallery, Kingston upon Hull, England
- Owner: City Museums and Art Galleries, Hull
- Accession: KINCM:2005.5003

The Portrait of a Young Woman is a figurative painting by male 17th-century Dutch master Frans Hals. It is in the permanent collection at the Ferens Art Gallery in Hull, East Yorkshire. It depicts a young woman seen full face against a plain background. Her name is not now known; nor is anything else about her beyond what we see in this painting. She wears a black gown of plain material ("stuff") over a white chemise, with a white tippet over her shoulders and a white coif. Hals probably painted her in Haarlem some time between 1655 and 1660, when he was about 75 years old. The work is executed in Hals's "rough" style: that is to say, his brushwork is visible—not smoothed over or blended. It has been supposed that Hals would also have painted a matching portrait of the young woman's husband and that the two pictures would once have hung side by side.

Andrew Graham-Dixon has remarked of the Portrait of a Young Woman: "We don't know who she was ..., but how important she is as a human being! What a wonderful depiction that is of someone!"

== Description ==
"The Portrait of a Young Woman is unforgettable for its serene but direct smile, and for the disarming simplicity with which the figure looks out at us." (Christopher Wright)

The painting is a borststuk, the Dutch term in Hals's time for a "head-and-upper-body painting of a person". It depicts a single female sitter looking straight at us full face, eyes and lips seemingly on the point of breaking into a little smile or at the onset of some enigmatic affect or feeling, and about almost imperceptibly to raise her left eyebrow. "The moment of expression is arrested, as though accidentally, to give life and character to the face." (W. A. Martin)

We cannot see the sitter's hands. She is not doing anything: she is not making lace, playing the spinet, or doing anything else that might, for instance, suggest assiduous domesticity or cultivated recreation. She is not seen to be holding any props such as keys, a fan, or a bible, that could encourage us to speculate about her status or aspirations. Hals's loose, unblended brushwork, particularly in her face, conveys the "life and character" Martin writes of. If there were a (minimally) narrative subject of the work, it would appear to be the transition in the woman's expression, while its descriptive subject is her gentleness and humility.

She is sitting or standing near, and not quite square, to the plane of the canvas; her upper body extends across almost the whole width of the painting. Her left shoulder (to our right) is a little further from us than her right shoulder, so while her face is at the centre of the canvas, her upper body appears to be turned slightly to the right from our point of view. If this were one of a pair of marriage portraits, she would therefore be facing a little away from her husband instead of towards him. (Usually, in a pair of Dutch 17th-century marriage portraits, both figures are harmoniously oriented towards the same point somewhere between us and them.) She tilts her head a little to her right, as can be seen from the lines of her eyes and mouth. The effect is to modulate what in her day might otherwise, for a woman, have seemed a less than modest head-on stare. The young woman's flesh is painted pale with warm highlights, her hair is black and drawn back tight under her coif, and her eyes are dark brown. Hals does not seem to have painted any eyelashes. The light falls on her face from in front of her and our left. The plain background is a warm greyish orange-brown, graduating from darker on the left to lighter on the right. When the picture was restored in about 1952, some parts of the forehead, of the gown, and outer parts of the background showed signs of wear incurred during earlier cleaning work. Hals did not sign or date the Portrait of a Young Woman. The conjectural date of 1655–1660 relies on studies of Hals's painting technique, which changed over time, and on the clothes worn by the sitter.

The picture is painted in oils on canvas and measures some 60 x 55.6 cm (height x width)—it is therefore a cabinet work in the sense that it was painted small enough to hang in an ordinary Dutch home. W. A. Martin, the first to document the painting as a work by Frans Hals (in 1952), had access to the notes of Horace Buttery, who had cleaned it. Martin makes no mention of any sign that it had been cut down from a larger format.

== Clothes and status ==
Claus Grimm tells us that only important people of elevated social or official status had their portrait painted in Hals's day, and that when such people sat for a portrait, they posed, and were dressed, to impress. He concludes that the purpose of such portraits was less to capture the sitter as a person and more to record their high status. However, in the Portrait of a Young Woman there is nothing calculated to impress; nothing for instance, to signal conspicuous wealth—there is no elaborate collar, or any fine lace or embroidery.

The woman who sat for the Portrait of a Young Woman wears a white chemise under an apparently plain black gown, and over her shoulders a white linen tippet or collar tied with a small bow of narrow silvery-golden ribbon. Her tippet is pleated or layered round its lower edge, but is otherwise plain. On her head she wears a coif fastened at the top with a single pearl-headed pin. On her right sleeve is a little brooch or other ornament, the shape and colour of which seem to echo the shape and colour of her ribbon bow. According to W. A. Martin and Lucy West she also wears drop earrings. They are simple and appear not to be a matching pair. Sketchily rendered, they might just as plausibly be construed as the loose ends of a golden-coloured cord meant for tying the coif.

The general style of the young woman's attire would have been familiar to the people of Haarlem at her time, at least as an option for older ladies. One of the regentesses of the old men's almshouse (the second figure from the right in their group portrait that Hals painted in about 1664) is similarly dressed.

== Pendant marriage portraits and independent women ==
Christopher Wright, who catalogued the Ferens collection in 2002, observed of the Young Woman: "The sitter is likely to have been the wife of a Haarlem burgher or merchant, as isolated female portraits are very rare in Dutch 17th-century painting—it is therefore probable that Hals also painted the sitter's husband, although no surviving portrait can be put forward as the possible pendant." Here, Wright is distinguishing between portraits (commissioned by or on behalf of the sitter) on the one hand and tronies and other genre paintings featuring a model (who would typically have been paid to sit for the artist) on the other hand. It is stand-alone female portraits that are apparently a rarity. The description of the Portrait of a Young Woman associated with the Ferens Art Gallery's website adopts Wright's assumption that there is probably also a pendant portrait, perhaps lost, of the young woman's husband.

=== Typical characteristics of 17th-century pendant marriage portraits ===
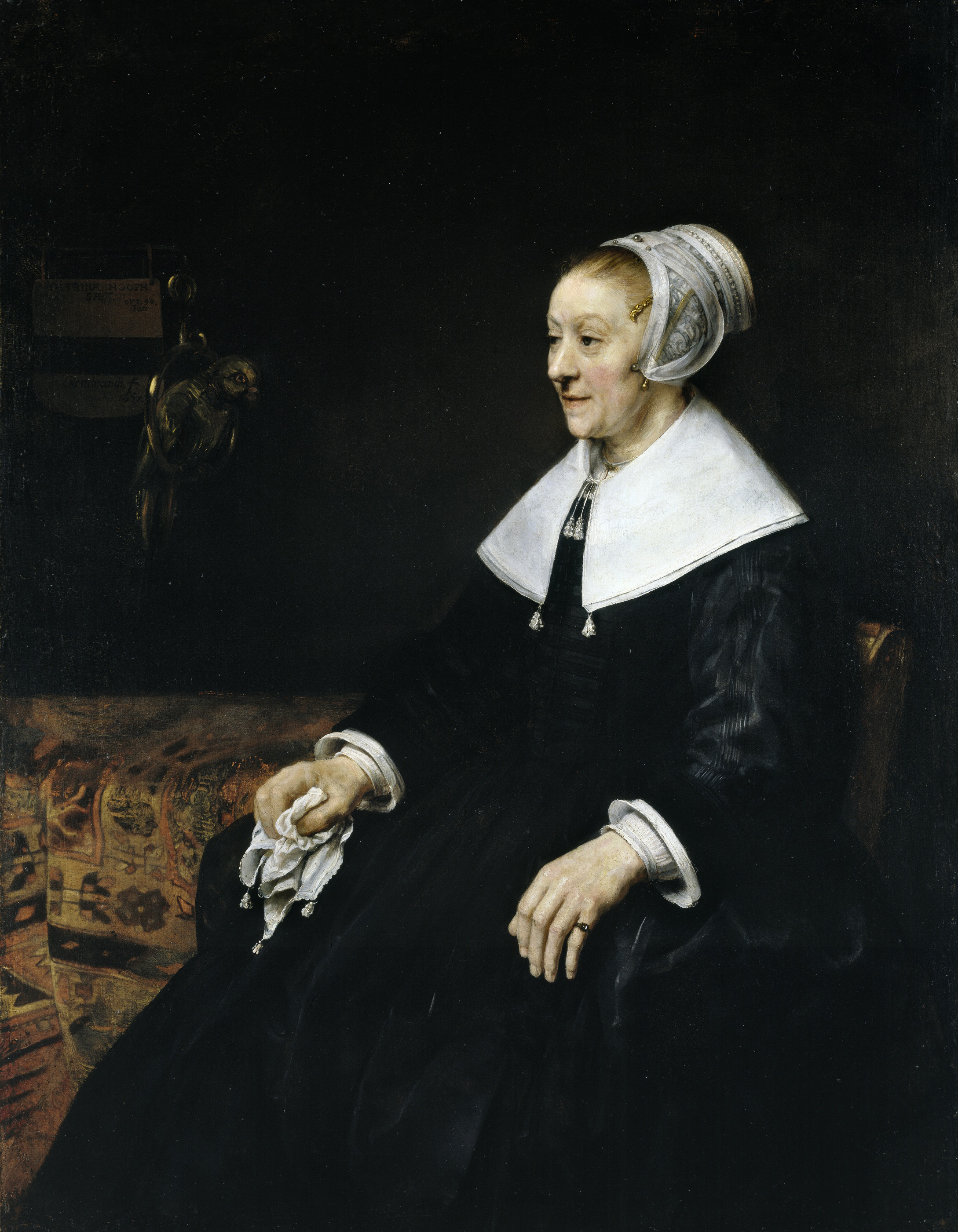
For comparison: Rembrandt's Portrait of Catrina Hooghsaet (1657). Hooghsaet poses as if for a pendant marriage portrait, but without some of the usual specific attributes for such a commission. For instance, she wears no wedding ring or stomacher, because she is separated from her husband. She is dressed stylishly but plainly, without ostentatious ornament, because she is a Mennonite. Nonetheless, her plain clothes are of the best linen and finest silk: she is a wealthy Mennonite woman of independent means.

There are several conventional characteristics and attributes of 17th-century Dutch pendant marriage portraits, of which Hals painted several pairs. (See the List of paintings by Frans Hals, where many works known confidently to be pendant pairs are glossed as such in the Inventory no. column.) The conventional characteristics and attributes of such pairs include, for example:

- The size of the portraits is the same or very similar, as is the shape, and both portraits have similar backgrounds.
- The portrait of the man is meant to hang to the left of the portrait of the woman.
- The woman is shown further back from the plane of the picture's support, while the man is literally more forward.
- The sitters relate to one another in their stance or posture, or by gesture. Typically, the body of each is turned some way towards the body of the other but both their faces look out on the world.
- If (like Hals) the artist could offer both the loose style of portraiture (that is, with unblended brushwork, known as "rough") and the smooth or neat style (that is, with blended brushwork), the man was likely to be painted relatively rough and the woman smooth.
- Both sitters are typically shown wearing their "Sunday best" clothes, often including fine lace at their collars and cuffs, with leather gloves, a fan, or a bible as attributes signalling wealth or respectability (although among some groups, such as the Mennonites, who were prominent in Haarlem, such vanity was frowned upon).
  - A married female sitter typically wears the specific attributes of a married woman:
    - A stomacher
    - A wedding ring on the fourth finger (Roman Catholic) or the forefinger (Protestant)—or both

Not all pairs of Dutch marriage portraits exhibit all of these conventions. It was the sitters rather than the artist who chose how they were to be portrayed. In the Portrait of a Young Woman at the Ferens we can see none of the conventional attributes of a married woman sitting with her husband for a pair of pendant portraits. We cannot see whether she is wearing or holding gloves, or wearing rings, or other attributes that might indicate her marital status. She does not seem to wear a stomacher, which would have been an indicator that she is married.

Moreover, by 1655–1660, when Frans Hals probably painted the Portrait of a Young Woman, companionability of the spouses towards one another was a fashionable style in bourgeois Dutch marriage portraits, particularly in the work of Hals and Rembrandt. It was displacing a more staid, courtly style which had prevailed earlier in the century. In the Portrait of a Young Woman, Hals does not portray anything identifiable as companionability towards a putative spouse in another painting; rather, this sitter seems to be alone.

=== Examples of women from pairs of marriage portraits by Frans Hals ===
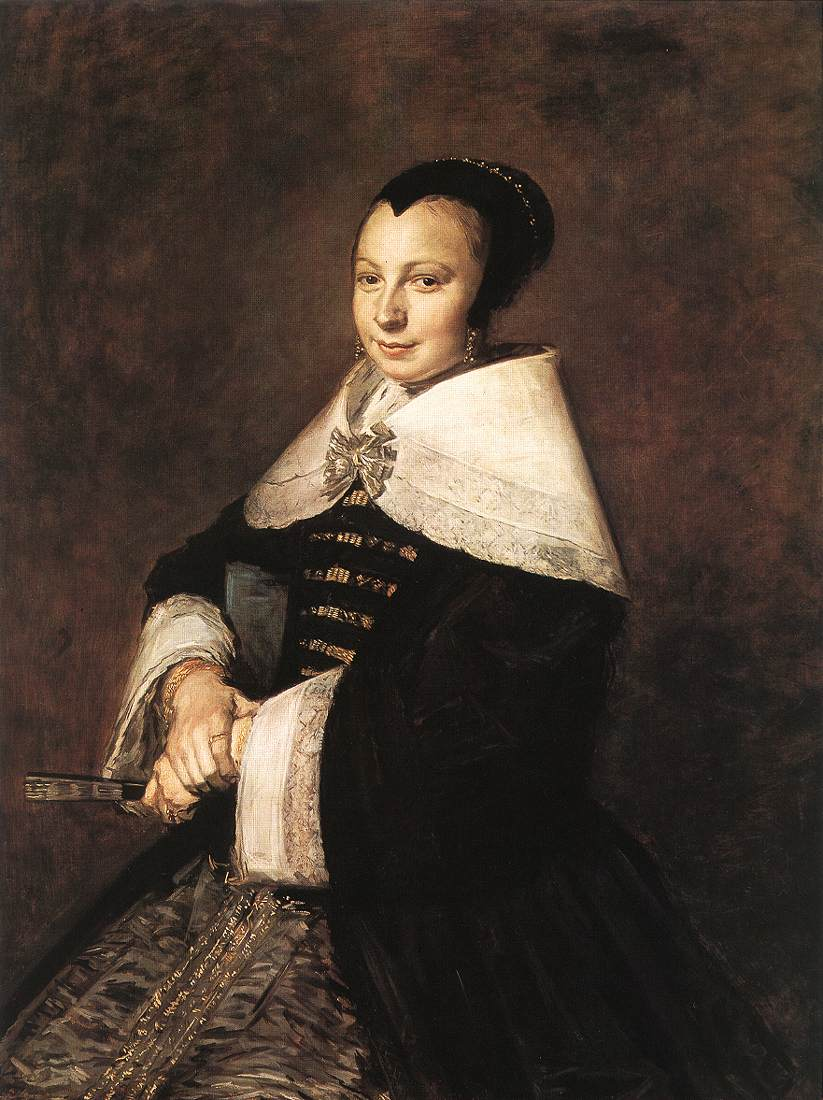
Portrait of a Woman Holding a Fan. This sitter is set well back from the plane of the canvas; her body is partly oriented towards the man's portrait which conventionally hangs to the left of hers. Like the sitter for the Hull painting, she wears a tippet rather than a ruff. However, this sitter's clothes and accessories all conspicuously signal wealth. She is rendered in, for Hals, a relatively smooth style. (Taft, Cincinnati, Ohio)

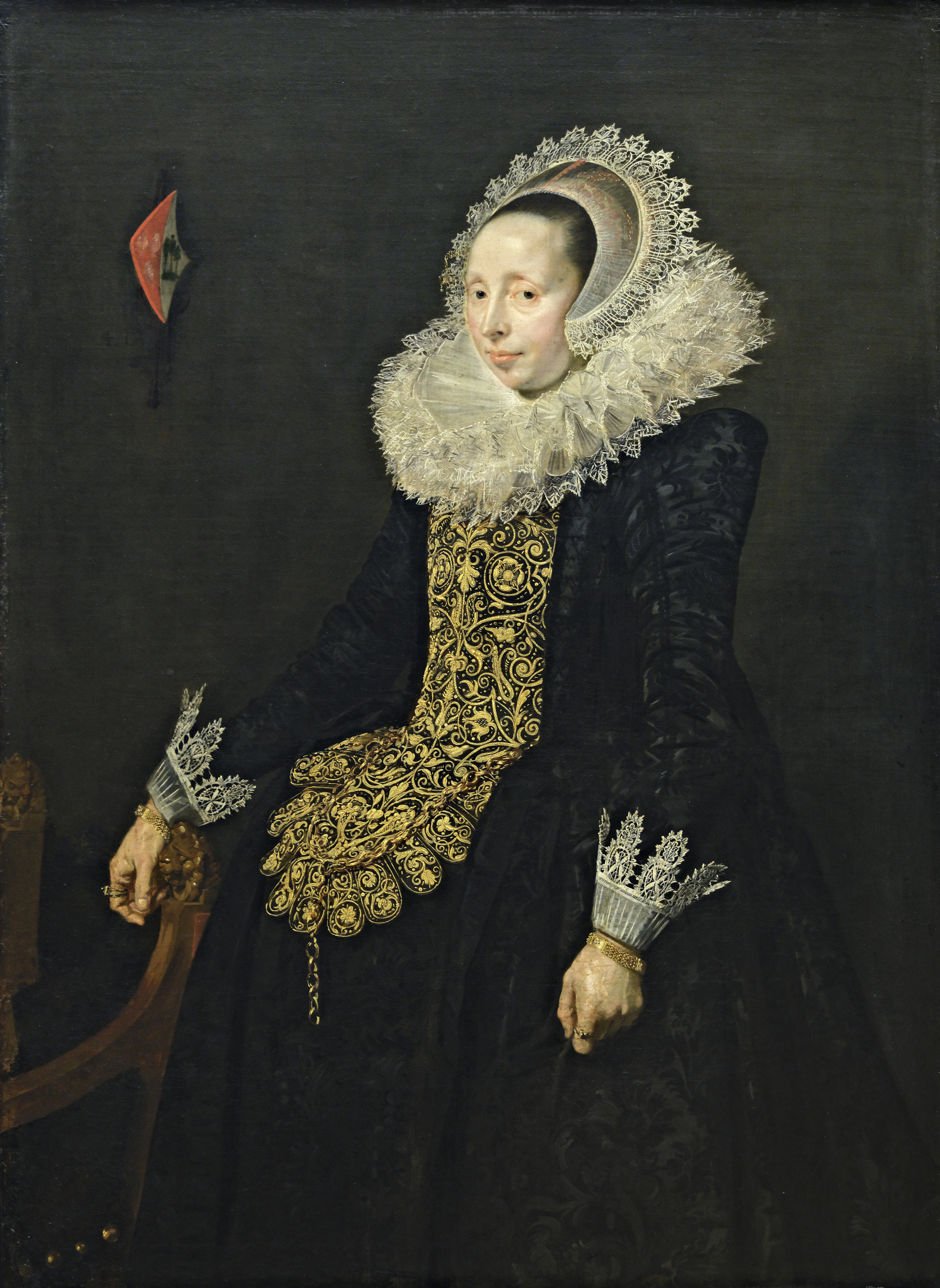
Portrait of Catarina Both van der Eem. This woman wears a richly embroidered, whale-boned stomacher, an elaborate ruff with lace trim, a bonnet and cuffs of fine lace, a jewelled forefinger wedding-ring on either hand, gold bracelets, and a substantial gold chain. (The Louvre, Paris)

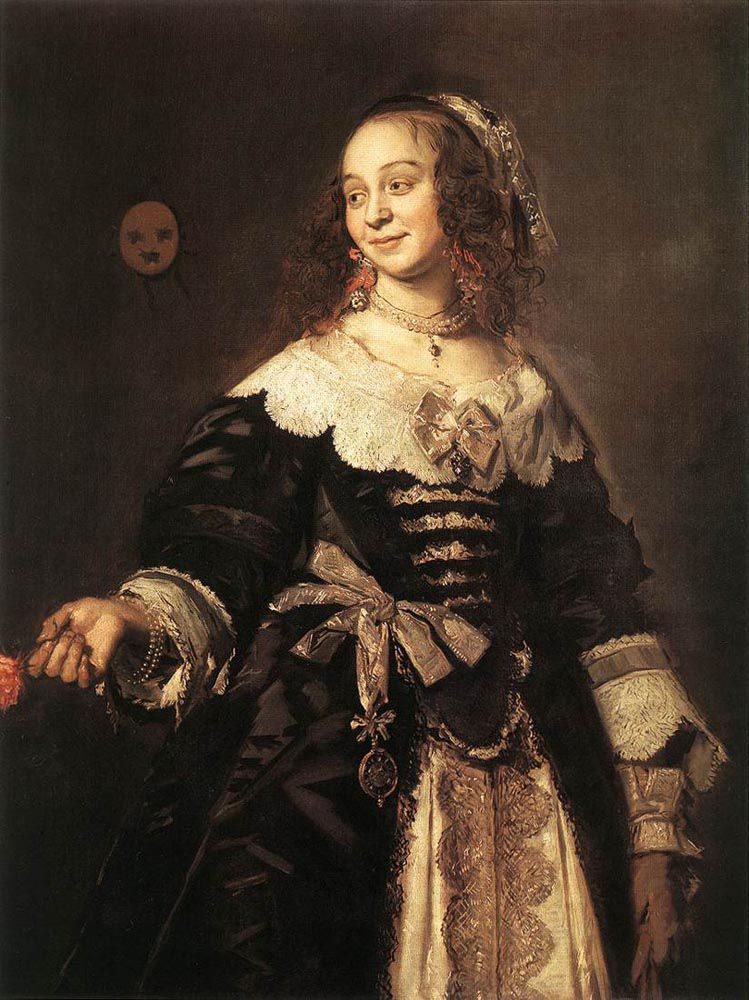
Portrait of Isabella Coymans. This subject is depicted in a more "companionable" style. Her stance and demeanour are less serious than was usual for a marriage portrait. Although she turns her body away from her husband, whose portrait would originally have hung to the left of hers, her smile and her rose are clearly meant for him. Her attire is the height of late-1640s fashion. (Private collection)

=== Independent women ===
"In the 17th century, women in the Dutch Republic had a relatively high degree of independence, both inside and outside the home." Dutch towns in particular are widely thought to have offered women exceptional freedom. Foreign visitors to the Dutch Republic remarked on the visibility of women in business and public life. For significant periods in the 17th century, a substantial proportion of Dutch men were away at sea or at war, which may have left some women space to gain more prominence and independence than was then usual in other Western cultures. Women could establish their own businesses with capital from an inheritance or from relatives. According to one Dutch farce from 1692, the mistress of a household might even reward her maid's discretion so generously that the maid could set herself up in business.

Prof. Danielle van den Heuvel writes that there were fewer obstacles to women's making their own living in the trades regulated by guilds (or obstacles were less stringently applied) in Haarlem than elsewhere in the Dutch Republic.

== Title of the work; identity of the sitter ==
Hals did not give his paintings a title. We know his works by the names given them by authorities such as cataloguers, curators, critics, and art historians, and those authorities do not necessarily all give the same name to the same picture. The Portrait of a Young Woman at the Ferens has always been called a portrait—Portrait of a Lady, Portrait of a Woman, and now, often, Portrait of a Young Woman. We do not know who the sitter is. Her attire, stance, and expression are not typical for the subject of a commissioned 17th-century Dutch portrait. Nor do we know, except to the extent we can rely on the evidence of painting technique and clothing style, quite when Hals painted her. If it was indeed in about 1655 to 1660, she could have been of an age with Hals's grandchildren. Hals was, as Michael Prodger notes, the first artist to blur the distinction between the genre scene and the portrait. Indeed, the Hals portrait at the Ferens might not be not a portrait at all, but more a sympathetic tronie, rather in the way the painting of Rembrandt's elderly mother in the Royal Collection is a tronie rather than a portrait.

== Provenance, attributions, exhibitions, and authenticity ==
Before 1952, little was known about the Portrait of a Young Woman. In 1952, George Wyndham of Orchard Wyndham, Somerset, owned the painting and understood that it had come to him by inheritance through several generations from the Earls of Egremont. Until that year, it had been misattributed to Aelbert Cuyp, a landscape and riverscape specialist from Dordrecht and contemporary of Frans Hals—the Cuyps were a family of well-known artists, including at least one portraitist. In 1952, the Portrait of a Young Woman was cleaned for Wyndham by Horace Buttery, assessed and attributed to Hals by W. A. Martin, and shown as "Portrait of a Lady by Frans Hals", catalogue no. 137, at the Royal Academy of Arts' 1952–1953 winter exhibition Dutch Pictures 1450–1750.

The painting was put up at Christie's in 1961, but in 1963 Wyndham sold it to the Ferens for a modest sum.

In 2016, the Portrait of a Young Woman was a guest at the National Gallery in London while refurbishment work was done at the Ferens in preparation for Hull's year (2017) as the UK City of Culture.

Among several other exhibitions at which the Portrait of a Young Woman has been shown are:

- 1957, City Art Gallery, Manchester, Art Treasures Centenary (cat. no. 118)
- 1968, Walker Art Gallery, Liverpool, Gifts to Galleries (cat. no. 40)
- 1982–1983, City Art Gallery, Leeds, Dutch 17th-Century Paintings from Yorkshire Public Collections (cat. no. 4)
- 1989, Museum and Art Gallery, Birmingham, Images of a Golden Age—Dutch 17th-Century Paintings (cat. no. 55)
- 1989–1990, Royal Academy of Arts, London and Frans Hals Museum, Haarlem, Frans Hals (cat. no. 74)
- 1995–1996, City Art Gallery, Leeds, Saved for Yorkshire
- 1998, Royal Academy of Arts, London, Art Treasures of England (cat. no. 305)
- 2023–2024, National Gallery, London, Frans Hals (cat. fig. 63)

Andrew Graham-Dixon filmed and published a perambulation of the 2023–2024 National Gallery exhibition, in which he remarks of the Portrait of a Young Woman: "We don't know who she was. She probably was no one—as it were, with a capital I—important, but how important she is as a human being! What a wonderful depiction that is of someone! You feel that she knows her own mind, she's true to herself. It's ... just such a great painting of what it is in that moment to be alive. ... It is only in this society, this Dutch society, ... that, no matter who you are, you are worthy of respect, you have dignity, you have mind. [You have] the painter's attention."

Grimm did not include the Hull Portrait of a Young Woman in his 1989 catalogue raisonné of Hals's complete works (Frans Hals—Das Gesamtwerk). Based on his detailed analysis of the painting's execution, Grimm subsequently assigned it to Hals's workshop, possibly Frans Hals the Younger. He finds the woman's smile "frozen".

However, Seymour Slive contends in his authoritative and comprehensive Royal Academy catalogue (1989) that "Martin rightly recognised it as an authentic work by Hals" and describes it as "an affecting portrait which shows that old Hals lost none of his ability to characterise the poignantly tender side of a young woman's nature". Bart Cornelis, Curator of Dutch and Flemish Paintings (1600–1800) at the National Gallery, curated and catalogued the London station of the London–Amsterdam–Berlin Frans Hals exhibition of 2023–2024. He included the Portrait of a Young Woman in the London exhibition, remarking in the catalogue that the sitter's "direct yet slightly hesitant expression stops us in our tracks. The picture is impossible to forget."

== Hals's art and artifice ==
Only Rembrandt and Hals place such unembarrassed emphasis on the artifice of their art, a break with tradition that would not be taken up again until the 19th century. Yet all these whorls and scratches inevitably resolve into Haarlemmers who, though centuries dead, illustrate the paradox that makes Hals's work so fascinating: Blatantly artificial, yet so alive that his subjects always seem to have been snapped in flagrante as if by a canny street photographer. Roman Vishniac's Warsaw, Vivian Maier's Chicago, Henri Cartier-Bresson's Paris: all descend from Frans Hals's Haarlem.

— Benjamin Moser
