= Paul F. Bradshaw =

British Anglican priest, theologian, historian of liturgy and academic

The Reverend Paul F. Bradshaw FRHistS
- Born: Paul Frederick Bradshaw; 9 August 1945 (age 81); Preston, Lancashire, England
- Title: Professor of Liturgy

Academic background
- Education: Clare College, Cambridge; Westcott House, Cambridge; King's College London
- Thesis: 'The Anglican Ordinal: its history and development from the Reformation to the present day'

Academic work
- Discipline: Theology
- Sub-discipline: Liturgy; History of early Christianity
- Institutions: Chichester Theological College; Ripon College Cuddesdon; University of Notre Dame

Paul Frederick Bradshaw, FRHistS (born 9 August 1945) is a British Anglican priest, theologian, historian of liturgy, and academic. In addition to parish ministry, he taught at Chichester Theological College and Ripon College Cuddesdon (both Anglican theological colleges). From 1985 to 2013, he was Professor of Liturgy at the University of Notre Dame in the United States.

== Early life and education ==
Bradshaw was born on 9 August 1945 in Preston, Lancashire, England. He studied theology at Clare College, Cambridge. He achieved first-class honours in Part I of the Tripos, and upper second-class honours in Part II. He graduated from the University of Cambridge with a Bachelor of Arts (BA) degree in 1966; as per tradition, his BA was promoted to a Master of Arts (MA Cantab) degree in 1970. From 1966 to 1967, he taught at Wandsworth School in London; the school closed in 1989.

In 1967, Bradshaw entered Westcott House, Cambridge, an Anglican theological college in the Liberal Anglo-Catholic tradition. While training for ordination at Westcott House, he also undertook postgraduate research at King's College London. He completed his Doctor of Philosophy (PhD) degree in 1971. His doctoral thesis was titled "The Anglican Ordinal: its history and development from the Reformation to the present day".

In 1983, Bradshaw was awarded by incorporation a Master of Arts (MA Oxon) degree by the University of Oxford; this was to match his MA status at Cambridge and is not a standalone degree. In 1994, he was awarded a Doctor of Divinity (DD) degree by the University of Oxford.

== Ordained ministry ==
Bradshaw was ordained in the Church of England as a deacon in 1969 and as a priest in 1970 by Michael Ramsey, the then Archbishop of Canterbury. From 1969 to 1971, he served his curacy at St John the Baptist, West Wickham, then in the Diocese of Canterbury. From 1971 to 1973, he served a further curacy in the Parish of St Martin and St Paul in the City of Canterbury.

In 1978, Bradshaw moved to the Diocese of St Albans. He was vicar of St Leonard's Church, Flamstead, Hertfordshire, between 1978 and 1982. During this time, he was also director of the Ministerial Training Scheme for the diocese.

In 1990, Bradshaw was made an honorary canon of the Episcopal Diocese of Northern Indiana. In 1995, he was appointed a priest-vicar of Westminster Abbey in London, England. He was a member of the Church of England Liturgical Commission from 1981 to 1985 and 2001 to 2010.

== Academic career ==
Bradshaw is a specialist in the early history of Christian liturgy. He has written or edited over 20 books and has contributed more than 90 articles or essays. He has collaborated with Lawrence A. Hoffman on several essay collections about the evolution of worship in Christian and Jewish communities in North America.

Bradshaw began his academic career at a theological college, rather than at a university. From 1973 to 1978, he was a tutor at Chichester Theological College. Having returned to parish ministry, he was also director in the St Albans diocese Ministerial Training Scheme between 1978 and 1982. From 1983 to 1985, he was vice-principal of Ripon College Cuddesdon, an Anglican theological college near Oxford.

In 1985, Bradshaw moved to the United States. From 1985 to 2013, he taught in the Department of Theology, University of Notre Dame, a Roman Catholic university in Indiana. Between 1985 and 1990, he was an associate professor of liturgy. From 1990 to retirement, he was professor of liturgy. He was a visiting research fellow at Merton College, Oxford, in 2011. He retired in 2013 and was appointed emeritus professor.

From 1987 to 2005, Bradshaw was editor-in-chief of Studia Liturgica, an international journal. He was President of the Societas Liturgica from 1993 to 1995, and of the North American Academy of Liturgy.

== Honours ==
In 1991, Bradshaw was elected a Fellow of the Royal Historical Society (FRHistS). On 18 May 2005, he was awarded an honorary Doctor of Divinity (DD) degree by the General Theological Seminary, New York City. In 2008, he was awarded the Berakah Award by the North American Academy of Liturgy. It is awarded yearly to a distinguished liturgist "in recognition of distinguished contribution to the professional work of liturgy".

== Works ==
Bradshaw' book, The Search for the Origins of Christian Worship, has had two editions (1992 and 2002), and has become a popular textbook for those studying early Christian worship. It has been translated into French, Italian, Japanese and Russian.

Works authored

- The Anglican Ordinal: Its history and development from the Reformation to the present day (Alcuin Club Collections 53, London: SPCK 1971)
- Daily Prayer in the Early Church: A Study of the Origin and Early Development of the Divine Office (Alcuin Club Collections 63, London: SPCK 1981; New York: OUP 1982; reprinted Eugene, Oregon: Wipf & Stock 2008)
- Ordination Rites of the Ancient Churches of East and West (New York: Pueblo 1990) ISBN 9780925127006
- The Search for the Origins of Christian Worship: Sources and Methods for the Study of Early Liturgy (London: SPCK/New York: OUP 1992, 2002)
- Early Christian Worship: A Basic Introduction to Ideas and Practice (London: SPCK/Collegeville: The Liturgical Press, 1996, 2010)
- The Apostolic Tradition: A Commentary (with Maxwell E. Johnson and L. Edward Phillips; Hermeneia Commentary Series; Minneapolis: Fortress Press 2002)
- Eucharistic Origins (Alcuin Club Collections 80, London: SPCK/New York: OUP 2004)
- Reconstructing Early Christian Worship (London: SPCK, 2009/Collegeville: The Liturgical Press 2010)
- The Origins of Feasts, Fasts and Seasons in Early Christianity (with Maxwell E. Johnson; Alcuin Club Collections 86, London: SPCK/Collegeville: The Liturgical Press 2011)
- The Eucharistic Liturgies: Their Evolution and Interpretation (with Maxwell E. Johnson; Alcuin Club Collections 87, London: SPCK 2012/Collegeville: The Liturgical Press 2012) ISBN 9780814662403

Works edited

- The Making of Jewish and Christian Worship (Notre Dame Press, 1991) ISBN 9780268012083
- The Changing Face of Jewish and Christian Worship in North America (Notre Dame Press, 1992).
- Life-Cycles in Jewish and Christian Worship (Notre Dame Press, 1996).
- Passover and Easter: Origin and History to Modern Times (Notre Dame Press, 1999).
- Passover and Easter: The Symbolic Structuring of Sacred Seasons (Notre Dame Press 1999).
- The New Westminster Dictionary of Liturgy and Worship (Louisville: Westminster Press 2002).
- Foundations in Ritual Studies: A Reader for Students of Christian Worship (London: SPCK/Grand Rapids: Baker Academic 2007).
