= North American Academy of Liturgy =

The North American Academy of Liturgy (NAAL) is an ecumenical and inter-religious association of liturgical scholars who collaborate in research.

== Description ==
According to the NAAL, "academy members are specialists in liturgical studies, theologians, artists, musicians, and persons in related disciplines, whose work affects liturgical expression and furthers liturgical understanding." It was founded at the University of Notre Dame in January 1975; the first official meeting was held in January 1976 at Loyola University in New Orleans, Louisiana. Its membership is heavily Catholic, Episcopalian, and Lutheran.

The NAAL sponsors an annual meeting and offers periodic seminars on liturgical studies. It also publishes Proceedings of the North American Academy of Liturgy annually, with seminar reports and peer-reviewed seminar papers in the field. Its offices are in Saint Meinrad, Indiana; the NAAL received an Internal Revenue Service nonprofit ruling in 1994.

== Notable members ==
- Paul F. Bradshaw
- Mary Collins (theologian)
- Marion Hatchett
- H. Boone Porter
- Jeffery Rowthorn
- Lester Ruth
- Don Saliers
- Frank Senn
- Robert F. Taft, SJ
- Louis Weil
- Clarence Rivers
