= Ferens Art Gallery =

Art gallery in Hull, England

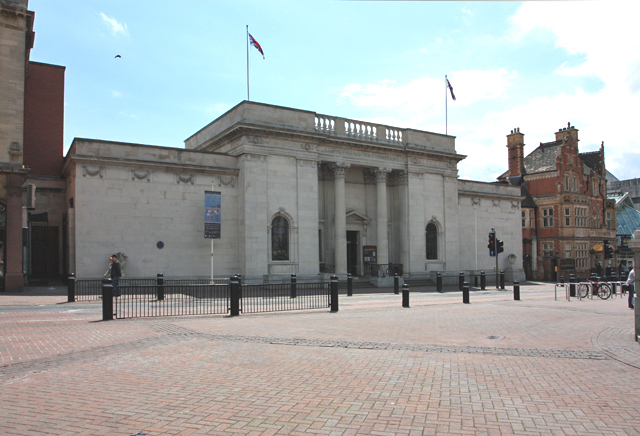

- Location within the East Riding of Yorkshire
- Established: 1927
- Location: Queen Victoria Square, Hull
- Coordinates: 53.743419°N 0.33928°W
- Website: www.hullmuseums.co.uk/ferens-art-gallery

The Ferens Art Gallery is an art gallery in the English city of Kingston upon Hull. The site and money for the gallery were donated to the city by Thomas Ferens, after whom it is named. The architects were S. N. Cooke and E. C. Davies. Opened in 1927, it was restored and extended in 1991. The gallery features an extensive array of both permanent collections and roving exhibitions.

Among the paintings in the permanent collection is a portrait of an unknown young woman by Frans Hals.

Past temporary exhibitions included features on Queen Victoria and Hull – part of the Royal Collection Trust touring show (2022–2023), Ian McKeever RA (2019), Francis Bacon (2017) and David Remfry RA (1975 and 2005). The building also houses a children's gallery and a popular cafe. The building is now a Grade II listed building.

In 2009, an exhibition and live performance took place at the venue, to help celebrate the 25th anniversary of the opening of The New Adelphi Club, a live music venue less than 2 miles (3 km) north.

In 2013, the gallery acquired a fourteenth-century painting by Pietro Lorenzetti, depicting Christ Between Saints Paul and Peter. The acquisition was jointly funded by the Ferens Endowment Fund, the Heritage Lottery Fund and Art Fund.

In May 2015, it was announced that the gallery would get a £4.5 million makeover to enable it to host the Turner Prize in 2017 as part of the UK City of Culture programme. The gallery reopened on 13 January 2017. On 8 February 2017, Charles, Prince of Wales and Camilla, Duchess of Cornwall visited the gallery to view the completed refurbishment.

In January 2018, Hull City Council announced that a record 519,000 visits were made to the gallery during 2017.

== See also ==
- Listed buildings in Kingston upon Hull (Myton Ward)

== Art in the Ferens Art Gallery (selected) ==
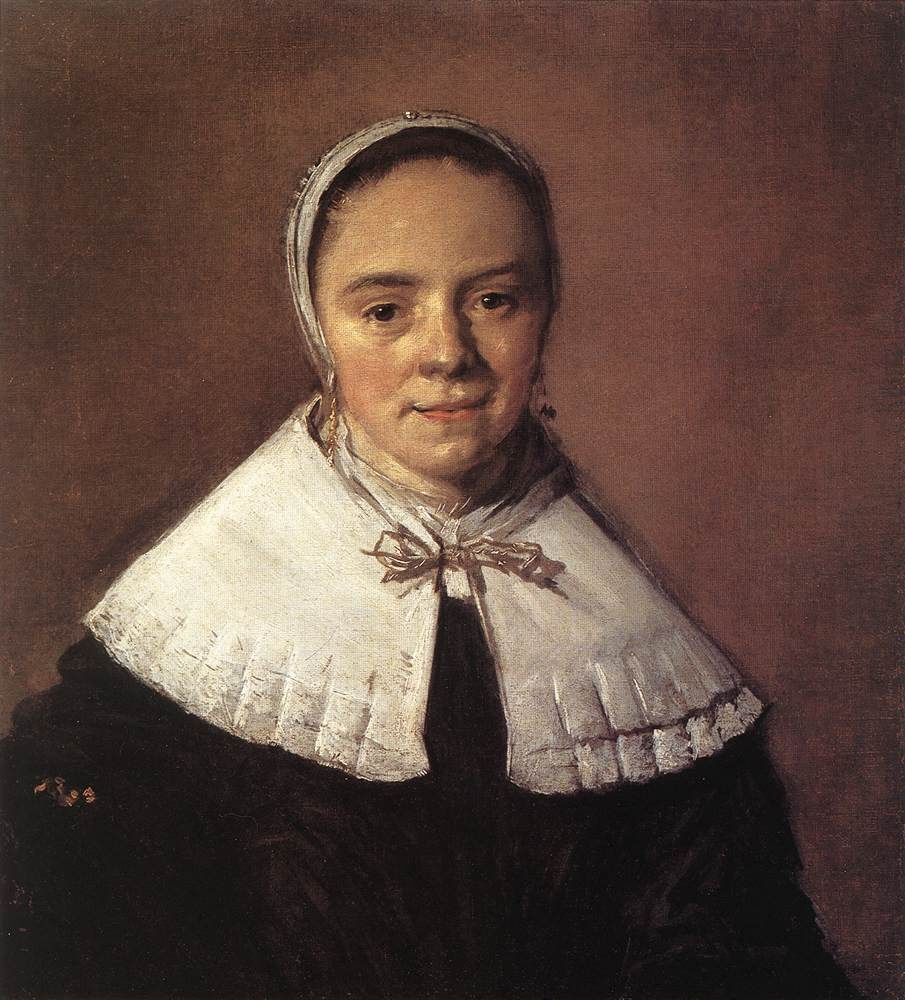
Frans Hals, Portrait of a Young Woman (between 1655 and 1660)

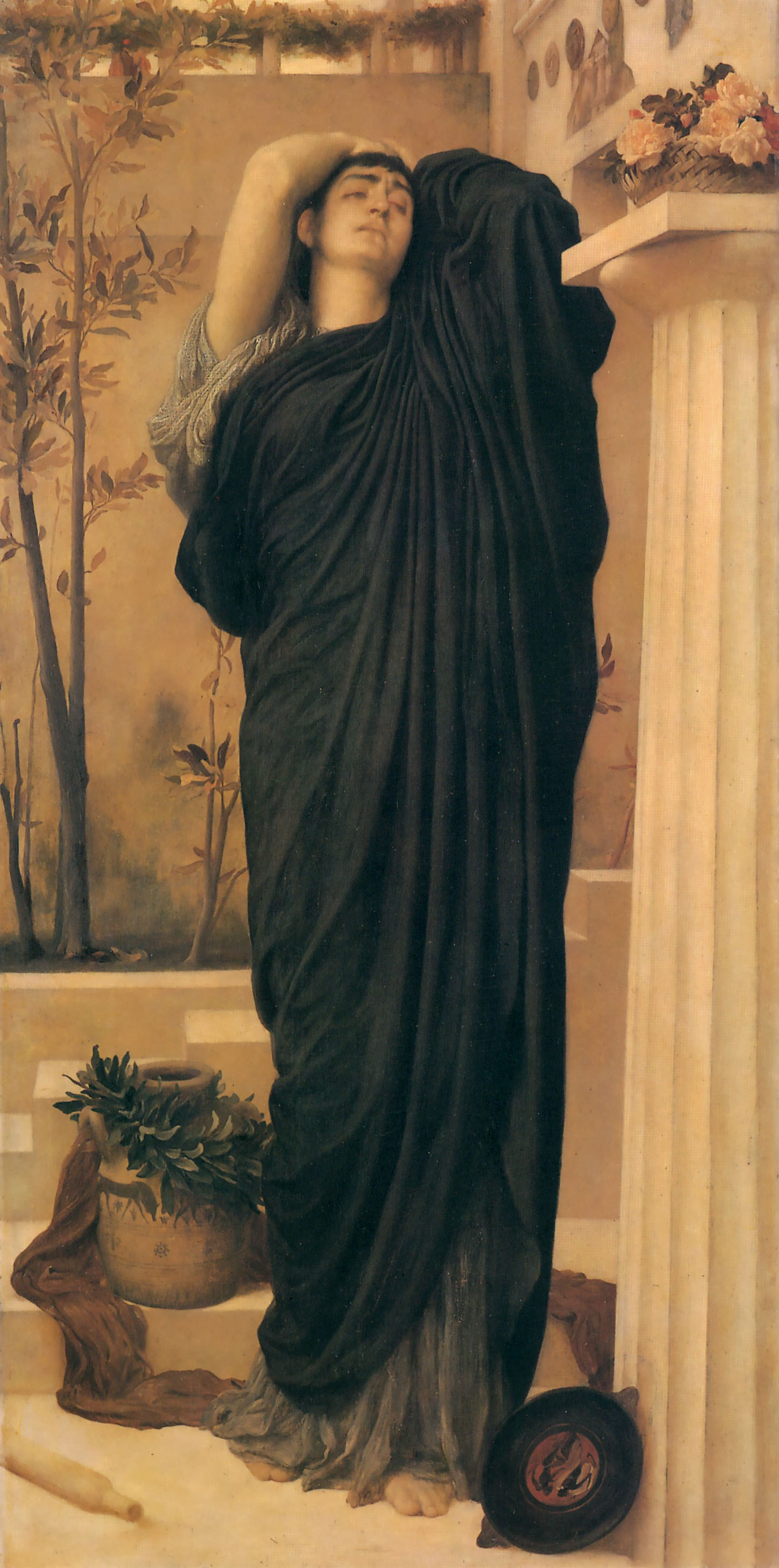
Frederic Leighton, Electra at the Tomb of Agamemnon 1869

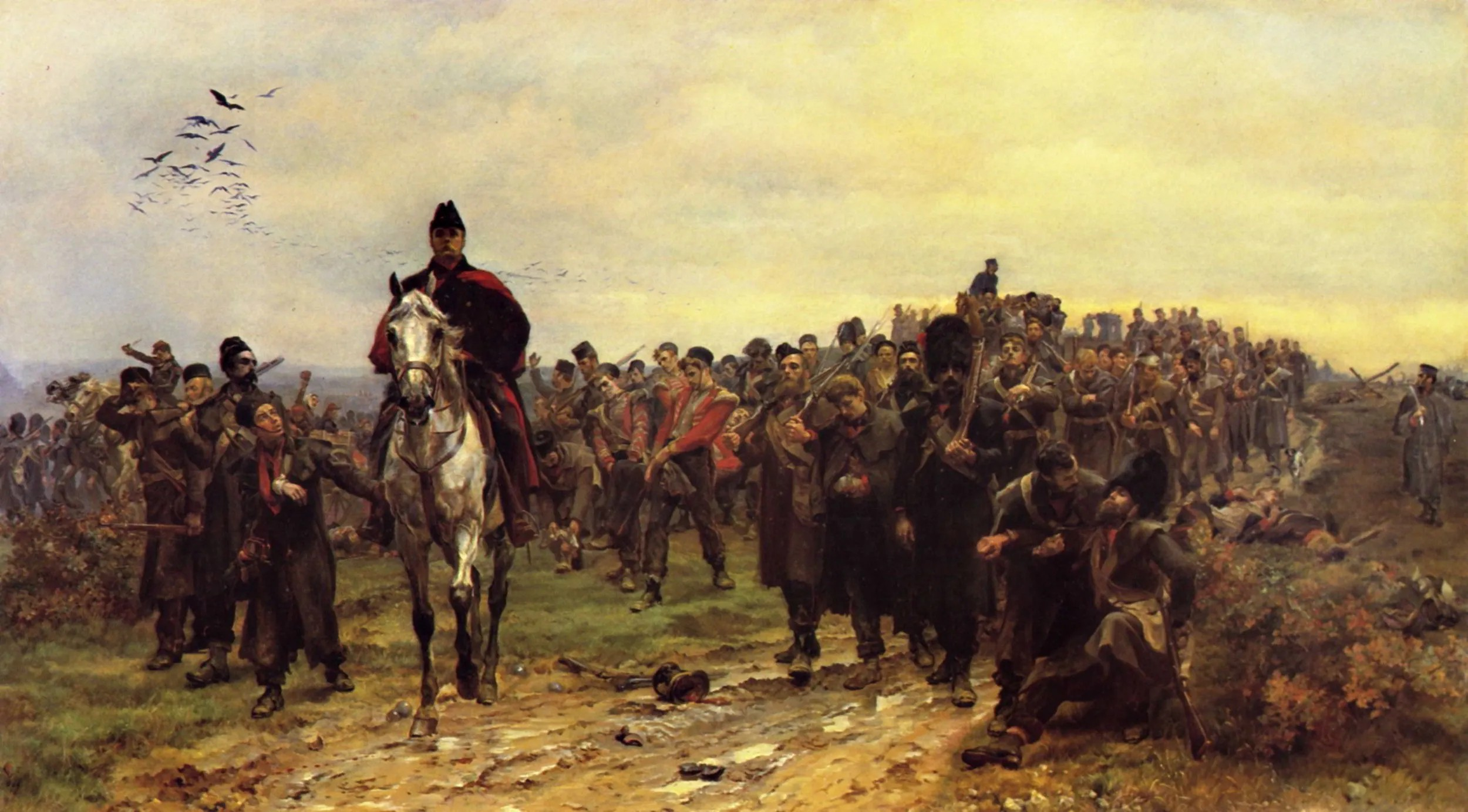
Elizabeth Thompson, The Return from Inkerman (1877)

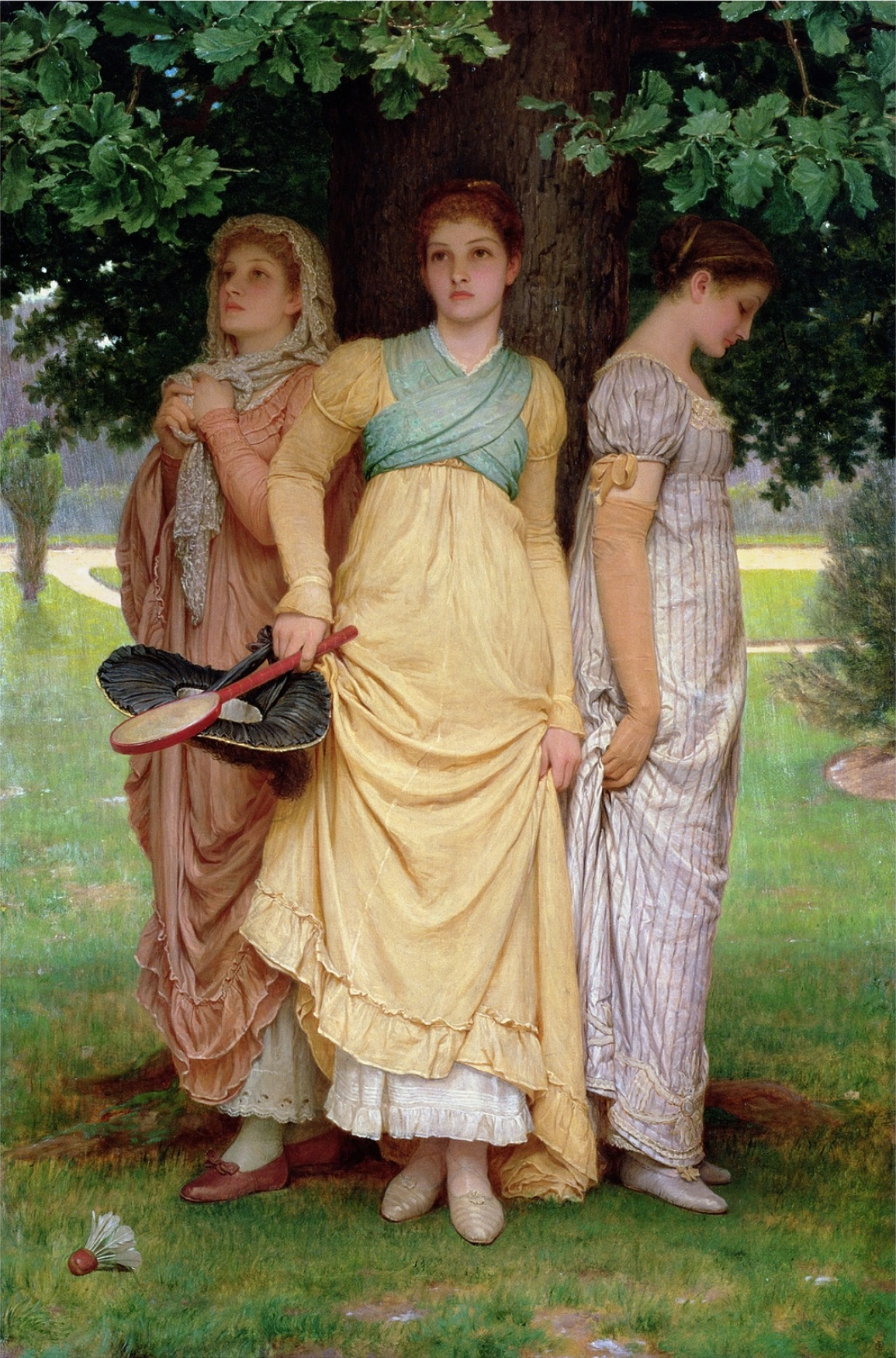
Charles Edward Perugini, A Summer Shower c. 1888

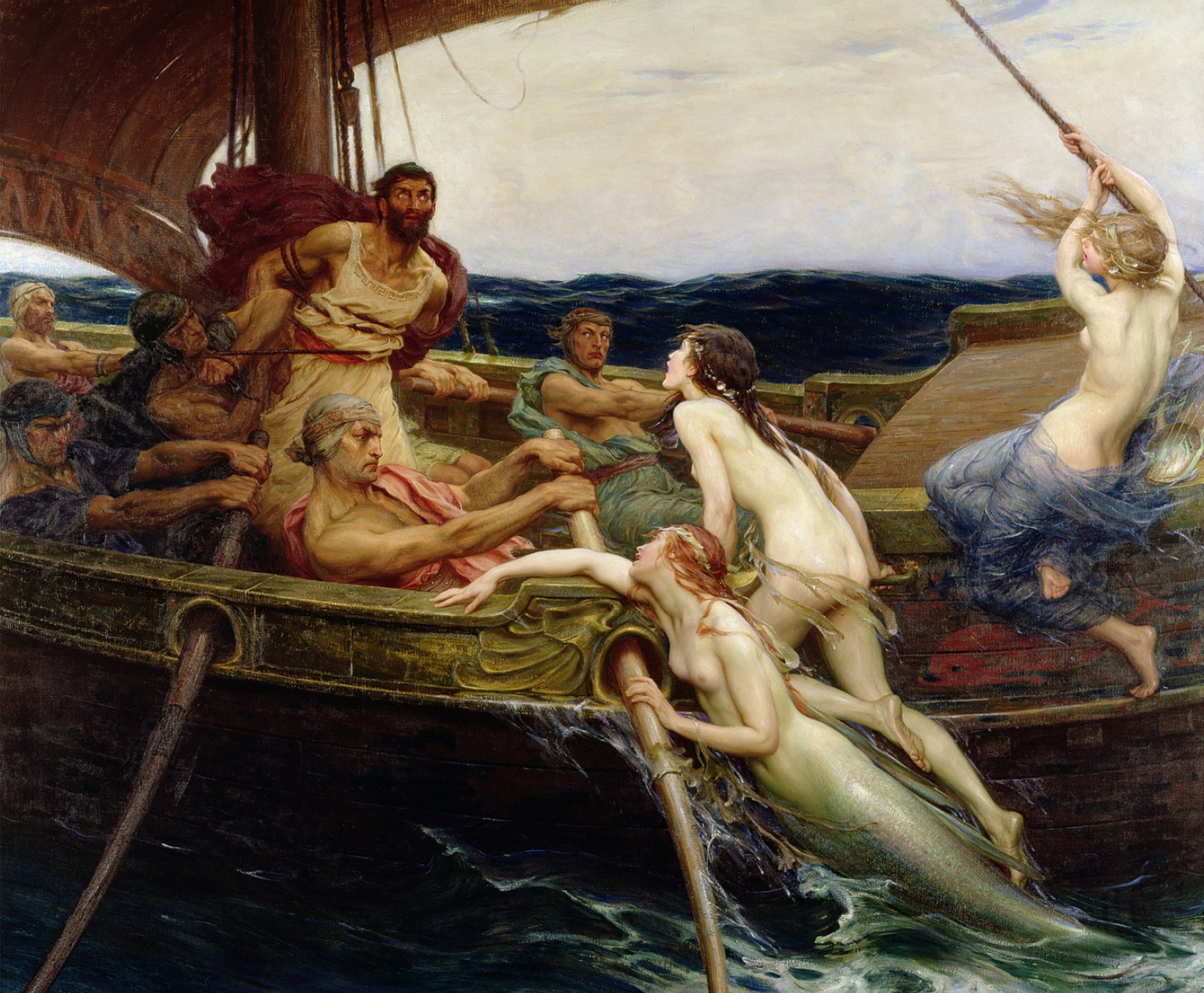
Herbert James Draper, Ulysses and the Sirens c. 1909

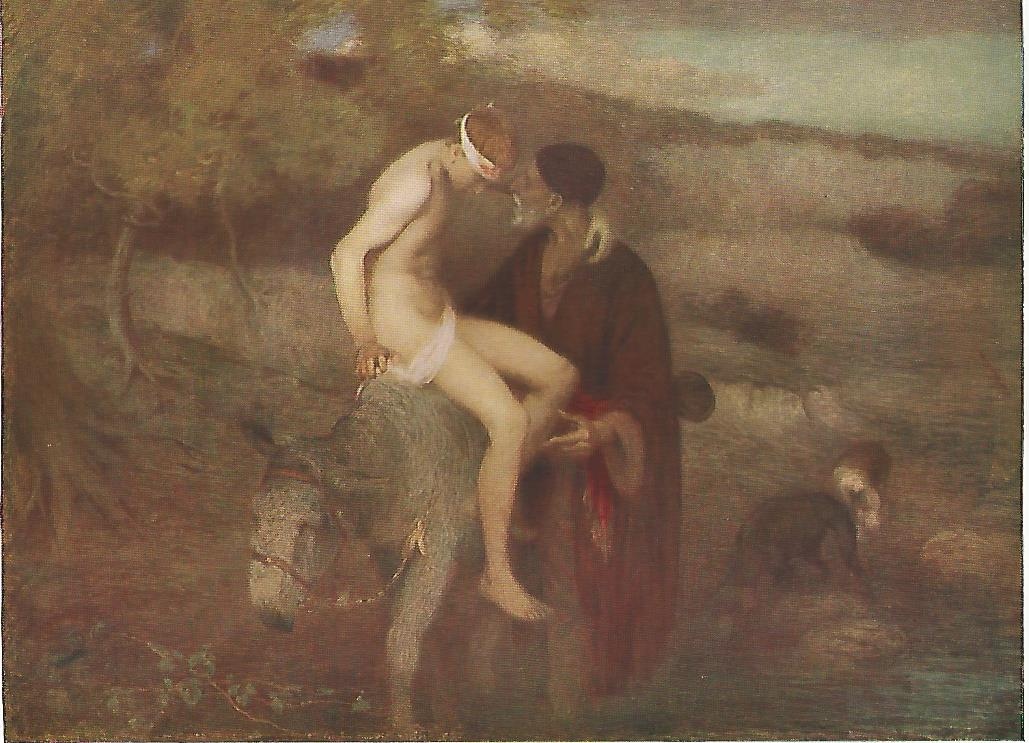
Edward Stott: Good Samaritan (1910)

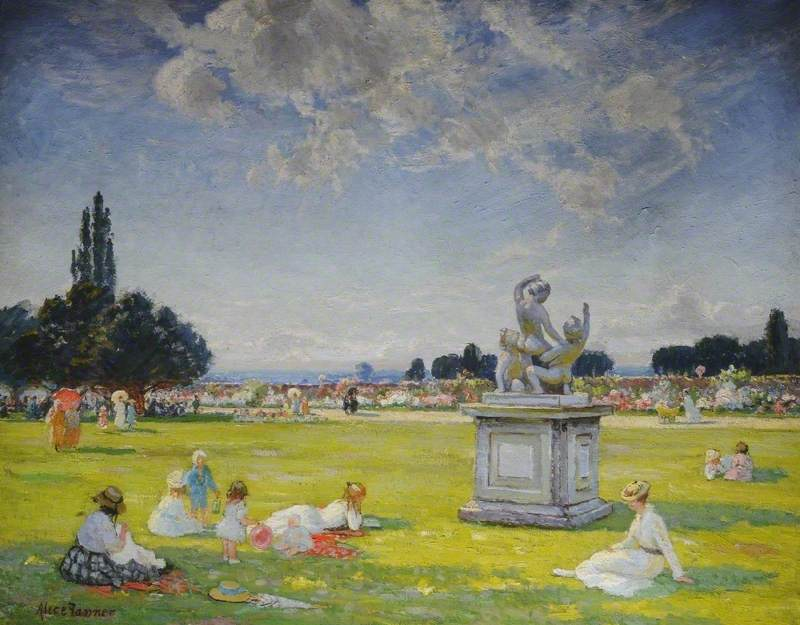
Alice Maud Fanner, Summer at Hampton Court, Oil on canvas (1898)

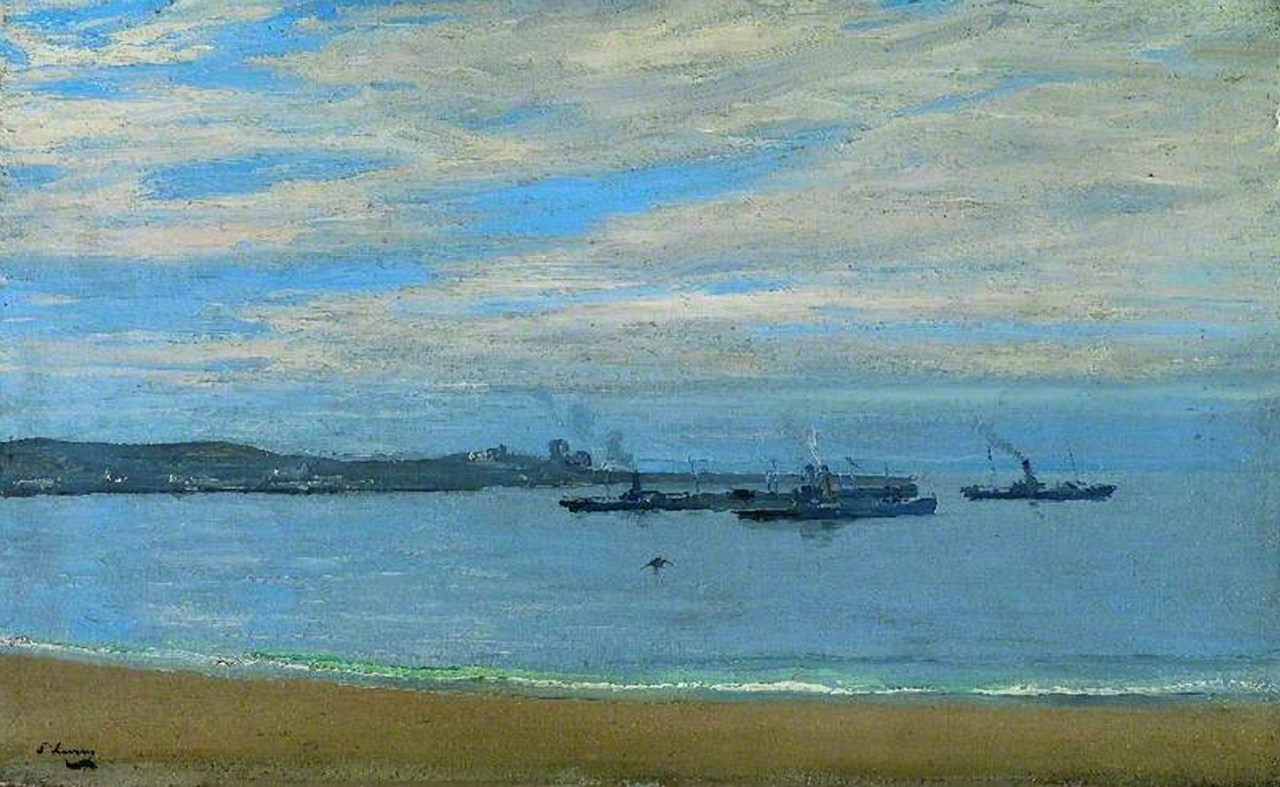
John Lavery; A Still Morning (1917)

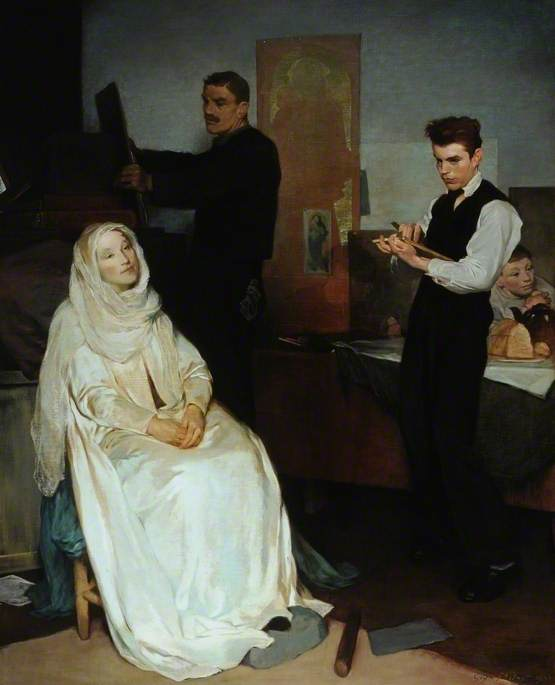
Glyn Philpot: An Artist and The Rice Family (1920)

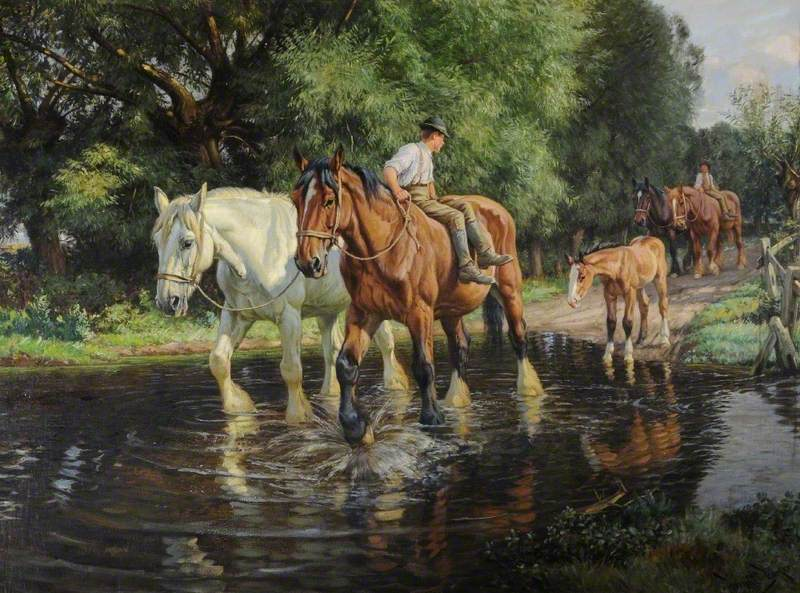
Wright Barker: Farm Horses and a Foal at a Ford (c. 1915)
