= Bruno Bürki =

Swiss pastor and academic (1931–2025)

Bruno Bürki (1931 – 11 October 2025) was a Swiss academic and pastor of the Church of Neuchâtel. He was born in Bern in 1931. Bürki was Titular Professor at the University of Fribourg. He died on 11 October 2025, at the age of 94.
