= Society of the Holy Trinity =

The Society of the Holy Trinity (Societas Trinitatis Sanctae or STS) is an Evangelical-Catholic Lutheran ministerium dedicated to the renewal of Lutheran churches and ministry. The society was founded in 1997 by 28 pastors. As of April 2015, 283 pastors are subscribed to the Rule of the Society.

== Beginnings ==
The Society of the Holy Trinity was founded in response to the theological climate in the formative years of the Evangelical Lutheran Church in America (ELCA). A primary concern among those who would become founders of the society was language for God: specifically, the triune name of "Father, Son, and Holy Spirit." Efforts during and immediately after the formation of the ELCA to introduce gender-neutral Trinitarian formulae in the rite of Baptism and other liturgical rites failed to gain official acceptance; however, the determination of those who demanded the change, and their entrenchment in positions of power in the new denomination, was highly alarming to those who would eventually become founders of the Society. In response to this and other theological issues, a group of pastors developed the "9.5 Theses" and published them for discussion in the ELCA. Over 700 pastors and 300 laypeople signed the document, but the leaders of the denomination refused to give a public hearing to the "9.5 Theses". This refusal to acknowledge the existence of the issues led to the formation of the Society, conceived as an oratory in which pastors would support each other in being faithful to the vows made at ordination.

From its beginning, the society has been an inter-Lutheran ministerium. Membership is open to both male and female pastors from any Lutheran church body.

== Rule ==
A Lutheran pastor becomes a member by publicly subscribing to the Rule at the annual general retreat, usually held in the early fall of each year. Pastors are challenged to remain faithful to their ordination vows by continual deepening of formation in: prayer (Chapters I and V), Christian life as duty and example (Chapter II), collegiality (Chapters III and IV), and study (Chapter VI). In addition, the rule outlines a faithful pastoral practice seeking to renew Lutheran congregational life along catholic and confessional lines. Among the trajectories for renewal are a recovery of the public prayer of the divine office or canonical hours (Chapter I), and worship practice according to scriptural, creedal, and confessional standards, including the restoration of the practice of voluntary private confession and absolution in Lutheran congregations (Chapter VII). Finally, the Rule commits members to pursuing the cause of Lutheran unity as well as the unity of the Western Church (Chapter VIII).

== Governance ==
Chapter IX of the Rule outlines the governance of the Society. The entire Society is under the pastoral direction of a senior, who appoints a vicar. The senior convenes the Society once a year in a general retreat, with local chapters meeting at least three other times during the year under the direction of a chapter dean. Both the senior, at general retreats, and the deans, at chapter retreats, are elected for three-year terms by a "pure ecclesiastical ballot." Any member of the Society may receive votes on any ballot. Successive ballots are taken until consensus is reached. A vicar, secretary, and editor are appointed by the senior. A bursar is elected by majority vote.

On September 23, 2015, The Rev. Patrick J. Rooney was elected for a three-year term as Senior of the Society of the Holy Trinity. He is the third Senior in the history of the Society. Former seniors of the society include The Rev. Phillip Max Johnson and The Rev. Dr. Frank Senn.

== Pastoral statements ==
In 2008 the society received two statements of its leadership council by consensus at its general retreat. These statements give pastoral guidance to members concerning "Language in Worship" (in response to new worship resources developed by American Lutheran denominations) and "Same-Sex Unions" (anticipating the 2009 ELCA Churchwide Assembly which voted to allow congregations, synods, and churchwide units to decide for themselves whether to call those in committed same-sex relationships to rostered leadership).
