= Societas Liturgica =

Societas Liturgica is the international ecumenical society for the study of Christian liturgy and worship. Societas Liturgica has around 300 members who are researchers, academics or practitioners. Anglican members of Societas Liturgica also serve as members of the International Anglican Liturgical Consultation.

== History ==
Societas Liturgica came into existence through the initiative of Wiebe Vos, a pastor of the Dutch Reformed Church. In 1962 he founded Studia Liturgica, "an international ecumenical quarterly for liturgical research and renewal". In 1965 Vos called a conference of twenty-five liturgists from Europe and North America at the Protestant community of Grandchamp, in Neuchâtel, Switzerland.

== Presidents ==
The presidents of Societas Liturgica are each elected for a two-year term of office.

Dates	Name	Nationality	Denomination
1967-69	Placid Murray	Ireland	Roman Catholic
1969-71	Ronald Jasper	UK	Anglican
1971-73	Pierre-Marie Gy	France	Roman Catholic
1973-75	Jean-Jacques von Allmen	Switzerland	Reformed
1975-77	Balthasar Fischer	Germany	Roman Catholic
1977-79	Thomas Talley	USA	Anglican
1979-81	Frederick R. McManus	USA	Roman Catholic
1981-83	Hans-Christoph Schmidt-Lauber	Austria	Lutheran
1983-85	Geoffrey Wainright	USA / UK	Methodist
1985-87	Robert F. Taft	USA	Roman Catholic (Byzantine Rite)
1987-89	Donald C. Gray	UK	Anglican
1989-91	Paul De Clerck	Belgium	Roman Catholic
1991-93	Bruno Bürki	Switzerland	Reformed
1993-95	Paul F. Bradshaw	UK / USA	Anglican
1995-97	Irmgard Pahl	Germany	Roman Catholic
1997-99	Jacob Vellian	India	Syrio-Malabar
1999-2001	John Baldovin	USA	Roman Catholic
2001-03	Yngvill Martola	Finland	Lutheran
2003-05	Ottfried Jordahn	Germany	Lutheran
2005-07	David Holeton	Czech Republic	Anglican
2007-09	James Puglisi	USA	Roman Catholic
2009-11	Karen B. Westerfield Tucker	USA	Methodist
2011-13	Gordon Lathrop	USA	Lutheran
2013-15	Lizette Larson-Miller	USA	Anglican
2015-17	Martin Stuflessor	Germany	Roman Catholic
2017-19	Joris Geldorf	Belgium	Roman Catholic
2019-21	Bridget Nichols	Ireland	Anglican
2021-23	E. Byron (Ron) Anderson	USA	Methodist
2023-25	Gilles Druin	France	Roman Catholic
2025-27	Harald Buchinger	Austria	Roman Catholic

== Congress ==
There are full meetings of Societas Liturgica, known as Congresses, every two years. A selection of the papers from each congress is subsequently published in English in the journal Studia Liturgica; in French in the journal La Maison Dieu; and also in German.

List of congresses
Year	Location	Theme
1967	Driebergen	The liturgical constitution of the Second Vatican Council and the elaboration on worship of the World Council of Churches 1969
1969	Murroe	Liturgical Language
1971	Strasbourg	Contemporary Worship
1973	Montserrat Abbey	Prayer Today
1975	Trier	Eucharistic Prayers
1977	Canterbury	Christian Initiation
1979	Washington DC	Ordination Rites
1981	Paris	Liturgical Time
1983	Vienna	Liturgy and Spirituality
1985	Boston	The Lima Text
1987	Brixen	Repentance and reconciliation
1989	York	Liturgical Inculturation
1991	Toronto	The Bible and Worship
1993	Friburg	Liturgical Space
1995	Dublin	The Future forms of the Liturgy
1997	Turku	Liturgy and Music
1999	Kottayam	Liturgical Theology
2001	Santa Clara	
2003	Eindhoven	The Cloud of Witnesses
2005	Dresden	Worship as Transformation - "To Heal a Broken World"
2007	Palermo	Liturgy and the Public Square
2009	Sydney	The Liturgical Year: the Gospel encountering our time
2011	Reims	Baptism: Rites and Christian Life
2013	Würzburg	Liturgical Reform in the Churches
2015	Quebec	Liturgical Formation: traditional task and new challenge
2017	Leuven	Symbol of what we are: Liturgical Perspectives on the question of Sacramentality.
2019	Durham, UK	Anamnesis: Remembering in Action, Place and Time
2021	Online	Liturgy and the Arts
2023	Maynooth, IRL	Liturgy and Ecumenism
2025	Paris	The Liturgical Assembly in its Spaces
2027	Rio de Janeiro, Brazil	From Inculturation to Decoloniality

== Notable members ==
- Bruno Bürki
- Paul F. Bradshaw
- Ronald Jasper
- Dom Placid Murray
- Louis Weil
