= Judith Maltby =

Historian and Anglican priest

The Reverend Canon Judith Maltby FRHistS
- Born: 14 October 1957 (age 68); United States

Ecclesiastical career
- Religion: Christianity (Anglican)
- Church: Church of England
- Ordained: 1992 (deacon); 1994 (priest)

Academic background
- Education: University of Illinois; Wolfson College, Cambridge; Newnham College, Cambridge
- Thesis: Approaches to the Study of Religious Conformity in Late Elizabethan and Early Stuart England (1992)

Academic work
- Discipline: History
- Sub-discipline: Early modern British history; ecclesiastical history
- Institutions: Salisbury and Wells Theological College; Corpus Christi College, Oxford

Judith Diane Maltby FRHistS (born 1957) is an American-born Anglican priest and historian, who specialises in post-Reformation church history and the history of early modern Britain. She has been the chaplain and a Fellow of Corpus Christi College, Oxford, since 1993, and reader in church history at the University of Oxford since 2004.

== Early life and education ==
Maltby was born on 14 October 1957 in the United States. She studied for a double major in English and history at the University of Illinois, graduating in 1979 with a Bachelor of Arts (BA) degree. She undertook postgraduate research in early modern British history at Wolfson College, Cambridge, and then at Newnham College, Cambridge, completing her Doctor of Philosophy (PhD) degree in 1992. Her doctoral thesis was titled Approaches to the Study of Religious Conformity in Late Elizabethan and Early Stuart England: With Special Reference to Cheshire and the Diocese of Lincoln.

== Career ==
=== Academic career ===
From 1987 to 1993, Maltby was a tutor in church history at Salisbury and Wells Theological College, an Anglican theological college in Salisbury, Wiltshire, England. In 1993, having been appointed its college chaplain, she was elected a Fellow of Corpus Christi College, Oxford. She is also a member of the Faculty of Theology and Religion, University of Oxford, and was made reader in church history in 2004.

Maltby's main research interests are church history and the history of early modern Britain. Particular interests include "16th and 17th century English religion", "liturgy and the history of the Church of England", ecumenism, and "Anglican responses to persecution during the 1640–50s".

In 1999, Maltby was elected a Fellow of the Royal Historical Society (FRHistS).

=== Ordained ministry ===
From 1989 to 1992, Maltby trained for Holy Orders on the Southern Theological Education and Training Scheme. She was ordained in the Church of England as a deacon in 1992. From 1992 to 1993, she was an honorary parish deacon at the Parish of Wilton with Netherhampton & Fugglestone in the Diocese of Salisbury. She was ordained as a priest on 17 April 1994 by Richard Harries, Bishop of Oxford, and was thus among the first women ordained to the priesthood in the Church of England.

From 1993 until she retired in 2023, Maltby was the chaplain of Corpus Christi College, Oxford. She was also been honorary canon theologian of Leicester Cathedral from 2004 to 2023, and canon theologian of Winchester Cathedral from 2011 to 2018. In 2006, she was made an honorary canon of Christ Church Cathedral, Oxford.

=== Views ===
Maltby opposed the creation of provincial episcopal visitors for opponents of the ordination of women.

== Selected works ==
- Maltby, Judith D., ed. (1988). The Short Parliament (1640) Diary of Sir Thomas Aston. London: Royal Historical Society. ISBN 9780861931163.
- Judith Maltby (2000). Prayer Book and People in Elizabethan and Early Stuart England. Cambridge: Cambridge University Press. ISBN 978-0-521-79387-2.
- Durston, Christopher; Maltby, Judith, eds. (2006). Religion in Revolutionary England. Manchester: Manchester University Press. ISBN 978-0719064043.
- Mark Chapman; Judith Maltby; William Whyte, eds. (2011). Established Church: Past, Present and Future. London: A & C Black. ISBN 978-0-567-35809-7.
- Maltby, Judith; Shell, Alison, eds. (2019). Anglican women novelists: Charlotte Brontë to P.D. James. London; New York: T&T Clark. ISBN 978-0567665850.

== See also ==
- Women and the Church
