= Frank Senn =

American theologian

Frank Colvin Senn STS (born 1943) is an American liturgist and pastor of the Evangelical Lutheran Church in America. He served as pastor of five congregations: Gloria Dei in South Bend, Indiana (assistant pastor 1969–75), Fenner Memorial in Louisville, Kentucky (1975–77), Christ the Mediator in Chicago, Illinois (1981–86), Holy Spirit in Lincolnshire, Illinois (1986–90), and Immanuel in Evanston, Illinois (1990 to 2013).

Senn also taught at the Lutheran School of Theology at Chicago (1978–81). He has been an adjunct or visiting professor at the University of Chicago Divinity School (1982–84), the University of Notre Dame, Concordia University Chicago, Garrett-Evangelical Theological Seminary, Trinity Theological College in Singapore, Satya Wacana Christian University in Central Java, Indonesia, Trinity School for Ministry, and Carey Theological College in Vancouver, and Reformed Theological Seminary of Indonesia in Jakarta.

Senn has a B.A. in music from Hartwick College, Oneonta, New York, a M.Div. from the Lutheran School of Theology at Chicago, and a Ph.D. in liturgical studies from the University of Notre Dame. His work centers on the history and renewal of Christian liturgy and ecumenicism. Early in his career he served on several Lutheran liturgical committees and contributed to the work on the Lutheran Book of Worship (1978). He was especially active in Lutheran-Episcopal Dialogue in the U.S.A. Senn is a past president of the North American Academy of Liturgy, a past president of The Liturgical Conference, and the past Senior of the Society of the Holy Trinity.

As of 2017, Senn has authored sixteen books. His magnum opus is Christian Liturgy---Catholic and Evangelical (1997), which is a history of Christian liturgy whose center of gravity is the Reformation period. He has been especially interested in liturgy and culture and liturgy in social history. His most recent project in 2016, Embodied Liturgy: Lessons in Christian Ritual, grew out of a course he taught in Indonesia and focuses on the use of the body in liturgy and worship. Eucharistic Body (2017) continues this project by exploring the connections between the historical body of Christ, the sacramental body of Christ, the body of the communicant, and the social body of Christ. Senn has also published more than 300 journal articles, book reviews, sermons, dictionary entries, encyclopedia articles, and opinion pieces.

Frank Senn is married to Mary Elizabeth Senn, a clinical social worker. They have three married adult children: Andrew, Nicholas, and Emily. In retirement Pastor Senn continues to write, teach, and practice yoga.

== Works ==
- The Pastor as Worship Leader, Augsburg, 1977. ISBN 0-8066-1593-1
- Christian Worship and Its Cultural Setting, Fortress, 1982.
- (Editor) Protestant Spiritual Traditions, Paulist Press, 1985.
- (Editor) New Eucharistic Prayers, Paulist Press, 1987. ISBN 0-8091-2912-4
- The Witness of the Worshiping Community: Liturgy and the Practice of Evangelism, Paulist Press, 1993. ISBN 0-8091-3368-7
- (Co-author with Mark Olson and Jann Fullenwieder) How Does Worship Evangelize?, Augsburg Fortress, 1995.
- Braaten, Carl E.; Jenson, Robert W., eds. (1996). The Catholicity of the Reformation. William B Eerdmans. ISBN 978-0802842206. Contributor.
- Christian Liturgy: Catholic and Evangelical, Fortress Press, 1997. ISBN 0-8006-2726-1
- New Proclamation: Year B, 1999–2000, Fortress Press, 1999–2000. ISBN 0-8006-4241-4
- A Stewardship of the Mysteries, Paulist Press, 1999. ISBN 0-8091-3821-2
- New Creation: A Liturgical World View, Augsburg, 2000. ISBN 0-8006-3235-4
- The People's Work: A Social History of the Liturgy. Fortress Press, 2006. ISBN 0-8006-3827-1
- Lutheran Identity: A Classical Understanding. Augsburg Fortress, 2008. ISBN 0-8066-8010-5
- Introduction to Christian Liturgy (Fortress Press, 2012). ISBN 9780800698850
- Embodied Liturgy: Lessons in Christian Ritual (Fortress Press, 2016). ISBN 978-1-4514-9627-7
- Eucharistic Body (Fortress Press, 2017). ISBN 978-1-5064-1676-2
- (Editor) Protestant Spiritual Traditions, Volume 2 (Wipf and Stock, 2020). ISBN 978-1-5326-9829-3
