= Texas Annual Conference =

The Texas Annual Conference of the United Methodist Church is the regional body of congregations and ministries in East Texas, from Texarkana west to approximately Cedar Creek Lake in the north, Thorndale in the west, and Bay City in the southwest and down to the Gulf Coast and back east to the Louisiana border. It is headquartered in Houston, Texas with Bishop Cynthia Fierro Harvey currently serving as the presiding Bishop. The Texas Annual Conference is also unofficially referred to as "the Houston Area of The United Methodist Church". The Texas Annual Conference is the largest Annual Conference in the Church's South Central Jurisdiction and the third largest in the United Methodist denomination.

The Texas Annual Conference was the original Annual Conference in Texas, which now contains 6 Annual Conferences that were carved out of the original Texas Conference. The State of Texas now has 5 geographical and 1 Spanish language conference. The jurisdiction of the Spanish language Conference, the Rio Grande Conference, covers the entire State of Texas and portions of New Mexico. The Texas Annual Conference contains roughly 598 churches, 8 Wesley Foundations, 1 higher education institution and many other ministries and outreaches.

== Districts of the Texas Annual Conference ==
The Texas Conference is divided into 5 districts that cover subdivided areas of the conference territory. Districts are the United Methodist equivalent of a Roman Catholic diocese. McMahan Chapel, the oldest Protestant church in Texas and one of the oldest Protestant congregations west of the Mississippi River, is located in the Eastern District and is celebrated each year with an annual Conference wide worship service and gathering, McMahon Chapel Day . The original Methodist missionary to what was then the Mexican territory of Texas, the Rev. Littleton Fowler, is buried under the pulpit of McMahon's Chapel. The Rev. Sumner Bacon, the first Presbyterian missionary to Texas, is buried in the nearby Chapel Hill United Methodist Church cemetery.

District Superintendents (commonly referred to as a "DS") supervise each district. The superintendents serve for six years but they can serve for as long as eight if the presiding Bishop feels that there are exceptional reasons to do so. A superintendent may serve up to 12 years in total during the course of their ministry, and there are no exceptions allowed to this rule. Each of the five districts coordinate, supervise, and support all of the work of the Church within its geographical boundaries. The West District in the Texas Annual Conference is currently the highest apportionment paying District in the entire United Methodist denomination. The southern and eastern districts of the Annual Conference were deeply affected by the damage of Hurricane Ike in the Fall of 2008, with several coastal congregations being wiped out completely.
