= Richard Lischer =

American preacher

Richard Alan Lischer (born November 12, 1943, in St. Louis, Missouri) is an American author, memoirist, preacher, practical theologian, and professor emeritus at Duke Divinity School.

== Duke Divinity School ==
After serving as a Lutheran pastor for nine years, Lischer joined the faculty of Duke Divinity School in 1979. He has been interviewed on topics ranging from church liturgy to death, commenting frequently in the New York Times. He has participated in multiple NPR interviews, and in 2010 was a part of the PBS documentary "God in America," where he provides background for the episode on the leadership of Martin Luther King, Jr. during the civil rights movement. He has also explored the interactions of preaching, politics, and literature, notably at Yale Divinity School in his Lyman Beecher Lectures on preaching and reconciliation, as well as in a prize-winning study of Martin Luther King, Jr., The Preacher King: Martin Luther King, Jr. and the Word that Moved America, for which he was interviewed by Duke News in 2011. He was one of two keynote speakers at the first international symposium on homiletics held at Heidelberg University. In the classroom, he draws both on the church’s long tradition as well as the experience of contemporary preachers as resources for parish ministry. In 2000, he inaugurated Duke Divinity School’s first chair in preaching. Lischer has preached all over the world, most notably at the Washington National Cathedral, and regularly at Duke University Chapel. He is a former president of the Academy of Homiletics and the recipient of the Academy’s Lifetime Achievement Award.

== Memoir ==
Although both a pastor and an academic, it is Lischer's recent memoir work that has received the most public attention. His first memoir is the story of his early ministry, Open Secrets: A Memoir of Faith and Discovery, and is set in middle-America in the early 1970s. It evokes the hidden dramas in a small country church and traces the painful learning curve of its inexperienced minister. Following the book’s publication in 2001, Lischer began a program of research and teaching in spiritual autobiography that has increasingly occupied the latter phases of his career. A second memoir, Stations of the Heart: Parting with a Son, commemorates his son, Adam, who died of cancer in 2005, for which Lischer received attention in national and regional press. His most recent book Our Hearts Are Restless: The Art of Spiritual Memoir was published in 2022 by Oxford University Press.

== Personal life ==
Lischer graduated from Concordia Senior College in Fort Wayne, IN in 1965, and then from Washington University in St. Louis in 1967 with an MA in English. He earned the Bachelor of Divinity at Concordia Seminary in St. Louis in 1969. His Ph.D. (Theology) came from King's College London, in 1972. He is married to Tracy Kenyon Lischer, a lawyer in Durham, North Carolina.

== Publications ==
Lischer has published more than a dozen books, including The Company of Preachers: Wisdom on Preaching from Augustine to the Present, which was awarded "Best Book in Ministry/Leadership" by Christianity Today. He is also regularly published in The Christian Century and his essays and opinion pieces have appeared in the Washington Post, the Wall Street Journal, the Atlanta Journal Constitution, the Sydney Morning Herald, the Raleigh News and Observer, and the Durham (NC) Herald.

In 2016, a Festschrift was published in his honor. Preaching Gospel: Essays in Honor of Richard Lischer included contributions from Ellen F. Davis, Stanley Hauerwas, and Richard B. Hays.
