= Jeremy Begbie =

British theologian

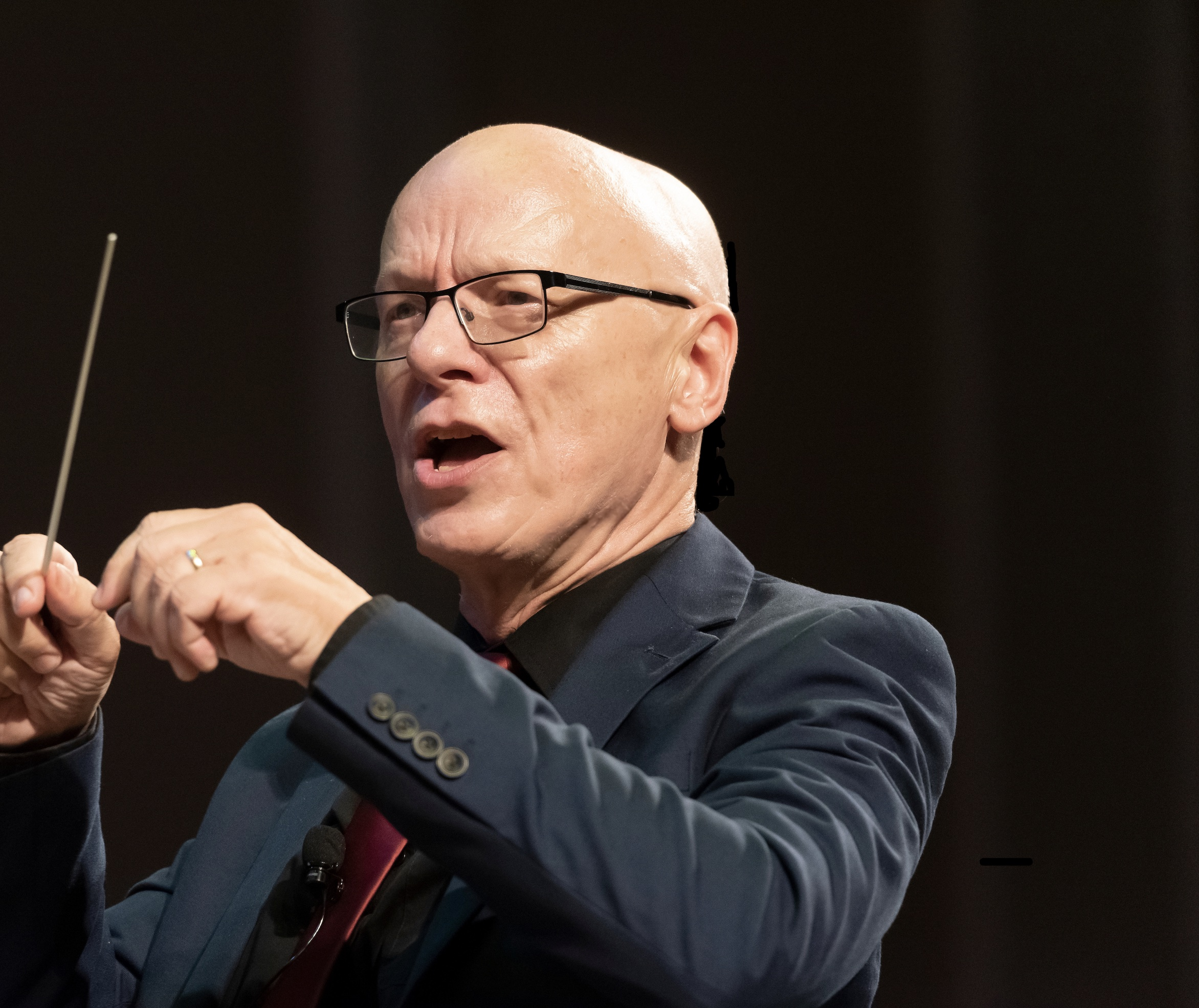
- Jeremy Begbie conducting the New Caritas Orchestra, September 2022
- Born: Jeremy Sutherland Begbie; 15 June 1957 (age 69)

Ecclesiastical career
- Religion: Christianity (Anglican)
- Church: Church of England
- Ordained: 1983 (priest)

Academic background
- Education: University of Edinburgh; University of Aberdeen
- Doctoral advisor: J. B. Torrance

Academic work
- Discipline: Theology
- Sub-discipline: Systematic theology; theological aesthetics
- Institutions: Ridley Hall, Cambridge; University of St Andrews; Duke University
- Main interests: Music and theology
- Website: jeremybegbie.com

Jeremy Sutherland Begbie, DD, BA, BD, PhD, LRAM, ARCM, FRSCM, is Thomas A. Langford Distinguished Research Professor of Theology at Duke Divinity School, Duke University, where he is the McDonald Agape Director of Duke Initiatives in Theology and the Arts. He is a systematic theologian whose primary research interest is the correlation between theology and the arts, in particular the interplay between music and theology. He is also an Affiliated Lecturer in the Faculty of Music at the University of Cambridge, and Fellow Commoner of Magdalene College, Cambridge.

== Biography ==
Begbie was born on 15 June 1957. He obtained a Bachelor of Arts degree in philosophy and music at the University of Edinburgh and Bachelor of Divinity and Doctor of Philosophy degrees at the University of Aberdeen.

He was ordained priest in the Church of England in 1983, and served as a Curate in the Diocese of Guildford. Prior to teaching at Duke Divinity School, he was the Associate Principal of Ridley Hall, Cambridge, as well as an Affiliated Lecturer in the Faculty of Divinity, University of Cambridge. From 2000, he was an Honorary Professor at the Institute for Theology, Imagination, and the Arts at St Mary's College, University of St Andrews, in Scotland. He was co-founder and Associate Director of the Institute. In 2009 he was appointed Thomas A. Langford Research Professor of Theology at Duke University. He is a Senior Member of Wolfson College, Cambridge and Fellow Commoner of Magdalene College, Cambridge.

Being a professionally trained musician, he has performed as a pianist, oboist, and a conductor. He is founder of the New Caritas Orchestra, a group of professional players of faith in the United States.

Begbie has lectured worldwide, delivering multi-media presentations in venues all over the UK, as well as in the USA, Canada, Hong Kong, Belgium, Germany, Israel, South Africa, Japan, New Zealand, and Australia.

In June 2024, he was awarded the honorary degree of DD by the University of Aberdeen.

The New Testament scholar, N T Wright, has written: “Jeremy Begbie is a musician/theologian par excellence. Whatever music you enjoy and wherever you are on the journey of faith, he will delight, surprise, challenge, and inspire you.”

== Research ==
Jeremy Begbie is known for his writing and lecturing in theology and the arts, especially music.

In September 1997 he founded the Theology Through the Arts project at the University of Cambridge, whose primary aim was "to discover and demonstrate ways in which the arts can contribute towards the renewal of Christian theology". The project included conversation among artists and theologians, academic lectures, publications, and an international arts festival held in Cambridge in 2000.

As the Thomas A. Langford Research Professor of Theology at Duke Divinity School, he founded Duke Initiatives in Theology and the Arts (DITA), a project which "promotes and supports the vibrant interplay between Christian theology and the arts by encouraging transformative leadership and enriching theological discussion in the Church, academy, and society."

For his book, Resounding Truth: Christian Wisdom in the World of Music, Begbie won the 2008 Christianity Today Book Award in the theology/ethics category.

== Publications ==
=== Books ===
- Voicing Creation's Praise: Towards A Theology of the Arts, T&T Clark, 1991. ISBN 9780567291882
- Beholding the Glory: Incarnation Through the Arts (ed.), DLT/Baker Books, 2000. ISBN 9780801022449
- Theology, Music and Time, Cambridge University Press, 2000. ISBN 9780521785686
- Sounding the Depths: Theology Through the Arts (ed.), SCM Press, 2002. ISBN 9780334028703
- Resounding Truth: Christian Wisdom in the World of Music, Baker Academic, 2007. ISBN 9780801026959
- Resonant Witness: Conversations Between Theology and Music (co ed.), Eerdmans/The Calvin Institute of Christian Worship Liturgical Studies, 2011. ISBN 9780802862778
- Art, Imagination and Christian Hope: Patterns of Promise (co ed.), (Routledge Studies in Theology, Imagination and the Arts), Ashgate, 2012. ISBN 9781138250680
- Music, Modernity, and God: Essays in Listening, Oxford University Press, 2013. ISBN 9780198745037
- Redeeming Transcendence: Bearing Witness to the Triune God, Eerdmans, 2018. ISBN 9780802874948
- A Peculiar Orthodoxy: Reflections on Theology and the Arts, Baker Academic, 2018. ISBN 9780801099571
- Theology, Music, and Modernity: Struggles for Freedom, (co ed.), Oxford University Press, 2021. ISBN 9780198846550
- The Art of New Creation: Trajectories in Theology and the Arts (co ed.), IVP Academic, 2021. ISBN 9781514003268
- Abundantly More: The Theological Promise of the Arts in a Reductionist World, Baker Academic, 2023. ISBN 9781540965431

=== Selected articles ===
- "Who Is This God?--Biblical Inspiration Revisited.” Tyndale Bulletin 43, 2 (November 1992): 259-282.
- "The Theological Potential of Music: A Response to Adrienne Dengerink Chaplin.” Christian Scholar's Review 33, 1 (Fall 2003): 135-141.
- “On the Strange Place of Contemporary Art,” article review of On the Strange Place of Religion in Contemporary Art, James Elkins (New York: Routledge, 2004) and God in the Gallery: A Christian Embrace of Modern Art, Daniel Siedell (Grand Rapids, MI: Baker Academic, 2008), in Image Journal, Iss. 64 (December 2009): 105–13.
- “Modelling Harmony: Music, Theology and Peace-Building” in Interpretation: A Journal of Bible and Theology, 71.1 (January 2017)
- “An Awkward Witness in a Worded World: Music and the Reformation” in The Protestant Reformation of the Church and the World, eds. John Witte and Amy Wheeler (Louisville: Kentucky, WJK, 2018), pp. 71–8.
- “Making the Familiar Unfamiliar: Macmillan’s St Luke Passion” in James Macmillan Studies, eds. George Parsons and Robert Sholl (Cambridge: Cambridge University Press, 2020) pp. 111‒128.
- “Scripture in Sound” in Hearing and Doing the Word: The Drama of Evangelical Hermeneutics?, eds. Daniel J. Treier and Douglas A. Sweeney (London: Bloomsbury T&T Clark, 2021), pp. 287–302.
- “Theologie für Bach und Bach für die Theologie,” in Bach unter den Theologen: Themen, Thesen, Temperamente, ed. Ingo Bredenbach, Volker Leppin, und Christoph Schwöbel (Mohr Siebeck, 2022), 227-256.

=== Selected chapters ===
- "Through Music: Sound Mix." In Beholding the Glory: Incarnation Through the Arts, ed. Jeremy Begbie. Grand Rapids: Baker, 2000.
- "Unexplored Eloquencies: Music, Media, Religion and Culture." In Mediating Religion: Conversations in Media, Religion and Culture, eds. Jolyon Mitchell and Sophia Marriage. London: T&T Clark, 2003.
- "Beauty, Sentimentality and the Arts." In The Beauty of God: Theology and the Arts, eds. Daniel J. Treier, Mark Husbands and Roger Lundin. Downers Grove: IVP, 2007.
- "Created Beauty: The Witness of J.S. Bach." In The Beauty of God: Theology and the Arts, eds. Daniel J. Treier, Mark Husbands and Roger Lundin. Downers Grove: IVP, 2007.
- "The Sense of an Ending." In A Place for Truth: Leading Thinkers Explore Life's Hardest Questions, ed. Dallas Willard. Downers Grove: IVP, 2010.
- "The Future: Looking to the Future: A Hopeful Subversion." In For the Beauty of the Church: Casting a Vision for the Arts, ed. W. David O. Taylor. Grand Rapids: Baker, 2010.
- "The Shape of Things to Come?: Wright Amidst Emerging Ecclesiologies." In Jesus, Paul, and the People of God: A Theological Dialogue with N.T. Wright, eds. Nicholas Perrin and Richard B. Hays. Downers Grove: IVP Academic, 2011.
- "Confidence and Anxiety in Elgar's Dream of Gerontius." In Music and Theology in Nineteenth-Century Britain, ed. Martin Clarke. Burlington: Ashgate, 2012.
- ""A Semblance More Lucid"? in An Exploration of Trinitarian Space." In George Westhaver (ed.), A Transforming Vision, London: SCM Press, 2018.
- "“There before Us”: New Creation in Theology and the Arts." In The Art of New Creation: Trajectories in Theology and the Arts, edited by Jeremy Begbie, Daniel Train and W. David O. Taylor, Downers Grove, Illinois: IVP, 2022.
- “Encountering the Uncontainable in the Arts.” In God, Wonder, And the Arts, ed. Jeff Barbeau and Emily Hunter McGowin, (Wheaton Theology Conference, 2022) Eugene OR: Cascade, 2023.
