= Randy Paul Gage =

American author and motivational speaker (born 1959)

- Born: Randy Paul Gage; April 6, 1959 (age 67); Madison, Wisconsin, U.S.
- Occupations: Author, entrepreneur, speaker
- Years active: 1991-present
- Known for: Risky is the New Safe; Mad Genius; Wealth Without Apology
- Website: RandyGage.com

Randy Gage (born April 6, 1959) is an American entrepreneur and author. He is known for books on entrepreneurship, prosperity, and personal development, including Risky Is the New Safe, Mad Genius, Radical Rebirth and Wealth Without Apology. He is a New York Times and Wall Street Journal bestselling author and was inducted into the National Speakers Association's Council of Peers Award for Excellence (CPAE) Speaker Hall of Fame in 2013.

== Early life and education ==
Gage was born in Madison, Wisconsin, and was raised by his mother. As a teenager, he became involved with alcohol and drugs and was expelled from Madison West High School. At the age of 15, he was arrested for armed robbery and spent time in juvenile detention.

Gage has described his early experiences and subsequent financial difficulties as formative influences on his later interest in personal development and prosperity. Since his early twenties he has been an entrepreneur and coached other entrepreneurs. Gage is the founder of Breakthrough U, an entrepreneur accelerator program.

== Career ==
In 1991, Gage founded Prosperity Factory, Inc., a company through which he developed workshops and training materials on prosperity, entrepreneurship, and personal development.. He subsequently built an international speaking career, presenting seminars and lectures on business, wealth, and personal development. The National Speakers Association states that he has spoken to audiences in more than 50 countries and was inducted in the NSA's Council of Peers Award for Excellence (CPAE) Speaker Hall of Fame.

Gage has also worked extensively in the direct selling industry. His early books focused substantially on the profession, including How to Build a Multi-Level Money Machine and Making the First Circle Work. His later work expanded into broader subjects including wealth, entrepreneurship, and critical thinking. His books have been translated into more than 25 languages.

In addition to his books and speaking engagements, Gage is the host of the ''Power Prosperity Podcast.''

== Writing ==
Gage's early books included Prosperity Mind, The 7 Spiritual Laws of Prosperity, and 101 Keys to Your Prosperity. These works developed his approach to prosperity as a combination of financial behavior, personal beliefs, and individual responsibility.

In 2006, he published Why You're Dumb, Sick & Broke...And How to Get Smart, Healthy & Rich!, which examined beliefs and attitudes that he argued could limit financial and personal development.

Risky Is the New Safe, published by John Wiley & Sons in 2012, examined economic change, disruptive technologies, entrepreneurship, and risk-taking. The book became a New York Times bestseller and reached number one on the Wall Street Journal business bestseller list and was selected as the USA Today #1 money book.

In 2016, Gage published Mad Genius, which addressed unconventional approaches to business, and was also a New York Times bestseller. The book was published by Perigee, an imprint of Penguin Random House.

His subsequent books include Direct Selling Success (2019), Radical Rebirth (2021), and The ABCs of MLM (2024). Radical Rebirth focuses on personal transformation and reconsideration of established patterns of thought and behavior.

In 2026, Gage published Wealth Without Apology, which addresses wealth, creation, scarcity beliefs, and personal responsibility.

== Speaking and recognition ==
Gage has been active as a professional speaker since 1991. He served as president of the Florida Speakers Association from 1996 to 1997 and received recognition from the organization, including its Member of the Year award and Lifetime Achievement Award.

In 2013, Gage was inducted into the National Speakers Association's CPAE Speaker Hall of Fame. The association recognized him among its 2013 inductees and noted his international speaking career and work as an author. At the same event, he received the Nido Qubein Philanthropist of the Year Award.

Gage's work has been discussed or featured in publications and media outlets including Forbes, Fortune, Entrepreneur, Inc., and Investor's Business Daily.

A member of the National Speakers Association (NSA),in July 2013 Gage was inducted into and at the same event won NSA's Nido Qubein Philanthropist of the Year Award.

== Personal life ==
Gage currently lives in Miami, Florida.

== Publications ==
- Randy Gage (2024). The ABCs of MLM. Prosperity Factory, Inc. ISBN 099794823X.
- Randy Gage (2021). Radical Rebirth. Prosperity Factory, Inc. ISBN 1884667376.
- Randy Gage (2019). Direct Selling Success. John Wiley & Sons. ISBN 9781119594550.
- Randy Gage (2016). Mad Genius: A Manifesto for Entrepreneurs. TarcherPerigee. ISBN 9780399175565.
- Randy Gage (March 2013). Why You're Dumb, Sick and Broke...And How to Get Smart, Healthy and Rich! (2nd ed.). John Wiley & Sons. ISBN 9781118548684.
- Randy Gage (December 2012). Risky is the New Safe: The Rules Have Changed. John Wiley & Sons. ISBN 9781118481479.
- Randy Gage (2011). Making the First Circle Work: The Foundation for Duplication in Network Marketing. Prime Concepts Group. ISBN 9780967316451.
- Randy Gage (November 2006). Why You're Dumb, Sick and Broke...And How to Get Smart, Healthy and Rich!. John Wiley & Sons. ISBN 9780470049310.
- Randy Gage (2003). Accept Your Abundance! Why You Are Supposed to Be Wealthy. Prime Concepts Group. ISBN 9780971557888.
- Randy Gage (2003). Prosperity Mind: How to Harness the Power of Thought. Prime Concepts Group. ISBN 9780971557864.
- Randy Gage (2003). The 7 Spiritual Laws of Prosperity: And how to Manifest Them in Your Life. Prime Concepts Group. ISBN 9780971557857.
- Randy Gage (2003). 101 Keys to Your Prosperity: Insights on Health, Happiness and Abundance in Your Life. Prime Concepts Group. ISBN 9780971557840.
- Randy Gage (2003). 37 Secrets about Prosperity: A Revealing Look at how You Manifest Wealth. Prime Concepts Group. ISBN 9780971557871.
- Randy Gage (2003). First Steps: Getting Started Fast in Network Marketing. Prime Concepts Group. ISBN 9780976229988.
- Randy Gage (2001). How to Build a Multi-level Money Machine: The Science of Network Marketing. Prime Concepts Group. ISBN 9780967316468.
