= Ernest Fitzgerald =

Ernest Fitzgerald may refer to:

- A. Ernest Fitzgerald (1926–2019), American engineer and U.S. government whistleblower
- Ernest A. Fitzgerald (1925–2001), American bishop of the United Methodist Church
