= Nido Qubein =

Lebanese-American university president and executive

Nido R. Qubein
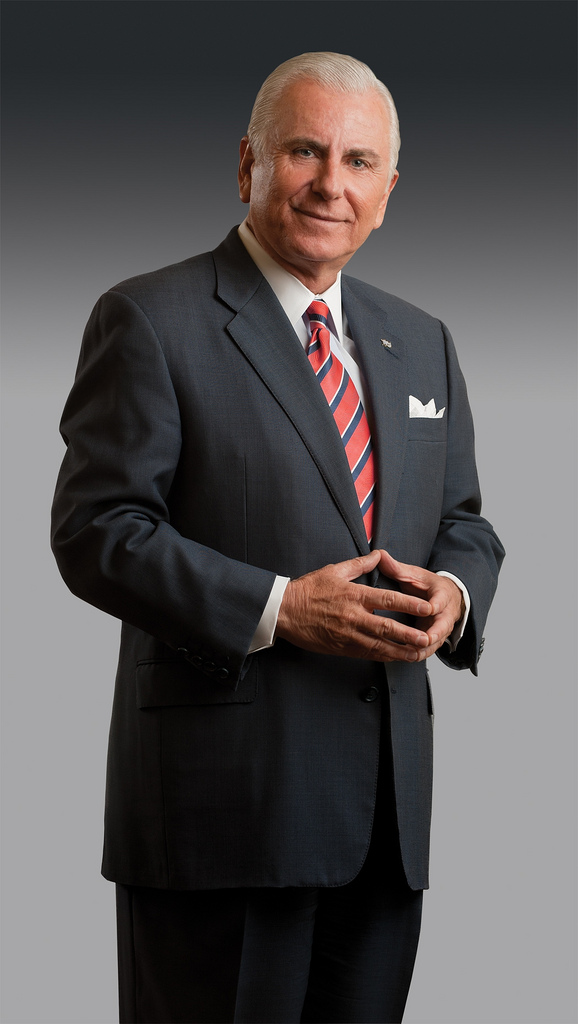

President of High Point University
- Incumbent
- Assumed office 2005
- Preceded by: Jacob C. Martinson Jr.

Personal details
- Born: August 21, 1948 (age 78) Jordan
- Education: St. George's School, Jerusalem; Mount Olive College; High Point University; University of North Carolina at Greensboro
- Website: nidoqubein.com highpoint.edu/president

Nido Qubein is a Lebanese American businessman. He has been the president of High Point University since 2005. He previously served as Chairman of the Great Harvest Bread Company and sat on the board of several companies, including Truist Financial.

== Early life and education ==
Nidal Qubein was born on August 21, 1948, in Jordan, to a Lebanese mother and a Jordanian father. The youngest of five children, he is a member of the prominent Christian Qubain family. Qubein's uncle, Najib, was the first bishop of the Anglican Diocese of Jordan, Lebanon and Syria.

His father died when Qubein was six, and he was mostly raised by his mother, a seamstress. He was educated at St. George's School, Jerusalem, before moving to the United States in 1966 to receive a college education at Mount Olive College. His two elder brothers attended Duke University. Qubein claims that he chose to attend Mount Olive because its name reminded him of the Mount of Olives in Jerusalem. Qubein transferred to High Point University, where he graduated in 1970. He went on to receive a Master of Science in business education from the University of North Carolina at Greensboro's Bryan School of Business & Economics in 1973.

== Business and educational career ==
Qubein started a newsletter aimed at Christian program directors, Adventures with Youth, soon after he arrived in the US, and eventually became a highly sought-after motivational speaker and corporate consultant. Qubein is the founder and chairman emeritus of the National Speakers Association Foundation. He is chairman emeritus of the Great Harvest Bread Company and previously sat on the board of directors of companies including BB&T, La-Z-Boy Corporation, and nThrive.

In 2005, Qubein was named President of High Point University, where he has presided over a rapid expansion of the school. Qubein is a major donor to High Point, having committed $10 million to the university, and is also one of the highest-paid university presidents in the United States, collecting a salary of $2.9 million per annum in 2013.

== Personal life ==
Qubein's wife, Mariana, is an alumna of High Point University. The couple has four children and nine grandchildren.

== Honors ==
In 1999, Qubein was honored with the Distinguished Alumnus Award from the University of North Carolina at Greensboro Bryan School of Business & Economics. In 2009, he was awarded an Honorary Doctor of Letters in humanities degree from the University of North Carolina at Greensboro.

In 2000, Toastmasters International awarded him their Golden Gavel Medal. That same year, Qubein was inducted into the Horatio Alger Association of Distinguished Americans. He was awarded the National Ethnic Coalition of Organizations' Ellis Island Medal of Honor.

In 2012, he was awarded the Daughters of the American Revolution Americanism Medal.

In early 2017, High Point University announced that it would name its new basketball arena and conference center for Qubein and his wife, Mariana. Construction on the new facility started in 2018 and opened in September 2021.

== Broadcasts ==
Beginning in January 2012, UNCTV began airing High Point University Presents A Conversation with... series. The hour-long segments feature Qubein interviewing prominent leaders and innovators.

In 2015, the Biography Channel aired Nido Qubein: A Life of Success and Significance.

A new interview series premiered in 2021 called “Side by Side with Nido Qubein”. The hour long discussion show airs on PBS NC.

== Publications ==
Qubein has written 11 books, including How To Communicate Like A Pro and Stairway to Success: The Complete Blueprint for Personal and Professional Achievement.
