= Mack B. Stokes =

Styles of The Right Reverend Marion "Mack" Boyd Stokes
- Reference style: The Right Reverend
- Spoken style: Bishop Stokes
- Religious style: Bishop
- Posthumous style
- Born: December 21, 1911; Wonsan, Korea
- Died: November 21, 2012 (aged 100)
- Education: Asbury College, Duke Divinity School, Boston University
- Alma mater: Asbury College, Duke Divinity School, Boston University
- Occupations: Theologian, bishop, professor
- Known for: Elected bishop of the United Methodist Church, professor at Candler School of Theology and Oral Roberts University
- Notable work: The Bible in the Wesleyan Heritage, Major United Methodist Beliefs
- Title: Bishop

Marion "Mack" Boyd Stokes (December 21, 1911 – November 21, 2012) was an American bishop of the United Methodist Church, elected in 1972. He was born in Wonsan, Korea of missionary parents. He is a graduate of Asbury College (A.B. degree), Duke Divinity School (B.D. degree, 1935), and Boston University (Ph.D. degree). He was a professor of systematic theology and Christian doctrine at Candler School of Theology at Emory University from 1941 until 1972. After retiring as a bishop, Stokes served as associate dean and professor of theology at Oral Roberts University, Tulsa, Oklahoma. He died at the age of 100 in 2012.

== Selected writings ==
- The Bible in the Wesleyan Heritage, Nashville, Abingdon, 1981.
- Major United Methodist Beliefs (Revised and Enlarged), Nashville, Abingdon, 1971 (previous editions: 1955 and 1956).

== See also ==
- List of bishops of the United Methodist Church
