= Scott J. Jones =

Methodist bishop and theologian

The Reverend Scott J. Jones
- Bishop of the Global Methodist Church
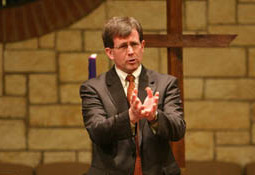
- Bishop Scott J. Jones preaches at Suncreek United Methodist Church in Allen, Texas, in 2007.
- Church: Global Methodist Church
- Appointed: January 9, 2023
- Previous posts: Bishop, Kansas Episcopal Area, United Methodist Church; Bishop, Great Plains Episcopal Area, UMC; Bishop, Texas Annual Conference, UMC

Personal details
- Born: May 23, 1954 (age 72) Nashville, Tennessee
- Denomination: Methodism
- Spouse: Mary Lou Reece
- Children: 3
- Education: University of Kansas (B.A.); Perkins School of Theology (M.Th.); Southern Methodist University (Ph.D.)

Scott Jameson Jones (born 23 May 1954) is an American bishop of the Global Methodist Church and former bishop of the United Methodist Church, elected in 2004, serving until his retirement and subsequent resignation from the episcopal office and transfer to the GMC in 2023.

== Early life, education and family ==
He was born in Nashville, Tennessee and raised in Illinois, Indiana and Colorado. Jones' younger brother, L. Gregory Jones, is also a theologian and serves as president of Belmont University. He met his wife, Mary Lou Reece, while a student at the University of Kansas, and they were married 18 August 1979. She is the president of Reece Construction Company, with offices in Salina, Kansas and Prosper, Texas. The couple has three children and five grandchildren.

Jones earned a B.A. degree in philosophy at the University of Kansas (1977 with highest honors). He is a member of Phi Beta Kappa. He earned an M.Th. degree at Perkins School of Theology, Southern Methodist University (1981 with high honors). Jones's Ph.D. is also from Southern Methodist University, which he earned in 1992 in religious studies.

== Theology ==
Jones holds to a Wesleyan-Arminian soteriology.

== Episcopal ministry ==
Jones was endorsed for election to the Episcopacy by the North Texas Conference Delegation to the South Central Jurisdictional Conference and was elected in July 2004. He was assigned to the Kansas Episcopal Area, with offices in Wichita, Kansas.

Jones took over the new Great Plains Conference, which was formed in 2014 by combining the former Kansas East, Kansas West and Nebraska United Methodist conferences.

In 2016 he was assigned to the Texas Annual Conference (Houston Area) where he served until January 2023.

In January 2023 Scott Jones resigned as a Bishop of the UMC and withdrew his conference membership to unite with The Global Methodist Church.

== Selected writings ==
- John Wesley's Conception and Use of Scripture, Nashville, Kingswood Books/Abingdon, 1995.
- Wesley and the Quadrilateral: Renewing the Conversation (with S. Gunter, T. Campbell, R. Miles and R. Maddox), Nashville, Abingdon, 1997.
- United Methodist Doctrine: The Extreme Center, Nashville, Abingdon, 2002.
- The Evangelistic Love of God and Neighbor: A Theology of Witness and Discipleship, Nashville, Abingdon, 2003. ISBN 0-687-04614-9
- The Wesleyan Way, Nashville, Abingdon, 2013.
- Ask: Faith Questions in a Skeptical Age (with Arthur D. Jones), Nashville, Abingdon, 2015.
- Scripture and the Wesleyan Way (with Arthur D. Jones), Nashville, Abingdon, 2018.

== See also ==
- List of bishops of the United Methodist Church
