= Robert Fisher (university president) =

American academic administrator

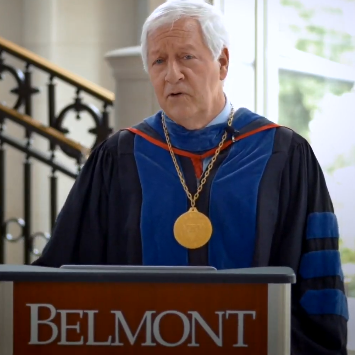
- Fisher in August 2020

11th President of Belmont University
- In office 2000–2021
- Preceded by: William E. Troutt
- Succeeded by: L. Gregory Jones

Personal details
- Born: 1948 (age 77–78) Blytheville, Arkansas, U.S.
- Spouse: Judy
- Education: Henderson State University (BS); University of Memphis (MBA); University of Arkansas (PhD)

Robert Fisher (born c. 1948) is an American academic administrator. He served as the president of Belmont University in Nashville, Tennessee, U.S. from 2000 to 2021. He was one of the highest paid university presidents in the United States.

== Early life ==
Robert Fisher was born circa 1948 in Blytheville, Arkansas. He graduated from Henderson State University, where he earned a bachelor of science in business administration. He subsequently earned a master in business administration from the University of Memphis, and a PhD from the University of Arkansas.

== Career ==
Fisher was the dean of the Henderson State University School of Business. He was the vice president of Arkansas State University.

Fisher was the president of Belmont University from 2000 to 2021. During his tenure, Fisher expanded the student body beyond the traditional pool of local residents. Enrollment also went from under 3,000 to over 8,000 between 2000 and 2017. He also oversaw the construction of the Curb Event Center and Beaman Student Life Center, the Gordon E. Inman Center, the Troutt Theater complex, and McWhorter Hall. In 2010, when a lesbian soccer coach was let go shortly after coming out, Fisher said sexual orientation was irrelevant to Belmont's decision to fire or hire faculty and staff, and that gay and lesbian students were "welcome" on campus.

Fisher is one of the highest paid university presidents in the United States. He earned $2,120,091 in 2016.

== Personal life ==
Fisher has a wife, Judy, with whom he has co-authored a book. Bob also serves on the board of directors of the National Museum of African American Music.

== Works ==
- Fisher, Bob; Thomas, Bo (1997). Real Dream Teams: Seven Practices Used by World-class Team Leaders to Achieve Extraordinary Results. Boca Raton, Florida: St. Lucie Press. ISBN 9781574440065.
- Fisher, Bob; Fisher, Judy (2008). Life Is a Gift: Inspiration from the Soon Departed. Faithwords. ISBN 9780446196369.
