= Willie James Jennings =

American theologian (born 1961)

The Reverend Dr. Willie James Jennings
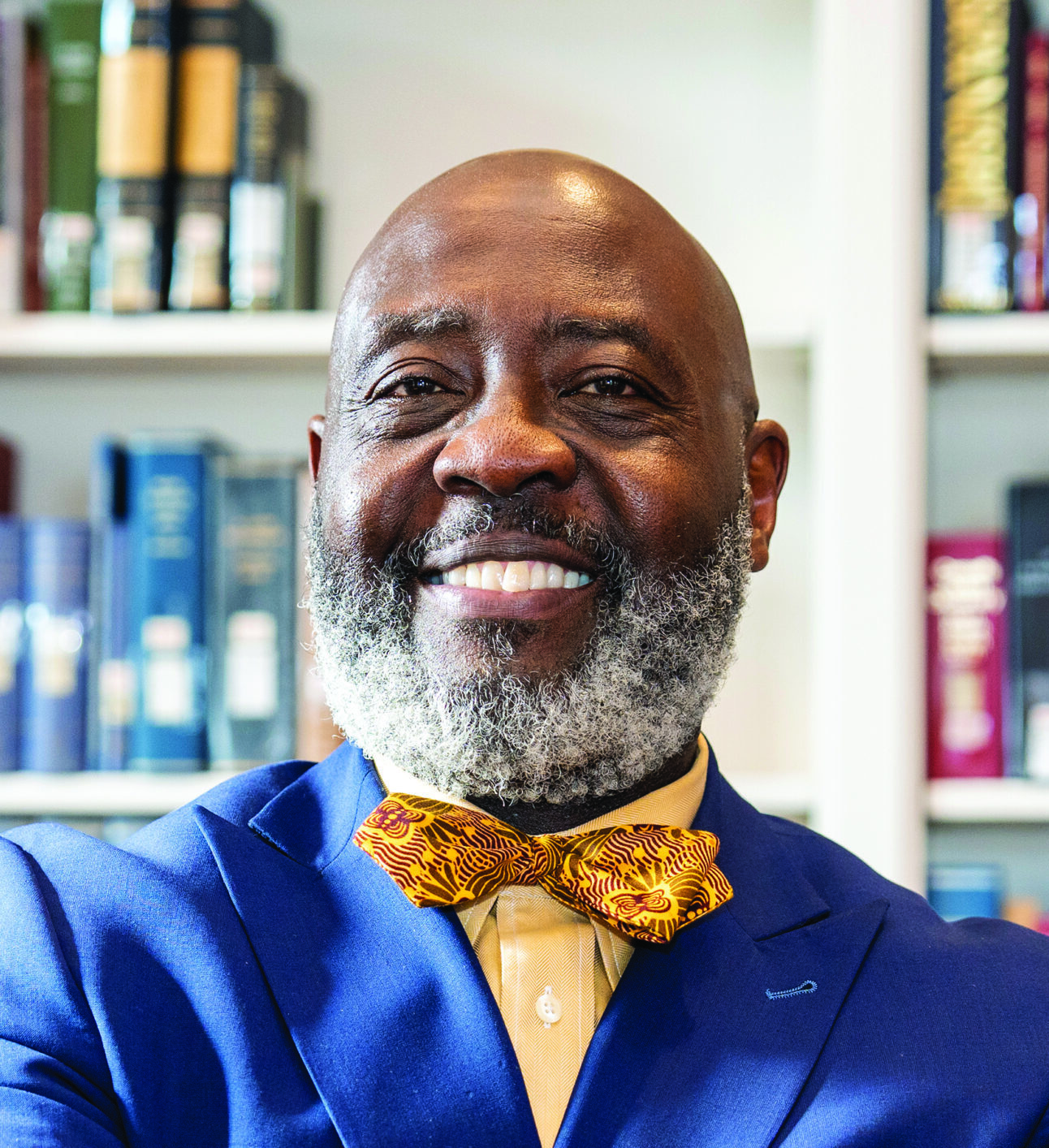
- Portrait of Jennings in 2023
- Born: April 29, 1961 (age 65)
- Spouse: Joanne Browne

Academic background
- Education: Calvin College Fuller Theological Seminary Duke University

Academic work
- Institutions: Duke University Yale University
- Notable works: The Christian Imagination: Theology and the Origins of Race

Willie James Jennings (born April 29, 1961) is an American theologian, known for his contributions to theologies of body and land which traverse numerous disciplines including, but not limited to postcolonial theologies, liberation theologies, cultural identities, and theological anthropology. He is currently the Andrew W. Mellon Professor of systematic theology and Africana studies at Yale University Divinity School.

== Career ==
Jenning gained his B.A. in religion and theology at Calvin College in 1984, and his M.Div. at Fuller Theological Seminary in 1987. He completed his Ph.D. in religion, with a concentration on theology and ethics, at Duke University in 1993, supervised under Geoffrey Wainwright. His Ph.D. dissertation topic was "Reclaiming the Creature: Anthropological Vision in the Thought of Athanasius of Alexandria and Karl Barth."

From 1990 to 2015, Jennings worked at Duke University Divinity School and taught theology and black church studies there, before he was appointed associate professor of systematic theology and Africana studies at Yale in 2015. He is an ordained Baptist minister and has served as interim pastor for several North Carolina churches. He presented the 2026 Warfield Lectures on the theme "Only Then Will We Build: Forming a Real Doctrine of Creation."

== Writings ==
In 2010, Yale University Press published Jennings's The Christian Imagination: Theology and the Origins of Race. The book is a study of the circumstances and theology precipitating Christian participation in racism and colonialism. Syndicate editor-in-chief Christian Amondson considered it a "bold, creative, and courageous critique" of supersessionism and its entanglement in socially constructed ideas about race. Carroll College professor Eric Dayl Meyer called the book "a significant contribution to academic theology". For writing The Christian Imagination, Jennings received the American Academy of Religion's 2011 award for the best book in constructive theology and the 2015 Grawemeyer Award in Religion. In 2017, the Belief Bible commentary series released Jennings's Acts: A Theological Commentary on the Bible, a volume the journal Horizons called "musical and aesthetically charged" and recommended to scholars of race and postcolonialism.

== Selected works ==
- The Christian Imagination: Theology and the Origins of Race. New Haven, CT: Yale University Press, 2010. ISBN 978-0-30017136-5
- Acts: A Theological Commentary on the Bible. Westminster John Knox Press, 2017. ISBN 978-0-66423400-3
- After Whiteness: An Education in Belonging. Grand Rapids, MI: Eerdman's Press, 2020. ISBN 1-46745976-3

== See also ==
- Liberation Theology
- Postcolonial Theology
- Racialization

== Sources ==
- Reynolds, Susan B. (June 2018). "Acts: A Theological Commentary on the Bible. By Willie James Jennings". Horizons. 45 (1): 202–204. doi:10.1017/hor.2018.30.
