= L. Gregory Jones =

American academic

12th President of Belmont University
- Incumbent
- Assumed office June 2021
- Preceded by: Robert Fisher

Personal details
- Born: 1960 (age 65–66) Nashville, Tennessee, U.S.
- Spouse: Susan Pendleton Jones
- Children: 3
- Relatives: Scott J. Jones (brother)
- Education: University of Denver (BA, MPA); Duke University (MDiv, PhD)

Lorentz Gregory Jones (commonly styled as L. Gregory Jones) is an American theologian and academic administrator who is currently the President of Belmont University, serving since June 2021. He was previously the executive vice president and provost of Baylor University and Dean of the Duke Divinity School at Duke University. He also formerly served as vice president and vice provost for global strategy and programs at Duke University (a position that he served for a short period). He is also A. Morris and Ruth W. Williams distinguished professor of theology in the Duke Divinity School. In addition, he serves as senior fellow for Leadership Education at Duke Divinity, and senior fellow at the Fuqua-Coach K Center on Leadership and Ethics. From 1997 to 2010 he was Dean of Duke Divinity School. He graduated with a B.A. in communications and M.P.A. from the University of Denver, an M.Div. from Duke Divinity School and a Ph.D. in theology from Duke University. He is the author or editor of seventeen books.

Jones is the younger brother of Global Methodist Bishop Scott J. Jones.
