= Risky is the New Safe: The Rules Have Changed =

2012 book by Randy Gage

- Risky is the New Safe: The Rules Have Changed
- Author: Randy Gage
- Language: English
- Subject: Success and prosperity
- Genre: Non-fiction
- Published: 2012
- Publisher: John Wiley & Sons
- Publication place: United States
- Media type: Print, Hardcover, Audio book
- ISBN: 9781118481479
- Website: randygage.com

Risky is the New Safe, first published in 2012, is the 9th book by the author Randy Gage. It explores the fields of disruptive technology, economic upheaval, and the accelerating speed of change and advocates a risk-taking approach towards business and life. The book was a Wall Street Journal #1 best seller and a New York Times best seller. The book has been noted for its non-conventional approach towards the economy and success.

== Publication ==
The book was published in 2012 by the publisher John Wiley & Sons in Hard Cover in a single volume edition. The book has been translated into 16 languages including Spanish, Chinese, and Russian.

== Overview ==
Risky is the New Safe promotes the concept of resisting conventional thinking in a continuously changing economy. The book covers factors and mindsets that are required to succeed. Exactly as the title suggests, the book considers risk taking to be the new way of securing safety in a market or life in general. It suggests that doing nothing or going for the safer options results not only in lost opportunity but also leaves you vulnerable towards unforeseen risks that you would be taking anyway in any case and, thus, explores the approach of intentionally taking risks as the rules of the society and markets have changed with disruptive technologies changing everything at a fast pace. According to Gage, "The reality is most people today are automatons, blindly following the herd through the motions of life," he writes. "Instead of being afraid of being contrarian, you should be afraid if you’re not," he writes. "Not only is risky the new safe in the new economy," he continues, "weird is the new normal."

The book further focuses on learning from other multimillionaires, accelerating education, branding and social media and ideas among other things.

Risky is the New Safe was listed among the New York Times best sellers as well as Reuters best sellers in 2012. The book was also a top best seller in The Wall Street Journal.

== The Author ==
Gage was raised by his mother in Madison, Wisconsin. At the age of 15 he was charged with armed robbery to fund a drug deal which resulted in his expulsion and time in juvenile jail. In 1975, he moved to Miami, Florida where he worked as a minimum wage dishwasher. Although he successfully became a manager at the age of 16 and started in the network marketing industry with Amway when he was 20, at the age of 30, he was left heavily in debt after his second franchised pizza restaurant failed at the corporate level.

Gage started his career as an author writing self-help books on the subject of prosperity from 1990. Since then, Gage has written over 10 books and delivers lectures, internationally, on the subjects of success and prosperity.

Apart from coaching on prosperity and delivering international lectures, Gage has released over 50 resources which have been translated into more than 15 languages.
