= Lauren Winner =

American writer (born 1976)

The Reverend Lauren Winner
- Born: 1976 (age 49–50)
- Other name: Lauren Frances Winner
- Spouse: Griff Gatewood (m. 2003; div. 2009)

Ecclesiastical career
- Religion: Christianity (Anglican)
- Church: Episcopal Church (United States)
- Ordained: 2011 (priest)

Academic background
- Education: Columbia University; Clare College, Cambridge; Duke University
- Thesis: Material Culture and Household Religious Practice in Colonial Virginia (2006)

Academic work
- Discipline: History; religious studies
- Institutions: Duke University

Lauren Frances Winner (born 1976) is an American historian, scholar of religion, and Episcopal priest. She is associate professor of Christian spirituality at Duke Divinity School. Winner writes and lectures on Christian practice, the history of Christianity in America, and Jewish–Christian relations.

== Early life and education ==
Winner was born to a Jewish father and a Southern Baptist mother, and was raised Jewish. She converted to Orthodox Judaism in her freshman year at Columbia University, and then to Christianity while doing her master's degree at Cambridge University, and one of her books, Mudhouse Sabbath, is about becoming a Christian while appreciating the Jewishness of historical Christian faith. She completed her doctoral work at Columbia University in 2006. Winner's fourth book, A Cheerful and Comfortable Faith: Anglican Religious Practice in the Elite Households of Colonial Virginia is based on her dissertation.

== Career ==
Winner has worked as a book editor of Beliefnet and senior editor of Christianity Today. In 2000 she wrote a column asserting that few young evangelicals took a commitment to premarital chastity seriously, using the phrase "evangelical whores". Julia Duin suggests that Winner was a "fairly recent convert" at the time, and "the evangelical response to Winner was livid." Duin goes on to relate that "Christianity Today quickly demoted her to a staff writer spot when people started asking why such a recent convert in her early twenties and still in grad school had managed to attain senior writer status at such a revered publication."

Winner completed a Master of Divinity degree at Duke University in 2007. She has been a visiting fellow at the Center for the Study of Religion at Princeton University and the Institute of Sacred Music at Yale University and volunteers regularly at the Raleigh Correctional Center for Women.

Her memoir, Girl Meets God has been described as "a passionate and thoroughly engaging account of a continuing spiritual journey within two profoundly different faiths." A second memoir, Still: Notes on a Mid-faith Crisis (2012) chronicles her thoughts on God as she descends into doubt and spiritual crisis following the failure of her brief (2003–2009) marriage. Christianity Today called Still "an instant spiritual classic." Her other books include Mudhouse Sabbath; Real Sex: The Naked Truth about Chastity; and Wearing God: Clothing, Laughter, Fire, and Other Overlooked Ways of Meeting God (2016).

Winner was ordained to the priesthood in the Episcopal Diocese of Virginia in December 2011. She has taught at Duke Divinity School since 2007. Beginning July 1, 2026, she will be St. Margaret’s Visiting Professor of Women in Ministry at the Church Divinity School of the Pacific.

== Bibliography ==
- Girl Meets God: A Memoir (2003)
- Real Sex: The Naked Truth about Chastity (2006)
  - Sexo verdadero: La castidad al desnudo
- Mudhouse Sabbath: An Invitation to a Life of Spiritual Discipline (Paraclete Press, 2007) ISBN 9781557255327
- A Cheerful and Comfortable Faith: Anglican Religious Practice in the Elite Households of Eighteenth-Century Virginia (Yale University Press, 2010) ISBN 9780300124699
- Still: Notes on a Mid-Faith Crisis (HarperOne, 2012) ISBN 9780061768118
- Wearing God: Clothing, Laughter, Fire, and Other Overlooked Ways of Meeting God (HarperOne, 2015) ISBN 9780061768132
- (contributor) What Did Jesus Ask? (Time, 2015) ISBN 9781618930583
- A Word to Live By (Church's Teachings for a Changing World) (Church Publishing, 2017) ISBN 9780898692587
- The Dangers of Christian Practice: On Wayward Gifts, Characteristic Damage, and Sin (Yale University Press, 2018) ISBN 9780300215823
