= Duke Divinity School =

Divinity school at Duke University

Coordinates: 36.0020°N 78.9398°W

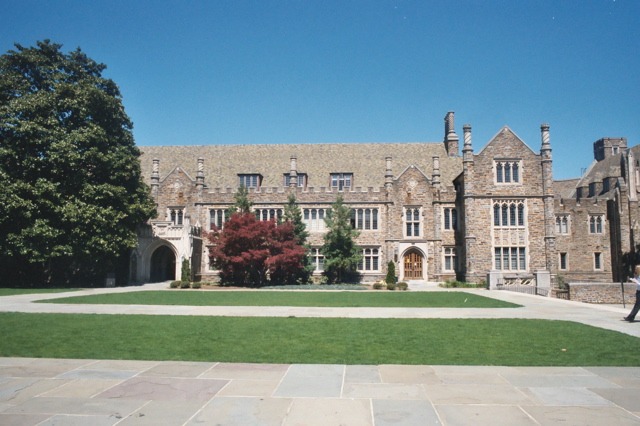
- Duke Divinity School Gray Building
- Type: Private divinity school
- Established: 1926; 100 years ago
- Parent institution: Duke University
- Religious affiliation: United Methodist Church
- Dean: Edgardo Colón-Emeric
- Location: Durham, North Carolina
- Website: divinity.duke.edu

The Duke Divinity School at Duke University in Durham, North Carolina, is one of ten graduate or professional schools within Duke University. It is also one of thirteen seminaries founded and supported by the United Methodist Church. It has 39 regular rank faculty and 15 joint, secondary or adjunct faculty, and, as of 2017, an enrollment of 543 full-time equivalent students. The current dean of the Divinity School is the Rev. Dr. Edgardo Colón-Emeric, who assumed the deanship on August 31, 2021. Former deans include the prominent New Testament scholar Richard B. Hays, who stepped down in 2015.

== History ==
The Divinity School was founded in 1926 as the first graduate school at Duke, following a large endowment by James B. Duke, a tobacco magnate, in 1924. The Divinity School carries on from the original founding of Trinity College in 1859, which provided free training for Methodist preachers in exchange for support from the church. Though the school is affiliated with the United Methodist Church, it is also ecumenical in outlook and has both faculty and students from a variety of denominations.

The Divinity School consists of three buildings: the original Gray Building, the Langford Building, and the Westbrook Building. The most recent building is the Hugh A. Westbrook Building, which opened in 2005 and is 53,000 square feet (4,900 m^{2}). It also contains the 315-seat Bishop W. Kenneth Goodson Chapel with 55-foot (17 m)-high ceilings, office space, a bookstore, cafe, outdoor patio, and a 177-seat lecture hall.

Stanley Hauerwas, considered one of the leading exponents of postliberal and narrative approaches to theology, was a longtime professor at Duke Divinity School, serving as the Gilbert T. Rowe Professor of Theological Ethics. Time magazine named Hauerwas "America's Best Theologian" in 2001. Hauerwas retired in 2013, but continues to write and speak at Duke as a senior research fellow.

Duke Divinity also benefits from the resources of The Duke Endowment, providing an outlet for this fund's support of higher education and the rural church in North Carolina. Resources from the Charlotte, North Carolina–based endowment go to underwrite Divinity School programs for field education, continuing education, the Thriving Rural Communities Initiative, and Hispanic Ministries. The Divinity School also receives support from the Ministerial Education Fund of the United Methodist Church for student financial aid, faculty support, and other core mission programs of the school.

== Deans ==
- 1926–1928: Edmund Davison Soper
- 1928–1941: Elbert Russell
- 1941–1944: Paul Neff Garber
- 1944–1946: Harvie Branscomb
- 1946–1947: Gilbert T. Rowe (acting)
- 1947: Paul E. Root (died before assuming office)
- 1947–1950: Harold A. Bosley
- 1950–1951: James Cannon III (acting)
- 1951–1958: James Cannon III
- 1958–1971: Robert Earl Cushman
- 1971–1981: Thomas A. Langford
- 1981–1982: Jameson Jones
- 1982–1997: Dennis M. Campbell
- 1997–2010: L. Gregory Jones
- 2010–2015: Richard B. Hays
- 2015–2016: Ellen F. Davis
- 2016–2018: Elaine Heath
- 2018–2021: L. Gregory Jones
- 2021–present: Edgardo Colón-Emeric

== Notable faculty ==
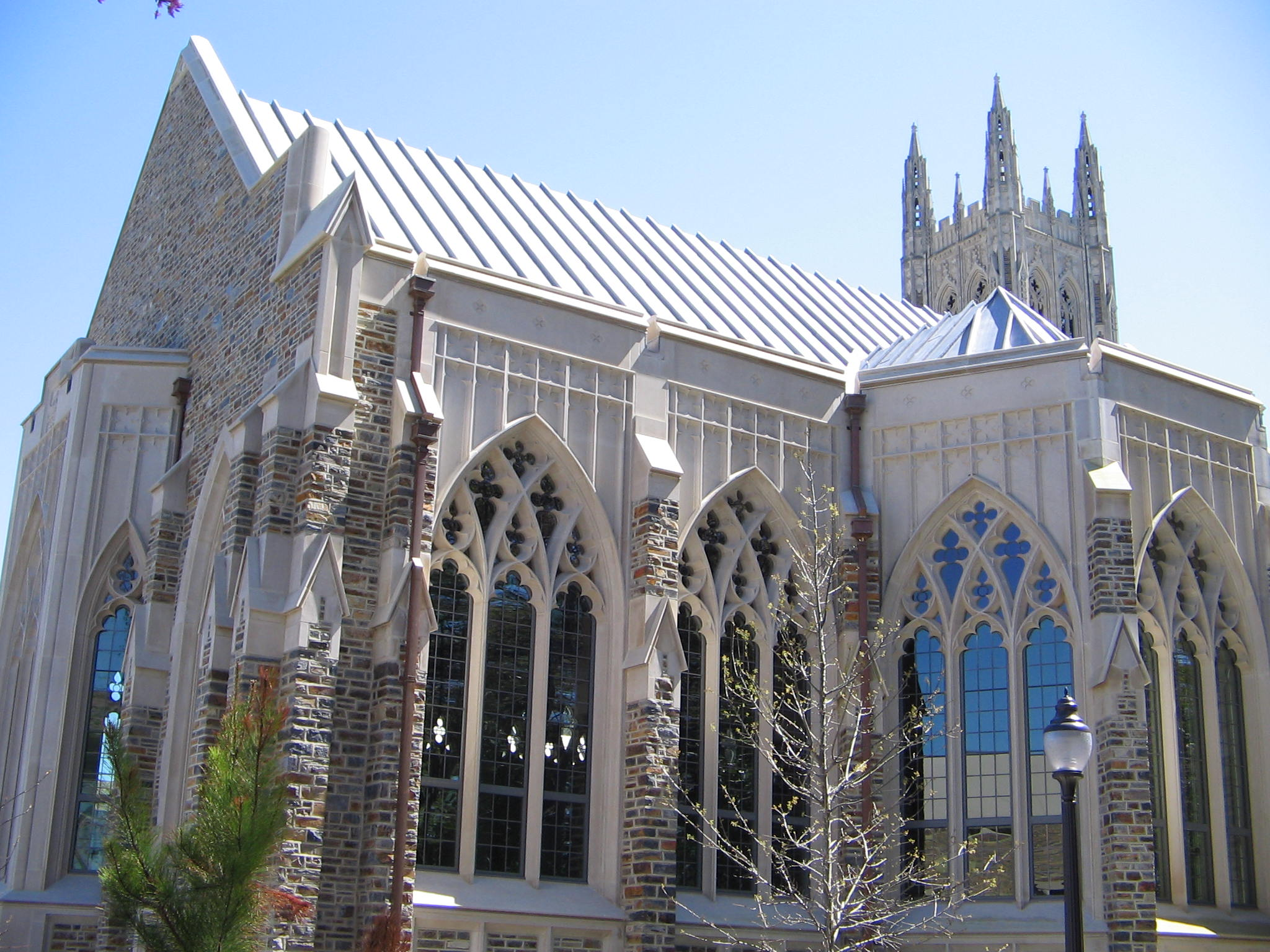
The exterior of Goodson Chapel, the worship space at Duke Divinity School.

- David Aers, James B. Duke Professor of English and Historical Theology
- Jeremy Begbie, Thomas A. Langford Distinguished Professor of Theology and director of the Duke Initiatives in Theology and the Arts
- Kate Bowler, Associate Professor of American Religious History
- Luke Bretherton, Robert E. Cushman Distinguished Professor of Moral and Political Theology
- Ellen F. Davis, Amos Ragan Kearns Distinguished Professor of Bible and Practical Theology
- Stanley Hauerwas, Gilbert T. Rowe Gilbert T. Rowe Professor Emeritus of Divinity and Law
- Richard B. Hays, Former dean and George Washington Ivey Professor Emeritus of New Testament
- Frederick Herzog, systematic theologian and champion of civil rights, on the faculty from 1960 to 1995
- Reinhard Hütter, Visiting Professor Catholic Theology
- Willie James Jennings, Former Associate Professor of Theology and Black Church Studies
- L. Gregory Jones, Dean of the Divinity School as well as Ruth W. and A. Morris Williams Jr. Distinguished Professor of Theology and Christian Ministry (also a Duke University alumnus)
- Richard Alan Lischer, James T. and Alice Mead Cleland Professor Emeritus of Preaching
- C. Kavin Rowe, George Washington Ivey Distinguished Professor of New Testament
- Lester Ruth, Research Professor of Christian Worship
- Timothy Tyson, Former Visiting Professor of American Christianity and Southern Culture
- Geoffrey Wainwright, Robert Earl Cushman Professor Emeritus of Christian Theology
- Samuel Wells, research professor of Christian ethics at Duke Divinity School from 2005 to 2012
- Lauren Winner, Associate Professor of Christian Spirituality
- William Willimon, Professor of Practice of Christian Ministry as well as former United Methodist Church bishop
- Norman Wirzba, Gilbert T. Rowe Distinguished Professor of Christian Theology as well as Senior Fellow at the Kenan Institute for Ethics at Duke University

== Notable alumni ==
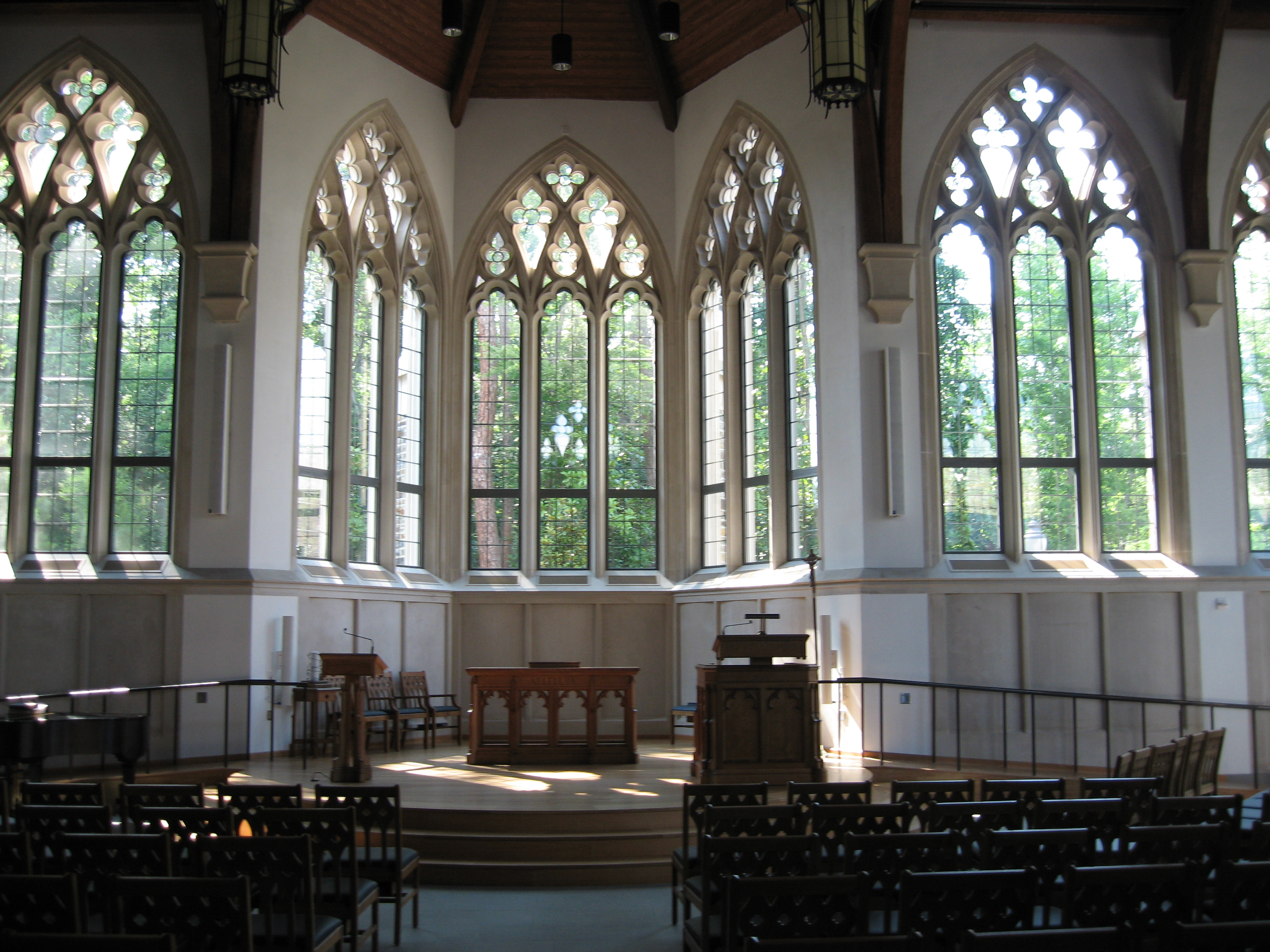
The interior of Goodson Chapel

- Jamal Harrison Bryant (M.Div.) – senior pastor of New Birth Missionary Baptist Church
- William Barber II (M.Div. 1989) - a civil rights activist and professor at Yale Divinity School
- Edwin Charles Boulton (M.Div. 1953) – a bishop of the United Methodist Church
- Kenneth H. Carter Jr. (M.Div.) – a bishop of the United Methodist Church and Bishop-in-Residence at Duke Divinity School
- Finis Alonzo Crutchfield Jr. (1940) – bishop of the United Methodist Church (1972–1974)
- Ernest A. Fitzgerald (B.D. degree, 1951) – retired bishop of the United Methodist Church
- Amile Jefferson (MA in Christian Studies 2017) – NBA player with the Orlando Magic, first Duke basketball player to be a 4 time All-ACC Academic All-Star.
- Vergel L. Lattimore (M.Div. 1977) – Air National Guard brigadier general
- Deidre Palmer, president of the Uniting Church in Australia from 8 July 2018
- Gregory V. Palmer (M.Div. 1979) – former president of the United Methodist Council of Bishops (2008–2010)
- Andrew Purves (Th. M. degree) – holds the Hugh Thomson Kerr Chair in Pastoral Theology at Pittsburgh Theological Seminary
- Adam Shoemaker, Episcopal clergyman
- Mack B. Stokes (B.D. degree, 1935) – retired bishop of the United Methodist Church
- Randall Wallace (Did not graduate, but did attend) – Hollywood screenwriter, producer and director, involved with Braveheart, The Man in the Iron Mask, Pearl Harbor, and We Were Soldiers
- Roy Kinneer Patteson Jr., Th.M, 1964; Ph.D graduate studies in religion 1967. Noted ancient language scholar, authority on the origin of the alphabet and former president of Southern Virginia University and King College
- Sandra Steiner Ball (M.Div. 1987) – a bishop of the United Methodist Church
- Jacob C. Martinson Jr. (1957) – former president of Andrew College, Brevard College, and High Point University
- Beverly Roberts Gaventa (Ph.D. degree) – distinguished professor of New Testament interpretation at Baylor University and Helen H.P. Manson Professor of New Testament Literature and Exegesis Emerita at Princeton Theological Seminary
- Hugh A. Westbrook (M.Div., 1970) – hospice pioneer and co-founder of Hospice Care, Inc (later VITAS Healthcare)

== Awards and prizes ==
Among its student awards, the Divinity School awards a prize for Excellence in Writing in honor of the American theologian and writer, Frederick Buechner. Winners of the prize are selected by faculty in recognition of their significant achievements in these areas.

Other annual student awards include the Award for Excellence in Bible, the Hoyt Hickman Award for Excellence in Liturgics, and the Jameson Jones Preaching Award.
