= Ernest A. Fitzgerald =

American bishop (1925-2001)

Ernest A. Fitzgerald (24 July 1925 – 27 September 2001) was an American bishop of the United Methodist Church, elected in 1984.

== Birth and family ==
He was born in Crouse, North Carolina. He married Sarah Frances Perry of Wingate, North Carolina 24 August 1945. The Fitzgeralds have two children: son Jimmy and wife Phyllis; and daughter Patty and husband Charles Poole. The Fitzgeralds also have three grandchildren.

Bishop Fitzgerald died on September 27, 2001, in Winston-Salem, N.C. from pulmonary fibrosis.

== Education ==
Fitzgerald earned the A.B. degree from Western Carolina University (1947). He earned the Bachelor of Divinity degree from Duke Divinity School (1951). He has honorary doctorates from High Point College (1969), Pfeiffer College (1986), Greensboro College (1993) and Union College (1994). In addition, he received Distinguished Alumni Awards from Western Carolina (1981) and Duke Divinity School (1983).

== Ordained ministry ==
During his college years, Ernest pastored the Webster Circuit of the Western North Carolina Annual Conference of the Methodist Church, of which he became a Member in Full Connection and was ordained elder in 1949. He subsequently served the following pastorates in this conference: Liberty Circuit (1947–50); Calvary Church in Asheboro (1950–55); Abernathy Church in Asheville (1955–59); Purcell Church in Charlotte (1959–64); Grace Church in Greensboro (1964–66); Centenary Church in Winston-Salem (1966–82); and the West Market Street Church in Greensboro.

Rev. Fitzgerald was elected a delegate to the Southeastern Jurisdictional Conference of the U.M. Church, 1968–84, and to the General Conference, 1980–84. He also attended the World Methodist Conferences of 1966 and 1971.

The author of numerous books, Rev. Fitzgerald also was a regular contributor to the Piedmont Airlines inflight magazine, the Jaycees publication, and Amtrak. He has also written for United Methodist Church publications. In 1983 he was the Preacher for the Methodist series of the radio program "The Protestant Hour."

== Episcopal ministry ==
The 1984 Southeastern Jurisdictional Conference, meeting at Lake Junaluska, North Carolina, elected Rev. Fitzgerald a Bishop of the Church. He was assigned to the Atlanta Episcopal Area (the North and South Georgia Annual Conferences). Bishop Fitzgerald also served on the U.M. General Council on Ministries, the Task Force on the Korean Church, the Older Adult Task Force, and as President of the United Methodist Development Fund.

He retired in 1992.

== See also ==
- List of bishops of the United Methodist Church
