= Richard B. Hays =

American theologian (1948–2025)

The Reverend Doctor Richard B. Hays
- Born: Richard Bevan Hays; May 4, 1948; Oklahoma City, Oklahoma, U.S.
- Died: January 3, 2025 (aged 76); Nashville, Tennessee, U.S.
- Spouse: Judith Cheek (m. 1970)
- Children: 2

Ecclesiastical career
- Religion: Christianity (Methodist)
- Church: United Methodist Church

Academic background
- Education: Yale University (BA); Yale Divinity School (MDiv); Emory University (PhD)

Academic work
- Discipline: Biblical studies
- Sub-discipline: New Testament studies
- Institutions: Yale University; Duke University

Richard Bevan Hays (May 4, 1948 – January 3, 2025) was an American New Testament scholar and George Washington Ivey Professor Emeritus of New Testament Duke Divinity School in Durham, North Carolina. He was an ordained minister in the United Methodist Church.

== Biography ==
Born on May 4, 1948, in Oklahoma City, Hays' parents divorced when he was three years old and he was raised by his mother, a Methodist church organist. Although he spent much time in the church, he rejected Christianity in his youth, believing that its adherents were hypocritical. As a student at Yale College, Hays was inspired by school chaplain William Sloane Coffin's faith and the role it played in his social activism. During his sophomore year, Hays reverted to Christianity after reading a verse from the Gospel of Mark during a Christmas Eve service.

Hays married Judith Cheek in 1970. Shortly before he married her, Hays predicted that he would either become a pastor or a rock and roll star. Hays also received his Bachelor of Arts degree in English literature in 1970, becoming an English teacher at a high school in Longmeadow, Massachusetts, shortly thereafter. However, he was dissatisfied with his teaching job and instead pursued the field of biblical scholarship. Hays received Master of Divinity degree from Yale Divinity School in 1977, and his Doctor of Philosophy degree from Emory University in 1981.

Hays returned to Yale Divinity School as an assistant professor of New Testament in 1981 and taught there until 1991, when he moved to Duke Divinity School. He was named George Washington Ivey Professor of New Testament in 2002. In 2010, he became dean of the Divinity School. He stepped down from the role of dean in 2015 and went on medical leave following a diagnosis of pancreatic cancer. After successful treatment, he was able to return to teaching, and retired in 2018. In the summer of 2022, Hays was diagnosed with a recurrence of pancreatic cancer, and by fall of 2024, the cancer metastasized to both of his lungs. He died at his home in Nashville, Tennessee, on January 3, 2025, at the age of 76.

== Scholarship ==
Hays was considered one of the world's leading New Testament scholars, with Stanley Hauerwas writing "There are few people I would rather read for the actual exposition of the New Testament than Richard Hays." Hays' work focused on New Testament theology and ethics, the Pauline epistles, and early Christian interpretation of the Old Testament.

Some of Hays' studies surrounded the narrative interpretation of Scripture, the New Testament's use of the Old Testament, the subjective genitive reading of pistis Christou ("faith(fulness) of Christ") in Paul, and the role of community in the New Testament. Hays was well known for his criticisms of the Jesus Seminar and the modern Historical Jesus movement. Hays was also vocal about his criticisms of Dan Brown's best-selling The Da Vinci Code for its controversial historical claims.

Christianity Today named Hays' book Moral Vision of the New Testament one of the top 100 most important religious books of the 20th century. As a theologically conservative Methodist, throughout the course of his career remained committed to his Wesleyan roots in emphasizing the importance of charity and friendship in the Christian life. Moreover, Hays was a committed pacifist. He made his position clear in The Moral Vision of the New Testament, in which he argued that Jesus Christ taught his disciples to be non-violent.

Hays and his son, Christopher, published a new book, The Widening of God's Mercy, a book which argues that the biblical narrative and the expanse of God's mercy indicate the full inclusion of LGBTQ people within the church. They were interviewed about the book and its genesis on the U.S. National Public Radio program All Things Considered.

In 2008, a Festschrift was published in his honor for his sixtieth birthday. The Word Leaps the Gap: Essays on Scripture and Theology in Honor of Richard B. Hays included contributions from Stanley Hauerwas, E. P. Sanders, James D. G. Dunn, Francis Watson, N. T. Wright, and Ellen F. Davis.

== Selected works ==
=== Books ===
- Hays, Richard B. (1989). Echoes of Scripture in the Letters of Paul. New Haven, Connecticut: Yale University Press. ISBN 9780300044713.
- ——— (1996). The Moral Vision of the New Testament: Community, Cross, New Creation. San Francisco, California: HarperSanFrancisco. ISBN 978-0-0606-3796-5. OCLC 34409994.
- ——— (1997). First Corinthians. Interpretation. Louisville, Kentucky: Westminster, John Knox Press.
- ——— (1998). New Testament Ethics: the story retold. J. J. Thiessen lectures. Vol. 1997. Winnipeg, Ontario: CMBC Publications. ISBN 978-0-9207-1861-2. OCLC 40052874.
- ——— (2002). The Faith of Jesus Christ: The Narrative Substructure of Galatians 3:1–4:11 (2nd ed.). Grand Rapids, Michigan: Eerdmans.
- ——— (2005). The Conversion of the Imagination: Paul as Interpreter of Israel's Scripture. Grand Rapids, Michigan: Eerdmans.
- ——— (2014). Reading Backwards: figural Christology and the fourfold gospel witness. London, England: SPCK Publishing. ISBN 978-0281074082.
- ——— (2016). Echoes of Scripture in the Gospels. Baylor University Press. ISBN 9781481305242.
- ——— (2020). Reading with the Grain of Scripture. Grand Rapids, Michigan: Eerdmans. ISBN 9780802878458.
- ——— (2024). The Widening of God's Mercy: Sexuality Within the Biblical Story. New Haven, Connecticut: Yale University Press. ISBN 9780300273427.

=== Edited by ===
- ———; Davis, Ellen F., eds. (2003). The Art of Reading Scripture. Grand Rapids, Michigan: Eerdmans. ISBN 9780802812698. OCLC 53287862.
- ———; Alkier, Stefan, eds. (2005). Die Bibel im Dialog der Schriften: Konzepte intertextueller Bibellektuere (in German). Tübingen/Basel: Francke.
- ———; Gaventa, Beverly Roberts, eds. (2008). Seeking the Identity of Jesus: A Pilgrimage. Grand Rapids, Michigan: Eerdmans. ISBN 9780802824714. OCLC 213452269.
- ———; Alkier, Stefan; Huizenga, Leroy Andrew, eds. (2009). Reading the Bible intertextually. Waco, Texas: Baylor University Press. ISBN 9781602581807. OCLC 213599385.
- ———; Perrin, Nicholas, eds. (2011). Jesus, Paul and the People of God: A Theological Dialogue with N. T. Wright. Downers Grove, Illinois: IVP Academic. ISBN 978-0-830-83897-4. OCLC 666492764.
- ———; Alkier, Stefan, eds. (2012). Revelation and the Politics of Apocalyptic Interpretation. Waco, Texas: Baylor University Press. ISBN 9781602585614. OCLC 773273276.

=== Chapters ===
- ——— (2003). "Reading Scripture in Light of the Resurrection". In ———; Davis, Ellen F. (eds.). The Art of Reading Scripture. Grand Rapids, Michigan: Eerdmans. pp. 216–238. ISBN 9780802812698. OCLC 53287862.
- ——— (2008). "The Story of God's Son: The identity of Jesus in the letters of Paul". In ———; Gaventa, Beverly Roberts (eds.). Seeking the Identity of Jesus: A Pilgrimage. Grand Rapids, Michigan: Eerdmans. pp. 180–199. ISBN 9780802824714. OCLC 213452269.
- ——— (2009). "The Liberation of Israel in Luke–Acts: intertextual narration as countercultural practice". In ———; Alkier, Stefan; Huizenga, Leroy Andrew (eds.). Reading the Bible intertextually. Waco, Texas: Baylor University Press. pp. 101–118. ISBN 9781602581807. OCLC 213599385.
- ——— (2012). "Faithful Witness, Alpha and Omega: the identity of Jesus in the Apocalypse of John". In ———; Alkier, Stefan (eds.). Revelation and the Politics of Apocalyptic Interpretation. Waco, Texas: Baylor University Press. pp. 69–83. ISBN 9781602585614. OCLC 773273276.

=== Journal articles ===
- ——— (1999). "The Conversion of the Imagination: Scripture and Eschatology in 1 Corinthians". New Testament Studies. 45 (1): 391–412. doi:10.1017/S0028688598003919. S2CID 170337907.
- ——— (2007). "Reading the Bible with Eyes of Faith: The Practice of Theological Exegesis". Journal of Theological Interpretation. 1 (1): 5–21. doi:10.2307/26421375. JSTOR 26421375.

Academic offices
Preceded by Neil MacGregor	Hulsean Lecturer; 2013–2014	Succeeded by The Lord Williams of Oystermouth
