= Qubain family =

Jordanian family

The Qubain family (also known as: Qubein, Cobain, Cobein, Kubein, Kubain, Al Qbain, Kobain and Kobein. Arabic: قبعين / ألقبعين ) are a wealthy Christian family of Jordanian descent. The family owns businesses and establishments throughout the region and is involved in the furniture, financial, medical and engineering service industries.
