= Jacob C. Martinson Jr. =

American university president

Jacob C. Martinson was the president of High Point University from 1985 to 2005. He graduated from the Duke Divinity School in 1957. Martinson is an ordained United Methodist minister and has served as President of Andrew College in Georgia and Brevard College in North Carolina before assuming the presidency of High Point College in North Carolina, which under his presidency achieved university status. In 1994, Westminster College, Oxford, England, honored Martinson as Honorary Fellow, the first American so honored by Westminster. Martinson is currently a consultant with Lighthouse Strategies.
