= Ellen F. Davis =

American theologian and Old Testament scholar

Ellen F. Davis (born November 20, 1950) is an American theologian and Old Testament scholar. She is the Amos Ragan Kearns Distinguished Professor of Bible and Practical Theology at Duke Divinity School.

== Biography ==
Davis has degrees from University of California, Berkeley (A.B., Comparative Literature), the Church Divinity School of the Pacific (M.Div.) and Yale University (Ph.D., Old Testament). She previously taught at Union Theological Seminary (New York City), Yale Divinity School, and Virginia Theological Seminary.

Davis's work has focused on how biblical interpretation can be used to address urgent contemporary issues in the church and world. She has considered how the Old Testament can be used to address preaching, interfaith dialogue, and the ecological crisis. Davis is known in particular for this latter work; she has written a book on the Old Testament view of land and ecology entitled Scripture, Culture, and Agriculture: An Agrarian Reading of the Bible. She appeared on NPR's program On Being with Wendell Berry in 2011 and also spoke with Berry and fellow Duke Divinity School professor Norman Wirzba at a Food and Faith conference in Nashville in 2014. Davis also works with the Great Lakes Initiative, an ecumenical gathering of East African leaders in reconciliation ministries, sponsored through Duke Divinity School's Center for Reconciliation. For several years, she has consulted with the Anglican Church in Sudan and South Sudan on theological education, community health, and sustainable agriculture.

== Bibliography ==
- Getting Involved with God: Rediscovering the Old Testament (Cowley Publications, 2001) – ISBN 1561011975
- Wondrous Depth: Preaching the Old Testament (Wesminster John Knox Press, 2005) - ISBN 9780664228590
- Scripture, Culture, and Agriculture: An Agrarian Reading Of The Bible (Cambridge University Press, 2008) – ISBN 0521732239
- Opening Israel's Scriptures (Oxford University Press, 2019) – ISBN 0190948949
